= Davor Borno =

Croatian musician

Davor Borno is a Croatian musician, pop singer and songwriter.

== Biography and career ==
Davor Borno started his musical career in 1989, on the last album of Croatian pop-rock band ITD Band and became known in the former state Yugoslavia, as a talented new musician and singer. Before that, in 1988, he was the vocalist in Boris Novković’s band Noćna Straža. 1992 to 2012 he successfully participated at the 14 music festivals in Croatia and Slovenia and won many awards at several festivals. In 1993 Borno won the prize for The Best Young Musician at traditional Split Festival.

In 1993 Borno participated in the national preselection Dora 93 for Eurosong and missed out on the chance to represent independent Croatia at the Eurovision Song Contest 1993 with the song "Ispod zvjezdica". His second album was Ljubav ili grijeh, published in 1996 for Croatia Records music company.

Throughout the years of his career, Borno had a lot of concerts in the clubs of Croatian emigrants in Europe and several Yugoslav tours. He also had a big tour with 60 concerts in Ukraine in 1990.

Since 2000, Borno is building an career in Slovenian music market, where in the last 12 years has become known to many as, "one of the most famous Croatian musicians." Creating pop music in his native Croatian with Mediterranean style.

Since 2000 to 2005 he published 4 albums: Što imam od života, Tko sam ja, Vagabundov sin, and Pozdrav iz Dalmacije - The best of Borno 2000-2005, with 17 major hits and four videos, like a crown of musical success in international markets.

2008 in the Croatian market and abroad, Borno released his seventh album Mediterraneo, colored with Dalmatian, Italian and Greek sound, melodies and rhythms, which are grown in music tradition in region of the all former Yugoslav republics. Album Mediterraneo is the result of a successful international musical collaboration, guided by the idea of creating a Mediterranean music on the grounds of tradition with modern arrangements and production.

Croatian promotion of the album Mediterraneo, started with participation at popular Croatian Radio Festival 2008 with the song "Ljudi". In Slovenian market, Mediterraneo was at the very top of the charts, and according to official data from the national RTV Slovenia, it was the best selling Croatian album in Slovenian worldwide chart of the best-selling albums 'Top 30 Slo'.

2009 Borno won the audience award of Slovenian Radio and Television "NET TV", for the best performer in 2008. It was absolute victory in all three award categories. In late 2009 he won Audience & Radio Award in the international Festival "MEF 2009." for his original song "Moj je život samo bol".

2010 released a double album The Diamond Collection 1990-2010 with 40 most successful songs in his 20 years long career. Some of songs he perform in duets with Slovenian stars. 2010 Borno also released live concert DVD Greetings from Dalmatia with 28 songs and Slovenian special guest star Helena Blagne.

Until 2012 Davor Borno's songs were released on 73 albums in several countries. (Author albums and compilations on gramophone records, cassettes, CDs and DVDs)

Borno occasionally composes for other artists. The most interesting is a collaboration with the Slovenian entertainment icon Helena Blagne, with whom recorded a duet in Slovene in 2001. He wrote the song for Helena "Ti nisi vreden mojih solz" in 2003, and he was a special guest on her five tours in Slovenia.

== Discography ==
- 1990 Album S ove strane ljubavi (ITD BAND) - silver album
- 1996 Album Ljubav ili grijeh - silver album
- 2002 Album Što imam od zivota - diamond album
- 2003 Album Tko sam ja - diamond album
- 2004 Album Vagabundov sin - platinum album
- 2005 Album Pozdrav iz Dalmacije - (The best of 2000. - 2005.) - platinum album
- 2008 Album Mediterraneo - gold album
- 2010 Album Borno - The diamond collection 1990 - 2010 (double album)
- 2010 DVD Pozdrav iz Dalmacije - live concert

== Festivals ==
- 1992 Zagrebfest 92- song "Nek mi tužne pjesme sviraju"
- 1993 Dora 93 for Eurosong – song "Ispod zvjezdica"
- 1993 Split Festival 93 – song "Vjeruj da ljubav ne umire"
- 1993 Zagrebfest 93 - song "Prolazi duga godina"
- 1994 Zagrebfest 94 - song "Samo ti"
- 1995 Cro top fest 95 - song "Jače"
- 1996 Osfest 96 - song "Jesam li za tebe bio ja"
- 1997 Osfest 97 - song "Kad propadne sve"
- 1999 Melodije hrvatskog Jadrana 99 - song "Da imam dva života ja"
- 2001 Croatian Radio Festival HRF 2001- song "Dajte mi vino"
- 2004 Melodije morja in sonca - Portorož 2008 – international show - song "Vagabundov sin"
- 2008 Croatian Radio Festival HRF 2008– song "Ljudi"
- 2009 Internacional festival MEF 2009 – song "Moj je život samo bol"
- 2010 Internacional festival MEF 2010 – song "Ruku na srce"
