= Belgium in the Eurovision Song Contest 1993 =

- Eurovision Song Contest 1993
- Participating broadcaster: Belgische Radio- en Televisieomroep Nederlandstalige Uitzendingen (BRTN)
- Country: Belgium
- Selection process: Eurosong '93
- Selection date: 6 March 1993

Competing entry
- Song: "Iemand als jij"
- Artist: Barbara Dex
- Songwriters: Marc Vliegen; Marc Dex

Placement
- Final result: 25th, 3 points

Participation chronology

Belgium was represented at the Eurovision Song Contest 1993 with the song "Iemand als jij", composed by Marc Vliegen, with lyrics by Marc Dex, and performed by Barbara Dex. The Belgian participating broadcaster, Flemish Belgische Radio- en Televisieomroep Nederlandstalige Uitzendingen (BRTN), selected its entry through the national final Eurosong '93.

== Before Eurovision ==
=== Eurosong '93 ===
Flemish broadcaster Belgische Radio- en Televisieomroep Nederlandstalige Uitzendingen (BRTN) had the turn to participate in the Eurovision Song Contest 1993 representing Belgium. BRTN held a national final to select the entry for the contest, consisting of four semi-finals leading up to a grand final on 6 March 1993. The shows were held in the Knokke Casino, hosted by Alexandra Potvin and Hans Otten.

==== Competing entries ====
Until 1 October 1992, artists were able to apply to participate in Eurosong '93. An internal jury at BRTN then selected forty artists out of 116 applications. The forty artists then had two months to supply a song for the national final.

Artist	Song	Songwriter(s)
Barbara Dex	"Iemand als jij"	Marc Vliegen, Marc Dex
Bart Herman	"Ik ga dood aan jou"	Vito Lucente, Erick Imhauser, Johan Boonen, Bart Herman
Bart Marcoen	"Vliegen op eigen vleugels"	Ignace Baert
Bert Decorte	"Afrika"	Bert Decorte
Christoff	"Zend een SOS"	Serge Feys, Christoff Wybouw
Dominique	"Een klein gebaar"	Luc Vervecken, Marc Dex
Erik Alens	"Laat ons dansen"	Erik Alens, Stef Ryckmans, Henk De Nutte
Freddie Bierset	"Europa mijn land"	Freddie Bierset
Gene Summer	"In jouw handen"	Bert Candries, Johan Verminnen
Glow	"Loop me niet voorbij"	Mark Van Puyenbroeck, Piet Van den Heuvel, Johan Hoogewijs
Go Nutz	"Samen"	Luc Nowé, Luc Van Ham
Hugo Dellas	"Harlekijn"	Patrick Mortier, Alain Van Zeveren, Mary Boduin
Illusion	"Vannacht"	S. Lefubre, R. Meire
Ingrid Verhulst	"Voel je goed"	P. Nachtergaele, Chr. Vandecauter
Johan Lotigiers	"Die mooie uren"	Johan Lotigiers, Helmut Lotigiers, Alain Van Zeveren
John Palmer	"Waterman"	André Van Der Veken, K. Saey
John Terra	"Heel gewoon"	John Terra, Jan Theys
Karin Recour	"Stad van blauwe wolken"	Yvan Guilini, Linda Bal
Kim	"Voor jou alleen"	Joannes Torbeyn
Leopold 3	"Vergeet-mij-nietje"	Erik Goossens, Patrick Claesen, Olivier Adams
Lily West	"Verliefd, in love"	Marc Vliegen, André Janssens
Lisa del Bo	"Vlinder"	Emile Elsen, Marius Degeest
Liz Larssen	"Even vrij zijn"	Roland Serpierre, Linda Beckers
Marleen	"Morgen weer gewoon"	Werner Bellon, Mary Boduin
Mieke	"Waarom zou er vrede zijn"	Gyuri Spies, Marc De Coen
Nadia	"Vrij"	Paul Vermeulen, Marie-José Quinet
Patrick Onzia	"Lena"	R. Sigo, Raymond Felix
Paul Anderson	"Als je gaat"	Paul Van Opdenbosch, Fred Beekmans
Petra	"Ga door	Adriaan Larson, Fred Beekmans, Petra de Steur
Pol and Misj	"Whisky en tranen"	Paul Gijselings, Michel Vandermaesen
Ricky Fleming	"Helemaal"	Lou Roman, Paul Vermeulen, Paul Geluyken
Robin Nills	"Ballerina"	Michel Verlooven, Roland Verlooven
Roestvrij	"Noem het maar geluk"	Patrick Mortier, Johan Verminnen
Samantha Gilles	"Vlieg met me mee"	Foco, Dieter Troubleyn
Sha-Na	"Liefde"	Raymond Felix
Stampen and Dagen	"Ik wil jou"	Rudy Van Den Nest, Rudy De Koker
Toast	"Samen zijn we sterk"	Danny Van Passel, Eddy Van Passel
Vera Wezenbeek	"Jij"	Paul Vermeulen, Lief Wuts
Wendy van Wanten	"Zonder verklaring"	Luigi Bongiovanni, Pino Marchese, Christill
Wim Ravell	"Alles doen"	Raymond Felix, Jaak Verburgt, Wim Ravell

==== Semi-finals ====
Four semi-finals were held in February 1993 to select the 12 finalists for the Belgian final. 10 songs competed in each semi-final, with the top 3 songs, selected by a 7-member jury, progressing to the final. The jury consisted of six permanent members, and one past Flemish Eurovision Song Contest representative. The six permanent jury members were: Rita Deneve, Ro Burms (replaced by Johan Vestreken in the third and fourth semi-final), Fred Bouwers, Marc Coenegracht, Mark Vlaeminck, and Andre Vermeulen. The four past Eurovision artist juries, in order of the semi-final they voted in, were: Micha Marah, Dett Peyskens of Pas de Deux, Liliane Saint-Pierre, and Ingeborg.

Each semi-final was broadcast at 20:30 (CET) on TV1.

Semi-final 1 – 6 February 1993
R/O	Artist	Song	Points	Place
1	Robin Nills	"Ballerina"	52	2
2	Kim	"Voor jou alleen"	47	4
3	Paul Anderson	"Als je gaat"	34	10
4	Glow	"Loop me niet voorbij"	44	5
5	Marleen	"Morgen weer gewoon"	41	6
6	Freddie Bierset	"Europa mijn land"	37	8
7	Lisa del Bo	"Vlinder"	53	1
8	Bert Decorte	"Afrika"	49	3
9	Liz Larssen	"Even vrij zijn"	37	8
10	Go Nutz	"Samen"	39	7

Semi-final 2 – 13 February 1993
R/O	Artist	Song	Points	Place
1	Petra	"Ga door"	56	1
2	Bart Marcoen	"Vliegen op eigen vleugels"	38	7
3	Hugo Dellas	"Harlekijn"	37	8
4	Lily West	"Verliefd, in love"	35	9
5	Pol and Misj	"Whisky en tranen"	41	5
6	Christoff	"Zend een SOS"	43	4
7	Mieke	"Waarom zou er vrede zijn"	52	2
8	John Terra	"Heel gewoon"	39	6
9	Nadia	"Vrij"	45	3
10	Toast	"Samen zijn we sterk"	32	10

Semi-final 3 – 20 February 1993
R/O	Artist	Song	Points	Place
1	Vera Wezenbeek	"Jij"	44	5
2	Leopold 3	"Vergeet-mij-nietje"	60	1
3	Karin Recour	"Stad van blauwe wolken"	32	9
4	Erik Alens	"Laat ons dansen"	37	8
5	Wendy van Wanten	"Zonder verklaring"	55	3
6	Bart Herman	"Ik ga dood aan jou"	59	2
7	Gene Summer	"In jouw handen"	42	6
8	Dominique	"Een klein gebaar"	38	7
9	Ingrid Verhulst	"Voel je goed"	30	10
10	Stampen and Dagen	"Ik wil jou"	45	4

Semi-final 4 – 27 February 1993
R/O	Artist	Song	Points	Place
1	Roestvrij	"Noem het maar geluk"	52	2
2	Ricky Fleming	"Helemaal"	40	8
3	Wim Ravell	"Alles doen"	52	2
4	Johan Lotigiers	"Die mooie uren"	39	9
5	Sha-Na	"Liefde"	45	6
6	John Palmer	"Waterman"	30	10
7	Samantha Gilles	"Vlieg met me mee"	45	6
8	Patrick Onzia	"Lena"	47	4
9	Barbara Dex	"Iemand als jij"	54	1
10	Illusion	"Vannacht"	46	5

==== Final ====
The final of the contest was held on 6 March 1993, where the winner of the Contest was selected from the 12 semi-final qualifiers by six juries: five regional juries and one professional jury. The regional juries consisted of forty television viewers. The professional jury consisted of the six permanent jury members from the semi-finals as well as Johnny Logan as a non-voting chairman of the jury. The final winner was Barbara Dex with "Iemand als jij".

The final was broadcast at 20:30 (CET) on TV1.

Final – 6 March 1993
R/O	Artist	Song	Points	Place
1	Nadia	"Vrij"	51	2
2	Wendy van Wanten	"Zonder verklaring"	12	9
3	Roestvrij	"Noem het maar geluk"	40	5
4	Leopold 3	"Vergeet-mij-nietje"	41	4
5	Petra	"Ga door"	7	10
6	Lisa del Bo	"Vlinder"	42	3
7	Robin Nills	"Ballerina"	2	12
8	Bart Herman	"Ik ga dood aan jou"	35	6
9	Wim Ravell	"Alles doen"	26	8
10	Barbara Dex	"Iemand als jij"	58	1
11	Bert Decorte	"Afrika"	4	11
12	Mieke	"Waarom zou er vrede zijn"	30	7

Detailed jury votes
R/O	Song	Regional Juries					Professional Jury	Total
R/O	Song	Antwerp	Brabant	Limburg	East Flanders	West Flanders	Professional Jury	Total
1	"Vrij"	7	8	7	12	10	7	51
2	"Zonder verklaring"	2	2	3	1	2	2	12
3	"Noem het maar geluk"	8	12	2	7	5	6	40
4	"Vergeet-mij-nietje"	5	7	5	6	8	10	41
5	"Ga door"	1		1	2		3	7
6	"Vlinder"	6	6	8	5	12	5	42
7	"Ballerina"		1			1		2
8	"Ik ga dood aan jou"	3	3	6	4	7	12	35
9	"Alles doen"	4	4	10	3	4	1	26
10	"Iemand als jij"	12	10	12	10	6	8	58
11	"Afrika"						4	4
12	"Waarom zou er vrede zijn"	10	5	4	8	3		30

== At Eurovision ==
On the night of the final Dex performed 7th in the running order, following Greece and preceding Malta. Her performance became infamous due to her see-through dress, which she made herself. At the close of the voting "Iemand als jij" had received 3 points, placing Belgium 25th and last, relegating the country from taking part in the 1994 contest.

The contest was broadcast on TV1, with commentary by André Vermeulen, and on RTBF1 and Télé 21, with commentary by Claude Delacroix.

=== Voting ===
Points awarded to Belgium
Score	Country
12 points	
10 points	
8 points	
7 points	
6 points	
5 points	
4 points	
3 points	Germany
2 points	
1 point	

Points awarded by Belgium
Score	Country
12 points	United Kingdom
10 points	Sweden
8 points	Switzerland
7 points	Netherlands
6 points	Norway
5 points	Spain
4 points	Croatia
3 points	Austria
2 points	Ireland
1 point	Bosnia and Herzegovina
