= Netherlands in the Eurovision Song Contest 1993 =

- Eurovision Song Contest 1993
- Participating broadcaster: Nederlandse Omroep Stichting (NOS)
- Country: Netherlands
- Selection process: Artist: Internal selection Song: Nationaal Songfestival 1993
- Selection date: Artist: 15 July 1992; Song: 26 March 1993

Competing entry
- Song: "Vrede"
- Artist: Ruth Jacott
- Songwriters: Eric van Tijn; Jochem Fluitsma; Henk Westbroek

Placement
- Final result: 6th, 92 points

Participation chronology

The Netherlands was represented at the Eurovision Song Contest 1993 with the song "Vrede", composed by Eric van Tijn and Jochem Fluitsma, with lyrics by Henk Westbroek, and performed by Ruth Jacott. The Dutch participating broadcaster, Nederlandse Omroep Stichting (NOS), selected its entry for the contest through a national final, after having previously selected the performer internally.

NOS announced Jacott's appointment as its representative on 15 July 1992, while it organised the national final Nationaal Songfestival 1993 in order to select the song. Eight songs competed in the national final on 26 March 1993 where "Vrede" was selected as the winning song following the votes from twelve regional juries.

The Netherlands competed in the Eurovision Song Contest which took place on 15 May 1993. Performing during the show in position 20, the Netherlands placed sixth out of the 25 participating countries, scoring 92 points.

== Background ==
Prior to the 1993 contest, Nederlandse Televisie Stichting (NTS) until 1969, and Nederlandse Omroep Stichting (NOS) since 1970, had participated in the Eurovision Song Contest representing the Netherlands thirty-five times since NTS début in the inaugural contest in 1956. They have won the contest four times: in 1957 with the song "Net als toen" performed by Corry Brokken; in 1959 with the song "'n Beetje" performed by Teddy Scholten; in 1969 as one of four countries to tie for first place with "De troubadour" performed by Lenny Kuhr; and finally in 1975 with "Ding-a-dong" performed by the group Teach-In. The Dutch least successful result has been last place, which they have achieved on four occasions, most recently in the 1968 contest. The Netherlands has also received nul points on two occasions; in 1962 and 1963.

As part of its duties as participating broadcaster, NOS organises the selection of its entry in the Eurovision Song Contest and broadcasts the event in the country. The Dutch broadcasters had used various methods to select their entries in the past, such as the Nationaal Songfestival, a live televised national final to choose the performer, song or both to compete at Eurovision. However, internal selections have also been held on occasion. For 1993, NOS opted to select the Dutch artist through an internal selection, while Nationaal Songfestival 1993 was organised to select the song; between 1989 and 1992, Nationaal Songfestival was held in order to select both the artist and song for the contest.

== Before Eurovision ==
=== Artist selection ===
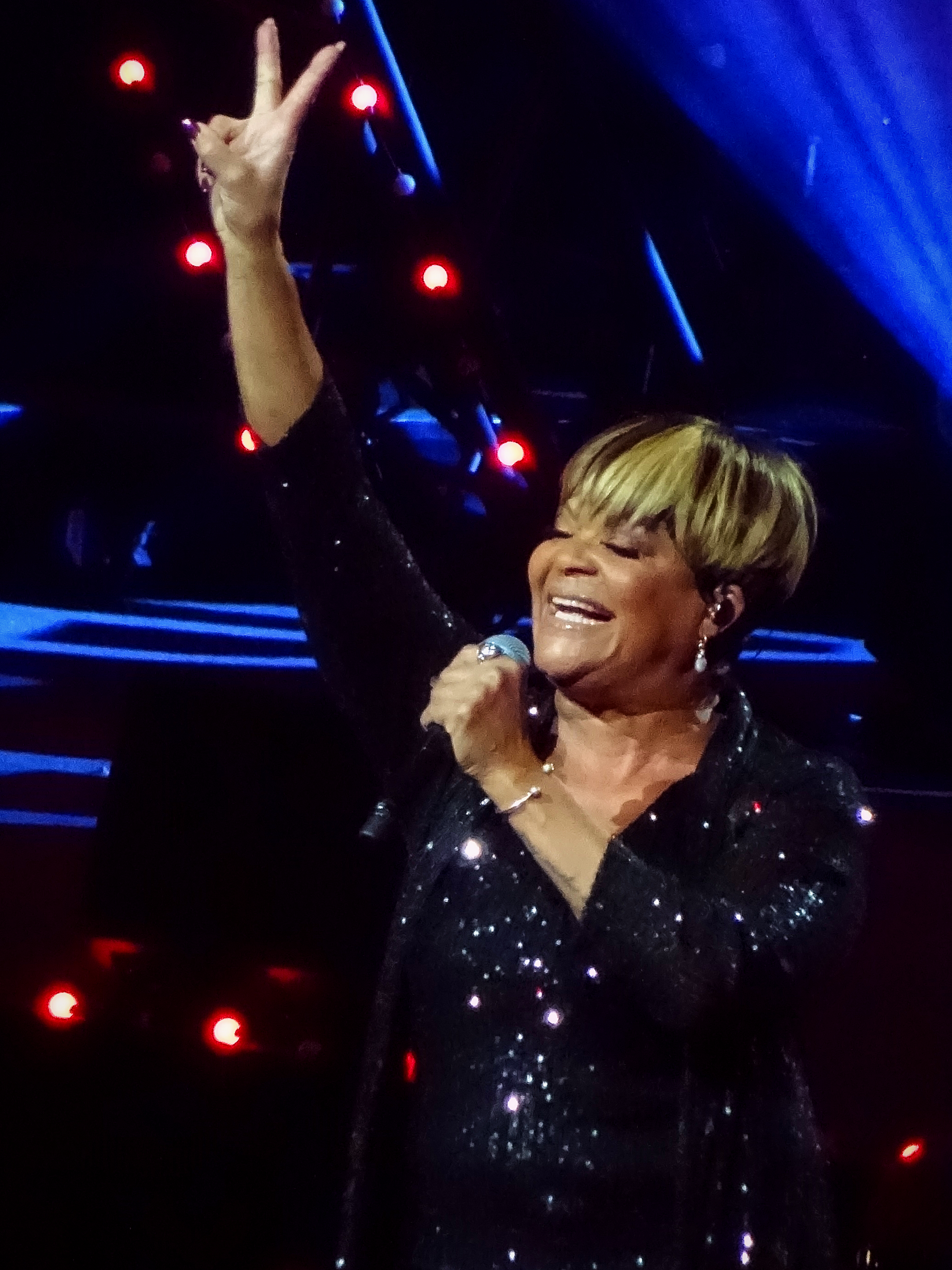
Ruth Jacott (pictured in 2019) was internally selected to represent the Netherlands in 1993

Following Humphrey Campbell's ninth place in 1992 with the song "Wijs me de weg", the Dutch broadcaster in collaboration with the Conamus music organisation internally selected the artist for the Eurovision Song Contest 1993. On 15 July 1992, NOS announced that they had selected singer Ruth Jacott to represent the Netherlands at the 1993 contest. It was revealed on the same day that her Eurovision song would be selected through the national final Nationaal Songfestival 1993.

=== Nationaal Songfestival 1993 ===
NOS opened a submission period where composers were able to submit their songs. 797 songs were received by the broadcaster at the closing of the deadline and the eight selected competing songs were announced on 5 January 1993. The selection of the songs for the competition occurred through the decision of a six-member selection commission consisting of Ruth Jacott as well as NOS and Conamus representatives from 18 shortlisted.

NOS held the national final on 26 March 1993 at the Discothèque Escape in Amsterdam, hosted by Paul de Leeuw and was broadcast on Nederland 3. Pre-recorded clips of Jacott performing all eight competing songs at the Rembrandtplein in Amsterdam were presented during the show, accompanied by the Metropole Orchestra conducted by Harry van Hoof, and the winning song, "Vrede", was selected by the votes of 12 regional juries (for reasons which are unclear, on the night the votes were announced in multiples of 1,000 - i.e. the favourite song was awarded 10,000 points). Each jury consisted of eight members: six music professionals and two television viewers selected by Intomart. In addition to the performances of the competing entries, the show featured a guest performance by Madeline Bell.

Final – 26 March 1993
| R/O | Song | Songwriter(s) | Points | Place |
|---|---|---|---|---|
| 1 | "Medeleven" | Alan Michael, Gerrit den Braber | 63 | 4 |
| 2 | "Kom op" | Franky Douglas, Mildred Douglas | 49 | 7 |
| 3 | "Ik hou van jou" | Jan Kisjes | 22 | 8 |
| 4 | "Waar blijft de tijd" | Ernst van der Kerkhof | 71 | 3 |
| 5 | "Blijf bij mij" | Ton op 't Hof, Lisa Boray, Guus Westdorp | 54 | 5 |
| 6 | "Vrede" | Eric van Tijn, Jochem Fluitsma, Henk Westbroek | 83 | 1 |
| 7 | "Tederheid" | Gina de Wit | 50 | 6 |
| 8 | "Loop met me mee" | Edwin Schimscheimer | 76 | 2 |

Detailed Regional Jury Votes
| R/O | Song | Flevoland | North Holland | South Holland | Zeeland | North Brabant | Limburg | Groningen | Friesland | Drenthe | Overijssel | Gelderland | Utrecht | Total |
|---|---|---|---|---|---|---|---|---|---|---|---|---|---|---|
| 1 | "Medeleven" | 3 | 8 | 5 | 3 | 4 | 5 | 5 | 4 | 2 | 6 | 10 | 8 | 63 |
| 2 | "Kom op" | 1 | 3 | 3 | 6 | 8 | 6 | 3 | 6 | 4 | 4 | 2 | 3 | 49 |
| 3 | "Ik hou van jou" | 2 | 2 | 2 | 2 | 3 | 3 | 1 | 2 | 1 | 2 | 1 | 1 | 22 |
| 4 | "Waar blijft de tijd" | 6 | 1 | 8 | 10 | 10 | 2 | 8 | 10 | 8 | 1 | 3 | 4 | 71 |
| 5 | "Blijf bij mij" | 5 | 10 | 1 | 5 | 5 | 4 | 2 | 3 | 6 | 3 | 5 | 5 | 54 |
| 6 | "Vrede" | 8 | 6 | 6 | 8 | 2 | 1 | 10 | 8 | 10 | 10 | 4 | 10 | 83 |
| 7 | "Tederheid" | 4 | 5 | 4 | 1 | 1 | 10 | 4 | 1 | 3 | 5 | 6 | 6 | 50 |
| 8 | "Loop met me mee" | 10 | 4 | 10 | 4 | 6 | 8 | 6 | 5 | 5 | 8 | 8 | 2 | 76 |

== At Eurovision ==
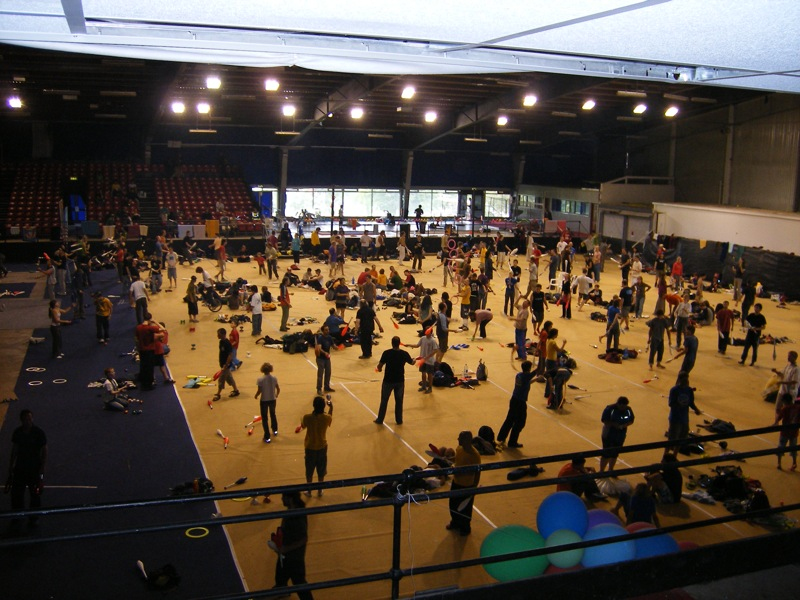
The Eurovision Song Contest 1993 took place at the Green Glens Arena in Millstreet, Ireland, on 15 May 1993.

The Eurovision Song Contest 1993 took place at the Green Glens Arena in Millstreet, Ireland, on 15 May 1993. According to the Eurovision rules, the 25-country participant list for the contest was composed of: the 22 participating countries in the 1992 contest including the host country and previous year's winner, and the top three countries of the qualifying round. In December 1992, an allocation draw was held which determined the running order and the Netherlands was set to perform in position 13, following the entry from the United Kingdom and before the entry from Croatia. The Dutch conductor at the contest was Harry van Hoof, and the Netherlands finished in sixth place with 92 points. The contest was broadcast in the Netherlands on Nederland 3 with commentary by Willem van Beusekom.

=== Voting ===
Below is a breakdown of points awarded to the Netherlands and awarded by the Netherlands in the contest. The nation awarded its 12 points to Portugal in the contest.

Points awarded to Netherlands
| Score | Country |
|---|---|
| 12 points | Ireland |
| 10 points | Bosnia and Herzegovina; Norway |
| 8 points | |
| 7 points | Belgium; Germany; Slovenia; Spain |
| 6 points | Iceland; Italy; Turkey |
| 5 points | Sweden |
| 4 points | |
| 3 points | Austria; Croatia; Malta |
| 2 points | |
| 1 point | |

Points awarded by the Netherlands
| Score | Country |
|---|---|
| 12 points | Portugal |
| 10 points | Ireland |
| 8 points | Switzerland |
| 7 points | Iceland |
| 6 points | Norway |
| 5 points | Greece |
| 4 points | United Kingdom |
| 3 points | France |
| 2 points | Italy |
| 1 point | Germany |
