= Sweden in the Eurovision Song Contest 1993 =

- Eurovision Song Contest 1993
- Participating broadcaster: Sveriges Television (SVT)
- Country: Sweden
- Selection process: Melodifestivalen 1993
- Selection date: 5 March 1993

Competing entry
- Song: "Eloise"
- Artist: Arvingarna
- Songwriters: Lasse Holm; Gert Lengstrand

Placement
- Final result: 7th, 89 points

Participation chronology

Sweden was represented at the Eurovision Song Contest 1993 with the song "Eloise", composed by Lasse Holm, with lyrics by Gert Lengstrand, and performed by the dansband Arvingarna. The Swedish participating broadcaster, Sveriges Television (SVT), selected its entry through Melodifestivalen 1993.

At Eurovision, Sweden performed 13th, following France and preceding Ireland. As the close of the voting, they had finished 7th in a field of 25 with 89 points.

== Before Eurovision ==
=== Melodifestivalen 1993 ===
Melodifestivalen 1993 was the selection for the 33rd song to represent Sweden at the Eurovision Song Contest. It was the 32nd time that this system of picking a song had been used. 1569 songs were submitted to Sveriges Television (SVT) for the competition. The final was held in the Lisebergshallen in Gothenburg on 5 March 1993, presented by Triple & Touch and was broadcast on TV2 and Sveriges Radio's P4 network. The show was watched by 4,284,000 people, with a total of 166,045 votes cast.

The winner was selected over two rounds of voting. After the juries had selected 5 songs for a "super final", it was revealed that the TV viewers would choose the winner by regional televoting. However, the voting became a bit repetitive, and televoting was not re-introduced until six years later when it was combined with regional juries.

The winner was the dansband Arvingarna with the song "Eloise".

First Round – 5 March 1993
R/O	Artist	Song	Songwriter(s)	Points	Place
1	N.E.O.	"Högt i det blå"	Dan Ådahl	-	-
2	Monica Silverstrand	"Vågornas sång"	Per Andréasson, Anders Dannvik	8	5
3	Lena Pålsson	"Sjunde himlen"	Stephan Berg	13	4
4	Patrick Swahn	"På vingar av kärlek"	Kjell-Åke Norén	-	-
5	Nick Borgen	"We Are All the Winners"	Nick Borgen	42	2
6	Christer Björkman	"Välkommen till livet"	Mikael Bolyos, Örjan Strandberg	-	-
7	Pernilla Emme	"I dina ögon"	Per Andréasson, Anders Dannvik	28	3
8	Richard Carlsohn	"Ge mig din hand"	Martin Klaman, Hans Skoog	-	-
9	Tina Leijonberg	"Närmare dig"	Ingela 'Pling' Forsman, Håkan Mjörnheim	-	-
10	Arvingarna	"Eloise"	Gert Lengstrand, Lasse Holm	56	1

Detailed Regional Televoting
Song	South		South East		East		Stockholm		Bergslagen		North		West		Total	
Song	Votes	Points	Votes	Points	Votes	Points	Votes	Points	Votes	Points	Votes	Points	Votes	Points	Votes	Points
"Vågornas sång"	1,740	1	1,290	1	946	2	1,503	1	518	1	1,239	1	1,647	1	8,883	8
"Sjunde himlen"	2,182	2	2,166	2	941	1	1,614	2	767	2	1,674	2	2,061	2	11,405	13
"We Are All the Winners"	11,601	6	9,093	6	5,573	6	9,065	6	3,506	6	6,963	6	11,697	6	57,498	42
"I dina ögon"	2,988	4	2,549	4	1,736	4	3,064	4	1,003	4	1,968	4	4,033	4	17,341	28
"Eloise"	12,349	8	9,716	8	6,705	8	11,695	8	4,419	8	9,101	8	16,933	8	70,918	56
Total televotes	30,860		24,814		15,901		26,941		10,213		20,945		36,371		166,045	

== At Eurovision ==
Arvingarna performed thirteenth at the 1993 Eurovision Song Contest, following France's "Mama Corsica" performed by Patrick Fiori and preceding Ireland's "In Your Eyes" performed by Niamh Kavanagh. The juries awarded "Eloise" 7th place with 89 points, thereby ensuring that Sweden had qualified for the following year's contest under the newly introduced relegation system. The Swedish jury awarded their twelve points to eventual contest-winners Ireland.

=== Voting ===
Points awarded to Sweden
Score	Country
12 points	
10 points	Austria; Belgium; Israel
8 points	Germany; Switzerland
7 points	Denmark; Finland; Iceland; United Kingdom
6 points	Slovenia
5 points	Luxembourg
4 points	Portugal
3 points	
2 points	
1 point	

Points awarded by Sweden
Score	Country
12 points	Ireland
10 points	United Kingdom
8 points	France
7 points	Iceland
6 points	Switzerland
5 points	Netherlands
4 points	Malta
3 points	Slovenia
2 points	Portugal
1 point	Denmark
