= Kvalifikacija za Millstreet =

Qualifying song contest for the Eurovision Song Contest 1993

Date and venue
- Final: 3 April 1993
- Venue: TV SLO Studio 1 Ljubljana, Slovenia

Organisation
- Organiser: European Broadcasting Union (EBU)
- Scrutineer: Frank Naef

Production
- Host broadcaster: Radiotelevizija Slovenija (RTVSLO)
- Director: Peter Juratovec
- Executive producer: Edo Brzin
- Musical director: Petar Ugrin; Mojmir Sepe
- Presenters: Tajda Lekše

Participants
- Number of entries: 7
- Participation map: Participating countries

Vote
- Voting system: One juror from each country awarded 12, 10, 8–5 points to each song
- Winning songs: Slovenia; "Tih deževen dan"; Bosnia and Herzegovina; "Sva bol svijeta"; Croatia; "Don't Ever Cry"

Kvalifikacija za Millstreet (English: Preselection for Millstreet; French: Présélection pour Millstreet) was a televised song contest held as a qualifying round for the Eurovision Song Contest 1993. Organised by the European Broadcasting Union (EBU) and host broadcaster Radiotelevizija Slovenija (RTVSLO), the contest was held on 3 April 1993 in Studio 1 of Televizija Slovenija in Ljubljana, Slovenia, and presented by the Slovenian television presenter Tajda Lekše.

The fall of communist regimes in Europe and the formation of new countries following the collapse of Czechoslovakia, the Soviet Union, and Yugoslavia, led to an increased interest in Eurovision Song Contest participation. Kvalifikacija za Millstreet was organised as a one-off event to reduce the number of countries allowed to participate in the 1993 event, with a relegation system introduced for future editions allowing new and returning countries direct access to the contest to replace the lowest-scoring countries from the previous year's event.

Entries representing seven countries, none of which had previously competed in the Eurovision Song Contest, participated in the event, with three countries being selected to progress to the Eurovision Song Contest 1993, held on 15 May in Millstreet, Ireland. One juror from each of the competing countries voted on the competing entries, with Bosnia and Herzegovina, Croatia, and Slovenia chosen to progress to the contest in Millstreet. Estonia, Hungary, Romania, and Slovakia, the countries which failed to progress through Kvalifikacija za Millstreet, subsequently made their contest debuts in 1994.

== Background ==
The Eurovision Song Contest is an internationally televised songwriting competition, organised annually by the European Broadcasting Union (EBU) between members of the union who participate representing their countries. Each participating broadcaster submits an original song to be performed by a chosen artist, and cast votes for the other countries' songs to determine a winner. Originally held in 1956 with seven competing countries, the contest quickly began to grow as more broadcasters became interested in participating, and by the early 1990s entries from over 20 countries were regularly featured in each year's event.

By 1992, an increasing number of broadcasters had begun expressing an interest in participating in the contest for the first time. This was a result of revolutions leading to the fall of communist regimes in Europe in the late 1980s and early 1990s and the formation of new countries due to the collapse of the Soviet Union and Yugoslavia. With the admission into the EBU of the broadcasters of the countries that emerged from the breakup of Yugoslavia, and the merger of the EBU with its Eastern European counterpart, the International Radio and Television Organisation (OIRT), the number of broadcasters eligible to participate in the contest increased significantly. To accommodate these new broadcasters, the EBU expanded the maximum number of participants for the 1993 contest to twenty-five, with entries from three new countries joining twenty-two of the twenty-three countries which had participated in the 1992 event. Yugoslavia was unable to participate after its EBU member broadcaster Jugoslovenska radio-televizija (JRT) was disbanded in 1992 and its successor organisations Radio-televizija Srbije (RTS) and Radio-televizija Crne Gore (RTCG) were barred from joining the union due to sanctions against the country as part of the Yugoslav Wars.

In order to determine which countries would progress to the contest proper, a preselection round was held for the first time in the contest's history, with the top three countries in this round progressing to compete in the Eurovision Song Contest 1993 held in Millstreet, Ireland. This contest, Kvalifikacija za Millstreet, took place in Ljubljana, Slovenia, and was produced by the Slovenian public broadcaster Radiotelevizija Slovenija (RTVSLO). Originally planned to be held in Portorož, the event was ultimately held in Studio 1 of Televizija Slovenija, with Edo Brzin serving as executive producer, Peter Juratovec serving as director and Jože Spacal serving as designer. Petar Ugrin and Mojmir Sepe served as joint musical directors and were responsible for leading the RTVSLO Revue Orchestra during the event; a separate musical director could be appointed by each participating broadcaster to conduct the orchestra during the performance of its entry. On behalf of the EBU, the event was overseen by Frank Naef as scrutineer.

== Participating countries ==
Initially, new EBU member broadcasters in as many as fourteen countries registered their interest in competing in the Eurovision Song Contest's first preselection event, including those in Belarus, the Czech Republic, Latvia, Lithuania, Russia, and Ukraine. By February 1993, however, the number of participants had dropped to six, comprising planned entries from Bosnia and Herzegovina, Bulgaria, Croatia, Hungary, Romania, and Slovenia. Subsequently, Bulgaria's planned entry did not materialise, however Estonia and Slovakia joined the contest, resulting in seven countries competing in total for the three spots available in Millstreet.

Participants of Kvalifikacija za Millstreet
Country	Broadcaster	Artist	Song	Language	Songwriter(s)	Conductor
Bosnia and Herzegovina	RTVBiH	Fazla	"Sva bol svijeta"	Bosnian	Dino Dervišhalidović; Fahrudin Pecikoza	Esad Arnautalić
Croatia	HRT	Put	"Don't Ever Cry"	Croatian, English	Andrej Baša; Đorđe Novković	Andrej Baša
Estonia	ETV	Janika Sillamaa	"Muretut meelt ja südametuld"	Estonian	Leelo Tungal; Andres Valkonen	Peeter Lilje
Hungary	MTV	Andrea Szulák	"Árva reggel"	Hungarian	Emese Hatvani; György Jakab; László Pásztor	Petar Ugrin
Romania	TVR	Dida Drăgan	"Nu pleca"	Romanian	Dida Drăgan; Adrian Ordean	George Natsis
Slovakia	STV	Elán	"Amnestia na neveru"	Slovak	Ján Baláž; Boris Filan; Jozef Ráž	Vladimir Valovič
Slovenia	RTVSLO	1X Band	"Tih deževen dan"	Slovene	Tomaž Kosec; Cole Moretti	Petar Ugrin

== Contest overview ==
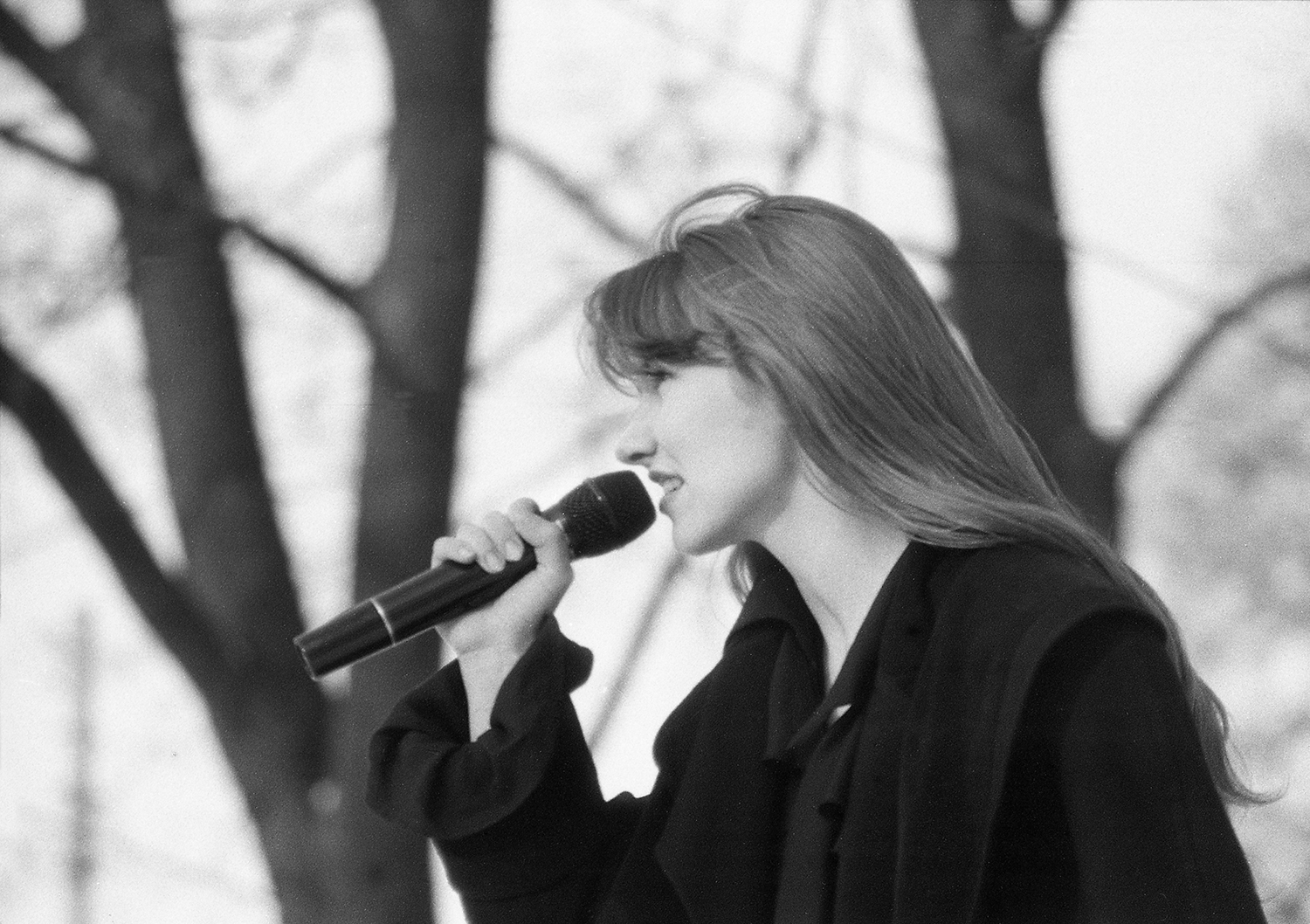
Janika Sillamaa represented Estonia in the contest.

Kvalifikacija za Millstreet took place on 3 April 1993 and was presented by Tajda Lekše.

The three entries that received the most votes and progressed to the Eurovision Song Contest 1993 were those from Slovenia, Bosnia and Herzegovina, and Croatia. As former constituent republics of the Socialist Federal Republic of Yugoslavia, all three countries had previously been represented in the Eurovision Song Contest through entries sent by Yugoslavia. Estonia, Hungary, Romania, and Slovakia, which failed to progress through Kvalifikacija za Millstreet, made their contest debuts the following year following the introduction of a relegation system which resulted in the lowest-scoring countries from the 1993 contest being replaced by new countries in 1994.

Results of Kvalifikacija za Millstreet
R/O	Country	Artist	Song	Points	Place
1	Bosnia and Herzegovina	Fazla	"Sva bol svijeta"	52	2
2	Croatia	Put	"Don't Ever Cry"	51	3
3	Estonia	Janika Sillamaa	"Muretut meelt ja südametuld"	47	5
4	Hungary	Andrea Szulák	"Árva reggel"	44	6
5	Romania	Dida Drăgan	"Nu pleca"	38	7
6	Slovenia	1X Band	"Tih deževen dan"	54	1
7	Slovakia	Elán	"Amnestia na neveru"	50	4

== Detailed voting results ==
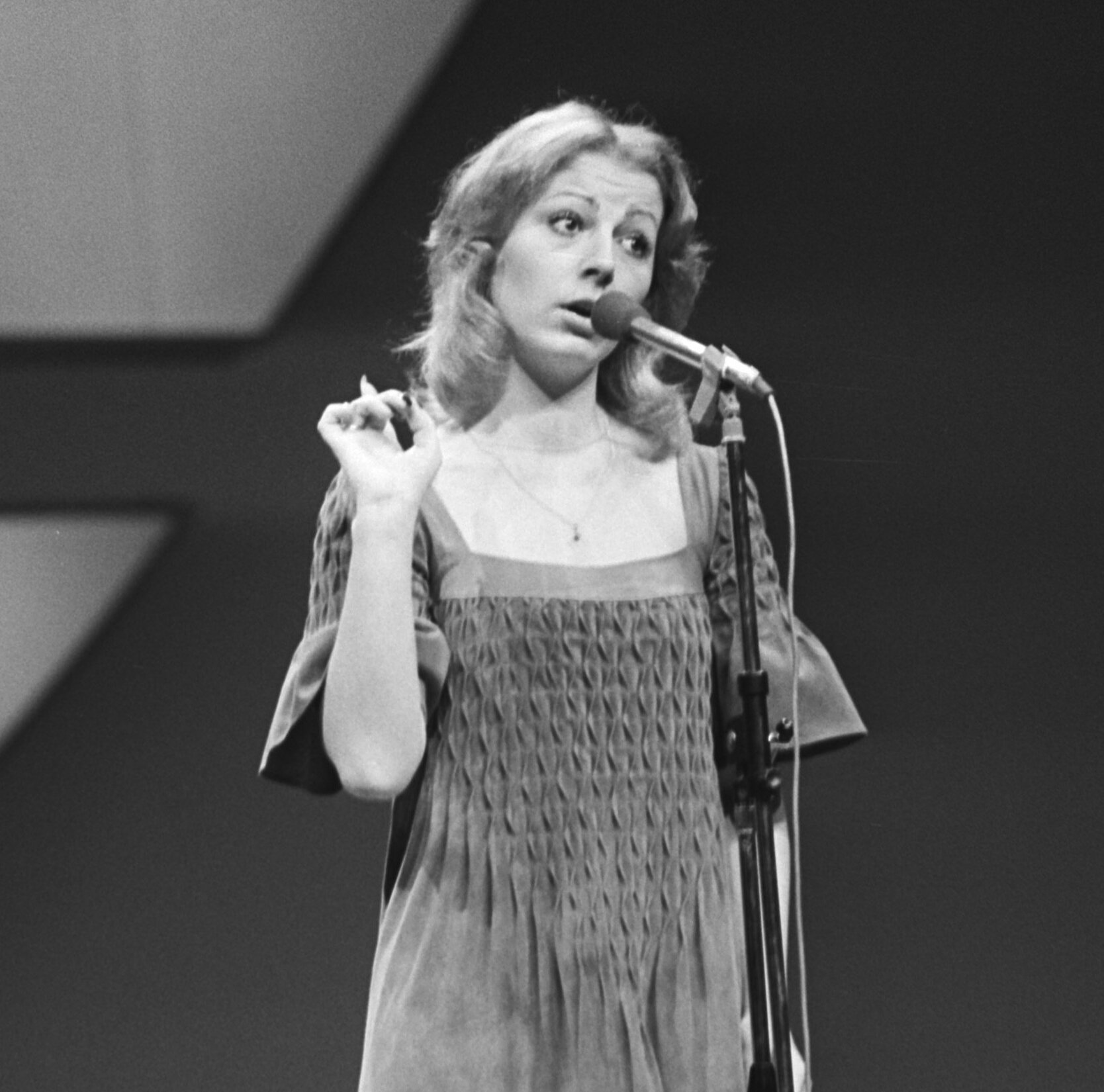
Ismeta Dervoz-Krvavac, the Bosnia and Herzegovina juror, previously represented Yugoslavia in the Eurovision Song Contest 1976 as a member of the group Ambasadori.

Jury voting was used to determine the points awarded by all countries. As telephone communications could not be relied upon to reach juries based in the competing countries, one juror appointed by each participating broadcaster was sent to Slovenia in order to provide votes for their respective country. These jurors were located in the same venue as the performers and announced their votes live and on camera during the voting segment. Each juror awarded twelve points to their favourite entry, followed by ten points to their second favourite, and then awarded points in decreasing value from eight to five for the remaining songs, excluding the entry from their own country. The respective jurors from each country and the detailed breakdown of the points awarded is listed in the tables below.

Jurors

- Bosnia and Herzegovina – Ismeta Dervoz-Krvavac
- Croatia – Ksenija Urličić
- Estonia – Jüri Makarov
- Hungary – Péter Wolf
- Romania – Aurora Andronache
- Slovenia – Mojmir Sepe
- Slovakia – Stanislav Bartovič

Detailed voting results of Kvalifikacija za Millstreet
		Total score	Bosnia and Herzegovina	Croatia	Estonia	Hungary	Romania	Slovenia	Slovakia
Contestants	Bosnia and Herzegovina	52		5	8	10	10	7	12
Contestants	Croatia	51	10		6	12	7	8	8
Contestants	Estonia	47	6	8		8	6	12	7
Contestants	Hungary	44	7	6	12		8	6	5
Contestants	Romania	38	5	12	5	5		5	6
Contestants	Slovenia	54	8	7	10	7	12		10
Contestants	Slovakia	50	12	10	7	6	5	10	

== Broadcasts ==
The contest was broadcast via the EBU's Eurovision network, with EBU member broadcasters able to relay the contest via their channels. Broadcasters were able to send commentators to provide coverage of the contest in their own native language and to relay information about the artists and songs to their television viewers. Broadcasters in all competing countries, as well as broadcasters in Cyprus, Denmark, Greece, Portugal, and Spain, relayed the event either live or delayed. Known details on the broadcasts in each country, including the specific broadcasting stations and commentators are shown in the tables below.

Broadcasters and commentators in participating countries
Country	Broadcaster	Channel	Commentator(s)	Ref(s)
Bosnia and Herzegovina	RTVBiH			
Croatia	HRT	HRT 1	Aleksandar Kostadinov	
Estonia	ETV		Olavi Pihlamägi	
Hungary	MTV	MTV1	István Vágó	
Romania	TVR	TVR 1		
Slovakia	STV	STV2		
Slovenia	RTVSLO	SLO 1	Gregor Krajc	
Slovenia	RTVSLO	Val 202		

Broadcasters and commentators in non-participating countries
Country	Broadcaster	Channel	Commentator(s)	Ref(s)
Denmark	DR	DR TV (Note: Delayed broadcast on 8 May 1993 at 22:41 (CEST))		

== Notes and references ==
=== Bibliography ===
- O'Connor, John Kennedy (2010). The Eurovision Song Contest: The Official History (2nd ed.). London, United Kingdom: Carlton Books. ISBN 978-1-84732-521-1.
- Roxburgh, Gordon (2020). Songs for Europe: The United Kingdom at the Eurovision Song Contest. Vol. Four: The 1990s. Prestatyn, United Kingdom: Telos Publishing. ISBN 978-1-84583-163-9.
