= Anita Notaro =

TV producer, director, journalist and writer

- Born: 14 September 1955; Dublin, Ireland
- Died: 26 November 2014 (aged 59); Dublin, Ireland

Anita Notaro (14 September 1955 – 26 November 2014), was a TV producer and director that worked for RTÉ for sixteen years. She directed the Eurovision Song Contest 1993 held in the Irish town of Millstreet and became the second female director for the contest after Yvonne Littlewood, BBC Television producer and director that organized the Eurovision Song Contest 1963 at London's Television Centre. She was also a journalist and the writer of Back After the Break, Behind the Scenes and The WWW Club.

== Biography ==
Anita Notaro was born on 14 September 1955, in Dublin, Ireland to an Irish mother and an Irish/Italian father. She had three younger sisters. Notaro became a journalist and got a job by winning an open competition for programming assistants in 1983. She worked for RTÉ where she went on to be a TV producer and director. In 1997, she directed a Rory Gallagher concert recorded at the Cork Opera House. She was also responsible for directing The Eurovision Song Contest and the Irish General Election before she took redundancy to try out her writing career. Notaro returned from time to time to direct several episodes of the Irish soap, Fair city. Notaro also worked for the BBC and Channel 4. She continued writing despite a cancer diagnosis in 2005. In 2008 Notaro won the Popular Fiction Book of the Year. However, in 2011 Notaro was given a diagnosis of front-temporal dementia. Notaro was married to Gerry McGuinness from 2004 and although they moved to their dream home in Brittas they mostly lived in Dublin where they returned when Notaro became unwell. She died in Dublin on 26 November 2014.

== Bibliography ==
- Back After the Break, 2003
- Behind the Scenes, 2004
- The WWW Club, 2007
- Take a Look at Me Now, 2007
- No Ordinary Love, 2010
- A Moment Like This, 2012
