= Croatia in the Eurovision Song Contest 1993 =

- Eurovision Song Contest 1993
- Participating broadcaster: Croatian Radiotelevision (HRT)
- Country: Croatia
- Selection process: Hrvatski televizijski festival 1993
- Selection date: 28 February 1993

Competing entry
- Song: "Don't Ever Cry"
- Artist: Put
- Songwriters: Andrej Baša; Đorđe Novković

Placement
- Final result: 15th, 31 points

Participation chronology

Croatia was represented at the Eurovision Song Contest 1993 with the song "Don't Ever Cry", composed by Andrej Baša, with lyrics by Đorđe Novković, and performed by the band Put. The Croatian participating broadcaster, Croatian Radiotelevision (HRT), selected its entry for the contest through Hrvatski televizijski festival 1993. This was the first-ever entry from independent Croatia in the Eurovision Song Contest.

== Background ==
Croatia first appeared in the Eurovision Song Contest as an independent country in 1993, having previously entered as a part of Yugoslavia from 1961 to 1991. The sub-national broadcaster from SR Croatia was the most successful at the national finals, with 11 of the 27 entries that won the Yugoslavian selection for Eurovision being Croatian.

During the disintegration of Yugoslavia, the state broadcaster at the time, Jugoslavenska radiotelevizija (JRT), decided to continue its participation in Eurovision, holding one –last– national final for the 1992 contest, held on 28 March 1992. Only the broadcasters from the republics of Serbia, Montenegro, and Bosnia and Herzegovina competed in the national final, despite the latter declaring independence on 1 March. The broadcasters from Croatia, Slovenia, and Macedonia did not compete after their countries declaring independence from Yugoslavia in 1991. The winning song was "Ljubim te pesmama" by Extra Nena, representing Serbia. However, by the time Extra Nena competed at Eurovision for Yugoslavia, the Socialist Federal Republic of Yugoslavia had already ceased to exist, and a new country, the Federal Republic of Yugoslavia, had been formed.

Croatia's former sub-national broadcaster RTV Zagreb became the country's national broadcaster after independence, renamed Croatian Radiotelevision (Croatian: Hrvatska radiotelevizija; HRT). HRT became a member of the EBU on 1 January 1993, allowing it to compete in the Eurovision Song Contest for the first time representing Croatia as an independent country in 1993. HRT confirmed its intentions to participate at the 1993 contest on 14 November 1992. Along with its participation confirmation, it announced that it would hold a national final to select its entry.

== Before Eurovision ==
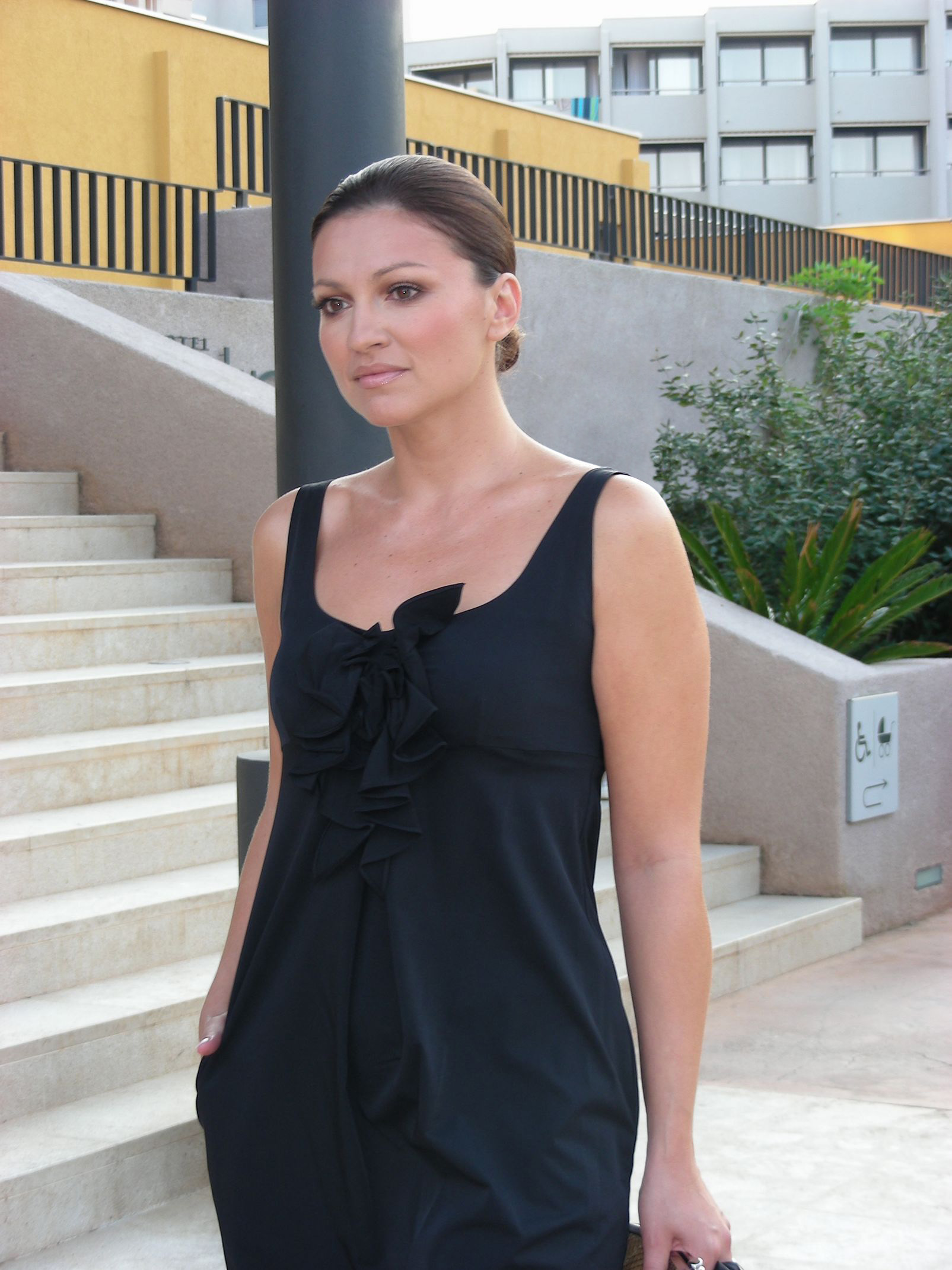
Nina Badrić (pictured in 2007) was one of the 15 participants of Hrvatski televizijski festival 1993.

=== Hrvatski televizijski festival 1993 ===
To select its entry for the Eurovision Song Contest 1993, HRT held a national final. Hrvatski televizijski festival 1993 (HTF 1993; retroactively known as Dora 1993) was held on 28 February 1993 at the Crystal Ballroom of Hotel Kvarner in Opatija, hosted by Sanja Doležal and Frano Lasić. Prior to the event, 134 songs had been submitted to the broadcaster; sixteen candidate entries were then selected by a jury panel, consisting of Milan Mitrović, Mario Bogliuni, Krešimir Oblak, Tomislav Ivčić, Aleksandar Kostadinov and Drago Britvić, from the received submissions. One song was later disqualified, and ultimately, fifteen remaining entries competed, with the winning song chosen by 11 regional jury panels. At the close of voting, "Don't Ever Cry" performed by Put received the most votes and was selected as the Croatian entry. In addition to the performances of the competing entries, Sanja Doležal, Frano Lasić, Ivo Robić, Tomislav Ivčić, Rajko Dujmić, Tereza Kesovija (who represented Monaco in 1966 and Yugoslavia in 1972), Daniel Popović (Yugoslavia in 1983), Doris Dragović (Yugoslavia in 1986 and Croatia in 1999), and Eurovision winner Riva (Yugoslavia in 1989), performed as special guests.

Final – 28 February 1993
R/O	Artist	Song	Points	Place
1	Davor Borno	"Ispod zvjezdica"	23	8
2	Nina Badrić	"Ostavljam te"	24	7
3	Alka Vuica and Sandi Cenov	"OK"	10	11
4	K-2	"Pepeljuge su same"	0	15
5	Alter Ego	"Ritam u grudima"	2	13
6	Neki to vole vruće	"Sve me podsjeća na nju"	54	3
7	Put	"Don't Ever Cry"	85	1
8	Zorica Kondža	"Nema mi do tebe"	51	4
9	Academia	"Tam Tam Ta Ram"	1	14
10	Ivo Amulić	"Odlazim"	48	5
11	Tony Cetinski	"Nek te zagrli netko sretniji"	33	6
12	Maja Blagdan	"Jedini moj"	76	2
13	Leteći odred	"Cijeli je svijet zaljubljen"	19	9
14	Dorian	"Lady"	3	12
15	Dražen Žanko	"Gordana"	11	10

Detailed Regional Jury Votes
R/O	Song	Rijeka	Zadar	Bjelovar	Vinkovci	Pazin	Split	Zagreb	Osijek	Gospić	Dubrovnik	Varaždin	Total
1	"Ispod zvjezdica"	1	3	3		7	5		3			1	23
2	"Ostavljam te"				12						12		24
3	"OK"	2				1						7	10
4	"Pepeljuge su same"												0
5	"Ritam u grudima"								2				2
6	"Sve me podsjeća na nju"	5	2	2	5		3	5	5	7	10	10	54
7	"Don't Ever Cry"	12	10	10	7	10		12	12			12	85
8	"Nema mi do tebe"		1		2	2	7	7	10	10	7	5	51
9	"Tam Tam Ta Ram"									1			1
10	"Odlazim"		12	12	1	5	12	1			5		48
11	"Nek te zagrli netko sretniji"	10		7		3	2	3	1	2	2	3	33
12	"Jedini moj"	7	7	5	10	12	10	10		12	1	2	76
13	"Cijeli je svijet zaljubljen"		5	1			1		7	5			19
14	"Lady"									3			3
15	"Gordana"	3			3			2			3		11

== At Kvalifikacija za Millstreet ==
In the early 1990s, the number of broadcasters eligible to participate in the Eurovision Song Contest increased significantly with the disintegration of Yugoslavia and the subsequent admission into the European Broadcasting Union (EBU) of the broadcasters of the countries that emerged from the breakup. The merger of the EBU with its Eastern European counterpart, the International Radio and Television Organisation (OIRT), further expanded the number of broadcasters by including those from countries of the former Eastern Bloc. The broadcasters from seven of those new countries confirmed their intentions to debut at the 1993 contest. With this large influx of participants, the EBU was forced to create a new measure to counter overcrowding in the contest. The EBU decided to hold a one-off qualification round to select the entries from three of those seven new countries, which would join the entries from the twenty-two countries already competing in the Eurovision Song Contest.

The Kvalifikacija za Millstreet (Qualification for Millstreet) contest was held in Ljubljana, Slovenia on 3 April at the television studios of Slovene broadcaster Radiotelevizija Slovenija (RTVSLO). Seven countries in total competed, including Bosnia and Herzegovina, for a place in the final on 15 May 1993. Performing during the show in position two, following Bosnia and Herzegovina and preceding Estonia, Croatia received 51 points, placing third and subsequently qualifying to the Eurovision Song Contest proper alongside Slovenia and Bosnia and Herzegovina.

=== Voting ===
Points awarded to Croatia
Score	Country
12 points	Hungary
10 points	Bosnia and Herzegovina
8 points	Slovakia; Slovenia
7 points	Romania
6 points	Estonia
5 points	

Points awarded by Croatia
Score	Country
12 points	Romania
10 points	Slovakia
8 points	Estonia
7 points	Slovenia
6 points	Hungary
5 points	Bosnia and Herzegovina

== At Eurovision ==
Put performed 21st at the Eurovision Song Contest 1993 in Millstreet, Ireland, following the Netherlands and preceding Spain. Despite being a favourite to win the contest, the group received only 31 points, placing 15th of the 25 competing countries. The Croatian jury awarded its 12 points to Norway.

=== Voting ===
Points awarded to Croatia
Score	Country
12 points	
10 points	
8 points	United Kingdom
7 points	
6 points	Israel
5 points	Portugal
4 points	Belgium; Norway
3 points	Switzerland
2 points	
1 point	Spain

Points awarded by Croatia
Score	Country
12 points	Norway
10 points	United Kingdom
8 points	France
7 points	Spain
6 points	Ireland
5 points	Iceland
4 points	Malta
3 points	Netherlands
2 points	Switzerland
1 point	Turkey
