= Switzerland in the Eurovision Song Contest 1993 =

- Eurovision Song Contest 1993
- Participating broadcaster: Swiss Broadcasting Corporation (SRG SSR)
- Country: Switzerland
- Selection process: Concours Eurovision de la Chanson
- Selection date: 6 February 1993

Competing entry
- Song: "Moi, tout simplement"
- Artist: Annie Cotton
- Songwriters: Christophe Duc; Jean-Jacques Egli

Placement
- Final result: 3rd, 148 points

Participation chronology

Switzerland was represented at the Eurovision Song Contest 1993 with the song "Moi, tout simplement", composed by Christophe Duc, with lyrics by Jean-Jacques Egli, and performed by Canadian singer Annie Cotton. The Swiss participating broadcaster, the Swiss Broadcasting Corporation (SRG SSR), selected its entry through a national final.

== Before Eurovision ==
=== Concours Eurovision de la Chanson ===
The Swiss Broadcasting Corporation (SRG SSR) held a national final to select its entry for the Eurovision Song Contest 1993. For the first time since 1984, an internal jury selected the songs for the national final, rather than the broadcaster's regional divisions using their own selection methods for the event. The broadcaster received 165 total song submissions, and initially selected eight to take part in the selection, with four in Italian, three in French, and two in German.

In January 1993, "Mondo i domani" by Duilio was disqualified due to the song being performed publicly prior to the selection. He would later represent Switzerland in 1994.

Swiss German and Romansh broadcaster Schweizer Fernsehen der deutschen und rätoromanischen Schweiz (SF DRS) staged the national final on 6 February 1993 at 20:30 (CET) at its television studios in Zürich. It was hosted by Sandra Studer, who had represented Switzerland in 1991. The national final was broadcast on SF, TSR (with commentary from Jean-Marc Richard), and TSI.

Participating entries
Broadcaster	Artist(s)	Song	Songwriter(s)		Language
Broadcaster	Artist(s)	Song	Composer	Lyricist(s)	Language
RTSI	Diaspro	"Riflesso" (Note: Temporarily titled "Ciò che non esiste")	Michele Domenici		Italian
RTSI	Mary	"Non siamo angeli"	Renato Mascetti		Italian
RTSI	~~Duilio~~	~~"Mondo i domani"~~	~~Giuseppe Scaramello~~		Italian
SF DRS	Chris Lorens	"Zwei leben in strom der zeit"	Christian Grob	Symon Dale Sanders	German
SF DRS	Jürg Stein	"Antarctica"	Corry Knobel	Corry Knobel; Jürg Stein	German
TSR	Annie Cotton	"Moi, tout simplement"	Christophe Duc	Jean-Jacques Egli	French
TSR	Natasha	"Pour toujours"	Corriya		French
TSR	Scarlet	"Donner"	Vincent Prezioso	Scarlet Chessex	French

The voting consisted of regional public votes which were sent to the three divisions of SRG SSR (SF DRS, TSR, TSI: German-Romansh, French, and Italian speaking, respectively) and an expert jury. The winner was the song "Moi, tout simplement", composed by Christophe Duc, with lyrics by Jean-Jacques Egli, and performed by Annie Cotton.

Final – 6 February 1993
R/O	Artist	Song	Regional Juries			Expert Jury	Total	Place
R/O	Artist	Song	DRS	TSR	TSI	Expert Jury	Total	Place
1	Chris Lorens	"Zwei leben im strom der zeit"	4	2	5	3	14	4
2	Annie Cotton	"Moi, tout simplement"	8	8	6	8	30	1
3	Mary	"Non siamo angeli"	1	1	2	1	5	7
4	Natasha	"Pour toujours"	2	3	1	2	8	6
5	Diaspro	"Riflesso"	5	5	8	6	24	2
6	Jürg Stein	"Antarctica"	3	4	3	4	14	4
7	Scarlet	"Donner"	6	6	4	5	21	3

== At Eurovision ==
At the Eurovision Song Contest 1993, held at the Green Glens Arena in Millstreet, the Swiss entry was the fourth entry of the night following Germany and preceding Denmark. The Swiss conductor at the contest was Marc Sorrentino. At the close of voting, Switzerland had received 148 points in total; finishing in third place out of twenty-five countries. This instance was the first time Switzerland finished in the top 3 since their victory in the 1988 contest and the highest score for Switzerland in all the Eurovision contests for years until it got beaten by three future songs: "She Got Me" by Luca Hänni in 2019, "Tout l'univers" by Gjon's Tears in 2021 and "The Code" by Nemo in 2024.

=== Voting ===
Each participating broadcaster assembled a jury panel with at least eleven members. The jurors awarded 1-8, 10, and 12 points to their top ten songs.

Points awarded to Switzerland
Score	Country
12 points	France; Germany; Luxembourg
10 points	Denmark; Italy; United Kingdom
8 points	Belgium; Netherlands; Slovenia
7 points	Greece; Ireland
6 points	Austria; Cyprus; Sweden
5 points	Malta
4 points	Finland; Iceland; Israel
3 points	Norway; Spain
2 points	Croatia
1 point	Portugal

Points awarded by Switzerland
Score	Country
12 points	Ireland
10 points	Norway
8 points	Sweden
7 points	Malta
6 points	Spain
5 points	United Kingdom
4 points	France
3 points	Croatia
2 points	Germany
1 point	Italy
