= Finland in the Eurovision Song Contest 1993 =

- Eurovision Song Contest 1993
- Participating broadcaster: Yleisradio (Yle)
- Country: Finland
- Selection process: Euroviisut 1993
- Selection date: 6 March 1993

Competing entry
- Song: "Tule luo"
- Artist: Katri Helena
- Songwriters: Matti Puurtinen; Jukka Saarinen

Placement
- Final result: 17th, 20 points

Participation chronology

Finland was represented at the Eurovision Song Contest 1993 with the song "Tule luo", composed by Matti Puurtinen, with lyrics by Jukka Saarinen, and performed by Katri Helena. The Finnish participating broadcaster, Yleisradio (Yle), selected its entry in the contest through a national final. This was Katri Helena's second Eurovision appearance, 14 years after represent Finland in 1979.

== Before Eurovision ==
=== Euroviisut 1993 ===
Due to the early 1990s depression in Finland, the competition was held as small-scale as possible. Yleisradio (Yle) invited eight composers for the competition, and invited four singers (Arja Koriseva, Katri Helena, Marjorie, and Paula Koivuniemi) to perform the songs, each with two songs. Yle held the national final, Euroviisut 1993, at its television studios in Helsinki, hosted by Ari Korvola. The winner was chosen by voting from eleven regional juries. Each jury group distributed their points as follows: 1–6, 8 and 10 points.

In addition to the performances of the competing entries, the interval acts featured Helen Hoffner performing "Summer of Love" and "Holy River", and Niklas Strömstedt performing "I hennes rum" and "När vindarna vill".

Final – 6 March 1993
R/O	Artist	Song	Songwriter(s)	Points	Place
1	Paula Koivuniemi	"Päivä kerrallaan"	Erik Lindström, VeePee Lehto	37	6
2	Katri Helena	"Tule luo"	Matti Puurtinen, Jukka Saarinen	96	1
3	Arja Koriseva	"Vain taivas yksin tietää"	Kisu Jernström, Kassu Halonen, Vexi Salmi	65	3
4	Marjorie	"Legenda"	Cris Owen, Pia Partanen	52	4
5	Paula Koivuniemi	"Sammunut rakkaus"	Esa Nieminen, Kaisu Liuhala	21	8
6	Katri Helena	"Viesti"	Jukka Kuoppamäki	48	5
7	Arja Koriseva	"Sulta laulun sain"	Olli Ahvenlahti, Hector	77	2
8	Marjorie	"Aika eteenpäin vain kulkee"	Pepe Willberg, Kirsti Willberg	33	7

Detailed Regional Jury Votes
R/O	Song	Rovaniemi	Kajaani	Vaasa	Jyväskylä	Joensuu	Lappeenranta	Pori	Tampere	Lahti	Turku	Helsinki	Total
1	"Päivä kerrallaan"	4	2	5	1	2	4	3	4	1	1	10	37
2	"Tule luo"	10	10	10	10	10	8	5	8	10	10	5	96
3	"Vain taivas yksin tietää"	5	5	8	5	8	5	4	6	8	8	3	65
4	"Legenda"	8	8	2	2	5	6	6	3	2	4	6	52
5	"Sammunut rakkaus"	1	1	3	4	1	1	1	2	3	3	1	21
6	"Viesti"	2	4	4	8	4	2	8	5	5	2	4	48
7	"Sulta laulun sain"	3	6	6	6	6	10	10	10	6	6	8	77
8	"Aika eteenpäin vain kulkee"	6	3	1	3	3	3	2	1	4	5	2	33

== At Eurovision ==
On the night of the final Katri Helena performed 17th in the running order, following Slovenia and preceding Bosnia and Herzegovina. Katri Helena was accompanied by Pave Maijanen and Pepe Willberg as backing vocalists and accordionists, and Anita Pajunen as backing vocalist. Katri Helena's costume was designed by Jukka Rintala. At the close of voting "Tule luo" had received 20 points (the highest an 8 from Greece), placing Finland 17th of the 25 entries. The Finnish jury awarded its 12 points to Norway.

=== Voting ===
Points awarded to Finland
Score	Country
12 points	
10 points	
8 points	Greece
7 points	
6 points	
5 points	Iceland
4 points	
3 points	Turkey
2 points	Malta; Luxembourg
1 point	

Points awarded by Finland
Score	Country
12 points	Norway
10 points	Spain
8 points	Italy
7 points	Sweden
6 points	Greece
5 points	United Kingdom
4 points	Switzerland
3 points	Ireland
2 points	Portugal
1 point	France
