= Austria in the Eurovision Song Contest 1993 =

- Eurovision Song Contest 1993
- Participating broadcaster: Österreichischer Rundfunk (ORF)
- Country: Austria
- Selection process: Artist: Internal selection Song: National final
- Selection date: 30 March 1993

Competing entry
- Song: "Maria Magdalena"
- Artist: Tony Wegas
- Songwriters: Christian Kolonovits; Johann Bertl; Thomas Spitzer

Placement
- Final result: 14th, 32 points

Participation chronology

Austria was represented at the Eurovision Song Contest 1993 with the song "Maria Magdalena", composed by Christian Kolonovits and Johann Bertl, with lyrics by Thomas Spitzer, and performed by Tony Wegas. The Austrian participating broadcaster Österreichischer Rundfunk (ORF), selected its entry through a national final, after having previously selected the performer internally.

== Before Eurovision ==
=== Internal selection ===
Österreichischer Rundfunk (ORF) internally selected Tony Wegas, who had represented Austria in 1992, as its representative for the Eurovision Song Contest 1993.

=== National final ===
ORF held a national final to select the competing song at Eurovision, with seven songs, all sung by Wegas, presented. In February 1993 the seven songs were played on the radio, with the public invited to vote for their favourite entry by postcard voting. On 30 March 1993, a television programme, held at the ORF TV studios in Vienna and hosted by Andreas Steppan and Michael Niavarani, was shown by ORF with pre-recorded videos of the seven entries, afterwards the results of the voting were announced.

15,245 postcards were received by ORF for the contest with the winning song, "Maria Magdalena", receiving 6,170 postcards in total.

Final – 30 March 1993
R/O	Song	Place
1	"Einfach so"	2
2	"Nie wieder"	4
3	"Maria Magdalena"	1
4	"Mitten in der Nacht"	3
5	"Es wird alles gut"	6
6	"La luna"	5
7	"Tief in mir"	7

== At Eurovision ==
Wegas performed 10th on the night of the contest, following Iceland and preceding Portugal. At the close of the voting the song had received 32 points, placing 14th in a field of 25.

=== Voting ===
Points awarded to Austria
Score	Country
12 points	Bosnia and Herzegovina
10 points	
8 points	
7 points	
6 points	Ireland
5 points	
4 points	Turkey
3 points	Belgium; France; United Kingdom
2 points	
1 point	Greece

Points awarded by Austria
Score	Country
12 points	United Kingdom
10 points	Sweden
8 points	Ireland
7 points	France
6 points	Switzerland
5 points	Portugal
4 points	Malta
3 points	Netherlands
2 points	Spain
1 point	Iceland
