= Bosnia and Herzegovina in the Eurovision Song Contest 1993 =

- Eurovision Song Contest 1993
- Participating broadcaster: Radiotelevision of Bosnia-Herzegovina (RTVBiH)
- Country: Bosnia and Herzegovina
- Selection process: BH Eurosong 1993
- Selection date: 28 February 1993

Competing entry
- Song: "Sva bol svijeta"
- Artist: Fazla
- Songwriters: Dino Dervišhalidović; Fahrudin Pecikoza

Placement
- Final result: 16th, 27 points

Participation chronology

Bosnia and Herzegovina was represented at the Eurovision Song Contest 1993 with the song "Sva bol svijeta", composed by Dino Dervišhalidović, with lyrics by Fahrudin Pecikoza, and performed by Fazla. The Bosnian-Herzegovinian participating broadcaster, Radiotelevision of Bosnia-Herzegovina (RTVBiH), selected its entry for the contest through a national final. This was the first-ever entry from independent Bosnia and Herzegovina in the Eurovision Song Contest.

== Background ==
During the disintegration of Yugoslavia, the state broadcaster at the time, Jugoslavenska radiotelevizija (JRT), decided to continue its participation in Eurovision, holding one last national final for the 1992 contest, held on 28 March 1992. Only the broadcasters from the republics of Serbia, Montenegro, and Bosnia and Herzegovina competed in the national final, despite the latter declaring independence on 1 March. The broadcasters from Croatia, Slovenia, and Macedonia did not compete after their countries declaring independence from Yugoslavia in 1991. The winning song was "Ljubim te pesmama" by Extra Nena, representing Serbia. However, by the time Extra Nena competed at Eurovision for Yugoslavia, the Socialist Federal Republic of Yugoslavia had already ceased to exist, and a new country, the Federal Republic of Yugoslavia, had been formed.

After the 1992 contest, Bosnia and Herzegovina's former sub-national Yugoslav broadcaster RTV Sarajevo became the country's national broadcaster, renamed Radiotelevision of Bosnia-Herzegovina (Bosnian: Radiotelevizija Bosne i Hercegovine; RTVBiH). The broadcaster became a member of the European Broadcasting Union (EBU) on 1 January 1993, allowing it to compete in the Eurovision Song Contest for the first time representing Bosnia and Herzegovina as an independent nation.

== Before Eurovision ==
=== BH Eurosong 1993 ===
RTVBiH decided to hold a national final to select its first entry in Eurovision. The broadcaster held BH Eurosong 1993 on 28 February at its television studios in Sarajevo, hosted by Ismeta Krvavac, who had previously represented Yugoslavia in 1976 as the lead singer of the group Ambasadori. A total of 43 songs were submitted to the contest, out of which 11 songs were selected to compete to be the first entry for the independent country. The group Nina, who competed with "Zapleši", were unable to get to the studio, and so a video-clip of their song was presented instead. Only the winner of the contest was announced, with an expert jury selecting the winner.

The winner was Fazla with the song "Sva bol svijeta". The song describes the Bosnian War occurring at that time in Bosnia and Herzegovina. Alma Čardžić was rumoured to have come second with "Svi na ulice", however this was never confirmed.

Final – 28 February 1993
R/O	Artist	Song
1	Fazla	"Sva bol svijeta"
2	Monia Sušac	"Ti i ja"
3	Grupa Izvođača	"Srce Evrope"
4	Nina	"Zapleši"
5	Fuad Buzadžić	"Vrijeme ljubavi"
6	Dražen Žerić	"Monroe"
7	Davorin Popović	"Raspored zvijezda"
8	Alma Čardžić	"Svi na ulice"
9	Edo and Adi Mulahalilović	"Bosna će još pjevati"
10	Selver Brdarić	"Mona Liza"
11	Alen Mustafić	"Ljeto i maline"

== At Kvalifikacija za Millstreet ==
In the early 1990s, the number of broadcasters eligible to participate in the Eurovision Song Contest increased significantly with the disintegration of Yugoslavia and the subsequent admission into the European Broadcasting Union (EBU) of the broadcasters of the countries that emerged from the breakup. The merger of the EBU with its Eastern European counterpart, the International Radio and Television Organisation (OIRT), further expanded the number of broadcasters by including those from countries of the former Eastern Bloc. The broadcasters from seven of those new countries confirmed their intentions to debut at the 1993 contest. With this large influx of participants, the EBU was forced to create a new measure to counter overcrowding in the contest. The EBU decided to hold a one-off qualification round to select the entries from three of those seven new countries, which would join the entries from the twenty-two countries already competing in the Eurovision Song Contest.

The Kvalifikacija za Millstreet (Qualification for Millstreet) contest was held in Ljubljana, Slovenia on 3 April at the television studios of Slovene broadcaster Radiotelevizija Slovenija (RTVSLO). Seven countries in total competed, including Bosnia and Herzegovina, for a place in the final on 15 May 1993. Fazla performed first, preceding Croatia. The band received 52 points, placing 2nd, qualifying to the Eurovision Song Contest final alongside Slovenia and Croatia.

=== Voting ===
Points awarded to Bosnia and Herzegovina
Score	Country
12 points	Slovakia
10 points	Hungary; Romania
8 points	Estonia
7 points	Slovenia
6 points	
5 points	Croatia

Points awarded by Bosnia and Herzegovina
Score	Country
12 points	Slovakia
10 points	Croatia
8 points	Slovenia
7 points	Hungary
6 points	Estonia
5 points	Romania

== At Eurovision ==
Fazla performed 18th at the Eurovision Song Contest 1993 in Millstreet, Ireland, following Finland and preceding the United Kingdom. He received 27 points, receiving the maximum 12 points from Turkey, placing 16th of the 25 competing countries.

Static in the telephone line was clearly heard during the voting, as the Bosnian spokesperson attempted to read the points, as the organizers had to use satellite connection to get a link since most of the telephone lines were down in the country during that time.

=== Voting ===
Points awarded to Bosnia and Herzegovina
Score	Country
12 points	Turkey
10 points	
8 points	
7 points	
6 points	
5 points	
4 points	France; Malta
3 points	Ireland; Italy
2 points	
1 point	Belgium

Points awarded by Bosnia and Herzegovina
Score	Country
12 points	Austria
10 points	Netherlands
8 points	Ireland
7 points	Norway
6 points	Spain
5 points	Denmark
4 points	Malta
3 points	United Kingdom
2 points	Turkey
1 point	Slovenia
