= Portugal in the Eurovision Song Contest 1993 =

- Eurovision Song Contest 1993
- Participating broadcaster: Radiotelevisão Portuguesa (RTP)
- Country: Portugal
- Selection process: Festival da Canção 1993
- Selection date: 11 March 1993

Competing entry
- Song: "A cidade (até ser dia)"
- Artist: Anabela
- Songwriters: Pedro Abrantes; Marco Quelhas; Paulo de Carvalho

Placement
- Final result: 10th, 60 points

Participation chronology

Portugal was represented at the Eurovision Song Contest 1993 with the song "A cidade (até ser dia)", written by Pedro Abrantes, Marco Quelhas, and Paulo de Carvalho, and performed by Anabela. The Portuguese participating broadcaster, Radiotelevisão Portuguesa (RTP), selected its entry at the Festival da Canção 1993.

== Before Eurovision ==
=== Festival da Canção 1993 ===
Radiotelevisão Portuguesa (RTP) used the popular Festival da Canção to select its entry for the Eurovision Song Contest 1993.

==== Format ====
The format for the 1993 Portuguese selection was similar to that of the previous year, but with a few adjustments. Once again, there would be five semi-finals, and the qualifiers were chosen by a panel of five judges (among them former Eurovision participants Fernando Tordo, who competed in 1973, and Dulce Pontes, who competed in 1991; and future Eurovision participant Rita Guerra, who would represent her country in 2003). However, there were now four songs in each semi, and the top eight songs across all five semi-finals would compete in the final. The semi-finals were hosted by Júlio Isidro.

==== Semi-finals ====
R/O	Artist	Song	Points	Place	Result
Semi-final 1 – 3 January 1993
1	Paulo Brissos	"No dia seguinte"	45	1	Qualified
2	Isabel Campelo	"Praia sem marés"	43	2	Qualified
3	Jose Cid, Bragança and Ca. Lda.	"O poeta, o pintor e o músico"	41	6	Qualified
4	Piedade Fernandes	"Renascer de um trovador"	43	2	Qualified
Semi-final 2 – 10 January 1993
1	Madi	"Fantasia"	24	15	—N/a
2	Grupo Até Jazz	"Pó de melhorar"	42	4	Qualified
3	Cristina Roque	"Quero muito mais de ti"	38	7	Qualified
4	Anabela	"A cidade (até ser dia)"	42	4	Qualified
Semi-final 3 – 17 January 1993
1	Tozé Lobo	"Baila, baila"	27	13	—N/a
2	David	"Recordações (tu e eu)"	26	14	—N/a
3	Liza Mayo	"Talvez noutro lugar"	37	8	Qualified
4	Cláudia Veloso	"Pranum"	24	15	—N/a
Semi-final 4 – 24 January 1993
1	Mário Mata	"Miúda triste"	37	8	—N/a
2	David	"Foram momentos"	23	17	—N/a
3	Armando Gama	"Se eu sonhar"	34	10	—N/a
4	Mónica	"B-a-bá"	17	20	—N/a
Semi-final 5 – 31 January 1993
1	Sílvia	"Cidade do Tejo"	23	17	—N/a
2	Piedade Fernandes	"Canção do Alentejo"	28	12	—N/a
3	Olívia	"Lembrar os anos 60"	22	19	—N/a
4	Ana Paulino	"As palavras são demais"	32	11	—N/a

==== Final ====
The final was held on 11 March 1993 at the São Luiz Theatre in Lisbon and was hosted by António Sala and Margarida Mercês de Medo. The winner was decided through the votes of 22 regional juries.

The winner was "A cidade (até ser dia)," sung by Anabela and written by Pedro Abrantes, former Eurovision entrant Paulo de Carvalho, and Marco Quelhas. The song was arranged by the song writer's brother Fernando Abrantes, who also performed it at the piano live on stage together with the singer Anabela during the Eurovision final in Ireland.

Final – 11 March 1993
R/O	Artist	Song	Points	Place
1	Isabel Campelo	"Praia sem marés"	127	3
2	Cristina Roque	"Quero muito mais de ti"	115	5
3	Piedade Fernandes	"Renascer de um trovador"	122	4
4	Paulo Brissos	"No dia seguinte"	81	6
5	Liza Mayo	"Talvez noutro lugar"	72	7
6	Jose Cid, Bragança and Ca. Lda.	"O poeta, o pintor e o músico"	139	2
7	Grupo Até Jazz	"Pó de melhorar"	35	8
8	Anabela	"A cidade (até ser dia)"	167	1

== At Eurovision ==
Anabela performed 11th on the night of the contest, following Austria and preceding France. She received 60 points in total, placing 10th in a field of 25. It was the first time since 1976 that Portugal received twelve points from any other countries, with both the Netherlands and Spain awarding Portugal their highest score. Portugal themselves awarded twelve points to France.

=== Voting ===
Points awarded to Portugal
Score	Country
12 points	Netherlands; Spain
10 points	
8 points	France
7 points	
6 points	
5 points	Austria; Norway
4 points	Luxembourg
3 points	Cyprus
2 points	Finland; Greece; Iceland; Sweden
1 point	Denmark; Germany; United Kingdom

Points awarded by Portugal
Score	Country
12 points	France
10 points	Italy
8 points	Norway
7 points	United Kingdom
6 points	Ireland
5 points	Croatia
4 points	Sweden
3 points	Israel
2 points	Malta
1 point	Switzerland
