= Malta in the Eurovision Song Contest 1993 =

- Eurovision Song Contest 1993
- Participating broadcaster: Public Broadcasting Services (PBS)
- Country: Malta
- Selection process: National final
- Selection date: 13 March 1993

Competing entry
- Song: "This Time"
- Artist: William Mangion
- Songwriter: William Mangion

Placement
- Final result: 8th, 69 points

Participation chronology

Malta was represented at the Eurovision Song Contest 1993 with the song "This Time", written and performed by William Mangion. The Maltese participating broadcaster, Public Broadcasting Services (PBS), selected its entry for the contest through a national final.

== Before Eurovision ==
=== National final ===
Public Broadcasting Services (PBS) held the national final on 13 March 1993 at the Mediterranean Conference Centre in Valletta, hosted by John Demanuele and Marija Bugeja. The songs were firstly performed in Maltese, then in English. Only the top 3 were announced.

R/O	Artist	Song		Place
R/O	Artist	Maltese version	English version	Place
1	Paul Giordimaina	"B'vuċi waħda"	"One Voice One Heart"	-
2	Moira Stafrace	"In-nies li taf"	"Love Me Till The End"	-
3	William Mangion	"Issa"	"This Time"	1
4	Bayzo and Claudette Pace	"L-għanja ta' ħajti"	"You Are My Music"	-
5	Mike Spiteri	"Ġmiel il-ward u l-mużika"	"Roses, Stars and Love Songs"	-
6	Marita and Jon Lukas	"Żommni u għannaqni"	"Love We Share"	2
7	Renato	"Rajtek"	"Seems Like Yesterday"	-
8	Alex Schembri	"F'mument"	"Woman"	3

== At Eurovision ==
William Mangion performed 8th on the night of the contest, following Belgium and preceding Iceland. At the close of the voting the song had received 66 points, placing 8th of 25.

=== Voting ===
Points awarded to Malta
Score	Country
12 points	
10 points	
8 points	
7 points	Italy; Switzerland
6 points	United Kingdom
5 points	Denmark; Greece; Turkey
4 points	Austria; Bosnia and Herzegovina; Croatia; Germany; Spain; Sweden
3 points	Israel
2 points	France; Ireland; Portugal
1 point	Cyprus

Points awarded by Malta
Score	Country
12 points	Ireland
10 points	Luxembourg
8 points	Spain
7 points	Italy
6 points	Greece
5 points	Switzerland
4 points	Bosnia and Herzegovina
3 points	Netherlands
2 points	Finland
1 point	Slovenia
