= Slovenia in the Eurovision Song Contest 1993 =

- Eurovision Song Contest 1993
- Participating broadcaster: Radiotelevizija Slovenija (RTVSLO)
- Country: Slovenia
- Selection process: Slovenski izbor za Pesem Evrovizije 1993
- Selection date: 27 February 1993

Competing entry
- Song: "Tih deževen dan"
- Artist: 1X Band
- Songwriters: Cole Moretti; Tomaž Kosec

Placement
- Final result: 22nd, 9 points

Participation chronology

Slovenia was represented at the Eurovision Song Contest 1993 with the song "Tih deževen dan", composed by Cole Moretti, with lyrics by Tomaž Kosec, and performed by 1X Band. The Slovene participating broadcaster, Radiotelevizija Slovenija (RTVSLO), held a national final in order to select its entry for the contest. This was the first-ever entry from independent Slovenia in the Eurovision Song Contest.

== Before Eurovision ==
=== National final ===
Radiotelevizija Slovenija (RTVSLO) held a national final to select its entry for the Eurovision Song Contest 1993. RTVSLO opened a submission period for artists and songwriters to submit sheet music, lyrics, and a recorded demo of candidate songs from November until 31 December 1992. By the end of the submission period, forty entries had been submitted. A selection committee consisting of Zlati Klun, Anton Natek, Djuro Penzes, Marko Prpić, Vlado Senica, Ivo Umek, and chaired by Jani Golob, was tasked with selecting a maximum of twelve entries for the national final on 5 January 1993.

The national final was held on 27 February at 20:30 CET, and was named "Eurosong '93 (Izbor Slovenske Popevke)" in TV guides. The contest was held in Studio 1 of RTVSLO in Ljubljana, hosted by Tajda Lekše. The running order for the national final was drawn on 9 February 1993. The results of the national final were decided by five-member juries in twelve local Slovenian radio stations. The Trbovlje jury was overseen by Nataša Bolčina-Žgavec, and consisted of Jože Naglav, Vanda Kopušar, Luka Pišljar, Sanda Hribar, with Tomaž Štojs as president.

The national final is known to have been broadcast live on television on TV SLO 1, then repeated on the same channel on the next day at 13:05 CET; and on radio on Radio Trbovlje.

Final – 27 February 1993
R/O	Artist	Song	Points	Place
1	Maddalena de Andrea	"Ko bo maj"	5	12
2	E.T.	"Svet za oba"	49	8
3	Dominik Kozarič	"Tina"	25	11
4	Faraoni	"Sonce sreče"	52	7
5	Čudežna polja	"Nekdo igra klavir"	59	6
6	Darja Švajger	"Naj vidimo ljudi"	98	2
7	1X Band	"Tih deževen dan"	107	1
8	Alenka Godec	"Tisti si ti"	81	3
9	Miran Rudan Band	"Prepozno je za vse"	39	10
10	Roberto Buljevič	"Daj odpri"	48	9
11	Helena Blagne	"Vzemi me nocoj"	63	5
12	Regina	"Naj ljubezen združi vse ljudi"	70	4

Detailed Regional Jury Votes
R/O	Song	Ljubljana	Maribor	Koper	Murska Sobota	Celje	Trbovlje	Novo Mesto	Kranj	Slovenj Gradec	Brežice	Ptuj	Jesenice	Total
1	"Ko bo maj"	1		2				2						5
2	"Svet za oba"	2	3	1	4	8	8	1	6	2	10	4		49
3	"Tina"	4	2	4		4	6		3				2	25
4	"Sonce sreče"	3	1	10	6	2	3	4	1	5	7	7	3	52
5	"Nekdo igra klavir"	10	10		3	1		5		4	8	12	6	59
6	"Naj vidimo ljudi"	8	12	12	8	12	2	3	10	3	12	8	8	98
7	"Tih deževen dan"	12	7	8	12	10	12	12	8	10	6	5	5	107
8	"Tisti si ti"	7	8	5	5	7	7	7	12	12	5	2	4	81
9	"Prepozno za vse"		5	3	1	3	4	8	4	7	2	1	1	39
10	"Daj odpri"			6	2	5	5	6	7	1	3	3	10	48
11	"Vzemi me nocoj"	5	6		7	6	1	10	2	8	1	10	7	63
12	"Naj ljubezen združi vse ljudi"	6	4	7	10		10		5	6	4	6	12	70

== At Kvalifikacija za Millstreet ==
In the early 1990s, the number of broadcasters eligible to participate in the Eurovision Song Contest increased significantly with the disintegration of Yugoslavia and the subsequent admission into the European Broadcasting Union (EBU) of the broadcasters of the countries that emerged from the breakup. The merger of the EBU with its Eastern European counterpart, the International Radio and Television Organisation (OIRT), further expanded the number of broadcasters by including those from countries of the former Eastern Bloc. The broadcasters from seven of those new countries confirmed their intentions to debut at the 1993 contest. With this large influx of participants, the EBU was forced to create a new measure to counter overcrowding in the contest. The EBU decided to hold a one-off qualification round to select the entries from three of those seven new countries, which would join the entries from the 22 countries already competing in the Eurovision Song Contest.

Kvalifikacija za Millstreet (Qualification for Millstreet) was held by RTVSLO in its television studios in Ljubljana on 3 April 1993. Seven countries competed for the three spots in the final. Slovenia received 54 points, placing 1st in the contest and qualified to the final of the contest, along with Bosnia and Herzegovina and Croatia.

=== Voting ===
Points awarded to Slovenia
Score	Country
12 points	Romania
10 points	Estonia; Slovakia
8 points	Bosnia and Herzegovina
7 points	Croatia; Hungary
6 points	
5 points	

Points awarded by Slovenia
Score	Country
12 points	Estonia
10 points	Slovakia
8 points	Croatia
7 points	Bosnia and Herzegovina
6 points	Hungary
5 points	Romania

== At Eurovision ==
At Millstreet, 1X Band performed 16th in the running order, following Luxembourg and preceding Finland. Slovenia received 9 points, placing 22nd in a field of 25. As such, Slovenia were forced to sit out the following contest due to new relegation rules which forced the lowest-placed countries to withdraw. Slovenia would return to Eurovision in 1995.

The contest was broadcast on SLO 1, with commentary by Tajda Lekše. It was also broadcast on radio station Val 202.

=== Voting ===
Points awarded to Slovenia
Score	Country
12 points	
10 points	
8 points	
7 points	
6 points	
5 points	
4 points	Italy
3 points	Sweden
2 points	
1 point	Bosnia and Herzegovina; Malta

Points awarded by Slovenia
Score	Country
12 points	Ireland
10 points	United Kingdom
8 points	Switzerland
7 points	Netherlands
6 points	Sweden
5 points	Iceland
4 points	France
3 points	Norway
2 points	Spain
1 point	Luxembourg
