= Turkey in the Eurovision Song Contest 1993 =

- Eurovision Song Contest 1993
- Participating broadcaster: Turkish Radio and Television Corporation (TRT)
- Country: Turkey
- Selection process: 17. Eurovision Şarkı Yarışması Türkiye Finali
- Selection date: 13 March 1993

Competing entry
- Song: "Esmer Yarim"
- Artist: Burak Aydos
- Songwriter: Burak Aydos

Placement
- Final result: 21st, 10 points

Participation chronology

Turkey was represented at the Eurovision Song Contest 1993 with the song "Esmer Yarim", written and performed by Burak Aydos. The Turkish participating broadcaster, the Turkish Radio and Television Corporation (TRT), selected its entry through a national final.

== Before Eurovision ==
=== 17. Eurovision Şarkı Yarışması Türkiye Finali ===
The Turkish broadcaster, the Turkish Radio and Television Corporation (TRT), held a national final to select its entry for the Eurovision Song Contest 1993, held in Millstreet, Ireland.

The final took place on 13 March 1993 at the Andromeda discotheque in Istanbul, hosted by Ömer Önder. Eight songs competed and the winner was determined by the audience present in the Andromeda. Only the top 3 songs were announced.

Final – 13 March 1993
R/O	Artist	Song	Lyricists	Composer	Place
1	Deniz Şafak Yaprak	"Son Senfoni"	Figen Çakmak	Figen Çakmak	3
2	Şebnem Özsaran & Grubu	"Biz Çocuklar"	Kadriye Bayraşa, Şebnem Özsaran	Müfit Bayraşa	—
3	Erdal Çelik	"Yanımda Olmazsan"	Soner Arıca,	Aslıgül Ayas	—
4	Sinan Erkoç & Grup 34 TR 93	"Son Gece"	Nurhan Gürdil	Tolga Gürdil	2
5	Sonat Bağcan & Seda Bağcan	"Yarın Çok Güzel Olmalıyım Anne"	Savaş Bağcan	Savaş Bağcan	—
6	Şebnem Özsaran	"Gülümse"	Oya El-Cherbiny, Şebnem Özsaran	Zafer Çebi	—
7	Burak Aydos, Serter Öztürk & Barbaros Öztürk	"Esmer Yarim"	Burak Aydos	Burak Aydos	1
8	Grup Pi	"Seviyorum"	Çetin Akcan	Ali Otyam	—

== At Eurovision ==
The contest was broadcast by TRT 1 (with commentary by Bülend Özveren).

Aydos performed second on the night of the contest, following Italy and preceding Germany. He received 10 points in total, placing 21st in a field of 25, relegating the country from taking part in the 1994 Contest. The Turkish jury awarded its 12 points to Bosnia and Herzegovina.

TRT appointed Ömer Önder as the jury spokesperson for Turkey.

=== Voting ===
Points awarded to Turkey
Score	Country
12 points	
10 points	
8 points	
7 points	
6 points	Spain
5 points	
4 points	
3 points	
2 points	Bosnia and Herzegovina
1 point	Croatia; Iceland

Points awarded by Turkey
Score	Country
12 points	Bosnia and Herzegovina
10 points	Norway
8 points	United Kingdom
7 points	France
6 points	Netherlands
5 points	Malta
4 points	Austria
3 points	Finland
2 points	Greece
1 point	Ireland
