= Ireland in the Eurovision Song Contest 1993 =

- Eurovision Song Contest 1993
- Participating broadcaster: Radio Telefís Éireann (RTÉ)
- Country: Ireland
- Selection process: Eurosong '93
- Selection date: 14 March 1993

Competing entry
- Song: "In Your Eyes"
- Artist: Niamh Kavanagh
- Songwriter: Jimmy Walsh

Placement
- Final result: 1st, 187 points

Participation chronology

Ireland was represented at the Eurovision Song Contest 1993 with the song "In Your Eyes", written by Jimmy Walsh, and performed by Niamh Kavanagh. The Irish participating broadcaster, Radio Telefís Éireann (RTÉ), selected its entry through a national final, which ultimately won the contest. In addition, RTÉ was also the host broadcaster and staged the event at the Green Glens Arena in Millstreet, after winning the previous edition with the song "Why Me?" by Linda Martin.

== Before Eurovision ==
=== Eurosong '93 ===
Radio Telefís Éireann (RTÉ) held Eurosong '93 on 14 March 1993 at the Point Theatre in Dublin, hosted by Pat Kenny. Eight songs competed to represent the host country at the Eurovision Song Contest 1993, with the final winner selected by the votes of ten regional juries.

R/O	Artist	Song	Points	Place
1	Niamh Kavanagh	"In Your Eyes"	118	1
2	Suzanne Bushnell	"Long Gone"	54	7
3	Patricia Roe	"If You Changed Your Mind"	75	3
4	Róisín Ní hAodha	"Mo mhúirnín óg"	34	8
5	Champ	"2nd Time Around"	79	2
6	Off the Record	"Hold Out"	61	6
7	Dav McNamara	"Stay"	67	4
8	Perfect Timing	"Why Aren't We Talking Anyway"	62	5

Detailed Regional Jury Votes
R/O	Song	Athlone	Cavan	Dublin	Dundalk	Dungloe	Galway	Limerick	Listowel	Millstreet	Waterford	Total
1	"In Your Eyes"	12	10	12	12	12	12	12	12	12	12	118
2	"Long Gone"	5	4	8	10	3	4	8	4	4	4	54
3	"If You Changed Your Mind"	10	5	6	6	5	10	5	10	8	10	75
4	"Mo mhúirnín óg"	4	3	5	3	4	3	3	3	3	3	34
5	"2nd Time Around"	8	12	10	4	8	8	10	6	6	7	79
6	"Hold Out"	3	8	3	8	6	7	7	8	5	6	61
7	"Stay"	7	7	7	5	10	5	6	5	7	8	67
8	"Why Aren't We Talking Anyway?"	6	6	4	7	7	6	4	7	10	5	62

== At Eurovision ==
Niamh Kavanagh represented for the host country on 15 May in Millstreet, performing 14th in the running order, following Sweden and preceding Luxembourg. Kavanagh received 187 points, receiving the maximum 12 points a total of 7 times and receiving at least one point from every competing nation. This was Ireland's fifth victory in the contest, and as such, RTÉ would be the host of the following contest (they did not decline to host, unlike Luxembourg after its 1973 victory and Israel after its 1979 victory).

=== Voting ===
Points awarded to Ireland
Score	Country
12 points	Italy; Malta; Norway; Slovenia; Sweden; Switzerland; United Kingdom
10 points	France; Netherlands; Spain
8 points	Austria; Bosnia and Herzegovina
7 points	Cyprus; Luxembourg
6 points	Croatia; Denmark; Greece; Portugal
5 points	Germany; Israel
4 points	
3 points	Finland; Iceland
2 points	Belgium
1 point	Turkey

Points awarded by Ireland
Score	Country
12 points	Netherlands
10 points	France
8 points	United Kingdom
7 points	Switzerland
6 points	Austria
5 points	Norway
4 points	Germany
3 points	Bosnia and Herzegovina
2 points	Malta
1 point	Iceland
