= United Kingdom in the Eurovision Song Contest 1993 =

- Eurovision Song Contest 1993
- Participating broadcaster: British Broadcasting Corporation (BBC)
- Country: United Kingdom
- Selection process: Artist: Internal selection Song: A Song for Europe 1993
- Selection date: 9 April 1993

Competing entry
- Song: "Better the Devil You Know"
- Artist: Sonia
- Songwriters: Brian Teasdale; Dean Collinson

Placement
- Final result: 2nd, 164 points

Participation chronology

The United Kingdom was represented at the Eurovision Song Contest 1993 with the song "Better the Devil You Know", written by Brian Teasdale and Dean Collinson, and performed by Sonia. The British participating broadcaster, the British Broadcasting Corporation (BBC), selected its entry through a national final, after having previously selected the performer internally.

== Before Eurovision ==
=== Artist selection ===
A shortlist of artists included by the British Broadcasting Corporation (BBC) was presented to the Head of Delegations of each participating country in the Eurovision Song Contest that ultimately selected the British entrant. The BBC revealed Sonia as its representative for the Eurovision Song Contest 1993.

=== A Song for Europe 1993 ===
Two songs each, both performed by Sonia, were premiered during four preview programmes on BBC1 between 14 March and 4 April 1993. The final, held at the BBC Television Centre in London and hosted by Terry Wogan, was filmed on 8 April 1993 and televised on 9 April 1993. The show was broadcast on BBC1 and BBC Radio 2 with commentary by Ken Bruce. A public televote selected the winning song, "Better the Devil You Know", which was revealed during a separate show broadcast on BBC1 and hosted by Terry Wogan.

A Song for Europe 1993 – 9 April 1993
| R/O | Song | Songwriter(s) | Televote | Place |
|---|---|---|---|---|
| 1 | "A Little Love" | Ian Curnow, Phil Harding, Shaun Imrei | 55,053 | 4 |
| 2 | "I'm Gonna Put a Spell on You" | Shaun Imrei, Graham Stack | 27,795 | 6 |
| 3 | "Life After Love" | David Harwood-Smith, Roger Graham Taylor | 38,308 | 5 |
| 4 | "It's Just a Matter of Time" | Alan Glass, Gary Benson | 18,251 | 8 |
| 5 | "Better the Devil You Know" | Dean Collinson, Brian Teasdale | 156,955 | 1 |
| 6 | "Our World" | Johnny Warman, Nick Graham | 77,695 | 2 |
| 7 | "So Much of Your Love" | Pat McGlynn, Jane Andrews | 70,454 | 3 |
| 8 | "Trust" | Simon Stirling, Geoffrey Williams, Phil Manikiza | 26,745 | 7 |

== At Eurovision ==
Twenty five countries participated in the final of the Eurovision Song Contest, held at the Green Glens Arena in Millstreet, Ireland on 15 May. "Better the Devil You Know" was placed second with 164 points. It received points from every country apart from Greece and Malta.

=== Voting ===
Points awarded to the United Kingdom
| Score | Country |
|---|---|
| 12 points | Austria; Belgium; Iceland; Israel |
| 10 points | Croatia; Slovenia; Sweden |
| 8 points | Denmark; Ireland; Luxembourg; Norway; Turkey |
| 7 points | Portugal |
| 6 points | France; Germany |
| 5 points | Finland; Spain; Switzerland |
| 4 points | Cyprus; Netherlands |
| 3 points | Bosnia and Herzegovina |
| 2 points | |
| 1 point | Italy |

Points awarded by the United Kingdom
| Score | Country |
|---|---|
| 12 points | Ireland |
| 10 points | Switzerland |
| 8 points | Croatia |
| 7 points | Sweden |
| 6 points | Malta |
| 5 points | Cyprus |
| 4 points | France |
| 3 points | Austria |
| 2 points | Iceland |
| 1 point | Portugal |
