= Norway in the Eurovision Song Contest 1993 =

- Eurovision Song Contest 1993
- Participating broadcaster: Norsk rikskringkasting (NRK)
- Country: Norway
- Selection process: Melodi Grand Prix 1993
- Selection date: 6 March 1993

Competing entry
- Song: "Alle mine tankar"
- Artist: Silje Vige
- Songwriter: Bjørn Erik Vige

Placement
- Final result: 5th, 120 points

Participation chronology

Norway was represented at the Eurovision Song Contest 1993 with the song "Alle mine tankar", written by Bjørn Erik Vige, and performed by 16-year-old Silje Vige. The Norwegian participating broadcaster, Norsk rikskringkasting (NRK), selected its entry through the Melodi Grand Prix 1993.

== Before Eurovision ==
=== Melodi Grand Prix 1993 ===
Norsk rikskringkasting (NRK) held the Melodi Grand Prix 1993 on 6 March at Chateau Neuf in Oslo, hosted by Ingunn Kyrkjebø. Eight songs took part with the winner being chosen by voting from eight regional juries. Other participants included three-time Norwegian representative and MGP regular Jahn Teigen, the previous year's singer Merethe Trøan, and Tor Endresen who would represent Norway in 1997.

Final – 6 March 1993
| R/O | Artist | Song | Songwriter(s) | Points | Place |
|---|---|---|---|---|---|
| 1 | Rune Larsen and Helge Nilsen | "Det skulle vært sommer" | Ove Thue | 37 | 7 |
| 2 | Toni Gundersen | "Roser i regn" | Glenn Kringlebotten, Magne Skålnes | 48 | 4 |
| 3 | New Jordal Swingers | "Comeback" | Tom Pettersen | 47 | 5 |
| 4 | Silje Vige | "Alle mine tankar" | Bjørn Erik Vige | 75 | 1 |
| 5 | Stein Hauge and Kim Fairchild | "Foruten vind" | Are Selheim | 57 | 2 |
| 6 | Tor Endresen | "Hva" | Rolf Løvland | 53 | 3 |
| 7 | Merethe Trøan | "Din egen stjerne" | Per Berge Johannessen | 46 | 6 |
| 8 | Jahn Teigen | "Jackpot" | Jahn Teigen | 27 | 8 |

Detailed Regional Jury Votes
| R/O | Song | Drammen | Ålesund | Fredrikstad | Kristiansand | Trondheim | Bergen | Lillehammer | Karasjok | Oslo | Tromsø | Total |
|---|---|---|---|---|---|---|---|---|---|---|---|---|
| 1 | "Det skulle vært sommer" | 2 | 1 | 3 | 1 | 5 | 2 | 2 | 6 | 10 | 5 | 37 |
| 2 | "Roser i regn" | 8 | 3 | 2 | 2 | 6 | 10 | 1 | 5 | 8 | 3 | 48 |
| 3 | "Comeback" | 3 | 5 | 10 | 8 | 1 | 3 | 3 | 10 | 2 | 2 | 47 |
| 4 | "Alle mine tankar" | 10 | 6 | 6 | 10 | 10 | 8 | 8 | 2 | 5 | 10 | 75 |
| 5 | "Foruten vind" | 5 | 8 | 5 | 3 | 8 | 4 | 10 | 3 | 3 | 8 | 57 |
| 6 | "Hva" | 1 | 10 | 8 | 5 | 3 | 6 | 4 | 8 | 4 | 4 | 53 |
| 7 | "Din egen stjerne" | 4 | 4 | 4 | 4 | 4 | 5 | 5 | 4 | 6 | 6 | 46 |
| 8 | "Jackpot" | 6 | 2 | 1 | 6 | 2 | 1 | 6 | 1 | 1 | 1 | 27 |

== At Eurovision ==
On the night of the final Vige performed last in the running order, following Israel. At the close of voting "Alle mine tankar" had received 120 points, placing Norway 5th of the 25 entries, the country's first top 10 finish since 1988. The Norwegian jury awarded its 12 points to contest winners Ireland.

=== Voting ===
Points awarded to Norway
| Score | Country |
|---|---|
| 12 points | Croatia; Finland; Greece |
| 10 points | Germany; Iceland; Switzerland; Turkey |
| 8 points | Cyprus; Portugal |
| 7 points | Bosnia and Herzegovina |
| 6 points | Belgium; Netherlands |
| 5 points | Ireland |
| 4 points | |
| 3 points | Slovenia |
| 2 points | |
| 1 point | Luxembourg |

Points awarded by Norway
| Score | Country |
|---|---|
| 12 points | Ireland |
| 10 points | Netherlands |
| 8 points | United Kingdom |
| 7 points | Greece |
| 6 points | France |
| 5 points | Portugal |
| 4 points | Croatia |
| 3 points | Switzerland |
| 2 points | Iceland |
| 1 point | Spain |
