= Claude Delacroix =

Belgian musician and radio presenter

Claude Delacroix (born 1939) is a Belgian musician and radio presenter.

Delacroix has been a singer and hosted many programmes on the RTBF network, including Jeunesse 65.

He was the RTBF Belgian commentator for the Eurovision Song Contest which he did on seven occasions between the 1970 Contest and the 1993 Contest after 1993 Delacroix left the Eurovision after he was given a promotion to the head of Belgian radio. Jean-Pierre Hautier took over as commentator at the 1994 Contest. He was director of radio for RTBF in the 1990s and 2000s.

He later hosted the radio show Flash Back which is broadcast on La Première between Mondays and Fridays.
