= Put (band) =

Croatian pop band

Putokazi
- Origin: Rijeka, Croatia
- Genres: Pop
- Years active: 1983-2022
- Spinoffs: E.N.I.
- Past members: Vivien Galletta; Angela Jeličić; Melita Sedić; Naim Ajra; Petar Cucak Migliaccio; Olja Desic

Put (in Croatian: Putokazi) is a Croatian pop group from Rijeka.

It was selected from members of Putokazi, in order to appear at Eurovision Song Contest 1993 as the first representative of independent Croatia, singing "Don't Ever Cry". The members of the group were Vivien Galletta, Angela Jeličić, Melita Sedić, Naim Ajra, Petar Cucak Migliaccio and Olja Desic.

Prior to Eurovision, they participated in the Croatian Eurovision Song Contest in Opatija, where they won after a decision by the Varaždin jury. In the Eurovision Song Contest 1993, they placed 15th with 31 points. Their song, Don't Ever Cry, has 2 different versions in Croatian and English. The lyrics were sometimes swapped a bit between the versions. They released the CD/single of the song in 1993.

The song "Don't Ever Cry" was about The Croatian War of Independence, with the time being from 31st of March, 1991 to the 8th of August, 1995. During the war, this song was published and sent to the Eurovision Song Contest.

Putokazi had other songs that were popular in Croatia after Eurovision, like "Naranča" and "Tararajčica". Putokazi created a total of 5 albums, which are: Good Morning, Musicals, The End Collection - 10 Classics of Film Music, Zemlja (Earth), Druga Zemlja (Second Earth), Treća Zemlja (Third Earth).

Preceded by none	Croatia in the Eurovision Song Contest; 1993	Succeeded by Tony Cetinski with "Nek' ti bude ljubav sva"
