= Eurovision Song Contest 1993 =

International song competition

Date and venue
- Final: 15 May 1993
- Venue: Green Glens Arena; Millstreet, Ireland

Organisation
- Organiser: European Broadcasting Union (EBU)
- Scrutineer: Christian Clausen

Production
- Host broadcaster: Radio Telefís Éireann (RTÉ)
- Director: Anita Notaro
- Executive producer: Liam Miller
- Musical director: Noel Kelehan
- Presenter: Fionnuala Sweeney

Participants
- Number of entries: 25
- Debuting countries: Bosnia and Herzegovina; Croatia; Slovenia
- Non-returning countries: Yugoslavia
- Participation map: Finalist countries Countries eliminated in Kvalifikacija za Millstreet Countries that participated in the past but not in 1993

Vote
- Voting system: Each country awarded 12, 10, 8–1 point(s) to their 10 favourite songs
- Winning song: Ireland "In Your Eyes"

The Eurovision Song Contest 1993 was the 38th edition of the Eurovision Song Contest, held on 15 May 1993 at the Green Glens Arena in Millstreet, Ireland, and presented by Fionnuala Sweeney. It was organised by the European Broadcasting Union (EBU) and host broadcaster Radio Telefís Éireann (RTÉ), who staged the event after winning the 1992 contest for Ireland with the song "Why Me?" performed by Linda Martin.

Broadcasters from twenty-five countries participated in the contest, the largest yet held. Twenty-two of the twenty-three countries that had participated in the previous year's event returned, with Yugoslavia prevented from competing following the closure of its national broadcaster and the placement of sanctions against the country in response to the Yugoslav Wars. In response to an increased interest in participation of broadcasters from the former Eastern Bloc countries following the collapse of communist regimes, three spaces in the event were allocated to first-time participants, which would be determined through a qualifying competition. Held in April 1993 in Ljubljana, Slovenia, Kvalifikacija za Millstreet featured entries from seven countries and resulted in the entries from the former Yugoslav republics of Bosnia and Herzegovina, Croatia, and Slovenia progressing to the contest in Millstreet.

For the second year in a row, the winner was Ireland with the song "In Your Eyes", written by Jimmy Walsh and performed by Niamh Kavanagh. The United Kingdom, Switzerland, France, and Norway completed the top five, with the United Kingdom achieving its second consecutive runner-up placing. Ireland achieved its fifth victory in the contest, matching the overall record held by France and Luxembourg, and joined Israel, Luxembourg and Spain as countries with wins in successive contests.

== Location ==
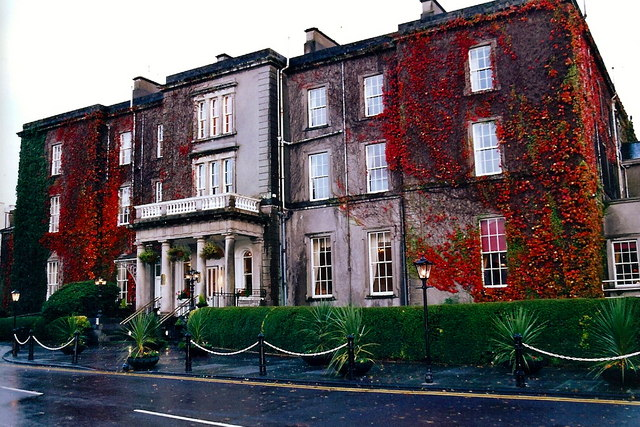
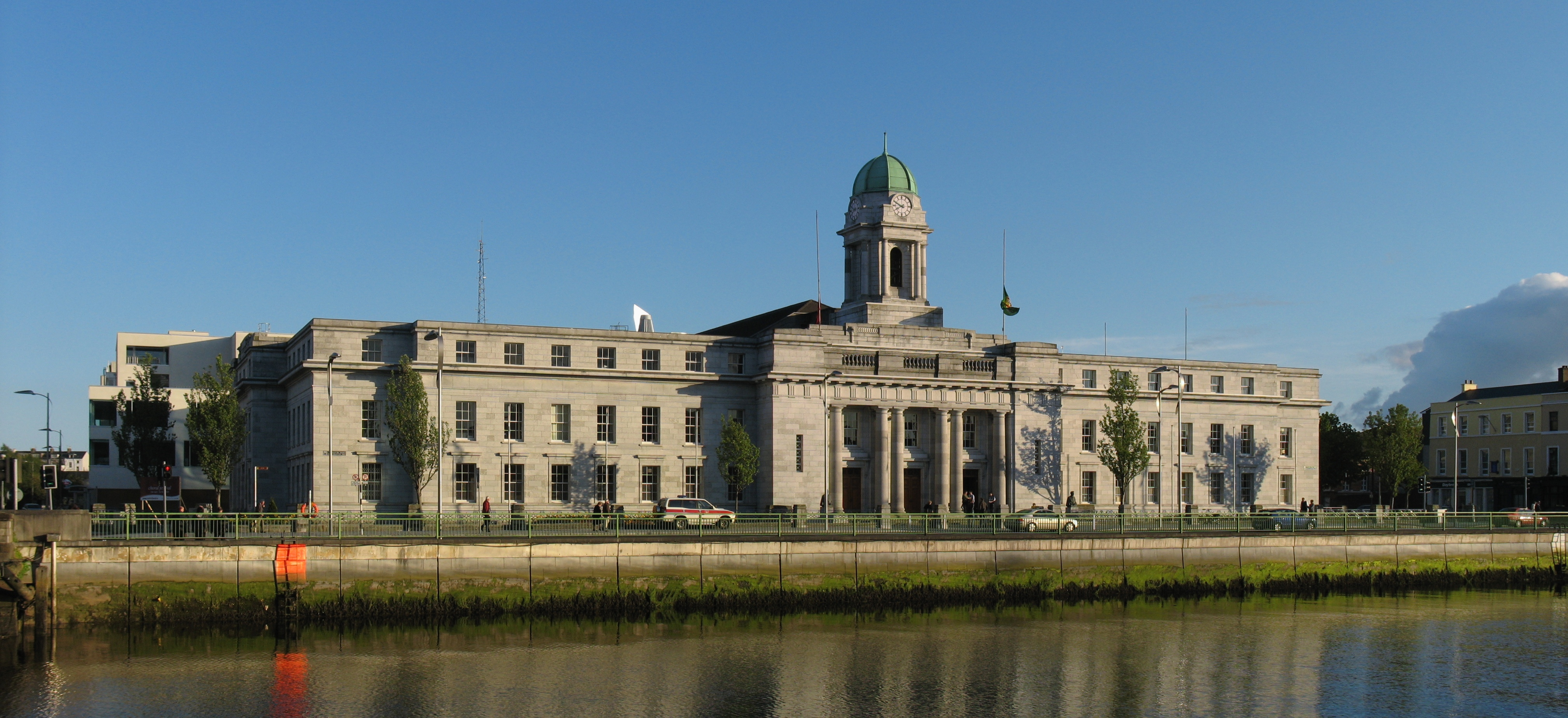
The Great Southern Hotel in Killarney (top) and Cork's City Hall (bottom) hosted receptions for the participating delegations during the week of the contest.
Location of host town Millstreet (in blue) and other towns and cities which held events during the contest week (in green); County Cork is highlighted

The 1993 contest took place in Millstreet, Ireland, following the country's victory at the 1992 edition with the song "Why Me?", performed by Linda Martin. It was the fourth time that Ireland had hosted the contest, having previously staged the event in 1971, 1981, and 1988, with all previous events held in the country's capital city Dublin.

The Green Glens Arena, an indoor arena used primarily for equestrian events, was chosen as the contest venue, with its owner Noel C Duggan offering the use of the venue for free, as well as pledging a further £200,000 from local businesses for the staging of the event. Individuals within Radio Telefís Éireann (RTÉ), including the organisation's Director-General Joe Barry, were interested in staging the event outside of Dublin for the first time, and alongside Dublin RTÉ production teams scouted locations in rural Ireland in the months following Ireland's win. Although the contest had previously been held in smaller towns, such as Harrogate, an English town of 70,000 people which staged the 1982 contest, with a population of 1,500, Millstreet became the smallest settlement to stage the event at that time and continues to hold the record as of 2026. The arena would have an audience of around 3,500 during the contest. The choice of Millstreet and the Green Glens Arena to stage the contest was met with some ridicule, with BBC journalist Nicholas Witchell referring to the venue as a "cowshed", however Millstreet had won out over more conventional locations, including Dublin and Galway, due to the facilities available in the Green Glens Arena and the town's local community which were hugely enthusiastic about the event being staged in their area.

Due to the small size of Millstreet, delegations were primarily based in surrounding settlements, including Killarney and other towns in counties Cork and Kerry. Alongside Millstreet itself, Killarney and Cork City held receptions for the competing delegates during the week of the contest, at the Great Southern Hotel in Killarney and Cork's City Hall, the latter hosted by the Minister for Arts, Culture and the Gaeltacht.

== Participants ==
Eurovision Song Contest 1993 – Participation summaries by country
- Austria; Belgium; Bosnia and Herzegovina; Croatia; Cyprus; Denmark; Estonia; Finland; France; Germany; Greece; Hungary; Iceland; Ireland; Israel; Italy; Luxembourg; Malta; Netherlands; Norway; Portugal; Romania; Slovakia; Slovenia; Spain; Sweden; Switzerland; Turkey; United Kingdom
- Countries in italics failed to progress from Kvalifikacija za Millstreet

In the late 1980s and early 1990s, the Eurovision Song Contest regularly featured over twenty participants in each edition, and by 1992 an increasing number of broadcasters had begun expressing an interest in joining the event for the first time. This came as a result of revolutions leading to the fall of communist regimes in Europe and the formation of new countries due to the collapse of the Soviet Union and Yugoslavia. With the admission into the European Broadcasting Union (EBU) of the broadcasters of the countries that emerged from the breakup of Yugoslavia, and the merger of the EBU with its Eastern European counterpart, the International Radio and Television Organisation (OIRT), the number of broadcasters eligible to participate in the contest increased significantly. In an effort to incorporate these new countries into the contest, the EBU raised the maximum number of participants to twenty-five – the highest number yet seen in the contest – creating space for three new countries to participate alongside twenty-two of the twenty-three countries that had participated in the 1992 contest. Yugoslavia – which had participated in the contest since 1961 (Note: Yugoslavia's participants had represented the Socialist Federal Republic of Yugoslavia between 1961 and 1991 and the Federal Republic of Yugoslavia in 1992.) – was unable to participate as its EBU member broadcaster Jugoslovenska radio-televizija (JRT) was disbanded in 1992 and its successor organisations Radio-televizija Srbije (RTS) and Radio-televizija Crne Gore (RTCG) were barred from joining the EBU due to sanctions against the country as part of the Yugoslav Wars.

As a temporary solution for the 1993 contest, a qualifying round was organised to determine the three countries which participate in the final for the first time. Subsequently, for the 1994 contest, a relegation system was introduced which would bar the lowest-scoring countries from participating in the following year's event. At the running order draw, held in December 1992 at the National Concert Hall in Dublin and hosted by Pat Kenny and Linda Martin, the three new countries were represented as Countries A, B, and C, corresponding with the countries that would place first, second and third in the qualifying competition respectively. Entitled Kvalifikacija za Millstreet, the qualifying round took place on 3 April 1993 in Ljubljana, Slovenia. Initially broadcasters in as many as fourteen countries registered an interest in competing in the event, however only seven of them eventually submitted entries, representing Bosnia and Herzegovina, Croatia, Estonia, Hungary, Romania, Slovakia, and Slovenia. Ultimately the entries from Bosnia and Herzegovina, Croatia, and Slovenia were chosen to progress to the contest proper in Millstreet; as constituent republics of SFR Yugoslavia, representatives from all three countries had previously competed in the contest.

A number of artists who had previously participated in the contest were featured among the performers at this event for the same country, either as the main performing artist or as backing performers: Tony Wegas had represented Austria in 1992, and among his backing performers was Gary Lux, who had previously represented Austria in the contest on three occasions, as a member of the group Westend in 1983 and as a solo artist in 1985 and 1987; Katri Helena had previously competed for Finland in 1979; Tommy Seebach, representing Denmark as part of the Seebach Band, had represented Denmark in 1979 as a solo artist and in 1981 alongside Debbie Cameron; and Humphrey Campbell, who had represented the Netherlands in 1992, returned as a backing singer for the Dutch entrant Ruth Jacott.

Eurovision Song Contest 1993 participants
Country	Broadcaster	Artist	Song	Language	Songwriter(s)	Conductor
Austria	ORF	Tony Wegas	"Maria Magdalena"	German	Johann Bertl; Christian Kolonovits; Thomas Spitzer	Christian Kolonovits
Belgium	BRTN	Barbara	"Iemand als jij"	Dutch	Tobana; Marc Vliegen	Bert Candries
Bosnia and Herzegovina	RTVBiH	Fazla	"Sva bol svijeta"	Bosnian	Dino Dervišhalidović; Fahrudin Pecikoza	Noel Kelehan (Note: The nominated conductor for Bosnia and Herzegovina, Sinan Alimanović, was unable to safely commute to the flight to Ireland due to the ongoing Bosnian War; the contest's musical director, Noel Kelehan, subsequently led the orchestra during the Bosnian entry.)
Croatia	HRT	Put	"Don't Ever Cry"	Croatian, English	Andrej Baša; Đorđe Novković	Andrej Baša
Cyprus	CyBC	Zymboulakis and Van Beke	"Mi stamatas" (Μη σταματάς)	Greek	Aristos Moschovakis; Rodoula Papalambrianou	George Theofanous
Denmark	DR	Seebach Band	"Under stjernerne på himlen"	Danish	Keld Heick; Tommy Seebach	George Keller
Finland	YLE	Katri Helena	"Tule luo"	Finnish	Matti Puurtinen; Jukka Saarinen	Olli Ahvenlahti
France	France Télévision	Patrick Fiori	"Mama Corsica"	French, Corsican	François Valéry	Christian Cravero
Germany	MDR (Note: On behalf of the German public broadcasting consortium ARD)	Münchener Freiheit	"Viel zu weit"	German	Stefan Zauner	Norbert Daum
Greece	ERT	Katerina Garbi	"Ellada, hora tou fotos" (Ελλάδα, χώρα του φωτός)	Greek	Dimosthenis Stringlis	Haris Andreadis
Iceland	RÚV	Inga	"Þá veistu svarið"	Icelandic	Friðrik Sturluson; Jon Kjell Seljeseth	Jon Kjell Seljeseth
Ireland	RTÉ	Niamh Kavanagh	"In Your Eyes"	English	Jimmy Walsh	Noel Kelehan
Israel	IBA	Lehakat Shiru	"Shiru" (שירו)	Hebrew, English	David Chris; Shaike Paikov; Yoram Taharlev	Amir Frohlich
Italy	RAI	Enrico Ruggeri	"Sole d'Europa"	Italian	Enrico Ruggeri	Vittorio Cosma
Luxembourg	CLT	Modern Times	"Donne-moi une chance"	French, Luxembourgish	Patrick Hippert; Jimmy Martin	Francis Goya
Malta	PBS	William Mangion	"This Time"	English	William Mangion	Joseph Sammut
Netherlands	NOS	Ruth Jacott	"Vrede"	Dutch	Jochem Fluitsma; Eric van Tijn; Henk Westbroek	Harry van Hoof
Norway	NRK	Silje Vige	"Alle mine tankar"	Norwegian	Bjørn Erik Vige	Rolf Løvland
Portugal	RTP	Anabela	"A cidade até ser dia"	Portuguese	Pedro Abrantes; Paulo da Costa; Marco Quelhas	Armindo Neves
Slovenia	RTVSLO	1X Band	"Tih deževen dan"	Slovene	Tomaž Kosec; Cole Moretti	Jože Privšek
Spain	TVE	Eva Santamaría	"Hombres"	Spanish	Carlos Toro	Eduardo Leiva
Sweden	SVT	Arvingarna	"Eloise"	Swedish	Lasse Holm; Gert Lengstrand	Curt-Eric Holmquist
Switzerland	SRG SSR	Annie Cotton	"Moi, tout simplement"	French	Christophe Duc; Jean-Jacques Egli	Marc Sorrentino
Turkey	TRT	Burak Aydos, Öztürk Baybora and Serter	"Esmer Yarim"	Turkish	Burak Aydos	No conductor
United Kingdom	BBC	Sonia	"Better the Devil You Know"	English	Dean Collinson; Red	Nigel Wright

Entires which failed to progress from Kvalifikacija za Millstreet
Country	Broadcaster	Artist	Song	Language	Songwriter(s)
Estonia	ETV	Janika Sillamaa	"Muretut meelt ja südametuld"	Estonian	Leelo Tungal; Andres Valkonen
Hungary	MTV	Andrea Szulák	"Árva reggel"	Hungarian	Emese Hatvani; György Jakab; László Pásztor
Romania	TVR	Dida Drăgan	"Nu pleca"	Romanian	Dida Drăgan; Adrian Ordean
Slovakia	STV	Elán	"Amnestia na neveru"	Slovak	Ján Baláž; Boris Filan; Jozef Ráž

== Production and format ==
The Eurovision Song Contest 1993 was produced by the Irish public broadcaster Radio Telefís Éireann (RTÉ). Liam Miller served as executive producer, Kevin Linehan served as producer, Anita Notaro served as director, Alan Farquharson served as designer, and Noel Kelehan served as musical director, leading the RTÉ Concert Orchestra. A separate musical director could be appointed by each participating broadcaster to lead the orchestra during the performance of its country's entry, with the host musical director also available to conduct for those which did not nominate their own conductor. On behalf of the EBU, the event was overseen by Christian Clausen as scrutineer.

Each participating broadcaster submitted one song, which was required to be no longer than three minutes in duration and performed in the language, or one of the languages, of the country which it represented. A maximum of six performers were allowed on stage during each country's performance, and all participants were required to have reached the age of 16 in the year of the contest. Each entry could utilise all or part of the live orchestra and could use instrumental-only backing tracks; however any backing tracks used could only include the sound of instruments featured on stage being mimed by the performers.

The results of the 1993 contest were determined through the same scoring system as had first been introduced in 1975: each country awarded twelve points to its favourite entry, followed by ten points to its second favourite, and then awarded points in decreasing value from eight to one for the remaining songs which featured in the country's top ten, with countries unable to vote for their own entry. The points awarded by each country were determined by a jury assembled by each participating broadcaster of sixteen individuals, which was required to be split evenly between members of the public and music professionals, between men and women, and by age. Each jury member voted in secret and awarded between one and ten votes to each participating song, excluding that from their own country and with no abstentions permitted. The votes of each member were collected following the country's performance and then tallied by the non-voting jury chairperson to determine the points to be awarded. In any cases where two or more songs in the top ten received the same number of votes, a show of hands by all jury members was used to determine the final placing.

The 1993 contest was at the time the largest outside broadcast production ever undertaken by RTÉ, and the broadcaster was reported to have spent over £2,200,000 on producing the event. In order to stage the event Millstreet and the Green Glens Arena underwent major infrastructure improvements, which were led by local groups and individuals. The floor area within the arena had to be dug out in order to create additional height to facilitate the stage and equipment, extra phone lines had to be installed, and the town's railway line and station required an extension at an extra cost of over £1,000,000.

The stage design for the Millstreet contest featured the largest stage yet constructed for the event, covering 2,500ft^{2} (232m^{2}) of translucent material which was illuminated from below by lighting strips. A mirror image of the triangular shaped stage was suspended from above, and a slanted background created a distorted perspective for the viewer. A hidden doorway featured in the centre of the stage, which was used by the presenter at the beginning of the show, and by the winning artist as they re-entered the arena following the broadcast. The contest logo, which was publicly presented in February 1993, was designed by Conor Cassidy and was adapted from aspects of the coat of arms of County Cork.

Rehearsals for the participating artists began on 10 May 1993. Two technical rehearsals were conducted for each participating delegation in the week approaching the contest, with countries rehearsing in the order in which they would perform. The first rehearsals were held on 10 and 11 May, consisting of a 15-minute stage-call for the setting up of the stage with instruments and equipment and to brief the orchestra, followed by a 25-minute rehearsal, with the second rehearsals held on 12 and 13 May comprising a 10-minute stage call and 20-minute rehearsal. Following each first rehearsal, there was an opportunity for delegates to review their country's rehearsals on video monitors, as well as to take part in a 25-minute press conference. Three dress rehearsals were held with all artists, two held in the afternoon and evening of 14 May and one final rehearsal in the afternoon of 15 May. An audience was present for the second dress rehearsal on the evening of 14 May, which was highly attended by the local population of Millstreet.

== Contest overview ==
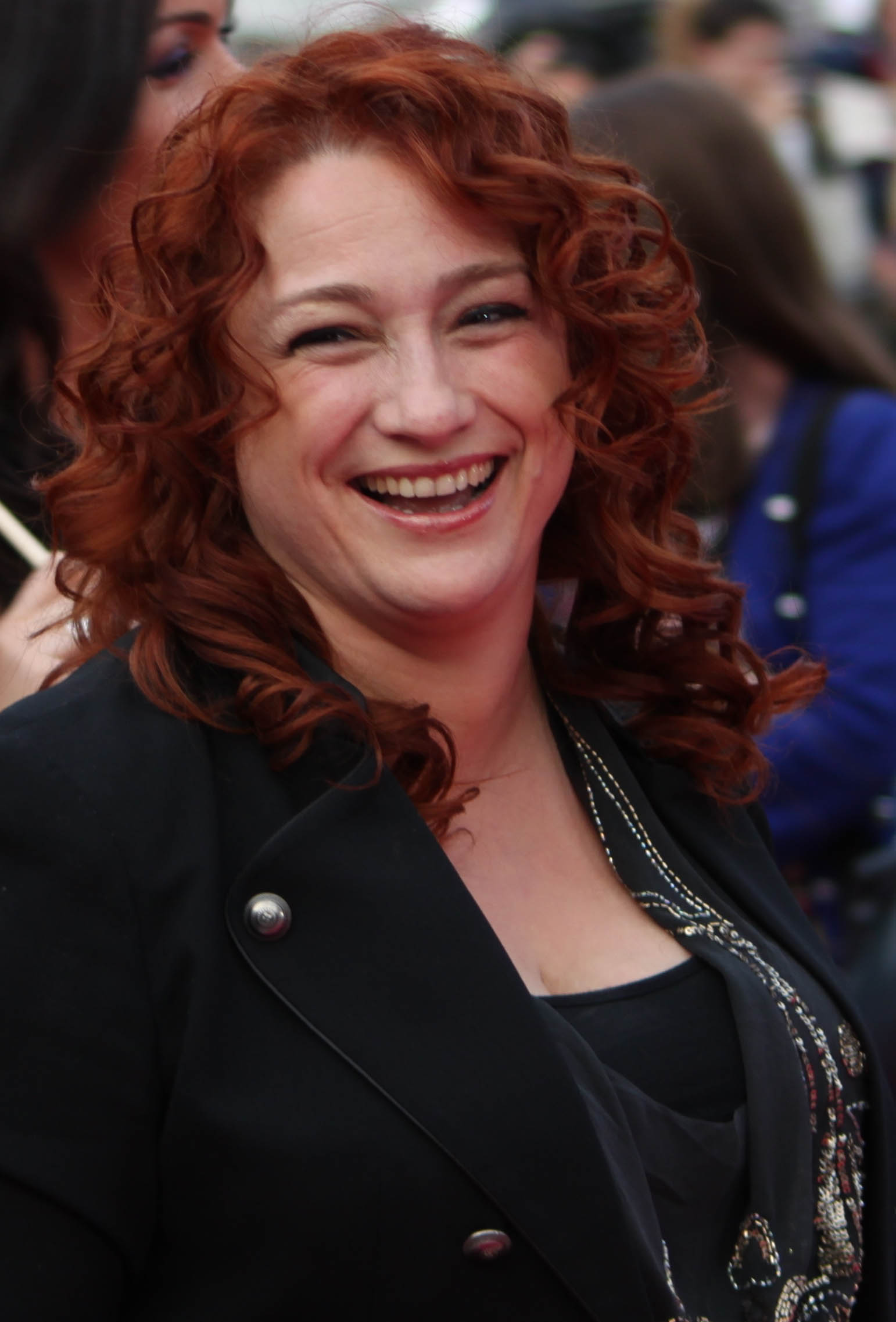
Niamh Kavanagh (pictured in 2010), won the 1993 contest.

The contest took place on 15 May 1993 at 20:00 (IST) and lasted 3 hours and 1 minute. The show was presented by the Irish journalist Fionnuala Sweeney.

The contest was opened by an animated sequence designed by Gary Keenan and inspired by Celtic mythology, set to Irish traditional music by composers Ronan Johnston and Shea Fitzgerald and featuring uilleann pipes player Davy Spillane. The interval act comprised performances by previous Eurovision winners Linda Martin, reprising her winning song from the previous year's contest "Why Me?", and Johnny Logan, performing the song "Voices (Are Calling)" with choirs from the Cork School of Music and local children of Millstreet. The trophy awarded to the winners was crafted by Waterford Crystal and was presented by Linda Martin.

The winner was Ireland represented by the song "In Your Eyes", written by Jimmy Walsh and performed by Niamh Kavanagh. This marked Ireland's fifth contest win, putting them level with Luxembourg and France for the country with the most wins, and its second win in a row, matching the same feat previously achieved by Spain (1968 and 1969), Luxembourg (1972 and 1973) and Israel (1978 and 1979). The United Kingdom finished in second place for the second year in a row, and for a record-extending fourteenth time overall.

Results of the Eurovision Song Contest 1993
R/O	Country	Artist	Song	Points	Place
1	Italy	Enrico Ruggeri	"Sole d'Europa"	45	12
2	Turkey	Burak Aydos, Öztürk Baybora and Serter	"Esmer Yarim"	10	21
3	Germany	Münchener Freiheit	"Viel zu weit"	18	18
4	Switzerland	Annie Cotton	"Moi, tout simplement"	148	3
5	Denmark	Seebach Band	"Under stjernerne på himlen"	9	22
6	Greece	Katerina Garbi	"Ellada, hora tou fotos"	64	9
7	Belgium	Barbara	"Iemand als jij"	3	25
8	Malta	William Mangion	"This Time"	69	8
9	Iceland	Inga	"Þá veistu svarið"	42	13
10	Austria	Tony Wegas	"Maria Magdalena"	32	14
11	Portugal	Anabela	"A cidade até ser dia"	60	10
12	France	Patrick Fiori	"Mama Corsica"	121	4
13	Sweden	Arvingarna	"Eloise"	89	7
14	Ireland	Niamh Kavanagh	"In Your Eyes"	187	1
15	Luxembourg	Modern Times	"Donne-moi une chance"	11	20
16	Slovenia	1X Band	"Tih deževen dan"	9	22
17	Finland	Katri Helena	"Tule luo"	20	17
18	Bosnia and Herzegovina	Fazla	"Sva bol svijeta"	27	16
19	United Kingdom	Sonia	"Better the Devil You Know"	164	2
20	Netherlands	Ruth Jacott	"Vrede"	92	6
21	Croatia	Put	"Don't Ever Cry"	31	15
22	Spain	Eva Santamaría	"Hombres"	58	11
23	Cyprus	Zymboulakis and Van Beke	"Mi stamatas"	17	19
24	Israel	Lehakat Shiru	"Shiru"	4	24
25	Norway	Silje Vige	"Alle mine tankar"	120	5

=== Spokespersons ===
Each participating broadcaster appointed a spokesperson, connected to the contest venue via telephone lines and responsible for announcing, in English or French, the votes for its respective country. Known spokespersons at the 1993 contest are listed below.

- Finland – Solveig Herlin
- France – Olivier Minne
- Ireland – Eileen Dunne
- Luxembourg – Maurice Molitor
- Malta – Kevin Drake
- Netherlands – Joop van Os
- Sweden – Gösta Hanson
- Turkey – Ömer Önder
- United Kingdom – Colin Berry

== Detailed voting results ==
Jury voting was used to determine the points awarded by all countries. The announcement of the results from each country was conducted in the order in which they performed, with the spokespersons announcing their country's points in English or French in ascending order. However, due to a technical problem with the telephone connection, Malta, which had been scheduled to be the eighth country to vote, was passed over and instead voted last. The detailed breakdown of the points awarded by each country is listed in the tables below.

Ireland scored a record number of points at the time, with Niamh Kavanagh earning a never seen before number of 187 points - however, that record will be surpassed already the following year, with Ireland scoring 226 points.

Detailed voting results of the Eurovision Song Contest 1993
		Total score	Italy	Turkey	Germany	Switzerland	Denmark	Greece	Belgium	Iceland	Austria	Portugal	France	Sweden	Ireland	Luxembourg	Slovenia	Finland	Bosnia and Herzegovina	United Kingdom	Netherlands	Croatia	Spain	Cyprus	Israel	Norway	Malta
Contestants	Italy	45				1						10	5			10		8			2		2				7
Contestants	Turkey	10								1									2			1	6				
Contestants	Germany	18	8			2	3								4						1						
Contestants	Switzerland	148	10		**12**		10	7	8	4	6	1	**12**	6	7	**12**	8	4		10	8	2	3	6	4	3	5
Contestants	Denmark	9												1		3			5								
Contestants	Greece	64	2	2	2								7					6			5		8	**12**	7	7	6
Contestants	Belgium	3			3																						
Contestants	Malta	69	7	5	4	7	5	5			4	2	2	4	2				4	6		4	4	1	3		
Contestants	Iceland	42					4	4			1			7	1		5			2	7	5		2	2	2	
Contestants	Austria	32		4				1	3				3		6				**12**	3							
Contestants	Portugal	60			1		1	2		2	5		8	2		4		2		1	**12**		**12**	3		5	
Contestants	France	121		7		4	**12**	3		8	7	**12**		8	10	6	4	1		4	3	8		10	8	6	
Contestants	Sweden	89			8	8	7		10	7	10	4				5	6	7		7					10		
Contestants	Ireland	**187**	**12**	1	5	**12**	6	6	2	3	8	6	10	**12**		7	**12**	3	8	**12**	10	6	10	7	5	**12**	**12**
Contestants	Luxembourg	11															1										10
Contestants	Slovenia	9	4											3					1								1
Contestants	Finland	20		3				8		5						2											2
Contestants	Bosnia and Herzegovina	27	3	**12**					1				4		3												4
Contestants	United Kingdom	164	1	8	6	5	8		**12**	**12**	**12**	7	6	10	8	8	10	5	3		4	10	5	4	**12**	8	
Contestants	Netherlands	92	6	6	7				7	6	3			5	**12**		7		10			3	7			10	3
Contestants	Croatia	31				3			4			5								8			1		6	4	
Contestants	Spain	58	5			6			5		2						2	10	6			7		5	1	1	8
Contestants	Cyprus	17					2	10												5							
Contestants	Israel	4										3	1														
Contestants	Norway	120		10	10	10		**12**	6	10		8			5	1	3	**12**	7		6	**12**		8			

=== 12 points ===
The below table summarises how the maximum 12 points were awarded from one country to another. The winning country is shown in bold. Ireland received the maximum score of 12 points from seven of the voting countries, with the United Kingdom receiving four sets of 12 points, Norway and Switzerland receiving three sets of maximum scores each, France and Portugal two sets each, and Austria, Bosnia and Herzegovina, Greece and the Netherlands each receiving one maximum score.

Distribution of 12 points awarded at the Eurovision Song Contest 1993
N.	Contestant	Nation(s) giving 12 points
7	**Ireland**	Italy, Malta, Norway, Slovenia, Sweden, Switzerland, United Kingdom
4	United Kingdom	Austria, Belgium, Iceland, Israel
3	Norway	Croatia, Finland, Greece
3	Switzerland	France, Germany, Luxembourg
2	France	Denmark, Portugal
2	Portugal	Netherlands, Spain
1	Austria	Bosnia and Herzegovina
1	Bosnia and Herzegovina	Turkey
1	Greece	Cyprus
1	Netherlands	Ireland

== Broadcasts ==
Each participating broadcaster was required to relay the contest via its networks. Non-participating EBU member broadcasters were also able to relay the contest as "passive participants". Broadcasters were able to send commentators to provide coverage of the contest in their own native language and to relay information about the artists and songs to their television viewers. These commentators were typically sent to the venue to report on the event, and were able to provide commentary from small booths constructed at the back of the venue. The contest reportedly received an estimated global audience of 300 to 500 million television viewers. Known details on the broadcasts in each country, including the specific broadcasting stations and commentators are shown in the tables below.

Broadcasters and commentators in participating countries
Country	Broadcaster	Channel(s)	Commentator(s)	Ref.
Austria	ORF	ORF 1	Ernst Grissemann	
Belgium	BRTN	TV1	André Vermeulen	
Belgium	RTBF	RTBF1, Sports 21	Claude Delacroix	
Croatia	HRT	HTV 1	Aleksandar Kostadinov	
Cyprus	CyBC	RIK 1	Evi Papamichail	
Cyprus	Radio Frederik			
Denmark	DR	DR TV	Jørgen de Mylius	
Denmark	DR	DR P3	Jens Michael Nielsen	
Finland	YLE	TV1	Erkki Pohjanheimo and Kirsi-Maria Niemi	
Finland	YLE	Radiomafia	Sanna Kojo and Outi Popp	
Finland	YLE	Riksradion	Johan Finne, Paul Olin and Wille Wilenius	
France	France Télévision	France 2	Patrice Laffont	
Germany	ARD	Erstes Deutsches Fernsehen	Jan Hofer	
Germany	BR	Bayern 1		
Germany	SSVC	SSVC Television		
Greece	ERT	ET1		
Iceland	RÚV	Sjónvarpið	Jakob Frímann Magnússon	
Ireland	RTÉ	RTÉ 1	Pat Kenny	
Ireland	RTÉ	RTÉ Radio 1	Larry Gogan	
Israel	IBA	Israeli Television		
Italy	RAI	RAI Uno (Note: Deferred broadcast at 23:05 (CEST))	Ettore Andenna	
Luxembourg	CLT	RTL Hei Elei	Romain Goerend	
Malta	PBS	TVM		
Netherlands	NOS	Nederland 3	Willem van Beusekom	
Norway	NRK	NRK Fjernsynet, NRK P2	Leif Erik Forberg	
Portugal	RTP	RTP Canal 1 (Note: Additional deferred broadcast on RTP Internacional at 22:45 (CEST))		
Slovenia	RTVSLO	SLO 1	Tajda Lekše	
Slovenia	RTVSLO	Val 202		
Spain	TVE	La Primera	José Luis Uribarri	
Sweden	SVT	TV2	Jan Jingryd	
Sweden	SR	SR P3	Claes-Johan Larsson and Susan Seidemar	
Switzerland	SRG SSR	SF DRS	Bernard Thurnheer	
Switzerland	SRG SSR	TSR Chaîne nationale	Jean-Marc Richard	
Switzerland	SRG SSR	TSI Canale nazionale	Emanuela Gaggini	
Turkey	TRT	TRT 1	Bülend Özveren	
United Kingdom	BBC	BBC1 (Note: Additional live broadcast on BBC World Service Television)	Terry Wogan	
United Kingdom	BBC	BBC Radio 2	Ken Bruce	

Broadcasters and commentators in non-participating countries
Country	Broadcaster	Channel(s)	Commentator(s)	Ref.
Australia	SBS	SBS TV (Note: Deferred broadcast the following day at 20:30 (AEST))		
Estonia	ETV			
Estonia	STV	STV1		
Falkland Islands	SSVC	SSVC Television (Note: Delayed broadcast on 29 May at 21:00 (FKST))		
Faroe Islands	SvF			
Greenland	KNR	KNR (Note: Deferred broadcast at 22:10 (WGST))		
Hungary	MTV	MTV1	István Vágó	
Poland	TVP	TVP1	Artur Orzech and Maria Szabłowska	
Romania	TVR	TVR 1		
Russia	RTR	RTR (Note: Deferred broadcast at 23:30 (MSD); also broadcast deferred via the Orbita satellite broadcasting system in the Russian Far East)		
Slovakia	STV	STV2 (Note: Deferred broadcast the following day at 21:35 (CEST))		
Yugoslavia	RTS	RTS B2 (Note: Delayed broadcast in a shortened format on 28 May 1993 at 23:30 (CEST))		

== Notes and references ==
=== Bibliography ===
- Knox, David Blake (2015). Ireland and the Eurovision: The Winners, the Losers and the Turkey. Stillorgan, Dublin, Ireland: New Island Books. ISBN 978-1-84840-429-8.
- Murtomäki, Asko (2007). Finland 12 points! Suomen Euroviisut (in Finnish). Helsinki, Finland: Teos. ISBN 951-851-106-3.
- O'Connor, John Kennedy (2010). The Eurovision Song Contest: The Official History (2nd ed.). London, United Kingdom: Carlton Books. ISBN 978-1-84732-521-1.
- Roxburgh, Gordon (2020). Songs for Europe: The United Kingdom at the Eurovision Song Contest. Vol. Four: The 1990s. Prestatyn, United Kingdom: Telos Publishing. ISBN 978-1-84583-163-9.
- Thorsson, Leif; Verhage, Martin (2006). Melodifestivalen genom tiderna : de svenska uttagningarna och internationella finalerna [Melodifestivalen through the ages: the Swedish selections and international finals] (in Swedish). Stockholm, Sweden: Premium Publishing. ISBN 91-89136-29-2.
