= List of number-one albums from the 2010s (Denmark) =

The Danish Albums Chart is a list of albums ranked by physical and digital sales in Denmark. It is compiled by Nielsen Music Control in association with the Danish branch of the International Federation of the Phonographic Industry (IFPI), and the new number-one album is announced every Thursday at midnight on the official Danish music charts website.

The following are the albums which reached number one in Denmark during the 2010s.

== 2010 ==
Date	Artist	Album
1 January 2010	Rasmus Seebach	Rasmus Seebach
8 January 2010	Rasmus Seebach	Rasmus Seebach
15 January 2010	Rasmus Seebach	Rasmus Seebach
22 January 2010	Rasmus Seebach	Rasmus Seebach
29 January 2010	Rasmus Seebach	Rasmus Seebach
5 February 2010	Rasmus Seebach	Rasmus Seebach
12 February 2010	Kashmir	Trespassers
19 February 2010	Various Artists	Dansk Melodi Grand Prix 2010
26 February 2010	Rasmus Seebach	Rasmus Seebach
5 March 2010	Rasmus Seebach	Rasmus Seebach
12 March 2010	Rasmus Seebach	Rasmus Seebach
19 March 2010	Gorillaz	Plastic Beach
26 March 2010	Rasmus Seebach	Rasmus Seebach
2 April 2010	Rasmus Seebach	Rasmus Seebach
9 April 2010	Hansi Hinterseer	The Danish Collection
16 April 2010	Hansi Hinterseer	The Danish Collection
23 April 2010	Hansi Hinterseer	The Danish Collection
30 April 2010	Hansi Hinterseer	The Danish Collection
7 May 2010	Rasmus Seebach	Rasmus Seebach
14 May 2010	Kim Larsen	Mine damer og herrer
21 May 2010	Kim Larsen	Mine damer og herrer
28 May 2010	Kim Larsen	Mine damer og herrer
4 June 2010	Kim Larsen	Mine damer og herrer
11 June 2010	Kim Larsen	Mine damer og herrer
18 June 2010	Kim Larsen	Mine damer og herrer
25 June 2010	Kim Larsen	Mine damer og herrer
2 July 2010	Eminem	Recovery
9 July 2010	Rasmus Seebach	Rasmus Seebach
16 July 2010	Rasmus Seebach	Rasmus Seebach
23 July 2010	Rasmus Seebach	Rasmus Seebach
30 July 2010	Rasmus Seebach	Rasmus Seebach
6 August 2010	Rasmus Seebach	Rasmus Seebach
13 August 2010	Rasmus Seebach	Rasmus Seebach
20 August 2010	Rasmus Seebach	Rasmus Seebach
27 August 2010	Iron Maiden	The Final Frontier
3 September 2010	Hansi Hinterseer	Ich hab Dich einfach lieb
10 September 2010	Rasmus Seebach	Rasmus Seebach
17 September 2010	Robyn	Body Talk Pt. 2
24 September 2010	Volbeat	Beyond Hell/Above Heaven
1 October 2010	Volbeat	Beyond Hell/Above Heaven
8 October 2010	Tina Dickow	Welcome Back Colour
15 October 2010	Tina Dickow	Welcome Back Colour
22 October 2010	De eneste to	De eneste to
29 October 2010	Søren Huss	Troen & ingen
5 November 2010	De eneste to	De eneste to
12 November 2010	Thomas Helmig	Past Forward
19 November 2010	Thomas Helmig	Past Forward
26 November 2010	Take That	Progress
3 December 2010	Tina Dickow	Welcome Back Colour
10 December 2010	Tina Dickow	Welcome Back Colour
17 December 2010	Take That	Progress
24 December 2010	Thomas Helmig	Past Forward
31 December 2010	Take That	Progress

== 2011 ==
Date	Artist	Album
7 January 2011	Agnes Obel	Philharmonics
14 January 2011	Agnes Obel	Philharmonics
21 January 2011	Agnes Obel	Philharmonics
28 January 2011	Agnes Obel	Philharmonics
4 February 2011	Agnes Obel	Philharmonics
11 February 2011	Agnes Obel	Philharmonics
18 February 2011	Agnes Obel	Philharmonics
25 February 2011	TV-2	Showtime
4 March 2011	TV-2	Showtime
11 March 2011	Various Artists	MGP 2011
18 March 2011	Various Artists	MGP 2011
25 March 2011	L.O.C.	Livertiner
1 April 2011	Various Artists	MGP 2011
8 April 2011	Various Artists	MGP 2011
15 April 2011	Various Artists	MGP 2011
22 April 2011	Kato	Discolized 2.0
29 April 2011	Kato	Discolized 2.0
6 May 2011	Nik & Jay	Engle eller dæmoner
13 May 2011	Nik & Jay	Engle eller dæmoner
20 May 2011	Nik & Jay	Engle eller dæmoner
27 May 2011	Nik & Jay	Engle eller dæmoner
3 June 2011	Lady Gaga	Born This Way
10 June 2011	Nik & Jay	Engle eller dæmoner
17 June 2011	Adele	21
24 June 2011	Adele	21
1 July 2011	Bon Iver	Bon Iver, Bon Iver
8 July 2011	Adele	21
15 July 2011	Adele	21
22 July 2011	Take That	Progressed
29 July 2011	Adele	21
5 August 2011	Adele	21
12 August 2011	Adele	21
19 August 2011	Sarah	Hjerteskud
26 August 2011	Adele	21
2 September 2011	Adele	21
9 September 2011	Red Hot Chili Peppers	I'm with You
16 September 2011	I Got You On Tape	Church of the Real
23 September 2011	Suspekt	Elektra
30 September 2011	Malk de Koijn	Toback to the Fromtime
7 October 2011	Kandis	Kandis 14
14 October 2011	Various Artists	Toppen af Poppen 2
21 October 2011	Various Artists	Toppen af Poppen 2
28 October 2011	Rasmus Seebach	Mer' end kærlighed
4 November 2011	Rasmus Seebach	Mer' end kærlighed
11 November 2011	Rasmus Seebach	Mer' end kærlighed
18 November 2011	Rasmus Seebach	Mer' end kærlighed
25 November 2011	Rasmus Seebach	Mer' end kærlighed
2 December 2011	Rasmus Seebach	Mer' end kærlighed
9 December 2011	Rasmus Seebach	Mer' end kærlighed
16 December 2011	Rasmus Seebach	Mer' end kærlighed
23 December 2011	Rasmus Seebach	Mer' end kærlighed
30 December 2011	Rasmus Seebach	Mer' end kærlighed

== 2012 ==
Date	Artist	Album
6 January 2012	Adele	21
13 January 2012	Rasmus Seebach	Mer' end kærlighed
20 January 2012	Adele	21
27 January 2012	Rasmus Seebach	Mer' end kærlighed
3 February 2012	Various Artists	MGP 2012
10 February 2012	Various Artists	MGP 2012
17 February 2012	Various Artists	MGP 2012
24 February 2012	Various Artists	MGP 2012
2 March 2012	Various Artists	MGP 2012
9 March 2012	Various Artists	MGP 2012
16 March 2012	Bruce Springsteen	Wrecking Ball
23 March 2012	Bruce Springsteen	Wrecking Ball
30 March 2012	Bruce Springsteen	Wrecking Ball
6 April 2012	Lukas Graham	Lukas Graham
13 April 2012	Lukas Graham	Lukas Graham
20 April 2012	Lukas Graham	Lukas Graham
27 April 2012	Lukas Graham	Lukas Graham
4 May 2012	Lukas Graham	Lukas Graham
11 May 2012	Lukas Graham	Lukas Graham
18 May 2012	Lukas Graham	Lukas Graham
25 May 2012	Lukas Graham	Lukas Graham
1 June 2012	John Mayer	Born and Raised
8 June 2012	Lukas Graham	Lukas Graham
15 June 2012	Lukas Graham	Lukas Graham
22 June 2012	Lukas Graham	Lukas Graham
29 June 2012	Justin Bieber	Believe
6 July 2012	Turboweekend	Fault Lines
13 July 2012	Justin Bieber	Believe
20 July 2012	Justin Bieber	
27 July 2012	Rasmus Seebach	Mer' end kærlighed
3 August 2012	Rasmus Seebach	Mer' end kærlighed
10 August 2012	Rasmus Seebach	Mer' end kærlighed
17 August 2012	Rasmus Seebach	Mer' end kærlighed
24 August 2012	Rasmus Seebach	Mer' end kærlighed
31 August 2012	Rasmus Seebach	Mer' end kærlighed
7 September 2012	DJ Static	Rolig Under Pres
14 September 2012	Tina Dico	Where Do You Go To Disappear?
21 September 2012	Bob Dylan	Tempest
28 September 2012	Orgi-E	Klam Fyr
5 October 2012	Tina Dico	Where Do You Go To Disappear?
12 October 2012	L.O.C.	Prestige, Paranoia, Persona Vol. 2
19 October 2012	L.O.C.	Prestige, Paranoia, Persona Vol. 2
26 October 2012	Søren Huss	Oppefra og ned
2 November 2012	L.O.C.	Prestige, Paranoia, Persona Vol. 2
9 November 2012	Nephew	Hjertestarter
16 November 2012	Nephew	Hjertestarter
23 November 2012	One Direction	Take Me Home
30 November 2012	Kim Larsen	Du Glade Verden
7 December 2012	Kim Larsen	Du Glade Verden
14 December 2012	Kim Larsen	Du Glade Verden
21 December 2012	Kim Larsen	Du Glade Verden
28 December 2012	Kim Larsen	Du Glade Verden

== 2013 ==
Week	Date	Artist	Album
52/ 2012	4 January 2013	Kim Larsen	Du Glade Verden
1/2013	11 January 2013	Lukas Graham	Lukas Graham
2	18 January 2013	Lukas Graham	Lukas Graham
3	25 January 2013	Lukas Graham	Lukas Graham
4	1 February 2013	Lukas Graham	Lukas Graham
5	8 February 2013	Various Artists	M:G:P 2013
6	15 February 2013	Various Artists	M:G:P 2013
7	22 February 2013	Various Artists	M:G:P 2013
8	1 March 2013	Nick Cave and the Bad Seeds	Push the Sky Away
9	8 March 2013	Various Artists	M:G:P 2013
10	15 March 2013	Mads Langer	In These Waters
11	22 March 2013	David Bowie	The Next Day
12	29 March 2013	Kashmir	E.A.R
13	5 April 2013	Depeche Mode	Delta Machine
14	12 April 2013	Mads Langer	In These Waters
15	19 April 2013	Volbeat	Outlaw Gentlemen & Shady Ladies
16	26 April 2013	Volbeat	Outlaw Gentlemen & Shady Ladies
17	3 May 2013	Allan Olsen	Jøwt
18	10 May 2013	Volbeat	Outlaw Gentlemen & Shady Ladies
19	17 May 2013	Allan Olsen	Jøwt
20	24 May 2013	Johnny Hansen	Songs from My Heart
21	31 May 2013	Daft Punk	Random Access Memories
22	7 June 2013	Daft Punk	Random Access Memories
23	14 June 2013	Andrea Berg	My Danish Collection
24	21 June 2013	Black Sabbath	13
25	28 June 2013	Kanye West	Yeezus
26	5 July 2013	Daft Punk	Random Access Memories
27	12 July 2013	Marie Key	De her dage
28	19 July 2013	Marie Key	De her dage
29	26 July 2013	Marie Key	De her dage
30	2 August 2013	Marie Key	De her dage
31	9 August 2013	Marie Key	De her dage
32	16 August 2013	Marie Key	De her dage
33	23 August 2013	Ulige Numre	Nu til dags
34	30 August 2013	John Mayer	Paradise Valley
35	6 September 2013	Marie Key	De her dage
36	13 September 2013	Marie Key	De her dage
37	20 September 2013	Arctic Monkeys	AM
38	27 September 2013	Avicii	True
39	4 October 2013	Drake	Nothing Was the Same
40	11 October 2013	Agnes Obel	Aventine
41	18 October 2013	Burhan G	Din for evigt
42	25 October 2013	Burhan G	Din for evigt
43	1 November 2013	Michael Falch	Sommeren kom ny tilbage
44	8 November 2013	Thomas Helmig	KH Helmig
45	15 November 2013	Rasmus Seebach	Ingen kan love dig i morgen
46	22 November 2013	Rasmus Seebach	Ingen kan love dig i morgen
47	29 November 2013	Rasmus Seebach	Ingen kan love dig i morgen
48	6 December 2013	One Direction	Midnight Memories
49	13 December 2013	Rasmus Seebach	Ingen kan love dig i morgen
50	20 December 2013	Rasmus Seebach	Ingen kan love dig i morgen
51	27 December 2013	Rasmus Seebach	Ingen kan love dig i morgen

== 2014 ==
Week	Date	Artist	Album
52/2013	3 January 2014	Rasmus Seebach	Ingen kan love dig i morgen
1/2014	10 January 2014	Rasmus Seebach	Ingen kan love dig i morgen
2	17 January 2014	Rasmus Seebach	Ingen kan love dig i morgen
3	24 January 2014	Bruce Springsteen	High Hopes
4	31 January 2014	Bruce Springsteen	High Hopes
5	7 February 2014	L.O.C.	Sakrilegium
6	14 January 2014	Rasmus Seebach	Ingen kan love dig i morgen
7	21 January 2014	Rasmus Seebach	Ingen kan love dig i morgen
8	28 January 2014	Rasmus Seebach	Ingen kan love dig i morgen
9	7 March 2014	Poul Krebs	Asfalt
10	14 March 2014	Pharrell Williams	G I R L
11	21 March 2014	Various Artists	MGP 2014
12	28 March 2014	Various Artists	MGP 2014
13	4 April 2014	Various Artists	MGP 2014
14	11 April 2014	Various Artists	MGP 2014
15	18 April 2014	Various Artists	MGP 2014
16	25 April 2014	Various Artists	MGP 2014
17	2 May 2014	Various Artists	MGP 2014
18	9 May 2014	Various Artists	MGP 2014
19	16 May 2014	Michael Jackson	Xscape
20	23 May 2014	Michael Jackson	Xscape
21	30 May 2014	Coldplay	Ghost Stories
22	6 June 2014	Coldplay	Ghost Stories
23	13 June 2014	Coldplay	Ghost Stories
24	20 June 2014	Jack White	Lazaretto
25	27 June 2014	Lana Del Rey	Ultraviolence
26	4 July 2014	Ed Sheeran	X
27	11 July 2014	5 Seconds of Summer	5 Seconds of Summer
28	18 July 2014	L.I.G.A	L.I.G.A
29	25 July 2014	Rasmus Seebach	Ingen kan love dig i morgen
30	2 August 2014	Rasmus Seebach	Ingen kan love dig i morgen
31	9 August 2014	Eric Clapton and Friends	The Breeze
32	16 August 2014	Rasmus Seebach	Ingen kan love dig i morgen
33	23 August 2014	Rasmus Seebach	Ingen kan love dig i morgen
34	30 August 2014	Eric Clapton and Friends	The Breeze
35	6 September 2014	Tina Dickow	Whispers
36	13 September 2014	Tina Dickow	Whispers
37	20 September 2014	Suspekt	V
38	27 September 2014	Joey Moe	Joey
39	4 October 2014	Leonard Cohen	Popular Problems
40	11 October 2014	Leonard Cohen	Popular Problems
41	18 October 2014	Leonard Cohen	Popular Problems
42	25 October 2014	Leonard Cohen	Popular Problems
43	1 November 2014	Rasmus Walter	Verden i stå
44	8 November 2014	Kandis	Kandis 16
45	15 November 2014	Lars H.U.G.	10 Sekunders stilhed
46	22 November 2014	Pink Floyd	The Endless River
47	29 November 2014	One Direction	Four
48	6 December 2014	One Direction	Four
49	13 December 2014	AC/DC	Rock or Bust
50	20 December 2014	AC/DC	Rock or Bust
51	27 December 2014	AC/DC	Rock or Bust

== 2015 ==
Week	Date	Artist	Album
52/2014	3 January 2015	AC/DC	Rock or Bust
1/2015	10 January 2015	Ed Sheeran	X
2	17 January 2015	Ed Sheeran	X
3	24 January 2015	Ed Sheeran	X
4	31 January 2015	Ed Sheeran	X
5	7 February 2015	Ed Sheeran	X
6	14 February 2015	Marie Key	Tænker du vi danser
7	21 February 2015	Various Artists	MGP 2015
8	28 February 2015	Various Artists	MGP 2015
9	7 March 2015	TV-2	Det gode liv
10	14 March 2015	Various Artists	MGP 2015
11	21 March 2015	Various Artists	MGP 2015
12	28 March 2015	Mark Knopfler	Tracker
13	4 April 2015	Mark Knopfler	Tracker
14	11 April 2015	Various Artists	MGP 2015
15	18 April 2015	Various Artists	MGP 2015
16	25 April 2015	Ulige Numre	Grand Prix
17	2 May 2015	Ed Sheeran	X
18	9 May 2015	MEW	+ -
19	16 May 2015	Ed Sheeran	X
20	23 May 2015	Johnny Hansen	My Favorite Country Songs
21	30 May 2015	Johnny Hansen	My Favorite Country Songs
22	6 June 2015	Cisilia	Unge øjne
23	13 June 2015	Cisilia	Unge øjne
24	20 June 2015	Muse	Drones
25	27 June 2015	Lukas Graham	Lukas Graham (Blue Album)
26	4 July 2015	Lukas Graham	Lukas Graham (Blue Album)
27	11 July 2015	Lukas Graham	Lukas Graham (Blue Album)
28	18 July 2015	Lukas Graham	Lukas Graham (Blue Album)
29	22 July 2015	Lukas Graham	Lukas Graham (Blue Album)
30	29 July 2015	Lukas Graham	Lukas Graham (Blue Album)
31	5 August 2015	Lukas Graham	Lukas Graham (Blue Album)
32	12 August 2015	Lukas Graham	Lukas Graham (Blue Album)
33	19 August 2015	Lukas Graham	Lukas Graham (Blue Album)
34	26 August 2015	Lukas Graham	Lukas Graham (Blue Album)
35	2 September 2015	Lukas Graham	Lukas Graham (Blue Album)
36	9 September 2015	Lukas Graham	Lukas Graham (Blue Album)
37	16 September 2015	Lukas Graham	Lukas Graham (Blue Album)
38	23 September 2015	Lukas Graham	Lukas Graham (Blue Album)
39	30 September 2015	Lukas Graham	Lukas Graham (Blue Album)
40	7 October 2015	Johnny Madsen	Godt nyt
41	14 October 2015	Lars Lilholt	Amulet
42	21 October 2015	Stine Bramsen	Fiftyseven
43	28 October 2015	Lukas Graham	Lukas Graham (Blue Album)
44	4 November 2015	Lukas Graham	Lukas Graham (Blue Album)
45	11 November 2015	Lukas Graham	Lukas Graham (Blue Album)
46	18 November 2015	Rasmus Seebach	Verden ka' vente
47	25 November 2015	Rasmus Seebach	Verden ka' vente
48	2 December 2015	Adele	25
49	9 December 2015	Rasmus Seebach	Verden ka' vente
50	16 December 2015	Rasmus Seebach	Verden ka' vente
51	23 December 2015	Rasmus Seebach	Verden ka' vente
52	30 December 2015	Rasmus Seebach	Verden ka' vente

== 2016 ==
Week	Date	Artist	Album
53/2015	6 January 2016	Justin Bieber	Purpose
1/2016	13 January 2016	Justin Bieber	Purpose
2/2016	20 January 2016	David Bowie	Blackstar
3/2016	27 January 2016	Justin Bieber	Purpose
4/2016	3 February 2016	Justin Bieber	Purpose
5/2016	10 February 2016	Justin Bieber	Purpose
6/2016	17 February 2016	Justin Bieber	Purpose
7/2016	24 February 2016	Justin Bieber	Purpose
8/2016	2 March 2016	Various Artists	MGP 2016
9/2016	9 March 2016	Various Artists	MGP 2016
10/2016	16 March 2016	Justin Bieber	Purpose
11/2016	23 March 2016	Lukas Graham	Lukas Graham (Blue Album)
12/2016	30 March 2016	Mads Langer	Reckless Twin
13/2016	6 April 2016	Justin Bieber	Purpose
14/2016	13 April 2016	Lukas Graham	Lukas Graham (Blue Album)
15/2016	20 April 2016	Lukas Graham	Lukas Graham (Blue Album)
16/2016	27 April 2016	Christopher	Closer
17/2016	4 May 2016	Lukas Graham	Lukas Graham (Blue Album)
18/2016	11 May 2016	Dizzy Mizz Lizzy	Forward in Reverse
19/2016	18 May 2016	Justin Bieber	Purpose
20/2016	25 May 2016	Drake	Views
21/2016	1 June 2016	Drake	Views
22/2016	8 June 2016	Drake	Views
23/2016	15 June 2016	Volbeat	Seal the Deal & Let's Boogie
24/2016	22 June 2016	Volbeat	Seal the Deal & Let's Boogie
25/2016	29 June 2016	Volbeat	Seal the Deal & Let's Boogie
26/2016	6 July 2016	Volbeat	Seal the Deal & Let's Boogie
27/2016	13 July 2016	Volbeat	Seal the Deal & Let's Boogie
28/2016	20 July 2016	Volbeat	Seal the Deal & Let's Boogie
29/2016	27 July 2016	Volbeat	Seal the Deal & Let's Boogie
30/2016	3 August 2016	Volbeat	Seal the Deal & Let's Boogie
31/2016	10 August 2016	Volbeat	Seal the Deal & Let's Boogie
32/2016	17 August 2016	Drake	Views
33/2016	24 August 2016	Drake	Views
34/2016	31 August 2016	Frank Ocean	Blonde
35/2016	7 September 2016	Folkeklubben	Slå flint!
36/2016	14 September 2016	Drake	Views
37/2016	21 September 2016	Nick Cave and the Bad Seeds	Skeleton Tree
38/2016	28 September 2016	Drake	Views
39/2016	5 October 2016	Shawn Mendes	Illuminate
40/2016	12 October 2016	Justin Bieber	Purpose
41/2016	19 October 2016	Shawn Mendes	Illuminate
42/2016	26 October 2016	Shawn Mendes	Illuminate
43/2016	2 November 2016	Leonard Cohen	You Want It Darker
44/2016	9 November 2016	L.O.C.	Anno XV
45/2016	16 November 2016	Jacob Dinesen	Brace Against the Storm
46/2016	23 November 2016	Leonard Cohen	You Want It Darker
47/2016	30 November 2016	Metallica	Hardwired... to Self-Destruct
48/2016	7 December 2016	The Weeknd	Starboy
49/2016	14 December 2016	The Weeknd	Starboy
50/2016	21 December 2016	The Weeknd	Starboy
51/2016	28 December 2016	The Weeknd	Starboy

== 2017 ==
Week	Date	Artist	Album
52/2016	4 January 2017	The Weeknd	Starboy
1/2017	11 January 2017	The Weeknd	Starboy
2/2017	18 January 2017	The Weeknd	Starboy
3/2017	25 January 2017	The Weeknd	Starboy
4/2017	1 February 2017	The Weeknd	Starboy
5/2017	8 February 2017	Simon Kvamm	Vandmand
6/2017	15 February 2017	Gnags	Nørd
7/2017	22 February 2017	The Weeknd	Starboy
8/2017	1 March 2017	Suspekt	100% Jesus
9/2017	8 March 2017	The Weeknd	Starboy
10/2017	15 March 2017	Ed Sheeran	÷
11/2017	22 March 2017	Ed Sheeran	÷
12/2017	29 March 2017	Ed Sheeran	÷
13/2017	5 April 2017	Ed Sheeran	÷
14/2017	12 April 2017	Ed Sheeran	÷
15/2017	19 April 2017	Kim Larsen and Kjukken	Øst for Vesterled
16/2017	26 April 2017	Ed Sheeran	÷
17/2017	3 May 2017	Ed Sheeran	÷
18/2017	10 May 2017	Ed Sheeran	÷
19/2017	17 May 2017	Ed Sheeran	÷
20/2017	24 May 2017	Ed Sheeran	÷
21/2017	31 May 2017	Ed Sheeran	÷
22/2017	7 June 2017	Ed Sheeran	÷
23/2017	14 June 2017	Ed Sheeran	÷
24/2017	21 June 2017	Ed Sheeran	÷
25/2017	28 June 2017	Ed Sheeran	÷
26/2017	5 July 2017	Ed Sheeran	÷
27/2017	12 July 2017	Ed Sheeran	÷
28/2017	19 July 2017	Ed Sheeran	÷
29/2017	26 July 2017	Ed Sheeran	÷
30/2017	2 August 2017	Ed Sheeran	÷
31/2017	9 August 2017	Ed Sheeran	÷
32/2017	16 August 2017	Ed Sheeran	÷
33/2017	23 August 2017	Ed Sheeran	÷
34/2017	30 August 2017	Ed Sheeran	÷
35/2017	6 September 2017	Volbeat	Seal the Deal & Let's Boogie
36/2017	13 September 2017	Ed Sheeran	÷
37/2017	20 September 2017	Sebastian	Sange til Drømmescenariet
38/2017	27 September 2017	Ed Sheeran	÷
39/2017	4 October 2017	Ed Sheeran	÷
40/2017	11 October 2017	Poul Krebs	Maleren og delfinerne på bugten
41/2017	18 October 2017	Phlake	Weird Invitations
42/2017	25 October 2017	Ed Sheeran	÷
43/2017	1 November 2017	Ed Sheeran	÷
44/2017	8 November 2017	Ed Sheeran	÷
45/2017	15 November 2017	Sam Smith	The Thrill of It All
46/2017	22 November 2017	Sam Smith	The Thrill of It All
47/2017	29 November 2017	Ed Sheeran	÷
48/2017	6 December 2017	Rasmus Seebach	Før vi mødte dig
49/2017	13 December 2017	Rasmus Seebach	Før vi mødte dig
50/2017	20 December 2017	Rasmus Seebach	Før vi mødte dig
51/2017	27 December 2017	Rasmus Seebach	Før vi mødte dig

== 2018 ==
Week	Date	Artist	Album
52/2017	3 January 2018	Rasmus Seebach	Før vi mødte dig
1/2018	10 January 2018	Ed Sheeran	÷
2/2018	17 January 2018	Ed Sheeran	÷
3/2018	24 January 2018	Ed Sheeran	÷
4/2018	31 January 2018	Ed Sheeran	÷
5/2018	7 February 2018	Ed Sheeran	÷
6/2018	14 February 2018	Justin Timberlake	Man of the Woods
7/2018	21 February 2018	Various artists	Black Panther: The Album
8/2018	28 February 2018	Various artists	MGP 2018
9/2018	7 March 2018	Various artists	MGP 2018
10/2018	14 March 2018	Node	Cambiarme
11/2018	21 March 2018	Node	Cambiarme
12/2018	28 March 2018	XXXTentacion	?
13/2018	4 April 2018	XXXTentacion	?
14/2018	11 April 2018	The Weeknd	My Dear Melancholy,
15/2018	18 April 2018	XXXTentacion	?
16/2018	25 April 2018	XXXTentacion	?
17/2018	2 May 2018	Sivas	Ultra
18/2018	9 May 2018	Post Malone	Beerbongs & Bentleys
19/2018	16 May 2018	Post Malone	Beerbongs & Bentleys
20/2018	23 May 2018	Post Malone	Beerbongs & Bentleys
21/2018	30 May 2018	Post Malone	Beerbongs & Bentleys
22/2018	6 June 2018	Post Malone	Beerbongs & Bentleys
23/2018	13 June 2018	Post Malone	Beerbongs & Bentleys
24/2018	20 June 2018	Post Malone	Beerbongs & Bentleys
25/2018	27 June 2018	XXXTentacion	?
26/2018	4 July 2018	XXXTentacion	?
27/2018	11 July 2018	Drake	Scorpion
28/2018	18 July 2018	Drake	Scorpion
29/2018	25 July 2018	Drake	Scorpion
30/2018	1 August 2018	Drake	Scorpion
31/2018	8 August 2018	Drake	Scorpion
32/2018	15 August 2018	Travis Scott	Astroworld
33/2018	22 August 2018	Drake	Scorpion
34/2018	29 August 2018	Drake	Scorpion
35/2018	5 September 2018	Drake	Scorpion
36/2018	12 September 2018	Eminem	Kamikaze
37/2018	19 September 2018	Eminem	Kamikaze
38/2018	26 September 2018	Eminem	Kamikaze
39/2018	3 October 2018	Nephew	Ring-i-Ring
40/2018	10 October 2018	Tina Dickow	Fastland
41/2018	17 October 2018	Kim Larsen	Midt om natten
42/2018	24 October 2018	Kim Larsen	Midt om natten
43/2018	31 October 2018	MØ	Forever Neverland
44/2018	7 November 2018	Lukas Graham	3 (The Purple Album)
45/2018	14 November 2018	Lukas Graham	3 (The Purple Album)
46/2018	21 November 2018	Lukas Graham	3 (The Purple Album)
47/2018	28 November 2018	Jacob Dinesen	Found It
48/2018	5 December 2018	Lukas Graham	3 (The Purple Album)
49/2018	12 December 2018	Michael Bublé	Christmas
50/2018	19 December 2018	Michael Bublé	Christmas
51/2018	26 December 2018	Volbeat	Let's Boogie! (Live from Telia Parken)

== 2019 ==
Week	Date	Artist	Album
52/2018	2 January 2019	Michael Bublé	Christmas
53/2018	9 January 2019	Lady Gaga and Bradley Cooper	A Star Is Born
1/2019	16 January 2019	Lady Gaga and Bradley Cooper	A Star Is Born
2/2019	23 January 2019	Lady Gaga and Bradley Cooper	A Star Is Born
3/2019	30 January 2019	Lady Gaga and Bradley Cooper	A Star Is Born
4/2019	6 February 2019	Lady Gaga and Bradley Cooper	A Star Is Born
5/2019	13 February 2019	Lady Gaga and Bradley Cooper	A Star Is Born
6/2019	20 February 2019	Ariana Grande	Thank U, Next
7/2019	27 February 2019	Lady Gaga and Bradley Cooper	A Star Is Born
8/2019	6 March 2019	Lady Gaga and Bradley Cooper	A Star Is Born
9/2019	13 March 2019	Various artists	MGP 2019
10/2019	20 March 2019	Lady Gaga and Bradley Cooper	A Star Is Born
11/2019	27 March 2019	Hans Philip	Forevigt
12/2019	3 April 2019	Lady Gaga and Bradley Cooper	A Star Is Born
13/2019	10 April 2019	Kim Larsen	Sange fra første sal
14/2019	17 April 2019	Kim Larsen	Sange fra første sal
15/2019	24 April 2019	Kim Larsen	Sange fra første sal
16/2019	1 May 2019	Billie Eilish	When We All Fall Asleep, Where Do We Go?
17/2019	8 May 2019	Sivas	Contra
18/2019	15 May 2019	Billie Eilish	When We All Fall Asleep, Where Do We Go?
19/2019	22 May 2019	Billie Eilish	When We All Fall Asleep, Where Do We Go?
20/2019	29 May 2019	Rammstein	Rammstein
21/2019	5 June 2019	Billie Eilish	When We All Fall Asleep, Where Do We Go?
22/2019	12 June 2019	D.A.D.	A Prayer for the Loud
23/2019	19 June 2019	Billie Eilish	When We All Fall Asleep, Where Do We Go?
24/2019	26 June 2019	Branco	Baba Business
25/2019	3 July 2019	Branco	Baba Business
26/2019	10 July 2019	Branco	Baba Business
27/2019	17 July 2019	Branco	Baba Business
28/2019	24 July 2019	Gilli	Kiko
29/2019	31 July 2019	Gilli	Kiko
30/2019	7 August 2019	Gilli	Kiko
31/2019	14 August 2019	Gilli	Kiko
32/2019	21 August 2019	Gilli	Kiko
33/2019	28 August 2019	Gilli	Kiko
34/2019	4 September 2019	Gilli	Kiko
35/2019	11 September 2019	Gilli	Kiko
36/2019	18 September 2019	Post Malone	Hollywood's Bleeding
37/2019	26 September 2019	Stepz	Stepzologi
38/2019	2 October 2019	Post Malone	Hollywood's Bleeding
39/2019	9 October 2019	Post Malone	Hollywood's Bleeding
40/2019	16 October 2019	Post Malone	Hollywood's Bleeding
41/2019	23 October 2019	Post Malone	Hollywood's Bleeding
42/2019	30 October 2019	Post Malone	Hollywood's Bleeding
43/2019	6 November 2019	Kanye West	Jesus Is King
44/2019	13 November 2019	Post Malone	Hollywood's Bleeding
45/2019	20 November 2019	Rasmus Seebach	Tak for turen: De første 10 är
46/2019	27 November 2019	Rasmus Seebach	Tak for turen: De første 10 är
47/2019	4 December 2019	Rasmus Seebach	Tak for turen: De første 10 är
48/2019	11 December 2019	Rasmus Seebach	Tak for turen: De første 10 är
49/2019	18 December 2019	Rasmus Seebach	Tak for turen: De første 10 är
50/2019	25 December 2019	Rasmus Seebach	Tak for turen: De første 10 är
