= Ingen kan love dig i morgen =

Studio album by Rasmus Seebach
- Released: 4 November 2013
- Recorded: 2013
- Genre: Pop
- Label: ArtPeople
- Producers: Rasmus Seebach, Nicolai Seebach, Ankerstjerne

Rasmus Seebach chronology
Mer' end kærlighed (2011)	Ingen kan love dig i morgen (2013)	Verden ka' vente (2015)

Professional ratings
Review scores
Source	Rating
Gaffa	4/6 stars

Ingen kan love dig i morgen is the third studio album by the Danish singer-songwriter Rasmus Seebach released on 4 November 2013 at ArtPeople label, as a follow-up to the hugely successful debut album Rasmus Seebach and the follow-up Mer' end kærlighed.

The album received triple platinum certification in the first week of its release and hit the official Danish Singles Chart at No. 1 on week 46/2013 dated 22 November 2013. During 2013–2014, it has stayed at the top of the Tracklisten Albums Chart for 12 weeks at various intervals ranging from 22 November 2013 until 16 August 2014.

The album was the No. 1 album of 2014, the No. 8 album of 2015 and the No. 32 album of 2016. At 554 weeks, it is the all-time longest-charting album in Denmark.

== Track listing ==
No.	Title	Writer(s)	Producer(s)	Length
1.	"Sandstorm"	Rasmus Seebach, Nicolai Seebach, Lars Ankerstjerne	Seebach & Seebach, Ankerstjerne	3:21
2.	"Øde ø"	R. Seebach, N. Seebach, Ankerstjerne, Daniel Davidsen, Peter Wallevik	Davidsen, Wallevik	4:11
3.	"I min t-shirt"	R. Seebach, N. Seebach, Ankerstjerne, Vincent Pontare, Johan Wetterberg	Seebach & Seebach, Ankerstjerne	3:31
4.	"Olivia"	R. Seebach, N. Seebach, Ankerstjerne	Seebach & Seebach, Ankerstjerne	3:44
5.	"Tusind farver"	R. Seebach, N. Seebach, Ankerstjerne	Seebach & Seebach, Ankerstjerne, Peter Düring	3:33
6.	"En verden uden dig"	R. Seebach, N. Seebach, Ankerstjerne	Seebach & Seebach, Ankerstjerne	4:03
7.	"Hjemløs"	R. Seebach, N. Seebach, Ankerstjerne	Seebach & Seebach, Ankerstjerne	3:50
8.	"Fri"	R. Seebach, N. Seebach, Ankerstjerne	Seebach & Seebach, Ankerstjerne	3:24
9.	"De ka' sig' hva' de vil"	R. Seebach, N. Seebach, Ankerstjerne	Seebach & Seebach, Ankerstjerne	2:55
10.	"Venner"	R. Seebach, N. Seebach, Ankerstjerne	Seebach & Seebach, Ankerstjerne	3:41
11.	"Ingen kan love dig i morgen"	R. Seebach, N. Seebach, Ankerstjerne	Seebach & Seebach, Ankerstjerne	2:45
12.	"Du' det dejligste"	Tommy Seebach, Ivan Pedersen	Seebach & Seebach, Martin Sommer	3:24

== Charts ==
=== Weekly charts ===
Chart (2013)	Peak position
Danish Albums (Hitlisten)	1
Swedish Albums (Sverigetopplistan)	38

=== Year-end charts ===
Chart	Year	Position
Danish Albums (Hitlisten)	2017	23
Danish Albums (Hitlisten)	2019	29
Danish Albums (Hitlisten)	2020	37
Danish Albums (Hitlisten)	2021	27
Danish Albums (Hitlisten)	2022	22
Danish Albums (Hitlisten)	2023	23
Danish Albums (Hitlisten)	2024	21

== Certifications ==
Region	Certification	Certified units/sales
Denmark (IFPI Danmark)	18× Platinum	360,000^{‡}
^{‡} Sales+streaming figures based on certification alone.
