= I mine øjne =

Single by Rasmus Seebach

from the album Mer' end kærlighed
- Released: 22 August 2011
- Recorded: 2009
- Genre: Pop
- Length: 4:14
- Label: ArtPeople
- Songwriters: Rasmus Seebach, Nicolai Seebach, Lars Ankerstjerne, Niels Brinck

Rasmus Seebach singles chronology
"Natteravn" (2010)	"I mine øjne" (2011)	"Under stjernerne på himlen" (2011)

Music video
- "I mine øjne" on YouTube

"I mine øjne" (In my eyes) is a Danish song by the singer and songwriter Rasmus Seebach from the singer's second album Mer' end kærlighed. The single was released on 22 August 2011 with the ArtPeople label as an advance single of the album.

== Context ==
"I mine øjne" is about Rasmus Seebach's love for his family. It uses the melody in the chorus from Nicolai Kielstrup's song "Vokseværk" (meaning "growing pains" in Danish) which was a winning song for Kielstrup in Dansk Melodi Grand Prix, as Seebach says the melody of the song co-written by him and others had affected him. "It's a piece of the song I've actually written seven years ago and got stuck in my head ever since I heard it. There is not a week where I have not hummed it. The melody is almost magical to me. I've always wanted to own sing it, and suddenly made sense when I put my own words. I like really much of the song now".

The basic idea for the song came at an Easter party where Rasmus Seebach considered his family and realized how much he loves them, while he was ridden down by guilt. He realized how great it was to have a mother, sister and brother in his life after losing his father Tommy Seebach because of alcoholism.

== Release and charts ==
The song received positive reviews. The single went straight to number one in the Danish Singles Chart the week it was released, selling streaming and airplay of over 15,000 downloads that week. By January 2012, the single, having stayed #1 for three consecutive weeks on the chart was certified 2× platinum for 60,000 downloads and an additional 2× platinum for streaming 200,000 units.

Chart performance for "I mine øjne"
Chart (2009–2010)	Peak position
Denmark (Tracklisten)	1

== Certifications ==
Certifications for "I mine øjne"
Region	Certification	Certified units/sales
Denmark (IFPI Danmark)	2× Platinum	60,000^{^}
Denmark (IFPI Danmark)	2× Platinum	200,000^{†}
^{^} Shipments figures based on certification alone.^{†} Streaming-only figures based on certification alone.

== Music video ==
The music video shows Rasmus Seebach meeting various fans greeting him and asking for autographs or shows him visiting his sister and brother, and the video ends with memories of visiting his mother's home.
