= Denmark in the Eurovision Song Contest 1993 =

- Eurovision Song Contest 1993
- Participating broadcaster: Danmarks Radio (DR)
- Country: Denmark
- Selection process: Dansk Melodi Grand Prix 1993
- Selection date: 3 April 1993

Competing entry
- Song: "Under stjernerne på himlen"
- Artist: Seebach Band
- Songwriters: Tommy Seebach; Keld Heick

Placement
- Final result: 22nd, 9 points

Participation chronology

Denmark was represented at the Eurovision Song Contest 1993 with the song "Under stjernerne på himlen", composed by Tommy Seebach, with lyrics by Keld Heick, and performed by the Seebach Band. The Danish participating broadcaster, Danmarks Radio (DR), organised the Dansk Melodi Grand Prix 1993 in order to select its entry for the contest. This was Seebach's third Eurovision appearance, having previously represented Denmark in 1979 and in 1981 with Debbie Cameron.

== Before Eurovision ==
=== Dansk Melodi Grand Prix 1993 ===
Danmarks Radio (DR) continued to use the Dansk Melodi Grand Prix to select its entry for Eurovision. The broadcaster held the national final on 3 April 1993 in Odense, hosted by Keld Heick and Kirsten Siggaard.

Ten songs competed in the contest and the winner was selected over two rounds of voting. In the first round, a nine-member jury selected the top five songs to advance to the second round of voting, where the winner was selected solely by a public televote. The results of the public televote were revealed by Denmark's regions and led to the victory of Tommy Seebach Band with the song "Under stjernerne på himlen". This was Seebach's seventh appearance at Dansk Melodi Grand Prix, having previously won twice (in 1979 and in 1981 with Debbie Cameron) as well as placing 2nd in 1982, 4th in 1984, 2nd in 1985, and 4th in 1987.

The show was watched by 1.9 million viewers in Denmark, making it the most popular show of the week. It was also broadcast alongside Greenland's KNR-TV.

First Round – 3 April 1993
R/O	Artist	Song	Songwriter(s)	Result
1	Teddy Edelmann	"Går det ikk', går det nok"	Carsten Warming	—N/a
2	Vivi Jacobsen	"Født til kærlighed"	Rene A. Jensen, Paw Mølgård, Vivi Jacobsen	Advanced
3	The Hooklines	"Godmorgen dag"	Ivar Lind Greiner, Iben Plesner	—N/a
4	Anders Nyborg	"Elsker kun dig"	Fini Høstrup	—N/a
5	Ditte Højgaard Andersen	"Første forårsdag"	Søren Bundgaard	Advanced
6	Six-Pack	"Der er mer' imellem dig og mig"	Jes Kerstein Larsen, Ebbe Ravn	Advanced
7	Anne Karin	"Hvor er din drøm"	Steen Gjerulff, Gunnar Geertsen	Advanced
8	Tommy Seebach Band	"Under stjernerne på himlen"	Tommy Seebach, Keld Heick	Advanced
9	Birgitte Gade	"Bohemian"	Michael Ronson, Martin Riel	—N/a
10	Gaia	"Uno mundo"	Helge Engelbrecht	—N/a

Second Round – 3 April 1993
R/O	Artist	Song	Televote	Place
1	Vivi Jacobsen	"Født til kærlighed"	2,281	5
2	Ditte Højgaard Andersen	"Første forårsdag"	4,419	4
3	Six-Pack	"Der er mer' imellem dig og mig"	13,715	2
4	Anne Karin	"Hvor er din drøm"	6,066	3
5	Tommy Seebach Band	"Under stjernerne på himlen"	16,463	1

Detailed Regional Televoting Results
R/O	Song	Jutland					Funen	Islands	North Zealand	Capital Region	Total
R/O	Song	North	West	East	Central	South	Funen	Islands	North Zealand	Capital Region	Total
1	"Født til kærlighed"	213	163	375	253	21	201	227	409	419	2,281
2	"Første forårsdag"	320	387	649	368	165	329	461	809	931	4,419
3	"Der er mer' imellem dig og mig"	1,126	964	2,230	1,524	531	1,329	1,308	2,275	2,428	13,715
4	"Hvor er din drøm"	489	743	1,011	611	189	564	668	878	913	6,066
5	"Under stjernerne på himlen"	1,779	1,605	2,507	1,843	704	1,222	2,397	2,484	1,922	16,463

== At Eurovision ==
Seebach performed 5th at the Eurovision Song Contest 1993 in Millstreet, Ireland, following Switzerland and preceding Greece. "Under stjernerne på himlen" placed 22nd of the 25 competing countries, receiving a total of 9 points. Up to this point, this was the worst-ranking song Denmark had sent to the Contest. Additionally, this relegated Denmark from competing in the Eurovision Song Contest 1994, after placing in the bottom 6 entries.

The contest was shown on DR TV, with commentary by Jørgen de Mylius, and on radio station DR P3, with commentary by Jens Michael Nielsen. The contest was watched by a total of 1.5 million viewers in Denmark.

=== Voting ===
Points awarded to Denmark
Score	Country
12 points	
10 points	
8 points	
7 points	
6 points	
5 points	Bosnia and Herzegovina
4 points	
3 points	Luxembourg
2 points	
1 point	Sweden

Points awarded by Denmark
Score	Country
12 points	France
10 points	Switzerland
8 points	United Kingdom
7 points	Sweden
6 points	Ireland
5 points	Malta
4 points	Iceland
3 points	Germany
2 points	Cyprus
1 point	Portugal
