= Hvor små vi er =

Single by Giv til Asien
- Released: 17 January 2005
- Recorded: 2005
- Genre: Charity song
- Length: 3:55
- Label: Universal Music
- Songwriters: Remee (lyrics and melody); Nicolai Seebach (music); Rasmus Seebach (music)
- Producers: Remee, Peter Biker, Nicolai Seebach, Rasmus Seebach

Giv til Asien singles chronology
"Lidt i fem" (2010)	"Hvor små vi er" (2005)	"I mine øjne" (2011)

"Hvor små vi er" is a 2005 Danish charity single performed by a group of Danish artists (singers, actors and musicians) under the name Giv Til Asien (translated as Give to Asia). A small number of artists from other European countries also participated.

The single with lyrics by Remee and music by Nicolai Seebach and Rasmus Seebach, was released in aid of various charities for tsunami relief as a result of the 2004 Indian Ocean earthquake.

== Beneficiaries ==
The revenues from the sale of the single went to:

- Médecins Sans Frontières
- The Danish Red Cross
- DanChurchAid (Danish Folkekirkens Nødhjælp)
- UNICEF
- Save the Children (Danish Red Barnet)
- International Federation of the Phonographic Industry (IFPI).

== Track list ==
- Digital download
  - "Hvor små vi er" – 3:55
- CD single
  - "Hvor små vi er" (Radio Edit)
  - "Hvor små vi er" (Instrumental)
  - "Hvor små vi er" (A Capella)

== Credits ==
- Lyrics and melody: Remee
- Music by Nicolai Seebach & Rasmus Seebach
- Executive producer: Remee
- Producer: Remee, Peter Biker, Nicolai Seebach and Rasmus Seebach
- Vocal producer: Peter Biker and Remee
- Guitar: Daniel Davidsen
- Other instruments: Nicolai Seebach and Rasmus Seebach
- Technicians: Hans Nielsen og Kristian Dalsgaard
- Studio: Focus Recording Studios, Vanløse
- Mixing:Mads Nilsson, White Room
- Mastering: Jan Eliasson, Tocano

== Artists ==
- Alberte Winding
- Alex Nyborg Madsen
- Alex
- Allan Vegenfeldt
- Anne Linnet
- Ataf (Ataf Khawaja)
- Burhan G
- Cæcilie Norby
- Søren Bregendal
- Casper Christensen
- Chief 1
- Christina Groth
- Hush
- Jokeren
- Julie Maria
- Kasper Winding
- Kenneth Thordal
- Lene Nystrøm Rasted
- Liv Lykke
- Mads Mikkelsen
- Maria & Michael
- Morten Woods
- Nadia Gudmundsson
- Niels Brinck
- Nik & Jay
- Nikolai Seebach
- Nikolaj Christensen
- Nikolaj Lie Kaas
- Outlandish
- Paprika Steen
- Pernille Højmark
- Poul Krebs
- Rasmus Nøhr
- Rasmus Seebach
- Remee
- Søren Nystrøm Rasted
- Søs Fenger
- Saseline Sørensen
- Sonja Richter
- Steen Birger Jørgensen
- Stig Møller
- Stine Jacobsen
- Szhirley
- Tue West
- Uffe Holm
- Virgo
- Alan Driscoll

== Chart performance ==
The single was released in January 2005 and went straight into No. 1 on chart of 28 January 2005 staying on the top for 14 weeks in two runs (12 weeks and 2 weeks). It stayed in total 26 weeks in the charts.

It was rereleased in December 2007 and again went in straight to No. 1 for ine week.

Hitlisten (2005)	Highest position	Certificates
Danish Singles Chart	1	13× Platinum
