= Ankerstjerne (album) =

Studio album by Lars Ankerstjerne
- Released: 10 October 2011
- Recorded: 2011
- Genre: Pop
- Label: ArtPeople

Ankerstjerne is the first eponymous studio album of Danish artist Ankerstjerne (sometimes credited as Lars Ankerstjerne, earlier known as Jinks). The album was released on ArtPeople record label and alongside solo works by Ankerstjerne includes collaborations with Burhan G, Peter Bjørnskov, Alberte, Xander, Sarah West and Rasmus Seebach.

== Release and reception ==
The album was released on 10 October 2011, on its first week of release, it entered at #6 on the Danish Albums Chart. The same week, many of the singles appearing in the album were downloaded heavily and four of them appeared on the Danish Singles Chart, namely "Den første nat" featuring Xander (entered at #10), "Fotografi af dig" featuring Rasmus Seebach) (entered at #22), "Nu vi to" feat. featuring Burhan G (at #27) and "1000 år" featuring Rasmus Seebach (at #37).

In earlier pre-releases, two singles had already been hits prior to the album's release: "Tag hvad du vil" by Ankerstjerne and Burhan G reaching #2 making it the most successful release of Ankerstjerne reaching #2 and "Nattog" that peaked at #8 in the Danish Singles Chart.

== Track listing ==
No.	Title	Length
1.	"Lysbillede"	1:19
2.	"Tag hvad du vil (feat. Burhan G)"	3:26
3.	"Nattog (feat. Peter Bjørnskov)"	3:23
4.	"Se dig i mørket"	3:32
5.	"Den første nat (feat Xander)"	3:45
6.	"Lysbillede 2"	1:10
7.	"Mit hjertes tyv (feat. Alberte)"	3:56
8.	"Kender mig nu (feat. Burhan G)"	3:49
9.	"Fotografi af dig (feat. Rasmus Seebach)"	3:27
10.	"Nu vi to (feat. Burhan G)"	3:39
11.	"Alle mine tårer (feat. Sarah West)"	3:47
12.	"Lysbillede 3"	1:54
13.	"1000 år (feat. Rasmus Seebach)"	3:40

== Charts ==
Hitliste (2011)	Peak Position
Danish Albums Chart	6
