= Mer' end kærlighed =

Studio album by Rasmus Seebach
- Released: 17 October 2011
- Recorded: 2011
- Genre: Pop
- Label: ArtPeople
- Producers: Rasmus Seebach, Nicolai Seebach, Ianick, Providers

Rasmus Seebach chronology
Rasmus Seebach (2009)	Mer' end kærlighed (2011)	Ingen kan love dig i morgen (2013)

Mer' end kærlighed is the second studio album by the Danish singer-songwriter Rasmus Seebach released on 17 October 2011 at ArtPeople label, as a follow-up to the hugely successful debut album Rasmus Seebach.

The album received platinum for 20,000 copies ordered, the same day as it went on sale on iTunes. It hit the official Danish Singles Chart at #1 on week 43/2011 dated 28 October 2011.

== Editions ==
In addition to the general release that contains 12 songs, Mer' end kærlighed also appeared in a special Limited Edition, that includes, in addition to the 12 songs, a DR1 documentary film entitled Snapshot: Rasmus Seebach and a 20-minute interview during which he also gives a rendition of "I mine øjne".

Before the album was released exclusively on iTunes Store on 14 October 2011, with the bonus track "Calling (Nighthawk)", there is an English version of the hit "Natteravn".

== Singles ==
On 22 August 2011, prior to the release of the album, Seebach released "I mine øjne" as an advance single. Written by Rasmus Seebach, Nicolai Seebach, Lars Ankerstjerne and Niels Brinck. It talks about how much Rasmus loves his family but that he often forgets to tell them that. The single went straight to #1 in the Danish Singles Chart, from streaming and airplay lists and sold over 15,000 downloads in just one week. By late September 2011, "I mine øjne" had gone platinum with more than 30,000 downloads. The music video shows Rasmus Seebach meeting various fans greeting him and asking for autographs or shows him visiting his sister and brother, and the video ends with memories of visiting his mother's home.

On 21 October 2011, two more songs from the album appeared in the Danish Singles Chart, "Under stjernerne på himlen" and the eponymous title track "Mer' end kærlighed". On 28 October, yet another two songs entered the Danish charts, "Millionær" (feat Ankerstjerne) and "Lys i din Lejlighed".

== Other songs ==
The album's last track is a remake of his father Tommy Seebach's song "Under stjernerne på himlen", the song through which Tommy had won the Danish Melodi Grand Prix 1993. About the motivation to re-record the song, Rasmus Seebach says, he wanted to reinterpret it as an acoustic version, and it took one take to record it.

== Track listing ==
No.	Title	Writer(s)	Length
1.	"Lys i din lejlighed"	Rasmus Seebach, Nicolai Seebach, Lars Ankerstjerne	4:05
2.	"I mine øjne"	R. Seebach, N. Seebach, Ankerstjerne, Niels Brinck	4:15
3.	"Falder"	R. Seebach, N. Seebach, Ankerstjerne	3:09
4.	"Mer' end kærlighed"	R. Seebach, N. Seebach, Ankerstjerne	4:10
5.	"Millionær (feat Ankerstjerne)"	R. Seebach, N. Seebach, Ankerstjerne	4:29
6.	"Vi lever"	R. Seebach, N. Seebach, Ankerstjerne, Jahn Gran	4:31
7.	"Igen i dag"	R. Seebach, N. Seebach, Ankerstjerne	4:09
8.	"Nangijala"	R. Seebach, N. Seebach, Ankerstjerne	3:54
9.	"Ringe i vandet"	R. Seebach, N. Seebach, Ankerstjerne	3:29
10.	"Vover på at gå"	R. Seebach, N. Seebach, Ankerstjerne	3:54
11.	"Sirenerne"	R. Seebach, N. Seebach, Ankerstjerne, Rasmus Stabell, Jeppe Federspiel	4:26
12.	"Under stjernerne på himlen"	Tommy Seebach, Keld Heick	2:53

iTunes bonus track

No.	Title	Writer(s)	Length
1.	Untitled	Rasmus Seebach
13.	"Calling (Nighthawk)" ((Provider vs. Rasmus Seebach)	R. Seebach, N. Seebach, Ankerstjerne, Stabell, Federspiel	4:04

== Charts ==
=== Weekly charts ===
Chart (2011–2012)	Peak position
Danish Albums (Hitlisten)	1
Swedish Albums (Sverigetopplistan)	19

=== Year-end charts ===
Chart (2017)	Position
Danish Albums (Hitlisten)	38
Chart (2018)	Position
Danish Albums (Hitlisten)	43
Chart (2019)	Position
Danish Albums (Hitlisten)	41
Chart (2020)	Position
Danish Albums (Hitlisten)	47
Chart (2021)	Position
Danish Albums (Hitlisten)	29
Chart (2022)	Position
Danish Albums (Hitlisten)	23
Chart (2023)	Position
Danish Albums (Hitlisten)	28
Chart (2024)	Position
Danish Albums (Hitlisten)	18

== Certifications ==
Region	Certification	Certified units/sales
Denmark (IFPI Danmark)	19× Platinum	380,000^{‡}
^{‡} Sales+streaming figures based on certification alone.
