= Keld Heick =

Danish singer, songwriter and musician (born 1946)

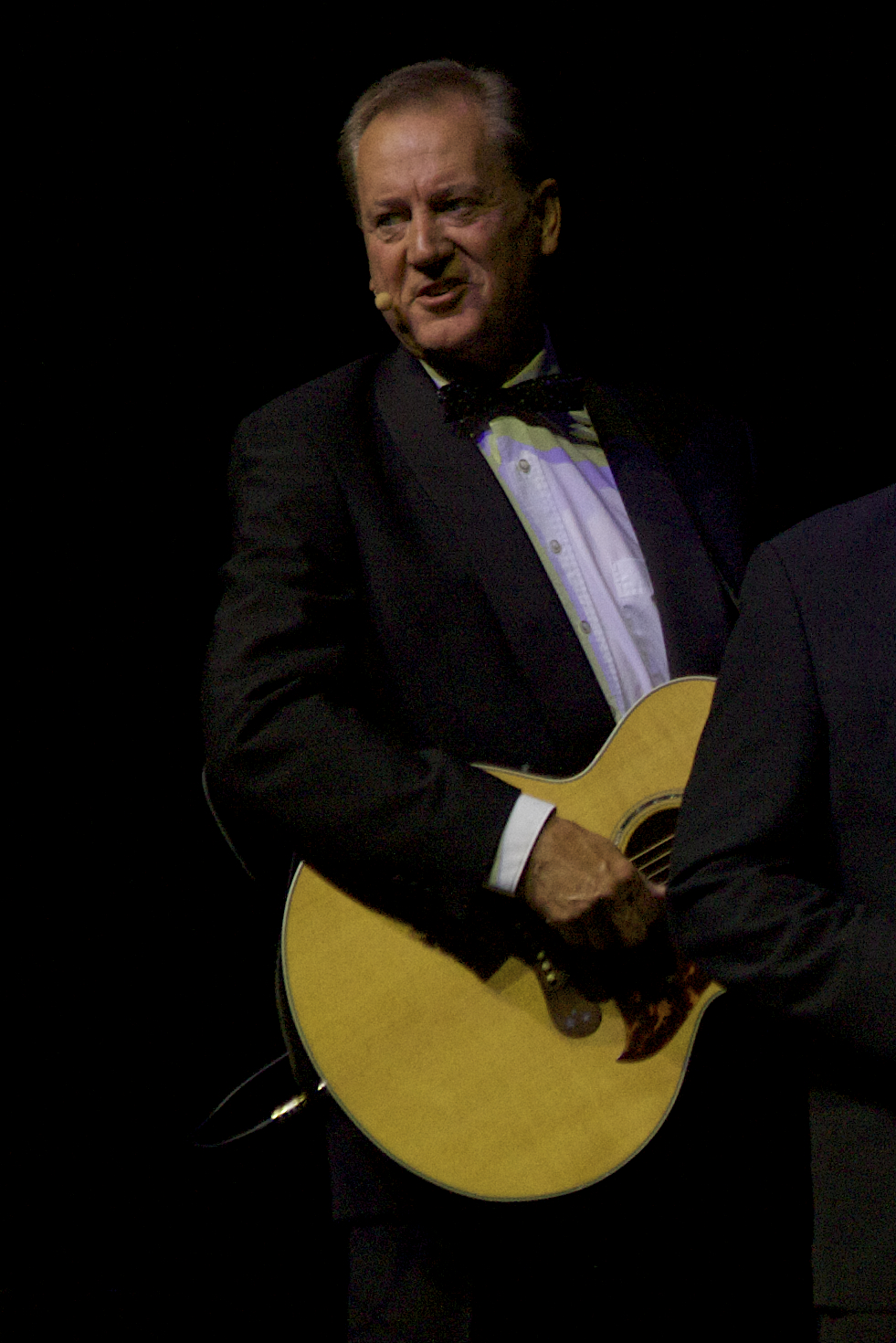
Keld Heick

Keld Heick (born 24 February 1946) is a Danish singer, songwriter and musician. He is best known for his contribution to the Dansk Melodi Grand Prix, where he has submitted over 30 songs.

Heick was born in Frederiksberg. In 1963 he formed the band Keld & the Donkeys. The band's big breakthrough came in 1966 with the song "Ved landsbyens gadekær" (eng. "At the village pond").

In 1976 he decided to merge his professional and personal life, when he made a duo with his wife Hilda Heick. They made their debut with the hit "Do you speak English?" and later had another hit with "Jeg ringer på fredag" (eng. "I'll call you this Friday").

Besides the music Keld Heick has also worked as a TV host. In 1996-1997 he was the host of Lykkehjulet the Danish version of Wheel of Fortune. From 1997 to 2002 he was the host of the music talkshow Musikbutikken on DR1.

Keld Heick married Hilda Heick in 1968. They have one daughter, Annette Heick.

== Dansk Melodi Grand Prix ==
- 1978 - Eventyr sung by Grethe Ingmann, finished 5th in the Melodi Grand Prix
- 1979 - Disco Tango sung by Tommy Seebach, won the national final - finished 6th at the Eurovision Song Contest in Jeruselum
- 1980 - Bye Bye sung by Lecia & Lucienne, finished 7th in the national final
- 1981 - Krøller eller ej sung by Tommy Seebach & Debbie Cameron, won the national final - finished 11th at the Eurovision Song Contest in Dublin
- 1982 - Hip hurra det' min fødselsdag sung by Tommy Seebach, finished 2nd in the national final
- 1983 - Og livet går sung by Kirsten Siggaard & Sir Henry, finished 7th in the national final
- 1984 - Pyjamas for to sung by Tommy Seebach, finished 4th in the national final
- 1984 - Det' lige det sung by Hot Eyes, won the national final - finished 4th at the Eurovision Song Contest in Luxembourg
- 1985 - Det' det jeg altid har sagt sung by Tommy Seebach finished 2nd in the national final
- 1985 - Sku' du spørge fra no'en? sung by Hot Eyes, won the national final - finished 11th at the Eurovision Song Contest in Gothenburg
- 1986 - Mirakler sung by himself and Hilda Heick, finished 5th in the national final
- 1986 - Sig det som det er sung by Hot Eyes, finished 4th in the national final
- 1986 - Vil du med sung by Birthe Kjær, finished 2nd in the national final
- 1987 - Farvel og tak sung by Hot Eyes, finished 5th in the national final
- 1987 - Ha' det godt sung by himself and Hilda Heick, finished 6th in the national final
- 1987 - Hva' er du ude på sung by Birthe Kjær, finished 2nd in the national final
- 1987 - Det' gratis sung by Tommy Seebach, finished 4th in the national final
- 1988 - Ka' du se hva' jeg sa'? sung by Hot Eyes, won the national final - finished 3rd at the Eurovision Song Contest in Dublin
- 1988 - Det' okay' sung by Henriette Lykke, finished 3rd in the national final
- 1989 - Vi maler byen rød sung by Birthe Kjær, won the national final - finished 3rd at the Eurovision Song Contest in Lausanne
- 1989 - Sommerregn sung by himself and Hilda Heick, finished 7th in the national final
- 1989 - Endnu en nat sung by Gry Johansen, finished 6th in the national final
- 1990 - Hallo Hallo sung by Lonnie Devantier, won the national final - finished 8th at the Eurovision Song Contest in Zagreb
- 1990 - Kender du typen sung by Käte & Per, finished 5th in the national final
- 1991 - Din musik min musik sung by Birthe Kjær, finished 3rd in the national final
- 1991 - Casino sung by Pernille Petterson, finished 6th in the national final
- 1991 - Du er musikken i mit liv' sung by Annette Heick & Egil Eldøen, finished 4th in the national final
- 1992 - Det vil vi da blæse på sung by himself as Sweet Keld & the Hilda Hearts, finished 5th in the national final
- 1993 - Under stjernerne på himlen sung by Tommy Seebach, won the national final - finished 22nd at the Eurovision Song Contest in Millstreet
- 1996 - Kun med dig sung by Dorthe Andersen and Martin Loft, won the national final, but didn't however qualify for the Eurovision Song Contest in Oslo.

Heick submitted three other songs in 1993, 1996 and 1999 but they failed to get to the national final.
