= Annette Heick =

Annette Vollmer Heick (born 12 November 1971) is a Danish television personality, journalist, singer and cartoon voice actress. She is the daughter of the entertainers Keld and Hilda Heick.

== Career ==
Her journalistic career started in 1987, where she was employed by BT. Following this, she has been employed by Se og Hør and Ekstra Bladet.

As a singer, she and Tommy Seebach had a big hit in 1987 with Du skælder mig hele tiden ud. In October 2005, her debut solo album, Right Time, was released.

She has worked as a television presenter on DR, TV 2, TV Danmark.

In her career as a voice actress, she has provided the Danish voices to numerous cartoon characters, including Daisy Duck in House of Mouse, Douglas in Lloyd in Space, Princess Atta in Pixar's movie A Bug's Life, Shego in Kim Possible and Sandy Cheeks in SpongeBob SquarePants.

Annette Heick did also play Glinda in Det Ny Teater's production of Wicked (musical) in 2010/11 alongside Maria Lucia Rosenberg as Elphaba. In 2020, Annette played Donna Sheridan (Danish: Donna Svendsen) in the revival of Mamma Mia (musical) in Tivoli's concert hall.
