= Sir Henry and his Butlers =

Sir Henry and his Butlers was a Danish rock-pop group which was formed during the summer of 1964 in Copenhagen, Denmark. The group is mostly known for its two front figures Ole "Sir Henry" Bredahl and especially Tommy Seebach and also the song "Let's Go". Characteristic for the group has been Ole Bredahl as organiser, whereas the rest of the ensemble of Sir Henry and his Butlers have been changed many times since the creation of the group.

== History ==
The band is a continuation of another band called Five Danes which was dissolved in the spring of 1964. In the beginning, this new band consisted of Ole "Sir Henry" Bredahl (vocals, bass) and Carsten Elgstrøm (guitar), together with Leif Davidsen (drums). As a trio, they participated in a The Danish Beatles competition in Holte Hallen in April 1964. Shortly thereafter, the band was expanded with Poul Petersen (guitar) and Leif Davidsen was replaced with Jens Bøgvad, former the Flintones. The group became popular around the Copenhagen music venues, in particular at Bakkens Place Pigalle where they played as house orchestra. This was a result of their single debut "Hi-Heel Sneakers"/"Sick and Tired" from 1964. In October 1964 guitarist Poul Petersen was replaced by Arne Schrøder. During the autumn of the same year, the band got their breakthrough with the release of their second single, "Let's Go" (B-side: "Johnny Be Good (By By Johnny)") on the Sonet label. The single became a hit, not only in Denmark, but also in Sweden and Norway, and the sale of the single exceeded 50,000 copies.

In January 1965, Sir Henry and his Butlers expanded the band (Ole Bredahl, Torben Sardorf, Arne Schrøder) with Tommy Seebach (organ and, vocals), who at the time was only 15 years old. He would become very popular and together with Ole Bredahl they made up the front figures of the band. The same year the band changed record label to EMI and achieved a number of hits, among others: Times Are Getting Hard, Beautiful Brown Eyes and "Marianne", which were all released in 1966. During the autumn of 1967, the single "Camp" was released and became an international hit, especially in Germany, the Netherlands and Belgium. The song was an instrumental track where the main instrument was the comb and paper. It was later used in an advertisement for the chocolate Rolo. The distinctly odd B-side song, "Pretty Style", featured sitar and psychedelic multi-tracked guitar and vocals.

During the years after Tommy Seebach joined the group the band changed its style. Originally their music was replicas of English beat music but this changed to a more original pop sound with songs that were composed by the members of the band themselves, primarily Ole Bredahl and Tommy Seebach. This new musical style ended up becoming an LP which was released in 1968 with the name H2O. In 1970, the band's name was shortened to Sir Henry. Two years later, Ole Steen Nielsen was replaced by Claus Asmussen, former The Noblemen and later Shu-bi-dua. This constellation recorded and released the 10-year anniversary album Listen in 1973.

Ole Bredahl and Tommy Seebach decided in 1975 to reorganise the group together with Torben Johansen (guitar) and John Roger (drums); the latter was a former member of Teenmakers. The same year, the four recorded the album Flashback. During that year, Tommy Seebach began a solo career which would become very successful. Due to that success, Tommy Seebach chose to leave the group in 1977. The same year, Ole Bredahl recorded a solo LP with the title of Tivoli/O. Henry on which there are feature some of the popular Sir Henry songs. The success was not on the same scale as for Tommy Seebach. Following this, Sir Henry was re-established several times by Ole Bredahl but without major success, though they had a minor hit in 1980 with the song "Juicy Lucy", where Sir Henry consisted of Ole Bredahl, Søren Bundgård (keyboard), Kurt Bo Jensen (guitar) and Ole Carsten Juul (drums) (was later replaced by Sten Kristensen in 1983). At the Dansk Melodi Grand Prix in 1983, they participated as backing group for Kirsten Siggaard with the song "Og livet går". The next year, Søren Bundgård and Kirsten Siggaard again participated in the Danish Melodi Grand Prix as the duo Hot Eyes with the song "Det' Lige Det", with which they won. The same year, Sir Henry (and his Butlers) was dissolved.

== Discography ==
=== Singles ===
- 1965: Eve of Destruction / It Keeps Raining - Columbia DD 770
- 1966: Beautiful Brown Eyes / Jenny Take a Ride! - Columbia DD780
- 1968: Camp / Pretty Style - Metronome M25022 - AUS #25
- ?: Mr. Joyful / Sweet Dreams (Of You) - Columbia (Denmark) C006-37069
