= Natteravn =

2010 single by Rasmus Seebach

Single by Rasmus Seebach

from the album Rasmus Seebach
- Released: April 2010 (Denmark); May 12, 2010 (Sweden)
- Recorded: 2009
- Genre: Pop
- Length: 3:58
- Label: Universal Music
- Songwriter(s): Rasmus Seebach, Nicolai Seebach, Jinks

Rasmus Seebach singles chronology
"Lidt i fem" (2010)	"Natteravn" (2010)	"I mine øjne" (2011)

Music video
- "Natteravn" on YouTube

"Natteravn" (lit. 'Night Raven', "night owl, wanderer in the night") is a pop song recorded by Danish singer Rasmus Seebach taken from his debut album by the same name. It was released as the album's fourth single in Denmark. The song was a huge success in Sweden in June 2010, peaking high on the Swedish Spotify Chart and peaking at #4 at Sverigetopplistan, the official chart.

== Charts and Sales ==
=== Weekly charts ===
Chart (2009–2010)	Peak position
Denmark (Tracklisten)	14
Norway (VG-lista)	11
Sweden (Sverigetopplistan)	4

=== Year-end charts ===
Chart (2010)	Position
Sweden (Sverigetopplistan)	13

== Certifications ==
Sales certifications for Natteravn
Region	Certification	Certified units/sales
Denmark (IFPI Danmark)	Platinum	90,000^{‡}
Norway (IFPI Norway)	3× Platinum	30,000^{*}
Sweden (GLF)	4× Platinum	160,000^{‡}
^{*} Sales figures based on certification alone.^{‡} Sales+streaming figures based on certification alone.

== "Calling (Nighthawk)" ==
"Calling (Nighthawk)"

Single by Rasmus Seebach
- Released: 2011
- Recorded: 2010
- Genre: Pop
- Label: Universal Music
- Songwriter(s): Rasmus Seebach, Nicolai Seebach, Jinks

"Calling (Nighthawk)", the English language version of "Natteravn" was released elsewhere and became a minor hit for Seebach in Germany reaching #90 in the German Singles Chart.

Chart (2011)	Peak position
Germany (GfK)	90
