= Julie Maria =

Danish singer and songwriter

- Born: Julie Maria Barkou; 30 May 1981 (age 45); Copenhagen, Denmark
- Years active: 2004–
- Labels: 2004–2007; Universal Music Group; 2007– Playground Music Denmark

Julie Maria Barkou (born 30 May 1981 in Copenhagen), also known as Julie Maria, is a Danish singer and songwriter, who has produced four long play albums to date with Beautiful Minor being her debut album in 2004.

In October 2012, Julie Maria released her fourth studio album Kom with "Ude af mig selv" and "Beat" as supporting singles.

Collaborations

She sang a duet with Danish singer Steffen Brandt "Et lykkeligt goodbye" which can be found on TV·2's album (2005).

== Discography ==
=== Albums ===
- 2004: Beautiful Minor
- 2007: På kanten af virkeligheden
- 2009: Yaguar
- 2012: Kom

=== EPs ===
- 2008: På vej ud over kanten (Remix EP)
- 2011: Syv sange
