= Dansk Melodi Grand Prix =

Annual music competition, Danish Eurovision Song Contest preselection

- Genre: Various
- Location: Denmark
- Years active: 1957–1966; 1978–present
- Founders: DR
- Website: Official website

Dansk Melodi Grand Prix (pronounced [ˈtænˀsk me̝loˈti kʁɑn ˌpʰʁi]), also known as Melodi Grand Prix or simply DMGP, is an annual music competition organised by the Danish public broadcaster DR since 1957, which determines its entry for the Eurovision Song Contest. The festival has produced three Eurovision winners and fourteen top-five placings.

== History ==
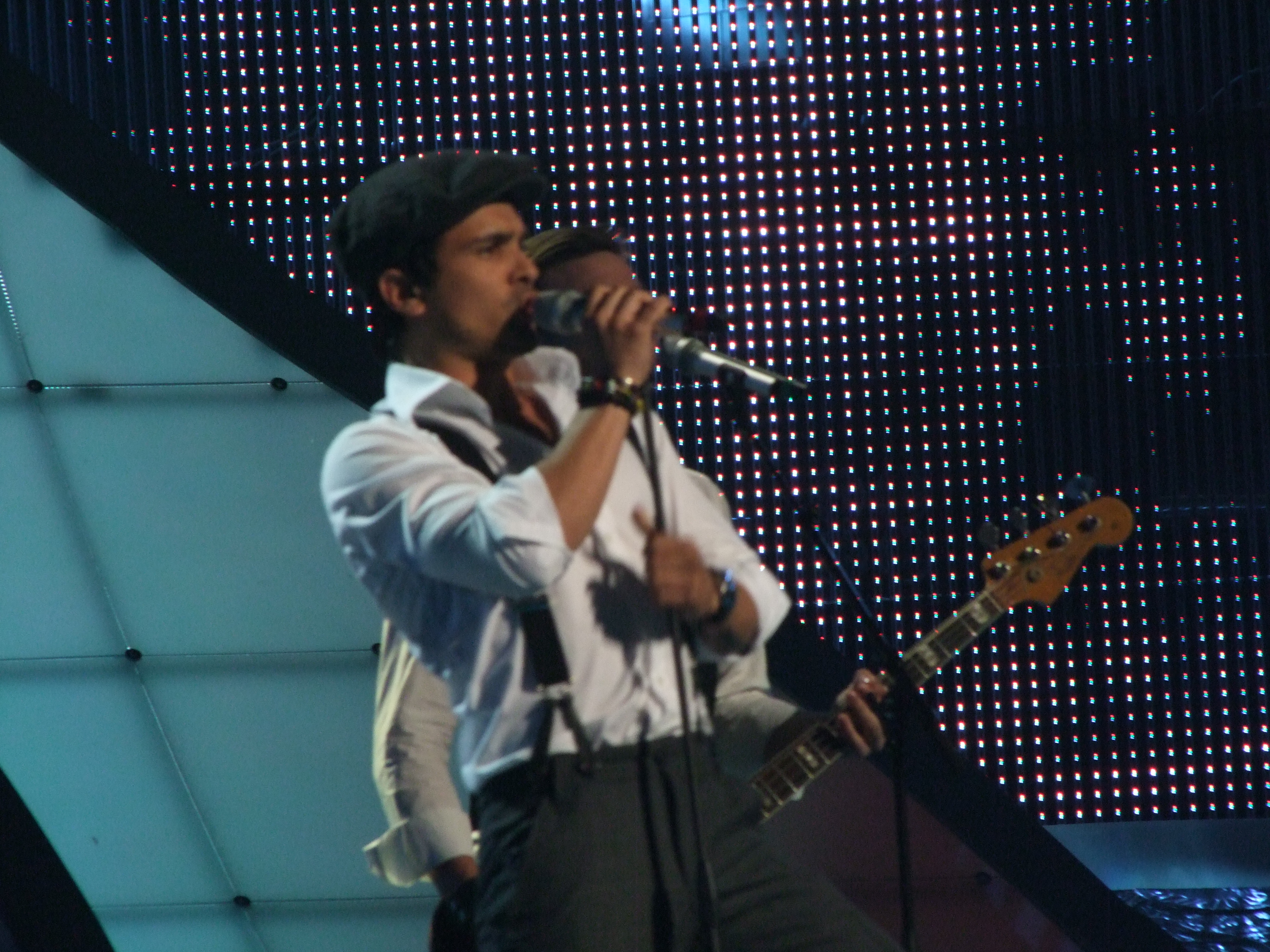
Simon Mathew performing at the Eurovision Song Contest 2008

With the introduction of a semi-final at the 2004 contest, and due to Denmark's absence from the 2003 contest, Denmark's 2004 representative, Tomas Thordarson, had to take part in the semi-final. His song, "Shame on You" did not reach the final, finishing 13th in a field of 22 contestants.

In 2005, DR made a bold step for Dansk Melodi Grand Prix. Artists were allowed, for the first time ever, to sing in a language other than Danish. Many of the entries that year were sung in English; however, against the odds, the winning song was sung in Danish. Jakob Sveistrup won Dansk Melodi Grand Prix with his song "Tænder på dig". It was later re-written for the Eurovision Song Contest 2005 to English as "Talking to You". Unlike the year before, Denmark secured a place in the final, finishing third in the semifinal. In the final he came 9th, guaranteeing Denmark a place in the final of the 2006 contest. A year later, Sidsel Ben Semmane sang "Twist of Love" in the final, but managed to finish 18th of 24 songs.

In 2007, after many poor results, Dansk Melodi Grand Prix adopted a semi-final format that had served well for the Swedish preselection, Melodifestivalen. Two semi-finals with 8 songs each were introduced, with the top 4 songs qualifying for the final. The 4 losing songs of each semi-final then took part in one of two wildcard rounds where the listeners of Danish radio stations P3 and P4 chose another two finalists. The winner under this new format, DQ with the song "Drama Queen" (a wildcard entrant), finished 18th in the semifinal, failing to qualify Denmark for the final again.

DR continued to use this format in the 2008 edition which was won by Simon Mathew and the song "All Night Long". At the Eurovision Song Contest 2008 in Belgrade, Serbia, Denmark as in 2005, finished 3rd in the semifinals, qualifying for the grand final. In the final, Mathew got 60 points, finishing 15th in a field of 25 songs.

For the 2009 of Dansk Melodi Grand Prix, DR reverted to their one-night final, that was held on 31 January 2009. The final of 10 songs consisted of 6 songs from an open call of songs from the public, with 4 songs being invited by DR to compete.

== Winners ==
Almost all winners of Dansk Melodi Grand Prix have gone on to represent Denmark at Eurovision, with two exceptions: the 1996 winner, "Kun med dig" by Dorte Andersen and Martin Loft, which failed to qualify from the Eurovision pre-selection, and the 2020 winner, "Yes" by Ben and Tan, which was slated to be the country's entry before the contest was cancelled due to the COVID-19 pandemic. Denmark has won Eurovision three times: in 1963, 2000 and 2013.

Table key
1	Winner
2	Second place
3	Third place
◁	Last place
X	Entry selected but did not compete
†	Upcoming

Year	Host city and venue	Date	Song	Artist	Songwriter(s)	Eurovision placing
1957	Copenhagen (Radiohuset)	17 February	"Skibet skal sejle i nat"	Birthe Wilke and Gustav Winckler	Erik Fiehn, Poul Sørensen	3
1958	Copenhagen (Radiohuset)	16 February	"Jeg rev et blad ud af min dagbog"	Raquel Rastenni	Sven Ulrik, Harry Jensen	8
1959	Copenhagen (Radiohuset)	11 February	"Uh, jeg ville ønske jeg var dig"	Birthe Wilke	Otto Lington, Carl Andersen	5
1960	Copenhagen (Radiohuset)	4 March	"Det var en yndig tid"	Katy Bødtger	Vilfred Kjær, Sven Buemann	10
1961	Fredericia (Fredericia Teater)	19 February	"Angelique"	Dario Campeotto	Aksel V. Rasmussen	5
1962	Copenhagen (Tivolis Koncertsal)	9 February	"Vuggevise"	Ellen Winther	Kjeld Bonfils, Sejr Volmer-Sørensen	10
1963	Copenhagen (Tivolis Koncertsal)	24 February	"Dansevise"	Grethe and Jørgen Ingmann	Otto Francker, Sejr Volmer-Sørensen	1
1964	Copenhagen (Tivolis Koncertsal)	15 February	"Sangen om dig"	Bjørn Tidmand	Aksel V. Rasmussen, Mogens Dam	9
1965	Copenhagen (Radiohuset) (internal selection)	18 February	"For din skyld"	Birgit Brüel	Jørgen Jersild, Poul Henningsen	7
1966	Copenhagen (Tivolis Koncertsal)	6 February	"Stop - mens legen er go'"	Ulla Pia	Erik Kåre	14
1978	Copenhagen (Tivolis Koncertsal)	25 February	"Boom Boom"	Mabel	Peter Nielsen, Andy Kulmbak, Michael Trempenau, Christian Have	16
1979	Søborg (TV-Byen)	3 February	"Disco Tango"	Tommy Seebach	Tommy Seebach, Keld Heick	6
1980	Copenhagen (Falkoner Center)	29 March	"Tænker altid på dig"	Bamses Venner	Bjarne Gren Jensen, Flemming Jørgensen	14
1981	Copenhagen (Valencia)	28 February	"Krøller eller ej"	Tommy Seebach and Debbie Cameron	Tommy Seebach, Keld Heick	11
1982	Søborg (TV-Byen)	13 March	"Video, Video"	Brixx	Jens Brixtofte	17
1983	Søborg (TV-Byen)	5 March	"Kloden drejer"	Gry Johansen	Flemming Gernyx, Lars Christensen, Christian Jacobsen, Billy Cross	17
1984	Søborg (TV-Byen)	18 February	"Det' lige det"	Kirsten and Søren	Søren Bundgaard, Keld Heick	4
1985	Lyngby (ASA Filmudlejning)	9 March	"Sku' du spørg' fra no'en?"	Kirsten and Søren	Søren Bundgaard, Keld Heick	11
1986	Søborg (TV-Byen)	22 February	"Du er fuld af løgn"	Lise Haavik	John Hatting	6
1987	Copenhagen (Tivolis Koncertsal)	28 February	"En lille melodi"	Anne-Cathrine Herdorf	Helge Engelbrecht, Jacob Jonia	5
1988	Søborg (TV-Byen)	27 February	"Ka' du se hva' jeg sa'?"	Kirsten and Søren	Søren Bundgaard, Keld Heick	3
1989	Copenhagen (Bella Center)	25 March	"Vi maler byen rød"	Birthe Kjær	Søren Bundgaard, Keld Heick	3
1990	Copenhagen (Tivolis Koncertsal)	24 March	"Hallo Hallo"	Lonnie Devantier	John Hatting, Torben Lendager, Keld Heick	8
1991	Aarhus (Musikhuset)	16 March	"Lige der hvor hjertet slår"	Anders Frandsen	Michael Elo	19
1992	Aalborg (Aalborghallen)	29 February	"Alt det som ingen ser"	Kenny Lübcke and Lotte Nilsson	Carsten Warming	12
1993	Odense (Odense Congress Center)	3 April	"Under stjernerne på himlen"	Tommy Seebach Band	Tommy Seebach, Keld Heick	22
1995	Søborg (TV-Byen)	25 March	"Fra Mols til Skagen"	Aud Wilken	Lise Cabble, Mette Mathiesen	5
1996	Søborg (TV-Byen)	9 March	"Kun med dig"	Dorte Andersen and Martin Loft	Jascha Richter, Keld Heick	DNQ X
1997	Søborg (TV-Byen)	1 March	"Stemmen i mit liv"	Kølig Kaj	Lars Pedersen, Thomas Lægård	16
1999	Søborg (TV-Byen)	13 March	"Denne gang"	Michael Teschl and Trine Jepsen	Ebbe Ravn	8 (Note: Performed at Eurovision as "This Time I Mean It")
2000	Copenhagen (Cirkusbygningen)	19 February	"Smuk som et stjerneskud"	Olsen Brothers	Jørgen Olsen	1 (Note: Performed at Eurovision as "Fly on the Wings of Love")
2001	Herning (Messecenter Herning)	17 February	"Der står et billede af dig på mit bord"	Rollo and King	Søren Poppe, Thomas Brekling, Stefan Teilmann Laub Nielsen	2 (Note: Performed at Eurovision as "Never Ever Let You Go")
2002	Copenhagen (Cirkusbygningen)	9 February	"Vis mig hvem du er"	Malene Mortensen	Michael Ronson	24 (Note: Performed at Eurovision as "Tell Me Who You Are") ◁
2004	Aarhus (Atletion)	7 February	"Sig det' løgn"	Tomas Thordarson	Ivar Lind Greiner, Iben Plesner	DNQ (Note: Performed at Eurovision as "Shame on You")
2005	Horsens (Forum Horsens)	12 February	"Tænder på dig"	Jakob Sveistrup	Andreas Mørck, Jacob Launbjerg	9 (Note: Performed at Eurovision as "Talking to You")
2006	Aalborg (Gigantium)	11 February	"Twist of Love"	Sidsel Ben Semmane	Niels Drevsholt	18
2007	Holstebro (Musikteatret; semi-final 1); Aalborg (Aalborghallen; semi-final 2); Horsens (Forum Horsens; final)	10 February	"Drama Queen"	DQ	Simon Munk, Peter Andersen, Claus Christensen	DNQ
2008	Copenhagen (DR Byen; semi-finals); Horsens (Forum Horsens; final)	2 February	"All Night Long"	Simon Mathew	Jacob Launbjerg, Svend Gudiksen, Nis Bøgvad	15
2009	Herning (Messecenter Herning)	31 January	"Believe Again"	Niels Brinck	Lars Halvor Jensen, Martin Møller Larsson, Ronan Keating	13
2010	Aalborg (Gigantium)	6 February	"In a Moment Like This"	Chanée and N'evergreen	Thomas G:son, Henrik Sethsson, Erik Bernholmis	4
2011	Ballerup (Ballerup Super Arena)	26 February	"New Tomorrow"	A Friend in London	Lise Cabble, Jakob Glæsner	5
2012	Aalborg (Gigantium)	21 January	"Should've Known Better"	Soluna Samay	Remee, Chief 1, Amir Sulaiman, Isam Bachiri	23
2013	Herning (Jyske Bank Boxen)	26 January	"Only Teardrops"	Emmelie de Forest	Lise Cabble, Julia Fabrin Jakobsen, Thomas Stengaard	1
2014	Odense (Arena Fyn)	8 March	"Cliché Love Song"	Basim	Lasse Lindorff, Kim Nowak-Zorde, Daniel Fält	9
2015	Aalborg (Gigantium)	7 February	"The Way You Are"	Anti Social Media	Remee S. Jackman, Chief 1	DNQ
2016	Horsens (Forum Horsens)	13 February	"Soldiers of Love"	Lighthouse X	Sebastian F. Ovens, Daniel Lund Jørgensen, Katrine Klith Andersen, Søren Bregendal, Johannes Nymark, Martin Skriver	DNQ
2017	Herning (Jyske Bank Boxen)	25 February	"Where I Am"	Anja Nissen	Anja Nissen, Angel Tupai, Michael D'Arcy	20
2018	Aalborg (Gigantium)	10 February	"Higher Ground"	Rasmussen	Niclas Arn, Karl Eurén	9
2019	Herning (Jyske Bank Boxen)	23 February	"Love Is Forever"	Leonora	Lise Cabble, Melanie Wehbe, Emil Lei	12
2020	Copenhagen (Royal Arena)	7 March	"Yes"	Ben and Tan	Emil Rosendal Lei, Jimmy Jansson, Linnea Deb	Cancelled X
2021	Copenhagen (DR Byen)	6 March	"Øve os på hinanden"	Fyr og Flamme	Laurits Emanuel	DNQ
2022	Herning (Jyske Bank Boxen)	5 March	"The Show"	Reddi	Chief 1, Ihan Haydar, Julia Fabrin, Remee Jackman, Siggy Savery	DNQ
2023	Næstved (Næstved Arena)	11 February	"Breaking My Heart"	Reiley	Bård Mathias Bonsaksen, Hilda Stenmalm, Rani Petersen, Sivert Hjeltnes Hagtvet	DNQ
2024	Copenhagen (DR Koncerthuset)	17 February	"Sand"	Saba	Jonas Thander, Melanie Wehbe, Pil Jeppesen	DNQ
2025	Herning (Jyske Bank Boxen)	1 March	"Hallucination"	Sissal	Linnea Deb, Melanie Wehbe, Malthe Johansen, Sissal Jóhanna Norðberg Niclasen, Chris Rohde-Frisk, Lina Spangsberg, Marcus Winther-John	23
2026	Frederikshavn (Arena Nord)	14 February	"Før vi går hjem"	Søren Torpegaard Lund	Clara Sofie Fabricius, Søren Torpegaard Lund, Thomas Meilstrup, Valdemar Littauer Bendixen	7
2027	Kolding (Sydbank Arena)	13 February	TBA	TBA	TBA	TBA

== Albums ==
=== Main album series ===
Year	Album	Peak positions	Weeks at #1	Certification
Year	Album	DEN	Weeks at #1	Certification
2015	Melodi Grand Prix 2015	7	N/A	

=== Children's MGP album series ===
Year	Album	Peak positions	Weeks at #1	Certification
Year	Album	DEN	Weeks at #1	Certification
2001	MGP 2001	1	3	
2002	MGP 2002	1	7	
2003	MGP 2003	1	4	
2004	MGP 2004	1	3	
2005	MGP 2005	1	3	
2006	MGP 2006	1	2	
2007	MGP 2007	1	4	
2008	MGP 2008: Det er bare noget, vi leger!	1	3	
2009	MGP 2009	1	2	
2011	MGP 2011	1	5	
2012	MGP 2012	1	6	
2013	MGP 2013	1	4	
2014	MGP 2014	1	8	
2015	MGP 2015	1	6	
2016	MGP 2016	1	2	
2017	MGP 2017	2	—	
2018	MGP 2018	1	2	
2019	MGP 2019	1	1	
2020	MGP 2020	2	—	
2021	MGP 2021	1	3	
2022	MGP 2022	1	1	
2023	MGP 2023	3	—	
2024	MGP 2024	1	3	
2025	MGP 2025	1	4	
2026	MGP 2026	1	1	

De vindere series

Year	Album	Peak positions
Year	Album	DEN
2004	MGP 2004 – De 3 vindere	11
2005	MGP 2005 – De 3 vindere	12
2006	MGP 2006 – De 3 vindere	11
2007	MGP 2006 – De 3 vindere	24
2008	MGP 2008 – Vinderne	33

Others

Year	Album	Peak positions
Year	Album	DEN
2014	MGP Jul	7

== See also ==
- Dansk Melodi Grand Prix winners
- Melodifestivalen
- Melodi Grand Prix
- Denmark in the Eurovision Song Contest
- MGP Junior (Denmark)
