= Under stjernerne på himlen =

1993 single by the Tommy Seebach Band

Single by Tommy Seebach Band
- Language: Danish
- Released: 1993
- Composer: Tommy Seebach
- Lyricist: Keld Heick

Eurovision Song Contest 1993 entry
- Country: Denmark
- Artist: Tommy Seebach Band
- Language: Danish
- Composer: Tommy Seebach
- Lyricist: Keld Heick
- Conductor: George Keller

Finals performance
- Final result: 22nd
- Final points: 9

Entry chronology
- ◄ "Alt det som ingen ser" (1992)
- "Fra Mols til Skagen" (1995) ►

"Under stjernerne på himlen" (Danish pronunciation: [ˈɔnˀɐ ˈstjɛɐ̯nɐnə pʰɔ ˈhe̝mln̩]; "Under the stars of the sky") is a song written by Tommy Seebach and performed by the Tommy Seebach Band. It was Denmark's entry in the Eurovision Song Contest 1993.

Seebach wrote the song as a lullaby to his daughter, and his family encouraged him to suggest it as a finalist for the Danish final in 1993, where it won. At the Eurovision Song Contest, the song was performed fifth on the night, following Switzerland's Annie Cotton with "Moi, tout simplement" and preceding Greece's Katerina Garbi with "Ellada, chora tou fotos". At the close of voting, it had received 9 points, placing 22nd in a field of 25.

The disappointing result at this contest, coupled with the expansion of the contest following the breakup of Yugoslavia and the Soviet Union, meant that Denmark was relegated from competing in the 1994 contest, causing them to miss a finale for the first time since 1977. The media reacted poorly to this, putting the blame on Seebach personally, which his son later revealed was one of the main reasons for his father's descent into alcoholism and depression, which led to his divorce and ultimately his early death ten years later. Although Seebach had overcome his alcoholism by this time, there was already permanent damage to his heart, which led to the deadly heart attack in 2003. "Under stjernerne på himlen" was played at Seebach's funeral, as the coffin was carried out of the church.

It was succeeded as Danish representative at the 1995 contest (to which Denmark had been invited) by Aud Wilken with "Fra Mols til Skagen".

== Certifications ==
Certifications for "Under stjernerne på himlen"
Region	Certification	Certified units/sales
Denmark (IFPI Danmark)	Gold	45,000^{‡}
^{‡} Sales+streaming figures based on certification alone.

== Rasmus Seebach version ==
"Under stjernerne på himlen"

Single by Rasmus Seebach

from the album Mer' end kærlighed
- Released: October 2011
- Recorded: 2011
- Genre: Pop
- Length: 2:53 (Album Version)
- Label: ArtPeople
- Songwriters: Tommy Seebach; Keld Heick

Rasmus Seebach singles chronology
"I mine øjne" (2011)	"Under stjernerne på himlen" (2011)	"Mer' end kærlighed" (2011)

Rasmus Seebach recorded a cover of his father's song. The track is included in Rasmus' second album Mer' end kærlighed and was released in October 2011 as a single reaching #3 in the Hitlisten, the Danish Singles Chart. It was certified 3× Platinum for the track and an additional Platinum for streaming.

=== Certifications ===
Certifications for "Under stjernerne på himlen"
Region	Certification	Certified units/sales
Denmark (IFPI Danmark)	5× Platinum	450,000^{‡}
Streaming
Denmark (IFPI Danmark)	Platinum	900,000^{†}
^{‡} Sales+streaming figures based on certification alone.^{†} Streaming-only figures based on certification alone.
