= Rasmus Seebach (album) =

Studio album by Rasmus Seebach
- Released: 28 September 2009
- Recorded: 2009
- Genre: Pop
- Length: 45:42
- Label: ArtPeople
- Producer: Rasmus Seebach

Rasmus Seebach chronology
Rasmus Seebach (2009)	Mer' end kærlighed (2011)

Rasmus Seebach is the debut solo music album by Danish singer, songwriter and music producer Rasmus Seebach. The highly successful album was released on ArtPeople record label on 28 September 2009. By May 2010 it had sold over 120,000 copies and was certified Platinum album. It was the 2nd best-selling album in Denmark in 2009 to the top selling Michael Jackson album The Collection, the best-selling album of 2010, the 7th best-selling album of 2011, the 17th best-selling album of 2012, the 47th best-selling album of 2013, the 81st best-selling album of 2014 and the 60th best-selling album of 2015.

== Track listing ==
No.	Title	Writer(s)	Length
1.	"Glad igen"	Rasmus Seebach, Nicolai Seebach, Jinks	3:39
2.	"Den anden side"	R. Seebach, N. Seebach, Jinks	3:28
3.	"Engel"	R. Seebach, N. Seebach	4:11
4.	"Lidt i fem"	R. Seebach, N. Seebach	3:43
5.	"Natten falder på"	R. Seebach, N. Seebach, Jinks	4:06
6.	"En skygge af dig selv"	R. Seebach, N. Seebach, Jinks	3:40
7.	"Under samme sol"	R. Seebach, N. Seebach, Vincent Pontare	3:11
8.	"Sig jeg skal"	R. Seebach, N. Seebach, Jinks, Wayne Hector	4:15
9.	"Til dig"	R. Seebach, N. Seebach, Jinks	3:22
10.	"Gi' slip"	R. Seebach, N. Seebach	3:27
11.	"Den jeg er"	R. Seebach	4:41
12.	"Natteravn (Rasmus Seebach vs. Providers) (bonus track)"	R. Seebach, N. Seebach, Jeppe Federspiel, Rasmus Stabell	3:59

Swedish track listing
No.	Title	Writer(s)	Length
1.	"Natteravn (Rasmus Seebach vs. Providers) (bonus track)"	R. Seebach, N. Seebach, Jeppe Federspiel, Rasmus Stabell	3:59
2.	"Glad igen"	Rasmus Seebach, Nicolai Seebach, Jinks	3:39
3.	"Den anden side"	R. Seebach, N. Seebach, Jinks	3:28
4.	"Engel"	R. Seebach, N. Seebach	4:11
5.	"Lidt i fem"	R. Seebach, N. Seebach	3:43
6.	"Natten falder på"	R. Seebach, N. Seebach, Jinks	4:06
7.	"En skygge af dig selv"	R. Seebach, N. Seebach, Jinks	3:40
8.	"Under samme sol"	R. Seebach, N. Seebach, Vincent Pontare	3:11
9.	"Sig jeg skal"	R. Seebach, N. Seebach, Jinks, Wayne Hector	4:15
10.	"Til dig"	R. Seebach, N. Seebach, Jinks	3:22
11.	"Gi' slip"	R. Seebach, N. Seebach	3:27
12.	"Den jeg er"	R. Seebach	4:41
Total length:			45:42

== Release history ==
Region	Date	Label	Format	Catalogue
Denmark	28 September 2009	ArtPeople	CD, digital download	
Sweden	17 May 2010	Universal Music	CD, digital download	UNI-0602527-44514

== Charts ==
The album was at the top of the Danish Albums Chart Tracklisten for a total of 25 weeks including 7 weeks in 2009 (weeks 43-44, 49-53) and 18 more weeks in 2010 (weeks 1-4, 7-9, 11-12, 17, 26-32, 35). It spent 104 weeks inside the chart's top 10 and a total of 224 weeks in the top 40.

Chart (2009)	Peak position
Danish Albums Chart	1
Swedish Albums Chart	10

== Certifications ==
Region	Certification	Certified units/sales
Denmark (IFPI Danmark)	16× Platinum	320,000^{‡}
Sweden (GLF)	Gold	20,000^{^}
^{^} Shipments figures based on certification alone.^{‡} Sales+streaming figures based on certification alone.
