= Rasmus Seebach =

Danish singer

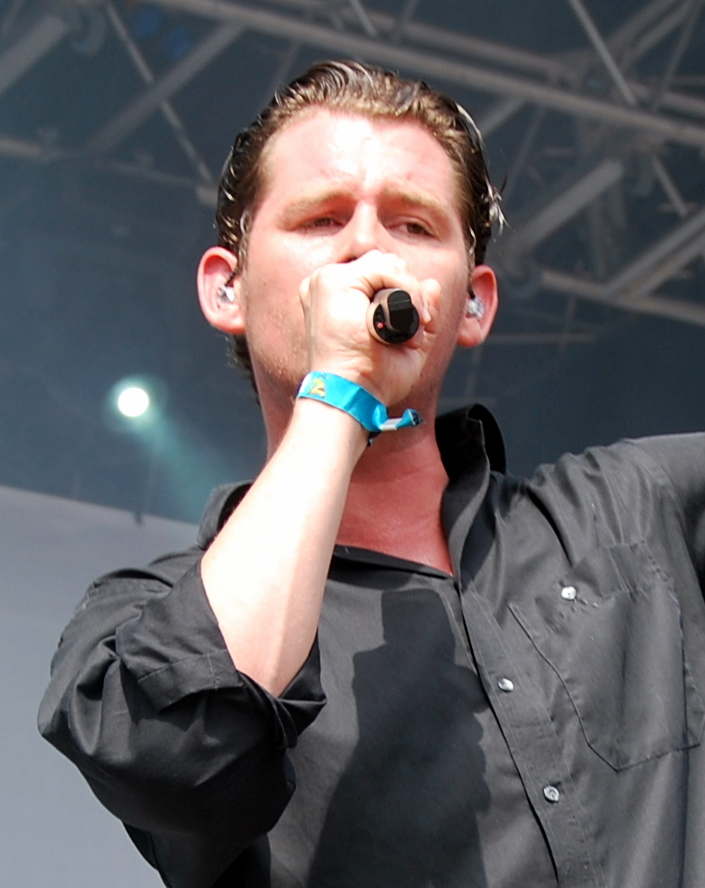
- Seebach in 2010

Background information
- Born: Rasmus Seebach Christensen; 28 March 1980 (age 46)
- Origin: Copenhagen, Denmark
- Genre: Pop
- Occupation: Singer
- Years active: 2009–present
- Labels: ArtPeople, sublicense Universal Music
- Website: rasmusseebach.dk

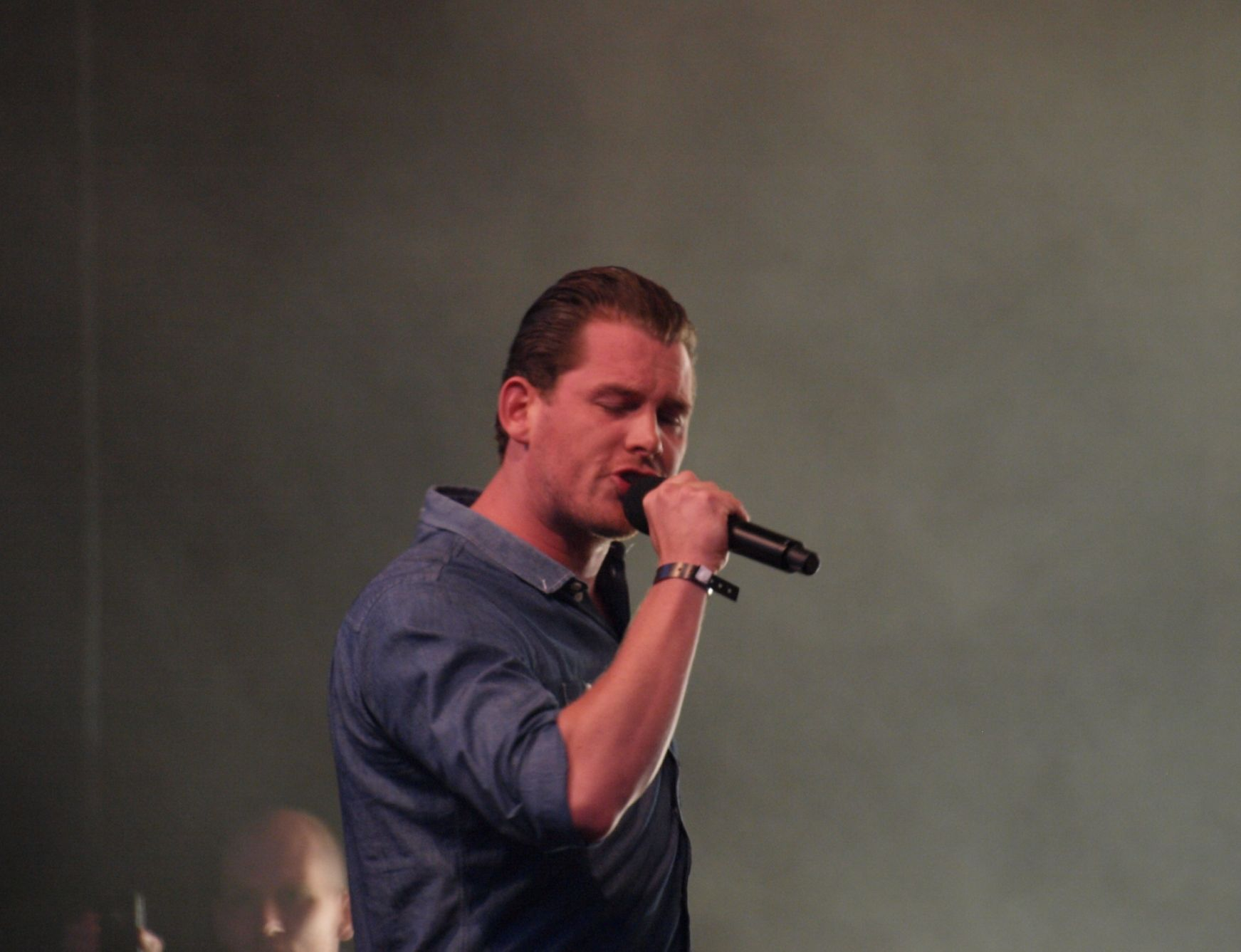
Seebach during a live concert

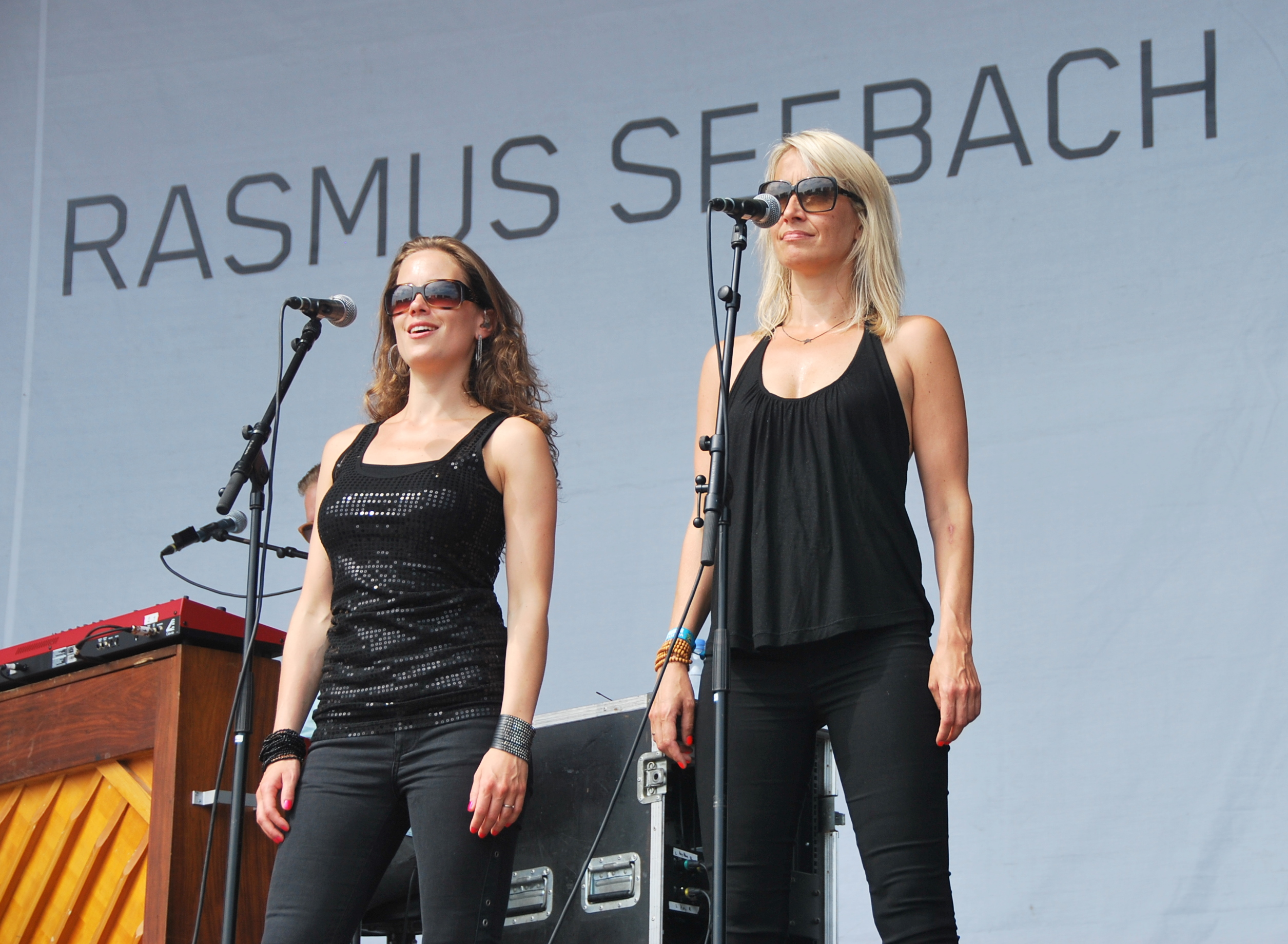
Seebach's backing vocalists in 2010

Rasmus Seebach (Danish: [ˈʁɑsmus ˈse̝ːpɑk]; born 28 March 1980) is a Danish singer-songwriter and record producer who had his solo-debut with the Danish-language single "Engel" (English: "Angel") in April 2009.

Seebach has written and produced songs for Danish and international artists since the late 1990s. Together with his brother, Nicolai Seebach, he runs the production company Top Notch Music. The two wrote the music for the charity song "Hvor små vi er" (English: "How small we are") for the victims of the 2004 Indian Ocean earthquake and tsunami.

His self-titled debut album consists of 12 tracks and was released on 28 September 2009, containing among others the singles "Engel" and "Glad igen" (English: "Happy again").

Rasmus Seebach is a son of Tommy Seebach, about whom he has also written a song, namely "Den jeg er" (English: "Who I am"). In the song, Rasmus tells his father that they have forgiven him and are doing fine, despite the father's alcoholism and sudden death. His brother Nicolai Seebach is also a well-known musician, songwriter and producer who co-writes most of Rasmus' materials.

In 2012 he recorded a duet version of "Say You, Say Me" with Lionel Richie which was featured on Richie's album Tuskegee.

== Discography ==
=== Albums ===
As G-Bach

- 1999: Skakmat

Solo

Title	Album details	Peak chart positions		Certification
Title	Album details	DEN	SWE	Certification
Rasmus Seebach	Released: 28 September 2009; Label: ArtPeople; Format: CD, digital download	1	10	IFPI DEN: 16× Platinum; GLF: Gold
Mer' end kærlighed	Released: 17 October 2011; Label: ArtPeople; Format: CD, digital download	1	19	IFPI DEN: 19× Platinum
Ingen kan love dig i morgen	Released: 4 November 2013; Label: ArtPeople; Format: CD, digital download	1	38	IFPI DEN: 18× Platinum
Verden ka' vente	Released: 6 November 2015; Label: ArtPeople; Format: CD, digital download	1	49	IFPI DEN: 12× Platinum
Før vi mødte dig	Released: 24 November 2017; Label: ArtPeople; Format: CD, digital download	1	—	IFPI DEN: 4× Platinum
Tak for turen: De første 10 år	Released: 8 November 2019; Label: Top Notch, Capitol, Universal; Format: CD, digital download, streaming	1	—	IFPI DEN: 2× Platinum

=== EPs ===
Title	EP details	Peak chart positions
Title	EP details	DEN
4 til gulvet	Released: 19 August 2022; Label: Top Notch, Capitol, Universal; Format: Digital download, streaming	8
Sange fra Askepot (Mine versioner)	Released: 23 February 2024; Label: Capitol, Universal; Format: Digital download, streaming	37

=== Singles ===
==== In Scandinavian countries ====
Year	Single	Peak chart positions			Certifications	Album
Year	Single	DEN	NOR	SWE	Certifications	Album
2009	"Engel"	1	—	12	IFPI DEN: 2× Platinum	Rasmus Seebach
2009	"Glad igen"	2	—	—	IFPI DEN: 2× Platinum	Rasmus Seebach
2009	"Den jeg er"	3	—	—		Rasmus Seebach
2010	"Lidt i fem"	3	—	—	IFPI DEN: Platinum	Rasmus Seebach
2010	"Natteravn"	14	5	4	IFPI DEN: Platinum; GLF: 4× Platinum; IFPI NOR: 3× Platinum	Rasmus Seebach
2011	"I mine øjne"	1	—	—	IFPI DEN: 2× Platinum	Mer' end kærlighed
2011	"Under stjernerne på himlen"	3	—	—	IFPI DEN: 4× Platinum	Mer' end kærlighed
2011	"Mer' end kærlighed"	22	—	—		Mer' end kærlighed
2011	"Millionær" (feat Ankerstjerne)	2	—	—	IFPI DEN: 3× Platinum	Mer' end kærlighed
2011	"Lys i din Lejlighed"	31	—	—	IFPI DEN: 2× Platinum	Mer' end kærlighed
2012	"Nangijala"	20	—	—	IFPI DEN: Platinum	Mer' end kærlighed
2012	"Falder"	19	—	—	IFPI DEN: 2× Platinum	Mer' end kærlighed
2013	"Olivia"	1	—	—	IFPI DEN: 4× Platinum	Ingen kan love dig i morgen
2013	"Fri"	3	—	—	IFPI DEN: Gold	Ingen kan love dig i morgen
2013	"Sandstorm"	1	—	—	IFPI DEN: 2× Platinum	Ingen kan love dig i morgen
2013	"Du' det dejligste"	7	—	—	IFPI DEN: Gold	Ingen kan love dig i morgen
2013	"Øde ø"	9	—	—	IFPI DEN: 6× Platinum	Ingen kan love dig i morgen
2013	"Ingen kan love dig i morgen"	20	—	—	IFPI DEN: 2× Platinum	Ingen kan love dig i morgen
2013	"Tusind farver"	27	—	—	IFPI DEN: 3× Platinum	Ingen kan love dig i morgen
2013	"I min T-shirt"	36	—	—	IFPI DEN: Platinum	Ingen kan love dig i morgen
2013	"Venner"	37	—	—	IFPI DEN: Gold	Ingen kan love dig i morgen
2015	"Uanset"	1	—	—	IFPI DEN: 3× Platinum	Verden ka' vente
2015	"Flyv fugl"	19	—	—	IFPI DEN: Platinum	Verden ka' vente
2015	"Lille store verden"	2	—	—	IFPI DEN: 3× Platinum	Verden ka' vente
2017	"2017"	1	—	—	IFPI DEN: Platinum	Før vi mødte dig
2017	"Bli' her lidt endnu"	4	—	—	IFPI DEN: Platinum	Før vi mødte dig
2017	"Farfar sang"	17	—	—	IFPI DEN: Gold	Før vi mødte dig
2019	"Lovesong"	3	—	—	IFPI DEN: Platinum	Tak for turen: De første 10 år
2019	"Beautiful"	17	—	—	IFPI DEN: Gold	Tak for turen: De første 10 år
2019	"Tak for turen"	26	—	—		Tak for turen: De første 10 år
2021	"Så længe vi danser"	10	—	—		Non-album singles
2022	"Livstegn"	20	—	—		Non-album singles
2022	"Vores år (Nytårssangen)"	36	—	—		Non-album singles
2025	"Sandheden" (with Artigeardit)	1	—	—	IFPI DEN: Gold	Non-album singles
2026	"Sprækker" (with Søn)	24	—	—		Non-album singles

==== Other countries ====
Year	Single	Peak chart positions	Album	Notes
Year	Single	GER	Album	Notes
2011	"Angel"	—		English language version of "Engel"
2011	"Calling (Nighthawk)"	90	Mer' end kærlighed	English language version of "Natteravn"
"—" means it did not chart.

==== Featured in ====
Year	Single	Peak chart positions	Certifications	Album
Year	Single	DEN	Certifications	Album
2011	"Fotografi af dig" (Ankerstjerne featuring Rasmus Seebach)	22	IFPI DEN: Gold	
2011	"1000 år" (Ankerstjerne featuring Rasmus Seebach)	7	IFPI DEN: Platinum	
2012	"Say You, Say Me" (Lionel Richie featuring Rasmus Seebach)	3	IFPI DEN: Gold	Lionel Richie album Tuskegee

=== Other charted songs ===
Year	Title	Peak chart positions	Certifications	Album
Year	Title	DEN	Certifications	Album
2015	"Verden ka' vente"	24	IFPI DEN: Platinum	Verden ka' vente
2015	"Livet går videre"	39	IFPI DEN: Gold	Verden ka' vente
2015	"Der' noget i december"	4	IFPI DEN: Platinum	Verden ka' vente
2022	"Zombie"	40		4 til gulvet
