= Gry Johansen =

Danish singer (born 1964)

Gry Johansen-Meilstrup (known as Gry) (born 28 August 1964) is a Danish singer who represented her country in Eurovision Song Contest 1983. She performed the song "Kloden drejer" ("The planet's spinning"). The song was placed seventeenth out of twenty. Johansen made further bids for Eurovision glory when she participated in the Danish national selection contests in 1985, 1989 and 2000. However, she won on none of those occasions.

Johansen, who was born in Copenhagen, had success in Germany together with German singer and producer Bernie Paul with whom she scored hits like "Our Love Is Alive", "Reach Out For The Stars" and with whom she recorded the album "Moments In Love". She called herself "Bo Andersen" for these releases. Gry has participated in several Danish TV shows as singer/musician.

Preceded by Brixx with Video, Video	Denmark in the Eurovision Song Contest; 1983	Succeeded by Hot Eyes with Det' lige det
