= Ataf Khawaja =

Danish rapper

Ataf Khawaja is a popular Danish rap artist, of Pakistani origin also known by the mononym Ataf. Ataf has also appeared in the television sitcom Klovn (2005) and the feature Halalabad Blues (2002).

== Biography ==
Ataf was involved in a youth hip-hop program in Tingbjerg, Denmark, which encourages immigrant teenagers to express themselves through music. When asked about his involvement in the program, Ataf said, "I want to show immigrant kids I'm evidence that you can make it happen. You don't have to be a cab driver...(or) a pizza delivery boy." His music has common themes about making the world a better, more accepting place. He charted on the Danish Singles Chart in 2004 with "Bare en thug" and released his album Paraderne nede in 2005.

== Discography ==
=== Albums ===
Album	Year	Peak chart positions	Certification
Album	Year	DEN	Certification
Paraderne nede	2005	23	

=== Singles ===
Single	Year	Peak chart positions	Album
Single	Year	DEN	Album
"Bare en thug"	2004	10	Paraderne nede

== Sources ==
- Asanovski, D.; Spellman, M. (2006), Danish Hip Hop and its Effect on Minority Youth in Denmark, Program Research Reports, Humanity in Action, archived from the original on 2006-10-22
