= Hot Eyes =

Danish singing duo

Hot Eyes Kirsten & Søren
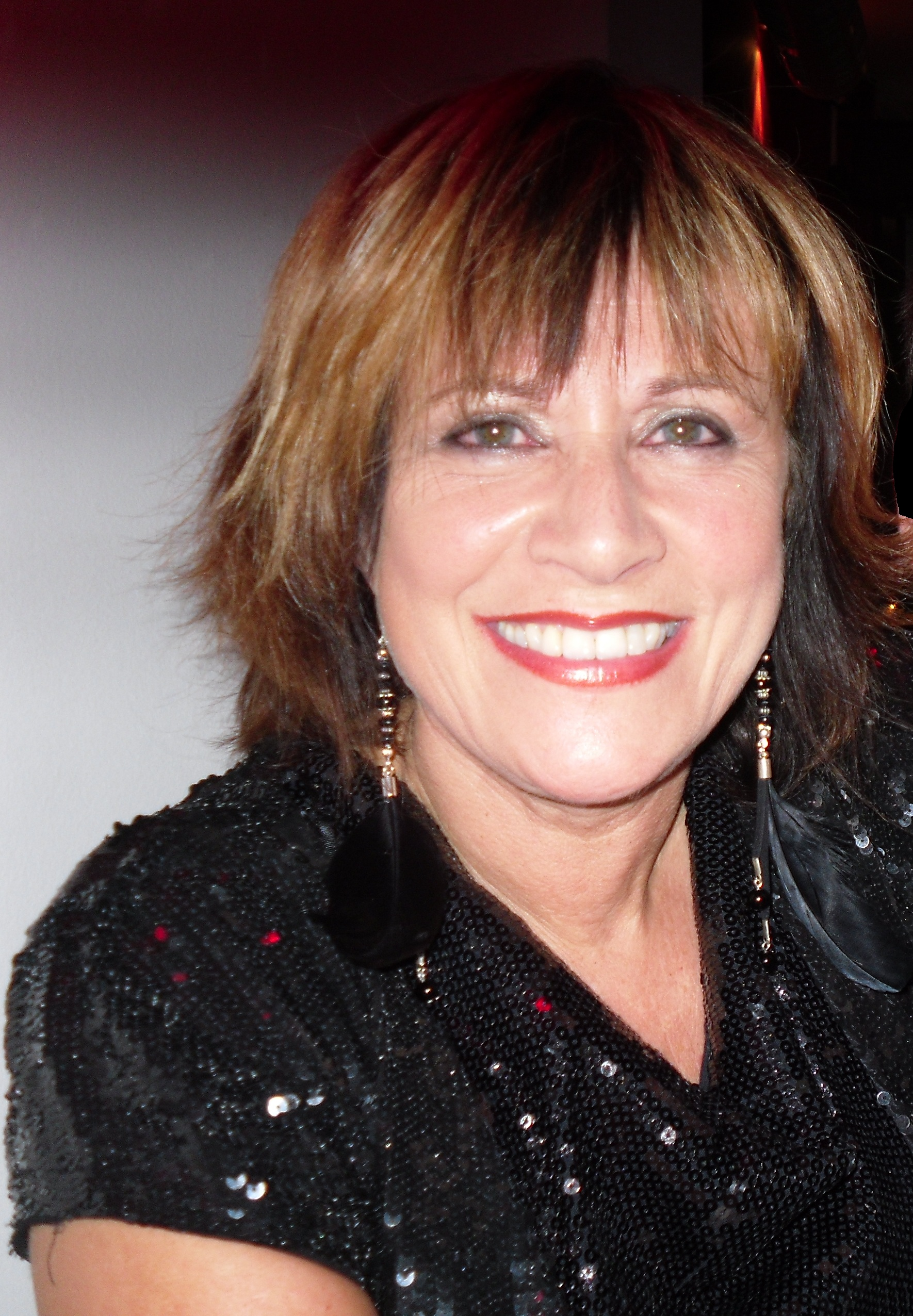
- Kirsten Siggaard in Stockholm 2010.
- Members: Kirsten Siggard; Søren Bundgaard

Kirsten & Søren, known internationally as Hot Eyes, were a Danish singing duo consisting of Kirsten Siggaard Andersen (born 7 September 1954 in Slagelse) and Søren Bundgaard Nielsen (born 4 March 1956 in Glostrup).

== Biography ==
Kirsten was brought up in a traditional Christian family who sang in a church choir when she was young and later pursued a career deemed appropriate and desirable, working in a bank, where she met her husband, Jorgen. Søren was a musician, singer and composer, at that time a member of the Danish band Sir Henry and his Butlers. Both Sir Henry and Kirsten entered the Dansk Melodi Grand Prix, which serves as the Danish pre-selection for the Eurovision Song Contest (ESC), in 1983. For some reason, Sir Henry's entry, "Og Livet går" with music composed by Søren and Leif Pedersen was disqualified and Kirsten took their place in the final, but in a somewhat consolation-prize style they sang as backing vocals for Kirsten. After the contest, Søren later decided to leave Sir Henry in favor of further cooperation with Kirsten, and the duo entered the Dansk MGP in 1984 as Hot Eyes with the song "Det' lige det" with music by Søren and lyrics by Keld Heick (who also penned lyrics to all other Hot Eyes' Dansk MGP entries). The song became known in Denmark as the "swimming pool song", as at the end of the Dansk MGP performance Kirsten threw Søren into a swimming pool by the stage. They won the contest and therefore represented Denmark at the Eurovision Song Contest 1984, taking the fourth place, even though they were unable to replicate the swimming pool gimmick. This was Denmark's best placing since 1963, when the country's entry won the contest. Kirsten was actually pregnant with her first son while singing at Eurovision. After the contest, Swedish singer Stefan Borsch recorded a Swedish version of the song called ”Det är ju dej jag går och väntar på”.

Riding on their popularity, they went on to win the Dansk MGP again in 1985 with "Sku' du spørg' fra no'en?" - the only ever second win in a row. It was only then that Kirsten decided to give up her work in the bank and embark on a full-time career in entertainment with Hot Eyes. The song was notable for featuring Søren's nine-year-old daughter, Lea Bundgaard, who played a vital role in the performance. This time, however, they took only eleventh place at the ESC.

In 1986 and 1987 Kirsten & Søren entered the Dansk MGP as well, but did not win, coming fourth with "Sig det, som det er" and fifth with "Farvel og Tak" respectively. In the meantime, Kirsten began her theatrical career, appearing in a theatre play as well as musicals such as Chess or Les Misérables.

1988 brought though was lucky for Hot Eyes, when their entry, "Ka' du se, hva' jeg sa'?" won the Dansk MGP again, making them record three-time winners of the contest (Tommy Seebach equalled this record in 1993). At the Eurovision Song Contest 1988 they also placed very favorably, coming third, which was Denmark's best placing in twenty five years. Kirsten was pregnant again (with her second son), but this time much more visibly - she gave birth only three weeks after the performance.

Even though the duo did not split officially until 1991, they did not record together after 1988. In 1989, Søren and Keld Heick wrote another song for the Dansk MGP together, but this time for Birthe Kjær, winning the contest again. They both appeared on stage as backing singers for Birthe, along with Lei and Lupe Moe, who supported no fewer than ten Danish ESC entries from 1981 to 2002. "Vi maler byen rød" came third again at the Eurovision. Søren also tried his luck as composer in the 1993 and 1999 Dansk MGP, but did not win, and currently runs a recording company called "SB Studio" in Aalborg.

Kirsten entered the Dansk MGP again in 1990 with "Inden Længe" by another composer and different in style, but failed to secure another ticket to Eurovision. The phone number viewers were using to vote for this song was later revealed to have had technical problems, though it was too late to do anything about it. In 1992, she formed a trio named "Swing Sisters" with opera singer Kirsten Vaupel and actor Lise-Lotte Norup, with whom she toured Denmark and several other European countries. She also performed with Søren on several special occasions later, reprising some of the Hot Eyes hits.

Kirsten's solo career has gone from strength to strength. Famous in Denmark for her award-winning portrayal of Édith Piaf in 1991. A new tour has been launched in January 2014 of a musical play called Spurven (the sparrow). The play focuses on the last 5 years of Piaf's life and starts at the time of the car crash that Piaf was involved in.

== Discography ==
=== Studio albums ===
- 1984: Hot Eyes
- 1985: Sku' du spørg' fra no'en
- 1986: 3
- 1988: Ka' du se hvad jeg sa'?

=== Singles ===
- 1983: "Det' lige det"
- 1984: "Tæl til ti"
- 1984: "Waiting in the Rain"
- 1985: "Sku' du spørg' fra no'en"
- 1985: "Den første gang"
- 1986: "Hvem var det nu du sa' du var?"
- 1986: "Sig det som det er"
- 1987: "Farvel og tak"
- 1988: "Ka' du se hva' jeg sa'?"

Awards and achievements
Preceded by Gry Johansen with Kloden drejer	Denmark in the Eurovision Song Contest; 1984, 1985	Succeeded by Lise Haavik with Du er fuld af løgn
Preceded by Anne-Cathrine Herdorf & Bandjo with En lille melodi	Denmark in the Eurovision Song Contest; 1988	Succeeded by Birthe Kjær with Vi maler byen rød
