= Nicolai Seebach =

Danish songwriter and music producer (born 1977)

Nicolai Seebach (born August 22, 1977) is a Danish songwriter and music producer.

== Career ==
He is the son of Tommy Seebach, a popular Danish singer, composer, organist, pianist and producer who died of a heart attack as 53-year-old. His younger brother Rasmus Seebach is also a famous singer, songwriter and producer. He also worked with Rasmus as a production team under various names including Seebach and Seebach, The Seebach Brothers and The RoofRaisers.

Since the late 1990s, he and his brother Rasmus have written and produced songs for both Danish and foreign artists through their production company Top Notch Music and has worked with local artists like Jokeren, Natasja, B-Boys, Infernal as well as international artists David Bisbal (Spain) and Big Brovas (UK).

In 1999 Nicolai and Rasmus issued a hip hop album under the name G-Bach. The album was entitled Skakmat (meaning Checkmate in Danish). In 2005 they wrote the music for the charity song "Hvor små vi er" to benefit victims of the tsunami victims in the Indian Ocean.

He co-wrote 11 of the 12 songs on Rasmus' multi-platinum-selling debut self-titled album Rasmus Seebach released in 2009 with phenomenal success. On Rasmus's 2011 follow-up album Mer' end kærlighed, Nicolai co-wrote also 11 of the 12 songs on the album.
