= Ankerstjerne =

Danish rapper

- Also known as: Jinks
- Born: Lars Ankerstjerne Christensen; 15 August 1984 (age 42)
- Origin: Hundige, Denmark
- Genres: Pop rap; urban
- Occupations: Rapper; singer; songwriter; record producer
- Years active: 2007 – present
- Label: ArtPeople

Lars Ankerstjerne Christensen, better known as Ankerstjerne (born on 15 August 1984), is a Danish rapper, singer, and record producer from Hundige. From 2007 to 2010, the rapper was known as Jinks, but returned to using his birth name Lars Ankerstjerne with the release of his self-titled album Ankerstjerne.

== Jinks ==
Lars Ankerstjerne debuted in 2007 under the pseudonym Jinks signed on Nexus Music record label. He became known for the single "One Night" by Jinks featuring Billy Beautiful which was used for the soundtrack of the 2007 youth movie Rich Kids.

His charting solo success was "Yo-Yo Pt. 2", a joint 2009 single credited to Joey Moe, Jinks, Nik & Jay. It reached No. 11 in the Danish Singles Chart. His single "Pssst! (Det på mode at være grim)" did not chart. Other notable songs from this period included "[Dai] to the Beat" and "In the [Hæd]" (2009) and "Orn'li!" (2010)

Jinks was also known for a number of collaborations with other artists related to the Nexus label. These included in addition to Nik & Jay and Joey Moe, Aligator and ChriZ. In 2007, he was featured in Joey Moe's "If I Want To". Joey Moe's 2010 single "Det går ned i nat" featuring Jinks reached No. 28 in the Danish Singles Chart, Alligator's 2010 hit "Gi' det til dig" also featuring Jinks reached No. 33 and ChriZ's 2010 hit "Lighters Up" featuring both Joey Moe and Jinks reached No. 16.

== Lars Ankerstjerne ==
Lars Ankerstjerne broke with Nexus and decided to join ArtPeople. In May 2011 the release of the single "Tag hvad du vil" (meaning Take what you want in Danish), a joint effort credited to Ankerstjerne and Burhan G became his best-selling single reaching No. 2 in June 2011 on the Danish Singles Chart. The single went platinum with 30,000 downloads.

The single was the precursor for Lars Ankerstjerne's self-titled debut album Ankerstjerne, released on 10 October 2011 with Artpeople. The album was produced in collaboration with Burhan G, who contributes three songs on the album. Other collaborations include Rasmus Seebach, Xander, Alberte and Sarah West. With the release of the album, Ankerstjerne released the same month his follow-up single to "Tag hvad du vil" entitled "Nattog" hitting the top ten. The vocal chorus is sung by Peter Bjørnskov.

== As songwriter ==
As a songwriter, Lars Ankerstjerne has written songs for Nik & Jay, Burhan G and Rasmus Seebach. He co-wrote 6 of the 12 songs on Seebach's multi-platinum-selling debut self-titled album Rasmus Seebach from 2009. He was credited as Jinks on the album. On Seebach's follow-up album Mer' end kærlighed in 2011, he co-wrote 11 of the 12 songs on the album. On this album, he is credited as Lars Ankerstjerne.

Ankerstjerne is also featured in Seebach's 2011 song, "Millionær" on the Seebach Mer' end kærlighed album.

== Discography ==
=== Albums ===
As Lars Ankerstjerne / Ankerstjerne

Title	Album details	Peak chart positions	Certification
Title	Album details	DEN	Certification
Ankerstjerne	Released: 10 October 2011; Label: ArtPeople; Format: CD, Digital download	6	
For os	Released: 2015; Label: ArtPeople; Format: CD, digital download	7	

=== Extended plays ===
Title	Details	Peak chart positions	Certification
Title	Details	DEN	Certification
Rapper	Released: 28 September 2016; Label: ArtPeople; Format: Digital download	14	

=== Singles ===
All peak positions in parentheses on the Danish Singles Chart

As Jinks

Year	Single	Peak chart positions	Album
Year	Single	DEN	Album
2009	"Yo-Yo Pt. 2" (Joey Moe, Jinks, Nik & Jay)	11	
2010	"Pssst! (Det på mode at være grim)" (Jinks)	–	

As Lars Ankerstjerne / Ankerstjerne

Year	Single	Peak chart positions	Album
Year	Single	DEN	Album
2011	"Tag hvad du vil" (Ankerstjerne & Burhan G)	2	Ankerstjerne
2011	"Nattog"	8	Ankerstjerne
2011	"Den første nat" (feat. Xander)	10	Ankerstjerne
2011	"Fotografi af dig" (feat. Rasmus Seebach)	22	Ankerstjerne
2011	"Nu vi to" (feat. Burhan G)	27	Ankerstjerne
2011	"1000 år" (feat. Rasmus Seebach)	7	Ankerstjerne
2013	"Laver penge"	25	
2014	"Lille hjerte" (feat. Shaka Loveless)	3	
2015	"Mit navn i lys" (feat. Lille & Isaac Kasule)	9	For os

=== Other appearances ===
Featured in as Jinks

Year	Single	Peak chart positions	Album
Year	Single	DEN	Album
2010	"Det går ned i nat" (Joey Moe feat. Jinks	28	
2010	"Gi' det til dig" (Aligator feat. Jinks)	33	
2010	"Lighters Up" (ChriZ feat. Joey Moe & Jinks)	16	

Featured as Ankerstjerne

Year	Single	Peak chart positions	Album
Year	Single	DEN	Album
2011	"Millionær" (Rasmus Seebach feat. Ankerstjerne)	2	Rasmus Seebach's album Mer' end kærlighed
2012	"Det blir en go dag" (Hej Matematik feat. Ankerstjerne)	39	
