= ArtPeople =

Danish arts and entertainment company

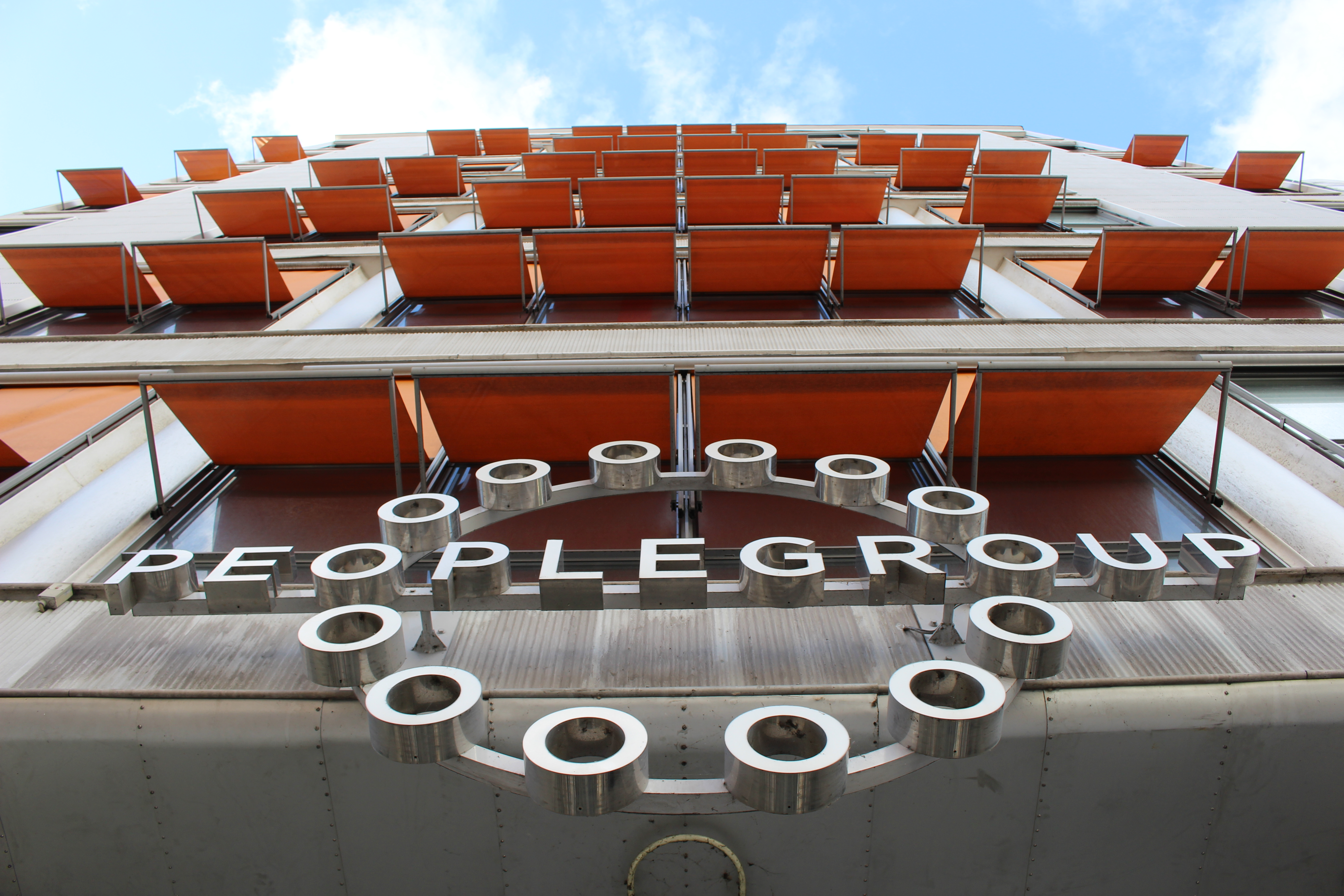
PeopleGroup, 2015-09-20.

ArtPeople is a Danish arts and entertainment company specializing in book and music publishing and also acting as a booking agency. ArtPeople runs a music company that, among other things, includes the distribution of records/CDs as well as films and DVDs and also runs the book publishers People'sPress and People's Press junior. ArtPeople also operates a business with the provision of lectures and lecturers. ArtPeople was formed by Jan Degner and Jakob Kvist in 2002.

== Operations ==
- ArtPeople Musik & DVD department – Publishes and releases recordings through the ArtPeople Record label. It also publishes DVDs etc.
- Publishing and booking department including:
  - People'sPress – for publishing of books
  - People'sPressjR (Junior) – for publishing for younger readers and publishing comic books
  - ArtPeople Booking – booking services for writers, musicians etc.

== Record label ==
The "ArtPeople" record label, a growing part of the group has signed many artists including Rasmus Seebach and his best-selling Rasmus Seebach album that stayed at #1 for a total of 25 weeks on Tracklisten, the official Danish Singles Chart in 2010–2011.

Artists signed (selective)

- Lars Ankerstjerne
- Ataf Khawaja
- Christian Brøns
- Jøden
- Jooks
- Johnson
- Karl William
- Kidd
- Rasmus Seebach
- Xander
