= Tommy Seebach =

Danish singer, composer, and keyboardist (1949–2003)

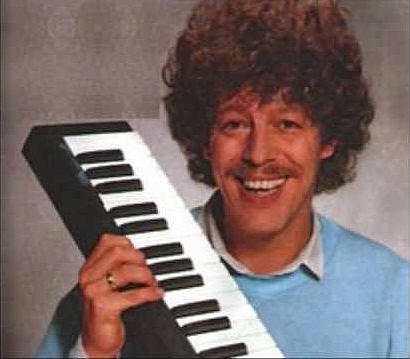

Background information
- Born: Tommy Seebach Mortensen; 14 September 1949; Copenhagen, Denmark
- Died: 31 March 2003 (aged 53)
- Genre: Pop
- Occupation: Musical Artist
- Instruments: Vocals; Piano; Organ; Musical keyboard Guitar
- Years active: 1963–2003

Tommy Seebach (14 September 1949 – 31 March 2003), born Tommy Seebach Mortensen in Copenhagen, Denmark, was a popular Danish singer, composer, organist, pianist and producer. He is best known as front man of Sir Henry and his Butlers and for numerous contributions to the Danish qualifier for the Eurovision Song Contest, the Dansk Melodi Grand Prix, which he won three times. He was the father of songwriter/producer Nicolai Seebach and singer/songwriter/producer Rasmus Seebach.

== Biography ==
=== Musical beginnings ===
Seebach began his musical career as an organist in his own group "The Colours" at age 14. In the following years he played in many pop and beat groups. He played the piano with various orchestras and groups, sometimes going under the name of "Boogie-Woogie-Tommy". He gained mainstream popularity in Denmark in 1965, when he became a member of the band Sir Henry and his Butlers, writing many of their most popular hits. He also worked as a recording engineer at the Rosenberg Studio in Copenhagen and amongst other projects recorded the Icecross album there in 1973.

=== Solo career ===
In 1976 he emerged as a successful solo artist. His hit album "Tommygum" was released in 1977. It was at this time that he recorded and performed "Apache".

=== Eurovision Song Contest ===
Seebach competed seven times in the Dansk Melodi Grand Prix. Only one other act, the Hot Eyes, has ever won the competition three times.

In 1979, his song "Disco Tango", coauthored with Keld Heick, and performed by Seebach, came in as no 1. Finishing 6th at the Eurovision Song Contest 1979, it became a major hit both in Denmark and other European countries. A friendship with fellow contenders Black Lace (UK entry) led to Tommy, producing the single "Hey Hey Jock McCray" for the band, released the following year in Denmark by EMI.

In 1980, his song "Bye-Bye", performed by the duo Lecia & Lucienne, came in 7th.

In 1981, he won the competition once again, in a duet with Debbie Cameron. The song "Krøller eller ej", was also coauthored with Keld Heick. Translated as "Straight or Curly Hair", it finished 11th at Eurovision Song Contest 1981. Cameron has later alleged that Denmark and Israel had been among countries whose sound checks had been sabotaged in order to bring The UK's Bucks Fizz to victory.

In 1982, his song "Hip hurra det’ min fødselsdag" ("Hip hip hurray, this is my birthday"), performed by himself, came in second.

In 1984, "Pyjamas for to" ("Pyjamas for two") came in fourth.

In 1985, "Det’ det jeg altid har sagt" ("I always said this") came in second.

In 1987, "Det’ gratis" ("It is for free") came in fourth.

In 1993, Seebach won the competition again, performing the song "Under stjernerne på himlen" ("Under the stars of the sky"), written together with Keld Heick. He had submitted the song several times before, but had been turned down. At the time, the public interest in the Song Contest, deemed cheesy by the cultural elite, was fading, and as an icon of the contest, Seebach's popularity had been on the wane for some time. It has been alleged that Danmarks Radio had originally turned the song down out of fear that Seebach, who had developed a severe addiction to alcohol, would cause a scandal at the performance. When the song came in as a secure no. 1, his popularity soared for a while, but only to drop dramatically, when the song finished 22nd out of 25 songs at Eurovision Song Contest 1993, receiving only 9 points. The poor result meant that Denmark did not qualify for the ESC 1994, and Seebach was widely criticized, after experiencing a brief rise in popularity, and never competed again.

He had a big hit in 1989 with the duet "Du skælder mig hele tiden ud" ("You're Always Yelling at Me"), sung with Annette Heick, Keld Heick's daughter. They followed up this success with two more singles and a Christmas album.

=== After the Eurovision Song Contest ===
The 1990s were lean years for him as a performer and recording artist. He had a comeback with the release of a disco-version of "Krøller eller ej" released in 1999, as well as the release of a compilation album. He toured the country's discothèques at that time and found cult interest in his old hits among a new, younger audience.

== Personal life ==
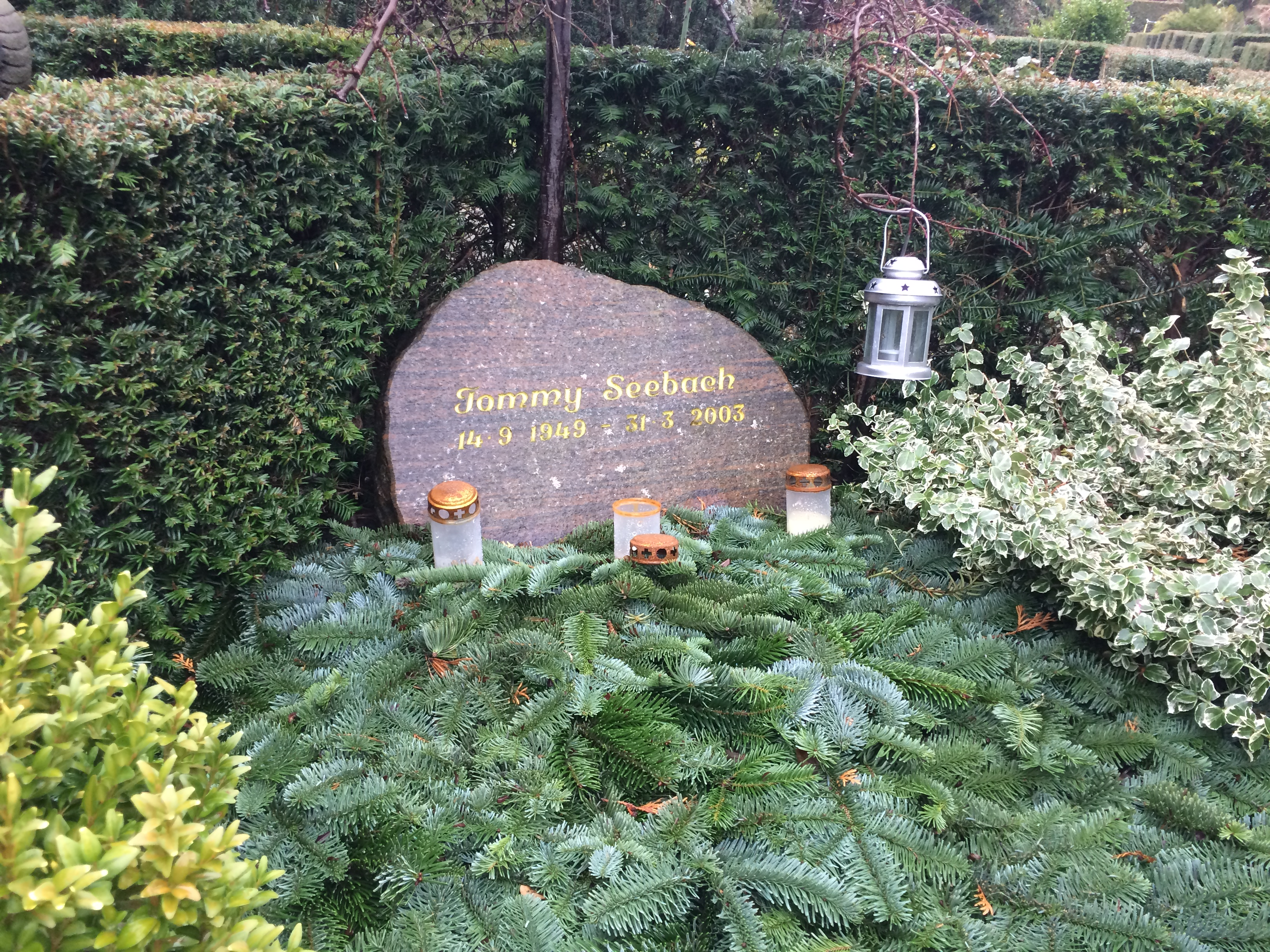
Seebach's grave in Frederiksberg Ældre Kirkegård

Seebach was married for many years to Karen Seebach; they had three children, Nicolai Seebach, Rasmus Seebach and Marie. The marriage broke down when Seebach developed a serious addiction to alcohol. His son wrote a song about him called "Den jeg er" ("Who I am"), stating what a major influence his father had in his life in spite of his addiction.

He died at the age of 53 at the amusement park Bakken, where he had been head of musical entertainment for several years. Although he had managed to overcome his alcoholism at the time, the cause of his death, a heart attack, was ascribed to his previous addiction.

== The documentary Tommy ==
2010 saw the launch of Tommy, director Sami Saif's documentary on Seebach's life. Featuring many of Seebach's private videos, as well as television clips and interviews with his widow, children and colleagues in the industry, it documents his public performances and private life, focusing both on his successes and his personal demise.

Tommy received four stars out of six by Politiken, Berlingske Tidende and Ekstra Bladet; B.T. awarded it six stars out of six. Dagbladet Information described it as "... a story of an artist who became a victim of the musical genre which he himself had helped innovate, and who, instead of gaining the broad recognition he had longed for his entire life, ended up with a status somewhere in between national heritage and kitsch clown..." Politiken called the film "worthy, worth seeing and moving", Ekstra Bladet "a moving portrait of a man caught between the music, his family and the bottle".

== Under stjernerne på himlen (2025) ==
The biopic film "Under stjernerne på himlen" was released on 20 March 2025, featuring Danish actor Anders Matthesen as Seebach. The movie covers the later part of Seebach's life, focusing on the Melodi Grand Prix years, his declining popularity, his relationship with his family, his struggle with alcoholism, his participation in the 1993 Eurovision song contest and his passing at the age of the 53. Film magazine Ekko gave the film three stars out of a possible six and wrote in its review that the story of the rise and fall of the Melodi Grand Prix star was shaky, even though Anders Matthesen delivered a strong performance in the lead role. Danish tabloid B.T. gave the film 4 out of 6 possible stars, writing "Under stjernerne på himlen" which depicts the greatness of the Melodi Grand Prix hero - and not least fall - may not make you wiser, but you are in good company". Berlingske writes that "Anders Matthesen in the role of Tommy Seebach makes a great effort, despite the fact that the film never finds its tune." Danish newspaper Dagbladet Information agrees with Berlingske's assessment that Anders Matthesen makes a good figure in the role of Tommy Seebach and calls the film sympathetic.

== Discography ==
=== Albums (solo) ===
- 1975: Wheels
- 1976: Lucky Guy
- 1977: Tommygum
- 1979: Disco Tango (Album)
- 1981: Love On The Line (as Tommy Seebach feat. Debbie Cameron)
- 1983: Den Med Gyngen
- 1983: Tommy Seebach Instrumental
- 1986: Pop-korn
- 1989: Tommy Seebach (album)
- 1993: Under stjernerne på himlen (Album) (as Tommy Seebach Band)
- 1993: Instrumental Megahits 1
- 1994: Instrumental Megahits 2

==== Compilations ====
- 1989: Glædelig jul
- 1993: Tommy Seebach - Volume 1
- 1993: Tommy Seebach - Volume 2
- 1999: 15 sprøde fra Tvebach
- 2004: 100 Go'e Med Tommy Seebach
- 2007: Hip Hurra
- 2007: Glade jul (album)
- 2009: For Fuld Musik: Det Bedste Med Tommy Seebach
- 2010: Komplet & rariteter: De samlede værker
- 2010: Tommy - En Film Om Tommy Seebach - Soundtrack (released as part of the DVD (Deluxe Edition))

=== With Sir Henry and his Butlers ===
- 1967: Camp

=== With Los Valentinos ===
- 1974: In Action!

=== Singles (solo) ===
- 1973: Promises/By The Way
- 1974: Boom Boom Boom/Don't Blame Me
- 1975: The King Of Rock 'n' Roll/Rock, Rock & Rock
- 1975: Wheels/Lesson One
- 1976: Lucky Guy/Wouldn't It Be So Nice
- 1976: I'm In Love/Play Me A Love Song
- 1977: Tommygum Rock 'n' Roll Show/Yes Or No
- 1977: Apache/Bubble Sex
- 1979: Disco Tango/Disco Tango (English Version)
- 1979: Copenhagen (As Seebach Band feat. Debbie Cameron & Lecia & Lucienne)/Boogie-Woogie Rendez-Vous (as Seebach Band)
- 1980: Smiling Turntable (as Seebach Band feat. Debbie Cameron)/Mirror Mirror (as Seebach Band feat. Debbie Cameron)
- 1980: I See The Moon (Duet with Debbie Cameron)/Stuck On You (Duet with Debbie Cameron) (AUS #72)
- 1981: Hit/Love On The Line
- 1981: Krøller Eller Ej (Duet with Debbie Cameron)/Jeg En Går Mig Bygge Vil (Debbie Cameron)
- 1981: Straight Or Curly Hair (Duet with Debbie Cameron)/Tiger
- 1981: Telebox/Telebox (TV Version)
- 1982: Hip Hurra, Det' Min Fødselsdag (As Tommy Seebach & Seebach Band) (feat. Vivian Johansen)/Ta' Mig Med
- 1982: 100.000.000 Tak (as Mick & Seebach Band)/Kvinde
- 1983: Snorkel Og Gummitæer/Andeby
- 1983: Du' Det Dejligste/Vil Du, Tør Du, Ka' Du Eller Hvad?
- 1984: Pyjamas For To/Morgen
- 1985: Heldig Fyr (Det' Det Jeg Altid Har Sagt)/Humbug
- 1986: Klø Mig Lidt På Ryggen/Tak For I Nat, Skat
- 1986: Der Var En Gang En Julenat/Hvornår Bli'r Det Jul? (Søren Bundgaard)
- 1987: Det' Gratis/Endnu
- 1988: Er Du Kvik? (With Birthe Kjær, Kirsten & Søren (a/k/a Hot Eyes) & Keld & Hilda Heick)/Er Du Kvik?
- 1989: Hvad Venter Du På?/Helt Alene Hver For Sig
- 1989: Du Skælder Mig Hele Tiden Ud (Duet With Anette Heick)/Stop
- 1989: Vi Ønsker Jer Alle En Glædelig Jul (Duet with Anette Heick)/Juleknus Og Juleknas
- 1990: En Lille Stribe Solskin/Du Skal Ikke Tro På Noget
- 1991: Feliz Navidad (as Tommy Snebachs Nisseband)/Vi Ønsker Jer Alle En Glædelig Jul
- 1993: Under Stjernerne På Himlen (promotion)
- 1998: Krøller Eller Ej '98 (Duet With Debbie Cameron) (CD-single)
- 1999: Skru' Volumen Op (as G-Bach (Nikolaj & Rasmus Seebach) & Julie Rugaard og Senior (Tommy Seebach) on piano)

=== DVDs ===
- 2010: Tommy – En Film Om Tommy Seebach
- 2010: Tommy – En Film Om Tommy Seebach (Deluxe Edition incl. CD)

Preceded by Mabel with Boom Boom	Denmark in the Eurovision Song Contest; 1979	Succeeded by Bamses Venner with Tænker altid på dig
Preceded by Bamses Venner with Tænker altid på dig	Denmark in the Eurovision Song Contest; 1981 (with Debbie Cameron)	Succeeded by Brixx with Video, Video
Preceded by Lotte Nilsson & Kenny Lübcke with Alt det som ingen ser	Denmark in the Eurovision Song Contest; 1993	Succeeded by Aud Wilken with Fra Mols til Skagen
