= Romania in the Eurovision Song Contest 2008 =

- Eurovision Song Contest 2008
- Participating broadcaster: Televiziunea Română (TVR)
- Country: Romania
- Selection process: Selecția Națională 2008
- Selection date: 23 February 2008

Competing entry
- Song: "Pe-o margine de lume"
- Artist: Nico and Vlad
- Songwriters: Andreea Andrei; Adina Șuteu; Andrei Tudor

Placement
- Semi-final result: Qualified (7th, 94 points)
- Final result: 20th, 45 points

Participation chronology

Romania was represented at the Eurovision Song Contest 2008 with the song "Pe-o margine de lume", composed by Andrei Tudor, with lyrics by Andreea Andrei and Adina Șuteu, and performed by Nico and Vlad. The Romanian participating broadcaster, Televiziunea Română (TVR), held the national final Selecția Națională 2008 in order to select its entry for the contest. Controversy surrounded the event, as TVR was accused of conspiracy, and the song reviewed for plagiarism.

Prior to Eurovision, "Pe-o margine de lume" was promoted by a music video and live performances in Greece, Moldova, Ukraine, the United Kingdom, Belgium, Spain, and Cyprus. Romania qualified in seventh place from the contest's first semi-final on 20 May and ultimately finished in 20th place in the Grand Final on 24 May, achieving 45 points. This remains one of the country's lowest Eurovision placements. Nico and Vlad were accompanied by three backing vocalists and a piano player during their performance, and sang in front of a dark-coloured LED screen. Among other accolades, "Pe-o margine de lume" won a Marcel Bezençon award in the composers' category.

== Background ==
Prior to the 2008 contest, Televiziunea Română (TVR) had participated in the Eurovision Song Contest representing Romania ten times since its first entry in 1994. Its highest placing in the contest had been third place, achieved in 2005 with "Let Me Try" performed by Luminița Anghel and Sistem. In 2007, "Liubi, Liubi, I Love You" performed by the group Todomondo finished in 13th place.

== Before Eurovision ==
=== Selecția Națională 2008 ===
==== Competing entries and shows ====
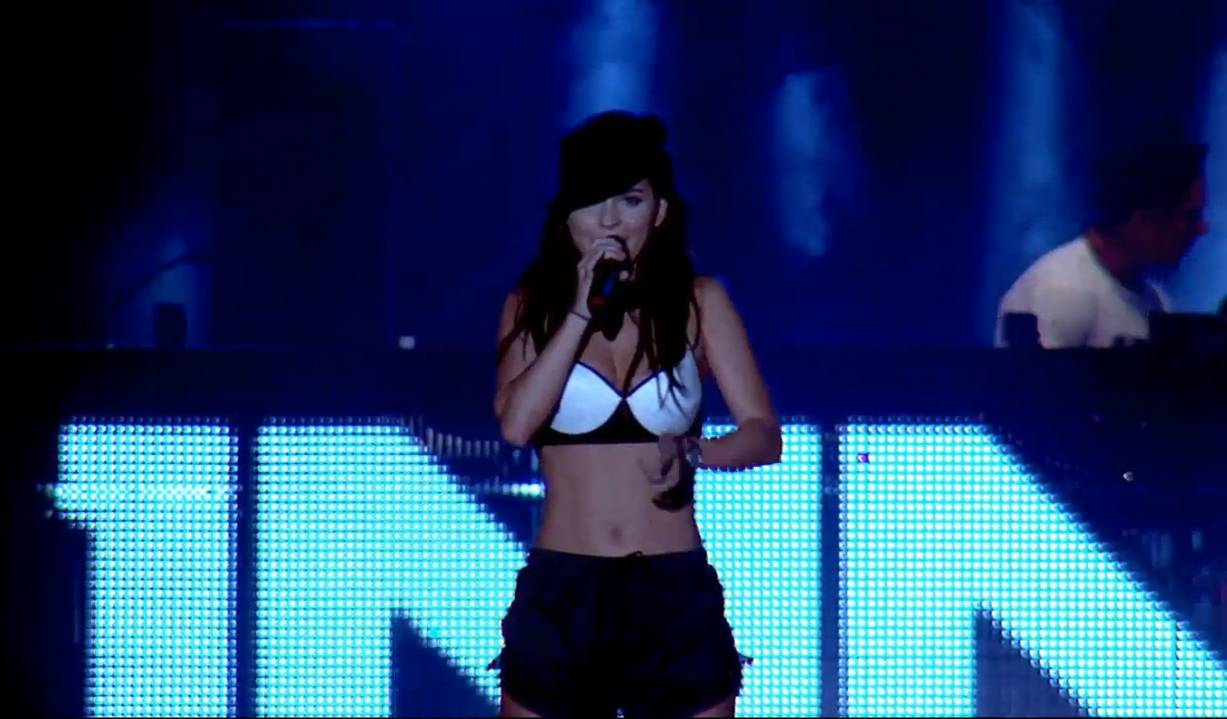
Among the entries submitted to Selecția Națională 2008 were also two unselected ones by now high-profile singer Inna (pictured in 2013) known as Alessandra at the time.

TVR organised Selecția Națională 2008, a competition to select its entry for the Eurovision Song Contest 2008. In early January 2008, the broadcaster published a provisory list of 24 songs shortlisted to compete in the two semi-finals of Selecția Națională, which were held on 9 February and 16 February, followed by the final on 23 February. The list was selected by a jury panel on 16 and 17 January, out of 282 entries submitted to TVR by 15 January. The best-ranked entry was "Dr. Frankenstein" by LaGaylia Frazier. Additionally, four reserve entries—"Brasil" by Tom Boxer featuring Anca Parghel and Fly Project, "La storia della pioggia" by Inesa, "Run Away" by Cătălin Josan, and "Vânt de vară" by Monique—were appointed in case of disqualifications or withdrawals. Among unselected material were also two entries by Inna (known as Alessandra at that time), as well as tracks by Anda Adam, Andra and Connect-R.

Although having been scheduled to progress to the semi-finals, Maya withdrew her song "Time to Rise" in favour of competing in the Irish national selection. While 3rei Sud Est also took back their entry "Vorbe care dor", "Your Love" by Paradise was disqualified from Selecția Națională for having been played on a television show prior to TVR's cutoff date of 1 October 2007; "La storia della pioggia", "Run Away" and "Vânt de vară" replaced the three pull-outs. The results in each show of Selecția Națională were determined by a 50/50 combination of votes from a 12-member jury panel and a public televote. The six best-ranked entries from each semi-final were scheduled to advance to the final. All participants had been promoted by music videos that were broadcast by TVR.

Key
Indicates withdrawn or disqualified song, or unadvanced reserve
Indicates advanced reserve

Artist	Song	Songwriter(s)
3rei Sud Est	"Vorbe care dor"	Laurențiu Duță
Ada (Note: Although "Follow Me" by VH2 had advanced to the semi-final round, Ada's submission with the same title was wrongfully announced as a semi-finalist.)	"Follow Me"	Alexandra Badoi; Mircea Elisei
Biondo (Note: "Shine" was initially credited to Oscar, Lars, Alexander and Fredrik.)	"Shine"	Niklas Edberger; Henrik Wikström; Måns Zelmerlöw
Tom Boxer featuring Anca Parghel and Fly Project	"Brasil"	Cosmin Simionică; Tudor Ionescu; Anca Parghel
Lucia Dumitrescu	"Dragostea mea"	Adrian Romcescu; Cristina Ștefan
Adrian Enache	"Te iubesc"	Cristi Nistor; Ionuţ Turburaş
LaGaylia Frazier (Note: "Dr. Frankenstein" was initially credited to Master Måns. Furthermore, it was planned to be performed with Sahlene before the latter withdrew due to television commitments in Sweden.)	"Dr. Frankenstein"	Niklas Edberger; Kent Olsson; Henrik Wikström
Imba	"Yeke Yeke"	Imba
Inesa and Millenium (Note: Sources credit "La storia della pioggia" differently, including to solely Inesa or Inesa and Millenium.)	"La storia della pioggia"	Adriana Filip; Sandu Gorgoș
Leo Iorga and Pacifica	"Prea mici sunt cuvintele"	Mihai Alexandru; Cezar Cristea
Cătălin Josan	"Run Away"	Radu Bolfea; Sebastian Barac; Marcel Botezan
Cătălin Josan	"When We're Together"	Marius Moga
Ana Mardare and Irvin Doomes	"Heaven"	Irvin Doomes; Tudy Zăhărescu
Maya	"Time to Rise"	Ziga Pirnat; Maya Slatinsek
Monique	"Vânt de vară"	Dincă Zamfira Maria
Simona Nae	"The Key of Life"	Dinu Maxer; Simona Nae
New Effect featuring Genţiana	"Zamira"	Raoul Bogdan; George Lazăr
Nico	"Fight for Life"	Radu Marius Alin
Nico and Vlad (Note: The latter's last name, Miriță, was only included during the Selecția Națională process, and removed afterwards.)	"Pe-o margine de lume"	Andreea Andrei; Adina Șuteu; Andrei Tudor
Daniela Nicol (Note: "Why" was initially wrongfully credited to Violeta Andrei.)	"Why"	Marin Petrache Pechea
Nicola	"Fairytale Story"	Nicoleta Alexandru; Andrei Stanoevici
Paradise	"Your Love"	George Popa; Irina Gligor
Rednex featuring Ro-Mania	"Railroad, Railroad"	Daniel Alexăndrescu; Radu Fornea; Anders Lundstorm; Annika Ljungberg; Mircea Presel; Răzvan Ştefaniu; Jens Sylsjo; Cătălin Voicu
Paula Seling and Provincialii	"Seven Days" (Note: "Seven Days" was initially submitted under a Romanian title, "Șapte zile".)	Cristian Hrişcu Badea; Eduard Cîrcotă
Tabasco	"Love Is All I Need"	Norbert Kovacs; Mircea Adrian Piper
VH2	"Follow Me"	Mihai Pocorschi
Viper	"Mas conmigo"	Mihai Alexandru; Viper
Yanna	"C'est la vie"	Dan Alexăndrescu; Bastian Badiu; Radu Fornea; Sabina Gherescu; Constantin Irenne; Cătălin Zanfir
Zero and Marius Moga (Note: Sources credit "Come This Way" differently, including to solely Zero or Zero featuring Marius Moga.)	"Come This Way"	Marius Moga

==== Semi-final 1 ====
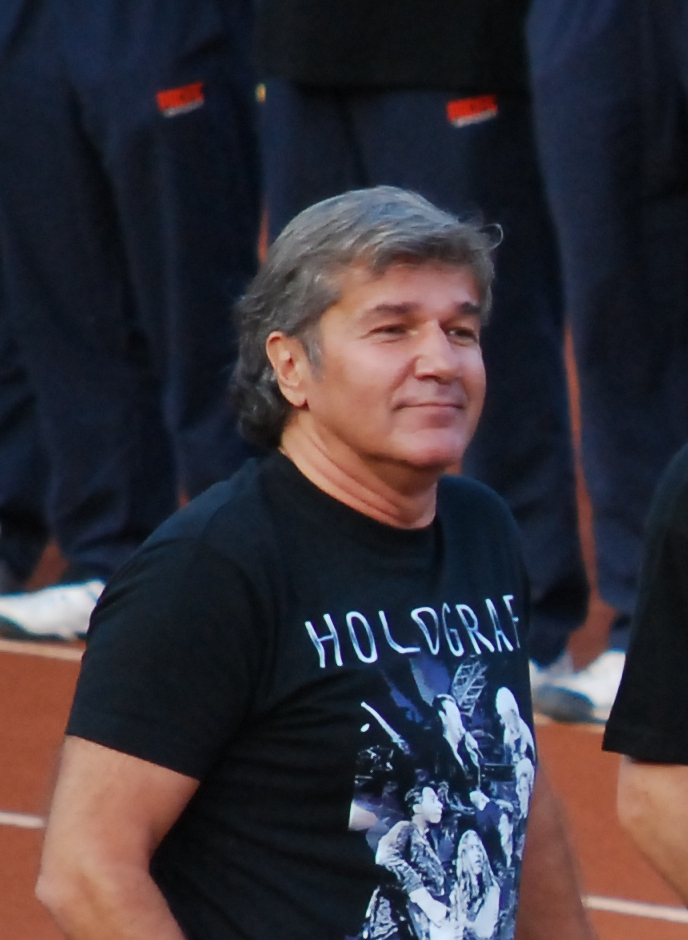
Holograf (lead singer Dan Bittman pictured in 2009) were hired as the interval act for the first semi-final.

The first semi-final on 9 February was held at 19:10 (CET) and hosted by Daniela Nane and Iulian Vrabete. Romanian rock band Holograf served as the interval act. A jury panel was formed to rate the songs, consisting of Romanian music professionals and media personalities: Dani Constantin, Dida Drăgan, Mircea Drăgan, Liviu Elekes, Andrei Kerestely, Liliana Levinta, Bogdan Miu, Adrian Ordean, Victor Socaciu and Madalin Voicu. The combined jury and televote result was as follows:

Semi-final 1 – 9 February 2008
R/O	Artist	Song	Points	Place	Result
1	Nico and Vlad	"Pe-o margine de lume"	272	1	Qualified
2	Inesa and Millenium	"La storia della pioggia"	Unknown		—N/a
3	Adrian Enache	"Te iubesc"	114	8	—N/a
4	LaGaylia Frazier	"Dr. Frankenstein"	Unknown	5	Qualified
5	New Effect featuring Gențiana	"Zamira"	119	7	—N/a
6	Tabasco	"Love Is All I Need"	Unknown	6	Qualified
7	Cătălin Josan	"When We're Together"	217	3	Qualified
8	Daniela Nicol	"Why"	Unknown		—N/a
9	Yanna	"C'est la vie"	Unknown	9	—N/a
10	Leo Iorga and Pacifica	"Prea mici sunt cuvintele"	Unknown	4	Qualified
11	Ana Mardare and Irvin Doomes	"Heaven"	Unknown		—N/a
12	Simona Nae	"The Key of Life"	229	2	Qualified

==== Semi-final 2 ====
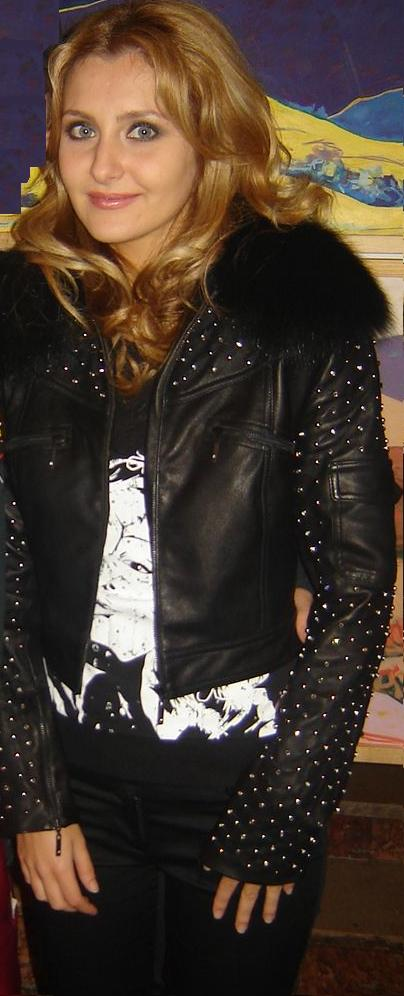
Alina Sorescu (pictured in 2006) co-hosted the second semi-final alongside Iulian Vrabete.

The second semi-final on 16 February was held at 19:10 (CET) and hosted by Vrabete and Alina Sorescu; Nane had been replaced by the latter due to health problems. Laurențiu Cazan, Marcel Pavel and Mihai Trăistariu were hired as interval acts. Biondo won the semi-final, being ranked first by both the jury and the televote (3,089 votes). The jury panel was composed of Romanian music professionals and media personalities: Dana Andronie, Dani Constantin, Dida Drăgan, Mircea Drăgan, Andres Kalimeris, Andrei Kerestely, Bogdan Miu, Adrian Ordean, Pavel, Bogdan Pavlica, Victor Socaciu and Madalin Voicu. The combined jury and televote result was as follows:

Semi-final 2 – 16 February 2008
R/O	Artist	Song	Points	Place	Result
1	Monique	"Vânt de vară"	Unknown		—N/a
2	Lucia Dumitrescu	"Dragostea mea"	Unknown		—N/a
3	Nico	"Fight for Life"	119	8	—N/a
4	Nicola	"Fairytale Story"	206	3	Qualified
5	Zero and Marius Moga	"Come This Way"	189	5	Qualified
6	Rednex featuring Ro-Mania	"Railroad, Railroad"	158	7	—N/a
7	VH2	"Follow Me"	186	6	Qualified
8	Viper	"Mas conmigo"	Unknown		—N/a
9	Cătălin Josan	"Run Away"	206	3	Qualified
10	Imba	"Yeke Yeke"	Unknown		—N/a
11	Biondo	"Shine"	278	1	Qualified
12	Paula Seling and Provincialii	"Seven Days"	228	2	Qualified

==== Final ====
The final on 23 February was held at 19:10 (CET) and hosted by Vrabete and Sorescu, while Iuliana Marciuc interacted with the participants in the green room. Goran Bregović and his Wedding and Funeral Orchestra were hired as interval acts, performing around ten songs. For diversity, the jury rating the entries presented during the event was partly replaced: Titus Andrei, Dani Constantin, Dida Drăgan, Cristian Faur, Florin Ionescu, Mihai Pogășanu, Sebastian Secanu, Victor Socaciu, Tatiana Solomon, Dan Teodorescu, Flavius Teodosiu, and George Zafiu.

The initial draw of the final saw several changes. Upon plagiarism accusations which emerged from an anonymous email sent to TVR, VH2 voluntarily withdrew their entry "Follow Me" to avoid further controversy. Consequently, the originally eliminated "Fight for Life" by Nico was appointed as a replacement, however, the singer turned down the offer since she decided to compete in the contest with only her fellow entry "Pe-o margine de lume". "Zamira" by New Effect and Gențiana were given the wildcard instead. As Cătălin Josan also took back his entry "When We're Together" in order to participate with "Run Away" only, Rednex and Ro-Mania's "Railroad, Railroad" was performed in the final instead. Ultimately, "Zamira" was voluntarily withdrawn due to schedule interferences, resulting in "Te iubesc" by Adrian Enache being planned as a replacement; with him also being unavailable for the final, "C'est la vie" by Yanna was given the last wildcard.

==== Outcome and controversy ====
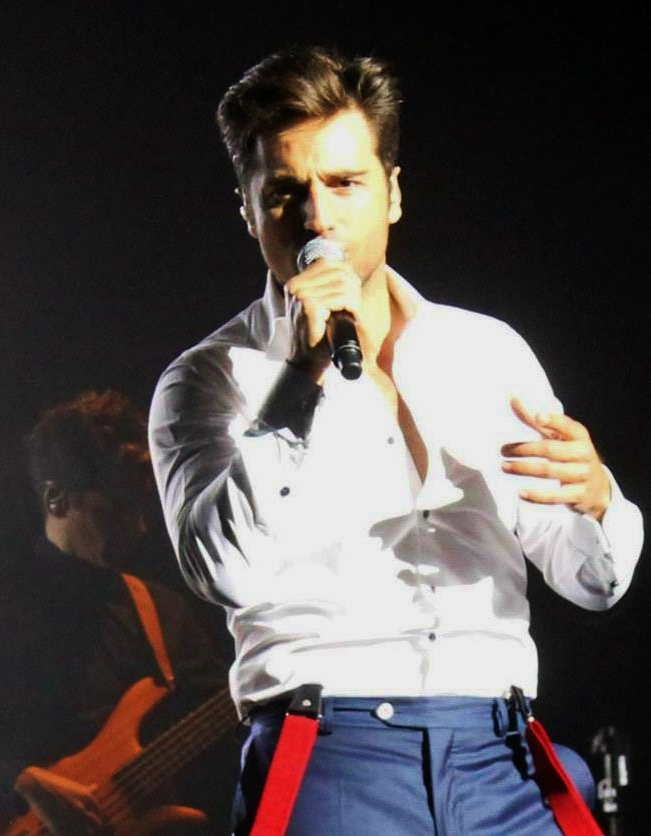
Amidst widespread controversy, "Pe-o margine de lume" was accused of plagiarising "La magia del corazón" by David Bustamante (pictured in 2015).

"Pe-o margine de lume" emerged as the winner of Selecția Națională, scoring a total of 271 points. The song was ranked second by the juries and won the televote, gathering 8,277 votes that were the equivalent of 144 points. Nico and Vlad's victory was heavily contested by fans of second-placed Biondo, who collected 10,000 signatures on an online petition to replace their song. Furthermore, TVR was accused of conspiracy and it was claimed that "Pe-o margine de lume" had been played on Romanian radio prior to the broadcaster's cutoff date for Selecția Națională. Amidst plagiarism allegations in regards to "La magia del corazón" (2002) by David Bustamante, TVR decided to set up a commission for analysis; the claims were ultimately rejected. The results of the national final were:

Final – 23 February 2008
R/O	Artist	Song	Points	Place
1	Leo Iorga and Pacifica	"Prea mici sunt cuvintele"	Unknown	
2	Zero and Marius Moga	"Come This Way"	Unknown	
3	Paula Seling and Provincialii	"Seven Days"	208	3
4	Nicola	"Fairytale Story"	Unknown	
5	Tabasco	"Love Is All I Need"	Unknown	
6	Rednex featuring Ro-Mania	"Railroad, Railroad"	Unknown	
7	LaGaylia Frazier	"Dr. Frankenstein"	Unknown	
8	Biondo	"Shine"	264	2
9	Cătălin Josan	"Run Away"	Unknown	
10	Simona Nae	"The Key of Life"	Unknown	
11	Yanna	"C'est la vie"	Unknown	
12	Nico and Vlad	"Pe-o margine de lume"	271	1

=== Promotion ===
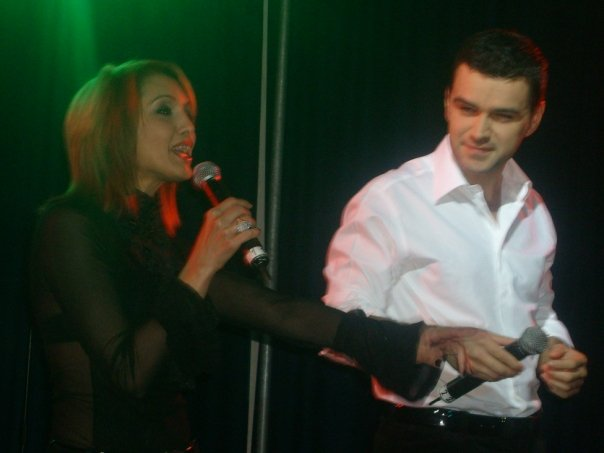
Nico and Vlad performing at the Scala club in London in April 2008.

Cat Music released an enhanced CD of "Pe-o margine de lume" in 2008, which also included the track's music video. Uploaded to the official YouTube account of Cat Music on 18 March, the clip was shot by Petre Năstase at a virgin beach and in an abandoned stone pit. For further promotion, Nico and Vlad visited various countries. On 25 February, they performed "Pe-o margine de lume" at the Greek national final in Athens. In April, the duo was invited to the Chișinău television show Epicentru broadcast on Euro TV Moldova to present their music video and give details concerning ongoing promotional endeavours.

Additionally, Nico and Vlad further travelled to Kyiv to give interviews on several television channels (1+1, MTV Ukraine, M1TV, 24TV and 1TV), radio stations (Nashe Radio and Radio Europa Plus) and magazines and websites (Life as It Is, TV Guide, 24 and e-motion). They were also greeted by the Romanian Embassy in Ukraine. In the United Kingdom, "Pe-o margine de lume" was performed at the UK Eurovision Preview Party held on 25 April in London's Scala club. This was followed by interviews and press conferences with the British press. The following day, the singers participated in several promotional events in Antwerp, Belgium which similarly involved interactions with the press. They were eventually greeted by Antwerp's mayor Patrick Janssens and held a concert in the city before being invited to a TVL Hasselt television show. Further appearances were made in Spain and Cyprus.

== At Eurovision ==
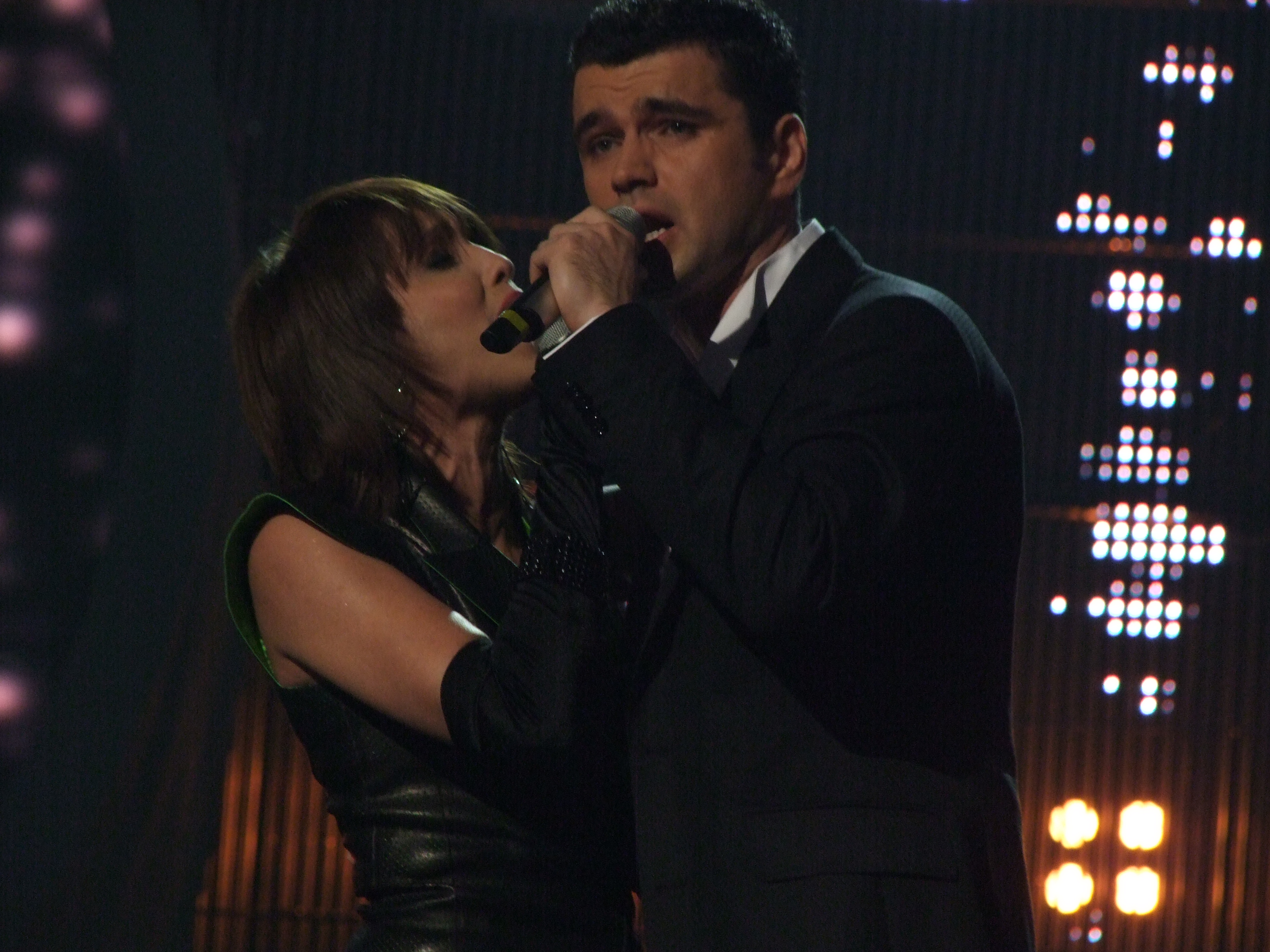
Nico and Vlad performing during the first semi-final of the contest.

The Eurovision Song Contest 2008 took place at the Belgrade Arena in Belgrade, Serbia and consisted of two semi-finals on 20 and 22 May, respectively, and the final on 24 May 2008. According to Eurovision rules, all countries, except the host and the "Big Four" (France, Germany, Spain, and the United Kingdom), were required to qualify from one semi-final to compete in the final; the top ten countries from each semi-final progressed to the final. In Romania, the show was broadcast on TVR with commentary by Leonard Miron. Ioan Duma served as the country's head of delegation.

Nico and Vlad were scheduled for technical rehearsals on 13 and 16 May. Onstage, they performed against a dark LED screen whose colours were predominantly black and blue. Nico wore a silver dress, and three female backing vocalists and a piano player were employed for the performance. Romania performed 17th in the contest's first semi-final, preceded by Finland and followed by Russia, and sang first in the Grand Final, followed by the United Kingdom.

=== Voting ===
Below is a breakdown of points awarded to Romania in the first semi-final and Grand Final, as well as by the country on both occasions. The nation finished seventh in the first semi-final with 94 points, including 12 from Moldova and eight from Israel, Greece, and Spain. In the Grand Final, Romania reached 20th place with 45 points, including 12 from Moldova and Spain, and six from Israel, one of Romania's lowest scores in the contest. The country awarded its 12 points to Greece in both the semi-final and final. TVR appointed Sorescu as its spokesperson to announce the Romanian voting results.

==== Points awarded to Romania ====
Points awarded to Romania (Semi-final 1)
Score	Country
12 points	Moldova
10 points	
8 points	Greece; Israel; Spain
7 points	Ireland
6 points	Andorra; Azerbaijan; Belgium; San Marino; Slovenia
5 points	Armenia; Norway
4 points	
3 points	Germany; Netherlands; Poland
2 points	
1 point	Finland; Russia

Points awarded to Romania (Final)
Score	Country
12 points	Moldova; Spain
10 points	
8 points	
7 points	
6 points	Israel
5 points	
4 points	France; Portugal
3 points	Cyprus; Ireland
2 points	
1 point	San Marino

==== Points awarded by Romania ====
Points awarded by Romania (Semi-final 1)
Score	Country
12 points	Greece
10 points	Moldova
8 points	Russia
7 points	Azerbaijan
6 points	Israel
5 points	Armenia
4 points	Norway
3 points	Netherlands
2 points	Poland
1 point	Slovenia

Points awarded by Romania (Final)
Score	Country
12 points	Greece
10 points	Russia
8 points	Turkey
7 points	Serbia
6 points	Israel
5 points	Norway
4 points	Armenia
3 points	Ukraine
2 points	Azerbaijan
1 point	Croatia
