= Romania in the Eurovision Song Contest =

- Eurovision Song Contest
- Participating broadcaster: Televiziunea Română (TVR)

Participation summary
- Appearances: 24 (20 finals)
- First appearance: 1994
- Highest placement: 3rd: 2005, 2010, 2026
- Participation history: ~~1993~~; 1994; 1995; ~~1996~~; 1997; 1998; 1999; 2000; 2001; 2002; 2003; 2004; 2005; 2006; 2007; 2008; 2009; 2010; 2011; 2012; 2013; 2014; 2015; ~~2016~~; 2017; 2018; 2019; ~~2020~~; 2021; 2022; 2023; 2024; 2025; 2026

External links
- TVR's official website
- Romania's page at Eurovision.com
- For the most recent participation see Romania in the Eurovision Song Contest 2026

Romania has been represented at the Eurovision Song Contest 24 times since its debut in 1994, and has placed in the top ten seven times. Its best result is third place, which the country achieved three times: in 2005, 2010 and 2026. The Romanian participating broadcaster in the contest is Televiziunea Română (TVR), which selects its entrant through Selecția Națională, (Note: Pronounced [seˈlektsi.a natsi.oˈnalə], meaning "The National Selection". The contest is sometimes referred to by local media and TVR as Eurovision România.) a competition organised every year since 1993, (Note: Only the song was chosen through Selecția Națională in 2020, with the artist having been internally selected.) except for 2021.

In 1993, the year before its first appearance, Romania attempted to debut in the contest, but came last in the qualifying round. After joining the following year, poor placements followed until 2002, resulting in several relegations. This changed with the introduction of semi-finals to the contest in 2004, after which Romania reached the final 14 times, failing to qualify from the semi-finals in 2018, 2019, 2021, and 2023, the latter finishing with no points.

== Participation ==
Televiziunea Română (TVR) has been a full member of the European Broadcasting Union (EBU) since 1st January 1993, thus eligible to participate in the Eurovision Song Contest since then. It has participated in the contest representing Romania since the 39th edition in 1994. Before becoming a member of the EBU, TVR had broadcast the contest several times during the 1960s, 1970s, 1980s, and early 1990s.

== History ==
TVR unsuccessfully attempted to debut in the 1993 contest, selecting "Nu pleca" by Dida Drăgan for the qualifying round Kvalifikacija za Millstreet (English: Preselection for Millstreet); Drăgan came in last place. A non-qualification was also achieved in 1996 when there was a qualifying round for all countries excluding hosts Norway. The Eurovision site does not count either year in Romania's list of appearances. The country's first official participation occurred in 1994 with "Dincolo de nori" by Dan Bittman placing 21st in the contest's final. The following years saw similar low placements and non-participations in 1995, 1997, 1999, and 2001.

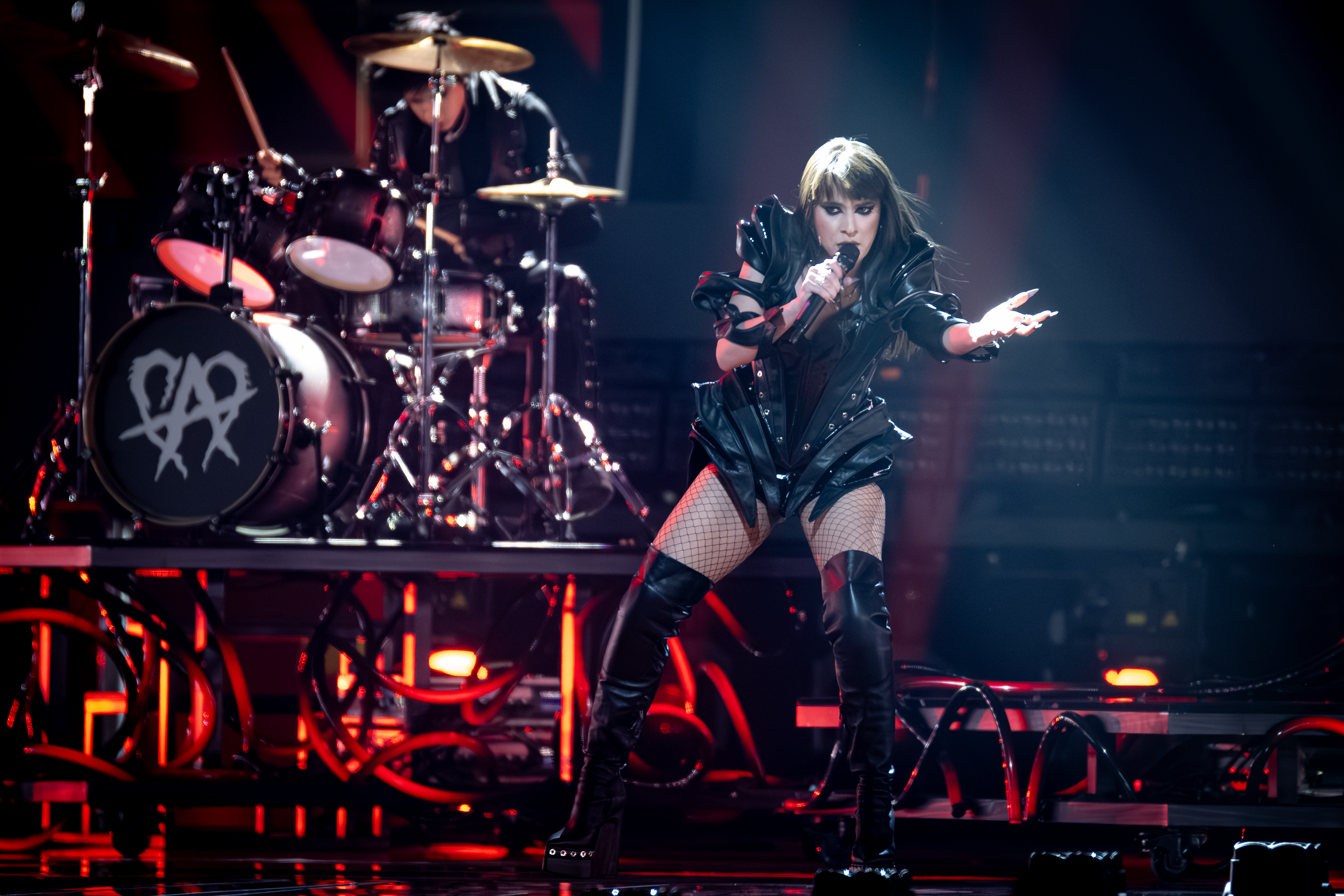
Alexandra Căpitănescu (pictured) placed third with her song "Choke Me" in the 2026 edition of the contest. This is the country's best result alongside their entries in 2005 and 2010.

Romania's first top ten result was achieved in 2002, when "Tell Me Why" by Monica Anghel and Marcel Pavel finished ninth. The country placed within the top 20 every year from 2004 to 2015, claiming its best position to date, third place, in 2005 with "Let Me Try" by Luminița Anghel and Sistem and in 2010 with "Playing with Fire" by Paula Seling and Ovi. In the 2010s, the country's only other top ten placement was in 2017, with "Yodel It!" by Ilinca and Alex Florea, which reached seventh place. 2019 was TVR's first year to significantly invest in a performance; the costs for the use of graphics and special effects during the show for "On a Sunday" by Ester Peony amounted to 100,000 euros. Romania had previously introduced the first-ever use of overlays at Eurovision in 2014.

Romania has participated in the contest 24 times so far, having qualified for the final 15 times since the introduction of the semi-finals in 2004, failing to qualify in 2018, 2019, 2021, and 2023. In 2016, the EBU suspended TVR from all its member services due to the repeated non-payment of debts and the threat of insolvency. This in turn disqualified their 2016 entry, "Moment of Silence" by Ovidiu Anton, from participating in the contest. Although TVR had selected "Alcohol You" by Roxen to be performed in 2020, the contest was cancelled due to the COVID-19 pandemic. Roxen was internally selected for 2021 nonetheless, performing "Amnesia". After failing to qualify for the final in four out of its latest five participations, Romania opted not to take part in 2024 and 2025, and returned to the contest in 2026. Alexandra Căpitănescu represented Romania that year with the song "Choke Me", managing to qualify for the final and place third overall, thus equalling the best-ever results from 2005 and 2010.

== Selection process and accolades ==
Since 1993, TVR organises Selecția Națională, a song contest which has been taking place every year except for 2021, to select its entry for Eurovision. The winner of the first edition was chosen by 1100 households in the country. Since then, several voting procedures have been used, often combining televoting with the votes of a jury panel. The selection of the winner either occurred during one show, or through a varying amount of semi-finals. For the first time, a part of Romania's entry was determined internally in 2020. Roxen was selected by TVR out of exclusive partner Global Records's roster, and was appointed five songs for a jury and the public to choose from. The broadcaster and the label also collaborated the following year for the internal selection of Roxen and her entry.

In 2008, "Pe-o margine de lume" by Nico and Vlad won Romania's first and only Marcel Bezençon Award, in the Composer Award category, and Sanda received the infamous Barbara Dex Award in 2004. A number of Romania's Eurovision entries have experienced commercial success over the years. While "Let Me Try" reached number nine on the Romanian Top 100, 2006's "Tornerò" by Mihai Trăistariu peaked within the top ten in Finland and Greece. "The Balkan Girls" by Elena topped the Romanian chart in 2009, and similar success was attained by "Zaleilah" by Mandinga in 2012, obtaining number two in the country's Airplay 100 ranking and a Gold certification for digital downloads exceeding 10,000 copies in Romania. "Llámame" by Wrs also peaked atop the charts in Romania in 2022.

== Participation overview ==
Table key
1	First place
2	Second place
3	Third place
◁	Last place
◇	Entry selected but did not compete
†	Upcoming event

Participation history
Year	Artist	Song	Language	Final	Points	Semi	Points
1993	Dida Drăgan ◇	"Nu pleca" ◇	Romanian ◇	Failed to qualify (Note: A qualifying round was held for new countries looking to make their debut at the 1993 contest. Romania failed to progress from this round; entries which failed to progress have subsequently been discounted by the EBU and do not feature as part of the countries' list of appearances.)		7 ◁	38
1994	Dan Bittman	"Dincolo de nori"	Romanian	21	14	No semi-finals	
1996	Monica Anghel and Sincron ◇	"Rugă pentru pacea lumii" ◇	Romanian ◇	Failed to qualify (Note: In order to reduce the number of participating countries at the 1996 event a qualifying round was held among all countries except the hosts. Romania failed to progress from this round; entries which failed to progress have subsequently been discounted by the EBU and do not feature as part of the countries' list of appearances.)		29 ◁	11
1998	Mălina Olinescu	"Eu cred"	Romanian	22	6	No semi-finals	
2000	Taxi	"The Moon"	English	17	25	No semi-finals	
2002	Monica Anghel and Marcel Pavel	"Tell Me Why"	English	9	71	No semi-finals	
2003	Nicola	"Don't Break My Heart"	English	10	73	No semi-finals	
2004	Sanda	"I Admit"	English	18	18	Top 11 in 2003 contest (Note: According to the then-Eurovision rules, the top ten non-Big Four countries from the previous year along with the Big Four automatically qualified for the final without having to compete in semi-finals. For example, if two Big Four countries were placed inside the top ten, the 11th and 12th spots would be advanced to next year's final, along with all countries ranked in the top ten.)	
2005	Luminița Anghel and Sistem	"Let Me Try"	English	3	158	1	235
2006	Mihai Trăistariu	"Tornerò"	English, Italian	4	172	Top 11 in 2005 final	
2007	Todomondo	"Liubi, Liubi, I Love You"	English, Italian, Spanish, Russian, French, Romanian	13	84	Top 10 in 2006 final	
2008	Nico and Vlad	"Pe-o margine de lume"	Romanian, Italian	20	45	7	94
2009	Elena	"The Balkan Girls"	English	19	40	9	67
2010	Paula Seling and Ovi	"Playing with Fire"	English	3	162	4	104
2011	Hotel FM	"Change"	English	17	77	4	111
2012	Mandinga	"Zaleilah"	Spanish, English	12	71	3	120
2013	Cezar	"It's My Life"	English	13	65	5	83
2014	Paula Seling and Ovi	"Miracle"	English	12	72	2	125
2015	Voltaj	"De la capăt"	Romanian, English	15	35	5	89
2016	Ovidiu Anton ◇	"Moment of Silence" ◇	English ◇	Disqualified			
2017	Ilinca feat. Alex Florea	"Yodel It!"	English	7	282	6	174
2018	The Humans	"Goodbye"	English	Failed to qualify		11	107
2019	Ester Peony	"On a Sunday"	English	Failed to qualify		13	71
2020	Roxen ◇	"Alcohol You" ◇	English ◇	Contest cancelled (Note: The 2020 contest was cancelled due to the COVID-19 pandemic.)			
2021	Roxen	"Amnesia"	English	Failed to qualify		12	85
2022	Wrs	"Llámame"	English, Spanish	18	65	9	118
2023	Theodor Andrei	"D.G.T. (Off and On)"	Romanian, English	Failed to qualify		15	0
2026	Alexandra Căpitănescu	"Choke Me"	English	3	296	2	234
2027	Confirmed intention to participate †						

== Songs by language ==
1. English (69.9%)
2. Romanian (21.8%)
3. Spanish (3.72%)
4. Italian (3.40%)

Songs	Language	Years
23	English	2000, 2002, 2003, 2004, 2005, 2006, 2007, 2009, 2010, 2011, 2012, 2013, 2014, 2015, ~~2016~~, 2017, 2018, 2019, ~~2020~~, 2021, 2022, 2023, 2026
8	Romanian	~~1993~~, 1994, ~~1996~~, 1998, 2007, 2008, 2015, 2023
3	Italian	2006, 2007, 2008
3	Spanish	2007, 2012, 2022
1	Russian	2007
1	French	2007

== Related involvement ==
=== Heads of delegation ===
Each participating broadcaster in the Eurovision Song Contest assigns a head of delegation as the EBU's contact person and the leader of their delegation at the event. The delegation, whose size can greatly vary, includes a head of press, the performers, songwriters, composers, and backing vocalists, among others.

Year	Head of delegation	Ref.
2000	Dan Manoliu	
2002	Dan Manoliu	
2003	Dan Manoliu	
2004	Dan Manoliu	
2005	Dan Manoliu	
2006	Dan Manoliu	
2007	Dan Manoliu	
2008	Ioan Duma	
2009	Dan Manoliu	
2010	Marina Almăşan	
2011	Marina Almăşan	
2012	Dan Manoliu	
2013	Dan Manoliu	
2014	Liana Stanciu	
2015	Liana Stanciu	
2016	Iuliana Marciuc	
2017	Iuliana Marciuc	
2018	Iuliana Marciuc	
2019	Smaranda Vornicu-Shalit	
2020	Liana Stanciu	
2021	Liana Stanciu	
2022	Iuliana Marciuc	
2023	Mihai Predescu	
2026	Smaranda Vornicu-Shalit	

=== Stage directors ===
The participating broadcaster usually appoints a stage director responsible for directing the live performance of the song at the contest, its camerawork for the television broadcast, and the visuals and props used on stage.

Year	Stage director	Ref.
2009	Bobo Bărbulescu	
2015	Daniel Klinger	
2018	Petre Năstase	
2019	Petre Năstase	
2021	Bogdan Păun and Dan Manoliu	
2022	Aurel Badea	
2026	Jan Bors	

=== Jury members ===
Each participating broadcaster assembles a five-member jury panel consisting of music industry professionals for the semi-finals and final of the Eurovision Song Contest, ranking all entries except their own. The juries' votes constitute 50% of the overall result alongside televoting.

Year	1st member	2nd member	3rd member	4th member	5th member	Ref.
2014	Mădălin Voicu	Mirela Fugaru	Mihai Stoica	Alexandru Călin Geambasu	Nico	
2015	Viorel Gavrilă	Mihai Pocorschi	Ovi	Anca Lupeș	Alexandra Cepraga	
2017	Luminița Anghel	Mihai Trăistariu	Tavi Colen	Paula Seling	Cezar	
2018	Nicu Patoi	Anca Lupeș	Sanda Cepraga	Gabriel Cotabiță	Mihai Alexandru	
2019	Ozana Barabancea	Liana Stanciu	Monica Anghel	Andrei Kerestely	Bogdan Pavlică	
2021	DJ Andy	Ilinca	Liviu Teodorescu	Luminița Anghel	Răzvan Popescu	
2022 (Note: The results of the Romanian jury were not taken into consideration for the contest's second semi-final and final since the EBU detected alleged "irregular voting patterns" in them. As a result, Romania was given a "substitute aggregated result" based on countries with similar voting patterns.)	Sanda Ladoși	Luminiţa Anghel	Ovi	Liviu Elekeş	Mihai Pocorschi	
2023	Bogdan Strătulă	Răzvan Petre	Alexandra Cepraga	Christina Săvulescu	Monica Anghel	

=== Commentators and spokespersons ===
For the show's broadcast on TVR, various commentators and dual commentators have been hired throughout the years, with Leonard Miron notably having done the job on seven occasions. At the contest, after all points are calculated, the presenters of the show call upon each voting broadcaster to invite their respective spokesperson to announce the results of their vote.

Year	Commentator(s)	Spokesperson	Refs.
1991	Unknown	Did not participate	
1992	Unknown	Did not participate	
1994	Gabriela Cristea	Cristina Țopescu	
1995	Unknown	Did not participate	
1996	Doina Caramzulescu and Costin Grigore	Did not participate	
1997	Doina Caramzulescu and Costin Grigore	Did not participate	
1998	Leonard Miron	Anca Țurcașiu	
1999	Doina Caramzulescu and Costin Grigore	Did not participate	
2000	Leonard Miron	Andreea Marin	
2001	Leonard Miron	Did not participate	
2002	Unknown	Leonard Miron	
2003	Unknown	Leonard Miron	
2004	Unknown	Andreea Marin	
2005	Unknown	Berti Barbera	
2006	Unknown	Andreea Marin Bănică	
2007	Unknown	Andreea Marin Bănică	
2008	Leonard Miron	Alina Sorescu	
2009	Unknown	Alina Sorescu	
2010	Leonard Miron and Gianina Corondan	Malvina Cservenschi	
2011	Liana Stanciu and Bogdan Pavlică	Malvina Cservenschi	
2012	Leonard Miron and Gianina Corondan	Paula Seling	
2013	Liana Stanciu	Sonia Argint-Ionescu	
2014	Bogdan Stănescu	Sonia Argint-Ionescu	
2015	Bogdan Stănescu	Sonia Argint-Ionescu	
2017	Liana Stanciu and Radu Andrei Tudor	Sonia Argint-Ionescu	
2018	Liliana Ștefan and Radu Andrei Tudor	Sonia Argint-Ionescu	
2019	Liana Stanciu and Bogdan Stănescu	Ilinca	
2021	Bogdan Stănescu	Cătălina Ponor	
2022	Bogdan Stănescu and Kyrie Mendél	None (Note: Eda Marcus was supposed to announce Romania's results during the final, however she was replaced by the EBU with the contest's executive supervisor Martin Österdahl due to alleged technical difficulties. Contradictory to the EBU, TVR claimed that no technical difficulties had occurred during the jury voting segment of the final.)	
2023	Bogdan Stănescu and Kyrie Mendél	Eda Marcus	
2026	Bogdan Stănescu and Ilinca Băcilă (semi-finals); Bogdan Stănescu and Kyrie Mendél (final)	Eda Marcus	

=== Conductors ===
In contests where an orchestra was provided, a conductor was required to lead the musicians during each country's performance. Broadcasters were able to provide their own conductors, or could call upon the services of the conductor appointed by the host broadcaster. For 1993's Kvalifikacija za Millstreet pre-selection round, George Natsis conducted the Romanian entry. In 1994 and 1998, Irish host conductor Noel Kelehan and Romanian conductor Adrian Romcescu – also the composer of "Eu cred" – were hired, respectively.

== Photo gallery ==
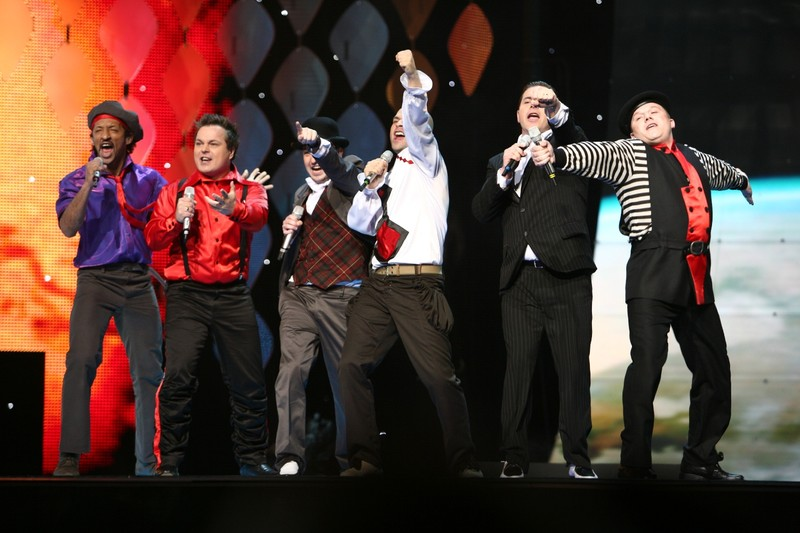
Todomondo in Helsinki (2007)

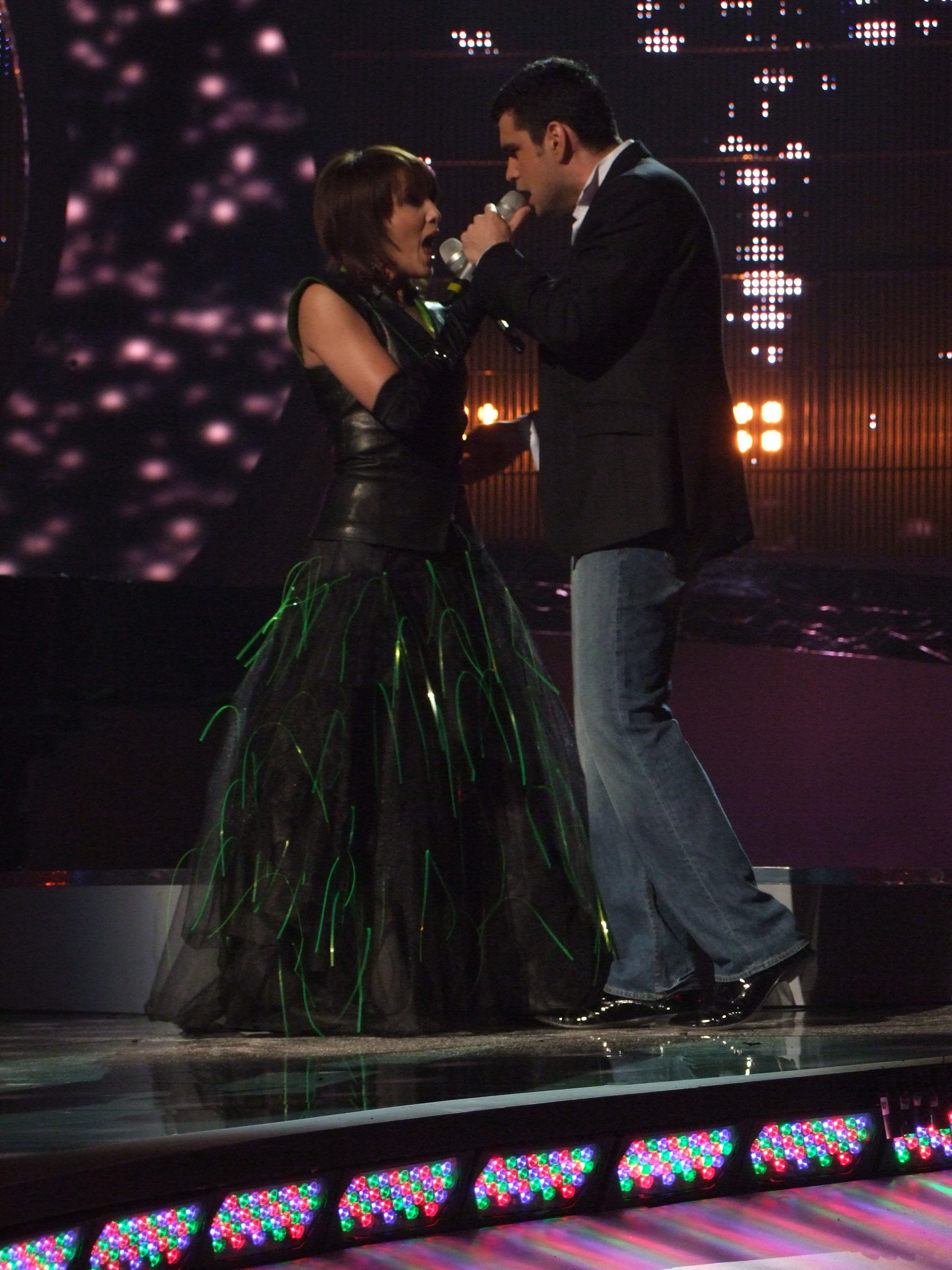
Nico and Vlad in Belgrade (2008)

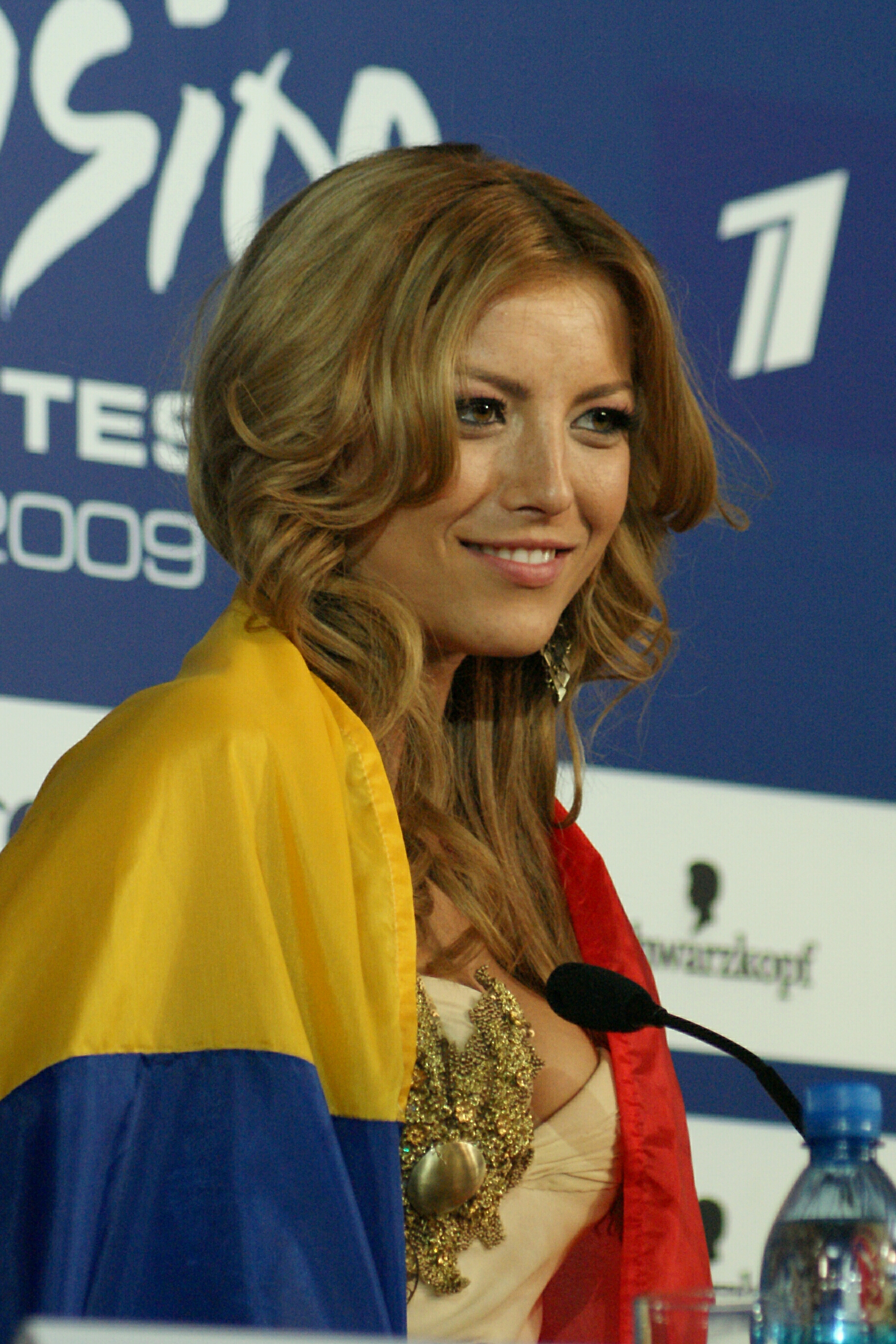
Elena in Moscow (2009)

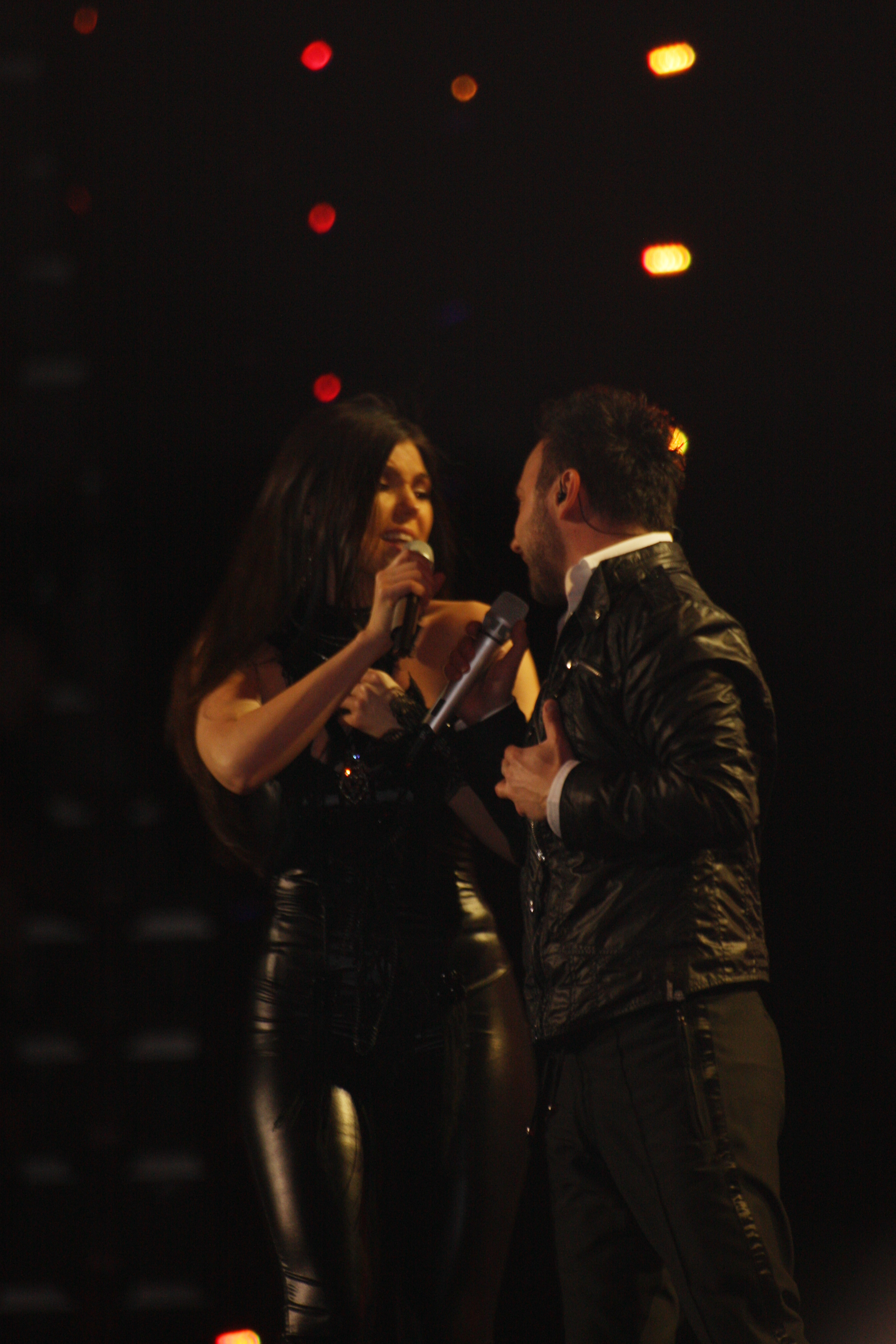
Paula Seling and Ovi in Oslo (2010)

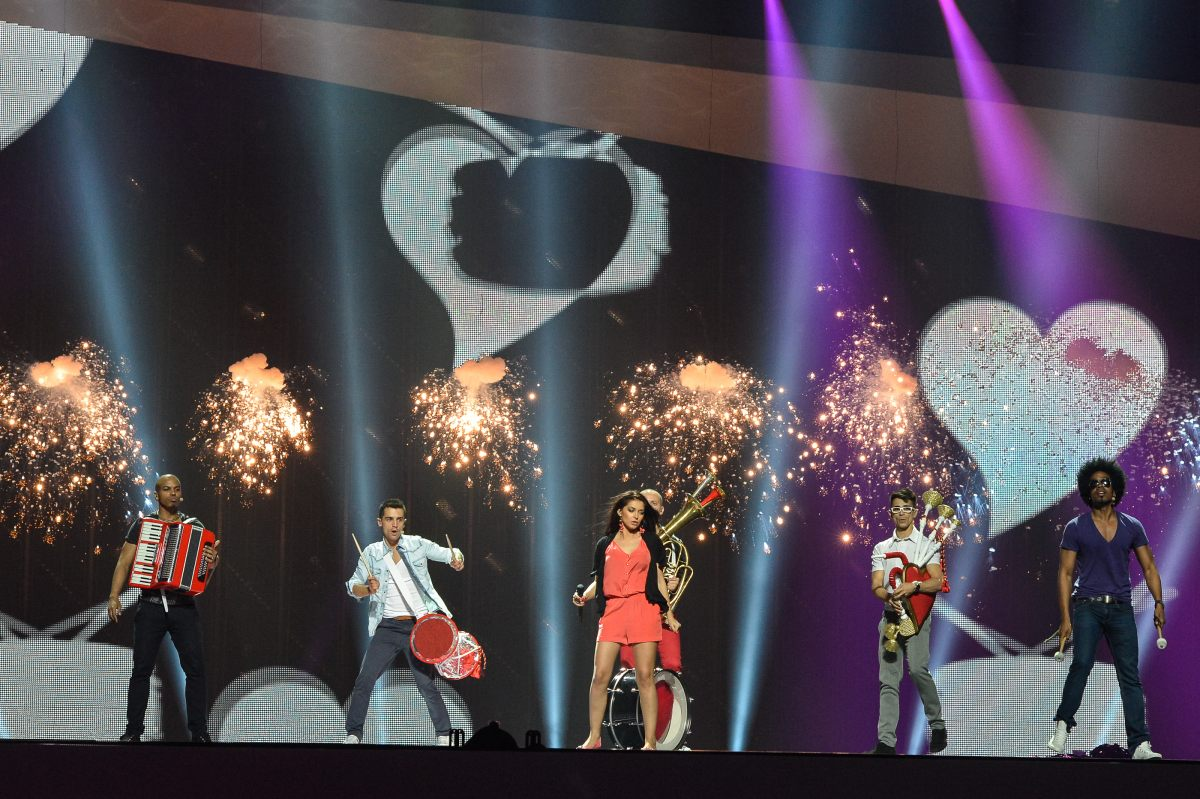
Mandinga in Baku (2012)

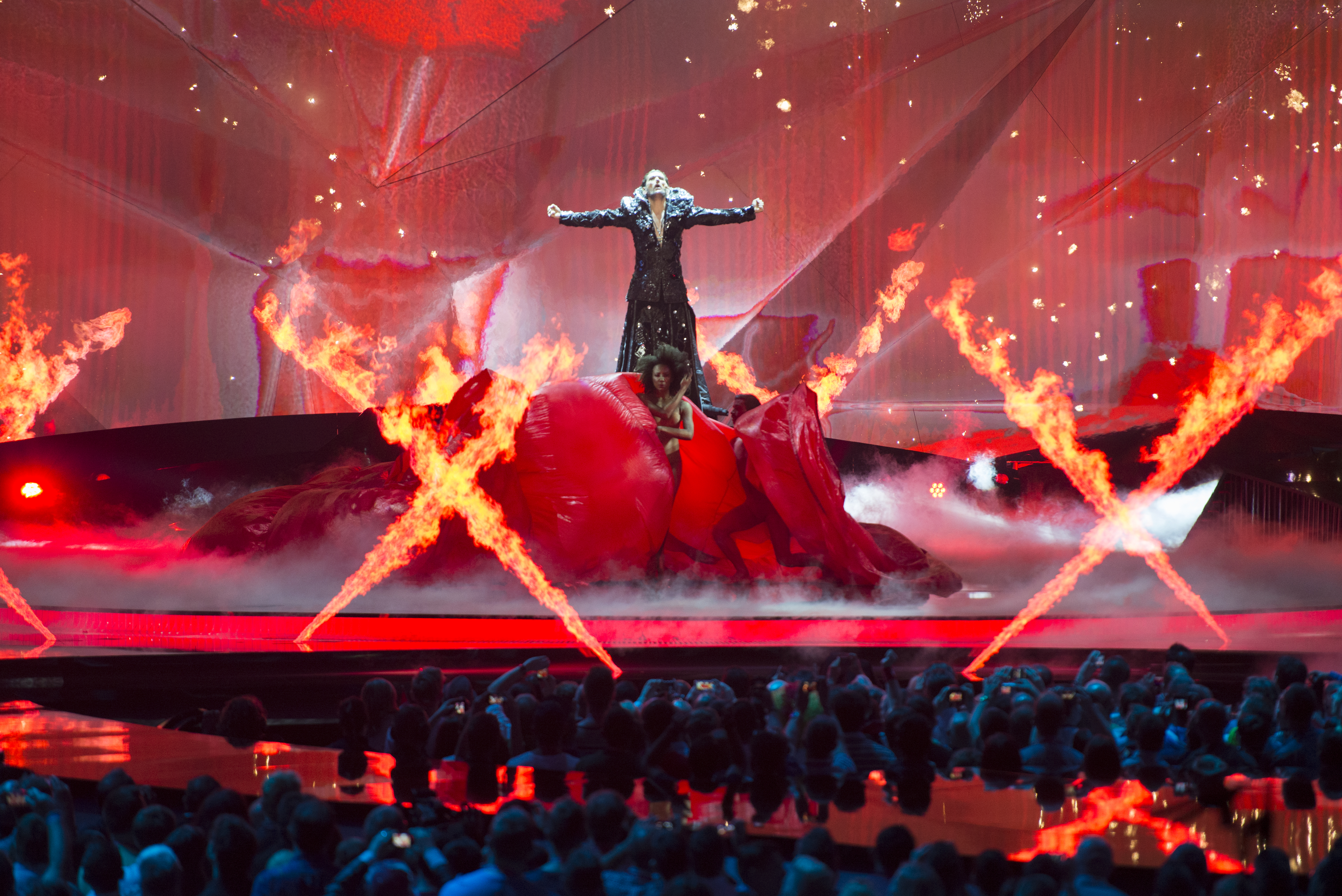
Cezar in Malmö (2013)

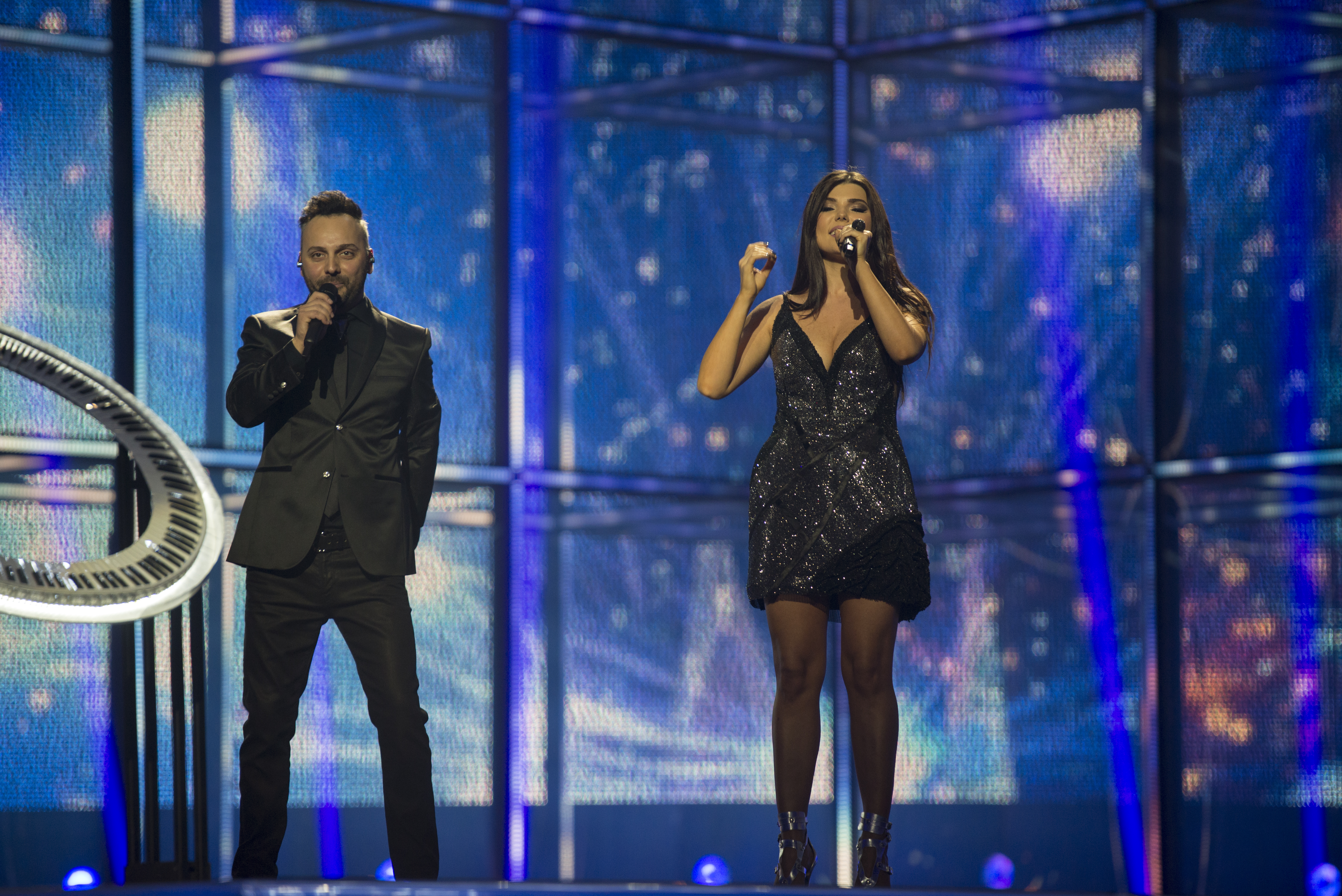
Paula Seling and Ovi in Copenhagen (2014)

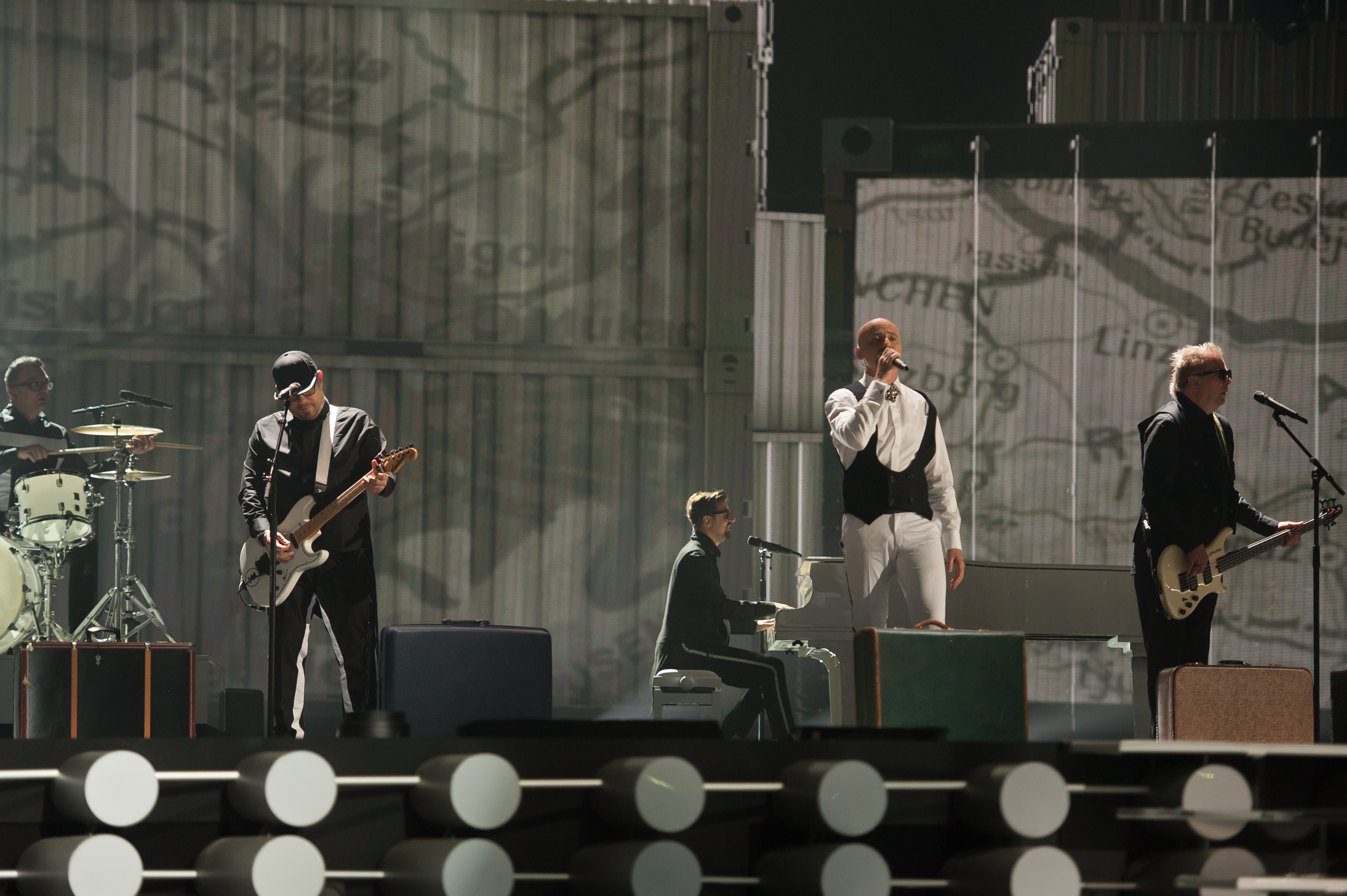
Voltaj in Vienna (2015)

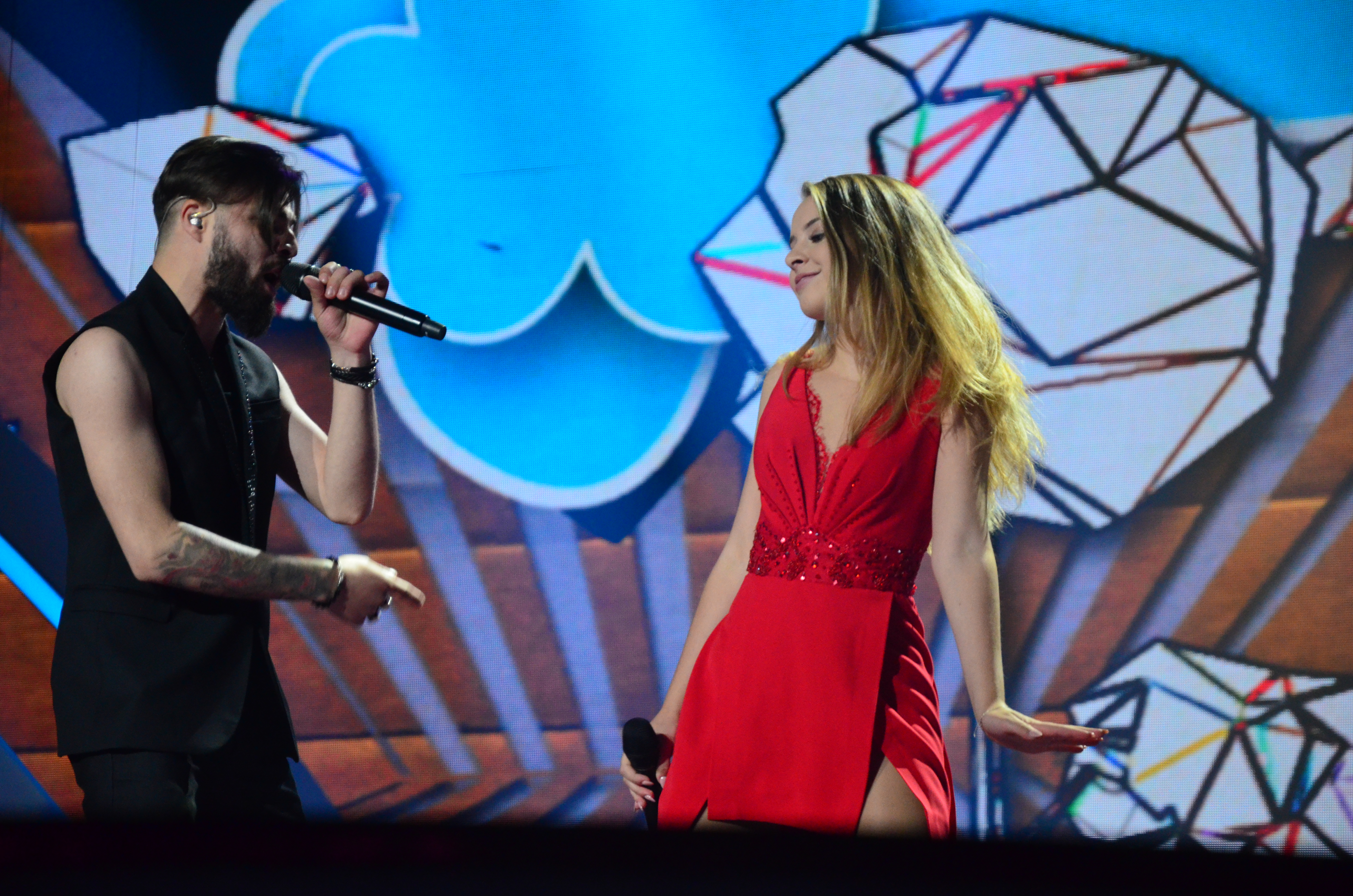
Ilinca and Alex Florea in Kyiv (2017)

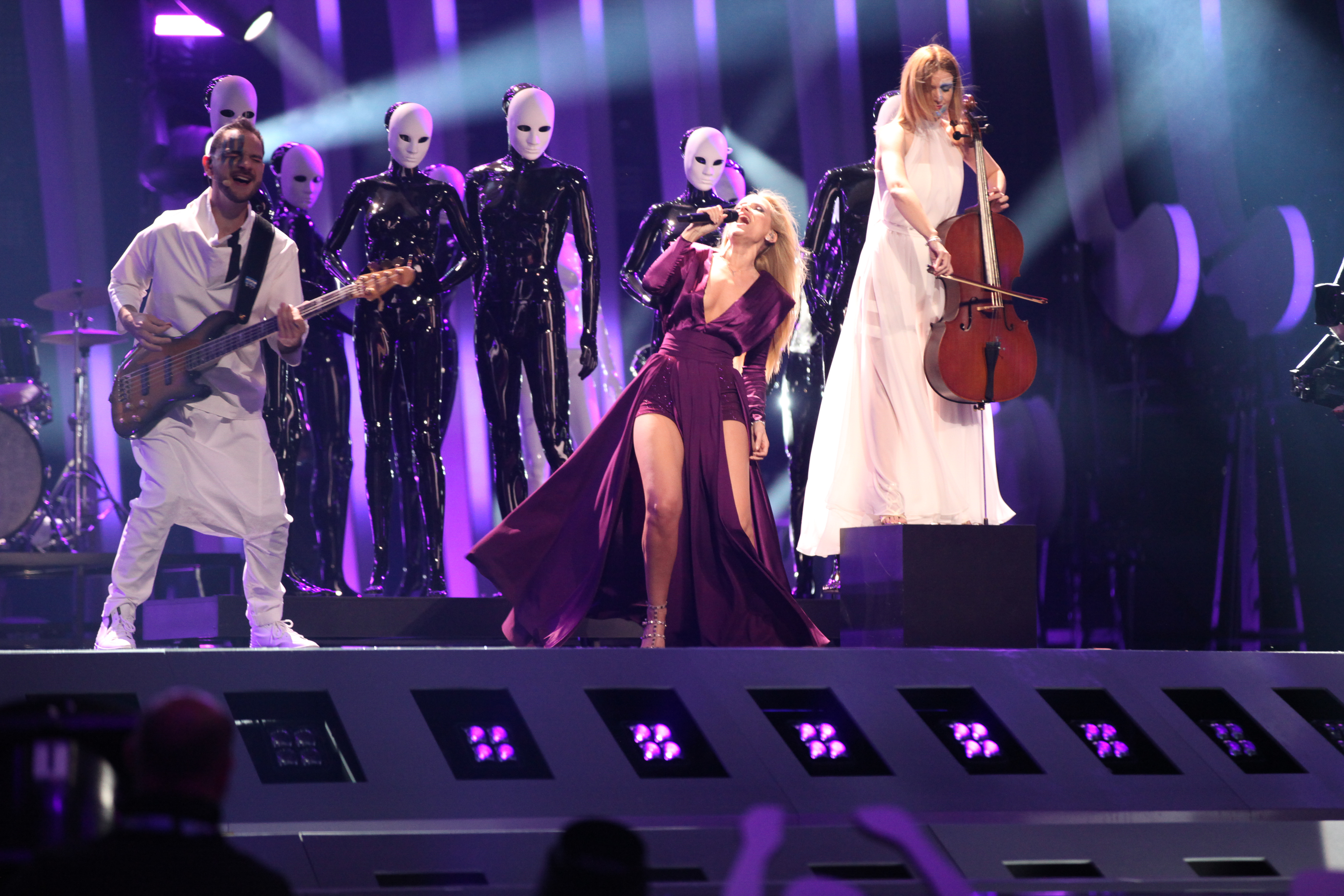
The Humans in Lisbon (2018)

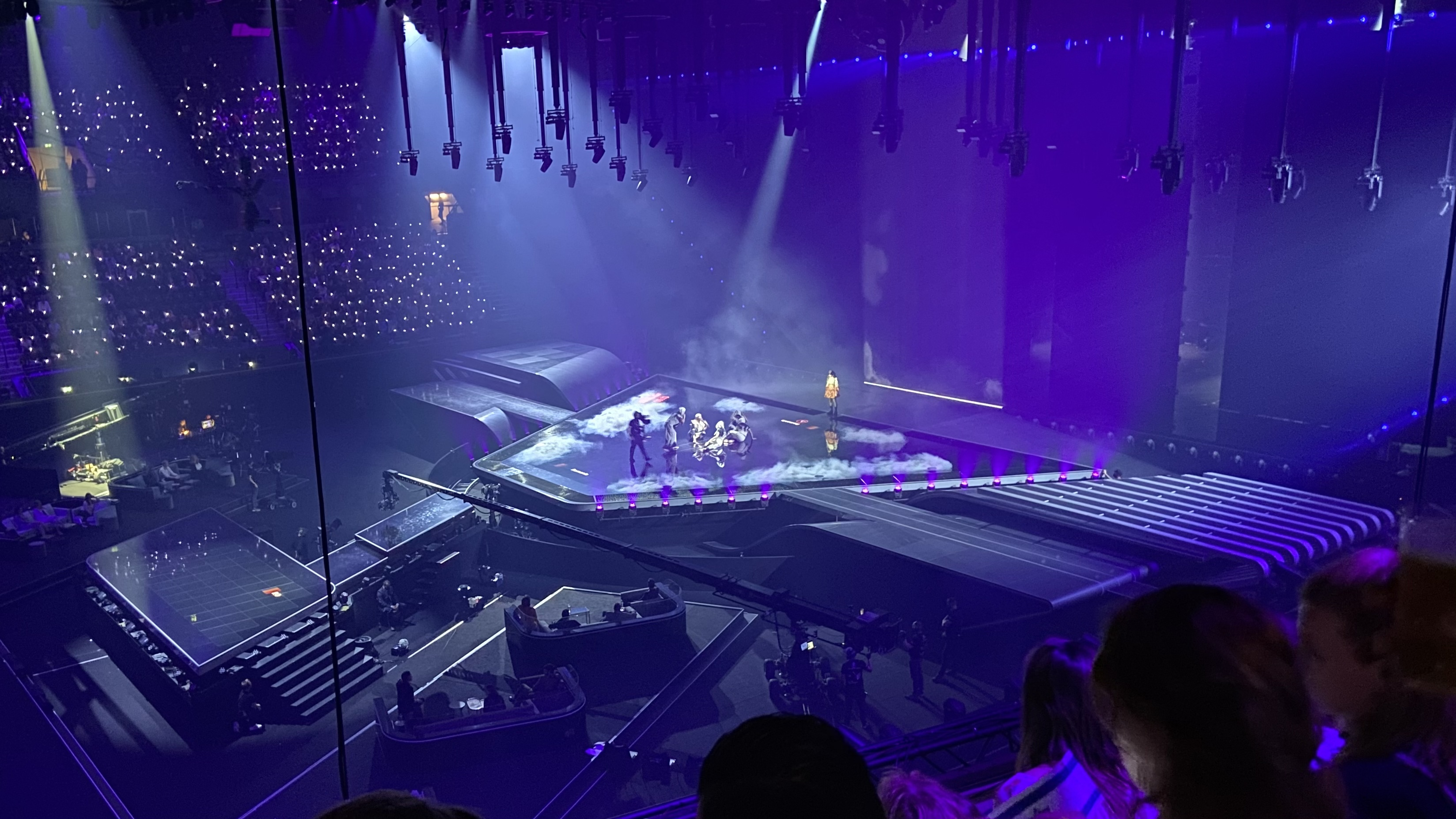
Roxen in Rotterdam (2021)

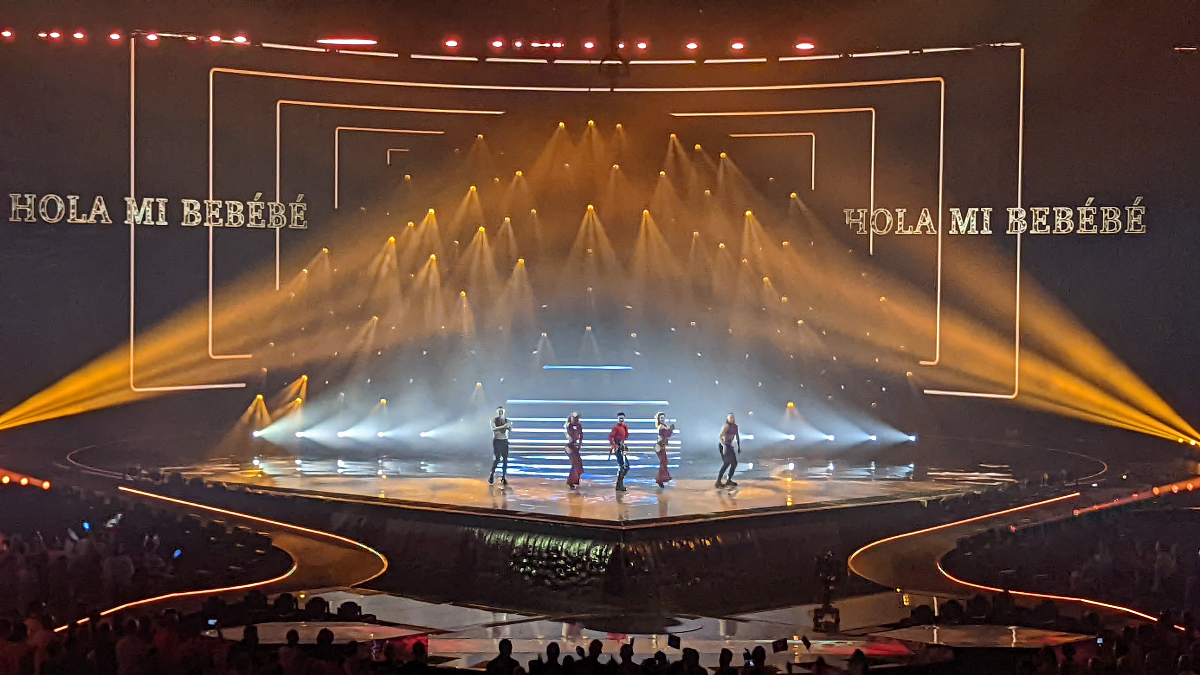
WRS in Turin (2022)

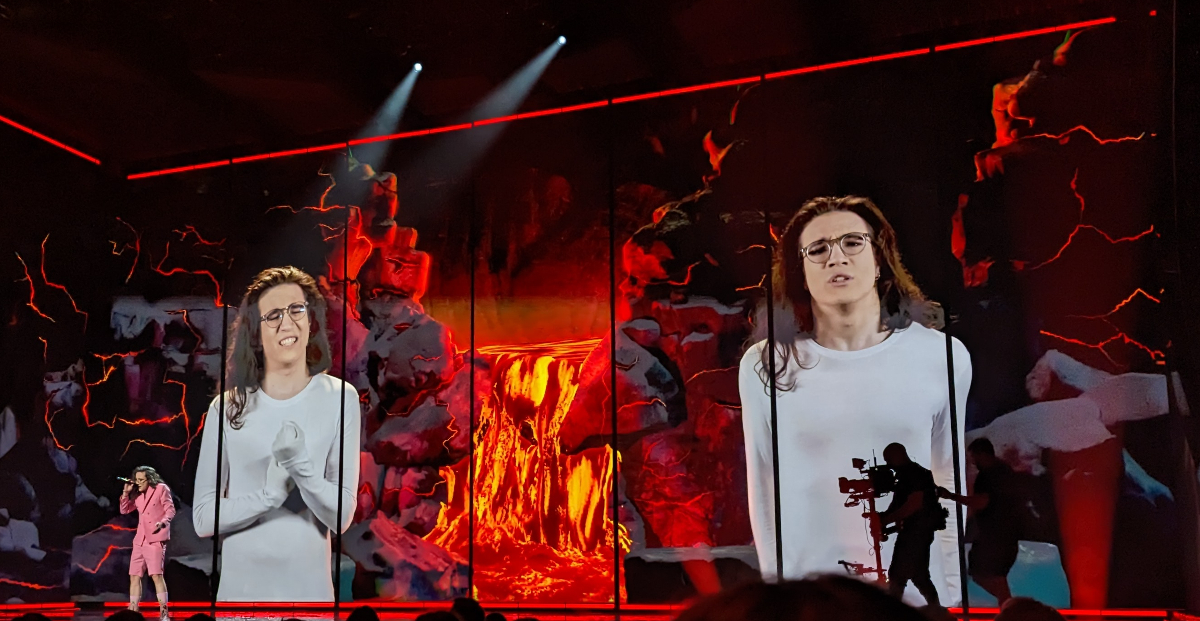
Theodor Andrei in Liverpool (2023)

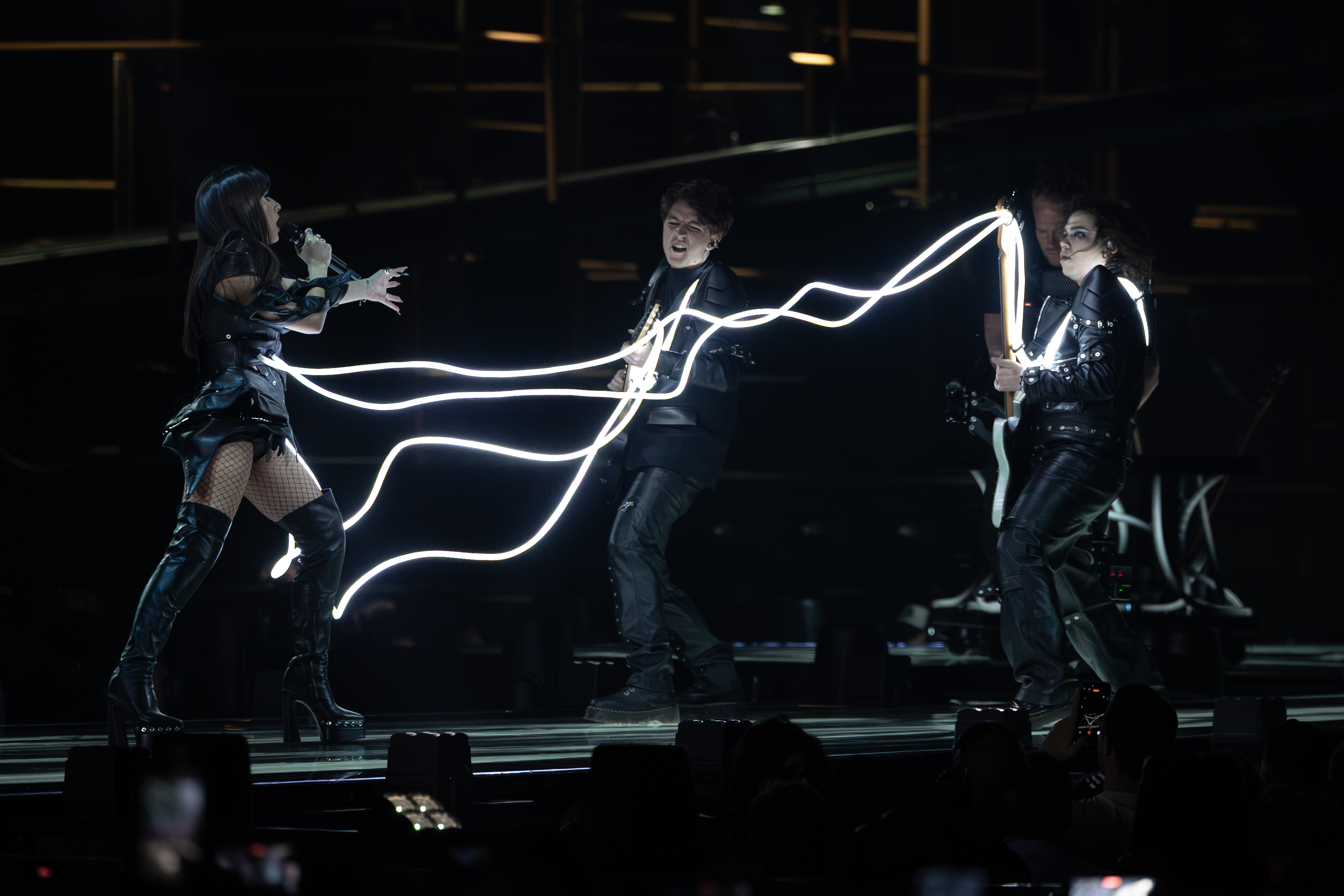
Alexandra Căpitănescu in Vienna (2026)

== See also ==
- Romania in the Eurovision Young Dancers
- Romania in the Eurovision Young Musicians
- Romania in the Junior Eurovision Song Contest
- List of music released by Romanian artists that has charted in major music markets
