= Sorescu =

Sorescu may refer to:

== People with the surname ==
- Deian Sorescu (Romanian pronunciation: [ˈdejan kristiˈan soˈresku]; born 29 August 1997) is a Romanian professional footballer who plays as a winger or a right-back for Ekstraklasa club Raków Częstochowa.
- Marin Sorescu (Romanian pronunciation: [maˈrin soˈresku]; 29 February 1936 – 8 December 1996) was a Romanian poet, playwright, and novelist.
- Alina Sorescu (born 14 July 1986 in Bucharest) is a Romanian singer and TV presenter. She is the host of Tonomatul DP2 on TVR2.
