= Estonia in the Eurovision Song Contest 1993 =

- Eurovision Song Contest 1993
- Participating broadcaster: Eesti Televisioon (ETV)
- Country: Estonia
- Selection process: Artist: Internal selection Song: Eurolaul 1993
- Selection date: 20 February 1993

Competing entry
- Song: "Muretut meelt ja südametuld"
- Artist: Janika Sillamaa
- Songwriters: Leelo Tungal; Andres Valkonen

Placement
- Final result: Failed to qualify from pre-selection (5th, 47 points)

Participation chronology

Estonia was represented at the qualifying round for the Eurovision Song Contest 1993 with the song "Muretut meelt ja südametuld", written by Leelo Tungal and Andres Valkonen, and performed by Janika Sillamaa. The Estonian participating broadcaster, Eesti Televisioon (ETV), selected its entry through a national final, after having previously selected the performer internally. The entry, which would have been the first-ever entry from Estonia in the Eurovision Song Contest, failed to make it through the pre-selection round.

== Background ==
On 15 January 1993, Eesti Televisioon (ETV) confirmed its intentions to debut at the Eurovision Song Contest in its 1993 edition. Along with its participation confirmation, the broadcaster announced the name of its representative at the contest and revealed that the song would be selected through a national final.

ETV was one of the broadcasters from seven new countries who wished to debut in the Eurovision Song Contest in 1993, a pre-selection was held for the first time to reduce this number to three who would advance to the final of the contest.

== Before Eurovision ==
=== Artist selection ===
On 15 January 1993, ETV announced that they had internally selected Janika Sillamaa to represent Estonia at the Eurovision Song Contest 1993. Along with the announcement of the selected artist, ETV announced that a national final would be held to select the song for the contest.

=== Eurolaul 1993 ===
ETV opened a public song submission from 15 January until 5 February 1993. A national final, Eurolaul 1993, was held on 20 February 1993 at the ETV studios in Tallinn, hosted by Mart Sander, to select the song that she would sing at the contest.

The winning song, selected by an expert jury, was "Muretut meelt ja südametuld", which went on to compete for one of the three places in the Eurovision Song Contest 1993.

Final – 20 February 1993
R/O	Song	Songwriter(s)	Points	Place
1	"Lootus"	Ott Arder, Andres Valkonen	135	4
2	"Ma sulle ütlen"	Marika Uus	129	6
3	"Jää hetkeks"	Riho Kerde, Julia Titovskaja	111	7
4	"Unelaul"	Henno Käo, Gunnar Kriik	133	5
5	"Muretut meelt ja südametuld"	Leelo Tungal, Andres Valkonen	193	1
6	"Laulumaa"	Katrin Puur, Priit Pajusaar	100	8
7	"Aeg on laul"	Jüri Leesment, Alo Mattiisen	140	3
8	"Tuhast tõuseb päev"	Kaari Sillamaa, Heini Vaikmaa	180	2

== At Kvalifikacija za Millstreet ==
In the early 1990s, the number of broadcasters eligible to participate in the Eurovision Song Contest increased significantly with the disintegration of Yugoslavia and the subsequent admission into the European Broadcasting Union (EBU) of the broadcasters of the countries that emerged from the breakup. The merger of the EBU with its Eastern European counterpart, the International Radio and Television Organisation (OIRT), further expanded the number of broadcasters by including those from countries of the former Eastern Bloc. The broadcasters from seven of those new countries confirmed their intentions to debut at the 1993 contest. With this large influx of participants, the EBU was forced to create a new measure to counter overcrowding in the contest. The EBU decided to hold a one-off qualification round to select the entries from three of those seven new countries, which would join the entries from the 22 countries already competing in the Eurovision Song Contest.

The Kvalifikacija za Millstreet (Qualification for Millstreet) contest was held in Ljubljana, Slovenia on 3 April at the television studios of Slovene broadcaster Radiotelevizija Slovenija (RTVSLO). Seven countries in total competed, including Estonia, for a place in the final on 15 May 1993. Sillamaa performed third, following Croatia and preceding Hungary. She received 47 points, placing 5th in the line-up, and failing to qualify to the grand final in Ireland.

=== Voting ===
Points awarded to Estonia
Score	Country
12 points	Slovenia
10 points	
8 points	Croatia; Hungary
7 points	Slovakia
6 points	Bosnia and Herzegovina; Romania
5 points	

Points awarded by Estonia
Score	Country
12 points	Hungary
10 points	Slovenia
8 points	Bosnia and Herzegovina
7 points	Slovakia
6 points	Croatia
5 points	Romania
