= Pe-o margine de lume =

Song performed by Nico and Vlad

Single by Nico and Vlad
- Released: 2008
- Length: 3:03
- Label: Cat
- Songwriters: Andreea Andrei; Adina Șuteu
- Producer: Andrei Tudor

Eurovision Song Contest 2008 entry
- Country: Romania
- Artists: Nicoleta Matei; Vlad Miriță
- As: Nico and Vlad
- Languages: Romanian; Italian
- Composer: Andrei Tudor
- Lyricists: Andreea Andrei; Anton Șuteu

Finals performance
- Semi-final result: 7th
- Semi-final points: 94
- Final result: 20th
- Final points: 45

Entry chronology
- ◄ "Liubi, Liubi, I Love You" (2007)
- "The Balkan Girls" (2009) ►

"Pe-o margine de lume" (Romanian pronunciation: [pe̯o ˈmardʒine de ˈlume]; English: "On an edge of the world") is a song by Romanian singers Nico and Vlad Miriță, released on an enhanced CD in 2008 by Cat Music in Romania. It was written by Andreea Andrei and Adina Șuteu, while production was solely handled by Andrei Tudor. An operatic ballad performed in Romanian and Italian, it was likened to the works of Italian singer Andrea Bocelli by music critics. "Pe-o margine de lume" was originally recorded as a solo by Miriță.

The song represented Romania in the Eurovision Song Contest 2008 after winning the pre-selection show Selecția Națională; their win caused several controversies. The song was also suspected of plagiarising "La magia del corazón" (2002) by David Bustamante, prompting the setting up of a commission to analyze both tracks. In Belgrade, Romania qualified to the final and finished in 20th place with 45 points, one of the country's lowest placements in the contest. "Pe-o margine de lume" was promoted by endeavours in Belgium, Spain, Cyprus, Moldova and Ukraine, and by the release of an accompanying music video, shot by Petre Năstase, portraying Nico and Vlad at a beach and in an abandoned stone pit. The track won awards at the 2008 Marcel Bezençon and at the 2009 Radio România Actualități Awards.

== Background and composition ==
"Pe-o margine de lume" was written by Andreea Andrei and Adina Șuteu, while production was solely handled by Andrei Tudor. It was released on an enhanced CD in Romania in 2008 by Cat Music, also featuring the song's music video. "Pe-o margine de lume" is a Romanian- and Italian-language operatic ballad, which an editor of El Mundo likened to the works of Italian singer Andrea Bocelli. In an interview with Eurovision.tv, Miriță denied that "Pe-o margine de lume" was directly inspired by Bocelli's music, although noticing similarities. On the same occasion, Nico revealed that the track originally did not contain lyrics in Italian, but it was the result of her improvising to its melody in the language, matching her feelings. "Pe-o margine de lume" was initially recorded as a solo by Miriță in a longer version, with Nico's vocals being eventually added after the song's bridge was cut out to reduce its length.

== Reception and controversy ==
The song was well-received by the gay community in Spain. It won a Marcel Bezençon award in 2008 in the Composer Award category, as well as in the Best Pop Song section at the 2009 Radio România Actualități Awards. Following accusations of plagiarising "La magia del corazón" (2002) by Spanish singer David Bustamante, the Romanian Television (TVR) decided to set up a commission to analyze "Pe-o margine de lume". After analyzing both tracks, representatives of the Union of Composers and Musicologists of Romania concluded: "In spite of the resemblance of six musical notes from the beginning of the refrain of the two musical works, 'Pe-o margine de lume' can not be considered a plagiarism of 'La magia del corazón', because in their entirety the two musical works are different."

== Music video and promotion ==
An accompanying music video for "Pe-o margine de lume" was uploaded onto the official YouTube account of Cat Music on 18 March 2008. It was filmed by Petre Năstase during 12 hours in two locations – a virgin beach, containing "no people, no hotels [...] like the end of the world, as the song itself describes it", and in an abandoned stone pit which was about ten kilometers away. The music video begins with a shot of musical instruments lying on the beach; Nico walks on the shore in the background, sporting a black dress. Following this, a man is shown playing a piano there, with him later joined by an orchestra, as well as Vlad and Nico, who perform to the song together. Scenes interspersed through the visual's main plot show the artists singing against clocks and a red car. For further promotion, Nico and Vlad embarked on a supporting tour that visited Belgium, Spain, Cyprus, Moldova and Ukraine in March and April 2008, giving interviews and appearing on television shows.

== At Eurovision ==
=== National selection ===
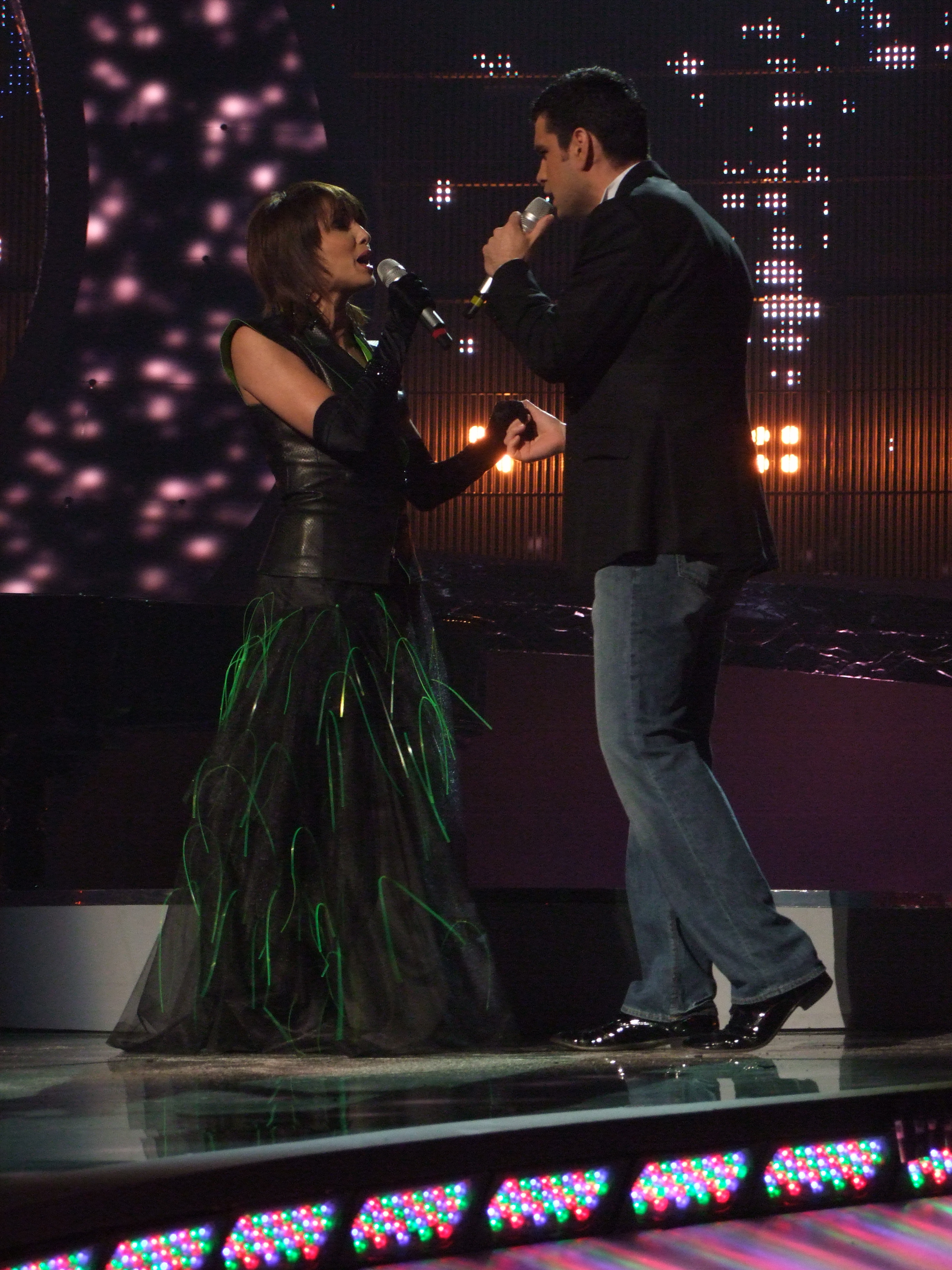
Nico and Vlad performing during the first semi-final of the Eurovision Song Contest 2008.

The Selecția Națională was held in order to select the Romanian entrant for the Eurovision Song Contest 2008, consisting of two semi-finals on 9 and 16 February, respectively, and the final on 23 February 2008. Nico and Vlad qualified in first place from the first semi-final after the votes of an expert jury panel and the televoting were combined. Subsequently, "Pe-o margine de lume" was chosen to represent in Romania in the contest by the same voting system, gathering 271 points in the final. Their win was heavily contested by fans of the second-placed Swedish group Biondo, who collected 10,000 signatures on an online petition to replace the song. Further controversy was sparked when TVR was accused of conspiracy. It was also claimed that "Pe-o margine de lume" was played on Romanian radio prior to 1 October 2008, the submission deadline set by the broadcaster for the Selecția Națională.

=== In Belgrade ===
The Eurovision Song Contest 2008 took place at the Štark Arena in Belgrade, Serbia and consisted of two semi-finals on 20 and 22 May, respectively, and the final on 24 May 2008. According to Eurovision rules, all countries, except the host country and the "Big Four" (France, Germany, Spain and the United Kingdom), were required to qualify from one semi-final to compete for the final; the top ten countries from each semi-final progressed to the final. Nico and Vlad performed 17th in the first semi-final, preceded by Finland and followed by Russia, and sang first in the Grand Final, followed by the United Kingdom. According to Heidi Stephens of The Guardian, Nico wore a "deeply unflattering silver dress that makes her arse look huge". Stephens also compared her appearance to that of Lesley Garrett and Vlad's to that of Michael Ball, while criticizing Nico's vocal delivery.

==== Points awarded to Romania ====
Below is a breakdown of points awarded to Romania in the contest's first semi-final and Grand Final. The country finished seventh in the first semi-final with 94 points, including 12 from Moldova and eight from Israel, Greece and Spain. In the Grand Final, Romania reached 20th place with 45 points, including 12 from Moldova and Spain, and six from Israel, one of Romania's lowest scores in the contest.

== Track listing ==
- Romanian enhanced CD
1. "Pe-o margine de lume" – 3:03
2. "Pe-o margine de lume" (music video) – 3:03

== Charts ==
Chart (2008)	Peak position
Romania (Romanian Top 100)	73

== Release history ==
Country	Date	Format	Label
Romania	N/A 2008	Enhanced CD	Cat
