= Romania in the Eurovision Song Contest 1993 =

- Eurovision Song Contest 1993
- Participating broadcaster: Televiziunea Română (TVR)
- Country: Romania
- Selection process: Selecția Națională 1993
- Selection date: 16 January 1993

Competing entry
- Song: "Nu pleca"
- Artist: Dida Drăgan
- Songwriter: Dida Drăgan

Placement
- Final result: Failed to qualify from pre-selection (7th, 38 points)

Participation chronology

Romania was represented at the qualifying round for the Eurovision Song Contest 1993 with the song "Nu pleca", written and performed by Dida Drăgan. The Romanian participating broadcaster, Televiziunea Română (TVR), selected its entry through the national final Selecția Națională 1993 on 16 January 1993. The entry, which would have been the first-ever entry from Romania in the Eurovision Song Contest, failed to make it through the pre-selection round ranking last. Predominantly negative reactions from Romanian media followed as a result of Drăgan's poor performance.

== Before Eurovision ==
Dida Drăgan (pictured) won TVR's national selection with her entry "Nu pleca". She had been famous in Romania since the late 1980s for her rock music.

Televiziunea Română (TVR) organized the Selecția Națională 1993 on 16 January 1993, a national final to select its entry for the Eurovision Song Contest 1993. A winner out of the 11 competing entries —"Nu pleca" by Dida Drăgan— was announced by Institutul Român de Sondare a Opiniei Publice (IRSOP), who added up the votes of 1100 households in Romania. Although the rest of the result was not publicly revealed, local media speculated that Laurenţiu Cazan and Laura Stoica reached second and third place respectively. The competing entries were:

R/O	Artist	Song	Place
1	Mioara Feraru	"Seară de seară"	—N/a
2	Laurenţiu Cazan	"Hai, spune"	—N/a
3	Nicoleta Alexandru	"Balerina"	—N/a
4	Corina Dogaru	"Plec"	—N/a
5	Mădălina Manole	"Să nu mă minţi"	—N/a
6	Monica Anghel	"Dintr-un vis"	—N/a
7	Laura Stoica	"Dă-mi din nou curajul de-a trăi"	—N/a
8	Dida Drăgan	"Nu pleca" (Note: Written by Dida Drăgan and produced by Adrian Ordean.)	1
9	Carmen Trandafir	"Micul meu univers"	—N/a
10	Elena Cârstea	"Vreau să pierd"	—N/a
11	Elena Cârstea	"Te-aș numi iubire"	—N/a

== At Kvalifikacija za Millstreet ==
In the early 1990s, the number of broadcasters eligible to participate in the Eurovision Song Contest increased significantly with the disintegration of Yugoslavia and the subsequent admission into the European Broadcasting Union (EBU) of the broadcasters of the countries that emerged from the breakup. The merger of the EBU with its Eastern European counterpart, the International Radio and Television Organisation (OIRT), further expanded the number of broadcasters by including those from countries of the former Eastern Bloc. The broadcasters from seven of those new countries confirmed their intentions to debut at the 1993 contest. With this large influx of participants, the EBU was forced to create a new measure to counter overcrowding in the contest. The EBU decided to hold a one-off qualification round to select the entries from three of those seven new countries, which would join the entries from the 22 countries already competing in the Eurovision Song Contest.

The Kvalifikacija za Millstreet (Qualification for Millstreet) contest was held in Ljubljana, Slovenia, on 3 April at the television studios of Slovene broadcaster Radiotelevizija Slovenija (RTVSLO). Romania was the fifth country to perform, following Hungary and preceding Slovenia. The Romanian entry came in last place and failed to qualify, receiving 38 points. 12 points were awarded by Croatia, six by Slovakia and five by Bosnia and Herzegovina, Estonia, Hungary, and Slovenia. The Eurovision site does not count the year in Romania's list of appearances.

=== Voting ===
Points awarded to Romania
Score	Country
12 points	Croatia
10 points	
8 points	
7 points	
6 points	Slovakia
5 points	Bosnia and Herzegovina; Estonia; Hungary; Slovenia

Points awarded by Romania
Score	Country
12 points	Slovenia
10 points	Bosnia and Herzegovina
8 points	Hungary
7 points	Croatia
6 points	Estonia
5 points	Slovakia

=== Reactions and reception ===
Drăgan's poor result attracted overwhelming criticism from the Romanian media. An editor of Evenimentul Zilei accused IRSOP of conspiracy and arranged voting, seeing Laurențiu Cazan as the real winner of Selecția Națională. They also stated that TVR failed to inform the Romanian public about Eurovision, resulting in the rock-inspired "Nu pleca" being sent to the pop-centered Eurovision Song Contest. Adevărul also noted the rock nature of Drăgan's performance, attributing it to her outfit, vocal delivery and movements. Libertatea saw the event as the "artistic suicide of Dida Drăgan", and România Liberă criticized her vocals. Contrary to the negative reviews of 1993, an editor of EuroVisionary, looking retrospectively at Drăgan's performance, stated: "Undoubtedly, the most passionate and dramatic performance of the evening. Dida moved her hands as if life depended on them, and her voice was giving life to the lyrics". However, they slightly criticized her show as being over-the-top.
