= Nico (Romanian singer) =

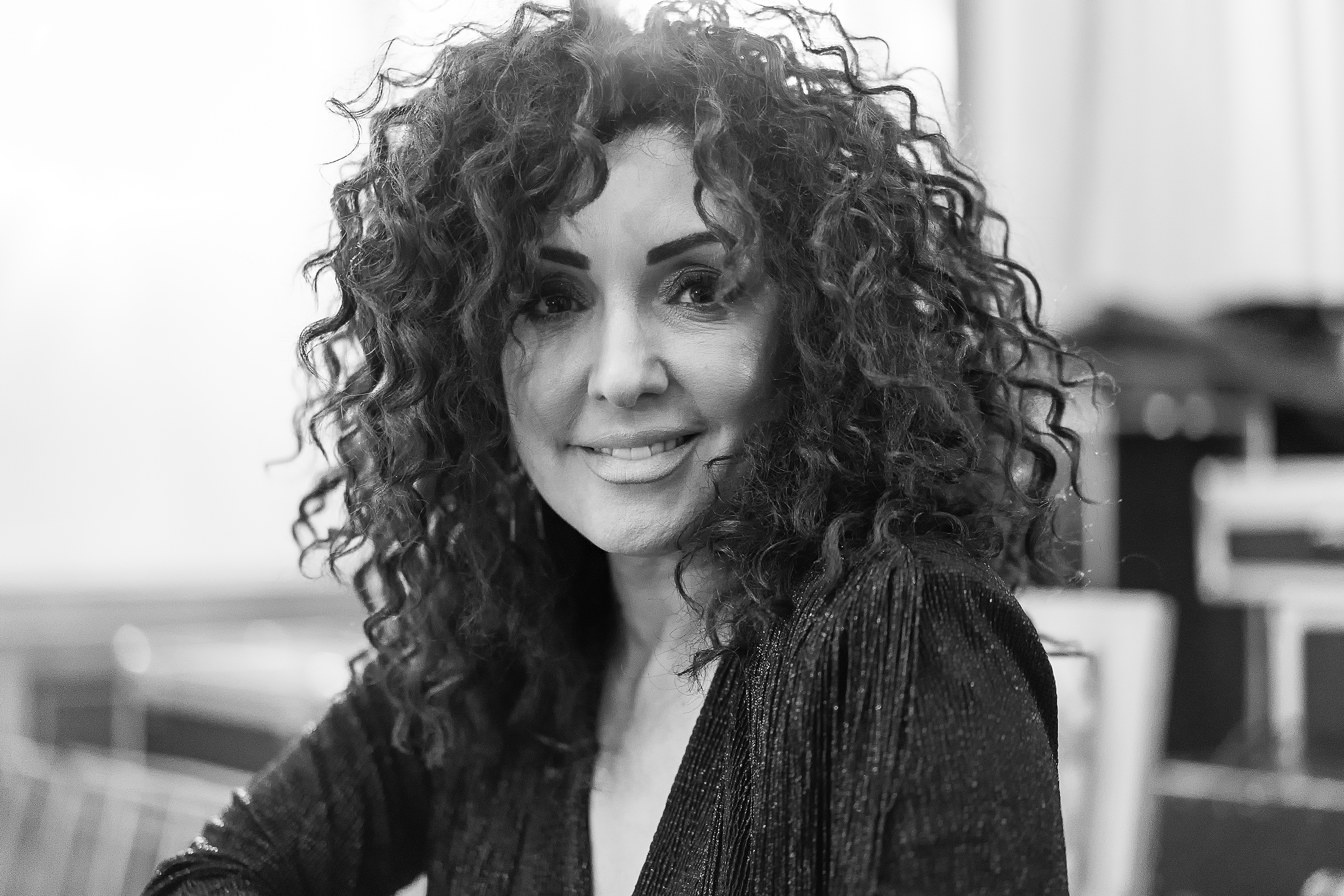

Background information
- Also known as: Nico
- Born: Nicoleta Matei; 1 February 1970 (age 56)
- Origin: Ploiești, Romania
- Genres: Pop, R&B, Rap
- Occupations: singer, tv personality, spokesperson
- Years active: 1999–present
- Website: http://www.nicomusic.ro

Nicoleta Matei (born 1 February 1970), known by her stage name Nico, is a Romanian singer and TV personality. She collaborated with several Romanian hip hop artists, such as Morometzii (in 1999), B.U.G. Mafia (in 2000, 2002), Cabron (in 2003, 2007, 2010), Puya, Blat Jargon, and Codu Penal. She represented Romania along with Vlad in the Eurovision Song Contest 2008 with the song "Pe-o margine de lume".

In 2017 she was chosen by Walt Disney Pictures to provide the Romanian voice of Mrs. Potts in the live-action movie Beauty and The Beast.

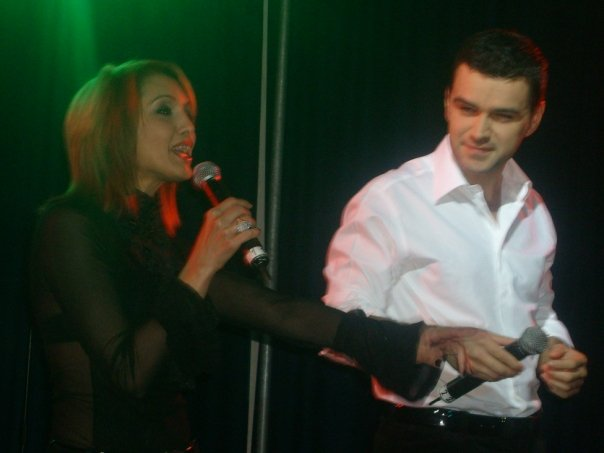
Nico (left) with Vlad Miriţă performing Pe-o margine de lume in the UK, during the Promo Tour

== Discography ==
=== Studio albums ===
- 2003 Gand Pentru Ei
- 2005 Asa Cum Vrei
- 2007 Cast Away
- 2010 Love Mail
- 2016 Motive

=== Singles ===
- "Nu Pot sa Mai Suport", featuring Cabron
- "Asa Cum Vrei" Peak: 98, Romanian Top 100
- "Vocea Inimii"
- "Cast Away"
- "Dulce Amaruie"
- "Pe-o margine de lume" Peak: 24, Romanian Top 100
- "Love Mail" Peak: 3, Romanian Top 100
- "Poate Undeva"
- "Mai Da-Mi O Sansa"
- "100 De Zile"
- "9", featuring F.Charm
- "Clipe" featuring Shobby
- "Alt Inceput" featuring Sonny Flame
- "In Locul Tau"
- "(Sa-mi Dai) Motive"
- "Indestructibili"
- "A Little Late"
- "Suflet Pereche (Stai Langa Mine)"
- "Nebuni Indragostiti"
- "Oare Cine"
- "Vine Craciunul"
- "Amintirile Nu Mor"
- "Vara Pentru Amandoi" / "Corazon Partido"
- "4 Pereti"
- "Scopul si Durata"
- "Esti Liber"
- "Trenul Vietii"
- "Magia De Craciun" featuring Connect-R
- "La Fel Și Eu"
- "Oscar De Dor" featuring Cabron
- "Asculta-ma" featuring Theo Rose
- "O Lume Mai Buna"
- "Zile si Nopti" featuring Pepe
- "Pas cu pas"

== Music competitions, awards and nominations ==
Year	Competition	Category	Song/ Album	Result
1999	Mamaia Music Festival	Creation	Si Daca Viata Mea	2nd place
2003	Golden Stag Festival	Best Interpret	Heaven Knows	2nd place
2004	Mamaia Music Festival	Creation	Spune Da, Spune Nu	2nd place
2004	Voice of Asia	Final	If You Go Away	1st place
2004	Discovery	Final	If You Go Away	1st place
2005	Selecția Națională	Final	All The Time feat. Mihai Trăistariu	3rd Place
2006	Selecția Națională	Final	Jokero feat. Akcent	2nd Place
2006	RRA Awards 2006	Best Pop Song	Asa Cum Vrei	Nominated
2006	RRA Awards 2006	Best Female	-	Nominated
2008	Selecția Națională	Final	Pe-o margine de lume feat. Vlad Miriţă	1st place
2008	Eurovision Song Contest 2008	Semi-final	Pe-o margine de lume feat. Vlad Miriţă	Qualified
2008	Eurovision Song Contest 2008	Final	Pe-o margine de lume feat. Vlad Miriţă	20th place
2008	Eurovision Song Contest 2008	Marcel Bezençon Awards	Pe-o margine de lume feat. Vlad Miriţă	Won
2009	RRA Awards 2009	Best Pop Song	Pe-o margine de lume feat. Vlad Miriţă	Won
2010	International Competition Of Istanbul Songs	Final	Ah Istanbul	1st place
2011	RRA Awards 2011	Best Album	Love Mail	Nominated
2011	RRA Awards 2011	Best Pop Song	Poate Undeva	Nominated
2011	RRA Awards 2011	Best Female	-	Won
2012	RRA Awards 2012	Best Pop Song	Mai Da-Mi O Sansa	Won
2012	RRA Awards 2012	Best Female	-	Won
2015	RRA Awards 2015	Best Female	-	Nominated
2016	Te cunosc de undeva!	Final	Let's Get Loud	4th place

Awards and achievements
Preceded by Todomondo with "Liubi, Liubi, I Love You"	Romania in the Eurovision Song Contest; 2008 (with Vlad)	Succeeded by Elena Gheorghe with "The Balkan Girls"
