= Alina Sorescu =

Romanian singer and TV presenter (born 1986)

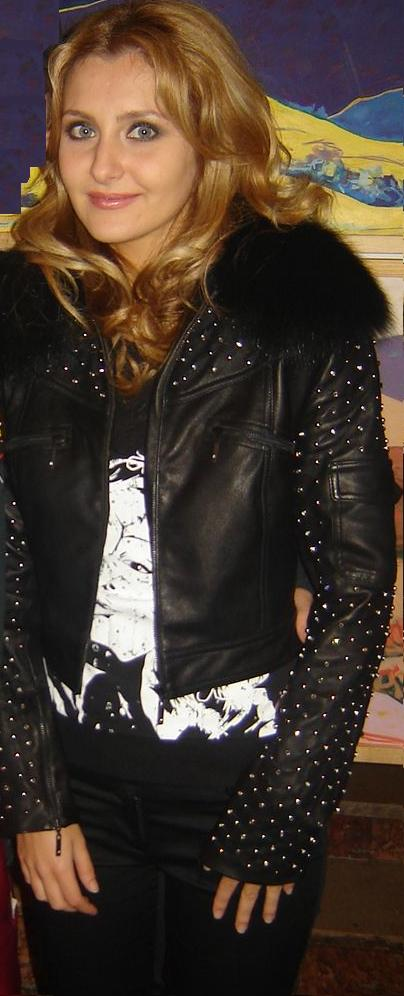
- Sorescu in 2006
- Born: 14 July 1986 (age 40); Bucharest, Romania
- Education: University of Bucharest
- Occupations: Singer; TV presenter
- Years active: 1990s–present
- Spouse: Alexandru Ciuc
- Children: 1

Alina Sorescu (born 14 July 1986 in Bucharest) is a Romanian singer and TV presenter. She is the host of Tonomatul DP2 on TVR 2.

== Career ==
Sorescu won first prize at the Children's Music Festival in Bucharest in 1994. She won it again two years later, defeating nationwide competition. In 1997 at the age of 11, she released her debut album, Voi fi o stea ('I'll be a star'), with tracks composed by Eugen Mihăescu. In 1999, she toured Europe, performing concerts in France, Italy, Belgium and the Netherlands, and studied singing with Professor Viorela Filip. She later studied sociology at the University of Bucharest.

Sorescu ventured into a career as a television presenter. She began presenting Ploaia de stele, a music competitive show on TVR 1, which she appeared in along with Cosmin Cernat. She has since presented Vacanță în stil mare, Ora fără catalog, Portativul piticilor, Miss Plaja and Matinal de vacanță, the latter with co-presenter Leonard Miron. In 2013, she released the single "Numai tu". She now hosts Tonomatul DP2 on TVR 2.

== Personal life ==
Sorescu is married to Alexandru Ciuc. The couple have a daughter named Elena.

In 2016, Disney Channel Romania chose her to sing the main theme from the series The Lion Guard, a series based on the 1994 film The Lion King.
