= Eugen Mihăescu =

Romanian painter and politician

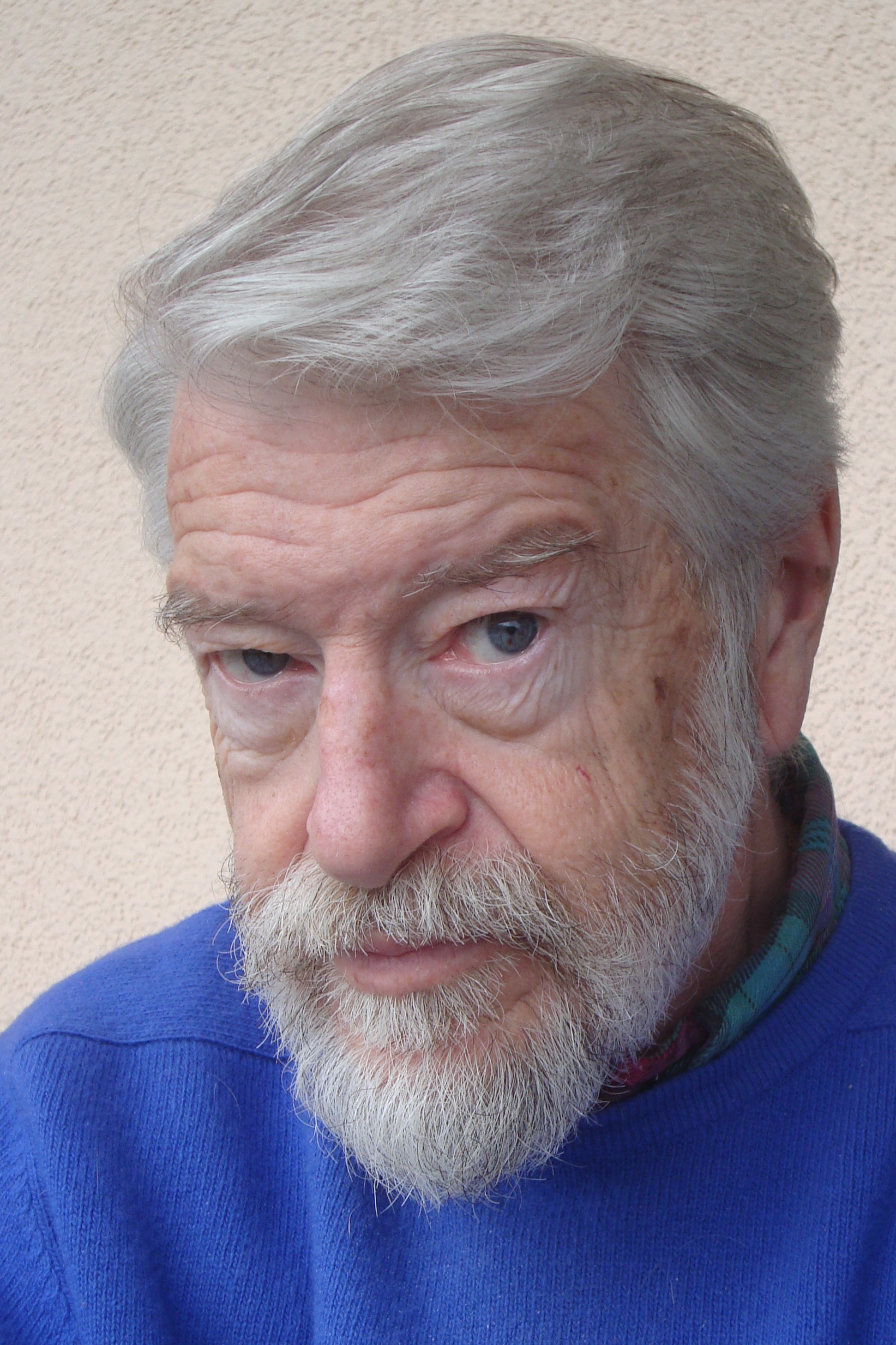

Eugen Mihăescu (born August 24, 1937 in Bucharest) is a Romanian painter, graphic designer and politician. He has been an honorary member of the Romanian Academy since September 8, 1993.

== Bibliography ==
- Steven Heller,, New York, 1981;
- , New York, 1986; 1999–2000;
- Ionel Jianu,, Paris, 1986;
- (coord. Ioan Ivanici, Paraschiv Marcu), Bucuresti, 1995;
- Dan Fornade,, Montreal, 2000;
- Dan Grigorescu,, Bucuresti, 2003;
- Dorina N. Rusu, Membrii Academiei Romane, Bucuresti, 2010;
- Lawrence Zeegen & Caroline Roberts,,Laurence King Publishing Ltd, 2014;

== Books ==
- Între linii, memorii, editura RAO 2011
- Strigăte în pustiu, articole, editura RAO 2013
- Rebel, memorii, editura RAO 2016
- Corina, roman, editura RAO 2017
