= Vlad Miriță =

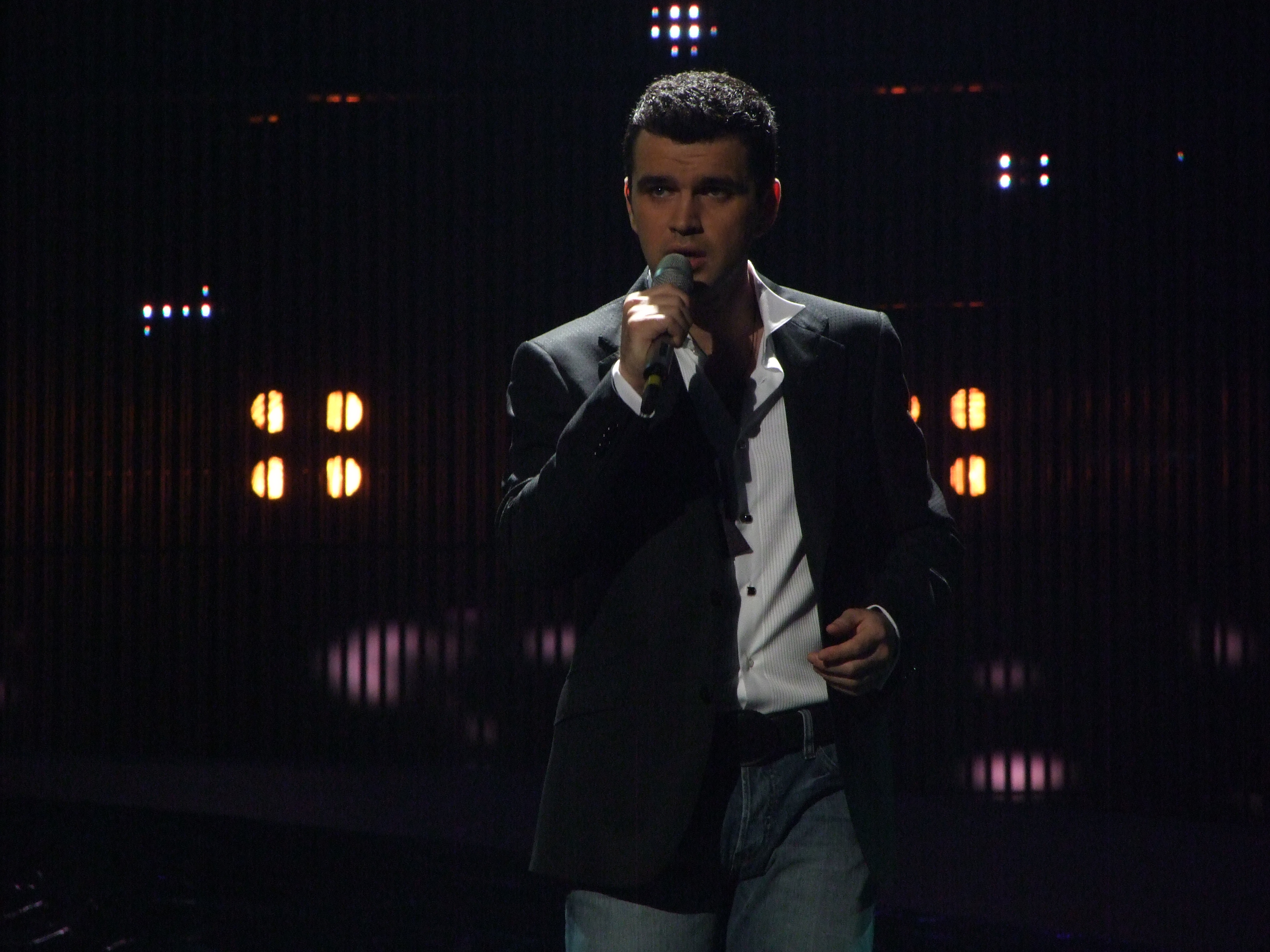

Background information
- Born: Vlad Miriță; 2 August 1981 (age 44); Târgoviște, Romania
- Genres: Pop; opera
- Occupation: Singer
- Instrument: Singing
- Spouse: Maria Natura 2016-present

Vlad Miriță (born 2 August 1981), also known simply as Vlad, is a Romanian pop-opera singer. He represented Romania in the Eurovision Song Contest 2008 alongside Nico.

At the age of 16, he began formal training in music. Throughout his education, he worked with the Armonia Valahă Choir and performed at various national and international events. After receiving private lessons from the famed Maestro Corneliu Fănățeanu in 2001, he joined an Eastern European chamber choir called Madrigal. Vlad went on to win several contests, including Mamaia, the National Pop Festival, in 2002 and was a runner-up in the 2005 International Tenor Voices festival "Traian Grozăvescu", which was held in Lugoj. In 2007 and 2008, Vlad was honored as a scholarship holder of the Opera House Bucharest.

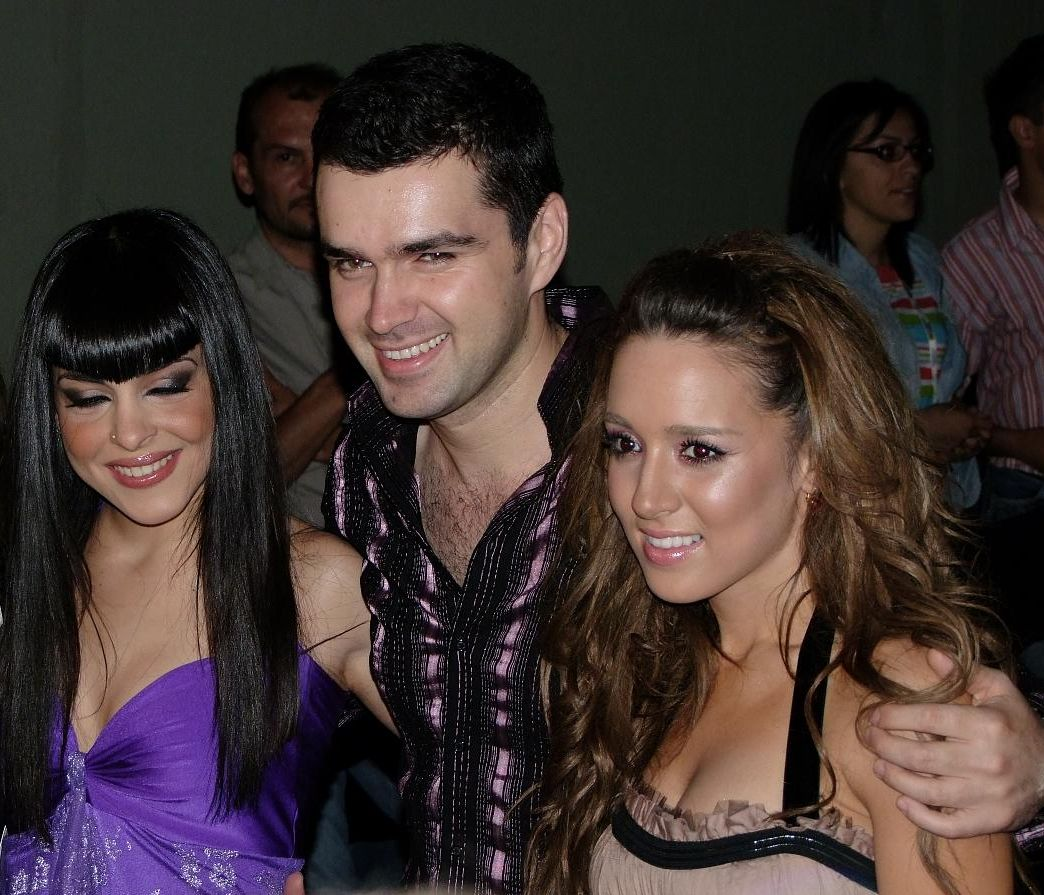
Evdokia Kadi, Vlad Miriță and Kalomira at a party in Belgrade, May 2008

On 20 May 2008, Vlad performed the duet "Pe-o margine de lume" with Nico, another Romanian singer, as that country's entry in the final for the Eurovision Song Contest. They placed 20th that year.

In 2015, the singer was chosen by Walt Disney Pictures to provide the Romanian voice of Hugo in an animated film version of The Hunchback of Notre-Dame.

Later in life he preferred a more family oriented lifestyle. He married Maria Natură in 2016, and the couple celebrated their seventh wedding anniversary in 2023 with a special trip to Bulgaria.

They have a son named Iustin, born in 2018, who, at the age of four, appeared in the music video for Miriță’s Christmas song “E Frumos de Crăciun,” released in December of 2022.

Later in life, he bought a farm in Târgoviște where he raises animals such as pigs and turkeys.

Awards and achievements
Preceded by Todomondo with "Liubi, Liubi, I Love You"	Romania in the Eurovision Song Contest; 2008 (with Nico)	Succeeded by Elena Gheorghe with "The Balkan Girls"
