= Liana Stanciu =

Romanian radio and television presenter (born 1971)

Liana Stanciu (born 24 July 1971) is a Romanian radio and television presenter. She has dysphonia, which gives her voice a special stamp that has contributed to her celebrity status.

She is married to Mihai Georgescu, the lead singer of the band Bere Gratis and together they have a daughter, Teodora, born on 7 December 2005.
