= Leonard Miron =

Romanian journalist

Leonard Miron (born April 11, 1969) is a Romanian television and radio presenter and journalist and works for Romanian National Television (Televiziunea Română).

He was born in Galați, Romania but was brought up in Pitești and graduated from the Carol Davila University of Medicine and Pharmacy before starting a career in media. He speaks fluent English and French, as well as German and Spanish. He has worked on a number of different television programmes, but is best known for presenting music shows and galas such as the national selection for the Eurovision Song Contest.

Since September 2005, he has been living in London, where he has been studying for a Ph.D. in London and working at the same time as a flight attendant for a London-based airline. He returns to Romania weekly, where he presents a range of light entertainment shows. He came out as gay in November 2012.

== Career ==
=== Initial radio and television work ===
Whilst still a medicine student, Miron began presenting a pop music show on the first "free" radio station of post-revolution Romania, Radio Delta/Radio France International. He was approached in 1991 to work as a presenter for Romanian National Television for the youth programme Viața școlii (School Life) and ended up presenting a number of similar shows over the following years including Măseaua de minte (The Wisdom Tooth), Care pe care (loosely translated as Dog Eat Dog), and Veniți cu noi pe programul doi (Join Us on Channel 2), amongst many other shows.

=== Work as journalist and producer ===
As he got older, he branched into other areas of television, whilst still continuing with his love of presenting in front of the camera. Based in the Education and Science department of Romanian National Television, he worked as a reporter and presenter of the medical awareness programme Sănătate pentru toți (Health for All) where he could put to good use his studies as a doctor.

By 2000 he was developing new television ideas, and began producing and hosting light entertainment shows, including Practic matinal (The Practical Morning Show) (2001-2), a late morning magazine, and Vitrina lui Leo (Leo's Showcase) (2003-4), a prime-time chat show.

He has also produced the only programme in Romania aimed directly at people with disabilities, Oameni ca noi (People Like Us) which has been aired weekly since 1999, and has won a number of awards for its innovative approach, including the Romanian national Corporate Citizen and Civic Journalism Award in 1998.

=== Other work ===
Miron also moonlighted as the host for the breakfast show on Romanian National Television for a number of years, often alternating with other hosts from season to season. Ratings dropped with the change of hosts, and he would be asked back to present, only to be changed again after a few months.

He is perhaps best known in his native Romania for hosting galas, whether these be for music contests, award ceremonies or beauty galas. His early TV work concentrated on presenting music shows and since many of the different shows he worked on were live, he became an accomplished live TV host.

Miron has been chosen to host telethons, award ceremonies and other galas. He was asked on a number of occasions to host the popular music Mamaia Festival as well as the international Cerbul de Aur music contest in Brașov. He also presented the national selections for the Eurovision Song Contest and provided the Romanian commentary for the Eurovision Song Contest seven times (between 1998-2001, 2008, 2010, and 2012), he was also the Romanian spokesperson for the Eurovision Song Contest in 2002, 2003 and 2005, where his colourful suits led to BBC's Terry Wogan to call him "Romania's version of Jonathan Ross". He also presented the late night "Dopo Festival" music/talk show (known as Club Callatis at the Callatis Festival in August 2008.

Miron worked on a project to produce a series on Ancient Egypt in 2004/5 and lived in Egypt, where he was an eyewitness to both the 2004 Cairo and 2005 Sharm el Sheik bombings.

During his time spent working as a flight attendant, he was awarded the "Personality of the Year" prize at an annual airline industry award ceremony held in London in February 2008. His work in the airline industry allowed him to visit many countries, including Kenya, where he visited an animal orphanage and adopted a giraffe. He worked as a meet-and-greeter at Barclays Bank in Reading, Berkshire and now is a cruise director for a cruise company.

Starting in 2014 Leonard has worked for Viking River Cruises, one of the biggest river cruise lines in the world. As a Program Director on Viking Embla and Viking Lif, Leonard rapidly gained both respect and popularity among both passengers and crew, and was mentioned in stories in magazines and newspapers in USA, Canada, Australia, and Europe. His popularity increased season after season and in 2017 he was a constant presence in reviews published by the acclaimed website cruisecritic.com

Despite offers for returning on Romanian television as a presenter and producer, Leonard preferred to appear only as a guest in TV shows produces by different TV channels in Romania: ProTV (“La Maruta”), Canal D (“Teo Show” and “WOWBiz”), Antena Stars (“Agentia VIP”) and TVR2 (“Femei de 10, Barbati de 10”).

=== Return to Romanian National Television ===
Having guest presented in a number of shows from 2005 onwards, he started negotiating with the Romanian National Television in late 2006 regarding his return to the TV screens in 2007. He returned to Romania National Television in October 2007 working again for the "Oameni Ca Noi" show, and the breakfast show. He also presented the Christmas Eve gala show Mos Craciun unu' si bun (The one and only Father Christmas) with Gianina Corondan.

From Autumn 2008 to Summer 2009 he presented the Friday edition of a live daytime magazine show targeted towards the female audience called Miezul zilei (Midday)., which meant flying back to Romania from the UK once a week to present the show. From April 2009 he has hosted the health/lifestyle show Rețetă Pentru Siluetă (Recipe for the Figure), together with the dietician Lygia Alexandrescu... During this time, as well as reporting on several events for the TVR news programmes, he was also seen dancing and singing to Romanian folk music on the O Data N-Viata (Once in a Lifetime) show, coming second with just over a third of the televotes.

Autumn 2009 brought back a new series of Rețetă Pentru Siluetă together with two new shows. On TVR1 he presents a weekly lunch-time talk show, Leomania, using some of the elements of "Miezul Zilei", together with new features and a personalised, modern set. He also began presenting Ro Air, a new talk show exclusive to TVR International (TVRi), with an original format of being set in an airport, with guests arriving as "passengers" and Leonard Miron acting as their "head steward" helped by two "stewardesses". In December 2009, Ro Air was voted by viewers as the most popular television show on TVRi and Leonard presented "himself" with the award, since he was also the co-presenter, together with Iuliana Tudor from O Dată N-Viață, of the live awards ceremony where the winner was announced. He also presented a number of Christmas and New Year specials with Irinis Miricioiu called Hai să ne intâlnim sâmbătă seara (Let's meet on Saturday night).
