= List of Spanish musicians =

This is a list of individual musical artists originating from Spain. For groups and bands, see List of bands from Spain. See also Music of Spain.

== A ==
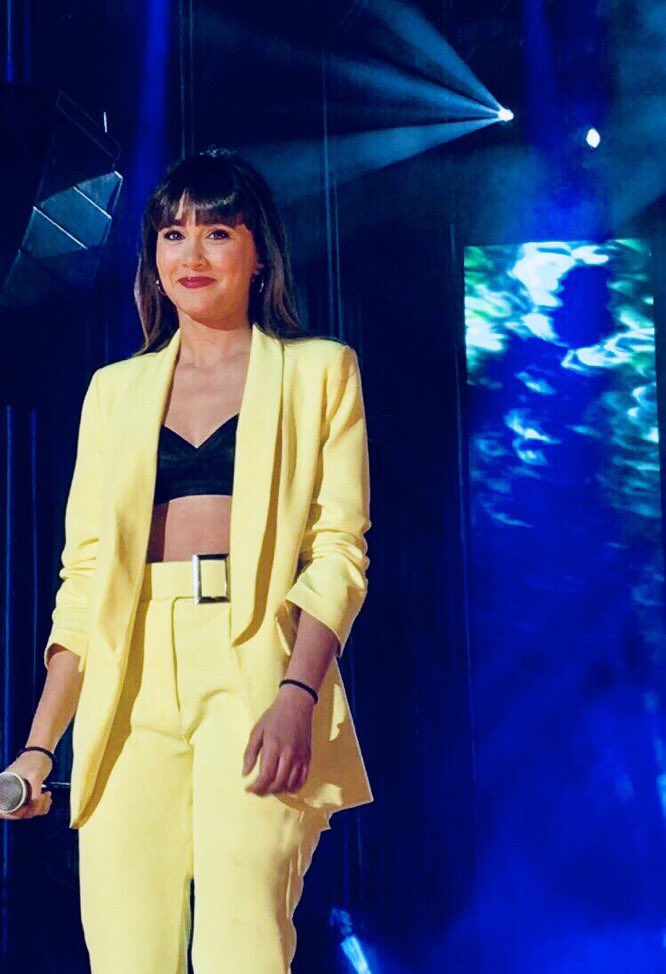
Aitana in Málaga in 2018

- Agoney
- Aid
- Ainhoa Cantalapiedra
- Aitana
- Alaska
- Amaia
- Pablo Alborán
- Edith Alonso
- Eva Amaral
- Remedios Amaya
- Ana Belén
- Soraya Arnelas
- Santiago Auserón
- Luis Eduardo Aute

== B ==
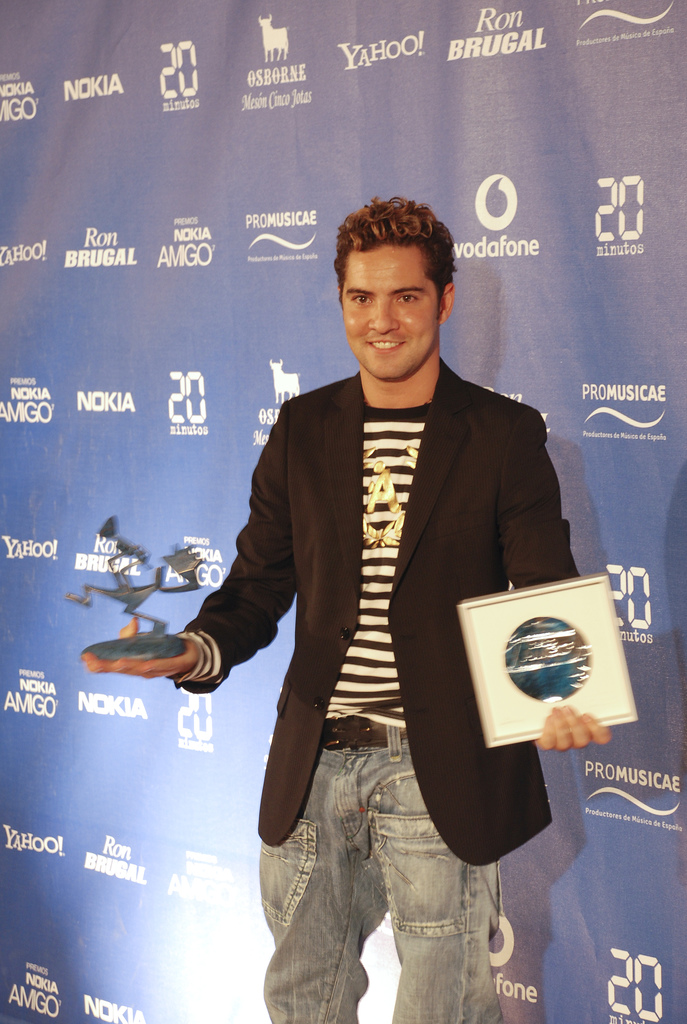
David Bisbal, in 2007

- Barei
- Bebe
- Paloma Berganza
- Teresa Berganza
- Carlos Berlanga
- Beth
- David Bisbal
- Pilar Bogado
- Miguel Bosé
- David Bustamante
- Braulio
- Concha Buika
- Enrique Bunbury

== C ==
- Montserrat Caballé
- Kaydy Cain
- Juan Carlos Calderón
- Camarón de la Isla
- José María Cano
- Nacho Cano
- Blas Cantó
- Nacho Canut
- Manolo Caracol
- Antonio Carbonell
- Antonio Carmona
- Manuel Carrasco
- Alex Cartañá
- José Carreras
- Luz Casal
- Pablo Casals
- Cecilia
- Rosa Cedrón
- Paco Cepero
- Chenoa
- Chanel Terrero
- Chiquetete
- El Chojin
- Diego el Cigala
- David Civera
- Anabel Conde
- Conchita
- Javier Corcobado
- Cristie
- Miguel Cuesta

== D ==
- Sergio Dalma
- Deluxe
- David DeMaria
- Daniel Diges
- Plácido Domingo
- Rocío Dúrcal
- Dareysteel
- Shaila Dúrcal
- Dyango

== E ==
- Edurne
- Mikel Erentxun

== F ==
- El Fary
- Nuria Fergó
- Iván Ferreiro
- Mercedes Ferrer
- Antonio Flores
- Lola Flores
- Lolita Flores
- Rosario Flores
- Silverio Franconetti
- Rafael Frühbeck de Burgos

== G ==
- Elena Gadel
- José Galisteo
- Manolo García
- Luis Antonio García Navarro
- Jorge González
- Quique González
- Ana Guerra
- Pedro Guerra

== H ==
- Pablo Heras-Casado
- Hevia

== I ==
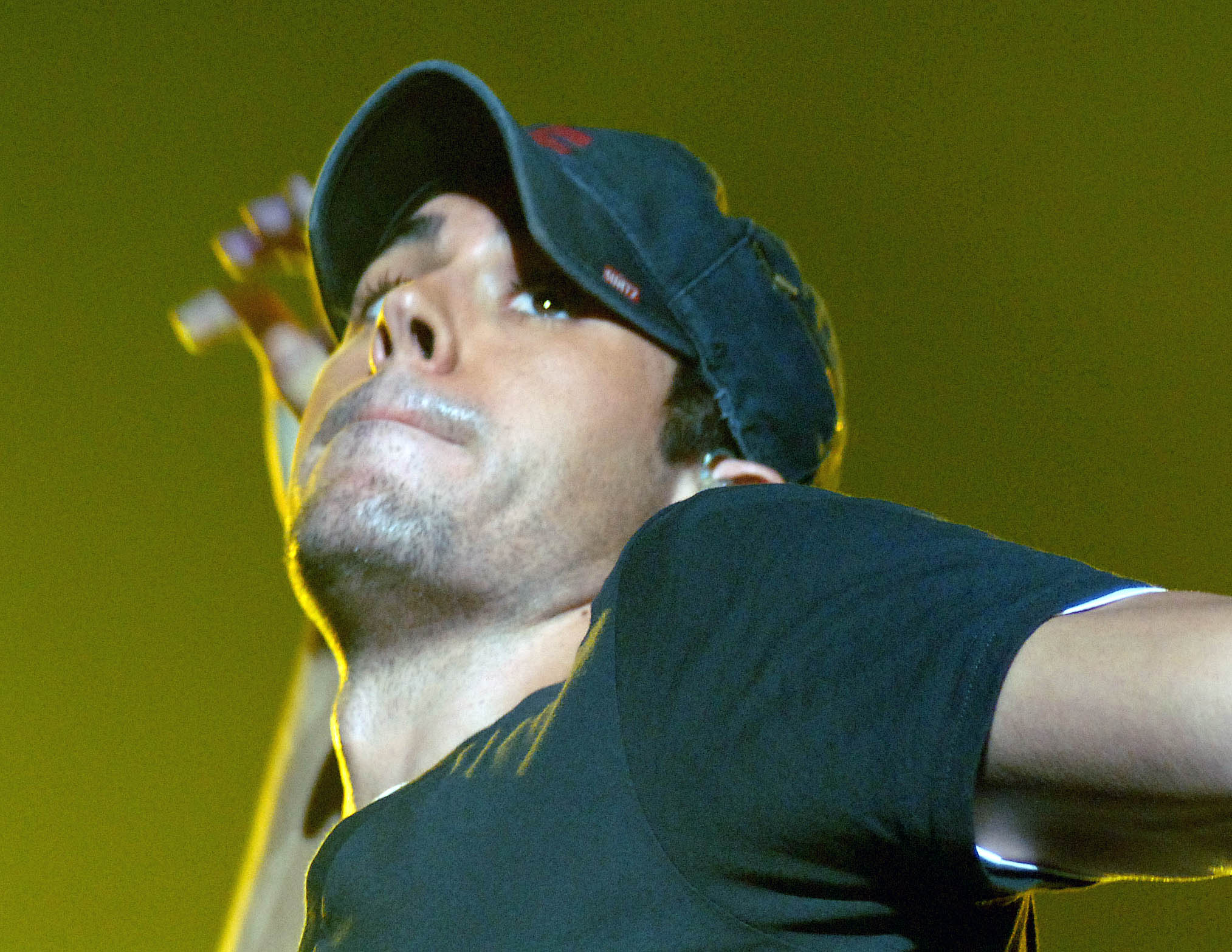
Enrique Iglesias, Vilnius, Lithuania

- Paco Ibáñez
- Idaira
- Enrique Iglesias
- Julio Iglesias
- Julio Iglesias Jr.
- Lola Índigo
- Julián Infante
- Camarón de la Isla
- José Iturbi
- Pedro Iturralde

== J ==
- Jeanette
- Marta Knörr Jiménez (born 1968), Spanish singer
- María Jiménez
- Natalia Jiménez
- Rocío Jurado

== K ==
- Karina
- Alfredo Kraus
- Patricia Kraus

== L ==
- Ana Laan
- José Antonio Labordeta
- Natalia Lacunza
- Vicky Larraz
- Alicia de Larrocha
- El Lebrijano
- Lluis Llach
- Marcos Llunas
- Local 9
- Loquillo
- Rosa López
- Jesús López-Cobos
- Lorena Gómez (born 1986), Spanish singer
- Ruth Lorenzo
- Paco de Lucía
- Pepe de Lucía
- Beatriz Luengo

== M ==
- Virginia Maestro
- Juan Magán
- Malú
- La Mari
- Mari Trini
- Marisol
- Vanesa Martín
- India Martínez
- Leire Martínez
- Massiel
- Melendi
- Raquel Meller
- Mai Meneses
- Merche
- Antonio Molina
- Amaia Montero
- María José Moreno (born 1967), light lyric soprano
- Leticia Moreno
- Enrique Morente
- Jaime Morey

== N ==
- Nach
- Mónica Naranjo
- Nina
- Niño de Elche
- Najwa Nimri
- Sak Noel

== O ==
- Aitana Ocaña Morales
- Antonio Orozco

== P ==
- Isabel Pantoja
- Niña Pastori
- José Luis Perales
- Peret
- el Porta
- María Dolores Pradera

== R ==
- Amalia Ramírez
- Ramón
- Olga Ramos (1918–2005), singer, violinist, and actress
- Raphael
- Alba Reche
- Rels B
- Miguel Ríos
- Josefina Robledo Gallego
- Mala Rodríguez
- Josep Roig Boada
- Danny Romero
- Verónica Romero
- Rosalía
- Raquel del Rosario
- Rosana
- Rosendo
- Christina Rosenvinge
- Rozalén
- Javier Ruibal
- Russian Red

== S ==
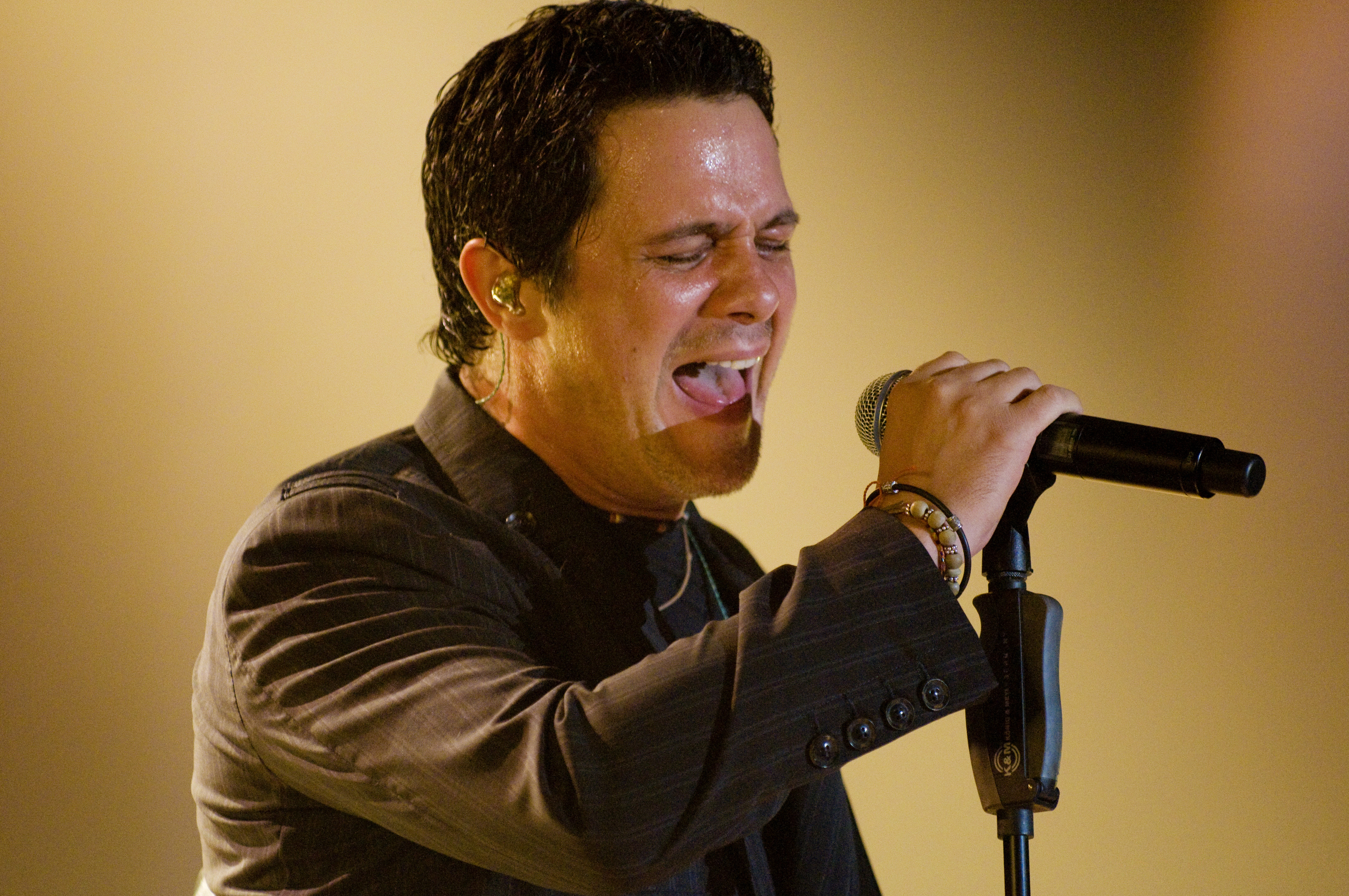
Alejandro Sanz performing on May 28, 2008

- Joaquín Sabina
- Salomé
- Paloma San Basilio
- Marta Sánchez
- Eva Santamaría
- Alejandro Sanz
- Pablo de Sarasate
- Jordi Savall
- Ismael Serrano
- Joan Manuel Serrat
- Camilo Sesto
- La Shica
- Pastora Soler
- David Summers

== T ==
- C. Tangana
- Marta Tchai
- Ana Torroja

== U ==
- Alex Ubago
- Amaya Uranga
- Estíbaliz Uranga
- Izaskun Uranga
- María Uriz (born 1946), operatic soprano

== V ==
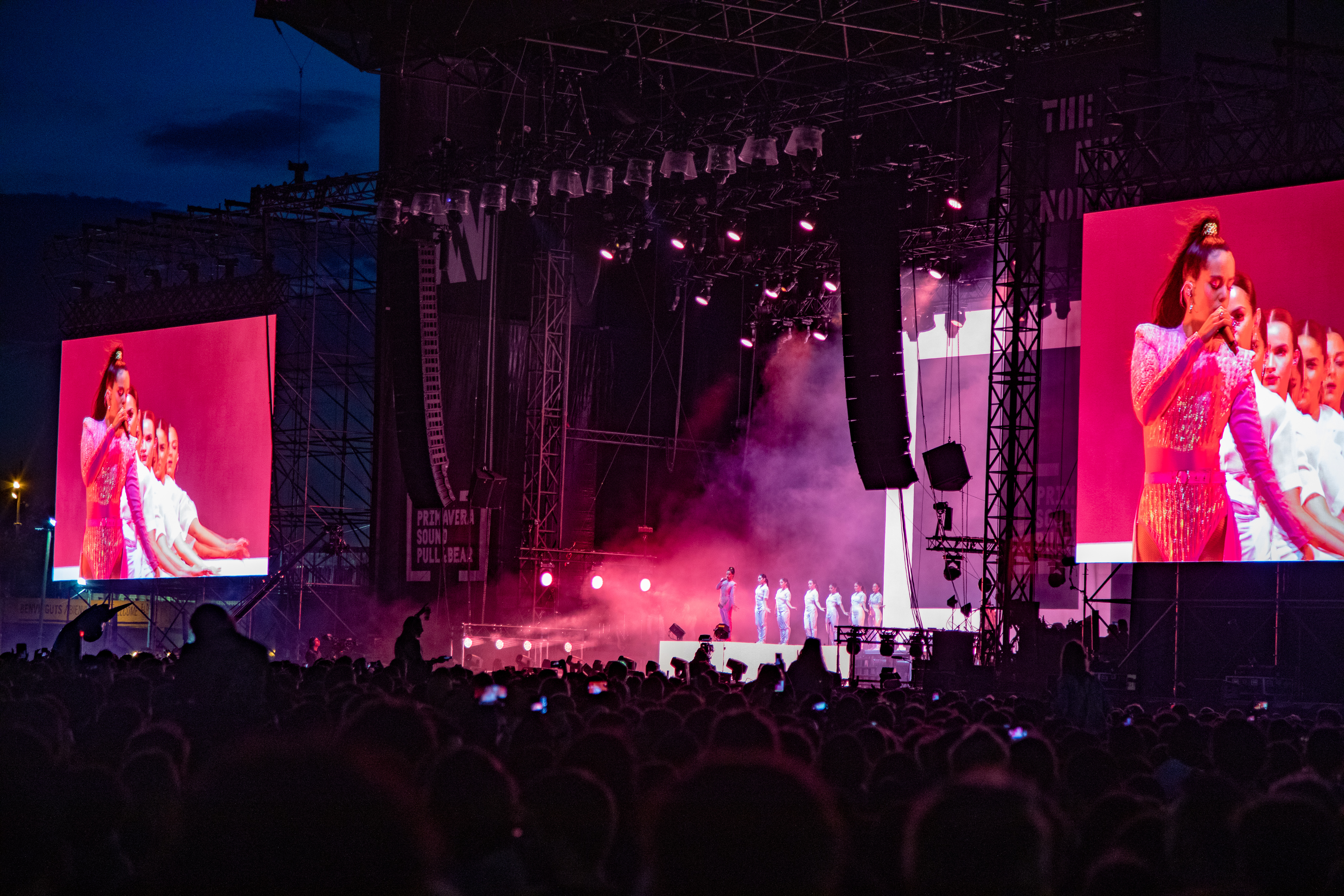
Rosalia

- Cristina del Valle
- Raoul Vázquez
- Antonio Vega
- José Vélez
- Ricardo Viñes
- Víctor Manuel
- Rosalía Vila (born 1993), singer

== W ==
- Leonor Watling

== Z ==
- Serafin Zubiri
- Daniel Zueras
