= Uranga =

Uranga is a surname. Notable people with the surname include:

- Amaya Uranga (born 1947), Spanish singer, member of the Basque folk/pop sextet Mocedades
- Emilio Uranga (1921–1988), Mexican philosopher
- Enoé Uranga (born 1963), Mexican politician
- Estíbaliz Uranga (born 1952), Spanish singer, member of the folk group Mocedades
- Gari Uranga (born 1980), Spanish retired footballer
- Ian Uranga (born 1987), Spanish footballer
- Iban Iriondo Uranga or Iban Iriondo (born 1984), Spanish professional road bicycle racer
- Izaskun Uranga (born 1950), Spanish musician, formed the Spanish folk group Mocedades
- José Antonio de la Hoz Uranga (born 1949), Spanish retired footballer
- Maria de los Remedios Varo Uranga or Remedios Varo (1908–1963), Spanish-Mexican, para-surrealist painter and anarchist
- Martín Uranga (born 1980), former Argentine footballer playing for clubs of Argentina, Chile and El Salvador
- Mikel Zarrabeitia Uranga (born 1970), Spanish former road bicycle racer
- Nancy Uranga (1954–1976), Cuban fencer
- Pablo Uranga (1861–1934), Spanish painter born in Gasteiz

== See also ==
- Uranga, Santa Fe, small town in Santa Fe, Argentina
- Raúl Uranga – Carlos Sylvestre Begnis Subfluvial Tunnel, an underwater road tunnel that connects Entre Ríos and Santa Fe in Argentina
- Uranga-o-te-rā, the fifth lowest level of the underworld, ruled by Rohe, the wife of Māui
- Ranga (disambiguation)
- Suranga
- Urana
- Urangela
