= Spain in the Eurovision Song Contest 1993 =

- Eurovision Song Contest 1993
- Participating broadcaster: Televisión Española (TVE)
- Country: Spain
- Selection process: Internal selection
- Announcement date: 15 April 1993

Competing entry
- Song: "Hombres"
- Artist: Eva Santamaría
- Songwriter: Carlos Toro

Placement
- Final result: 11th, 58 points

Participation chronology

Spain was represented at the Eurovision Song Contest 1993 with the song "Hombres", written by Carlos Toro, and performed by Eva Santamaría. The Spanish participating broadcaster, Televisión Española (TVE), internally selected its entry for the contest. The song, performed in position 22, placed eleventh out of twenty-five competing entries with 58 points.

== Before Eurovision ==
Televisión Española (TVE) internally selected "Hombres" performed by Eva Santamaría as its entry for the Eurovision Song Contest 1993. The song was written by Carlos Toro. The song, songwriter, and performer were presented on 15 April 1993. The lyrics of the song included the word "sex" for the first time in the history of the contest.

== At Eurovision ==
On 15 May 1993, the Eurovision Song Contest was held at the Green Glens Arena in Millstreet hosted by Radio Telefís Éireann (RTÉ), and broadcast live throughout the continent. Santamaría performed "Hombres" 22nd in the running order, following Croatia and preceding Cyprus. She was accompanied on stage by Joaquín Eduardo López, Eva Muedra, and Francisco Santiago López as backing dancers, and by Kenny O'Brien and Leyla Hoyle as backing singers. She was dressed for the occasion by Victorio & Lucchino. Eduardo Leiva conducted the event's orchestra performance of the Spanish entry. At the close of the voting "Hombres" had received 58 points, placing 11th of 25.

TVE broadcast the contest in Spain on La Primera with commentary by José Luis Uribarri. Before the event, TVE aired a talk show hosted by Ángeles Martín introducing the Spanish jury, which continued after the contest commenting on the results.

=== Voting ===
TVE assembled a jury panel with sixteen members. The following members comprised the Spanish jury:

- Cristina Pons – student
- Juan Ribera – physician
- Arancha de Benito – television presenter
- Sergio Blanco – singer, represented Spain in 1975 as part of Sergio y Estíbaliz
- Estíbaliz Uranga – singer, represented Spain in 1975 as part of Sergio y Estíbaliz
- Manel Quinto – writer and film critic
- Rosita Ferrer – actress
- Antonio Rebollo – archer
- Miguel Ángel Bermejo – film and advertising producer
- Annabelle Aramburu – radio and television scriptwriter
- Bernardo Bonezzi – composer
- María Luisa San José – actress
- Francesc Martínez de Foix – president of Special Olympics Spain
- Rosi Nsue – dancer
- René Dechamps – student
- Concha Márquez Piquer – singer

The jury was chaired by Enric Frigola. The jury awarded its maximum of 12 points to Portugal.

Points awarded to Spain
Score	Country
12 points	
10 points	Finland
8 points	Malta
7 points	Croatia
6 points	Bosnia and Herzegovina; Switzerland
5 points	Belgium; Cyprus; Italy
4 points	
3 points	
2 points	Austria; Slovenia
1 point	Israel; Norway

Points awarded by Spain
Score	Country
12 points	Portugal
10 points	Ireland
8 points	Greece
7 points	Netherlands
6 points	Turkey
5 points	United Kingdom
4 points	Malta
3 points	Switzerland
2 points	Italy
1 point	Croatia
