= Bogado =

Bogado is a surname. Notable people with the surname include:

- Ariel Bogado, Paraguayan footballer
- Cristian Bogado, Paraguayan footballer
- Diego Bogado, Argentine footballer
- Emiliano Bogado, Argentine footballer
- Floro Bogado, Argentine politician, lawyer and diplomat
- Juan Mathias Bogado, Argentine footballer
- Mariangee Bogado, Venezuelan softball player
- Martín Bogado, Argentine rugby union player
- Mauro Bogado, Argentine footballer
- Pilar Bogado, Spanish singer
- Rolando Bogado, Paraguayan footballer

== See also ==
- 4269 Bogado, main-belt asteroid
