= Eres tú =

1973 song by Mocedades

- Belgian release cover

Single by Mocedades

from the album Mocedades 4
- Language: Spanish
- B-side: "Recuerdos de mocedad"
- Released: March 1973
- Genre: Canción melódica; Europop
- Length: 3:36
- Label: Novola / Zafiro
- Songwriter: Juan Carlos Calderón
- Producer: Juan Carlos Calderón

Music video
- "Eres tú" on YouTube

Eurovision Song Contest 1973 entry
- Country: Spain
- Artists: Amaya Uranga; Roberto Uranga; Izaskun Uranga; Carlos Zubiaga; Javier Garay; José Ipiña
- As: Mocedades
- Language: Spanish
- Composer: Juan Carlos Calderón
- Lyricist: Juan Carlos Calderón
- Conductor: Juan Carlos Calderón

Finals performance
- Final result: 2nd
- Final points: 125

Entry chronology
- ◄ "Amanece" (1972)
- "Canta y sé feliz" (1974) ►

"Eres tú" (Spanish pronunciation: [ˈeɾes ˈtu]; "It's You") is a song recorded by Spanish band Mocedades, written by Juan Carlos Calderón. It represented Spain in the Eurovision Song Contest 1973 held in Luxembourg placing second which was followed by a global success. It was also Spain's highest scoring entry at the time, a record that remained until the 2022 edition when Chanel finished in 3rd place with SloMo.

It is one of the few musical acts from Spain to have scored a top 10 hit in the United States, being the only one sung entirely in Spanish. In 2005, it was one of 14 songs chosen to compete in Congratulations: 50 Years of the Eurovision Song Contest placing eleventh. In 2013, it was inducted into the Latin Grammy Hall of Fame. In 2015, "Eres tú" ranked No. 47 on Billboard's 50 Greatest Latin Songs of All Time.

Mocedades also released the song in English, French, German, Italian, and Basque versions. The song was subsequently covered many times and released by different singers in different languages and genres.

== Background ==
=== Conception ===
Juan Carlos Calderón wrote "Eres tú" and Mocedades recorded it for their fourth studio album Mocedades 4. The group was composed of Amaya Uranga, Roberto Uranga, Izaskun Uranga, Carlos Zubiaga, Javier Garay, and José Ipiña.

In addition to the Spanish language original version, the group released the song in English as "Touch the Wind" with lyrics by Mike Hawker, French as "C'est pour toi" with lyrics by Michel Delancray and Mya Simille, German as "Das Bist Du" with lyrics by Fred Jay, Italian as "Viva Noi" with lyrics by Paolo Limiti, and Basque as "Zu Zera" with lyrics by Luis Iriondo Etxaniz.

=== Eurovision ===
Televisión Española (TVE) internally selected the song as its entrant for the 18th edition of the Eurovision Song Contest. For the song to participate in the contest, it was necessary to shorten it so that it fit into three minutes. TVE filmed a video clip with the group singing the song in a studio that was distributed to the other participant broadcasters as established by the contest regulations.

On 7 April 1973, the Eurovision Song Contest was held at Grand Théâtre in Luxembourg hosted by the Compagnie Luxembourgeoise de Télédiffusion (CLT), and broadcast live throughout the continent. Mocedades performed "Eres tú" seventh on the night, following Monaco's "Un train qui part" by Marie and preceding Switzerland's "Je vais me marier, Marie" by Patrick Juvet. Calderón himself conducted the event's live orchestra in the performance of the Spanish entry.

At the close of voting, the song had received 125 points, placing second in a field of seventeen, after Luxembourg's "Tu te reconnaîtras" by Anne-Marie David with 129 points. The United Kingdom's "Power to All Our Friends" by Cliff Richard finished third with 123 points. This was Spain's best-scoring song at the contest at the time. This record was taken in 2022 when the nation placed third with Chanel and SloMo. "Eres tú" was succeeded as Spanish representative at the 1974 contest by "Canta y sé feliz" by Peret.

=== Plagiarism controversy ===
One of the biggest scandals at Eurovision resulted from the perceived similarity between the melody of "Eres tú" and that of Yugoslavia's 1966 entry "Brez besed". However, the authors of "Brez besed" neither officially complained nor filed a lawsuit, as neither was common practice at the time.

=== Aftermath ===
Its participation in Eurovision was followed by a global success. In 1974, "Eres tú" became one of the few Spanish language songs to reach the top 10 in the United States, peaking at #9 in the Billboard Hot 100 chart and also reaching the top 10 on the Adult Contemporary chart. In the United States, it is still heard on Adult Standards and Easy Listening radio. The B-side of the single released in some countries was the English-language version entitled "Touch the Wind", which featured a completely different set of lyrics by Mike Hawker, rather than a translation of the original Spanish lyrics. Radio stations generally preferred to play the original A-side version. There were also several covers of the song in both English and Spanish, only one of which -– "Touch the Wind" by Eydie Gorme -- charted, becoming a minor Adult Contemporary hit.

With "Eres tú", Mocedades is one of the five musical acts from Spain to have scored a top ten hit in the United States, (Note: The other four acts from Spain are Los Bravos, Julio Iglesias, Enrique Iglesias, and Los del Río with "Macarena") and the only to have a top ten hit sung entirely in Spanish. (Note: The version of Los del Río's "Macarena" was a remix by the Bayside Boys with English vocals) The song was inducted into the Latin Grammy Hall of Fame in 2013. In 2015, "Eres tú" ranked #47 on Billboard's 50 Greatest Latin Songs of All Time.

The success of "Eres tú" was not limited to just pop or Spanish music radio. In 1976, a guitar instrumental by country singer Sonny James reached #67 on the Hot Country Singles chart. In 1977, Tex-Mex country singer Johnny Rodriguez –who had earlier success with mixing English and Spanish lyrics in his songs– recorded a cover version and released it to country radio. The song peaked at #25 in the fall of 1977 on the Hot Country Singles chart.

"Eres tú" was one of fourteen songs chosen by Eurovision fans and a European Broadcasting Union (EBU) reference group, from among the 992 songs that had ever participated in the contest, to participate in the fiftieth anniversary competition Congratulations: 50 Years of the Eurovision Song Contest held on 22 October 2005 in Copenhagen. It was the only Spanish entry featured, as well as one of three entries featured that did not actually win the contest the year it competed. The song was featured with footage of Mocedades' Eurovision performance with Amaya Uranga, Carlos Zubiaga, and José Ipiña appearing live on stage towards the end. The song placed eleventh with 90 point, being eliminated in the first round. On 31 March 2015, "Eres tú" was performed by Rosa López in the contest sixtieth anniversary show Eurovision Song Contest's Greatest Hits. (Note: She performed "Eres tú" in a medley with other three Spanish entries: "La, la, la", "Vivo cantando", and "Europe's Living a Celebration".)

== Chart history ==
=== Weekly charts ===
Chart (1974)	Peak position
Australia (Kent Music Report)	30
Belgium (Ultratop 50 Flanders)	8
Belgium (Ultratop 50 Wallonia)	25
Canada Top Singles (RPM)	6
Canada Adult Contemporary (RPM)	6
Finland (Suomen virallinen lista)	11
France (IFOP)	59
Germany (GfK)	15
Iceland (Morgunblaðið)	6
Netherlands (Dutch Top 40)	3
Netherlands (Single Top 100)	3
New Zealand (Listener)	3
Norway (VG-lista)	8
Spain (AFYVE)	1
Sweden (Kvällstoppen)	4
US Billboard Hot 100	9
US Adult Contemporary (Billboard)	8
US Cash Box Top 100	9

=== Year-end charts ===
Chart (1974)	Rank
Australia	147
Canada RPM Top Singles	66
US Billboard Hot 100	62
US Cash Box	79

== Sales ==
Sales for "Eres tú"
Region	Certification	Certified units/sales
Spain	—	300,000
United States	—	1,000,000

== Song in other languages ==
=== By Mocedades ===
- "Eres tú" (Spanish)
- "Touch the Wind" (English)
- "Das bist du" (German)
- "C'est pour toi" (French)
- "Viva noi" (Italian)
- "Zu zara" (Basque)

=== By other groups ===
- "Dicht bij jou" (Dutch)
- "Rør Ved Mig" (Danish)
- "Touch the Wind" (English)
- "I mitt liv" (Norwegian)
- "Rör vid mig" (Swedish)
- "Správný tón" (Czech)
- "Eres tú" (Morat; Spanish, Colombia)
- "Runoni kaunein olla voit" (Finnish)
- "Sinä vain" (Finnish)
- "Co gai rung mo" (Vietnamese)
- "That's You" (English)
- "Will My Love Be You" (English)
- "C'est pour toi" (French)
- "Jy's vir my" (Afrikaans)
- "É você" (Brazilian Portuguese)
- "Du bist wie die Sonne" (German)
- "Waar naartoe" (Dutch)
- "Selline sa oled" (Estonian)
- "그대 있는 곳까지" (Korean)

== Legacy ==
=== Cover versions ===
"Eres tú"

Single by Johnny Rodriguez

from the album Practice Makes Perfect
- B-side: "You Put A Hold On Me"
- Released: September 1977
- Recorded: February 16, 1977
- Genre: Country
- Length: 3:02
- Label: Mercury 55004
- Songwriter: Juan Carlos Calderón
- Producer: Jerry Kennedy

Johnny Rodriguez singles chronology
"If Practice Makes Perfect" (1977)	"Eres tú" (1977)	"Savin' This Love Song for You" (1977)

"Eres tú"

Single by Luis Miguel

from the album Soy Como Quiero Ser
- Released: 1988
- Genre: Latin ballad
- Label: WEA Latina
- Songwriter: Juan Carlos Calderón
- Producer: Juan Carlos Calderón

Luis Miguel singles chronology
"Yo que no vivo sin tí" (1988)	"Eres tú" (1988)	"Sólo tú" (1988)

Music video
- "Eres tú" on YouTube

"Eres tú"

Single by Il Divo

from the album Amor & Pasión
- Released: November 2015
- Recorded: 2015, Mexico
- Genre: Classical crossover
- Label: Sonic; Syco; Columbia
- Songwriter: Juan Carlos Calderón
- Producer: Julio Reyes Copello

Music video
- "Eres tú" on YouTube

- 101 Strings — "Eres tú"
- Acker Bilk — "Eres tú"
- Aida Vedishcheva — "Только ты" (Russian)
- Al estilo de Mocedades — "Eres tú"
- Alvaro Clemente — "Eres tú"
- Amaya Uranga & Juan Carlos Calderón — "Eres tú"
- Anacani — "Eres tú"
- Andrés Calamaro — "Eres tú"
- An & Jan (Rot) — "Dicht bij jou" (Dutch)
- Atalaje — "Eres tú"
- Austin Kelley & Mantovani — "Eres tú"
- Bedevilers — "Eres tú" (punk rock)
- Bert Kaempfert — "Touch the Wind" (English)
- Bertín Osborne — "Eres tú"
- Bing Crosby — "Eres tú" (included in his 1975 album Bingo Viejo)
- Bo Doerek — "Eres tú"
- Bres Bezed — "Eres tú"
- Bullerfnis — "Rør ved mig" (Danish)
- Byron Lee and the Dragonaries — "Eres tú"
- Calito Soul — "Eres tú"
- Camila Mendes — "Eres tú" (Riverdale)
- Cerveza Mahou — "Eres tú"
- Charo — "Eres tú"
- Collage — "Selline sa oled" (Estonian)
- Daniela Castillo — "Eres tú"
- Dansk top — "Rør Ved Mig" (Danish)
- David and the High Spirits — "Eres tú"
- Eydie Gormé — "Eres tú"
- Eydie Gormé — "Touch the Wind" (1973 B-side)
- El Chaval De La Peca — "Eres tú"
- El Consorcio — "Eres tú"
- El Frenillo de Gaugin — "Eres tú" (punk rock)
- El ser y ser — "Eres tú" (rap)
- Ennio Emmanuel — "Eres tú" (Spanish)
- Estela Raval — "Eres tú" (Argentine Spanish)
- Ex Masters — "San joe taigie mie" (Surinamese)
- Floyd Cramer — "Touch the Wind" (English)
- Gé Korsten — "Touch the Wind" (English)
- Gebroeder Brouwer — "Eres tú" (Trumpet instrumental)
- GrupoSarao — "Eres tú"
- Hella Joof & Peter Frödin — "Rør ved mig" (Danish)
- Howard Morrison Chor — "Eres tú"
- III of a Kind Philippines — "Eres tú"
- Ilanit — "Eres tú"
- Il Divo, "Eres tú" (2015).
- Inger Lise Rypdal — "I mitt liv" (Norwegian)
- Inger Öst — "Rör vid mig" (Swedish)
- Jimmy Mitchell — "Eres tú" (Spanish with Texan accent)
- Johnny Mathis and Juan Carlos Calderón — "Touch the Wind" (English with Spanish chorus)
- Johnny Reimar — "Rør ved mig" (Danish)
- Johnny Rodriguez — "Eres tú"
- Josh Santana — "Eres tú" (Philippines 2009)
- Juan Carlos Calderón — "Eres tú" (composer version)
- Justo Lamas — "Eres tú"
- Karel Gott, Spravny Ton — "Eres tú" (Czech)
- Kathy Kelly — "Eres tú"
- Katri Helena — "Runoni kaunein olla voit" (Finnish)
- Katri Helena — "Sinä vain" (Finnish)
- The Kelly Family — "Eres tú" on Honest Workers (1991)
- Khanh Hà — "Cô gái rừng mơ" (Vietnamese)
- Korean Choir — "Eres tú"
- La Academia 4ta Generación — "Eres tú"
- La Década Prodigiosa — "Eres tú"
- Lady Lu — "Eres tú"
- Landscape — "Touch the Wind" (English)
- Lecia & Lucienne — "Rør ved mig" (Danish)
- Lettermen — "Eres tú"
- Liceo Panamericano — "Eres tú"
- Little Angels of Korea — "Eres tú"
- Lola Ponce — "Eres tú"
- Luis Chacón — "Eres tú"
- Luis Miguel — "Eres tú" (produced by Calderón)
- Lupita D'Alessio — "Eres tú"
- Luz Casal — "Eres tú"
- Mantovani Orchestra — "Eres tú"
- Mariachi Vargas — "Eres tú"
- Mona — I mitt liv (Norwegian)
- Nana Mouskouri — "Touch the Wind" (English)
- Pandora — "Eres tú"
- Patricia Y Los Stars — "Eres tú"
- Patti Donelli @ USC-Pgh — "Touch the Wind" (English)
- Percy Faith — "Touch the Wind" (English)
- Perry Como — "Eres tu" (April 29, 1974)
- Perry Como — "That's You" (English)
- Perpetuum Jazzile — "Brez besed"/"Eres tú" (ironic medley of Eres tu with the song Calderón was accused of copying)
- Petula Clark — "Will My Love Be You" (English)
- Pistas — "Eres tú" (Panflute)
- Ray Conniff — "Eres tú"
- Reggae Chico Man — "Eres tú"
- Rika Zarai — "C'est pour toi" (French)
- Rina Hugo — "Jy's vir my" (Afrikaans)
- Roberto Delgado — "Eres tú" (Instrumental)
- Rob's Band — "Eres tú"
- Romantica de Xalapa — "Eres tú"
- Sandy Caldera — "Eres tú"
- Self Help Marines — "Eres Tu" — steel band instrumental version*
- Sonny James — "Eres tú"
- Soul Sanet — "Eres tú"
- Stef Meeder — "Tweedle dee", "Eres tú" (instrumental medley)
- Las Supremas de Móstoles — "Eres tú"
- Sweethearts — "Rør ved mig" (Danish)
- TBC — "Rør ved mig" (Danish Rap)
- Thalía — "Tómame o déjame"
- The Mockers — "Eres tú"
- Tish Hinojosa — "Eres tú"
- Trigo Limpio Nueva Era — "Eres tú" (live)
- Volkana — Eurovision medley including "Eres tú"
- Wheeler St James — "Touch the Wind" (English)
- Willeke Alberti — "Waar naartoe" (Dutch)
- Zereno — "Eres tú"
- Verda Sümer & İstanbul Gelişim Orkestrası — "Eski dostlar ne oldu" (Turkish)

=== In other media ===
- The theme from the song's chorus, with new English lyrics, was used by Yamaha Music in Australia for its advertisements during the 1970s and 80s.
- A guitar instrumental version of "Eres tú" was used in a Bank of New Zealand television campaign in the 1990s.
- In the 1995 movie Tommy Boy, there's a scene in which Chris Farley and David Spade sing the original Spanish version of "Eres tú" while presumably returning to Ohio.
- The cast of Dutch series 't Spaanse Schaep, about a Spanish hotel run by 1970s expatriates, performed the song as "Er is toe" ("Dessert is Ready").
- In the web series Jake and Amir, Amir sings this song to Jake after getting back from a trip to Mexico.

== See also ==
- List of best-selling Latin singles

== Sources and external links ==
- Official Eurovision Song Contest 1973 site.
- Detailed info and lyrics, "Eres tú". The Diggiloo Thrush
- Official Mocedades site: "Eres tú" lyrics, "Eres tú" English translation, "Touch the Wind" lyrics
- "Eres tú" / "Recuerdos de mocedad" at Discogs (list of releases)
- "Eres tú" / "Dime Señor" at Discogs (list of releases)
