= Sergio and Estíbaliz =

Spanish vocal duo

- Origin: Bilbao (Biscay), Spain
- Years active: 1972-1993
- Members: Sergio Blanco Rivas; Estíbaliz Uranga Amézaga

Sergio and Estíbaliz were a Spanish vocal duo, formed by Sergio Blanco Rivas (17 November 1948 – 15 February 2015) and Estíbaliz Uranga Amézaga (born 9 December 1952) who also worked with groups Mocedades and El Consorcio. They were also known for their participation in the Eurovision Song Contest 1975. Both were born in Bilbao.

Having met in 1968, the couple joined vocal group Mocedades, with whom they recorded three albums before leaving in 1972 to concentrate on a career as a duo. They released their first self-titled album the following year, which proved a success and was followed by further albums at approximately yearly intervals throughout the 1970s.

In 1975 Sergio and Estíbaliz were chosen internally by broadcaster Televisión Española as the Spanish representatives for that year's Eurovision Song Contest with the song "Tú volverás" ("You Will Return"). At the 20th Eurovision Song Contest, held in Stockholm on 22 March, "Tú volverás" placed 10th of the 19 entries. The song became a major hit both in Spain and Latin America, where they became very popular, leading to the release of an album of Latin American songs in 1977.

The couple had married in 1975, and took a career break in the early 1980s during which Estíbaliz gave birth to a daughter. Returning in 1983, they again began releasing albums on a regular basis, with 1985's Cuidado con la noche proving the most successful of their career. Their last album as a duo was released in 1992.

Since 1993 the duo were members of the group El Consorcio which also includes former Mocedades members Amaya and Iñaki Uranga (sister and brother to Estíbaliz) and Carlos Zubiaga. They released eight albums as members of El Consorcio. In 2013, Sergio left El Consorcio due to a "serious illness". El Consorcio began a farewell tour in 2014.

Sergio Blanco died on 15 February 2015 in Tres Cantos, Community of Madrid, at the age of 66.

== Albums discography ==
With Mocedades

- 1969: Pange Lingua
- 1970: Más allá
- 1971: Otoño

Sergio and Estíbaliz

- 1973: Sergio y Estíbaliz
- 1974: Piel
- 1975: Tú volverás
- 1976: Quién compra una canción
- 1976: Queda más vida
- 1977: Canciones sudamericanas
- 1979: Beans
- 1983: Agua
- 1985: Cuidado con la noche
- 1986: Sí señor
- 1988: Déjame vivir con alegría
- 1989: De par en par
- 1992: Planeta Tierra

With El Consorcio

- 1994: Lo que nunca muere
- 1995: Peticiones del oyente
- 1996: Programa doble
- 1998: Cuba
- 2000: Las canciones de mi vida
- 2003: En vivo desde el corazón de México
- 2005: De ida y vuelta
- 2008: Querido Juan

Preceded by Peret with "Canta y sé feliz"	Spain in the Eurovision Song Contest; 1975	Succeeded by Braulio with "Sobran las palabras"
