= Cyprus in the Eurovision Song Contest 1993 =

- Eurovision Song Contest 1993
- Participating broadcaster: Cyprus Broadcasting Corporation (CyBC)
- Country: Cyprus
- Selection process: Diagonismós Tragoudioú Giourovízion Epilogí Tis Kypriakís Symmetochís
- Selection date: 23 March 1993

Competing entry
- Song: "Mi stamatas"
- Artist: Zymboulakis and Van Beke
- Songwriters: Aristos Moschovakis; Rodoula Papalambrianou

Placement
- Final result: 19th, 17 points

Participation chronology

Cyprus was represented at the Eurovision Song Contest 1993 with the song "Mi stamatas", composed by Aristos Moschovakis, with lyrics by Rodoula Papalambrianou, and performed by Zymboulakis and Van Beke. The Cypriot participating broadcaster, the Cyprus Broadcasting Corporation (CyBC), selected its entry through a national final.

== Before Eurovision ==
=== Diagonismós Tragoudioú Giourovízion Epilogí Tis Kypriakís Symmetochís ===
==== Competing entries ====
The Cyprus Broadcasting Corporation (CyBC) opened a submission period for Cypriot artists and composers to submit songs until 29 January 1993. By the end of the submission period, 78 entries had been submitted. On 21 February 1993, in one of the radio rooms at the CyBC studios, a 9-member jury listened to the received submissions and chose eight songs to compete in the national final.

Competing entry selection jury members
- Maria Papaloizou
- Gianna Loizidou
- Aristos Prokopiou
- Manos Mouseos
- Lefteris Karagiorgis
- Lygia Konstantinidou
- Sofia Mouaimi
- Marios Skordis
- Mamas Chatziantonis

==== Final ====
The final was broadcast live at 21:00 (EET) on RIK 1 on 23 March 1993 in a show titled Diagonismós Tragoudioú Giourovízion Epilogí Tis Kypriakís Symmetochís (Greek: Διαγωνισμός Τραγουδιού Γιουροβίζιον Επιλογή Της Κυπριακής Συμμετοχής). The contest was held at the International Conference Centre in Nicosia, and was hosted by Marina Maleni. The running order was decided by a random draw which was done in the presence of the songwriters of the competing entries. The results were decided by a 24-member jury.

Final – 23 March 1993
R/O	Artist	Song	Songwriter(s)	Points	Place
1	Alex Panayi	"Gia sena tragoudo" (Για σένα τραγουδώ)	Alex Panayi	141	3
2	Loukas Chamatsos	"Monos ki apopse" (Μόνος κι απόψε)	Gregory Geryan, Soulla Orfanidou	103	5
3	Charis Koutsavakis	"Tha perimeno" (Θα περιμένω)	Charis Koutsavakis, Michalis Papyrou	48	8
4	Marietta Mitsidou	"Nychta" (Νύχτα)	Filippos de Kastan, Glafkos Efstathiou	180	2
5	Gianna Panagidou	"Olou tou kosmou ta paidia" (Όλου του κόσμου τα παιδιά)	Marios Oikonomidis, Giorgos Xynaris	61	7
6	Katerina Chartosia-Logotheti	"Anisycho" (Ανησυχώ)	Katerina Chartosia-Logotheti	93	6
7	Kyriakos Zymboulakis & Dimos Van Beke	"Mi stamatas" (Μη σταματάς)	Aristos Moschovakis, Rodoula Papalambrianou	198	1
8	Elena Peta	"Nostalgia" (Νοσταλγία)	Petrou Giannaki	112	4

== At Eurovision ==
On the night of the final, Kyriakos Zymboulakis and Dimos Van Beke (performing mononymously as Zymboulakis and Van Beke respectively) performed 23rd in the running order, following Spain and preceding Israel. At the closing of the voting, "Mi stamatas" had received 17 points, placing Cyprus 19th out of 25 competing countries. The Cypriot jury awarded its 12 points to Greece.

In the summer of 1993 the European Broadcasting Union (EBU) confirmed that the seven lowest-scoring countries in the Eurovision Song Contest 1993 would be barred from entering the 1994 contest, to make way for seven countries which would participate for the first time. As Cyprus had placed in the bottom seven, the country was unable to compete in the 1994 Eurovision Song Contest. However, later in 1993 Italy's broadcaster RAI subsequently announced that it would not participate in the event, leading to Cyprus being readmitted as the relegated country with the best result at the 1993 contest.

=== Voting ===
Points awarded to Cyprus
Score	Country
12 points	
10 points	Greece
8 points	
7 points	
6 points	
5 points	United Kingdom
4 points	
3 points	
2 points	Denmark
1 point	

Points awarded by Cyprus
Score	Country
12 points	Greece
10 points	France
8 points	Norway
7 points	Ireland
6 points	Switzerland
5 points	Spain
4 points	United Kingdom
3 points	Portugal
2 points	Iceland
1 point	Malta
