= Sara Sharon =

Israeli singer

- שרה שרון
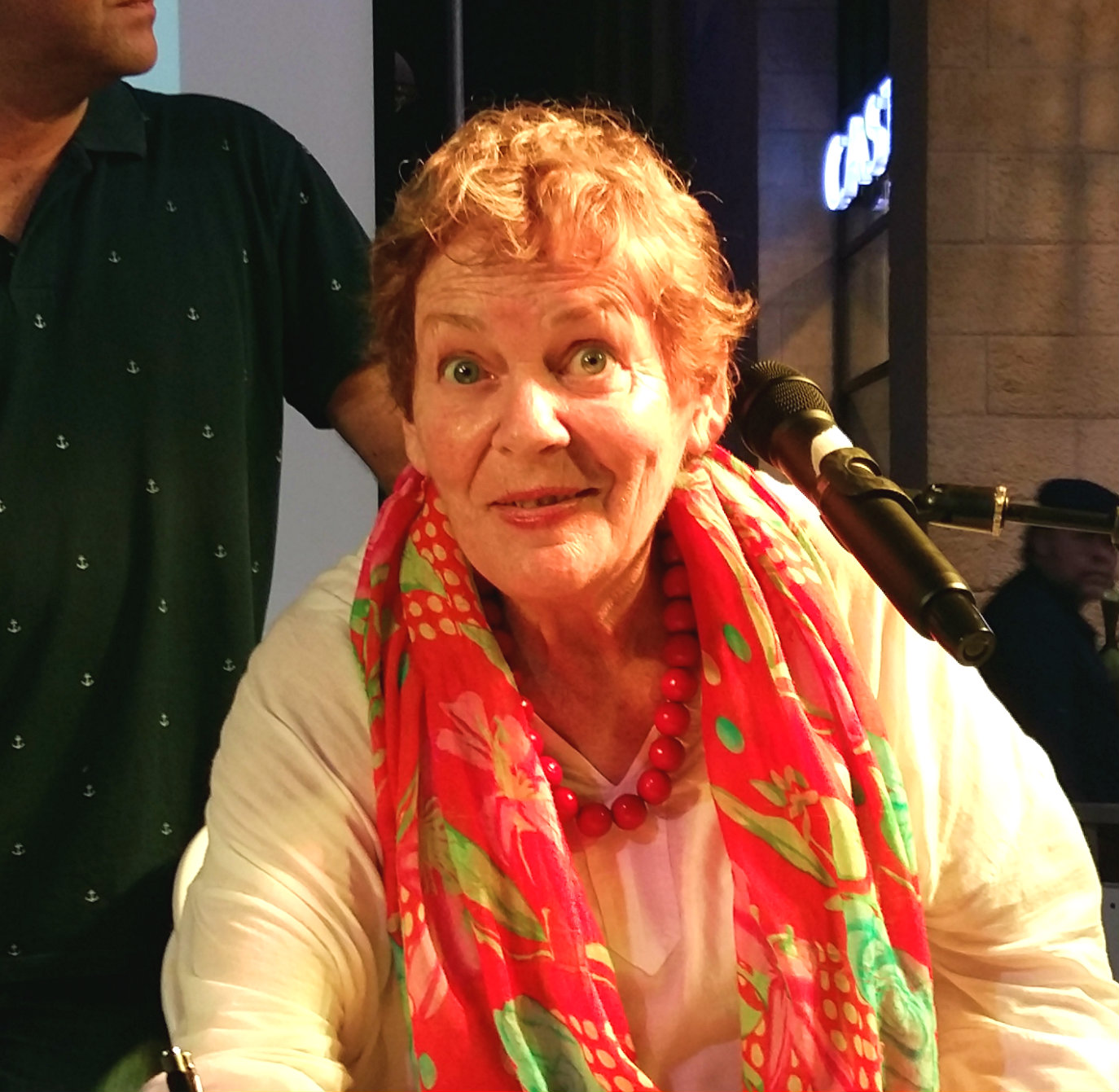
- Sara Sharon, August 2019
- Born: February 4, 1948 (age 77)
- Citizenship: Israel
- Years active: since 1978

Sarale "Sara" Sharon (Hebrew: שרה'לה "שרה" שרון; born February 4, 1948) is an Israeli singer, host of public singing television programs, and one of the most prominent figures in Israel in the field of Hebrew singing and in public singing.

== Biography ==
Sharon, born as Sarah Alter, grew up in Ashdot Ya'akov Ihud in a family of five children. She trained as a music teacher and taught music in kibbutzim and in nearby schools until retiring at age 50.

In 1978, she directed the Jordan Valley Singing Club, gaining recognition for popularizing Israeli songs on television. Her record with the club was a success.

In 1993, Sharon's band "Shiru" won Israel's "Kdam Eurovision" contest with the song Lehakat Shiru. the song represented Israel in Eurovision Song Contest 1993. Over the years, she made guest appearances on TV shows and participated in various projects.

In 2022, she appeared as a judge on "Eretz Nehederet". Sharon mentioned in a 2022 Haaretz interview, that she had secret missions in the Soviet Union during the 1980s.

== Personal life ==
Sharon was married to Yankela until his death in 2023, and has four children.
