= Mocedades =

Spanish singing group from the Basque Autonomous Community

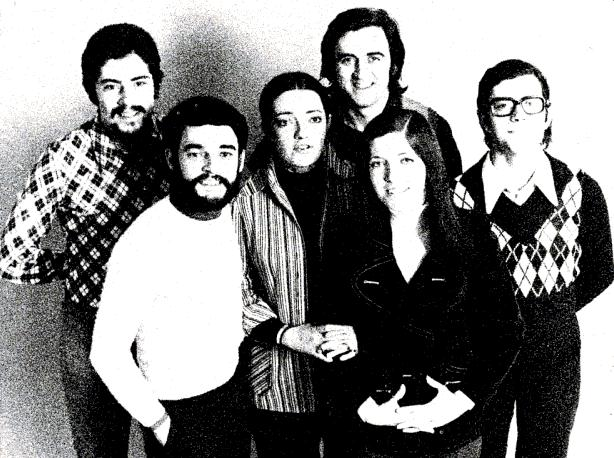
- The Group with the original members, "the six historics" in 1973

Background information
- Origin: Bilbao, Basque Country, Spain
- Genres: Folk; pop; canción melódica
- Years active: 1969–present
- Labels: Zafiro; CBS; Sony; DiscMedi; Walt Disney; Klasico
- Members: Formation A: Izaskun Uranga; Rosa Rodríguez; José María Santamaría; José Miguel González; Idoia Uranga; Toni Menguiano; Formation B: Javier Garay; Luis Hornedo; Aitor Melgosa; Icíar Ibarrondo; Belén Esteve
- Past members: Amaya Uranga; Roberto Uranga; José Ipiña; Estíbaliz Uranga; Sergio Blanco; Rafael Blanco; Francisco Panera; Carlos Zubiaga; Ana Bejerano; Iñaki Uranga; Inés Rangil; Íñigo Zubizarreta; José García; Arsenio Gutiérrez; Fernando González; José Antonio Las Heras; Idoia Arteaga; Iratxe Martínez de Arenaza; Begoña Costa; José María Cortés; Nando González
- Website: www.mocedades.com

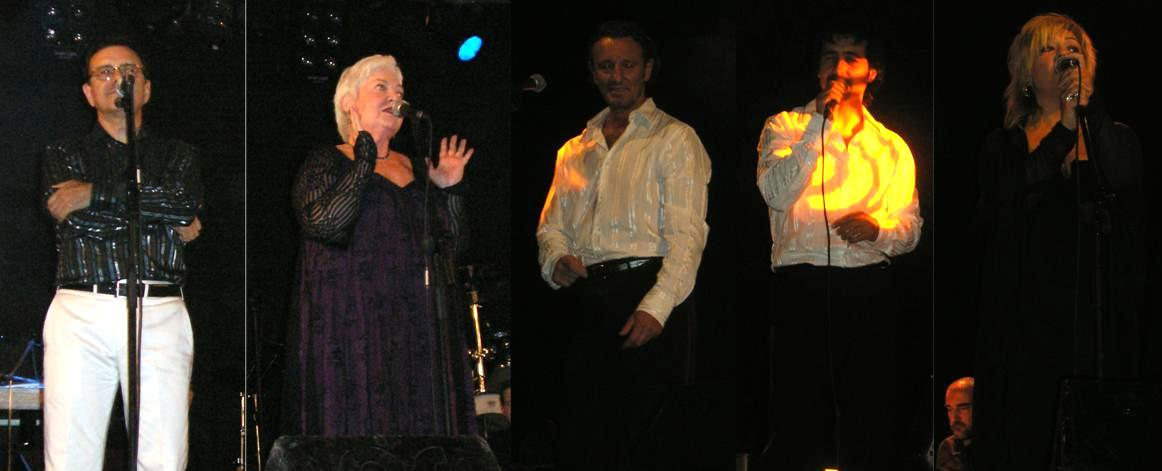
Mocedades (2006)

Mocedades (Spanish pronunciation: [moθeˈðaðes]) is a Spanish singing group from the Basque Country, who represented Spain in the Eurovision Song Contest in 1973 with the hit song "Eres tú". Since June 2014, Mocedades has been the name of two bands: one with Izaskun Uranga as its leader and the other with Javier Garay. A third group, El Consorcio, is composed of former Mocedades members who left the group but have continued a career together outside the Mocedades brand.

== History ==
=== Las Hermanas Uranga and Voces y Guitarras (1967–1969) ===
In 1967, in the Basque city of Bilbao, three young sisters, Amaya, Izaskun and Estíbaliz Uranga, formed a vocal trio named Las Hermanas Uranga. They sang at various venues in Bilbao. During their rehearsals, their brothers and friends joined. Eventually they decided to form a vocal group named Voces y Guitarras singing folk and spiritual music, with also music from The Beatles as their influences. The members of Voces y Guitarras were Amaya Uranga, Izaskun Uranga, Estibaliz Uranga, Roberto Uranga, Rafael Blanco, Sergio Blanco, José Ipiña, Javier Garay and Francisco "Paco" Panera. They spent a year performing around their hometown before sending a demo cassette to producer Juan Carlos Calderón in Madrid. He took an immediate interest in the group and renamed them Mocedades, meaning youths (from the Spanish word mocedad). Just before the group began to record their first album, Javier Garay could not join them because he needed to do military service, so Mocedades started out as an eight-member group.

=== Initial success (1969–1972) ===
In 1969, Mocedades signed a recording contract with Zafiro Records, and released their self-titled debut studio album that year, which was produced by Juan Carlos Calderón, who co-wrote most of the songs, including their debut single "Aridos campos", and their first hit song "Pange lingua". This was followed by their second studio album Mocedades 2, once again produced by Calderón, released in 1970 and featuring the hit song "Más allá", as well as Amaya Uranga's rendition of The Beatles' classic "Let It Be".

In 1971, before work on their third album began, José Ipiña and Francisco "Paco" Panera left the group to do military service (Panera never returned to the group in order to become a professor at a local university), and Javier Garay, once he completed his work in the Spanish army in Africa, rejoined the group that year. This led to the recording and release of their third studio album Mocedades 3, which was also produced by Calderón, and included the songs "Otoño", "My Bonnie" and "¡Oh No!"; the album eventually became the last one with Estíbaliz Uranga, Sergio Blanco and Rafael Blanco, before they departed Mocedades in 1972, during which by that time, they were realizing the show América Negra in theaters, with songs of spiritual nature, of which they had planned to make another album, but this project was truncated after the three aforementioned members left the group (eventually, Sergio and Estíbaliz would form a duo in 1973, releasing several albums and singles together –and even representing Spain at Eurovision in 1975–, and two decades later would be joining the vocal band El Consorcio).

=== Eurovision and worldwide success (1973–1984) ===
In 1973, José Ipiña returned to Mocedades, with a new member, Carlos Zubiaga (from Los Mitos) joining the group as well. It was with this line-up of six (Amaya, Izaskun, Roberto, Javier, José and Carlos), known in Spain as "The Six Historic Ones", that Mocedades achieved its greatest successes.

The group was now on its way to making a remarkable string of hits, starting with "Eres tú". With this song, they represented Spain at the 1973's Eurovision Song Contest and ended as the runner-up, earning 125 points, becoming the highest score Spain received to that point, later surpassed by Chanel's SloMo in 2022, 49 years later. However, "Eres tú" became an international hit. In the United States, "Eres tú" peaked at number nine on the Billboard Hot 100 chart, and reached the top-ten on the Billboard Adult Contemporary chart, becoming one of the few Spanish-language songs during that time to enter the top-ten in the US, selling over a million units in the country. "Eres tú" met with considerable success in Europe and Oceania as well, topping the charts in Spain; reaching the top-ten in Belgium, Norway, Iceland, Sweden, New Zealand and the Netherlands; and entering the top-twenty in Finland and Germany, as well as the top-thirty in Australia. The B-side of the single was the English-language version of the song ("Touch the Wind"), but radio stations preferred to play the original A-side version. The song was re-released in English as "Touch The Wind"; in German as "Das bist Du", in French as "C'est pour toi", in Italian as "Viva noi", and in Basque as "Zu Zara". "Eres tú" eventually became Mocedades' only hit in the US and Canada (where it reached number six), becoming a one-hit wonder in both countries, as its following single, "Dime Señor", failed to enter the Hot 100, though it was a minor hit on the Adult Contemporary chart.

The worldwide success of "Eres tú" was accompanied by the group's fourth studio album, Mocedades 4 (1973), once again produced by Juan Carlos Calderón (which was later named by them as the "seventh Mocedades"), which included another several hits such as "Adiós amor", performed by the group in Italian ("Addio amor") at the Sanremo Music Festival 1973, but they were eliminated. This was followed by Mocedades' fifth studio album, Mocedades 5 (1974), produced again by Calderón, and including several of its signature songs, such as "Tómame o déjame" and "El vendedor", earning more success in Spain and Latin America.

Mocedades continued the rest of the 1970s decade releasing several successful albums and singles through their record label Zafiro, with their long-time collaborator Calderón producing all of their material: La Otra España (1975, which includes the title track and "Charango"), El Color de tu Mirada (1976, which includes "Secretaria"), Mocedades 8 (1977, which includes "Sólo era un niño"), Kantaldia (1978, their first album entirely in Basque) and Mocedades 10 (1978, which includes "Quien te cantará"). After the release of their eleventh studio album Amor (1980, which includes "Me siento seguro"), Mocedades ended their recording contract with Zafiro, and parted ways with Calderón.

In 1980, Mocedades signed a new recording deal with CBS Records, and recorded more songs for the Spanish-speaking market to more international exposure. Their first album with CBS was their 12th studio album Desde que tú te has ido (1981), which included the album's title track and "Cuando te miro", earning considerable success in Latin America and Spain, with Oscar Gómez taking over the role of producer, replacing Juan Carlos Calderón (who eventually wrote a song for this album, "Andar, andar"). This was followed by their 13th studio album, Amor de hombre (1982), produced again by Gómez and earning major success, with several signature songs including the title track, "Donde estás corazón" and "Le llamaban loca"; eventually Isazkun Uranga became ill during the production of the album and became absent in several songs, being replaced by Idoia Uranga on some tracks (which previously replaced Isazkun when she gave birth to her first child in 1978) and was the lead vocalist on the track "Necesitando tu amor".

Mocedades' 14th studio album La Música (1983), was released, once again produced by Gómez, and continued the group's success with some hit songs such as "Maitechu mía" and "Has perdido tu tren". However, La Música became the group's final studio album to be released by "The Six Historic Ones", and the last one to feature Amaya Uranga. In 1984, they provided the soundtrack of the Spanish animated series La vuelta al mundo de Willy Fog. That same year, the group released their first live album 15 Años de Música, in which Juan Carlos Calderón conducts the orchestra during the first half of the concert, where they revisit the most popular songs from their time on Zafiro, and in the second half, Graham Priestley takes over as conductor for a performance of the most popular songs from their time with CBS; and for their earliest songs, the group were joined by Sergio and Estíbaliz, who returned to collaborate with their former bandmates. Following an extensive tour through Spain, Amaya Uranga announced that she would depart Mocedades, initially in order to rest and quit music business, but eventually returned a couple years later to pursue a solo career, which ended after she joined the vocal band El Consorcio, along with other former Mocedades bandmates.

=== Line-up changes, commercial decline and end of their "only" formation (1986–2014) ===
In 1985, Ana Bejerano was chosen as the new lead singer in Mocedades. Their first album with her was Colores (1986), their 15th studio album, released through CBS, produced once again by Oscar Gómez, and included the songs "Las palabras", "Ana y Miguel" and the title track, a Spanish version of Donovan's hit song "Colours", which featured him on the track. This was followed by their 16th studio album, Sobreviviremos (1987), this time produced by Geoff Westley, and included "Arió", "Quien más que yo" and the title track, but became their final album with José Ipiña and Carlos Zubiaga, before they left in 1989. During that time, the comparisons between Amaya and Ana in both studio albums and live performances were lethal for Mocedades' mainstream popularity, as both Colores and Sobreviviremos sold lower than their previous albums with Amaya. In 1990, Iñaki Uranga –one of the youngest brothers of the family– joined Mocedades and two years later, the group released their 17th studio album Íntimamente (1992), which recovered the musical style of their first years; however, this would become their last album with Ana Bejerano and Roberto Uranga, their only one with Iñaki, and their final one with Sony (which purchased CBS).

In 1993, Ana Bejerano and Iñaki Uranga left Mocedades (the latter one joined the vocal band El Consorcio later that year), and both were replaced by Ines Rangil and Iñigo Zubizarreta. Later, in 1994, Roberto Uranga left the group after 25 years, leaving Izaskun and Javier as the only "historic" members left. Roberto was replaced by José García, and with this new line-up (Izaskun, Javier, Ines, Iñigo and José), they recorded and released through DiscMedi (an independent Spanish record label), their 18th studio album Suave Luz in 1995, however, sales were poor and its promotion abruptly ended when Ines Rangil left the group in 1996 to embark on an unsuccessful solo career, being replaced by Idoia Arteaga, but several months later José and Iñigo departed as well to form a duo. In 1997, three new members joined Mocedades: José Antonio Las Heras, Arsenio Gutierrez and Fernando Gonzalez, and this new team worked again with Juan Carlos Calderón –for the first time since 1980– to make an album for Walt Disney Records, where they performed their own versions of Disney songs in Spanish, titled Mocedades canta a Walt Disney (1997), their 19th studio album, and the only one to feature Idoia, José Antonio and Arsenio. They started appearing on television again, but Izaskun had a car accident in 1999 which forced her to stay in bed for two years during which time the group stopped performing. Due to the lack of work, Idoia, Arsenio and Fernando left Mocedades, while José Antonio and Javier patiently waited for Izaskun's full recovery.

In 2001, Mocedades came back, and recruited Luis Hornedo and Iratxe Martinez, and started performing live concerts in Spain and Latin America with some success, while they promoted themselves on the Internet. They recorded several Beatles covers which were never released. 2005 proved to be an annus horribilis for Mocedades, since three members from different phases of the group died in a matter of months, Rafael Blanco (from their first era), Roberto Uranga (one of the "Six Historic Ones") and José Antonio Las Heras (who was still active in the group). He was replaced by a returning Fernando González. Iratxe left the group and the music business and was replaced by Rosa Rodríguez. Mocedades, with Izaskun Uranga, Javier Garay, Luis Hornedo, Rosa Rodríguez and Fernando González recorded which would become their 20th and final studio album, Mocedades canta a Juan Luis Guerra, with covers of songs from Dominican singer Juan Luis Guerra. This album was only released in Latin America and remains the only Mocedades album unreleased in Spain.

In 2010, Fernando took a temporary leave and was replaced by Edorta Aiartzagüena for their successful tour through the US. Fernando came back after their return to Spain in 2011. In June 2012, Javier Garay announced an impending new album. The first two songs, "Fue mentira" and "El diluvio universal", are available on iTunes. Work on the album was halted, however, due to the sudden departure of Rosa Rodríguez and Fernando Gonzalez from the group at early 2013. In April 2013, new members Begoña Costa and Aitor Melgosa joined Mocedades, who participated in the group's 45th anniversary tour of Mexico.

In May 2014, during a successful tour in Mexico, a schism occurred between the two remaining "historic" members of the group: Isazkun Uranga and Javier Garay. Izaskun wanted to readmit members who had left in 2013, such as Rosa Rodríguez and Fernando Gonzalez, but Javier refused, as it would represent the departure of the members who had joined in their place and because he "could not overlook what happened at the beginning of 2013". This led Izaskun to decide to separate from Javier and the rest of the members and, under the name Mocedades, she continued with the group on her own. According to the Spanish Patent and Trademark Office, the name Mocedades is registered by "The Six Historic Ones": Izaskun, Javier, Amaya, Roberto, José, and Carlos, meaning that the five who are still alive (Roberto died in 2005) have the name registered. This means that both Izaskun and Javier have the right to use the name Mocedades, and therefore the two formations that emerged in 2014 have the same legal standing.

=== Mocedades in two separate formations (2014–present) ===
==== Formation of Isazkun Uranga ====
Izaskun formed her own group as Mocedades, reuniting with Rosa Rodríguez (a member of the original lineup from 2005 to 2013) and Fernándo González (also a member of the original lineup from 1996 to 1999 and again from 2005 to 2013). They were joined by Arsenio Gutiérrez (another original member from 1996 to 1999); and a new member, José María Santamaría. This new lineup debuted in June 2014, performing in a series of concerts throughout Spain. At the end of the summer, Arsenio Gutiérrez left the group and was replaced by José María Cortés, who remained on the lineup until 2015, where he was replaced by the group's manager José Miguel González.

The lineup with Isazkun, Rosa, Fernando, José María and José Miguel, remained for almost six years, in which during that time they released: the studio albums Por Amor a México (2018) and Por Amor a México, Vol. 2 (2019); as well as their second live album Sinfónico (2019). In January 2021, Fernando González definitely left the group, and was replaced by Nando González. Additionally, Idoia Uranga officially joined Mocedades as a main member (after being temporarily in the group to replace Isazkun during live performances in 1978, and again during several recording sessions of Amor de hombre in 1982). Nando remained only for seven months until September of 2021, when he left the group and was replaced by Toni Menguiano.

Since September 2021, the formation of Isazkun, with Rosa, José María, José Miguel, Idoia and Toni, remained to this day. This lineup released another successful album, Infinito Duets (2022), which includes new versions of their greatest hits in duets with Gloria Trevi, Emmanuel, Arthur Hanlon, Morat, Il Divo, David Bisbal, Ana Torroja, Rio Roma, Lucero, Fonseca, and many others. This was followed by the release of several singles, such as a new version of "Eres tú" (2023) with Plácido Domingo, "Gracias a la vida" (2023) with Myriam Hernández, "Peregrina" (2024), their own version of "La Bikina" (2024), "Tu ejemplo" (2025), "Hoy" (2025) with Gian Marco, and "Si tú me dices ven" (2025) with Rafael Basurto.

==== Formation of Javier Garay ====
Meanwhile, the members of Mocedades who remained with Javier Garay, from the final original lineup (Luis Hornedo, Begoña Costa and Aitor Meltosa), continued with a new vocalist, Iciar Ibarrondo, and in 2014, they recorded their first album Andar, Amar..., released in April 2015, which includes new versions of Mocedades' greatest hits. Their first single, a new re-recording of "Quien te cantará" was released on their website. They have also performed numerous concerts throughout Spain and Latin America. This lineup continued until November of 2018, when Begoña Costa left the group, and was replaced by Ana Bejerano, an original member from 1985 to 1993, which originally replaced Amaya Uranga as the new lead vocalist of Mocedades, returning after an absence of 25 years. They released a new song: "Que no se acabe el mundo", written by their long-time collaborator Oscar Gómez –producer of several Mocedades albums on CBS–. Ana Bejerano died on 2 January 2022, and a new vocalist joined the group, Belén Esteve. They released the song "A pesar de todo... feliz navidad" in 2024.

== Members ==
=== Original lineup (1969–2014) ===
- Amaya Uranga (1969–1984)
- Izaskun Uranga (1969–2014)
- Estibaliz Uranga (1969–1972)
- Roberto Uranga (1969–1994)
- Sergio Blanco (1969–1972)
- Rafael Blanco (1969–1972)
- Javier Garay (1971–2014)
- José Ipiña (1969–1970, 1973–1989)
- Francisco Pañera (1969–1970)
- Carlos Zubiaga (1973–1989)
- Ana Bejerano (1985–1993)
- Iñaki Uranga (1990–1993)
- Ines Rangil (1993–1996)
- Iñigo Zubizarreta (1993–1996)
- José García (1994–1996)
- Idoia Arteaga (1996–1999)
- Arsenio Gutiérrez (1996–1999)
- José Antonio Las Heras (1996–2005)
- Fernando González (1996–1999, 2005–2013)
- Iratxe Martínez (2001–2005)
- Luis Hornedo (2001–2014)
- Rosa Rodríguez (2005–2013)
- Edorta Aiartzagüena (2010–2011)
- Begoña Costa (2013–2014)
- Aitor Melgosa (2013–2014)

=== Separate lineups (2014–present) ===
==== Isazkun Uranga ====
- Rosa Rodríguez (2014–present)
- José María Santamaría (2014–present)
- Fernando González (2014–2021)
- José María Cortés (2014–2015)
- Arsenio Gutiérrez (2014)
- José Miguel González (2015–present)
- Idoia Uranga (2021–present)
- Toni Menguiano (2021–present)
- Nando González (2021)

==== Javier Garay ====
- Luis Hornedo (2014–present)
- Aitor Melgosa (2014–present)
- Icíar Ibarrondo (2014–present)
- Begoña Costa (2014–2018)
- Ana Bejerano (2018–2022)
- Belén Esteve (2022–present)

== "Eres tú" covers ==
A well known cover version of "Eres Tú" was recorded by Perry Como on 29 April 1974.

A guitar instrumental version of "Eres Tú" was used in a Bank of New Zealand TV advertising campaign in the 1990s.

In the movie Tommy Boy, there's a scene in which Chris Farley and David Spade sing the original Spanish version of "Eres Tú".

== Discography ==
=== Albums ===
- 1969 Mocedades 1
- 1970 Mocedades 2
- 1971 Mocedades 3
- 1973 Mocedades 4
- 1974 Mocedades 5
- 1975 La otra España
- 1976 El Color de tu Mirada
- 1977 Mocedades 8
- 1978 Kantaldia
- 1978 Mocedades 10
- 1980 Amor
- 1981 Desde que tú te has ido
- 1982 Amor de hombre
- 1983 La musica
- 1984 15 años de música
- 1984 La vuelta al mundo de Willy Fog
- 1986 Colores
- 1987 Sobreviviremos
- 1992 Intimamente
- 1995 Suave luz
- 1997 Mocedades canta a Walt Disney
- 2007 Mocedades canta a Juan Luis Guerra

Release dates in Spain are shown except the 2007 album which was only released in America.

=== Compilation albums ===
- Recuerdos de Mocedades
- Lo mejor de Mocedades
- Especial de: Mocedades
- Especial de: Mocedades 2
- Mocedades 11/12
- Mocedades
- Mocedades 2
- Mocedades en Euzkera
- Todo Mocedades
- Mocedades 3
- Álbum de oro
- 15 éxitos 15—Mocedades
- 14 éxitos de Mocedades
- 12 grandes éxitos
- Lo mejor de Mocedades 2
- 20 de colección
- Antología—Sus 30 grandes canciones
- Antología 2
- Queridos Mocedades
- Internacional
- Serie Brillantes—Mocedades
- Lo mejor de Mocedades 3
- Serie Platino—20 Éxitos—Mocedades
- Personalidad
- Personalidad Vol. II
- Grandes Éxitos
- Más allá + Mocedades 8
- Lo mejor de Mocedades 4
- Ayer y hoy
- Ídolos de siempre
- Colección la vida por delante
- Latin Stars – Mocedades – 15 Éxitos
- Colección original
- Recuerdos
- 30 aniversario
- Tómame o déjame
- La otra España
- Maitechu mía
- Las cosas sencillas
- 40 grandes éxitos
- Mocedades – RCA Club
- Éxitos de Mocedades
- 22 Ultimate Latin hits 2002

=== Singles ===
Year	Single	Chart positions			
Year	Single	US	US AC	AU	CA
1974	"Eres Tu (Touch The Wind)"	9	8	30	6
1974	"Dime Senor"	–	48	-	-

== Songs not included in the original albums ==
- 1969 Navidad Feliz (Happy Christmas) (never released on vinyl or on CD but sung on the Spanish TV network TVE with Marisol)
- 1970 Viejo Marino (side B of a special edition single (45 rpm) of the Latin religious song Pange Lingua)
- 1970 Un mundo mejor (not released, sung on the Spanish TV network TVE. Mocedades and Voces Amigas both sang this song in the competition to choose a group to represent Spain in Eurovision.)
- 1973 Gitano (originally not released, included in the re-mastering of Mocedades 5 and on Eres tú, los grandes éxitos. Mocedades chose Eres tu over this song to compete in Eurovision.)
- 1973 4 covers of the song Eres tu done in German: Das Bist Du, French: C'est pour toi, English: Touch the Wind and Italian: Viva noi. The same melody and orchestration was used for each cover but the translations of the lyrics were quite different from the original Eres tu.
- 1981 El Niño Robot (The Robot Kid) (included in the album Cosas de niños in which several Spanish groups sing children's songs)
- 1981 Los Cochinitos Dormilones (The 3 Little Sleepy Pigs) (included in the album Cosas de niños)
- 1981 Desde que tú te has ido was released in Brazil and Portugal with 2 songs re-done in Portuguese. The title song Desde que tu te has ido was redone as Despedida (Se voce for embora) and Peter Skellern's You're a Lady was redone as Reencontro. Both Portuguese versions can now be heard on YouTube.
- 1983 Amor primero (duet with Patxi Andión on one of his albums)
- 1983 Lo creas o no (cover of the American hit song: Believe It or Not the theme song of the American TV program The Greatest American Hero) (never included in any of the albums by Mocedades but appears on side B of the single Maitechu mía, with Plácido Domingo; it is also included in Antología 2)
- 1985 Lluvia de plata (a duet with Sergio y Estibaliz on their album Cuidado con la noche which was recorded after Amaya Uranga left the group but before Ana Bejerano joined the group.)
- 1986 Ay, amor (a duet with Jose Luis Perales on one of his albums.)
- 1992 Las 1001 Américas (included on a 45 rpm single with the two theme songs from the cartoon series Las 1001 Americas)
- 1992 Volando en tu imaginación (included on a 45 rpm single with the two theme songs from the cartoon series Las 1001 Americas)
- 1997 Mi tierra (a duet with Nino Bravo in his second greatest hits album. Although Nino Bravo had died in 1973, two sets of Greatest Hits albums were produced with some songs artificially made into duets with modern Spanish singers.)
- 1997 Dicen (a duet with Nino Bravo in his second greatest hits album. Other singers in this song included Eva Ferri, Sandra Morey, Ma Conchita Alonso, Marcos Llunas, Jacobo Calderon (son of album producer Juan Carlos Calderon,) Michelle and Maria Caneda.)
- ???? Vieja ciudad (never released on its own but finally included in Antología 2)
- ???? Tiempo de vals (never released on its own but finally included in Antología 2)

== Covers of "Eres tú" ==
- 101 Strings – Eres tu
- Acker Bilk – Eres tu
- Al estilo de Mocedades – Eres tu
- Alvaro Clemente – Eres tu
- Amaya Uranga/Juan Carlos Calderon – Eres tu
- Anacani – Eres tu
- Andrés Calamaro – Eres tu
- Annemieke & Jan Rot – Dicht Bij Jou (Dutch)
- Atalaje – Eres tu
- Austin Kley & Mantovani – Eres tu
- Bedevilers – Eres tu (punk rock)
- Bert Kaempfert – Touch The Wind (English)
- Bertín Osborne – Eres tu
- Bing Crosby – Eres tu
- Bo Derek – Eres tu
- Bres Bezed – Eres tu
- Bullerfnis – Rør Ved Mig (Danish)
- Byron Lee and the Dragonaries – Eres tu
- Calito Soul – Eres tu
- Cerveza Mahou – Eres tu
- Daniela Castillo – Eres tu
- Dansk top – Rør Ved Mig (Danish)
- David and the High Spirits – Eres tu
- Eydie Gorme – Eres tu
- El Chaval De La Peca – Eres tu
- El Consorcio – Eres tu
- El Frenillo de Gaugin – Eres tu (Punk Rock)
- El ser y ser – Eres tu (Rap)
- Estela Raval – Eres tu (from Argentina)
- Floyd Cramer – Touch The Wind (English)
- Gé Korsten – Touch The Wind (English)
- Gebroeder Brouwer – Eres tu (Trumpet instrumental)
- GrupoSarao – Eres tu
- Hella Joof & Peter Frödin – Rør Ved Mig (Danish)
- Howard Morrison Chor – Eres tu
- III of a Kind Philippines – Eres tu
- Ilanit – Eres tu
- Inger Lise Rypdal – I Mitt Liv (Norwegian)
- Inger Öst – Rör vid mig (Swedish)
- Instrumental – Eres tu
- Jimmy Mitchell – Eres tu (Spanish with American accent)
- Johanna of La Academia 4ta Generación – Eres tu
- Johnny Mathis and Juan Carlos Calderon – Touch the Wind (English with Spanish chorus)
- Johnny Reimar – Rør Ved Mig (Danish)
- Johnny Rodriguez – Eres tu
- José Augusto – Eres tu
- José Calvário – Eres Tu (orchestral version)
- Juan Carlos Calderón – Eres tu (Composer version)
- Justo Lamas – Eres tu
- Karaoke – Eres tu
- Karel Gott, Spravny Ton – Eres tu (Czech)
- Kathy Kelly – Eres tu
- Katri Helena – Runoni Kaunein Olla Voit (Finnish)
- Katri Helena – Sinä Vain (Finnish)
- Kelly Family – Eres tu
- Khanh Ha – Co Gai Rung Mo (Vietnamese)
- Korean Choir – Eres tu
- La Decada Prodigiosa – Eres tu
- Lady lu – Eres tu
- Landscape – Touch The Wind (English)
- Lecia & Lucienne – Lecia & Lucienne – Rør Ved Mig (Danish)
- Lettermen – Eres tu
- Liceo Panamericano – Eres tu
- Little Angels Of Korea – Eres tu
- Lola Ponce – Eres tu
- Luis Chacon – Eres tu
- Luis Miguel – Eres tu
- Lupita D'Alessio – Eres tu
- Mantovani Orchestra – Eres tu
- Mariachi Vargas – Eres tu
- Mona – I mitt liv (Norwegian)
- Pan Flute – Eres tu (Pan Flute)
- PANDORA – Eres tu
- Parrita – Eres tu
- Patricia Y Los Stars – Eres tu
- Patti Donelli @ USC-Pgh – Touch the Wind (English)
- Percy Faith – Touch the Wind (English)
- Perry Como – Eres tu
- Perpetuum Jazzile – Brez besed/Eres tu (ironic medley of Eres tu with the song Calderon was accused of copying)
- Perry Como – That's You (English)
- Petula Clark – Will My Love Be You (English)
- Pistas – Eres tu (Panflute)
- Ray Conniff – Eres tu
- Reggae Chico Man – Eres tu
- Regina Orozco – Eres tu
- Rika Zarai – C'est pour toi (French)
- Rina Hugo – Jy's vir my (Afrikaans)
- Roberto Delgado – Eres tu (Instrumental)
- Rob's Band – Eres tu
- Rodrigo e Rogério – É você (Brazilian Portuguese)
- Romantica de Xalapa – Eres tu
- Sandy Caldera – Eres tu
- Shegundo Galarza e a Sua Grande Orquestra – Eres Tu (orchestral version)
- Sonny James – Eres tu
- Soul Sanet – Eres tu
- Spaanse Schaep Cast – Er is toe (Dutch)
- Stef Meeder – Tweedle dee, Eres tu medley instr
- Supremas de Mostoles – Eres tu
- Sweethearts – Rør Ved Mig (Danish)
- TBC – Rør Ved Mig (Danish Rap)
- Tish Hinojosa – Eres tu
- Unknown, tenor – Du Bist Wie Die Sonne (German)
- volkana – Eurovision medley including Eres tu
- Wheeler St James – Touch the wind (English)
- Willeke Alberti – Waar naartoe (Dutch)
- Zereno – Eres tu

== See also ==
Related acts:

- El Consorcio
- Sergio y Estíbaliz
- Trigo Limpio
- Txarango

Preceded by Jaime Morey with "Amanece"	Spain in the Eurovision Song Contest; 1973	Succeeded by Peret with "Canta y sé feliz"
