= Iceland in the Eurovision Song Contest 1993 =

- Eurovision Song Contest 1993
- Participating broadcaster: Ríkisútvarpið (RÚV)
- Country: Iceland
- Selection process: Söngvakeppni Sjónvarpsins 1993
- Selection date: 20 February 1993

Competing entry
- Song: "Þá veistu svarið"
- Artist: Inga
- Songwriters: Jon Kjell Seljeseth; Friðrik Sturluson

Placement
- Final result: 13th, 42 points

Participation chronology

Iceland was represented at the Eurovision Song Contest 1993 with the song "Þá veistu svarið", composed by Jon Kjell Seljeseth, with lyrics by Friðrik Sturluson, and performed by Inga. The Icelandic participating broadcaster, Ríkisútvarpið (RÚV), selected its entry through Söngvakeppni Sjónvarpsins 1993.

== Before Eurovision ==
=== Söngvakeppni Sjónvarpsins 1993 ===
Ríkisútvarpið (RÚV) held the national final on 20 February 1993 at its studios in Reykjavík, hosted by Steinn Ármann Magnússon. 10 songs competed, with the winner being selected by the votes of nine juries – eight regional juries and a final professional jury.

The winner was "Þá veistu svarið" performed by Ingibjörg Stefánsdóttir. The song was composed by Jon Kjell Seljeseth, with lyrics by Friðrik Sturluson.

Final – 20 February 1993
R/O	Artist	Song	Points	Place
1	Ingunn Gylfadóttir	"Brenndar brýr"	62	3
2	Anna Mjöll Ólafsdóttir	"Eins og skot"	70	2
3	Haukur Hauksson	"Í roki og regni"	43	6
4	Margrét Eir	"Ó hve ljúft er að lifa"	46	5
5	Eró-bikkjan	"Hopp-abla-ha"	39	7
6	Katla Maria Hausmann	"Samba"	32	9
7	Ingibjörg Stefánsdóttir	"Þá veistu svarið"	86	1
8	Ingunn Gylfadóttir	"Ég bý hér enn"	34	8
9	Guðlaug Dröfn Ólafsdóttir	"Bless bless"	48	4
10	Július Guðmundsson	"Himinn, jörð og haf"	20	10

Detailed Jury Votes
R/O	Song	West	Westfjords	Northwest	Northeast	East	South	Reykjanes	Reykjavík	Professionals	Total
1	"Brenndar brýr"	10	10	6	10	7	3	8	8		62
2	"Eins og skot"	5	5	12	7	2	5	6	12	16	70
3	"Í roki og regni"	2	1	7	6	10	1	12	4		43
4	"Ó hve ljúft er að lifa"	8	8	5	3	6	8	7	1		46
5	"Hopp-abla-ha"	4	7	4	2	8	6	5	3		39
6	"Samba"	7	4	3	1	3	7	1	6		32
7	"Þá veistu svarið"	12	12	8	12	12	10	10	10		86
8	"Ég bý hér enn"	6	2	2	4	5	4	4	7		34
9	"Bless bless"	3	3	10	8	4	12	3	5		48
10	"Himinn, jörð og haf"	1	6	1	5	1	2	2	2		20

== At Eurovision ==
Ingibjörg, now as Inga, performed 9th on the night of the contest, held in Millstreet, Ireland, following Malta and preceding Austria. Inga received 42 points for her performance of "Þá veistu svarið", placing 13th of 25 competing countries.

=== Voting ===
Points awarded to Iceland
Score	Country
12 points	
10 points	
8 points	
7 points	Netherlands; Sweden
6 points	
5 points	Croatia; Slovenia
4 points	Denmark; Greece
3 points	
2 points	Cyprus; Israel; Norway; United Kingdom
1 point	Austria; Ireland

Points awarded by Iceland
Score	Country
12 points	United Kingdom
10 points	Norway
8 points	France
7 points	Sweden
6 points	Netherlands
5 points	Finland
4 points	Switzerland
3 points	Ireland
2 points	Portugal
1 point	Turkey
