= María Uriz =

Spanish soprano

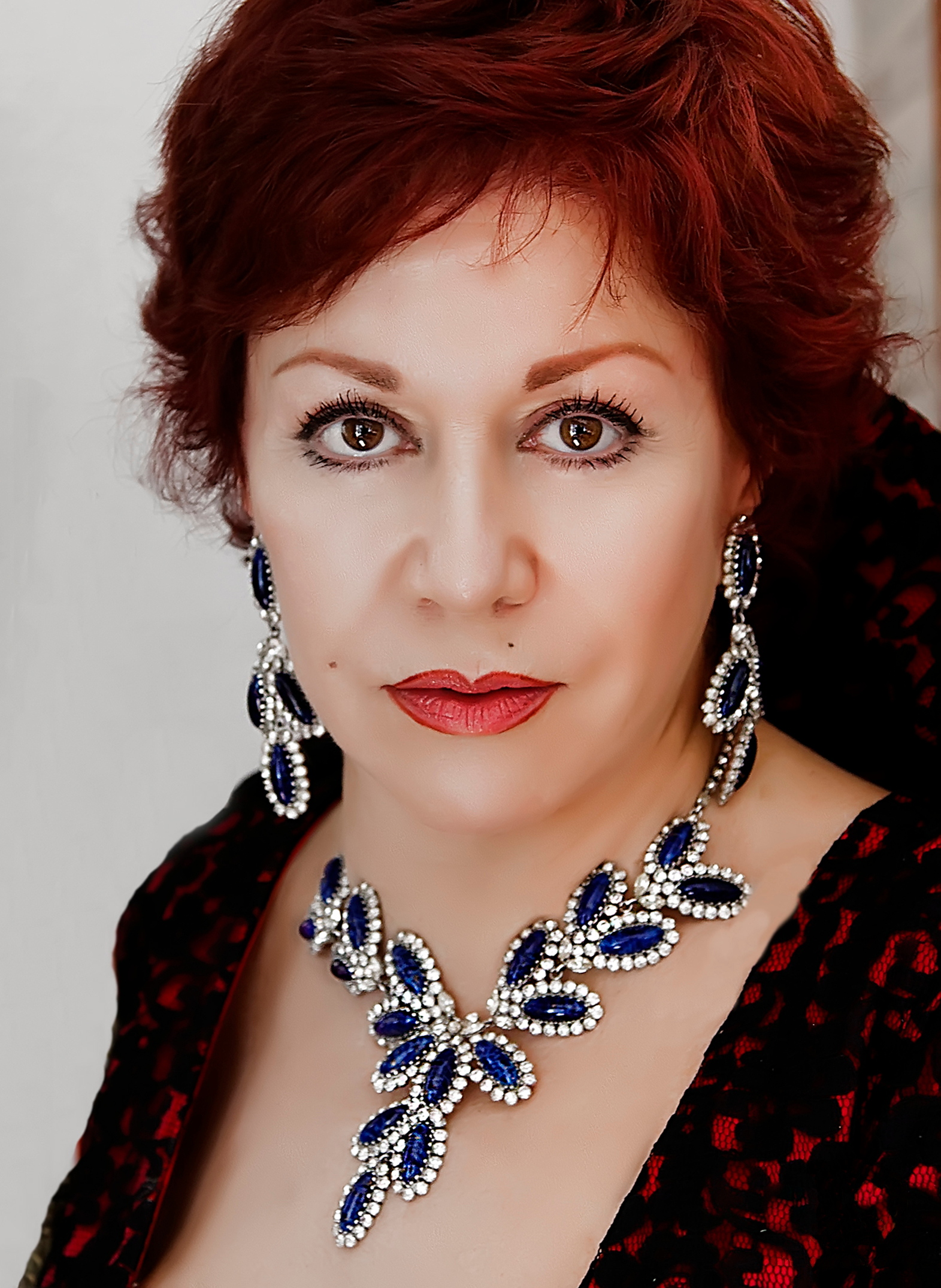
- Born: María de la Asunción Uriz Mosquera; 21 August 1946 (age 80); A Coruña, Spain
- Education: Conservatori Superior de Música del Liceu
- Occupation: Soprano singer Musical career
- Genres: Opera
- Spouse: Klaus Dolle

María de la Asunción Uriz Mosquera (born 21 August 1946), better known as María Uriz, is a Spanish soprano.

== Biography ==
María Uriz was born in A Coruña. While studying for her Superior Baccalaureate, she began studying piano, chamber music, and dramatic art at the Conservatory of Music in her hometown. At the end of these courses, and influenced by her brother who was a member of the Echo Polyphonic Choir, she took her first steps in the world of opera. After that, she began her singing career, concluding her studies at the Conservatori Superior de Música del Liceu.

In the 1970s she obtained the March and Castellblanch scholarships, which allowed her to move to Italy to further her studies. Later she also obtained the Agustín Pedro y Pons scholarship and the Eugenia Kémeny singing prize. Shortly after this, she was required by the authorities to act in the reception that annually recognized the then head of state Francisco Franco and his ministers at the Municipal Palace of A Coruña. For four years, and under the direction of famous soprano Elvira de Hidalgo, the teacher of Maria Callas, she studied vocal and stage technique in Milan.

Since her debut in 1974, Uriz has become a regular singer at the Gran Teatre del Liceu in Barcelona with a wide repertoire. She participated in special performances of Doña Francisquita directed by Plácido Domingo; La bohème with Plácido Domingo and Montserrat Caballé, with Jeanette Pilou and Beniamino Prior, La favorite with Alfredo Kraus, Maruxa, Medea, and Roméo et Juliette. She has also performed in zarzuelas and operas at the Teatro de la Zarzuela in Madrid, recitals at the Palau de la Música Catalana, Teatro Colón, and Rosalía de Castro in A Coruña, and in cities such as Oviedo, Gijón, Ourense, Vigo, Santiago de Compostela, Düsseldorf, and Luxembourg.

== Television appearances ==
Uriz has recorded several TVE specials on opera, such as La saga de los Rius, playing Amelia in Un ballo in maschera (José Carreras) and Leonora in Il trovatore (with J. Aragall).

== Awards ==
- 1977 RNE gold medal – Gran Teatre del Liceu, given to the youngest singer in the operatic season
- Galician Disc Award (CBS-Columbia) on Galician Literature Day for Cantigas galegas dos seculos XIX e XX (1978)
- Great Cross of Humanitarian Merit (2006)

== Selected repertoire ==
- 1974 Sigfried, Arabella, Hänsel und Gretel
- 1975–76 Carmen (with Plácido Domingo), Norma, The Marriage of Figaro, Don Gil, La traviata (with Jaume Aragall), Macbeth (with Pedro la Virgen, Joan Pons)
- 1976–77 La bohème (with Plácido Domingo and Montserrat Caballe), Romeo, Medea (with Montserrat Caballe), La traviata
- 1977–78 Parisina d'Este (with Montserrat Caballe and Plácido Domingo), La bohème (with Montserrat Caballe)
- 1978–79 Maruxa, La vida breve
- 1980 Il trovatore, Elisabetta, regina d'Inghilterra
- 1981 Adriana (with Plácido Domingo, Montserrat Caballe, José Carreras, Mirella Freni)
- 1982 La chulapona, La marchenera (anthology of Moreno Torroba), La favorite (with Alfredo Kraus)
- 1983 El asombro de Damasco, La del Soto del Parral, Luisa Fernanda, Los gavilanes, La fanciulla del West (with Plácido Domingo), Macbeth, La traviata
- 1984 Il turco in Italia (with Sesto Bruscantini), Curro Vargas, La verbena
- 1985 Doña Francisquita, Macbeth
- 1986 Manon, La traviata (with Alfredo Kraus)
- 1987 Cavalleria rusticana (with Plácido Domingo, Elena Obratsova), Gianni Schicchi (with Rolando Panerai), Saffo (with Monteserrat Caballe), Adriana, Mefistofele (with Monteserrat Caballe)
- 1989 Manon Lescaut (with Mirella Freni, Renata Scotto), Adriana (with Mirella Freni, Monteserrat Caballe, José Carreras, Plácido Domingo), Tancredi (with Marilyn Horne)
- 1990 Elektra, Die Walküre (with Simon Estes), Aida, La fiamma (with Monteserrat Caballe), Suor Angelica
- 1991 La traviata
- 1992 Maria Stuarda (with Daniela Dessi), La traviata
- 1993 Carmen, Il trovatore
- 1994 La verbena, La del Soto del Parral, Sueños de Gloria
- 1996 Macbeth
- 1998 Jenůfa
- 2001 Pan y toros
