= José Antonio de la Hoz Uranga =

Spanish footballer

Personal information
- Full name: José Antonio de la Hoz Uranga
- Date of birth: 8 January 1949 (age 77)
- Place of birth: Getaria, Spain
- Height: 1.71 m (5 ft 7 in)
- Position: Left back

Youth career
- Real Sociedad

Senior career*
Years	Team	Apps	(Gls)
1970–1972	San Sebastián		
1972–1978	Real Sociedad	76	(0)
1978–1979	Lagun Onak	27	(0)
- * Club domestic league appearances and goals

José Antonio de la Hoz Uranga (born 8 January 1949) is a Spanish footballer who played as a left back.

== Playing career ==
Uranga began his senior career at San Sebastián, Real Sociedad's B team, in 1970 after progressing from the youth teams. On 7 October 1972, Uranga made his debut for Sociedad, coming on as a 76th minute substitute in a 1–0 win against UD Las Palmas. In total, Uranga made 101 appearances in Sociedad's first team over the course of six years. Following his time at Sociedad, Uranga signed for Lagun Onak.

== Basque nationalism ==
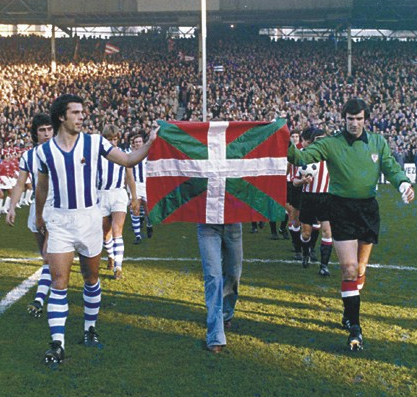
The Ikurriña introduced by Uranga and sewed by his sister, Ane Miren.

Uranga was a Basque nationalist. Prior to a Basque derby tie against Athletic Bilbao on 5 December 1976, Uranga formed a plan for both teams to exit the tunnel onto the field of play with a Basque flag, the Ikurriña. Due to the policies of Francoist Spain, the flag was still banned, despite Francisco Franco's death a year earlier. In January 1977, the flag was legalised in Spain, with Bilbao goalkeeper José Ángel Iribar stating the display "really helped" with the legalisation of the flag.

Uranga was sentenced to eight years in prison after the kidnapping of Andrés Gutiérrez Blanco in 1987 by ETA, an armed Basque separatist group. Blanco was held hostage in Getxo for 47 days, until a ransom of 190 million ₧ was paid by his family. Despite his sentence, Uranga only served six months and was later pardoned by José Luis Rodríguez Zapatero's government in January 2009.
