= Local 9 =

Spanish hard rock band

- Origin: Spain Valencia - Madrid
- Genres: Hard rock and heavy metal
- Years active: 2006–present
- Members: David Tormo; JJ; David Marqués; José Luis Galán; Miki
- Website: Official website

LOCAL 9 is a Spanish hard rock band formed by drummer Julio JJ in July 2006. In February 2008, bass player David Marqués joined the band, in July 2011 José Luis Galán (rhythm guitar) joined the band, in November 2014 guitar player David Tormo and later in January 2015 vocalist Miki complete the current lineup.

In 2011 they recorded an EP and in 2013 recorded their first CD, which included a recording with Chinese voices of their songs Sólo puedo anidar en ti and Imposible.

In November 2013 they joined forces with José Andrëa, ex-lead singer of Spanish folk-rock band Mago de Oz, to record a new version of their song Sólo puedo anidar en ti in Chinese/Spanish.

== Members ==
- David Tormo - Lead guitar
- JJ - Drums
- David Marqués - Bass guitar
- José Luis Galán - Rhythm guitar
- Miki - voice

== Discography ==
=== Albums and EPs ===
- 2011 - Pacto de Diablos (EP)
- 2013 - LOCAL 9
- 2014 - Juntos pero Revueltos
