= Spain in the Eurovision Song Contest 1975 =

- Eurovision Song Contest 1975
- Participating broadcaster: Televisión Española (TVE)
- Country: Spain
- Selection process: Internal selection
- Announcement date: Artist: 15 January 1975

Competing entry
- Song: "Tú volverás"
- Artist: Sergio y Estíbaliz
- Songwriter: Juan Carlos Calderón

Placement
- Final result: 10th, 53 points

Participation chronology

Spain was represented at the Eurovision Song Contest 1975 with the song "Tú volverás", written by Juan Carlos Calderón, and performed by Sergio y Estíbaliz. The Spanish participating broadcaster, Televisión Española (TVE), internally selected its entry for the contest. The song, performed in position 17, placed tenth out of nineteen competing entries with 53 points.

== Before Eurovision ==
Televisión Española (TVE) internally selected "Tú volverás" performed by Sergio y Estíbaliz as its entry for the Eurovision Song Contest 1975. The song was written by Juan Carlos Calderón. The duo, formed by Sergio Blanco and Estíbaliz Uranga, were announced as the performers on 15 January 1975, and a song was chosen for them later. TVE selected "Tú volverás" from among the three songs Calderón presented and the duo recorded a demo of. They also recorded the song in English as "Love come home".

On 1 March 1975, Sergio y Estíbaliz guest performed "Tú volverás" in the variety show ¡Señoras y señores! on TVE 1. On 19 March 1975, TVE aired a special program dedicated to the duo on TVE 1, directed by Valerio Lazarov.

== At Eurovision ==
On 22 March 1975, the Eurovision Song Contest was held at Sankt Eriks-Mässan in Stockholm hosted by Sveriges Radio (SR), and broadcast live throughout the continent. Sergio y Estíbaliz performed "Tú volverás" 17th in the evening, following Portugal and preceding Sweden. Juan Carlos Calderón conducted the performance of the Spanish entry. At the close of voting "Tú volverás" had received 53 points, placing 10th in a field of 19.

TVE broadcast the contest in Spain on TVE 1 with commentary by José Luis Uribarri. Before the event, TVE aired a talk show hosted by José María Íñigo introducing the Spanish jury, which continued after the contest commenting on the results.

=== Voting ===
TVE assembled a jury panel with eleven members. The following members comprised the Spanish jury:

- Alfonso Lapeña Esquivel – Head of Broadcasting at TVE (chairperson)
- Carmen de la Maza – actress
- José Luis López Vázquez – actor
- Angel Díaz – doctor
- Piedad García de la Rasilla – director of Banco de la Mujer
- Ana Lázaro Rodriguez – choreographer
- Vicente López Pascual – student
- María Ángeles de los Reyes López – psychologist
- Esperanza Manzanares – nurse
- Fernando Cerrada – runner
- Gerardo Prieto – student

The secretary and spokesperson was José María Íñigo. The jury awarded its maximum of 12 points to the Netherlands.

Points awarded to Spain
Score	Country
12 points	
10 points	
8 points	Finland
7 points	Ireland
6 points	Italy
5 points	Germany; Switzerland
4 points	Belgium; Israel; Monaco; Yugoslavia
3 points	Norway; Turkey
2 points	
1 point	

Points awarded by Spain
Score	Country
12 points	Netherlands
10 points	United Kingdom
8 points	France
7 points	Italy
6 points	Luxembourg
5 points	Sweden
4 points	Germany
3 points	Ireland
2 points	Portugal
1 point	Finland
