= Maruxa =

Maruxa is a feminine given name. It is a diminutive of the name María. Notable people with the name include:

- Maruxa Orxales (d. 2010), Spanish poet
- Maruxa Pita (1930–2025), Spanish missionary and teacher
- Maruxa and Coralia Fandiño Ricart, Spanish sisters, popular figures in Santiago
- Maruxa Vilalta (1932–2014), Catalan-born Mexican playwright and a theatre director
- Maruxa Villanueva (1906–1998), Spanish singer and actress

== See also ==
- Maruxa (opera), 1914 work by Amadeu Vives i Roig
- Maruxa (film), 1923 Spanish film based on the opera
