= Mathias Bogado =

Argentine footballer (born 1990)

Personal information
- Full name: Juan Mathias Bogado Castro
- Date of birth: 23 March 1990 (age 36)
- Place of birth: Buenos Aires, Argentina
- Height: 1.85 m (6 ft 1 in)
- Position: Centre-back

Team information
- Current team: Racing de Córdoba

Youth career
- 2004–2005: Nacional
- 2006: Bella Vista
- 2007–2011: Montevideo Wanderers

Senior career*
Years	Team	Apps	(Gls)
2011–2012	Montevideo Wanderers	3	(0)
2012–2013	Torque	24	(1)
2013	Canadian SC	6	(0)
2014	Talleres	0	(0)
2015–2016	Torque	24	(1)
2016	Jaguares de Córdoba	1	(0)
2017	Oriental	7	(0)
2018–2022	Juventud	108	(1)
2022–2023	Plaza Colonia	22	(0)
2023	Rampla Juniors	5	(0)
2024–	Racing de Córdoba	5	(0)
- * Club domestic league appearances and goals as of 15 September 2024

Juan Mathias Bogado Castro (born 23 March 1990) is an Argentine footballer who plays as a centre-back for Racing de Córdoba.

== Career ==
Bogado started his career with CA Buenos Aires al Pacífico. His family settled 2003 to Uruguay and he started his career here with Nacional de Montevideo. He played for them two years, before signed in Winter 2006 for CA Bella Vista. Bogado played twelve months for Bella Vista and joined than in December 2007 to Montevideo Wanderers After four years in the youth of Montevideo Wanderers, was promoted to the senior team and played his debut with the Wanderers 2011 in the Uruguayan Primera División. Bogado played only three Uruguayan Primera División for Montevideo Wanderers games, before moved to Club Atlético Torque.
