= Israel in the Eurovision Song Contest 1993 =

- Eurovision Song Contest 1993
- Participating broadcaster: Israel Broadcasting Authority (IBA)
- Country: Israel
- Selection process: Kdam Eurovision 1993
- Selection date: 1 April 1993

Competing entry
- Song: "Shiru"
- Artist: Lehakat Shiru
- Songwriters: Shaike Paikov; Yoram Taharlev

Placement
- Final result: 24th, 4 points

Participation chronology

Israel was represented at the Eurovision Song Contest 1993 with the song "Shiru", composed by Shaike Paikov, with lyrics by Yoram Taharlev, and performed by Lehakat Shiru. The Israeli participating broadcaster, the Israel Broadcasting Authority (IBA), selected its entry for the contest through Kdam Eurovision 1993.

== Before Eurovision ==
=== Kdam Eurovision 1993 ===
This Israeli broadcaster, the Israel Broadcasting Authority (IBA), held a national final to select its entry for the Eurovision Song Contest 1993. IBA held the national final at its television studios in Jerusalem, hosted by 1987 co-Israeli representative Nathan Dattner. 12 songs competed, with the winner being decided through the votes of 7 regional juries.

The winner was Lehakat Shiru with the song "Shiru", composed by Shaike Paikov and Yoram Taharlev.

Final – 1 April 1993
R/O	Artist	Song	Points	Place
1	Lehakat Shiru	"Shiru"	67	1
2	Dorit Reuveni	"Bayit biktze hakeshet"	36	6
3	Linet	"Aniana"	7	10
4	Svika Pick	"Artik kartiv"	34	7
5	Doron Mazar	"Re'ach vatzeva"	62	2
6	Shimi Tavori	"Chai et ma sheyesh"	26	8
7	Etti Kari	"Yashar letoch enay"	22	9
8	Adam	"Ad"	56	3
9	Effi Ben-Israel and Nathan Nattanzon	"Marconi"	3	11
10	David D'Or	"Parpar"	53	4
11	Moshik Dar	"Moral"	37	5
12	Reuven Lavi	"Ha'olam kol kach madlik"	1	12

Detailed Regional Jury Votes
R/O	Song	Jerusalem	Karmiel	Or Akiva	Haifa	Nazareth Illit	Beit Shemesh	Tel Aviv	Total
1	"Shiru"	8	12	10	12	6	7	12	67
2	"Bayit biktze hakeshet"	3	5	4	6	4	4	10	36
3	"Aniana"			1	1		5		7
4	"Artik kartiv"	7	3	3	10	7	1	3	34
5	"Re'ach vatzeva"	6	8	12	5	12	12	7	62
6	"Chai et ma sheyesh"	2	2	7	2	8	3	2	26
7	"Yashar letoch enay"	4	6	2	4	2	2	4	22
8	"Ad"	10	7	6	7	10	8	8	56
9	"Marconi"	1	1			1			3
10	"Parpar"	12	10	5	8	3	10	5	53
11	"Moral"	5	4	8	3	5	6	6	37
12	"Ha'olam kol kach madlik"							1	1

== At Eurovision ==
Lehakat Shiru performed 24th on the night of the final, preceding Norway. On stage, the members dressed in traditional Israeli dress, wearing red ribbons in solidarity with people living with HIV/AIDS. Bracha, Haim, Nadler and Proiter were in the center of the stage, while Sharon was on piano and Zamir was backing singer. At the end of the song, they all joined in a row at the front of the stage.

They received 4 points, placing 24th in a field of 25, Israel's worst ever finish in the grand final, and therefore were relegated from participating in the Eurovision Song Contest 1994.

=== Voting ===
Points awarded to Israel
Score	Country
12 points	
10 points	
8 points	
7 points	
6 points	
5 points	
4 points	
3 points	Portugal
2 points	
1 point	France

Points awarded by Israel
Score	Country
12 points	United Kingdom
10 points	Sweden
8 points	France
7 points	Greece
6 points	Croatia
5 points	Ireland
4 points	Switzerland
3 points	Malta
2 points	Iceland
1 point	Spain
