= Marta Tchai =

Spanish musician

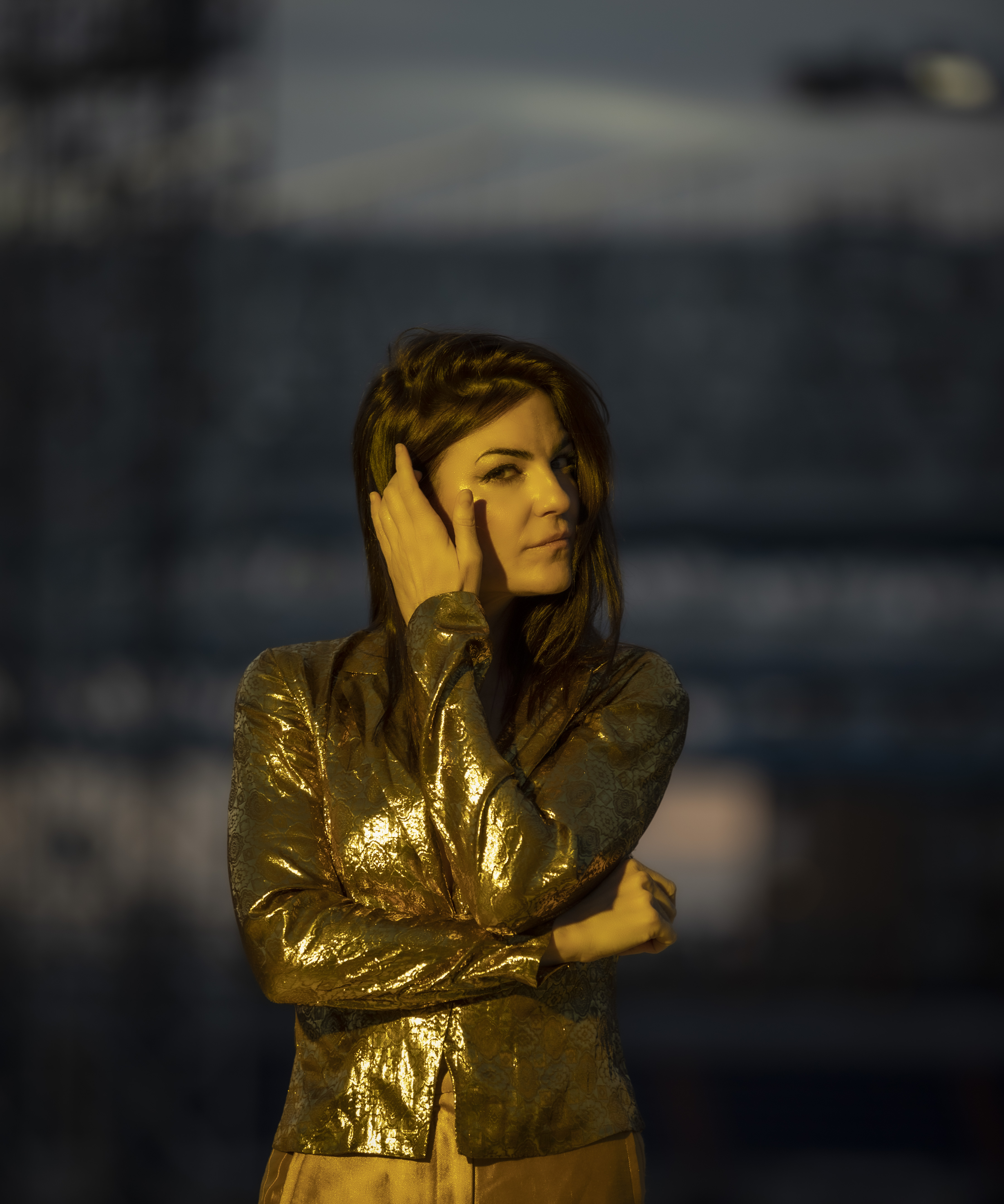

Background information
- Born: Marta Bigeriego
- Origin: Badajoz, (Extremadura), Spain
- Genres: Pop
- Occupations: Singer, composer, dancer and actress
- Instruments: Guitar, voice
- Website: https://www.martatchai.com/

Marta Tchai is the artistic name of Marta Bigeriego, a Spanish composer, singer, dancer, and actress from Extremadura. She has released 6 LPs, most notably El eclipse (2021), and several short films.

== Training ==
Trained in classical ballet with María de Ávila in Zaragoza, and Carmen Roche and Víctor Ullate, in Madrid, she was part of the Turin Ballet and an ankle injury changed her professional destiny. During her recovery, she thought about her creative skills, which had been sidelined as she focused all her energies on her training as a dancer.

She studied acting at the Centro de Interpretación Corazza, among others, and began her interpretative work in the theater. It was at this time when, in one of the plays to be performed, "Gatas en celo", performed live her first songs. Supported by classes at the School of Creative Music, where she received the starting push, she began her career as a self-taught musician. Marta Tchai's stage name derives from her devotion to Tchaikovsky as a dancer.

== Artistic development ==
=== Dance ===
As a dancer, she was part of the company "Joven ballet de Carmen Roche" conducted by Ángel Rodríguez (2002). She was integrated into the Turin Ballet, performing in many shows, including 'Troya siglo XXI' at the Festival de Teatro Clásico de Mérida (2002). In 1999 she won the second prize at the Classical Ballet Festival of Zaragoza, held at the main theater of that city, performing the solo of "Kitri" from Don Quixote.

=== Composer and singer ===
Her first compositions were developed from her old poems, to later create music and lyrics from emotion; pop songs with an intimate character, and composed from a 3x4 rhythm.

"I came a little late to music because I was a classical ballet dancer until I was 25. I started to play the guitar in a very casual way until I realized that I could make songs with the texts I had, because I had been writing poems since I was a little girl. I knew I was going to dedicate myself to it even though neither my father nor my best friend supported me and now I have 5 albums, I have not stopped writing songs. Although at the beginning I didn't know how to play or sing, I have always trusted in my songs, not so much in my voice". Marta Tchai

In Alaluz, her first album (2010), she has the guitars of Juan Gumuzio, a musician from San Sebastian who accompanied her in the early concerts. The album was produced by Santiago Fernández and mixed by José María Rosillo. She has surrounded herself with artists and professionals she admires: Azul, her second album, she had guitarists Pablo Novoa and David Gwynn (Quique González, Christina Rosenvinge), pianist Sergio Salvi (Delaporte, Cosmosoul), violinist Iria Apresto (The Chinese Birdwatchers), Carlos Mirat on drums (Obús, Lucky Dados), Edu Baos and José María Rosillo on production.

In 2013 Tchai released Movimientos Circulares, produced by Paco Loco, repeating with Edu Baos and Carlos Mirat, plus Tarci Ávila (Presumido) on guitars. In 2016 she released Los Amantes, also produced by Paco Loco, with a more surf sound, with Juan Manuel Serrano on guitar, Edu Baos and Carlos Mirat on bass and drums. Los Amantes performed in 2017 in Mexico City, at the mythical Foro del Tejedor.

In 2019 she published her fifth LP, Atención Peligro, produced by Fernando Vacas (Russian Red, Prin Lalá) with Esteban Perles (Leda Tres, Bigott) on drums, Edu Baos and Jota (Juan Manuel Serrano) again, on bass and guitar. It features collaborations with Poochie (Sweet Barrio), Sergio Salvi and Juan Zelada. It was mixed by Luca Petricca at Reno Studios, and mastered by Mario G.Alberni.

In 2019 she also released the collection 4 Estaciones en un día, a set of 4 EPs for each season: Vår, Sommar, Hôst and Vinter. From the latter, the song "Rendición" produced by Sergio Salvi stands out; from Sommar, "Alas de gigante", with the voice of Rubén Pozo, and the collaborations of the flamenco guitarist, Pepe Carmona in "Pueblos sin mar" and the singer-songwriter Alberto Ballesteros in the song "Naúfragos". It was recorded by Dany Richter, and mixed by Karim Burkhalter at Reno Studios. For the double bass she called Héctor Oliveira, and for the guitars again David Gwynn. It also features collaborations with Marcus Wilson, Daniel Montiel and Iria Apresto.

During the pandemic, she presented a new work, creatively developed during the confinement, El eclipse. It was arranged and produced by Raúl Pérez and Berlin Texas, a group Marta formed at the end of 2019 and broke up in April 2021. It was recorded in La Mina (Seville), and four of the tracks feature Mariana Mott on drums.

"I never "seek" with intention to transmit something with any lyric. They are born and then I try to polish them so that the song sounds better, they match the melody or communicate the message in the most beautiful way possible, also understanding that for me rawness is part of beauty. But it is true that 'Los besos' is full of violent verbs: denounce, kidnap, devastate, stick... and also full of sweet verbs: embrace, kiss, bless, answer, forgive... Kisses as a prelude to something else have a lot of that mixture of sweetness and violence." Marta Tchai

Tchai has taken part in the soundtrack of several films, in Nuestros Amantes by Miguel Ángel Lamata, with the theme "Ceremonia", produced by Paco Loco and in Tensión sexual no resuelta, by the same director, with the theme "Comida principal".

=== Performances ===
As a singer-songwriter, she performed at the beginning of her career in small concert halls in Madrid, such as Libertad 8, el Búho real, Sala Clamores, El Sol, Contraclub, Costello, and Sala Galileo, among others. Long before releasing her first album, Alaluz (2010), which was presented in Madrid, in a full Sala Sol, in 2005 she was invited to support Vetusta Morla in the mythical Café La Palma and in 2007 to support El Lichis (La Cabra Mecánica) in Sala Clamores.

In 2011 she performed in London, at the mythical club The Troubadour. In 2017 she took the album Los amantes on tour in Mexico, performing in Guanajuato, Querétaro, San Miguel de Allende, Guadalajara and Mexico City, preceding the Argentine singer Daniela Spalla, and with several shows at Foro del Tejedor, el Hijo del Cuervo, and UNAM.

In the summer of 2017 she plays new songs at open mic in New York and gets to perform at The Rockwood Music Hall, and The Sidewalk Café, among others. In 2018 she opened the IX Edition of Radio3's "El séptimo en Cineteca", with Marcus Wilson and Manuel Preto as guitarists. After the confinement, she presented El Eclipse at Sala Moby Dick, that later has been taken in acoustic format to many places in Spain with FNAC.

=== Interpretation ===
==== Theater/Dance ====
- "Tribute to a poet: J. D. Valhondo" (Teatro López de Ayala, Badajoz, 2000).
- "Troya siglo XXI" (directed by Jorge Márquez, Festival de Teatro Clásico de Mérida, 2003) as a dancer of the Turin Ballet.
- "Bocetos para la estructura de un corazón en 3D" (Cía. Tramonto. Text and Direction: Marta Tchai, 2004).
- "Uno nunca sabe" (directed by Gastón Blanco, 2005).
- "Gatas en celo" (Company "Admira Bikini", directed by Alicia González Rey, 2006) as Victoria.
- "La chica del puente" ("The Colorados" Company, 2011).
- "Electra" (directed by José Carlos Plaza, Festival de Teatro Clásico de Mérida, 2012).

==== Cinema ====
- "Princesas" (feature film by Fernando León de Aranoa, 2004).
- "La Roca y el Mar" (short film directed bySalomé Jiménez, 2018) as Mar.
- "Hermanas" (short film directed by Juanma Costavetsky, 2019) as María.

==== Television ====
- "Hermanos y detectives" (produced by Cuatro Cabezas, 2008).
- "Diarios del miedo" (produced by Cuarto Milenio, 2009).

== Discography ==
- Alaluz (2010)
- En Azul (Audiomatic, 2012)
- Movimientos Circulares (Resistencia, 2013)
- Los Amantes (2016)
- Atención peligro (2018)
- 4 Estaciones en un día (4Eps)) Vår, Sommär, Höst, Vinter. (2019–20)
- El Eclipse (2021)

== Soundtracks ==
- Tensión sexual no resuelta (Miguel Ángel Lamata, 2010 ). Theme: Ceremony
- Nuestros amantes (Miguel Ángel Lamata, 2016 ). Theme: Main meal
