= Edith Alonso =

Spanish musician

- Born: Edith Alonso Sánchez; 1974 (age 51–52); Madrid, Spain
- Genres: electronica, experimental music, sound art
- Occupations: academic, composer
- Instrument: piano
- Years active: 2007 – present
- Website: www.edithalonso.com

Edith Alonso Sánchez (born 1974 in Madrid) is a Spanish composer, improviser, pianist, sound artist and academic who has been involved in the creation of an experimental electronic style that incorporates spoken word, musical sound and visual imagery. She has received a number of awards for her work.

== Life and education ==
Alonso was born in 1974 in Madrid. As a child, she studied classical music and learned to play the piano, and later the saxophone and guitar. She later moved from Madrid to Paris for her doctoral studies. During the 1990s, Alonso played the electric bass in an underground punk rock band in Madrid.

Alonso attended the French university Paris 8 in a program that jointly run with Spanish university Universidad Complutense de Madrid and was in the Facultad de filosofía. In 2009, she successfully defended her doctoral thesis titled La estética de la mùsica acusmàtica en la obra de François Bayle. Following her thesis defense, she was awarded the Société des auteurs, compositeurs et éditeurs de musique (SACEM) prize. She was also given grants from the French Ministry of Research and the Spanish Ministry of Foreign Affairs.

Alonso teaches at the Universidad Autónoma de Madrid and at the Universidad Internacional de la Rioja, working there since 2013 as a professor. She co-founded Campo de Interferencias, a Spanish non-profit dedicated to promoting sound art in Spain.

== Musical development ==
Alonso's involvement with music includes having done a number of roles including being a composer, improviser, pianist, sound artist and academic. Alonso is one of a number of artists involved with the developing of tools to create music in a laboratory style setting, outside the traditional confines of creating new musical sounds.

Alonso, along with Anthony Maubert, developed the musical style Radical dB, a style of electronica that incorporated musical sound, spoken word and visual imagery in 2007. That year, the duo did extensive out outreach to teach others about electronica and Radical dB across Spain. Their outreach included organizing concerts with several musical styles, running interdisciplinary evens with other artists, running courses, talks, and networking on a national and international level. In 2007, they also worked with video, creating a series called Nomades which they showed in Nice, France before showing it in Ireland and the Netherlands.

In 2013, she was one of a number of artists who participated in the second edition of the Sant Carles de la Ràpita hosted Eufònic, an art festival focused on sounds and visuals. In 2014, the duo were in Zaragoza for a music festival, where they demonstrated Radical dB, a new technological approach to creating improvisational musical style with an emphasis on creating new unique musical sounds. In October 2014, she was one of a number of artists to perform at Audiópolis in Madrid. In November 2015, she was one of a number of composers to debut their work at El Festival Coma in Madrid.

In 2016, Alonso continued to develop her unique style of infusing electronic music, the spoken word and visual imagery. In April in Zaragoza, she was involved with a week long musical education program organized by the Ayuntamiento de Zaragoza. As part of the program, she hosted an Open Source course on using freely licensed software and hardware to create new musical sounds. In May 2016, she gave a talk and concert at Medialab Prado in Madrid. Later that month, she gave another concert alongside other artists including Wade Mathews, and Joaquín Mendoza. She worked with actor José Luis Esteban, poet Manuel Vilas for a production at the Teatro de la Estación in Zaragoza in June. This was a continuation of her work in developing Radical dB.

As a composer, one of the pieces Alonso created was "Atardecer en un patio". This work was commissioned by France's Centre de documentation de la musique contemporaine (CDMC). She has also had a work commissioned by Radio Nacional de España. Her compositions have been performed in a number of countries including Portugal, Spain, Austria, Germany, Sweden, South Korea, Cuba, Costa Rica, Columbia, Argentina, and Mexico. As an event organizer, Alonso has also influenced others through the Festival Radical dB, held annually in Zaragoza since 2014. The festival celebrates experimental music and sound art. The 2016 edition was held at the Centro de Arte y Tecnología Etopia. Artists participating at the festival included Agustí Fernández, Joel Ryan, eRikm, Concha Jerez & José Iges, Kaffe Matthews, Robert Lisek, Bosch & Simons, Andrea Borghi, Equipo Elevador, Myungduk Kim, Marco Ferrazza, Juan Antonio Nieto, and Carlos Tricas García.

== Awards ==
Alonso has been given a number of awards and won a number of prizes including the Société des auteurs, compositeurs et éditeurs de musique (SACEM) prize, winning the Madrid Abierto, earning an honorable mention for the Pauline Oliveros Prize and the Hablar en Arte, and getting a nomination for the Prix Europe]].

== Published works ==
She has published academic papers about the musical style she has been involved with creating and examining. One paper was "El concepto de 'imagen-de-lo-sonoro' en la música acusmática según el compositor François Bayle" which was published in Escritura e imagen in 2013. Another paper she published was "Claves de la Música del Siglo XX" also published in Escritura e imagen in 2005. A third paper she published was "The Listener in François Bayle's Works: A resonant subject in a living space" published in 2015 in Organised Sound.
