= Emilio Uranga =

Mexican philosopher

Emilio Uranga González (1921 - October 31, 1988) was a Mexican philosopher.

== Biography ==
Emilio was born in 1921 in Mexico City. He studied at high school hermanos de las escuelas Cristianas, and proceeded to National Autonomous University of Mexico to study medicine in 1941 and left the university in 1944 to study philosophy. He made contact with the philosophical school of José Gaos, and between 1947 and 1948 he joined and lead the Groupo Hiperion, with philosophers Ricardo Guerra, Jorge Portilla, Salvador Reyes Nevares, Fausto Vega, and Luis Villoro, and acted as an introducer of French existentialism to Mexico and developed a "Philosophy of Mexicanness".

== (M) existentialism ==
Sometimes Mexistencialism in which Uranga emphases the fragility of existence through phrases such as nada es seguro (lit:nothing is certain; figuratively: anticipate disaster) and emphasis on the accidentality of life through hard-to translate expressions such as zozobra (lit: capsizing; figuratively: anxiety) nepantla and relajo (to unwind or let-go rather than relax)
