= Eva Santamaría =

- Born: Eva María Delgado Macías; 18 October 1971 (age 54); El Puerto de Santa María (Cádiz), Spain
- Occupation: Singer

Eva María Delgado Macías (born 18 October 1971 in El Puerto de Santa María, Cádiz) better known as Eva Santamaría is a Spanish singer, known for representing Spain at the Eurovision Song Contest 1993 with her song "Hombres" (Men), composed by the journalist Carlos Toro.

Before participating in the song festival, Santamaría became well known for participating in the musical television programs Gente Joven, El Salero and Las Coplas. She also collaborated with other artists on several albums and presented her own radio show on Radio Nacional de España. In the months before the Contest in early 1993, Carlos Toro helped Santamaría record her debut album A buen puerto (Successful) in Los Angeles, on which "Hombres" became a hit single. To date, however, this album was her only release.

Coming off the album's success, Televisión Española selected Santamaría to represent the network and all of Spain at Eurovision 1993 in Millstreet, Ireland, with her hit "Hombres." She beat out other popular singers such as Yossek and Julián Contreras. Her song placed eleventh out of 25 in the Contest.

Santamaría did not pursue her pop career after disagreements with her manager, and sporadically appeared on television since then. She has since dedicated her focus on theatre and singing copla.

Preceded by Serafín Zubiri with "Todo esto es la música"	Spain in the Eurovision Song Contest; 1993	Succeeded by Alejandro Abad with "Ella no es ella"
