= Estíbaliz Uranga =

Spanish singer (born 1952)

- Birth name: Estíbaliz Uranga Amézaga
- Born: 9 December 1952 (age 72); Bilbao (Biscay), Spain
- Occupation: Singer
- Member of: El Consorcio
- Formerly of: Mocedades; Sergio y Estíbaliz

Estíbaliz Uranga Amézaga (9 December 1952 in Bilbao, Basque Country, Spain) is a Spanish singer, best known as a member of the folk group Mocedades, as part of the duo Sergio y Estíbaliz and nowadays as a member of the group El Consorcio.

In the late 1960s, she initially teamed up with her two sisters Amaya and Izaskun to form Las hermanas Uranga ("The Uranga sisters"), which developed with the inclusion of further siblings and friends into the group Voces y Guitarras ("Voices and Guitars"). By 1969, they were discovered by producer Juan Carlos Calderón, who took them on and renamed them to Mocedades ("Youth").

Estíbaliz left Mocedades after three albums in 1972 to form with fellow Mocedades singer Sergio Blanco the duo Sergio y Estíbaliz.

Sergio y Estíbaliz took part in the Eurovision Song Contest 1975 and reached 10th place with their greatest hit "Tú volverás", released in English as You'll Return. In the same year Estíbaliz and Sergio married. Until 1993 the duo had numerous successes in Spain and Latin America.

In 1993, Estíbaliz and Sergio formed with other former members of Mocedades the group El Consorcio, which until 2008 produced 12 albums.
