= El Consorcio =

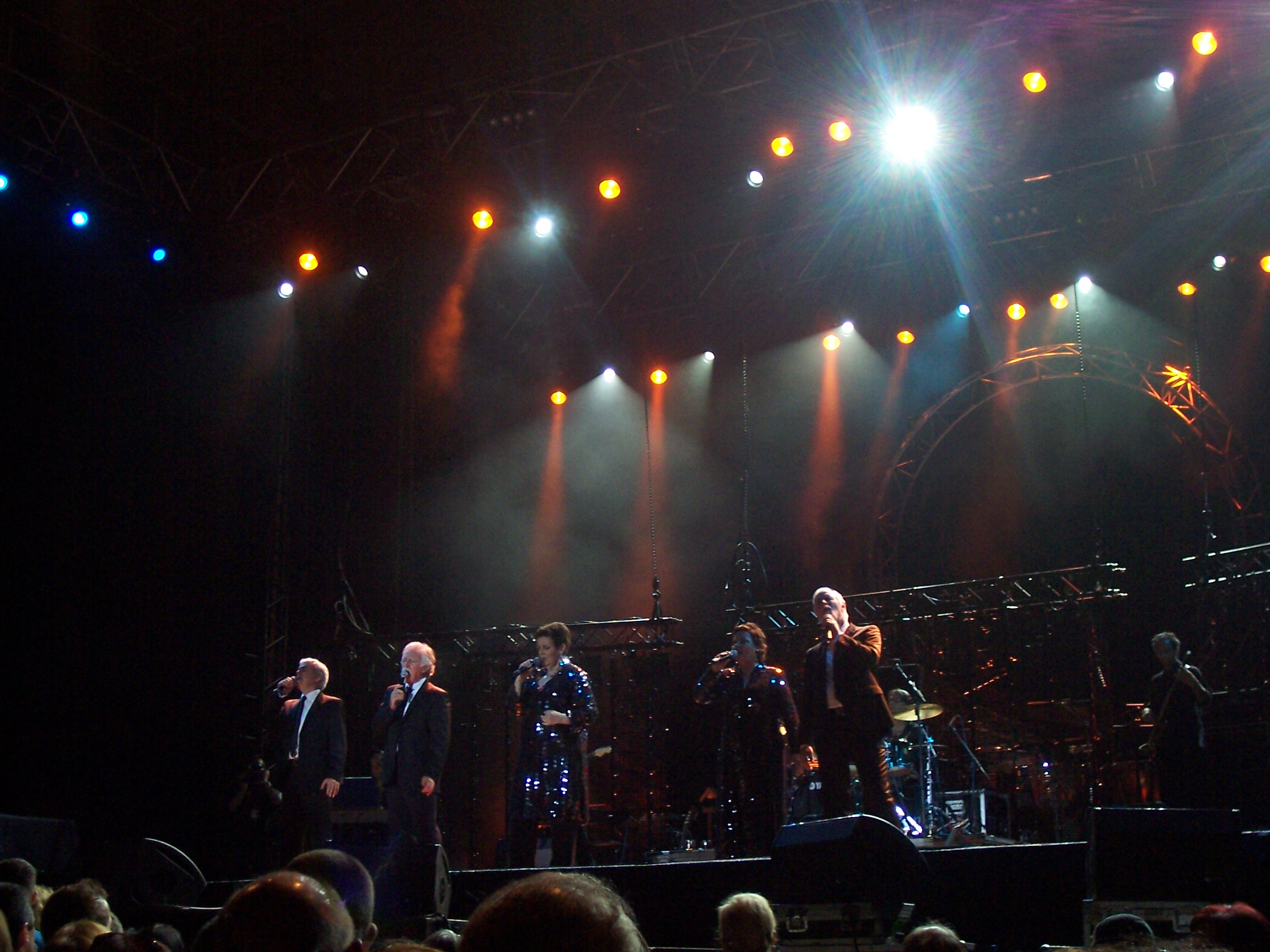
- El Consorcio in 2009. From left to right: Iñaki, Carlos, Amaya, Estíbaliz and Sergio

Background information
- Origin: Bilbao, Spain
- Genres: Canción melódica, pop
- Years active: 1993–present
- Labels: Hispavox, EMI Music, Sony Music
- Members: Amaya Uranga; Estíbaliz Uranga; Iñaki Uranga; Carlos Zubiaga
- Past members: Sergio Blanco (died 2015)

El Consorcio is a Spanish singing group from Bilbao, formed in 1993 by singers Amaya, Estíbaliz and Iñaki Uranga, Carlos Zubiaga and Sergio Blanco, all of them past members of the singing group Mocedades. In 2016 they received the Latin Grammy Lifetime Achievement Award.

== Discography ==
=== Studio albums ===
- Lo que nunca muere (1994)
- Peticiones del oyente (1995)
- Programa doble (1996)
- Cuba (1998)
- Las canciones de mi vida (2000)
- De ida y vuelta (2005)
- Querido Juan (2008)
- Noche de ronda (2012)

=== Compilation albums ===
- El Consorcio (1996)
- Grandes éxitos (1997)
- Cachito mío (2001)
- Los diez de El Consorcio (2002)
- Lo mejor (2003)
- El Consorcio (2006)
- Canciones para toda la vida (2007)
- De Mocedades a El Consorcio. 40 años de música (2010)
- Grandes intérpretes (2012)
- El Consorcio grandes éxitos 1993-2015 (2016)
- Eres Tú. Más de 50 grandes éxitos. 3 CDs + DVD (2017)

=== Live Albums ===
- En vivo desde el corazón de México (2003)
