= Pilar Bogado =

Spanish flamenco singer

Pilar Bogado Cruzado is a Flamenco singer from Moguer in the province of Huelva, Spain.
