= Izaskun Uranga =

Spanish musician (born 1950)

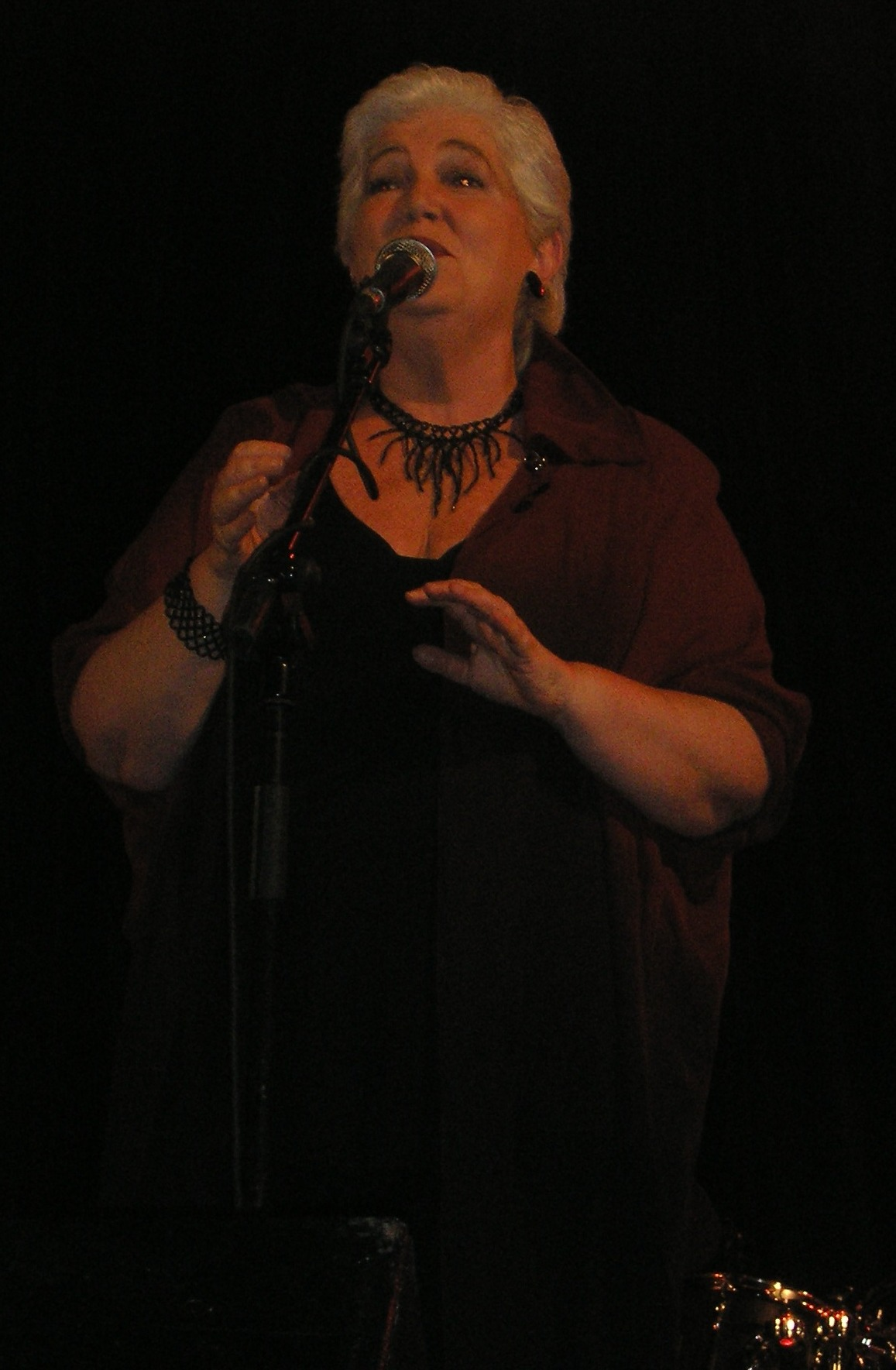

Background information
- Born: Izaskun Uranga Amézaga; 17 April 1950 (age 75); Bilbao (Biscay), Spain
- Occupation: Singer
- Member of: Mocedades

Izaskun Uranga Amézaga (born 17 April 1950) is a Spanish musician, who with her two sisters Estibaliz Uranga and Amaya Uranga formed the group "Las Hermanas Urangas", which became "Voces y Guitarras" and, in 1969, the well-known Spanish folk group Mocedades.

Uranga is the only one of the tens of past and present members of Mocedades to last from its inception to present day, although she took time off in 1978 after the birth of her daughter and in 1982 due to illness. At these times, her sister, Idoia Uranga, usually took her place in concerts. Nowadays, Uranga remains a member of one of the two Mocedades groups that currently exist.
