= Amaya Uranga =

Spanish singer from Bilbao (born 1947)

- Birth name: María Icíar Amaya Uranga Amézaga
- Born: 18 February 1947 (age 78); Bilbao (Biscay), Spain
- Occupation: Singer
- Member of: El Consorcio
- Formerly of: Mocedades

Amaya Uranga Amezaga (born 18 February 1947) is a Spanish singer from Bilbao, best known for the 15 years she spent as a member of the Basque folk/pop sextet Mocedades. She is a cousin of director Pablo Berger.

== Biography ==
Uranga formed Mocedades in 1969 with eight members. After numerous group changes, Uranga together with her sister Izaskun, her brother Roberto, and three other male members became the so-called "historic six" members of Mocedades who came second in the 1973 Eurovision Song Contest with the song "Eres Tú", and the band subsequently launched a hugely successful music career in Spain and Latin America.

She was lead singer on many of Mocedades' most successful songs, such as the international smash hit "Eres Tú" and "Tómame o Déjame."

=== Solo career ===
Uranga left Mocedades in 1984 to pursue a solo career, although she failed to surpass her success in Mocedades. In the mid-1990s, Uranga joined a new band called El Consorcio. She has also appeared as herself many times on Spanish-language television shows. Amaya performed from a wheelchair in 2011 after breaking her femur.
