= Danish Music Awards =

Danish award show

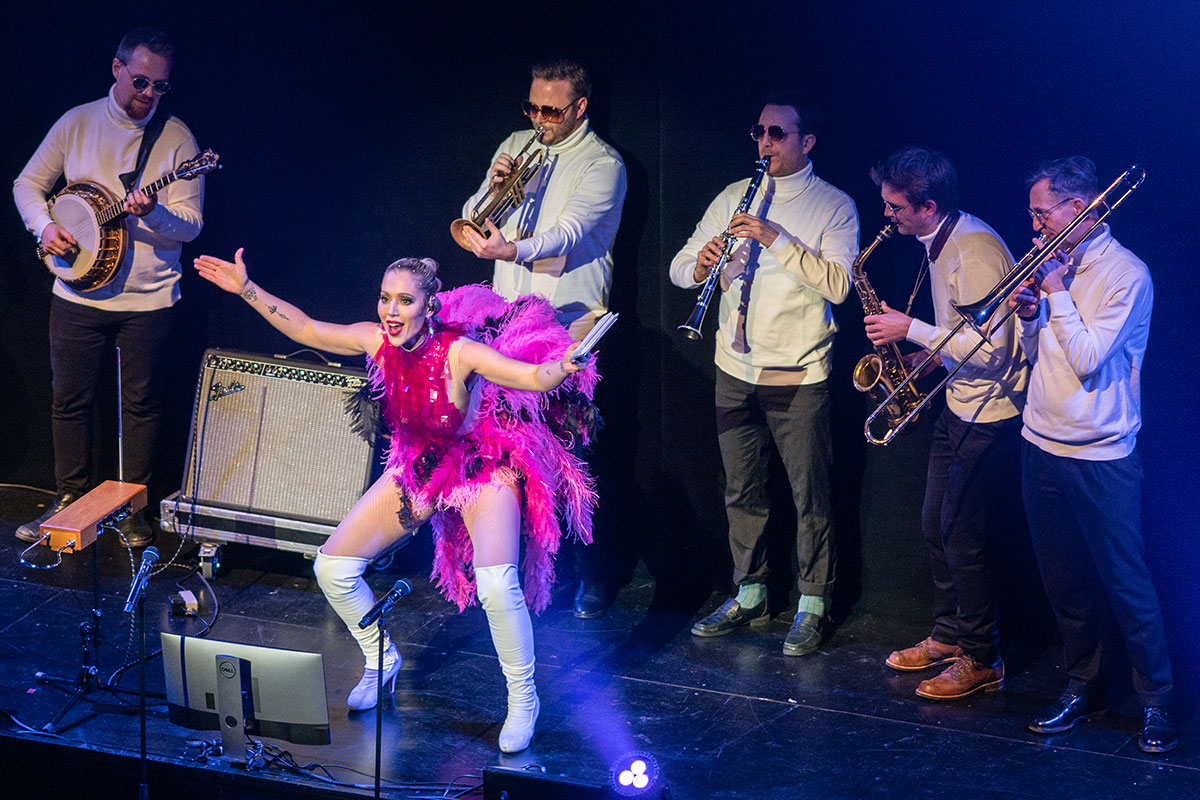

The Danish Music Awards (DMA) is a Danish award show. The show has been arranged by IFPI since 1989, and was originally called IFPI-prisen ("IFPI Award") until 1991, when it changed its name to Dansk Grammy ("Danish Grammy"). It was changed to its current name, Danish Music Awards in 2001, after the American Grammy Awards registered the name "Grammy" as their trademark. In 2011, IFPI joined together with TV 2 and KODA to present the awards ceremony.

== IFPI Awards 1989 ==
The 1989 Danish IFPI Awards were held on 25 February 1989 in K.B. Hallen, Frederiksberg.

Category	Winner
Danish Album of the Year	Anne Linnet – Jeg er jo lige her
Danish Band of the Year	Dodo and the Dodos
Danish Female Artist of the Year	Hanne Boel
Danish Male Artist of the Year	Thomas Helmig
Danish Hit of the Year	Søs Fenger, Thomas Helmig, Sanne Salomonsen & Anne Linnet – "Den jeg elsker, elsker jeg"
Foreign Album of the Year	Tracy Chapman – Tracy Chapman
Press Award	Johnny Madsen

== IFPI Awards 1990 ==
The 1990 Danish IFPI Awards were held on 25 February 1990 in K.B. Hallen, Frederiksberg to be replaced the following year by the Danish Grammy Awards that continued from 1991 until 2000.

Category	Winner
Danish Album of the Year	Gnags – Mr. Swing King
Danish Band of the Year	Gnags
Danish Female Artist of the Year	Søs Fenger
Danish Male Artist of the Year	Lars H.U.G
Danish Hit of the Year	Kim Larsen – "Tarzan Mama Mia"
Foreign Album of the Year	Phil Collins – But Seriously
Press Award	Lars H.U.G
Best New Name	Nikolaj Christensen

== Danish Grammy Awards ==
Award renamed in 1991.

== Danish Grammy Awards 1991 ==
Category	Winner
Danish Album of the Year	Hanne Boel – Dark Passion
Danish Band of the Year	Ray Dee Ohh
Danish Female Artist of the Year	Hanne Boel
Danish Male Artist of the Year	Søren Sko
Danish Newcomer of the Year	Sko/Torp
Danish Hit of the Year	Hanne Boel – "I Wanna Make Love to You"
Foreign Album of the Year	Gary Moore – Still Got the Blues
Foreign Female Singer of the Year	Sinéad O'Connor
Foreign Male Singer of the Year	Björn Afzelius
Foreign Hit of the Year	Sinéad O'Connor – "Nothing Compares 2 U"
Foreign Newcomer of the Year	Wilson Phillips
Danish Rock Album of the Year	C.V. Jørgensen – I det muntre hjørne
Danish Pop Album of the Year	Love Shop – 1990
Danish Rap/Dance Album of the Year	Yasmin – Wanna Dance
Danish Entertainment Album of the Year	De Nattergale – Det kan jo aldrig gå værre en hiel gal
Danish Heavy Rock Album of the Year	Skagarack – A Slice of Heaven
Danish Children's Album of the Year	Bamse & Kylling – Sange fra Bamses Billedbog 2
Danish Songwriter Album of the Year	C.V. Jørgensen
Danish Producer of the Year	Poul Bruun for Hanne Boel – Dark Passion
Danish Music Video of the Year	Hanne Boel – "Light In Your Heart"
Danish Best Cover	Anne Dorte Michelsen – Den ordløse time
Danish Folk/Country/Western Album of the Year	Lars Lilholt Band – Kontakt
Danish Classical Album of the Year	Ars Nova Vocal Group – Nicolas Gombert Sacred Music
Danish Jazz Album of the Year	Thomas Blachman – Love Boat

== Danish Grammy Awards 2000 ==
2000 was the last year the awards were held under the title Danish Grammy Awards. After the American Grammy organization objecting, the show would be renamed Danish Music Awards starting 2001.

The last Danish "Grammies" were held on 5 February 2000 in the Forum, Frederiksberg. The show was broadcast live on TV 2, and was hosted by Casper Christensen and Krede.

Category	Winner
Danish Album of the Year	Kashmir – The Good Life
Danish Band of the Year	Kashmir
Danish Female Artist of the Year	Marie Frank
Danish Male Artist of the Year	Thomas Helmig
Danish Newcomer of the Year/Tuborg's Green Prise	Marie Frank
Danish Hit of the Year	Det Brune Punktum – "Jeg vil i seng med de fleste"
Foreign Album of the Year	The Cardigans – Gran Turismo
Foreign Hit of the Year	Shania Twain – "That Don't Impress Me Much"
Foreign Newcomer of the Year	Britney Spears
Danish Rock Album of the Year	Kashmir – The Good Life
Danish Pop Album of the Year	Marie Frank – Ancient Pleasures
Danish Entertainment Album of the Year	Det Brune Punktum – Helbredelsen
Danish Rap Album of the Year	Clemens – Den Anden Verden
Danish Dance Album of the Year	Brother Brown presents Frank'ee – "Under the Water"
Danish Roots Album of the Year	Dissing, Dissing, Von Daler m.fl. – Græsset må betrædes
Danish Children's Album of the Year	Creamy – Creamy
Danish Top Album of the Year	Jacob Haugaard – Jeg er så lyk'lig
Danish Soundtrack of the Year	Various Artists – Den eneste ene
Danish Songwriter of the Year	Kasper Eistrup (Kashmir)
Danish Producer of the Year	Joshua & Kashmir for Kashmir – The Good Life
Danish Music Video of the Year	Klaus Thymann for Kashmir – "Mom In Love, Daddy In Space"
Danish radio Hit of the Year/The Voice Prize	Det Brune Punktum – "Vi skal ud i det blå"
Danish Club Hit of the Year	Barcode Brothers – "Dooh Dooh"
Export Prize	Cartoons
IFPI's Prize of Honor	Gnags

Performances

Performances during the show included Det Brune Punktum, Clemens & Petter, Creamy, Marie Frank, Funkstar De Luxe, Hampenberg, Thomas Helmig, Juice, Kashmir, Poul Krebs, Melanie C, Ms Mukupa & Remee and Shirley, Zindy, Daniel, Jonas Winge Leisner, Kuku Agami & Mark Linn from soundtrack of the film Den eneste ene.

Starting 2001, the awards were held under the name Danish Music Awards after ten years as Danish Grammy Awards. The American Grammies management had protested the use of the name "Grammies" by the Danes and the Danish management was forced to bow to pressure and change the name from Danish Grammy Awards to Danish Music Awards.

== Danish Music Awards 2001 ==
The first ever Danish Music Awards under the new name was held on 3 March 2001 in the Forum, Frederiksberg. The inaugural "Danish Music Awards" show was broadcast live on TV 2, and was hosted by Casper Christensen and Lasse Rimmer.

The Winners

Category	Winner
Danish Album of the Year	D-A-D – Everything Glows
Danish Band of the Year	D-A-D
Danish Female Artist of the Year	Freya
Danish Male Artist of the Year	Jesper Binzer (D-A-D)
Danish Newcomer of the Year	Erann DD
Danish Hit of the Year	Brødrene Olsen (aka Olsen Brothers) – "Fly on the Wings of Love"
Foreign Album of the Year	Madonna – Music
Foreign Hit of the Year	Madonna – "Music"
Foreign Newcomer of the Year	Anastacia
Danish Rock Album of the Year	D-A-D – Everything Glows
Danish Pop Album of the Year	Aqua – Aquarius
Danish R&B Album of the Year	Karen – En til en
Danish Rap Album of the Year	Outlandish – Outland's Officials
Danish Dance Album of the Year	Barcode Brothers – Swipe Me
Danish Entertainment Album of the Year	Hva' snakker du om? – Den ka' byttes Vol. 1
Danish Children's Album of the Year	Musikken fra Pyrus i Alletiders Eventyr
Danish Top Album of the Year	Kandis – Kandis 8
Danish Soundtrack of the Year	Blinkende Lygter
Danish Songwriter of the Year	Allan Olsen – Onomatopoietikon
Danish Producer of the Year	Filur – Exciting Comfort
Danish Music Video of the Year	Peder Pedersen / Easy Film for Aqua – "Around the World"
Danish Radio Hit of the Year	Zididada – "Zididada Day"
Danish Club Hit of the Year	Safri Duo – "The Bongo Song (Played-A-Live)"
Export Prize	Aqua
IFPI's Prize of Honor	Gasolin'

Performances

Performances during the show included Anastacia, Bliss, Tim Christensen, DJ Aligator, Erann DD, Filur, Karen, Manic Street Preachers, Outlandish, Rollo & King, Safri Duo, S.O.A.P., Superheroes and tv·2.

== Danish Music Awards 2002 ==
The 2002 Danish Music Awards were held on 2 March 2002 in the Forum, Frederiksberg. The show was broadcast live on TV 2, and was hosted by Lars Hjortshøj.

Category	Winner
Danish Album of the Year	Safri Duo – Episode II
Danish Band of the Year	Safri Duo
Danish Female Artist of the Year	Marie Frank
Danish Male Artist of the Year	Thomas Helmig
Danish Newcomer of the Year	Christian
Danish Hit of the Year/Orange Prize	Safri Duo – "Played-A-Live (The Bongo Song)"
Foreign Album of the Year	R.E.M. – Reveal
Foreign Hit of the Year	Kylie Minogue – "Can't Get You Out of My Head"
Foreign Newcomer of the Year	Dido
Danish Rock Album of the Year	Saybia – Saybia
Danish Pop Album of the Year	Christian – Du kan gøre hvad du vil
Danish Rap Album of the Year	Den Gale Pose – Definitition af en stodder
Danish Dance Album of the Year	Safri Duo – Episode II
Danish Top Album of the Year	Birthe Kjær – Længe leve livet
Danish Children's Album of the Year	M:G:P: 2001 – De unges Melodi Grand Prix
Danish Entertainment Album of the Year	Hva' snakker du om? – Arne fortæller… Terkel i knibe
Danish Soundtrack Album of the Year	En kort en lang
Danish Songwriter of the Year	Thomas Helmig for IsItYouIsItMe
Danish Producer of the Year	Morten Friis/Uffe Savery/Michael Parsberg for Safri Duo – Episode II
Danish Music Video of the Year	Angel Productions for Peter Frödin & Jimmy Jørgensen – "Vent på mig"
Danish Radio Hit of the Year/The Voice Prize	Safri Duo – "Played-A-Live (The Bongo Song)"
Danish Club Hit of the Year	Infernal – "Muzaik"
Danish Music Export Award	Safri Duo – "Episode II"
IFPI's Prize of Honor	C.V. Jørgensen

Performances

Performances during the show included Christian, EyeQ, Sort Sol, Thomas Helmig, DJ Encore, Hampenberg, Barcode Brothers, Westlife, D-A-D, Safri Duo, Swan Lee og Kylie Minogue.

== Danish Music Awards 2003 ==
The 2003 Danish Music Awards were held on 1 March 2003 in the Forum, Frederiksberg. The show was broadcast live on TV 2, and hosted by Timm Vladimir.

Category	Winners
Danish Album of the Year	Saybia – The Second You Sleep
Danish Band of the Year	Saybia
Danish Female Artist of the Year	Søs Fenger
Danish Male Artist of the Year	Søren Huus (Saybia)
Danish Newcomer of the Year	Nik & Jay
Danish Hit of the Year/The Voice Prize	Nik & Jay – "Hot"
Foreign Album of the Year	Eminem – The Eminem Show
Foreign Newcomer of the Year	Avril Lavigne
Danish Rock Album of the Year	The Raveonettes – Whip It On
Danish Pop Album of the Year	tv·2 – På kanten af småt brændbart
Danish Rap Album of the Year	Malk de Koijn – Sneglzilla
Danish Dance Album of the Year	Filur – Deeply Superficial
Danish Top Album of the Year	Kandis – Kandis 9
Danish Children's Album of the Year	Ruben – Drengen der kunne tale med ting
Danish Songwriter of the Year	Steffen Brandt for tv·2 – På kanten af småt brændbart
Danish Producer of the Year	Nikolaj Nørlund for Superjeg – Alt er ego
Danish Music Video of the Year	Ingen Frygt for Malk de Koijn – "Vi tager fuglen på dig"
Danish Album Cover of the Year	Per Morten Abramsen / Rene Brokop & Nego & Brando for Jupiter Day – Jupiter Day
IFPI's Prize of Honor	Peter Belli

Performances

Live performances included Blue, Tim Christensen, Filur feat. Pernille Rosendahl, Junior Senior, Kashmir, Melanie C, Mew, Nik & Jay, Outlandish, Sanne Salomonsen and tv·2.

== Danish Music Awards 2004 ==
2004 Danish Music Awards was held on 28 February 2004 i the Forum, Frederiksberg. The show was broadcast live on TV 2, hosted by Timm Vladimir.

The Winners

Category	Winner
Danish Album of the Year	Tim Christensen – Honeyburst
Danish Band of the Year	Kashmir
Danish Female Artist of the Year	Julie
Danish Male Artist of the Year	Tim Christensen
Danish Newcomer of the Year	Julie
Danish Best Hit/The Voice Prize	Outlandish – "Aïcha"
Foreign Album of the Year	Robbie Williams – Escapology
Foreign Newcomer of the Year	Evanescence
Foreign Hit of the Year	Dido – "White Flag"
Danish Rock Album of the Year	Kashmir – Zitilites
Danish Pop Album of the Year	Julie – Home
Danish Rap/Hip-Hop Album of the Year	Jokeren – Alpha Han
Danish Dance Album of the Year	Rune – "Calabria"
Danish Top Album of the Year	Birthe Kjær – På en fransk altan
Danish Children's Album of the Year	Svedbanken – Chris & Chokoladefabrikken
Danish Songwriter of the Year	Tina Dickow
Danish Producer of the Year	Tim Christensen og Rune Nissen-Petersen for Tim Christensen – Honeyburst
Danish Music Video of the Year	Anders Morgenthaler for Kashmir – "Rocket Brothers"
Danish Cover of the Year	Kasper Eistrup, Mads Tunebjerg, Nanna Bentel og Morten Bjarnhof for Kashmir – Zitilites
IFPI's Prize of Honor	Sebastian

Performances

The performances during the show included L.O.C., Kevin Lyttle, The Raveonettes, Swan Lee, Jokeren, Burhan G, Tim Christensen, Tue West, Erann DD, Bent Fabric and Blue.

== Danish Music Awards 2005 ==
2005 Danish Music Awards were held on 5 March 2005 in K.B. Hallen, Frederiksberg. The show was broadcast live on DR1, presented by Caroline Henderson and Thomas Madvig.

The Winners

Category	Winners
Danish Album of the Year	Nephew – USADSB
Danish Band of the Year	Nephew
Danish Female Artist of the Year	Pernille Rosendahl (Swan Lee)
Danish Male Artist of the Year	Claus Hempler
Danish Newcomer of the Year	Burhan G
Danish Hit of the Year	Nephew – "Movie Klip"
Foreign Album of the Year	U2 – How to Dismantle an Atomic Bomb
Foreign Newcomer of the Year	Franz Ferdinand – Franz Ferdinand
Foreign Hit of the Year	Franz Ferdinand – "Take Me Out"
Danish Rock Album of the Year	Nephew – USADSB
Danish Pop Album of the Year	Tue West – Tue West
Danish Urban Album of the Year	Blue Foundation – Sweep of Days
Danish Top Album of the Year	Souvenirs – Cirkus
Danish Children's Album of the Year	Sigurd Barrett – Sigurd & Symfoniorkestret vol. 2
Danish Songwriter of the Year	Mikael Simpson
Danish Music Video of the Year	Nephew – "Superliga"
IFPI's Prize of Honor	Sanne Salomonsen

Performances

Performances during the show included Nephew, D-A-D, Nik & Jay, Peter Sommer, Saybia, Allan Olsen, Junior Senior, Nobody Beats The Beats, Niarn, Clemens, Ataf and Kira & The Kindred Spirits.

== Danish Music Awards 2006 ==
The 2006 Danish Music Awards were held on 11 March 2006 in KB-Hallen, Frederiksberg. Show was broadcast live on DR1, and hosted by Jakob Riising.

The Winners

Category	Winner
Danish Album of the Year	Mew – And the Glass Handed Kites
Danish Band of the Year	Mew
Danish Female Artist of the Year	Tina Dickow
Danish Male Artist of the Year	Jonas Bjerre (Mew)
Danish Newcomer of the Year	Magtens Korridorer
Danish Hit of the Year	tv·2 – "De første kærester på månen"
Danish Rock Album of the Year	Mew – And the Glass Handed Kites
Danish Pop Album of the Year	tv·2 – De første kærester på månen
Danish Urban/R&B Album of the Year	Pelding & Joy Morgan – Spine
Danish Rap/Hip-Hop Album of the Year	Bikstok Røgsystem – Over stok og sten
Best Danish Release	Bent Fabricius Bjerre – Kender du melodien
Danish Children's Album of the Year	Alberte, Thomas Winding and Jan Rørdam – Sludder & Vrøvl
Danish Songwriter of the Year	Steffen Brandt (tv·2)
Danish Producer of the Year	Pharfar for Bikstok Røgsystem – Over stok og sten
Danish Music Video of the Year	Martin de Thurah for Carpark North – "Human"
Foreign Album of the Year	Gorillaz – Demon Days
Foreign Newcomer of the Year	Antony & The Johnsons – I Am a Bird Now
Foreign Hit of the Year	Gorillaz – "Feel Good Inc."
IFPI's Prize of Honor	tv·2

Performances

Performances during the show included Mew, Gavin DeGraw with DR's Big Band, Outlandish, Tina Dickow, Bikstok Røgsystem, Anna David, Johnny Deluxe, Carpark North, Tue West, Anders Matthesen and Kasper Eistrup.

== Danish Music Awards 2007 ==
The 2007 Danish Music Awards were held on 3 March 2007 in KB-Hallen, Frederiksberg. Show was broadcast live on DR1, and was hosted by Jakob Riising.

Category	Winner
Danish Album of the Year	Nephew – Interkom kom ind
Danish Band of the Year	Nephew
Danish Female Artist of the Year	Kira Skov (Kira & The Kindred Spirits)
Danish Male Artist of the Year	Teitur
Danish Newcomer of the Year	VETO
Danish Hit of the Year	Nephew – "Igen & Igen &"
Danish Rock Album of the Year	Nephew – Interkom kom ind
Danish Pop Album of the Year	Peter Sommer – Destruktive Vokaler
Danish Electronica Album of the Year	Trentemøller – The Last Resort
Danish Hip-Hop Album of the Year	Johnson – Det passer
Danish Children's Album of the Year	Various Artists – Der var engang en dreng
Danish Songwriter Album of the Year	Mikael Simpson
Danish Producer of the Year	Trentemøller – The Last Resort
Danish Music Video of the Year	Peder Pedersen for VETO – "We Are Not Your Friends"
Foreign Album of the Year	Justin Timberlake – FutureSex/LoveSounds
Foreign Newcomer of the Year	Gnarls Barkley – St. Elsewhere
IFPI's Prize of Honor	Røde Mor

Performances

- Nik & Jay – "Boing!"
- Natasja – "Op med hovedet"
- Mikael Simpson – "Jeg sidder fast"
- Thomas Helmig featuring KNA Connected – "Det du kan"
- Ida Corr with DR Big Band – "Late Night Bimbo"
- Trolle//Siebenhaar – "Sweet Dogs"
- Nephew – "Igen & Igen &"
- Kenneth Bager – "The Sound of Swing"
- James Morrison med DR Big Band – Wonderful World
- VETO – "You Are A Knife"
- Rasmus Nøhr – "Sommer i Europa"

== Danish Music Awards 2008 ==
The 2008 Danish Music Awards were held on 23 February 2008 in Glassalen, Tivoli, Copenhagen and was hosted by Jan Gintberg.

The Winners

Category	Winner
Danish Album of the Year	Natasja – I Danmark er jeg født
Danish Band of the Year	Dúné – We Are In Here You Are Out Here
Danish Female Artist of the Year	Natasja – I Danmark er jeg født
Danish Male Artist of the Year	Thomas Troelsen (Private)
Danish Newcomer of the Year	Dúné
Danish Hit of the Year	Alphabeat – "10.000 Nights of Thunder"
Danish Rock Album of the Year	Dúné – We Are In Here You Are Out Here
Danish Pop Album of the Year	Alphabeat – Alphabeat
Danish Electronice Album of the Year	Efterklang – Parades
Danish Hip-Hop Album of the Year	Suspekt – Prima Nocte
Danish Hard Rock Album of the Year	Hatesphere – Serpent Smiles and Killer Eyes
Danish Urban Album of the Year	Natasja – I Danmark er jeg født
Danish Voxpop Album of the Year	Anne Linnet – Akvarium
Danish Children's Album of the Year	Diverse kunstnere – Cykelmyggen & Dansemyggen
Danish Songwriter Album of the Year	Natasja
Danish Producer of the Year	Thomas Troelsen for Private – My Secret Lover
Danish Music Video of the Year	Ohhmarymary for JaConfetti – "Step Up"
Danish Artwork of the Year	Hvass, Hannibal & Ufex for Efterklang – Parades
Foreign Album of the Year	Amy Winehouse – Back to Black
Foreign Newcomer of the Year	Mika – Life in Cartoon Motion
Foreign Hit of the Year	Timbaland vs. Nephew featuring Keri Hilson & D.O.E – "The Way I Are"
IFPI's Prize of Honor	Anne Linnet

Performances

- Kiss Kiss Kiss – "Hector"
- Aura – "Are You for Sale", "Something from Nothing" og "Song for Sophie"
- Dúné – "80 Years" og "Bloodlines"
- Anne Linnet – "Glor på vinduer" (featuring Szhirley) og "Jeg ka' ik' sige nej til dig"
- Tina Dickow – "Cruel to the Sensitive Kind" og "On the Run"
- Volbeat – "Pool of Booze", "The Garden's Tale" (featuring Johan Olsen) og "Sad Man's Tongue"

== Danish Music Awards 2009 ==
The Winners

Category	Winner
Danish Album of the Year	L.O.C. – Melankolia/XxxCouture
Danish Band of the Year	VETO
Danish Female Artist of the Year	Aura Dione
Danish Male Artist of the Year	Peter Sommer
Danish Newcomer of the Year	Choir of Young Believers
Danish Hit of the Year	Lizzie – "Ramt i natten"
Danish Rock Album of the Year	Peter Sommer – Til rotterne, til kragerne, til hundene
Danish Pop Album of the Year	Aura – Columbine
Danish Electronice Album of the Year	Mike Sheridan – I Syv Sind
Danish Hip-Hop Album of the Year	L.O.C. – Melankolia/XxxCouture
Danish Hard Rock Album of the Year	A Kid Hereafter in the Grinding Light – A Kid Hereafter in the Grinding Light
Danish Singer/Songwriter Album of the Year	Teitur – The Singer
Danish Voxpop Album of the Year	Anne Linnet – Anne Linnet
Danish Children's Album of the Year	Kaya Brüel – Med Dannebrog på næsen
Danish Songwriter of the Year	Peter Sommer
Danish Producer of the Year	Rune Rask & Jonas Vestergaard for L.O.C. – Melankolia/XxxCouture
Danish Music Video of the Year	Thomas J. Mikkelsen & Dennis Holck Petersen for UFO Yepha – "Næh Næh"
Danish Artwork of the Year	Martin Furze for Natasja – Shooting Star
Foreign Album of the Year	Kings of Leon – Only by the Night
Foreign Newcomer of the Year	MGMT – Oracular Spectacular
Foreign Hit of the Year	Duffy – "Mercy"
IFPI's Prize of Honor	Love Shop

Performances

Performance by these artists:

- Sys Bjerre – "Sandpapir" and "Pik"
- Peter Sommer – "Til rotterne, til kragerne, til hundene" and "Chancetur"
- Mike Sheridan – "Krisehjælp" (featuring Nicolaj Rasted), "Too Close" (featuring Mads Langer) and "Fact-Fiction" (featuring Mads Langer).
- VETO – "Blackout" and "You Say Yes, I Say Yes"
- Balstyrko – "Intet stopper helt" and "Jagten paa noget"
- Love Shop – "Alle har en drøm at befri", "Love Goes On Forever" and "Kræmmersjæl"

Prizes were given in 22 categories of these are eight different musical genre from children's albums to electronica. 52 different artists or bands had 89 nominations at the Danish Music Awards 2009. More than 46% of the nominees are women or had women as their main artist. One fourth of the nominees were newcomers.

== Danish Music Awards 2010 ==
Danish Music Awards 2010 was held at the Bremen Theatre in Copenhagen, Denmark on Sunday 14 November 2010. The host was songwriter and producer Søren Rasted. The show was not shown live on Danish TV. This was the first that the IFPI, World Music Denmark, Jazz Danmark and Folkemusikkens Fælles Sekretariat joined forces and made one joint music award event.

The awards were given to 20 different music categories. The prize Steppeulven for Hope of the Year was given by the Foreningen af Danske Musikkritikere (Association of Danish Music Critics).

The Winners

Category	Winner
Dansish Album of the Year	Medina – Velkommen til Medina
Danske Band of the Year	Alphabeat
Danish Female Artist of the Year	Medina
Danish Male Artist of the Year	Rasmus Seebach
Danish Newcomer of the Year	Medina
Danish Hit of the Year	Medina – "Vi to"
Danish Songwriter of the Year	Medina and Providers for Medina – Velkommen til Medina
Danish Producer of the Year	Providers for Medina – Velkommen til Medina
Foreign Album of the Year	Robyn – Body Talk Pt. 1
Foreign Hit of the Year	Stromae – "Alors On Danse"
Danish Jazz-album of the Year	Jakob Bro – Balledeering
Danish Vocaljazz Album of the Year	Sinne Eeg – Don't Be So Blue
New Danish Jazz-name of the Year	August Rosenbaum
Danish Crossover Jazz-album of the Year	Girls in Airports – Girls In Airports
Danish Folk Album of the Year	Falgren Busk Duo – Duet
New Danish Folk Name of the Year	Falgren Busk Duo
Danish Folk Musician/Vocalist of the Year	Nikolaj Busk
Danish Folk Composer of the Year	Bjarke Falgren for Falgren Busk Duo – Duet
Danish World Album of the Year	Afenginn – Bastard Etno
Danish World Track of the Year	Fatma Zidan – "Ana Kol"
Initiative of the Year	Rap Akademiet
Steppeulven for Hope of the Year	Marie Fisker
IFPI's Prize of Honor	Cæcilie Norby

== Danish Music Awards 2011 ==
The Winners

Category	Winner
Danish Album of the year	Agnes Obel – Philharmonics
Danish Songwriter of the year	Agnes Obel
Danish Band of the year	The William Blakes
Danish Female Artist of the year	Agnes Obel
Danish Male Artist of the year	Søren Huss
Danish Hit of the year	Fallulah – "Out of It" from The Black Cat Neighbourhood (album)
Danish Newcomer of the Year	Agnes Obel
Danish Live Name of the year	Turboweekend
Danish Producer of the year	Fridolin and Fallulah for Fallulah – "Out of It"
Internationale Album of the year	Adele – 21
Internationale Hit of the year	Rihanna – "Only Girl (In the World)"
Danish Rock-album of the year	The William Blakes – The Way of the Warrior
Danish Pop-album of the year	Agnes Obel – Philharmonics
Danish Urban-album of the year	L.O.C. – Libertiner from the Libertiner (album)
Danish Voxpop-album of the year	Alberte Winding – Fjerde til venstre
Danish Club-album of the year	Kato – Discolized 2.0
Danish Music Video of the year	L.O.C. – "Ung for evigt" from the Libertiner (album)
Audience Prize of the year	Nik & Jay
Danish Music Awards Prize of Honor	Nik & Jay

== Danish Music Awards 2012 ==
The Winners

Category	Winner
Danish Album of the Year	Malk de Koijn – Toback to the Fromtime
New Danish Name of the Year	Lukas Graham
Danish Band of the Year	When Saints Go Machine
Danish Songwriter of the Year	Rasmus Seebach, Nicolai Seebach and Ankerstjerne for Mer' end kærlighed
Danish Female Artist of the Year	Aura Dione
Danish Male Artist of the Year	Rasmus Seebach
Danish Hit of the Year	Aura Dione – "Geronimo"
Danish Live Name of the Year	Malk de Koijn
Audience Prize of the Year	Rasmus Seebach
New Artist (New Ideas/New Thinker) of the Year	Christopher
Danish Rock-album of the Year	Spleen United – School of Euphoria
Danish Pop-album of the Year	Rasmus Seebach – Mer' end kærlighed
Danish Urban-album of the Year	Malk de Koijn – Toback to the Fromtime
Danish Voxpop-album of the Year	Sebastian – Øjeblikkets mester
Danish Club-album of the Year	Shaka Loveless – "Tomgang"
Danish Producer of the Year	When Saints Go Machine for Konkylie
Danish Music Video of the Year	Shaka Loveless – "Tomgang" (Instructor: Amdi Niss-Espinoza)
Internationale Album of the Year	Lana Del Rey – Born to Die
Internationale Hit of the Year	Gotye – "Somebody That I Used to Know"
Danish Music Awards Prize of Honor	Thomas Helmig

Nominations

- Danish Album of the Year: Eaggerstunn – Armagedion, Lukas Graham – Lukas Graham, Malk De Koijn – Toback to the Fromtime, Oh Land – Oh Land, When Saints Go Machine – Konkylie.
- Danish Band of the Year: Lukas Graham, Malk De Koijn, When Saints Go Machine.
- Danish Female Artist of the Year: Aura Dione, Medina, Mette Lindberg (The Asteroids Galaxy Tour).
- Danish Male Artist of the Year: L.O.C., Lukas Graham, Rasmus Seebach.
- Danish Hit of the Year: Aura Dione – "Geronimo", Burhan G – "Jeg' i live", Medina – "Klokken 10", Rasmus Seebach – "I Mine Øjne", Svenstrup & Vendelboe feat. Nadia Malm – "Glemmer dig aldrig"
- Danish Newcomer of the Year: Eaggerstunn, Lukas Graham, Ulige Numre.
- Danish Songwriter of the Year: Aura Dione for Before the Dinosaurs, Jacob Bellens (I Got You On Tape) for Church of the Real, Lukas Graham & Backbone for Lukas Graham, Malk De Koijn for Toback to the Fromtime, Rasmus Seebach, Nicolai Seebach and Lars Ankerstjerne for Mer' end kærlighed.
- Danish Producer of the Year: Andreas Keilgaard (Fresh-I), Søren Schou (Pharfar) and Shaka Loveless for Shaka Loveless' Tomgang, Eaggerstunn for Armagedion, When Saints Go Machine for Konkylie.
- International Album of the Year: Black Keys – El Camino, Coldplay – Mylo Xyloto, Jack White – Blunderbuss, Jay-Z & Kanye West – Watch the Throne, Lana Del Rey – Born to Die.
- International Hit of the Year: Avicii – "Levels", Carly Rae Jepsen – "Call Me Maybe", Gotye – "Somebody That I Used to Know", Michel Teló – "Ai Se Eu Te Pego", Rihanna – "We Found Love".
- Danish Rock-album of the Year: D-A-D – Dic.Nii.Lan.Daft.Erd.Ark, Turboweekend – Fault Lines, Spleen United – School of Euphoria.
- Danish Pop-album of the Year: Aura Dione – Before the Dinosaurs, Lukas Graham – Lukas Graham, Rasmus Seebach – Mer' end kærlighed.
- Danish Urban-album of the Year: Eaggerstunn – Armagedion, L.O.C. – Prestige, Paranoia, Persona Vol. 1, Malk De Koijn – Toback to the Fromtime
- Danish Voxpop-album: Mike Andersen – Mike Andersen, Sanne Salomonsen – Tiden Brænder, Sebastian – Øjeblikkets Mester.
- Danish Club-album of the Year: Kasper Bjørke feat. Jacob Bellens – Lose Yourself to Jenny, Nabiha – Never Played the Bass, Shaka Loveless – Tomgang.
- Danish Live Name of the Year: D-A-D, Malk De Koijn, L.O.C.
- Danish Music Video of the Year: L.O.C. – "Langt Ude" (director: Mike Spooner), L.O.C. – "Noget Dumt" (director: Rasmus Laumann), Nabiha – "Never Played the Bass" (director: Patrick Killingbeck), Outlandish – "Warrior//Worrier" (director: Martin Skovbjerg /Sauna Cigar) and Shaka Loveless – "Tomgang" (director: Amdi Niss-Espinoza).
- Audience Prize of the Year: Aura Dione, Medina, Shaka Loveless, Malk De Koijn, D-A-D, Niklas, Lukas Graham, L.O.C., Kato, Rasmus Seebach, Tim Christensen and the Damn Crystals, Klumben and Raske Penge.

Performances

- Aura Dione – "In Love with the World"
- Stine Bramsen – "Love Sea" (from the album Express Non-Stop)
- Nabiha – "Mind the Gap"
- Shaka Loveless – "Tomgang" and "Ikke mere tid"
- Lukas Graham – "Better Than Yourself (Criminal Mind Pt. 2)"
- Nephew – "Hjertestater"
- Mads Langer – "Nu hvor du har brændt mig af" (from the album Vejen væk)
- Outlandish – "Stupid Man"
- Burhan G – "Midnat i Europa" (from the album 2)
- Medina – "Har du glemt" (For altid (album))
- EaggerStunn – "Kugledans"
- Klumben & Raske Penge – "Faxe Kondi"
- Marie Key – "Uopnåelig"
- Dúné – "Hell No!"

== Danish Music Awards 2013 ==
The Winners

Category	Winner
Danish Album of the Year	Marie Key – De Her Dage
New Danish Name of the Year	Quadron
Danish Band of the Year	Volbeat
Danish Songwriter of the Year	Marie Key, for De Her Dage
Danish Female Artist of the Year	Marie Key
Danish Male Artist of the Year	Shaka Loveless
Danish Hit of the Year	Marie Key – "Uden Forsvar"
Danish Live Name of the Year	Marie Key
Audience Prize of the Year	Mads Langer
New Artist (New Ideas/New Thinker) of the Year	Nik & Jay
Danish Rock-album of the Year	Volbeat – Outlaw Gentlemen & Shady Ladies
Danish Pop-album of the Year	Marie Key – De Her Dage
Danish Urban-album of the Year	Quadron – Avalanche
Danish Voxpop-album of the Year	Allan Olsen – Jøwt
Danish Club-album of the Year	Yepha – "Ik' Gør Det"
Danish Producer of the Year	Robin Hannibal for Quadron – Avalanche
Internationale Album of the Year	Rihanna – Unapologetic
Internationale Hit of the Year	Daft Punk – "Get Lucky"
Danish Music Awards Prize of Honor	Shu-Bi-Dua

== Danish Music Awards 2014 ==
The Winners

Category	Winner
Danish Album of the Year	MØ – No Mythologies To Follow
New Danish Name of the Year	MØ
Danish Band of the Year	Ukendt Kunstner
Danish Songwriter of the Year	Rasmus Seebach, Nicolai Seebach og Ankerstjerne for "Ingen Kan Love Dig I Morgen"
Danish Artist of the Year	MØ
Danish Hit of the Year	Medina – "Jalousi"
Danish Live Name of the Year	Spids Nøgenhat
Audience Prize of the Year	Christopher
New Artist (New Ideas/New Thinker) of the Year	Musikstarter – Nephew
Danish Rock-album of the Year	Spids Nøgenhat – Kommer Med Fred
Danish Pop-album of the Year	Christopher– Told You So
Danish Urban-album of the Year	S!vas – D.A.U.D.A
Danish Voxpop-album of the Year	Michael Falch – Sommeren Kom Ny Tilbage
Danish Club-album of the Year	Brandon Beal (feat. Christopher) – "Twerk It Like Miley"
Danish Producer of the Year	Hedegaard
Danish Music Video of the Year	MØ – "Walk This Way"
Internationale Album of the Year	Pharrell Williams – Girl
Internationale Hit of the Year	Pharrell Williams – "Happy"
Danish Music Awards Prize of Honor	D-A-D

== Danish Music Awards 2015 ==
The Winners

Category	Winner
Audience Prize of the Year	Lukas Graham
Danish Songwriter of the Year	Carl Emil Petersen - Grand Prix
Danish Artist of the Year	Lukas Graham
Danish Band of the Year	Suspekt
Danish Hit of the Year	Cisilia - "Vi to datid nu"
New Artist of the Year	Cisilia
Danish Live Name of the Year	Suspekt
Danish Urban-album of the Year	Suspekt
Danish Producer of the Year	Rune Rask
International Hit of the Year	Omi - "Cheerleader"
International Album of the Year	Kendrick Lamar - "To Pimp a Butterfly"
Danish Club-album of the Year	TooManyLeftHands - "Too Young To Die"
Danish Rock-album of the Year	Ulige Numre - "Grand Prix"
Danish Music Video of the Year	Xtra Naan - "Malk mig"
Danish Pop-album of the Year	Lukas Graham - "Lukas Graham"
Danish Music Awards Prize of Honor	Tim Christensen
Danish Solo Artist of the Year	Sivas

== Danish Music Awards 2017 ==
=== Winners ===
The winners
Category	Winner
Danish Release of the Year	Gilli feat. Kesi & Sivas – Rica
Danish Band of the Year	Scarlet Pleasure
Danish Solo Artist of the Year	Gilli
Danish Hit of the Year	Scarlet Pleasure – Deja Vu
New Danish Name of the Year	Noah Carter
Danish Song Writer of the Year	Gilli for among others 'Helwa', 'La Varrio' & 'Habibi Aiwa'
Danish Producer of the Year	Hennedub for among others Kesi's 'God Dag', 'Consigliere', 'Mamacita' og Gillis 'Habibi Aiwa', 'Helwa', 'La Varrio' og 'Rica'
International Name of the Year	Kendrick Lamar - Damn
International Hit of the Year	Ed Sheeran - Shape of You
Danish Live Name of the Year	Volbeat
Audience Prize of the Year	Rasmus Seebach
Danish Music Awards Prize of Honor	Sort Sol

=== Nominees ===
The Nominees
Category	Nominees
Danish Release of the Year	Gilli feat. KESI & Sivas – Rica KESI feat. Benny Jamz – Mamacita Scarlet Pleasure – Limbo Sort Sol – Stor Langsom Stjerne Suspekt – 100% Jesus
Danish Band of the Year	Molo Nik & Jay Scarlet Pleasure Sort Sol Suspekt
Danish Solo Artist of the Year	Gilli Gulddreng Jacob Dinesen KESI Lis Sørensen
Danish Hit of the Year	Gilli – Habibi Aiwa Gilli – Helwa Gilli feat. KESI & Sivas – Rica Martin Jensen – Solo Dance Scarlet Pleasure – Déjà vu
New Danish Name of the Year	Noah Carter NODE Off Bloom Skinz Soleima
Danish Song Writer of the Year	Gilli (for among others "Helwa", "La Varrio" og "Habibi Aiwa") Gulddreng (for among other "Nemt", "Ked Af Det", "Hva' Så", "Utro"og "Drikker For Lidt") Katinka Bjerregaard (for Katinka "Vi er Ikke Kønne Nok Til At Danse") Martin Jensen, Lene Dissing, Peter Bjørnskov og Mads Dyhrberg (for Martin Jensen "Solodance") Xander (for among others Xander "Indre By")
Danish Producer of the Year	Anders Trentemøller Hennedub Jens Ole McCoy Jonas Vestergaard & Rune Rask Kewan Pádre
International Name of the Year	Calvin Harris – Funk Wav Bounces Vol. 1 Ed Sheeran - Divide Frank Ocean – Blonde Kendrick Lamar – Damn Nick Cave & The Bad Seeds – Skeleton Tree
International Hit of the Year	Clean Bandit feat. Sean Paul & Anne-Marie – Rockabye DJ Snake feat. Justin Bieber – Let Me Love You Ed Sheeran – Shape of You James Arthur – Say You Won't Let Go Luis Fonsi feat. Daddy Yankee – Despacito
Danish Live Name of the Year	Jacob Dinesen Nik & Jay Suspekt Ukendt Kunstner Volbeat

=== DMA-Academy 2017 ===
==== Det Lille Akademi ("The Small Academy") ====
Appoints the nominees:

- Hanne Boel - artist
- Henrik Daldorph - Sony Music
- Konrad Jahn - Universal Music
- Mikkel Torsting - Warner Music
- Søren Krogh Thompsen - Playground Music

==== Det Store Akademi ("The Large Academy") ====
Appoints the winners by vote:

- Anne Sofie Jeramiassen - ArtPeople
- Jakob Sørensen - The Bank
- Jan-Erik Stig - Warner Music
- Karina Foss Fenn - Sony Music
- Lasse Lindorff - GL Music
- Louise Alenius - komponist
- Marie Key - artist
- Medina - artist
- Pelle Svindborg - YouSee Musik / Telmore Musik
- Peter Skovsted - PanAmericana
- Sira Berry - Spotify
- Thor Jensen - Apple Music
- Tobias Nielsen - Bauer Media
- Torben Ravn - Copenhagen Records
- Waqas Qadri - artist

== Danish music awards 2019 ==
category	winner
Danish Release of the Year	the minds of 99- solkongen
Danish Band of the Year	Benal
Danish Solo Artist of the Year	Kesi
Danish Hit of the Year	Love someone
New Danish Name of the Year	Clara
Danish Song Writer of the Year	Mø, for Forever neverland
Danish Producer of the Year	Nicki Pooyandeh
International Name of the Year	Billie elish
International Hit of the Year	Lady gaga &bradley cooper -"shallow"
Danish Live Name of the Year	Nik & Jay
Audience Prize of the Year	Lukas Graham
Danish Music Awards Prize of Honor	Lis sørensen
