= NorthSide Festival (Denmark) =

Music festival in Aarhus, Denmark

Coordinates: 56.1511°N 10.1756°E

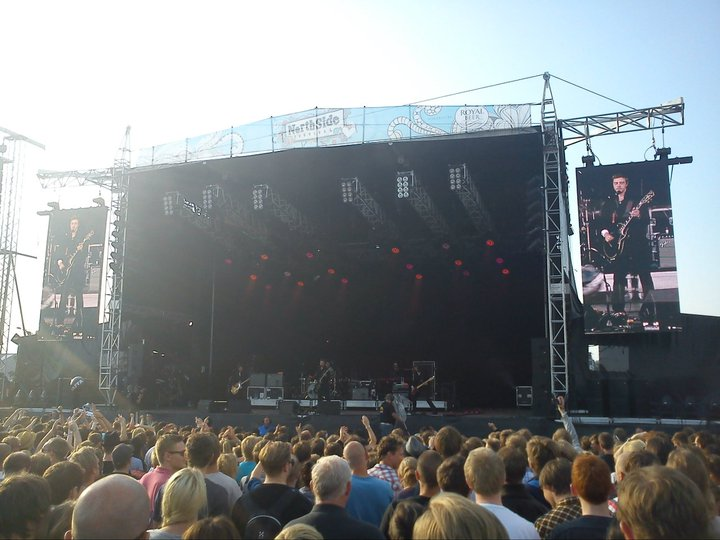
- NorthSide Festival 2011. Interpol concert.
- Genre: Rock, Alternative rock, Pop, Synthpop, Hip hop, Indie, Electronic music
- Dates: 6–8 June 2019
- Locations: Aarhus, Denmark
- Years active: 2010–present
- Founders: Brian Nielsen and Flemming Myllerup
- Website: www.northside.dk

NorthSide Festival, or simply NorthSide, is a three-day music festival held every year in June in Aarhus, Denmark. It has four stages with rotating artists and several sideshow events and happenings. The first festival commenced in 2010 and from 2011 to 2019, the festival has been held at Ådalen in Åbyhøj. The 2017 festival was attended by 40,000 people each day. In 2022, for the very first time, NorthSide took place in Eskelunden, right by Aarhus Å and in the backyard of the city.

The festival now goes by the name NorthSide to avoid confusion with the Northside Festival in Brooklyn. It is a privately owned festival, owned by Down The Drain Group, who also owns the Tinderbox music festival in Odense and is shareholder in other music business activities in Denmark.

Besides the musical profile and a goal of creating profit for its owners, NorthSide has a mission statement focused on innovation, sustainability, and customer involvement.

== History ==
NorthSide Festival was initiated by Danish promoter Brian Nielsen, who then approached German concert-company FKP Scorpio. This company is owned by the German businessman Folkert Koopmans, who also owns the Southside and Hurricane Festival and now also owns a part of NorthSide. The rest is owned partly by a holding-company under Flemming Myllerup and Brian Nielsen and partly by Beatbox Entertainment.

The festival launched in 2010 at Tangkrogen in Aarhus as a one-day event featuring five Danish acts (Nephew, Turboweekend, Mew, Selvmord, and Veto). In 2011 the festival moved to Ådalen in Åbyhøj and expanded into a two-day event, which was sold out. The second edition of the festival featured acts such as Band of Horses, Suede, White Lies, Interpol, and Elbow.

In 2013, the festival was expanded into a three-day event, which ran from 15 to 17 June. The event was completely sold out two weeks prior to the event selling 25,000 tickets in total.

As of 2018, Down The Drain Holding (part of Down The Drain Group with Brian Nielsen as CEO) owns NorthSide Festival along with other music events in Denmark. It is the biggest independent festival and concert organiser in the Nordic countries. Down The Drain Holding saw some financial difficulties in the late 2010s but in 2018, US based equity fund Orkila invested heavily in the company. In 2019, Down The Drain Group was acquired by Superstruct Entertainment.

== Sustainability ==
NorthSide has an ambition of becoming the most sustainably driven and environmentally conscious festival in the Nordic countries. Since 2015, the festival has developed reports in collaboration with local counselling company Worldperfect on their progress in this regard.

In 2017, the festival reached part of the ambitious sustainability goals, when all food, wine, champagne and coffee were organic products. All other products for sale was close to 100% organic origin as well. The sustainability also extends to green energy and waste control. Customers pays a deposit for plastic cups which is then refunded when the cups are returned. In this way 91% of sold plastic cups were returned for recycling in 2017. All in all, 78%, amounting to 210 tons of all waste, was sorted in sixteen categories and subsequently recycled. NorthSide has a goal of running on CO_{2}-neutral green energy exclusively by 2020 but in 2017, the festival used only 10% green energy (solar and wind).

== Line-up by year ==
2010: Nephew, Turboweekend, Mew, Selvmord, Veto.

2011: Band of Horses, Suede, White Lies, Interpol, Elbow, The Streets, Editors, The Naked & Famous, The Vaccines, Jamie Woon, Crystal Castles, Thomas Dybdahl, Tina Dickow, De Eneste To, Søren Huss, Fallulah, The Floor is Made of Lava, Turboweekend, The Rumour Said Fire, Veto, Boho Dancer, Asbjørn & The Strange Ears.

2012: The Stone Roses, Justice, Kasabian, Snow Patrol, Garbage, James Blake, Noel Gallagher's High Flying Birds, The xx, The Hives, The Kooks, Noah and the Whale, Eagles of Death Metal, Marina and the Diamonds, Emeli Sandé, The Gaslight Anthem, Bat for Lashes, Bombay Bicycle Club, Miles Kane, Little Dragon, Oh Land, Kashmir, Malk de Koijn, Turboweekend, When Saints Go Machine, Dúné, Choir of Young Believers, D-A-D, Lukas Graham, Suspekt, Freja Loeb, and The Asteroids Galaxy Tour.

2013: Arctic Monkeys, Phoenix, Keane, The Flaming Lips, Nephew, Trentemøller, Alt-J, Band of Horses, The Knife, Nick Cave & The Bad Seeds, Portishead, Kaizers Orchestra, When Saints Go Machine, Love Shop, Spleen United, Gogol Bordello, Fun., Ellie Goulding, Imagine Dragons, Tom Odell, Daughter, Everything Everything, Frightened Rabbit, Kashmir, MØ, The Eclectic Moniker, Kristina Renée, Peter Sommer, Rasmus Walter, Bikstok Røgsystem, Jagwar Ma, Biffy Clyro, Shaka Loveless, Kings of Convenience, Left Boy, Passenger, Deap Vally, Tegan and Sara, Fallulah, The William Blakes, and The Floor is Made of Lava.

2014: Ane Brun, Arcade Fire, A$AP Rocky, Baby in Vain, The Blue Van, Bombay Bicycle Club, The Brian Jonestown Massacre, Chorus Grant, Cold Specks, Donkey Roadshow & Special Guests, Flogging Molly, Franz Ferdinand, James Vincent McMorrow, Jurassic 5, Lana Del Rey, Lars H.U.G., Lucy Love, Lulu James, Mew, The Minds of 99, Mont Oliver, Mount Kimbie, The Mountains, MØ, Nabiha, The National, Oh Land, Nina Persson, Pixies, Quadron, Queens of the Stone Age, Reptile Youth, Rhye, Royal Blood, Röyksopp and Robyn Do It Again 2014, Rudimental, RY X, Turboweekend, White Lies, WhoMadeWho, Wild Beasts.

2015: Alt-J, Antony and the Johnsons, Ben Howard, Broken Twin, Calexico, Carl_Barât and The Jackals, De Eneste To, Death Cab for Cutie, Earl Sweatshirt, Emilie Nicolas, FKA Twigs, George Ezra, Go Go Berlin, Grace Jones, GusGus, Incubus, Interpol, Jack Garratt, John Grant, José González, Matthew E. White, MØ, Placebo, Rangleklods, Savages, Scarlet Pleasure, Seasick Steve, S!vas, Spids Nøgenhat, St. Paul and the Broken Bones, The Black Keys, The Jesus and Mary Chain, The Minds of 99, The Parov Stelar Band, Ulige Numre, Underworld, Wolf Alice, Wu-Tang Clan, Years & Years

2016: AV AV AV, Alex Vargas, Beach House, Beck, Bernhoft, Bloc Party, Blossoms, C Duncan, Caribou, The Chemical Brothers, Coasts, Damien Rice, Deftones, Den Sorte Skole, Digitalism, Duran Duran, Flume, Iggy Pop, Jake Bugg, Jamie xx, Jamie Lawson, Lukas Graham, Malk de Koijn, Marvelous Mosell, The Minds of 99, Phlake, Puscifer, Samm Henshaw, Scarlet Pleasure, Sigur Ros, Ukendt Kunstner, Unknown Mortal Orchestra, Velvet Volume, Wilco, Wolf Parade, Yeasayer, Yelawolf

2017: 2manydjs, Agnes Obel, Bastille, Bisse, Chinah, Folkeklubben, Frank Ocean, Helgi Jónsson, IAMJJ, James Blake, Lightwave Empire, Liss, Mando Diao, MØ, Off Bloom, Peter Sommer & Tiggerne, Phlake, Primus, Radiohead, Rasmus Walter, Richard Ashcroft, Ride, Run the Jewels, Saveus, Sort Sol, Suspekt, The 1975, The Afghan Whigs, The Kills, The Prodigy, Thomas Dybdahl, Thomas Helmig, Tina Dickow, Tom Odell, Veronica Maggio, When Saints Go Machine, Whomadewho, and Zirkus.

2018: Björk, Queens of the Stone Age, Beck, A Perfect Circle, Dizzy Mizz Lizzy, The National, C.V. Jørgensen, Deerhunter, Diplo, Father John Misty, Nik & Jay, Rhye, Tyler the Creator, Aurora, Cigarettes After Sex, Jimmy Eat World, Sleaford Mods, Thundercat, MC5 featuring special guests Matt Cameron and Kim Thayil of Soundgarden

2019: Tame Impala, Major Lazer, Bon Iver, Khalid, The Streets, Mark Ronson, Migos, New Order, Keane, Suspekt, The Minds of 99, Alice in Chains, Foals, Kaytranada, Phlake, Tove Lo, Benal, Gnags, Idles, L.O.C., Michael Kiwanuka, Nas, Saveus, The Blaze, First Aid Kit, Kurt Vile & The Violators, Peter Sommer, Cautious Clay, Hop Along, Masego, Pond, Alice Merton, Jada, Lydmor, Barselona, Bikstok Røgsystem, Georgia, Jonah Blacksmith, Novo Amor

2020: Cancelled due to COVID-19

2021: Cancelled due to COVID-19

2022: Alex Vargas, Andreas Odbjerg, Artigeardit, Asger Techau, Ashibah, Burhan G, Cheff Records, Clara, Coco O., Dopha, Drew Sycamore, FVN, Hans Philip, Jada, Jonah Blacksmith, Jung, Kashmir, Lewis Capaldi, Mekdes, Mew, MØ, Nathaniel Rateliff & The Night Sweats, Nick Cave & The Bad Seeds, RoseeLu, Saveus, Scarlet Pleasure, Spleen United, Suspekt, Tessa, The Avalanches, The Minds of 99, Thomas Helmig, Tom Misch, Undertekst.

ELECTRA: AmyElle, ARTBAT, Baime, Ben Böhmer, CamelPhat, Colyn, Cristoph, Denis Horvat, DJ Cemetary & DJ Poul Bones, Henri Matisse, HOSH, James Hype, Joris Voorn, Kris O’Neil, Kölsch, La La, Nora En Pure, Pete Tong, Prom Night.
