= List of songs about Copenhagen =

This list of songs about Copenhagen is a list of songs about Copenhagen, Denmark.

- Victor Cornelius and Carl Viggo Meincke - København, København.
- Kai Normann Andersen - Er København den samme som den var engang?
- Danny Kaye - Wonderful Copenhagen (1952)
- Håkan Hellström - Jag har varit i alla städer
- Elga Olga - Solitudevej (1953)
- Bent Fabricius Bjerre/Volmer Sørensen - Forelsket I København
- Cæsar - Storkespringvandet (1966)
- Keld & The Donkeys - ’Det var på Fred'riksberg (1967)
- Scott Walker - Copenhagen (1969)
- Gasolin' - Langebro (1971)
- Gasolin' - Se din by fra tårnets top (1972)
- Benny Holst - Københavner Sang (1974)
- Tom Waits - Tom Traubert's Blues (1976)
- Lone Kellermann - Humret på Nørrebro (1977)
- Peter Belli - Istedgade (1978)
- Lone Kellerman - Lyngbyvej (1979)
- Sods - Copenhagen (1979)
- Seebach Band - Copenhagen (1979)
- C. V. Jørgensen - Christiania Black Star (1979)
- Parkering forbudt.- Gråbrødretorv (1980)
- Van Morrison - Vanlose Stairway (1982)
- Kim Larsen - Østerbros Svømmehal (2008)
- Savage Rose - Stjerneskud ( Når Lysene tændes i Parken) (1989)
- Peter Belli - Peter Belli - København (Fra en DC-9) (1992)
- Dan Turèll and Halfdan E - Gennem Byen Sidste Gang (1993)
- Philippe Katerine - Copenhague (1996)
- Love Shop - Copenhagen Dreaming (1996)
- Kim Larsen - Jyllingevej (1996)
- Lex & Klatten - Københavnersangen (1998)
- Ginman/Jørgensen - Copenhagen Dream World (1999)
- Peter Sommer - Valby Bakke (2000)
- Peter Sommer - Københavns Energi (2000)
- Jokeren - Havnen (2003)
- Rasmus Nøhr - Nørrebro (2004)
- Peter Sommer - Valby Bakke (2004)
- Bael: Copenhagen Streetlight (2005)
- Magtens Korridorer - Vesterbro (2005)
- Thåström. Sönder Boulevard (2005)
- Magtens Korridorer - Nordhavn Station (2005)
- Magtens Korridorer - Picnic
- Joey Moe - Miss Copenhagen
- Jens Unmack - Sonder Boulevard (2007)
- Allan Olsen - På kanten af Vesterbro (2007)
- Szhirley - Gammel Kongevej (2008)
- Vetusta Morla - Copenhague (2008)
- Ligusterlogik - København (2008)
- Ligusterlogik - Østerbro (2008)
- Kim Larsen - Christianshavns Kanal (2008)
- Peter Belli - Enghave Park (2009)
- Tina Dico - Copenhagen (2010)
- Michael Falch - Over Vesterbros Torv (2010)
- Yjomas Helmig - Ned Ad Nørrebrogade (2010)
- Lucinda Williams - Copenhagen (2011)
- C. V. Jørgensen - Bellevue (2011)
- Ulige Numre - København (2011)
- Magtens Korridorer - Picnic (På Kastellet) (2012)
- Kaliber - Vest for København (2012)
- Ukendt Kunstner - København (2012)
- Mouritz/Hørslev Projektet - Lindevang St. (2013)
- Folkeklubben: Byens Kro (2013)
- Folkeklubben - Vesterbro Revisited (2013)
- Folkeklubben - Sønder Boulevard (2014)
- Christopher feat. Brandon Beal - CPH Girls
- Benny Andersons Orkester - En natt i köpenhamn (2016)
- Suspekt - Langt væk fra Vestegnen (2017)
- Tessa - Okay (2019)
- Rikke Thomsen - Åltins koldt i København (2019)
- Tessa & Orgi-E - Blæstegnen
- Fiona Sit - My Doppelgänger in Copenhagen (2021)
- Rune Rask & TOOMANYLEFTHANDS feat. Suspekt & Benjamin Hav - København (2024)
- Blæst - Disko i KBH (2023)
- Neil Brophy Band - Shorts and Shades (2003)
