= EaggerStunn =

Danish reggae duo

- Origin: Denmark
- Genres: Reggae / Dancehall / Roots / Dub and Hip Hop
- Years active: 2008-present
- Labels: Fake Diamond, A:larm / Universal Music
- Members: Eagger (Dwayne McFarlane) a.k.a. Eaggerman; Stunn (Kristoffer Sjelberg) a.k.a. Stunn Gunn

EaggerStunn sometimes also Eagger & Stunn is a Danish reggae duo with principal members being Dwayne McFarlane (also known as Eagger or Eaggerman) and Kristoffer Sjelberg (also known as Stunn or Stunn Gunn).

EagerStunn, a mix of Reggae / Dancehall / Roots / Dub and Hip Hop formation offering an alternative dancehall scene. Established in 2008, they are signed to Fake Diamond label. Initially they recorded numbers like "Morder dem" (full title "MorderMyrderMorderDem") and "Dub a Dub a.k.a. Soundclash" (2008). Their biggest hit has been the 2012 single "Kugledans" featuring Geolo G & Keith that was released on A:larm / Universal Music label.

The duo are currently working on a full-length debut album.

In 2017, the duo decided to put the band in the grave. They announced via Facebook that they were both initially working on their own music projects.

== Members ==
Prior to forming the duo, Eagger (Dwayne McFarlane) was a member of the Danish band Bikstok Røgsystem alongside Pharfar and Blæs Bukki. Active since 2005, the band had gained early recognition at the Danish Music Awards with being picked as "Best Danish Rap/Hip-Hop Act" and Pharfar winning the prize for "Best Danish producer".

As to Stunn Gunn (Kristoffer Sjelberg), he is a diverse artist who had been in bands Booty Cologne and took part in rap group Malk de Koijn live performances, and worked as a drummer for some time in Eagger's previous band Bikstok Røgsystem.

== Discography ==
=== Albums ===
Year	Album	Peak position	Certification
Year	Album	DEN	Certification
2012	Armagedion	2	

=== Singles ===
Year	Single	Peak position	Certification	Album
Year	Single	DEN	Certification	Album
2012	"Kugledans" (feat. Geolo G & Keith)	15		
