= Dagdrømmer =

Dagdrømmer may refer to:

- Dagdrømmer, a 2006 album by Nordstrøm
  - "Dagdrømmer", a song from the album Dagdrømmer by Nordstrøm
- Dagdrømmer, a 2024 album by Mille
