= Souvenirs (duo) =

Danish singing duo

- Origin: Hjeds, Suldrup, Denmark
- Genres: Pop
- Years active: 1993-present
- Members: Sofie Bonde; Nils Torp
- Website: www.souvenirs.dk

Souvenirs is a Danish pop duo consisting of Sofie Bonde (vocals, guitar) and her husband Nils Torp (bass, keyboards, guitar, violin, cello, accordion, vocals etc.). The group was formed in 1993 in Hjeds (now Rebild Municipality). The music for the band was written by Torp in collaboration with Johnny Voss. Souvenirs is best known for hits like "Han tog et nattog", "Jeg troede, du var hos Michael" and "Jeg hader Susanne".

Souvenirs won the Danish Music Awards in 2004 for Danish Top Album of the Year.

== Discography ==
=== Albums ===
Year	Album	Peak positions
Year	Album	DEN
1994	Souvenirs	
1996	Sommerfugl	
1998	Villa Danmark	
2000	De bedste souvenirs	
2001	Ude på landet	36
2004	Cirkus	–
2008	Rækkehuse på Mars	36
2010	Hinterland	36
2016	Tangopartner	–
