= Søs Fenger =

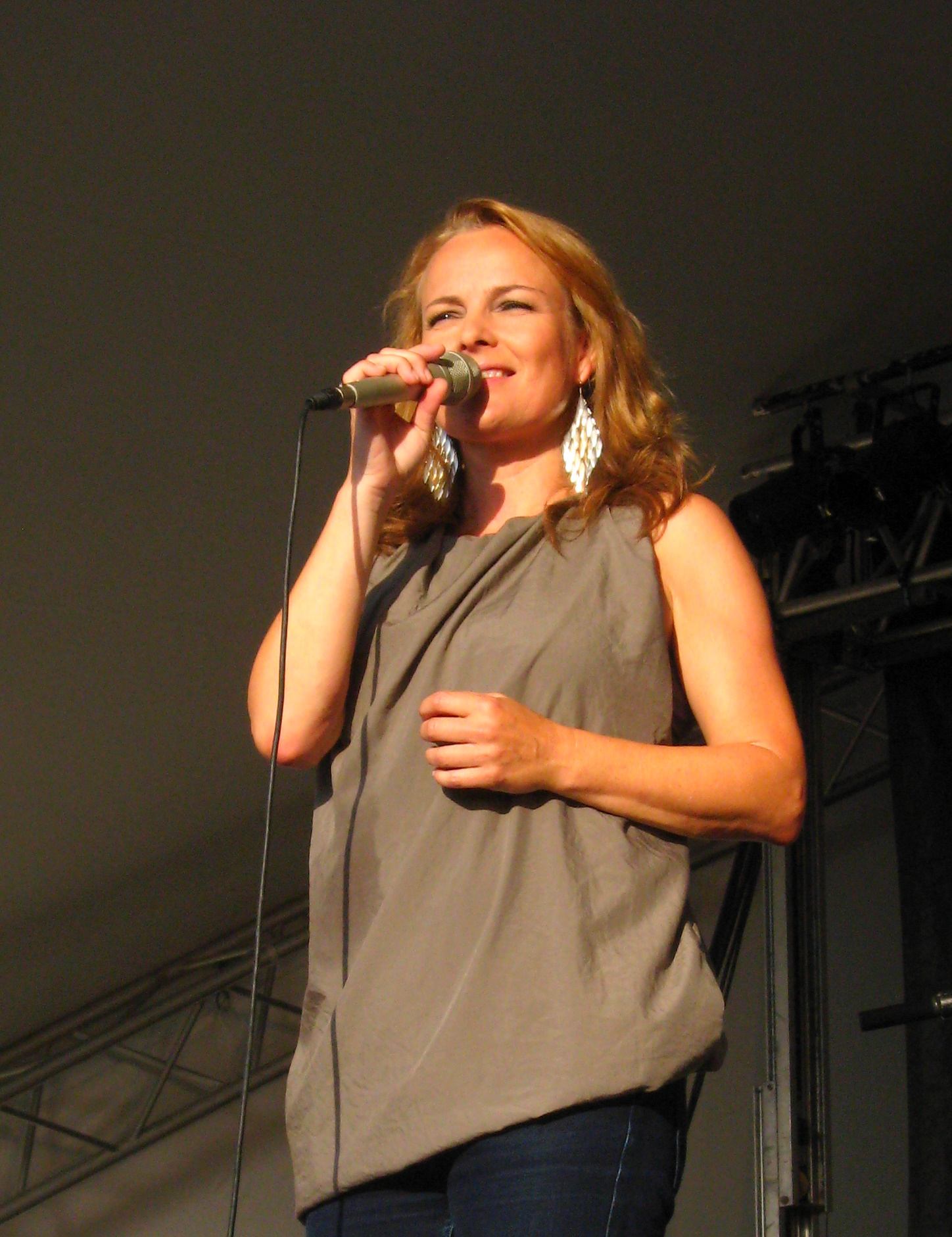
- Søs Fenger in Aalborg, July 2010

Background information
- Also known as: Søs Fenger
- Born: Charlotte Fenger; 2 December 1961 (age 64); Kongens Lyngby, Denmark
- Genre: Pop
- Occupations: Singer, songwriter
- Instrument: Singing
- Years active: 1980–present
- Website: sosfenger.dk

Charlotte Fenger (born 2 December 1961), known by the stage name Søs Fenger, is a Danish vocalist, guitarist, and songwriter. Since the mid 1980s she has been one of the most successful names in Danish music. She has released numerous albums, both as a solo artist and in collaboration with other groups.

== Career ==
Fenger was born in Kongens Lyngby, and began her musical career in 1980 with the band Sweet Intentions, which was led by the vocalist Nanna. She participated in the 1982 Danish Melodi Grand Prix as a choir singer on the song "Marie", which was performed by Jørgen Klubien and Carsten Elmer. In 1983, she made her breakthrough with the band News, and she performed alongside her brother, Lars Fenger, and his band Love Construction in 1985. Love Construction produced its album Caught in the act in 1988.

It wasn't until 1989 that Søs Fenger went solo with her first album Vinterdage, which sold over 150,000 copies. In 1991, Fenger collaborated with Niels Lan Doky and Niels-Henning Ørsted Pedersen to release her second album On Holiday which was composed entirely of Billie Holiday covers. The record quickly sold over 40,000 copies and was followed by a tour in Denmark and Sweden. In 1994, she released Et kys herfra, and toured europe with her new album. Her song "Sidste time" became the title melody of Regnar Grasten's film adaptation of Dennis Jürgensen's thriller Sidste time in 1995.

Her fourth album, Camouflage, released in 1996, marked a stylistic shift from vocal jazz to catchy pop music. The album revolved around lost love. The following year her compilation album, Gamle Flammer, was released and was her biggest commercial success yet. The album featured two new songs that had been recorded in Los Angeles. Her self-titled album, Søs, was released in 2000 and was an immediate success. The album's release was delayed after Fenger was involved in a traffic accident which fatally injured an elderly pedestrian.

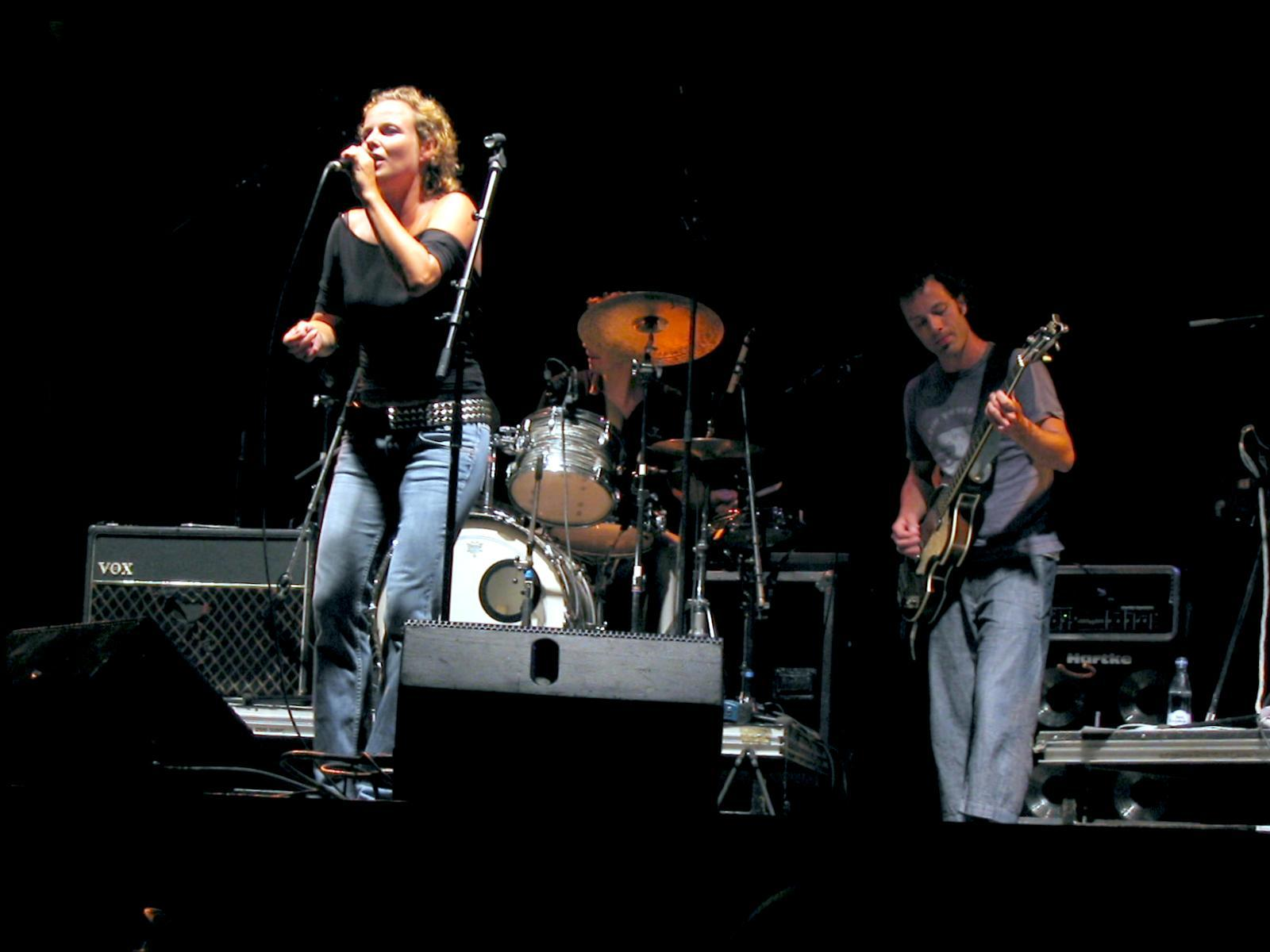
In Hjørring, 2003

In 2002, Beverly Way was released. Nøglen til paradis, released in 2004, was a cover album of Bent Fabricius Bjerre's works. In collaboration with the jazz musician Chris Minh Doky, Fenger produced Vuggeviser in 2007, which contained new interpretations of classic lullabies such as "Den lille Ole med Paraplyen" and "Mester Jakob". Fenger's second greatest-hits album, Stjernenat, was released in 2009 and contained acoustic versions of her most popular songs. In 2011 she was behind the title song for the Christmas calendar Ludvig & Julemanden. That same year she collaborated with, among others, Erann DD as a guest soloist on Gunnertoft Gospel Singer's album A Merry Little Christmas. In 2015 she released the album Gnister along with Troels Holdt and Lars Malm of the duo Nordstrøm. Vintermåne, released in 2017, is her first solely Christmas album.

Alongside her own career, Søs Fenger has appeared on a number of other artists' works, including: Mek Pek, Gnags, Henning Stærk, and Anne Linnet. Over the course of her career, Fenger has collaborated with other artists to produce a variety of songs in support of charity. In 1987, Søs collaborated with the band Moonjam to release "Ticket to Peace," a single which protested against nuclear weapons testing in Nevada. The single was followed by a tour in the United States. That same year, she contributed to the single "Du si'r, dit hjerte er hårdt som sten" in support of the youth crime prevention fund in Denmark. In 1988, Fenger contributed to another single, "Den jeg elsker, elsker jeg" in support of the danish AIDS-Fund. In support of the Dansk Refugee Council's collection for children in Sarajevo, Fenger contributed to the song "Gi' dem et håb" in 1995.

In 2011 and again in 2020, Fenger was contestant on the reality television series Toppen af Poppen.

== Personal life ==
In 1986, Fenger married Thomas Helmig at Egå Church with significant attention from the media. The pair divorced in 1989.

She later was in a relationship with Swedish guitarist Henrik Janson, though they have since separated. The couple have a son: August Fenger Janson, a music producer and DJ who performs under the name Eloq.

== Discography ==
- 1989: Vinterdage
- 1992: On Holiday
- 1994: Et kys herfra
- 1996: Camouflage
- 1997: Gamle flammer (compilation)
- 2000: Søs
- 2002: Beverly Way
- 2004: Nøglen til Paradis
- 2007: Vuggeviser
- 2009: Stjernenat
- 2011: Nogle gange er man så heldig, at man ikke når at tænke sig om...
- 2012: Stjernenat + Nogle gange er man så heldig, at man ikke når at tænke sig om... (compilation)
- 2015: Gnister (as Fenger//Nordstrøm)
- 2017: Vintermåne

== Awards and nominations ==
Year	Award	Category	Result	Ref.
1989	Danish Music Awards	Danish Hit of the Year	Won	
1990	Danish Music Awards	Danish Female Artist of the Year	Won	
1990	Danish Music Awards	Danish Release of the Year (Vinterdage)	Nominated	
1993	Danish Music Awards	Danish Female Artist of the Year	Nominated	
2003	Danish Music Awards	Danish Female Artist of the Year	Won	
2008	Danish Music Awards	Danish Children's Album of the Year	Nominated	
