= Ådalen Aarhus =

Event site in Aarhus, Denmark

Ådalen is a green area and event site in Åbyhøj, in Aarhus, Denmark. It is about 45 hectares (110 acres) in size and located along the Aarhus River, two kilometers from the inner city. Ådalen can be reached by Søren Frichs Vej from the nearby Ring 1 ring road or the outer Ring 2 ring road. The area is surrounded by a business park (with light industry) and a total of three allotment gardens.

== Activities ==
Ådalen has been used as event site for the NorthSide music festival since 2011, in agreement with Aarhus Municipality who owns the land. Outside of the festival period the area is primarily used for dog training grounds, association football, and recreational activities.

== Urban development ==
Ådalen is scheduled for urban development with new residential and business buildings as part of a larger project known as Det Nye Brokvarter (The New Faubourg). Det Nye Brokvarter is a modern faubourg (used in the urban planning context), that stretches from CeresByen and Godsbanen in the east to Åby public school and Åbyhøj sports stadium in the west.
