= Thomas Helmig =

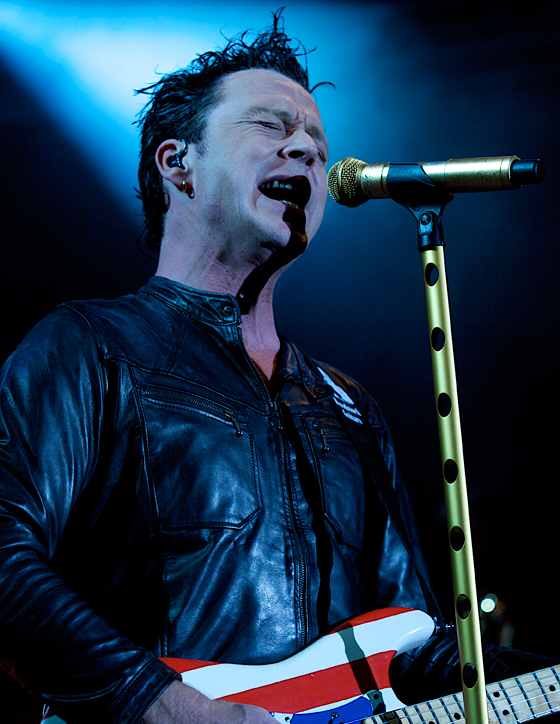
- Helmig at Skovdalen in Aalborg, Denmark in 2009

Background information
- Born: Thomas Helmig; 15 October 1964 (age 61); Egå, Denmark
- Genres: Pop rock, soul, blues
- Years active: 1980–present
- Labels: Genlyd, Sony Music
- Website: http://www.thomashelmig.dk

Thomas Helmig (born 15 October 1964) is a Danish rock singer and musician, and has been one of the most popular singers in Denmark since the middle of the 1980s.

== Biography ==
Thomas Helmig was born and grew up in Egå, a suburb of Aarhus, where his father was a doctor. His parents divorced when he was quite young. To escape from the feelings associated with his parents' divorce, Thomas took refuge in music, most notably he spent much time teaching himself to play the piano. At the age of 10, inspired by the Danish Band Gasolin, popular in the 70's, Thomas formed his first band and named it Heavy Oil. The following years he also learned to play the guitar and drums.

He entered the gymnasium but, with his parents' approval, he left during the first year to pursue his musical interests. To this end, he went to the United States as a high school exchange student. It was here that he first discovered Motown, playing with local soul musicians in Detroit.

Upon his return to Denmark in 1981, he joined an Aarhus-band called Kaksi Kuggas Band, with which he gigged in a number of local venues. He had become part of the rather narrow local music scene. By 1983 he became the lead singer for a band called Elevatordrengene (The Elevator Boys). They enjoyed a measure of success, touring the country for the next two years.

=== Breakthrough ===
In 1985 Helmig was invited to contribute to the Danish Africa Aid song Afrika, leading to his discovery by the record company Genlyd who subsequently produced his first self-titled solo album, Thomas, which became a huge Danish success and for which he also received considerable critical acclaim. He was especially praised for his empathic expression, notable because of his relative youth. He married another popular Danish singer, Søs Fenger, that same year.

In 1986 the album 2 was released. By now Helmig had formed his band, Thomas Helmig Band, which included some of the musicians from Elevatordrengene. The third album, Kære maskine ("Dear Machine"), was more rocking than the first two, while the following one Vejen væk (The Path Away), released in 1988, was much gloomier, reflecting his turbulent split from Fenger. The album became his greatest success to date, selling more than 160,000 copies. It features hits such as Nu hvor du har brændt mig af ("Now That You've Dumped Me") and Det er mig der står herude og banker på ("It's Me Out Here, Knocking"). Although divorced, he recorded a few duets with Søs Fenger, one of which, Den jeg elsker, elsker jeg ("The one I love, I love"), released in support of the Danish AIDS-foundation became a huge commercial success.

This period in his life also marked a turn in his musical style as he returned to his soul and Motown roots, inspired by Marvin Gaye. His next album "Say When" became the first he recorded in English. This change opened the prospect of promoting Helmig abroad. Singing in English in no way diminished his popularity in Denmark, and he had another huge hit with the song Stupid Man from the 1994-album of the same name, which also included the hit, Gotta Get Away From You. This album sold 250,000 copies.

Throughout the 1990s, Helmig attempted to make a name for himself abroad, but met with little success. However, he managed to maintain his position at the absolute top in Denmark for more than 20 years. He writes nearly all his own songs and he contributes prolifically as a songwriter to other artists like Søs Fenger, Hanne Boel, Sanne Salomonsen, TV-2, Malurt and many others. Additionally, he has produced many recordings for different artists.

He is the Danish pop musician with the largest collection of Danish Music Awards, including several "Singer of the Year", "Hit of the Year" and "Album of the Year". In 2012 he was awarded the Danish Music Awards Prize of Honor.

Saint Hans square in Nørrebro, Copenhagen has been unofficially dubbed "Thomas Helmig's Square" in honor of the large population of young Aarhusian people residing in the vicinity.

== Private life ==
Thomas Helmig has been married three times:

- 1985–1988: Singer Søs Fenger
- 1995–1997: Model Heidi Andersen
- 2000–2013; 2013–present: Renée Toft Simonsen, former model, psychologist and writer

== Discography ==
=== Albums ===
Studio albums

- Thomas (1985)
- 2 (1986)
- Kære Maskine (1987)
- Vejen Væk (1988)
- Løvens Hjerte (1990)
- Rhythm (1992)
- Say When (1993)
- Stupid Man (1994)
- Groovy Day (1996)
- Dream (1999)

Year	Album	Peak positions	Certification
Year	Album	DEN	Certification
2001	IsItYouIsItMe	1	
2004	El Camino	1	
2006	Helmig Herfra	1	
2006	Tommy Boy	1	
2013	KH Helmig	1	Gold
2018	Takker	2	
2024	Sortedam	1	

Compilation albums

Year	Album	Peak positions	Album
Year	Album	DEN	Album
1997	Årene Går - De Største af de Første		Greatest Hits (Danish-language songs)
2001	Wanted	4	Greatest Hits (English-language songs)
2006	Den danske boks		Greatest Hits box (Danish-language songs)
2009	Den engelske boks		Greatest Hits box (English-language songs)
2010	Past Forward	1	Ultimate Best of released on a 3-CD set
2025	Helmig Hits 1	7	

=== Singles ===
Year	Single	Peak positions	Album
Year	Single	DEN	Album
2009	"100 dage" (featuring Medina)	1	
2013	"Så lover jeg"	9	
2013	"Evigt?"	18	
2014	"Hun kommer igen"	20	
2014	"Når sneen falder" (with Søs Fenger)	21	
2018	"Hele Danmark op at stå"	20	
2022	"Stupid Man" (Mike Lowrey featuring Gobs and Thomas Helmig)	5	
2026	"Jeg ka' ik' mærke noget" (Christopher featuring Thomas Helmig)	5	
