= Over stok og sten =

Debut album by Bikstok Røgsystem

Studio album by Bikstok Røgsystem
- Released: February 7, 2005
- Length: 59:53
- Label: Copenhagen

Over stok og sten (lit. "over fence and stone," the Danish version of a saying equivalent to "like the clappers", from German "Über Stock und Stein") is the debut album by the Danish dancehall act Bikstok Røgsystem. It contains 16 tracks with a total running time of 59:53.

It was released in February 2005 under the "Copenhagen Records" label, received very favourable reviews, and entered the Danish album chart as number one in February and made Gold by June 2005.

== Track listing ==
1. "DK's Koner" (Women/Wives of Denmark) – 3:58 Music Video
2. "Cigar" [ft. Natasja Saad] (Cigar) – 3:29 Music Video
3. "Røglude" (Smokelude, play on the word "interlude") – 0:19
4. "Penge På Græs" (Money on Grass, "grass" referring to marijuana) – 3:55
5. "Tvebak" (Scone) – 0:21
6. "Tjikkah" ("Chikkah" – a nonsense word) – 2:39
7. "Radio" (Radio) – 3:13
8. "Alle Folk" [ft. Cornstick (All the People/Every man) – 0:55
9. "Unger" (Kids) – 3:06
10. "Fabrik" (Factory, the lyrics play on mainstream American hiphop lyrics containing the words "Work it, work it" as a sexual reference) – 3:38 Music Video
11. "Nøgne Mænd" (Naked Men) – 3:48
12. "3 Stks Tøj" (Three pieces of Clothes) – 4:17
13. "Krigsminister" (Minister of War) – 0:52
14. "Græder For Dem" (Crying for Them) – 3:01
15. "PawPaw" (Paoo Paoo, onomatopoeic words referring to the sounds of a gunshot) – 4:31
16. "Dukkemand" (Doll Man, referring to Voodoo dolls) – 17:54

The track Dukkemand is not actually 18 minutes long, but contains a long pause and a remix of Cigar towards the ending.
