= Den Gale Pose =

Danish hip hop group

- Origin: Copenhagen, Denmark
- Genres: Hip hop; Rap
- Years active: 1991-2002, 2011-present
- Labels: 5 Svin Records; Warner Music Denmark
- Members: Jesper Dahl (Jokeren); Nicholas Kvaran
- Past members: Blæs Bukki; Rasmus Berg

Den Gale Pose (DGP) is a Danish hip hop group, which started in the late 1980s and became successful in the late 1990s. The group was originally formed by Jesper Dahl ("Jokeren"), Nicholas Kvaran ("Coldhands"), Rasmus Berg ("B"), and Lasse Bavngaard ("Blæs Bukki").

== History ==
From 1992 until 1995 the group performed in Los Angeles under the name Madness 4 Real, where they worked as freelance producers for Solid Productions. The manager of Solid Productions, Carsten Willer, swindled the group and they made no financial gains during their stay in California. They produced songs for names such as Eazy-E, MC Ren, Rakim, Ice Cube, MC Clemens, and Outlandish. During their stay in the United States, they released 33 tracks in total, including four remixes on various records. Several of these releases have received American gold, platinum, and double platinum awards.

Lasse Bavngaard, who performs under the stage name Blæs Bukki, left Madness 4 Real to join Malk de Koijn. The group returned to Denmark in 1996 under the name Den Gale Pose. Their first album, Mod Rov, was released that same year.

In 1998 they released the album Sådan Er Reglerne, which sold over 38,000 copies. The album contained the track "Spændt Op Til Lir," which contained a sample from the song "Music and Lights" by Imagination. Though the group informed Warner Music Group that they had sampled from the song, they did not get it cleared with the record label, and the group has never made money on their song because of it. Three years later, in 2001 their third album Definitionen af en stodder was released.

In 2002 the group stopped working together. Jesper Dahl emerged as a solo artist performing under the name Jokeren.

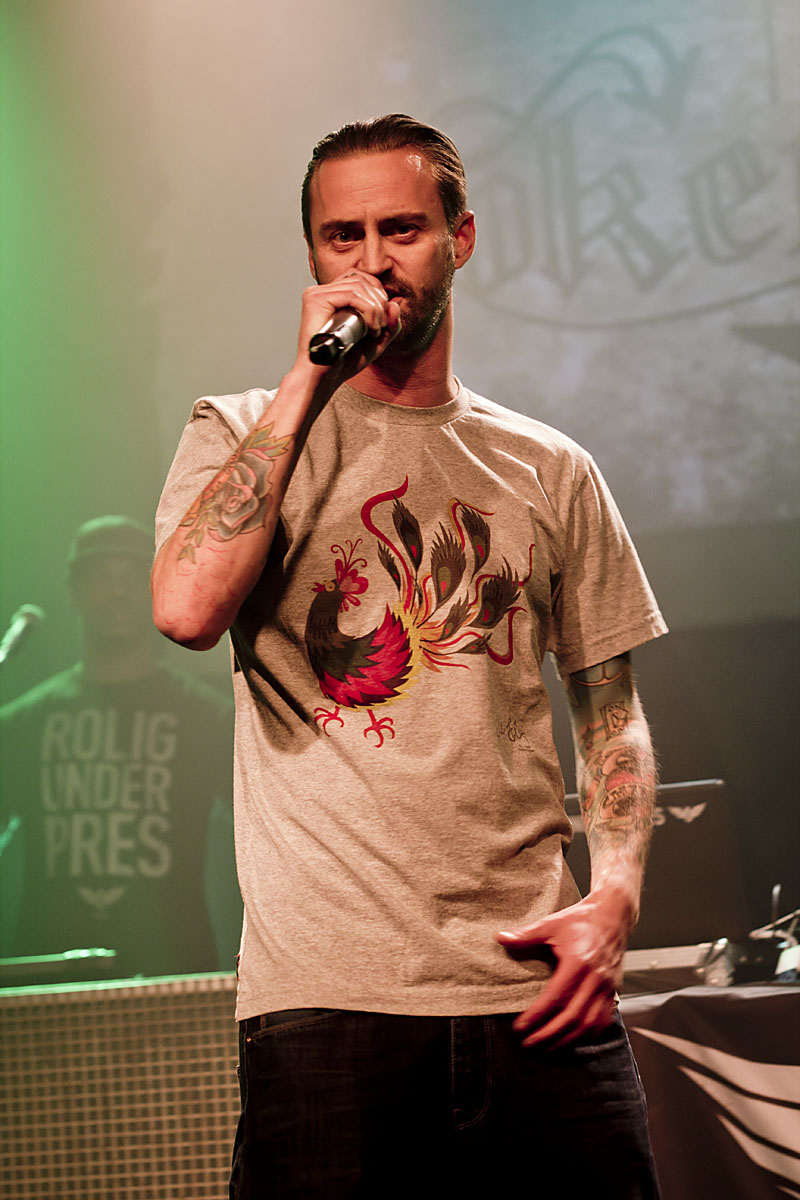
Jesper Dahl (Jokeren), February 2013

On March 3, 2011, Den Gale Pose announced that the group had gotten back together again on Go' Morgen Danmark. They gave a performance at Copenhagen Central Station in collaboration with the vocalist Szhirley.

Rasmus Berg, also known as Rasmus B, died November 6, 2018, from cancer. The two remaining members of the group, Jesper Dahl and Nicholas Kvaran, released the song "Indtil vi ses igen" as a tribute. It was the first time the group had released new music since they had reunited in 2011.

== Discography ==
=== Albums ===
- Flere Ho's (1996, EP)
- Mod Rov (1996)
- Sådan Er Reglerne (1998)
- Definitionen af en stodder (2001)
- Lir & Leftovers (2005, compilation)

=== Singles ===
- "Den Dræbende Joke" (1998)
- "Spændt Op Til Lir" (1998)
- "Dommedag nu!" (1999)
- "Bonnie & Clyde" (1998)
- "D.G.Players" (2001)
- "Indtil vi ses igen" (2018)
