= Nordstrøm (band) =

Danish electronic-pop band

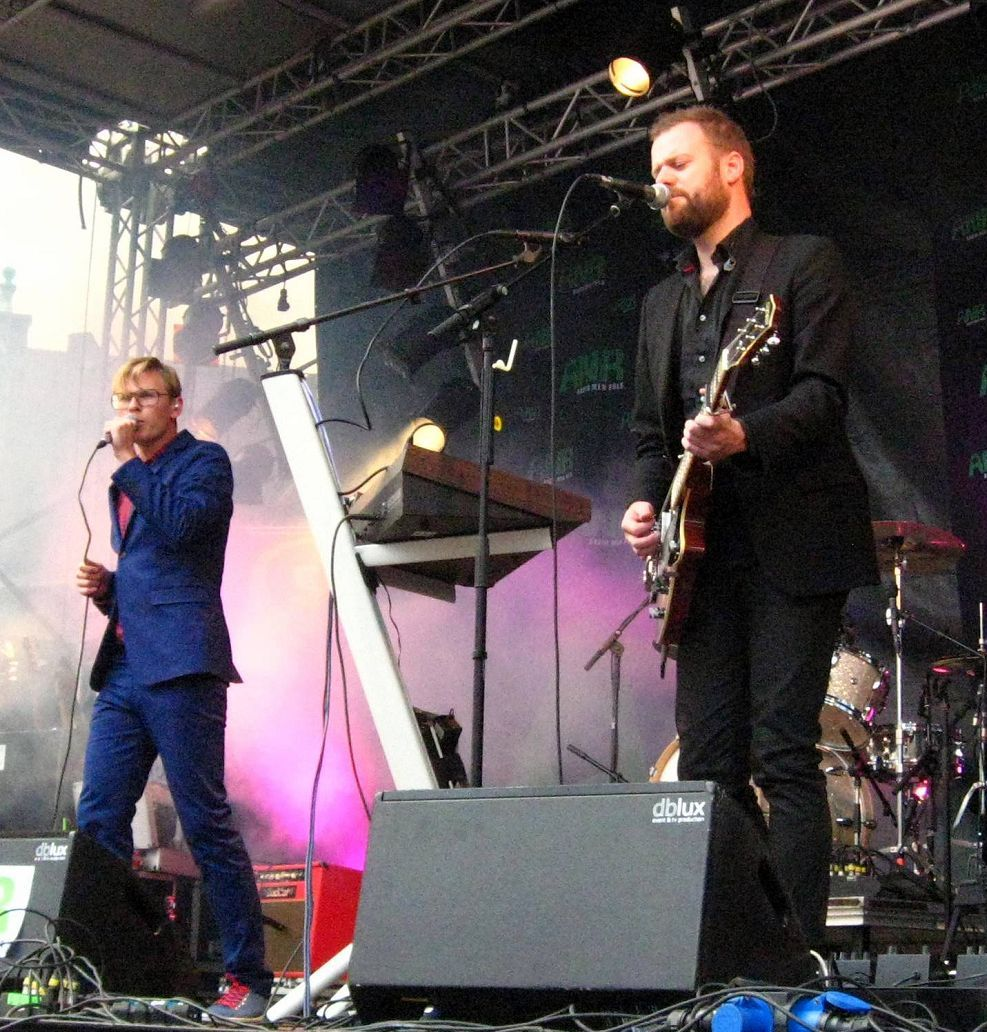
- Nordstrøm in 2010

Background information
- Origin: Copenhagen, Denmark
- Genres: Electropop
- Years active: 2004-present
- Members: Troels Holdt and Lars Malm
- Website: https://www.facebook.com/nordstromdk

Nordstrøm is a Danish electronic-pop duo formed in 2004 in Copenhagen. The group consists of Troels Holdt and Lars Malm, who had been friends for more than 10 years before starting the group.

The group's name is a compound word of the Danish words nord and strøm, meaning north-energy. According to Holdt and Malm, the name was chosen with the idea that electronic music comes from the northern sky, and that electricity creates life.

== History ==
Though Nordstrøm produces electronic pop, Malm and Holdt's friendship and collaboration were sparked by the Hank Williams classic "There's A Tear In My Beer". Both artists share a love for country classics, though the genre's influence on their music is not obvious. Malm and Holdt say that they draw inspiration for their songs from everyday life.

Before forming Nordstrøm, Malm and Holdt played in a number of smaller bands. Though they managed to tour the Balkans, they eventually dropped their other projects in favor of Nordstrøm.

Nordstrøm debuted in 2006 with their single "Berlin," which was released by EMI. "Berlin" was chosen as P3's inevitable song of the week and was the radio station's most played song in 2006. The song received a gold certificate in August 2006, and, by April 2008, had sold approx. 12,000 copies. The single was a precursor to the album Dagdrømmer, which was released in August 2006. The album also received a gold certificate after selling 15,000 copies.

Nordstrøm has played concerts at a variety of Danish music festivals, including: the Spot Festival in Aarhus, Vega, Roskilde Festival, and the Plænen festival at Tivoli.

In 2009, the duo collaborated with Lise Cabble to write and produce the song "Big Bang Baby", which was performed by Claus Christensen at the 2009 Dansk Melodi Grand Prix. Performing under the name Fenger//Nordstrøm, the duo collaborated with Søs Fenger to produce the album "Gnister" in 2015.

== Discography ==
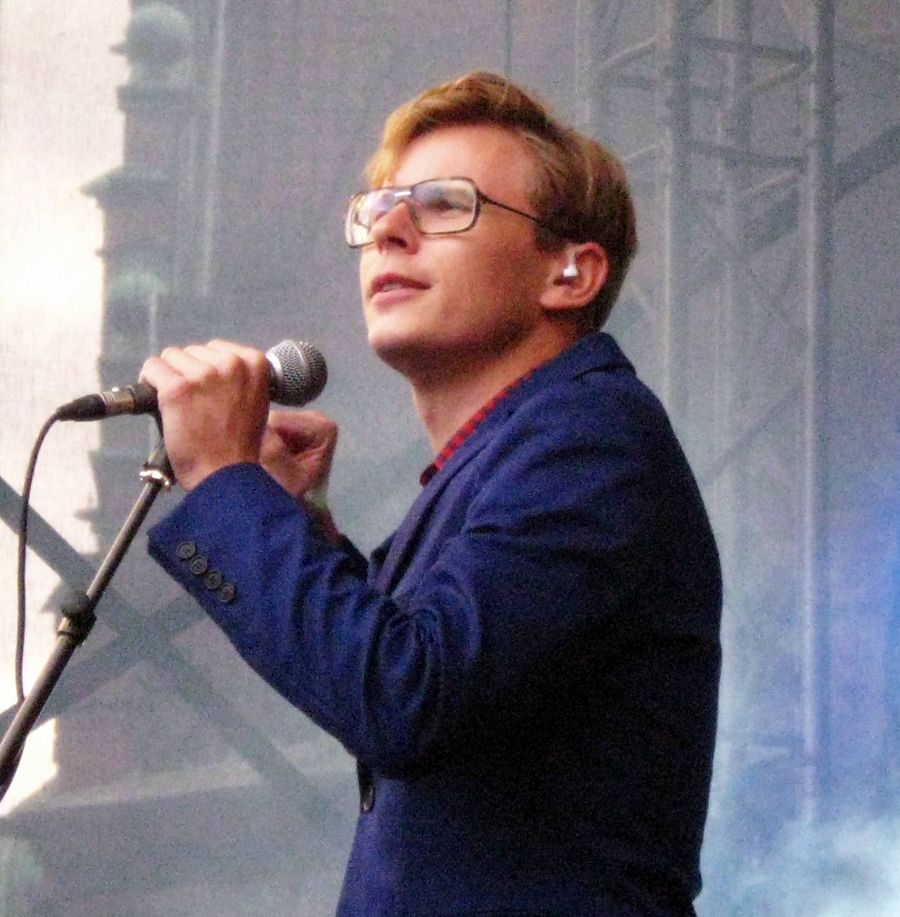
Lars Malm

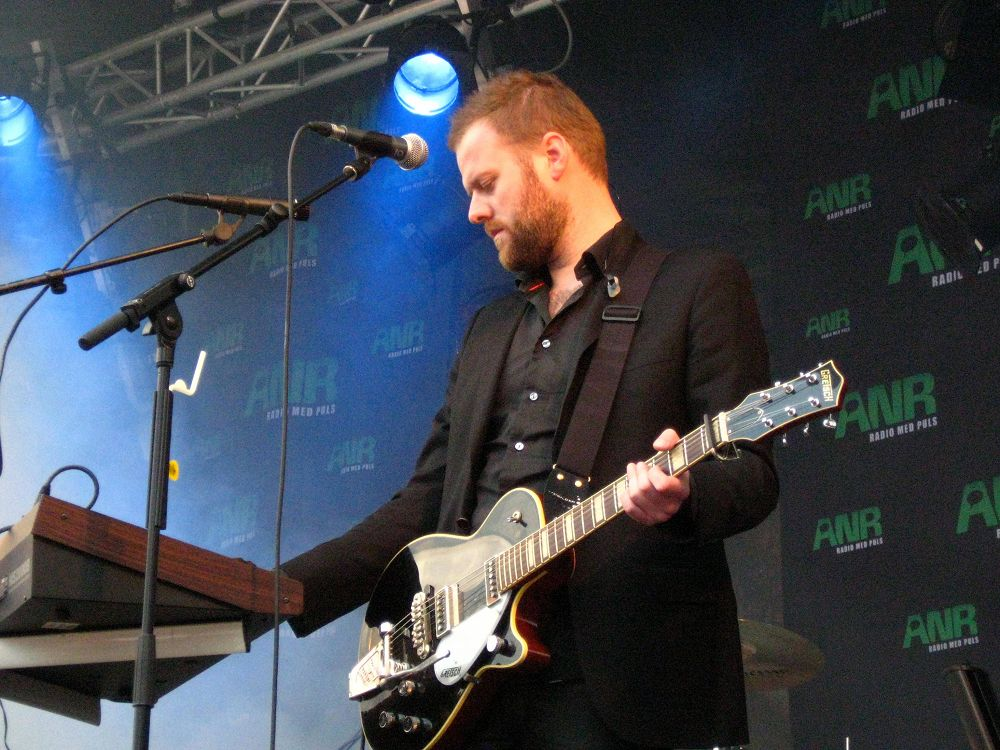
Troels Holdt

=== Dagdrømmer (2006) ===
- Stereo
- Berlin
- Du Og Jeg
- Foden Indenfor
- Spil For Galleriet
- Inkonsekvent
- Gi’ Besked
- Velsignede Tøs
- Natteravn
- Dagdrømmer
- Smil Du’ På
- Rotation

=== Endnu En (2008) ===
- Perfekt
- Endnu En
- Hvem Hvad Hvor
- Lyden Af Dit Smil
- Hun Sidder Her
- Bonnie & Clyde
- OK
- Business Class
- Lagt På Is
- For Himlens Skyld
- Mig Og Min Vagt
- Ro På

=== Alt På Plads (2010) ===
- Respirator
- Januar
- Alt På Plads
- En Sommer Der Bli'r
- En Sommer Der Bli'r, Pt. 2
- Sang Som Ingen Hører
- Ny Start
- Lykkeligt Glemt
- Johnny
- Samlebånd
- Kapitulation
- Tanken Tom

=== Singles ===
- Berlin (May 2006)
- Gi besked (August 2006)
- Sensommersol (September 2006, non album track)
- Du og jeg (December 2006)
- Spil for galleriet (March 2007)
- Endnu En (March 2008)
- Lyden af dit smil (June 2008)
- Danmark, det er jul (December 2008)
- Perfekt (January 2009)
- Januar (January 2010)
- Johnny (Maj 2010)
- Respirator (October 2010)
- Sort Mercedes (April 2011)
