= Tue West =

Danish composer and musician

Tue West (born 1977) is a Danish composer and musician. He released six solo albums in Danish and one English album with the trio "Jaruni, Moura and Wesko"

== Albums ==
- 2003: Tue West (Universal)
- 2005: Meldingen kommer (Universal)
- 2008: Vi er nået hertil (Universal)
- 2010: Lige ved og næsten (EMI)
- 2011: Ikke regulere mere (VME)
- 2016: Der er ingen der venter på os (Target)
- 2021: Frihed Til At Være En Fange
- 2023: Sange ud af evigheden

== See also ==
- List of Danish composers
