= Spids Nøgenhat =

Rock band

- Origin: Copenhagen, Denmark
- Genres: Psychedelic rock, folk rock
- Labels: Orpheus Records, Bad Afro
- Members: Uffe 'Aramis' Lorenzen; Morten 'Aron' Larsen; Anders Grøn; Anders Skjødt; Henrik 'Hobitten' Klitstrøm
- Past members: Ralph A. Rjeiley

Spids Nøgenhat is a psychedelic rock band from Copenhagen, Denmark, fronted by Uffe Lorenzen (alias Lorenzo Woodrose), known from Baby Woodrose. 'Spids Nøgenhat' is the Danish name for liberty cap (psilocybe semilanceata), a psychedelic mushroom commonly found in Denmark. The lineup is identical to that of the psychedelic group Dragontears, which also shares members of Baby Woodrose.

The band released their debut album, En mærkelig kop te (A Strange Cup of Tea) in 2001, but was largely unknown until a national breakthrough in 2011, following a late-night performance at Roskilde Festival, which became one of the most talked about shows that year. Hours after the concert, into the early morning, people chanted the words from the chorus of the last song, "Er vi de sidste her på jorden?". A live LP of the show, titled De sidste her på jorden, was released the following year. Spids Nøgenhat's second album, Kommer med fred (2013), received considerable national airplay in Denmark and the LP charted on the top-20 sales list.

In 2014 the group was awarded 'Live act of the year' and 'Danish rock release of the year' at the annual Danish Music Awards. In 2015 they were awarded 'Band of the year' and 'Live act of the year' at the Danish music critics' award show, Steppeulven.

A book titled Mere Lys – Historien om Spids Nøgenhat (More Light – The Story of Spids Nøgenhat) by Lars Krogh and Thomas Løppenthin was published in 2015 to critical acclaim. The book tells the story about the band's perhaps unlikely rise to fame and the background for the music and musicians in the band.

Also in 2015 a documentary, Born to Lose, about Uffe Lorenzen premiered, prominently featuring Spids Nøgenhat live and in the studio, during the recording of Kommer med fred. Born to Lose was shown at movie theatres all over Denmark and was well received among critics.

In the film, Lorenzen explains that a major reason for Spids Nøgenhats revival and particularly the decision to do another album, was due to sound engineer, booker and close friend, Ralph A. Rjeiley. Rjeiley was known as a driving force for psychedelia and stoner rock in Copenhagen, from the early 1990s and into the 2000s, and besides from working with Spids Nøgenhat, he was one of their biggest fans. After recording En mærkelig kop te—an album that hardly anyone noticed at its release, but later gained cult status—the band slowed down, but he still kept pushing them to do one more. Ralph A. Rjeiley died of testicular cancer in 2012.

Spids Nøgenhat has recorded and performed covers of Danish "golden age" rock by artists such as Hans Vinding, Young Flowers, Tømrerclaus and Røde Mor. Hans Vindings Den gennemsigtige mand, originally recorded for his group Hyldemor's album, Glem det hele (1978), has become one of the highly praised songs on Spids Nøgenhat's repertoire. In 2013, Glem det hele was reissued.

Spids Nøgenhat is currently in hiatus again, while Uffe Lorenzen focuses on his 2017 solo release, Galmandsværk.

== Discography ==
=== Albums ===
- 2001, En Mærkelig Kop Te (Orpheus Records)
- 2012, De Sidste Her På Jorden - Live Fra Roskilde Festivalen 2011 (Bad Afro)
- 2013, Kommer Med Fred (Bad Afro)

=== Singles ===
- 2001, "Alrune Rod / En Drøm" (Orpheus Records)
- 2013, "Lolland Falster" (Bad Afro)
