= Dúné =

Danish rock band

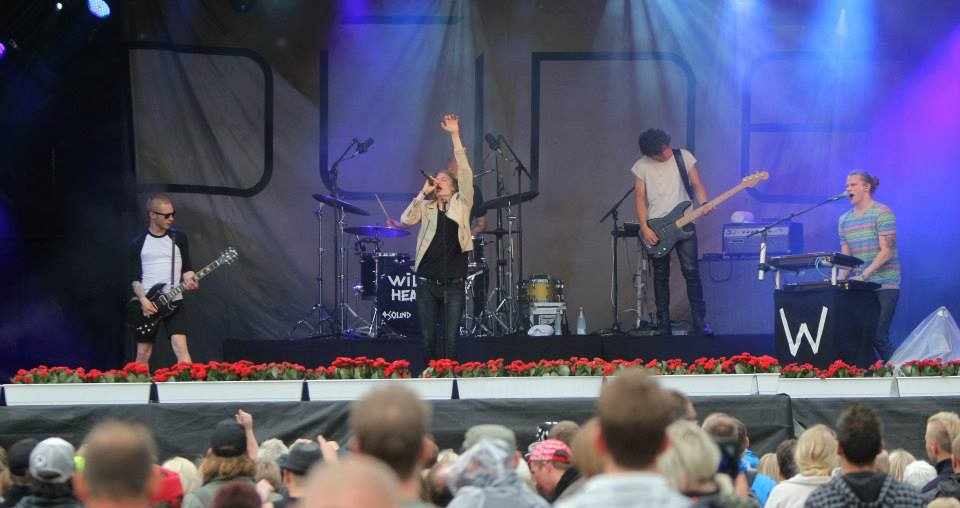
- Dúné in 2013

Background information
- Origin: Skive, Denmark
- Genres: Indie rock; post-punk revival; electronic rock; new wave; alternative dance; electropop
- Years active: 2001–2018
- Labels: Universal; New Gang of Robots; Iceberg
- Members: Mattias Kolstrup; Ole Bjórn; Piotrek Wasilewski
- Past members: Simon Troelsgaard; Malte Aarup-Sørensen; Cecilie Dyrberg; Danny Jungslun
- Website: dunesite.com

Dúné [Dew-nay] were a Danish rock band from Skive. At their split-up in 2018 the band consisted of Mattias Kolstrup (lead vocalist), Piotrek Wasilewski (bass, keyboards, backing vocals), and Ole Bjórn (keyboards, backing vocals, production). Their style was comparable to British and American electronic rock and resembles elements of 1980s pop music and 1970s post-punk blend with a distinct and modern Scandinavian touch. The band was best known for their entertaining and energetic live performances.

The band released four studio albums: We Are In There You Are Out Here (2007), Enter Metropolis (2009),Wild Hearts (2013) and Delta (2016) and toured extensively around the world and supported acts like Muse, Foo Fighters, Fall Out Boy, Panic at the Disco, and the German group Die Ärzte around Europe.

Dúné's won a number of music prices including three Danish Music Awards (Best Group, Best Rock Album & Best Newcomer), the P3 Gold Prize, the 2008 European Border Breaking Award (for best selling debut album outside of Denmark), plus various other awards. In 2008, We Are In There You Are Out Here was voted Album of the Year (2007) by the readers of Soundvenue and "Dry Lips" was voted the best Danish pop song of the last 20 years by the readers of PopLick.

== History ==
=== 2001–2005: Formation and building a reputation ===
The foundation of what would become Dúné was founded in 2001 by elementary school classmates Mattias Kolstrup (vocals), Malte Aarup-Sørensen (drums) and Simon Troelsgaard (guitar) in Skive, Denmark. After a couple of shifting band names and line up's at a handful of local gigs the three friends were permanently joined by classmate Cecilie Dyrberg (synthesizer) and Piotrek Wasilewski. Wasilewski, who was trained in classical music in his native Poland, got to hold an electric bass for the first time in his life at his first rehearsal with the band.

In early 2002, the five young musicians changed their name to Dúné and after Kolstrup bought his first analogue Synthesizer the band started writing their own material, strongly inspired by 1980s pop bands like Depeche Mode, Erasure and local Danish bands. In 2003 Dúné recorded their first demo CD entitled "Let's Jump". The demo achieved critical acclaim in Danish underground magazines foreseeing a bright future for the very young gang. The band also started building a solid live reputation playing more and more gigs in and around their native town.

In December 2003, the band initially brought in Ole Bjórn (synthesizer) and Danny Jungslund (guitar) as members before releasing their two self-financed EPs ("Rock, Synth'n'Roll" and "Go Go Robot") in 2004 and 2005. The EPs received rave reviews in the Danish media for adding both strong indie-rock and electro pop elements to the band's sound. The band started getting attention from the Danish music business and, while playing gigs all over Scandinavia in the time off high school and boarding school, got a reputation as a super intense and highly entertaining live act. After reviewing offers from many major and indie labels alike, the band decided to create their own record label New Gang of Robots Rec. as a sister company to the Danish label Iceberg Records.

=== 2006–2011: We Are In There You Are Out Here & Enter Metropolis ===
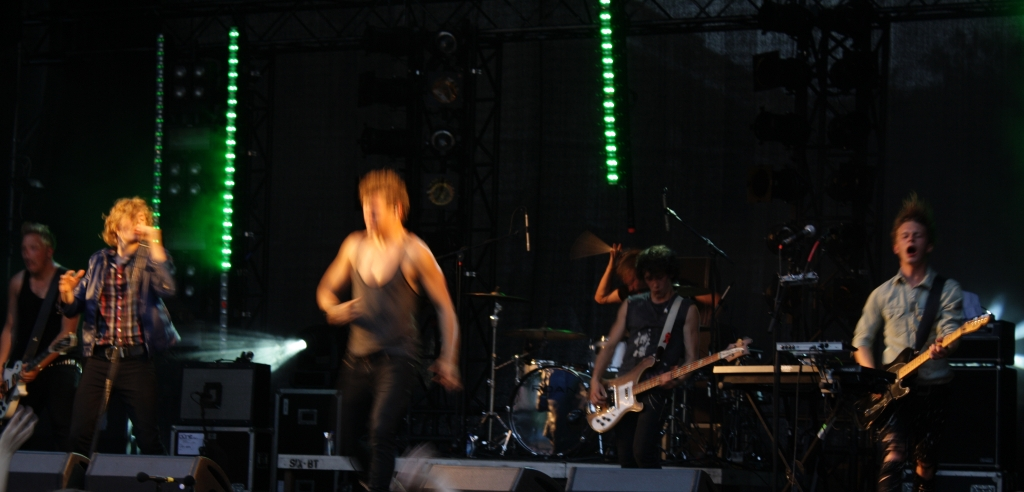
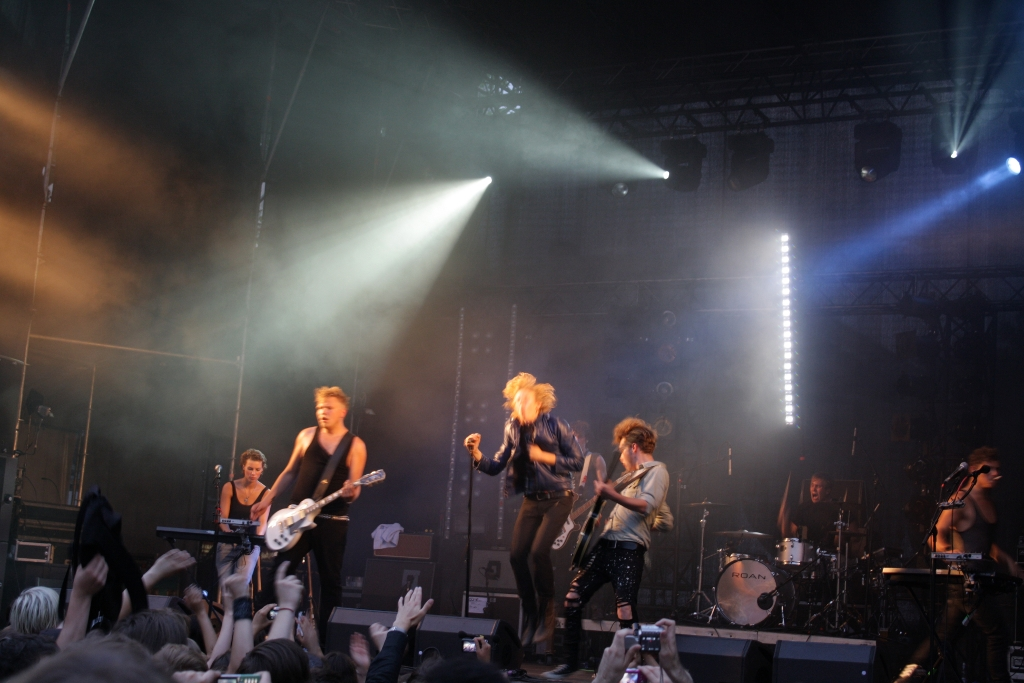
Dúné in Bochum, Germany, 2009

In 2006, the band had their national breakthrough in Denmark with their debut single Bloodlines. They were nominated as talent of the year at the annual music awards held by the Danish radio station DR P3 and performed at the SPOT festival and Roskilde Festival in Denmark. Same year Dúné signed a license deal with Sony Music Europe.

In 2007 and 2008, their debut album We Are In There You Are Out Here was released in Europe and Japan certified Platinum by the International Federation of the Phonographic Industry Denmark and the band won several awards like three Danish Music Awards, the P3 GULD Award and two GAFFA Awards. They performed as the support band during Panic! at the Disco's 2008 tour in Germany and supported Muse and Foo Fighters in the same period. Furthermore, they were the opening band at the 2008 Jäzzfest tour of the German punk legends Die Ärzte performing for audience throughout Europe.

After graduating high school in 2008, the band moved to the Danish capital Copenhagen and started writing and recording their second studio album Enter Metropolis with Jacob Hansen (Volbeat) as the producer. Normally producing heavy metal, Hansen helped push the harder guitar driven electro sound of the record. Enter Metropolis was released in Europe in August 2009 to positive to mixed reviews. The album peaked at No. 4 on the Danish album chart and No. 44 on the German album chart. Enter Metropolis is certified Gold på IFPI Denmark. The band went touring in support of the album and played just shy of 100 concerts in Europe.

In 2009, Dúné wins an EBBA Award. Every year the European Border Breakers Awards (EBBA) recognize the success of ten emerging artists or groups who reached audiences outside their own countries with their first internationally released album in the past year.

In 2011, the fourth single off "Enter Metropolis", "Heiress of Valentina", was remixed by Swedish DJ and producer Alesso resulting in a worldwide club hit.

In the summer of 2009, after less than a year in Copenhagen, the band decided to move to the German capitol Berlin to strengthen their international ambitions. From Berlin the band kept touring until Kolstrup's 22nd birthday on 11 September 2010 where they took a break to begin the song writing for their third album while having to deal with three shattering events. First the sole female member and keyboarder Cecilie Dyrberg decided to leave the band to focus on her own music and to "live a life outside the band she'd been a part of for half of her life." In May 2011, Malte Aarup-Sørensen and Dúné parted ways amicably. Then again in November 2011 Dúné parted ways with guitar player Simon Troelsgaard leaving the band as a quartet with Danish session ace Morten Hellborn filling the drum seat for the shows and recordings. On the band's homepage lead singer Mattias Kolstrup wrote a blog on 14 February 2012 saying: "I'm well aware of the fact that losing three band members in between two albums seems like a pretty big deal, but for some reason it feels like a natural development for us. You've gotta remember that we've been a band for almost 11 years already. We began when we were 12!"

=== 2012–2014: Wild Hearts ===
On 21 June 2012, the band announced that they had started recording their 3rd album over five month prior (on 13 Jan). Furthermore, they announced that the album was being mixed by Kevin Paul who've worked with Depeche Mode and Nick Cave. In an interview with GaffaTV, released on gaffa.dk on 21 June, Ole Bjórn revealed that the album was self-produced by the band.

The first single off the album was "HELL NO!" It was released on 10 November and premiered at Danish Music Awards in Copenhagen. Released on 21 January "All That I Have" was the second single off the album becoming a radio hit. Wild Hearts was released on 4 February 2013 and debuted at #3 on the official Danish Album Chart. It was mostly well received by the Danish critics with an overweight of 5/6 star reviews. The biggest Danish music magazine GAFFA wrote: "Their strongest collection of songs to date". Anders Houmøller Thomsen from Jyllands-Posten praised the band for rocking out instead of lapsing into "acoustic senior-nastalgia", while Berlingske reviewer Jesper Krogsgaard Christensen described the album as "the band's best album to date".

During 2013 and 2014, the band moved back to Copenhagen while touring intensively in Denmark and Germany. Guitarist Danny Jungslund decided to stay in Germany and take an indefinite hiatus from the band while focusing on his studies and family.

In November 2014, the band released the Spring Summer 15 clothing collection Dúné/minimum in collaboration with the Danish fashion brand "minimum". To promote the collection the band released the new song "Antidote" accompanied by a short mood-film written and directed by Mattias brother, Jeppe Kolstrup.

=== 2015–2018: DELTA and split-up ===
In September 2015, Universal Music secured a record deal with the band and released their major label debut single "Trying to Get to You" on 18 September.

On 23 September 2016, Dúné released their fourth album DELTA. The album went top ten in Denmark making it their fourth consecutive album to do so.

From 21 January 2016 to 18 November 2017, Dúné played their biggest tours in Denmark yet, with more than 100 dates. "The Grand Tour 2016" and "DELTA Tour 2017" was mostly sold out and underlined the bands status as one of their native Denmark's most popular live acts.

In August 2018, Dúné split up to focus on individual projects. They played three goodbye shows at the SmukFest festival and twice sold out at the Copenhagen venue 'Vega'.

== Members ==
=== Last-known lineup ===
Mattias Kolstrup – vocals (2001–2018)
Piotrek Wasilewski – bass, synthesizers, percussion (2002–2018)
Ole Bjórn – synthesizers, piano, programming, vocals (2003–2018)

=== Former members ===
Simon Troelsgaard – guitar (2001–2011)
Malte Aarup-Sørensen – drums (2001–2011)
Cecilie Dyrberg – synthesizers, guitars, vocals (2002–2010)
Danny Jungslund – guitars (2003–2013)

=== Touring/Session members ===
Morten Hellborn – drums (2011–?)
Mikkel Balle Poulsen – guitar (2014–?)

== Discography ==
=== Studio albums ===
Year	Title	Peak positions		Certification
Year	Title	DEN	GER	Certification
2007	We Are in There You Are Out Here	9	—	IFPI DEN: Platinum
2009	Enter Metropolis	4	44	IFPI DEN: Gold
2013	Wild Hearts	3	—	
2016	Delta	7	—	
"—" marks a release that has not charted or has not been released in that territory.

=== Extended plays ===
- Let's Jump (Demo CD, 2003)
- Rock, Synth'n'Roll (2004)
- Go Go Robot (2005)
- Bloodlines EP (exclusively released in Germany, Austria and Switzerland, 2007)
- Dry Lips EP (2007)
- 80 Years EP (2008)
- Leaving Metropolis (2010)

=== Charting singles ===
Year	Title	Peak chart positions	
Year	Title	DEN	GER
2007	"Dry Lips^{[I]}"	2	86
2008	"80 Years"	37	—
2009	"Victim of the City / Heat"	—	94
2009	"Let Go of Your Love^{[II]}"	3	—
2010	"Heiress of Valentina (Princess) ^{[II]}"	22	—
