= Hanne Boel =

Danish singer (born 1957)

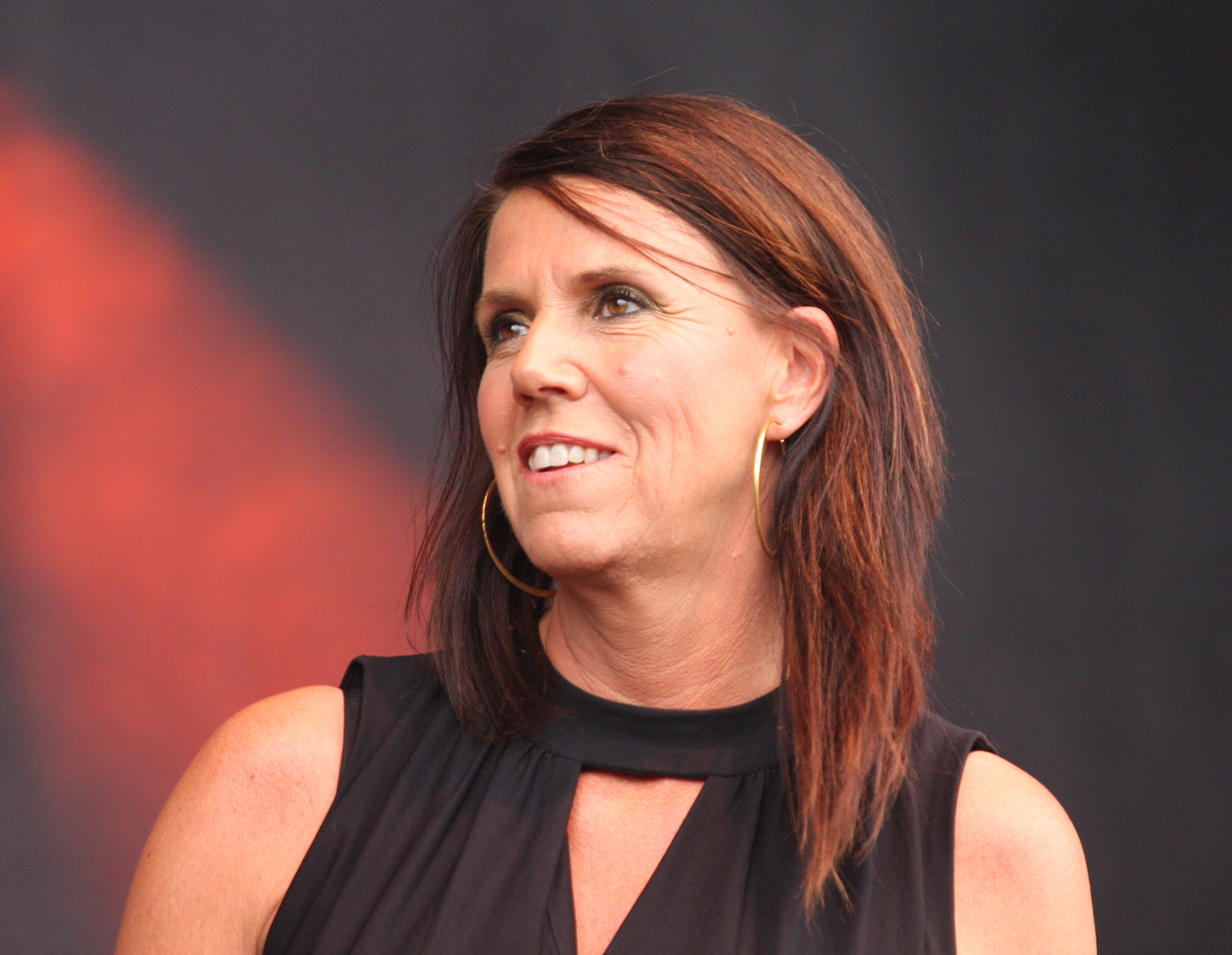
Hanne Boel in 2009

Hanne Boel (born 31 August 1957) is a Danish singer.

Hanne Boel covers in her songs a range of styles including pop, soul, gospel, rock, and jazz. Over the course of her career, she has sold over 2.5 million records, and has had great success on the Scandinavian charts, although her work is less well known throughout the rest of the world.

== Biography ==
Hanne Boel was born in Bagsværd, Copenhagen. She graduated from the Royal Danish Academy of Music in 1980, and then spent a year at the Berklee College of Music in Boston, Massachusetts. In the five years following her return to Denmark, she divided her time between singing with the Danish funk band Blast, performing as a choir soloist, and teaching music at a variety of schools and clinics.

In 1987, Hanne Boel recorded a jazz album, Shadow of Love, with Jørgen Emborg, Mads Vinding, and Alex Riel. The following year she released her own album, Black Wolf, which featured performances in the R&B/soul vein. The album was a great success, winning her the Danish Music Award for Danish Female Singer of the Year. Her 1990 follow-up album, Dark Passion, won four 1991 Danish Music Awards: Album of the Year, Singer of the Year, Hit of the Year ("I Wanna Make Love to You"), and Producer of the Year (Poul Bruun).

Over the subsequent two decades, Hanne Boel has released 15 additional albums, and continues to enjoy success in Scandinavia. Her two most recent albums mark a return to a more jazz-influenced genre.

== Discography ==
=== Blast ===
- 1983: Blast
- 1986: Blast 2
- 2005: Replay

=== Solo ===
- 1987: Shadow of Love (Boel/Emborg/Winding/Riel)
- 1988: Black Wolf
- 1990: Dark Passion
- 1992: My Kindred Spirit
- 1992: Kinda Soul
- 1994: Misty Paradise
- 1995: Best of Hanne Boel
- 1996: Silent Violence
- 1998: Need
- 1999: Strangely Disturbed (live)
- 2000: Boel & Hall (with Martin Hall)

Year	Album	Peak positions	Certification
Year	Album	DEN	Certification
2002	Beware of the Dog	1	
2004	Abaco	2	
2007	Private Eye	7	
2008	A New Kinda Soul	8	
2010	I Think It's Going to Rain (with Carsten Dahl)	30	
2011	The Shining of Things	24	
2014	Outtakes	18	
2020	Between Dark and Daylight	26	

=== Other work ===
- 1989: Bakerman by Laid Back
