= Love Shop =

Danish pop rock band

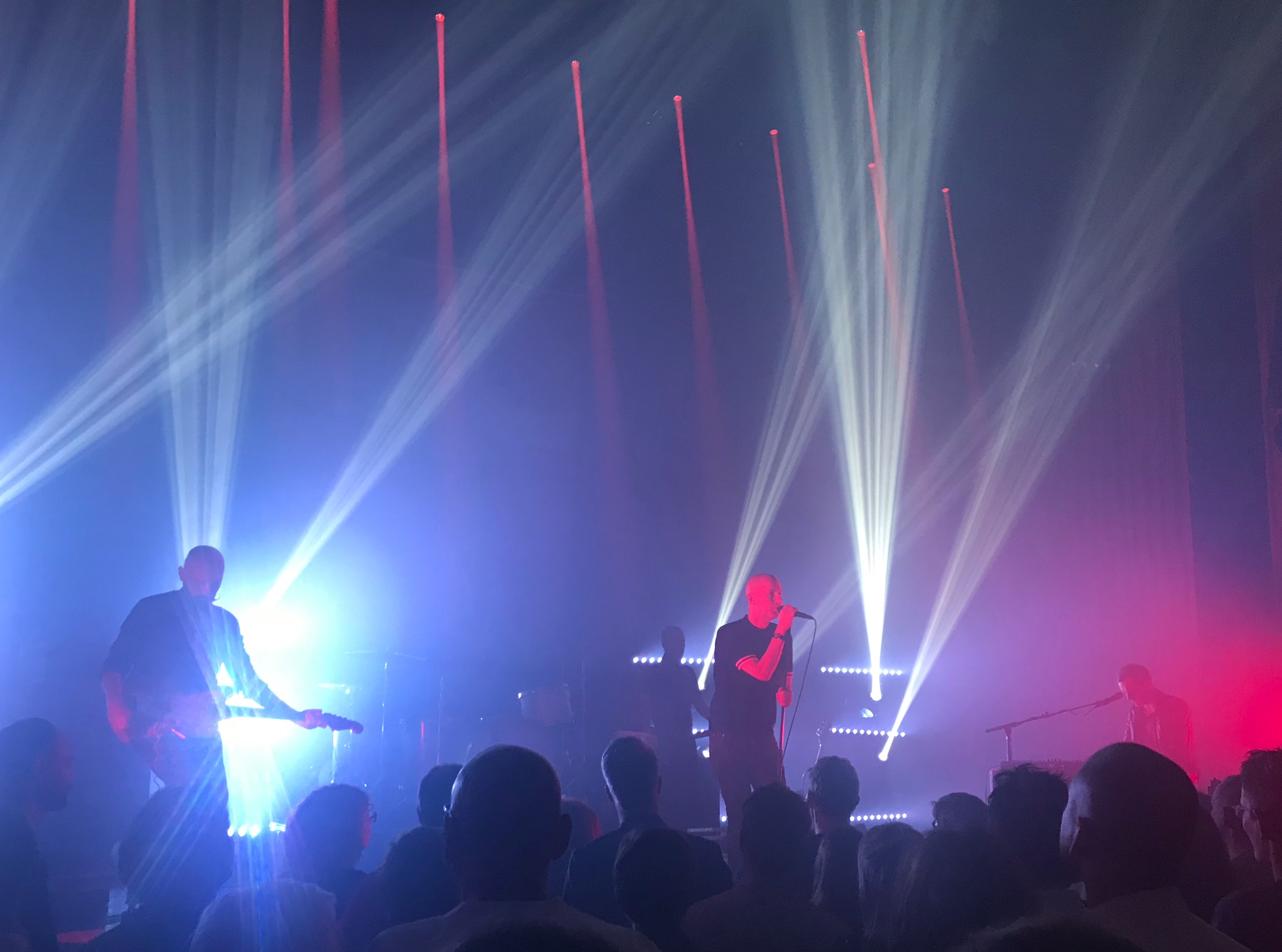
Love Shop live at Mantziusgaarden, Birkerød, Denmark. 2019

Love Shop is a Danish pop rock band. The band was formed in 1986 by vocalist/songwriter Jens Unmack and guitarist/producer Hilmer Hassig, later joined by harmonicist Henrik Hall. They found great success in Denmark with their debut album 1990, which went on to win the Danish Grammy for Pop Album of the Year, and are well known for songs such as "En nat bliver det sommer", "Love Goes On Forever" and "Copenhagen Dreaming". The 1997 album Go! is widely considered their magnum opus.

In 2004, the band announced an indefinite hiatus after struggling with internal disputes. Hilmer Hassig was killed in a traffic accident in 2008, and after performing two tribute concerts in his honour, the remaining band members reunited, releasing the critically acclaimed comeback album Frelsens hær in 2010. Henrik Hall died from cancer in 2011, and Unmack has since continued performing and releasing new material as the only official member of Love Shop.

== Awards ==
- 1991: Danish Grammy Awards – Danish Pop Album of the Year – 1990
- 2009: Danish Music Awards – IFPI's Honorary Award

== Discography ==
- 1990 (1990)
- DK (1992)
- Billeder af verden (1994)
- Go! (1997)
- Det løse liv (1999)
- Anti (2001)
- National (2003)
- Frelsens hær (2010)
- Skandinavisk lyst (2012)
- Kærlighed og straf (2014)
- Risiko (2017)
- Brænder boksen med smukke ting (2019)
- Levende mænd i døde forhold (2021)
- Blues Europa (2023)
- I Love You, Goodbye (2025)
