= Bikstok Røgsystem =

Danish dancehall band

- Origin: Denmark
- Genres: Dancehall, reggae
- Years active: 2005–present
- Labels: Copenhagen, Due Belier
- Members: Eagger (Dwayne McFarlane); Pharfar (Søren Schou); Blæs B (Lasse Bavngaard)

Bikstok Røgsystem is a Danish dancehall band consisting of Eaggerman (Dwayne McFarlane), Pharfar (Søren Schou) and Blæs Bukki (Lasse Bavngaard). The band is one of the first to perform reggae and dancehall in Danish.

Their debut and only album Over stok og sten was very successful, received very favourable reviews, and entered the Danish album chart as number one in February and made Gold by June 2005.

From 2006 until 2012, the group have been more or less disbanded, but it still occasionally reunited for one-off performances.

From 2013 they got together in a reunion to prepare a new EP. The result was the 2015 EP Uranium with the album being credited to Bikstok rather than the full name Bikstok Røgsystem.

== Discography ==
=== Studio albums ===
Year	Album	Peak positions	Certification
Year	Album	DEN	Certification
2005	Over stok og sten	1	

=== EPs ===
Year	Album	Peak positions	Certification
Year	Album	DEN	Certification
2015	Uranium (credited as Bikstok)	4	

=== Singles ===
Year	Single	Peak positions	Album
Year	Single	DEN	Album
2005	"Cigar"	19	Over stok og sten
2005	"Fabrik"	18	Over stok og sten
2013	"Delerium"	12	
2015	"80'eren"	40	
