= Pharfar =

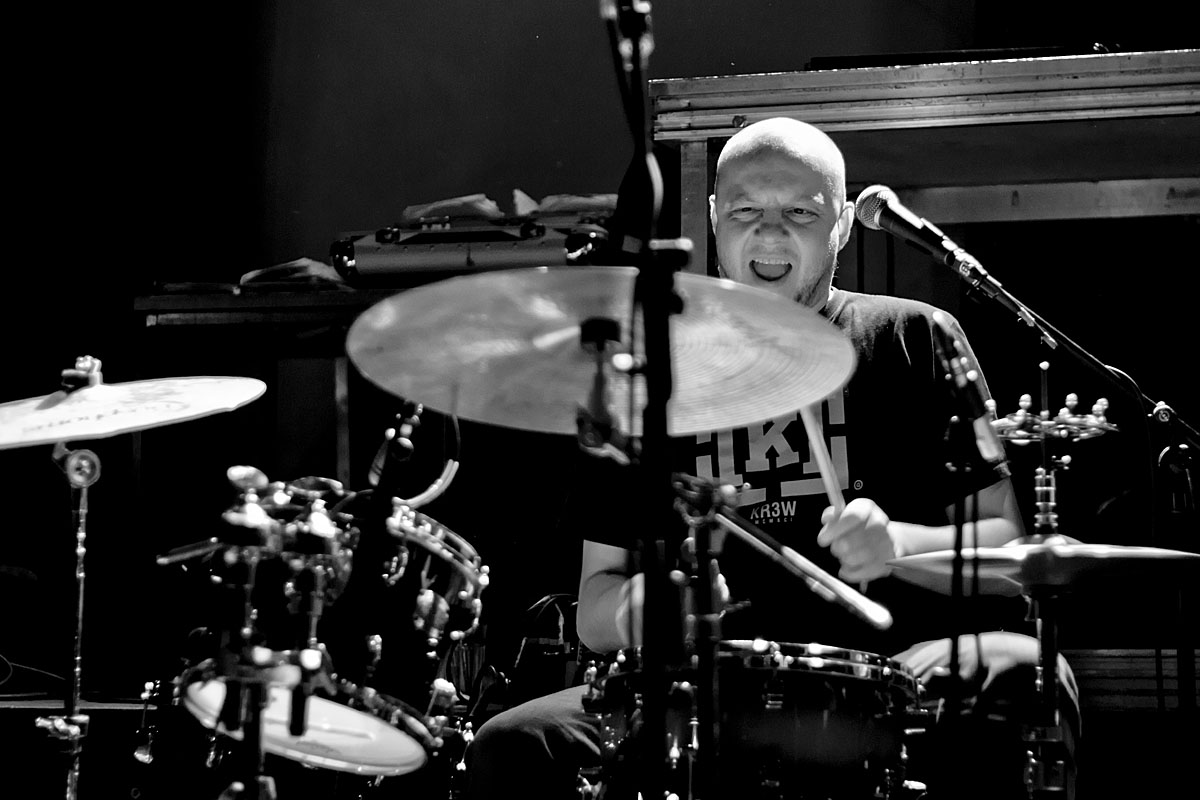

Background information
- Birth name: Søren Schou
- Born: Copenhagen
- Genres: Reggae/dancehall
- Occupation(s): Drummer, dj, producer and singer
- Instrument(s): Drums, voice, beatmaking
- Labels: Foodpalace Music Donkey Recs Musicall
- Website: http://www.musicall.dk/pharfar/

Søren Schou better known by his stage name Pharfar is a Danish reggae/dancehall-musician and producer, and known as an award-winning producer, solo artist and as part of Bikstok Røgsystem.

== Career ==
He is a self-taught drummer, DJ, producer, singer with roots in the reggae community of Copenhagen.

In 2009, he debuted as an actor in the comedy series Chapper og Pharfar, on the Danish TV-channel DR1.

In 2015 he was featured on a Remix of the song "Traffic Lights" by German singer Lena Meyer-Landrut.

== Discography ==
=== Singles ===
Year	Single	Peak positions	Certification	Album
Year	Single	DEN	Certification	Album
2013	"La' mig rulle dig"	3	Gold	TBA
2013	"Mand"	29		TBA
