= Malk de Koijn =

Danish rap group

Malk de Koijn is a Danish rap group formed in 1993, formed of three members, Tue Track (rap, keyboard, turntables), Blæs Bukki (rap and keyboards) and Geolo G (rap).

== Biography ==
Malk de Koijn formed on New Year's Eve 1993. Tue Track and Geolo G had worked together previously, and Blæs Bukki had been a part of the Danish producer team Madness 4 Real. In the group's first years they released prods (songs copied on cassette tapes) on the underground scene, such as "Lortesangen" and "Livet På Langestrand".

In 1998 their first album Smash Hit in Aberdeen was released, which was nominated for a Danish Music Award. In 1999 the group also won Maarums Lyrikpris, a poetry prize.

Their second album Sneglzilla was released in 2002. It was named the best album of 2002 by Danish music magazine Gaffa and national newspapers Politiken and Ekstra Bladet, and won two Danish Music Awards, two Steppeulve, and six prizes at the Danish Hiphop Awards.

Between 2002 and 2011 the three members worked on other projects. Blæs Bukki was part of the Dancehall/ragga group Bikstok Røgsystem. Tue Track worked as a producer under the name Track 72, and released an album, Rockin'. He is also a part of the band Booty Cologne. Blæs Bukki and Geolo G were part of the play Peer Gynt in Copenhagen's Betty Nansen Theatre.

In 2006 Geolo G announced his retirement from the music industry.

Malk de Koijn were booked for the 2009 Roskilde Festival. They played at the Arena Stage during the night between Saturday and Sunday. In 2010-11 the three rappers started meeting again for jam sessions, which resulted in the 2011 album, Toback to the Fromtime, released on 19 September 2011. The album went to #1 on the Danish album chart.

In 2016 Tue Track recorded the album The Unreal Zound using only material from the Danish rock group PowerSolo.

== Discography ==
=== Albums ===
Year	Album	Chart position
Year	Album	DEN
1998	Smash Hit in Aberdeen	–
2002	Sneglzilla	7
2010	Smash Hit in Aberdeen (re-release)	38
2011	Toback to the Fromtime	1

=== EPs ===
- 1998: "Å ÅÅ Mæio/Jim Daggert Huggert" (vinyl and EP)
- 1998: "Jagt" (vinyl and EP)
- 1998: "Ørkenstorm i Aberdeen (EP)
- 1999: "Kosmisk Kaos/P.I.G.E." (10" vinyl)
- 2002: "Los Salvajes (Caracoles Marinos)/Gusto (7" vinyl)
- 2002: "Rocstar" - (vinyl and EP)
- 2002: "Vi Tager Fuglen På Dig" (vinyl and EP)

=== Singles ===
Year	Song	Peak position	Certification	Album
Year	Song	DEN	Certification	Album
2011	"Toback to the Fromtime"	6		Toback to the Fromtime

=== Other appearances ===
- 1996: "Til De Folk" - Various Artists (De Grimme Ællinger - Rappen Fra Undergrunden - Track 9)
  - 1996: "Vi Stikker Ikke Op For Bollemælk" - Various Artists (Rap'O'Mania vol. 1 - Track 10)
- 1996: "Hvem Er Det Der Banker?" - Hvid Sjokolade (Så'n Er Vi - Track 12)

== Awards ==
Danish HipHop Awards 2003

- "Best producer": Tue Track
- "Best Danish single/EP": Malk de Koijn for "Vi tager fuglen på dig"
- "Best group": Malk de Koijn
- "Best Danish music video": Malk de Koijn for "Vi tager Fuglen på dig"
- "Best lyrics": Malk de Koijn
- "Best Danish album": Malk de Koijn for "Sneglzilla"

Danish Music Awards 2003

- "Best Danish music video": Malk de Koijn for "Vi tager Fuglen på dig"

P3 Guld 2003

- "Syng Dansk Prisen": Malk de Koijn

Årets Steppeulv 2003

- "Best album": Malk de Koijn for "Sneglzilla"
- "Best orchestra": Malk de Koijn

Årets Steppeulv 2012

- "Best orchestra"
- "Best album" for Toback to the Fromtime
- "Best lyrics"

Danish Music Awards 2012

- Danish Album of the Year
- Danish Live Name of the Year
- Danish Urban-album of the Year for "Toback to the Fromtime"
