= C.V. Jørgensen =

Danish musician known for mellow, satirical songs

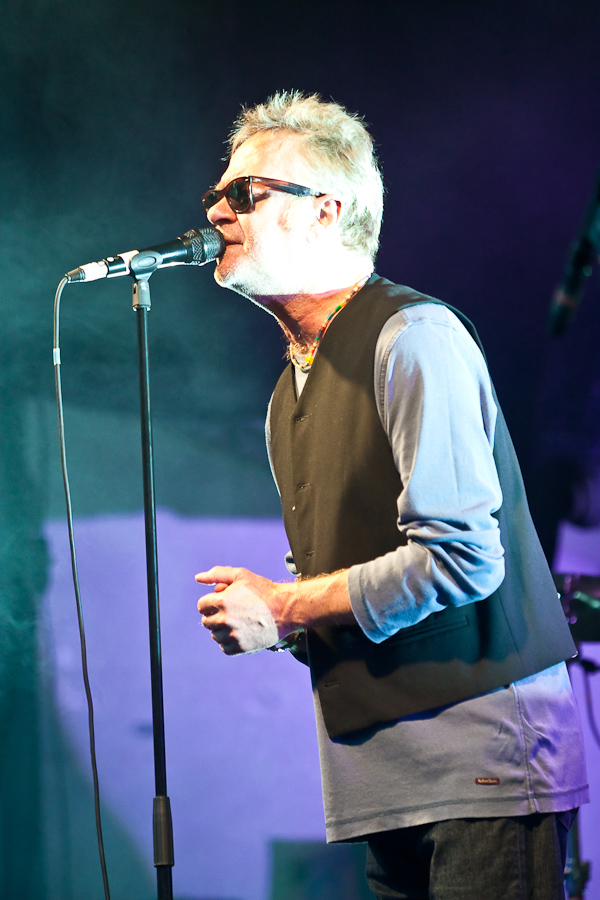
C. V. Jørgensen in Roskilde Bypark, Denmark on the 13. July 2010

C.V. Jørgensen (born 9 May 1950) is a Danish music composer, guitarist and singer-songwriter.

C.V. Jørgensen sings exclusively in Danish. His songs are mellow and the lyrics are delivered in an inventive and laconic style. Some songs revolves around hypocrisy in society at large with a critical, sarcastic and satirical exposure of the philistines, while other songs deal with existential issues or paint surreal poetic images. His album "Tidens Tern" from 1980, was selected for the Danish Culture Canon in 2006.

== Discography ==
- En Stynet Strejfer (1974)
- T-shirts, terylenebukser og gummisko (1975)
- Storbyens små oaser (1977)
- Vild i varmen (1978)
- Solgt til stanglakrids (1979)
- Tidens tern (1980)
- Lediggang a go go (1982)
- Vennerne og vejen (1985)
- Indian summer (1988)
- I det muntre hjørne (1990)
- Sjælland (1994)
- Fraklip fra det fjerne (2002)

Compilation albums

- Det Ganske Lille Bands Bedste (1980)
- 16 Hits (1992)
- Skygger og Magi (1996)
- De 2 Første (2004)
- Fire Originale Album Fra EMI's Skatkammer (2009)
- C. V. Jørgensen - 4 Originale Albums (2011)
- Det Ganske Lille Band 1977-1979 (2011)

Live albums

- Lige lovlig live (1986)
- Så live som muligt (2003)
- Sange fra scenen (2012)

== See also ==
- List of Danish composers

== Sources ==
- Martinov, Niels: "C.V. Jørgensen - En biografi om den danske rockpoet", ISBN 87-7055-095-6 Biography
- This article was initially translated from the Danish Wikipedia.
