= Ulige Numre =

Danish rock band

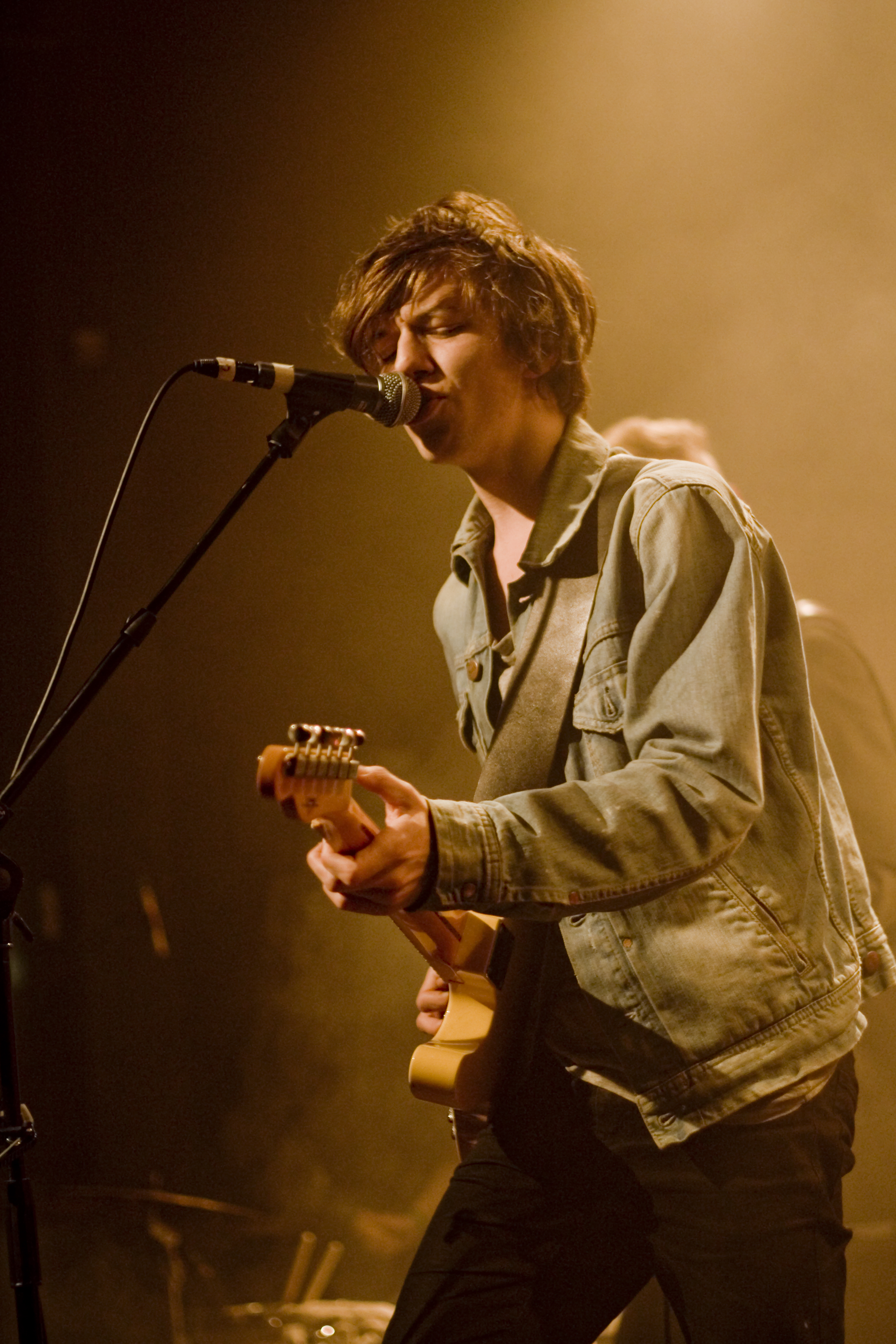
- Ulige Numre lead singer Carl Emil Møller Petersen at Forbrændingen in January 2012.

Background information
- Genres: Pop
- Years active: 2011 – 2017
- Labels: A:larm / Universal Music
- Members: Carl Emil Møller Petersen; Lasse Ziegler; Teis Lindeskov Søgaard; Jacob Ulstrup

Ulige Numre is a Danish rock band made up of Carl Emil Møller Petersen (vocals and guitar), Teis Lindeskov Søgaard (drums) and Jacob Ulstrup (keyboards). They are signed to A:larm / Universal Music label.

== Career ==
Ulige Numre ("odd numbers" in Danish), played their debut gig 26 November 2010 in "HUSET-KBH", placed in Magstræde in Copenhagen. Playing early songs such as "Sølvvognen"("silver chariot") and "Hænder"("hands"). Through 2011 they built up a small fanbase in Copenhagen, while they recorded their music. The 26 September 2011 their debut single "København" ("Copenhagen") was released. Straight away it went to be a charting single. The self-produced music video was launched on their YouTube channel. The video, containing old footage about Copenhagen and clips from feature films, received wide media coverage and attention on social media sites. The single was promoted on DR P3, and the band made appearances on TV shows including Det Nye Talkshow - med Anders Lund Madsen. In 2012, "København" won "Best Song 2012" at Årets Steppeulv awards.

On 31 October 2011, the band released its well-received self-titled EP Ulige numre. It was released on Auditorium label and is produced by Nikolaj Nørlund. The singles "København" and "Navn i sneen" ("name in the snow") received heavy airplay on Danish radio station P3. In 2012 Ulige Numre had a growing fanbase and played concerts all over Denmark, mainly on Danish festivals, the biggest being Roskilde Festival. In June 2013, the single "Blå" (meaning "blue") was released and received a lot of airplay on Danish radio. The single reached number 38 on the Danish charts. The 12 August their debut album "Nu til Dags" ("nowadays") was released, and went number 1 on the Danish charts. The 19 September 2013 Ulige Numre began their "Nu til Dags"-tour around Denmark. The tour began in Aarhus and ended in Copenhagen 26 October.

== Split ==
The members of Ulige Numre announced that they were dissolving the band in a letter posted on their Facebook page on 15 March 2017.

== In popular culture ==
- On 18 February 2012, the Danish reality television X Factor contestant Morten Benjamin performed the Ulige Numre's "København"

== Discography ==
=== Albums ===
Year	Album	Peak chart positions	Certifications
Year	Album	DEN	Certifications
2015	Grand Prix	1	
2013	Nu til Dags	1	

=== EPs ===
- 2011: Ulige Numre

=== Singles ===
Year	Single	Peak chart positions	Certifications	Album
Year	Single	DEN	Certifications	Album
2012	"København"	8		
2013	"Blå"	39		
