= Szhirley =

Danish singer (born 1976)

Szhirley Nova Beanca Rokahaim (born Shirley Haim on 23 September 1976) is a Danish singer known as Szhirley. She is best known for her EMI Denmark English-language debut album I'm Coming (1996) which was a moderate success in Denmark, but a major success in Japan.

Szhirley performed backing vocals on OMD's "Pulse" (2010).

== Discography ==
- I'm Coming (1996)
- Hjerter dame (2008)
- Timeglas (2016)

Featured in

- DR Big Band, The James Bond Classics (feat. Szhirley) (EMI/Red Dot, 2008)
- Alexander Brown, Sidste Gang (feat. Szhirley) (2012)

== Theatre ==
- Elsk Mig i Nat (2009-2012)
- Shrek (2013)
- Tam Tam revyen (2014-2015)
- We Will Rock You (2017)
