= List of number-one songs of the 2000s (Denmark) =

Single Top 20, later as Single Top-20 and Track Top-40 is a record chart that ranks the best-performing songs of Denmark. Chart was owned by IFPI Danmark and Nielsen Music Control. Listings were provided through Billboard magazine under its "Hits of the World" section. Hitlisten, consisting of the Single Top-20 and Download Top 20 charts, launched on 1 January 2001 and served as the official chart for record sales in Denmark until the end of October 2007. Tracklisten was established 2 November 2007 with the Hitlisten charts being discontinued. Tracklisten is compiled by Nielsen Music Control in association with IFPI Danmark.

During the 2000s, 135 singles reached the number-one position on the chart. Band Depeche Mode was the most successful at reaching the top spot, with 5 number-one singles. Trine Dyrholm's EP "Mr. Nice Guy" spent 62 weeks at number one during 2005 and 2007, which was the longest spell at the top of the chart of the decade. The first number one of the decade, the "Love Will Keep Us Together" by Daniel. "Bad Romance" by Lady Gaga was the final number one of the decade.

== Number one singles ==
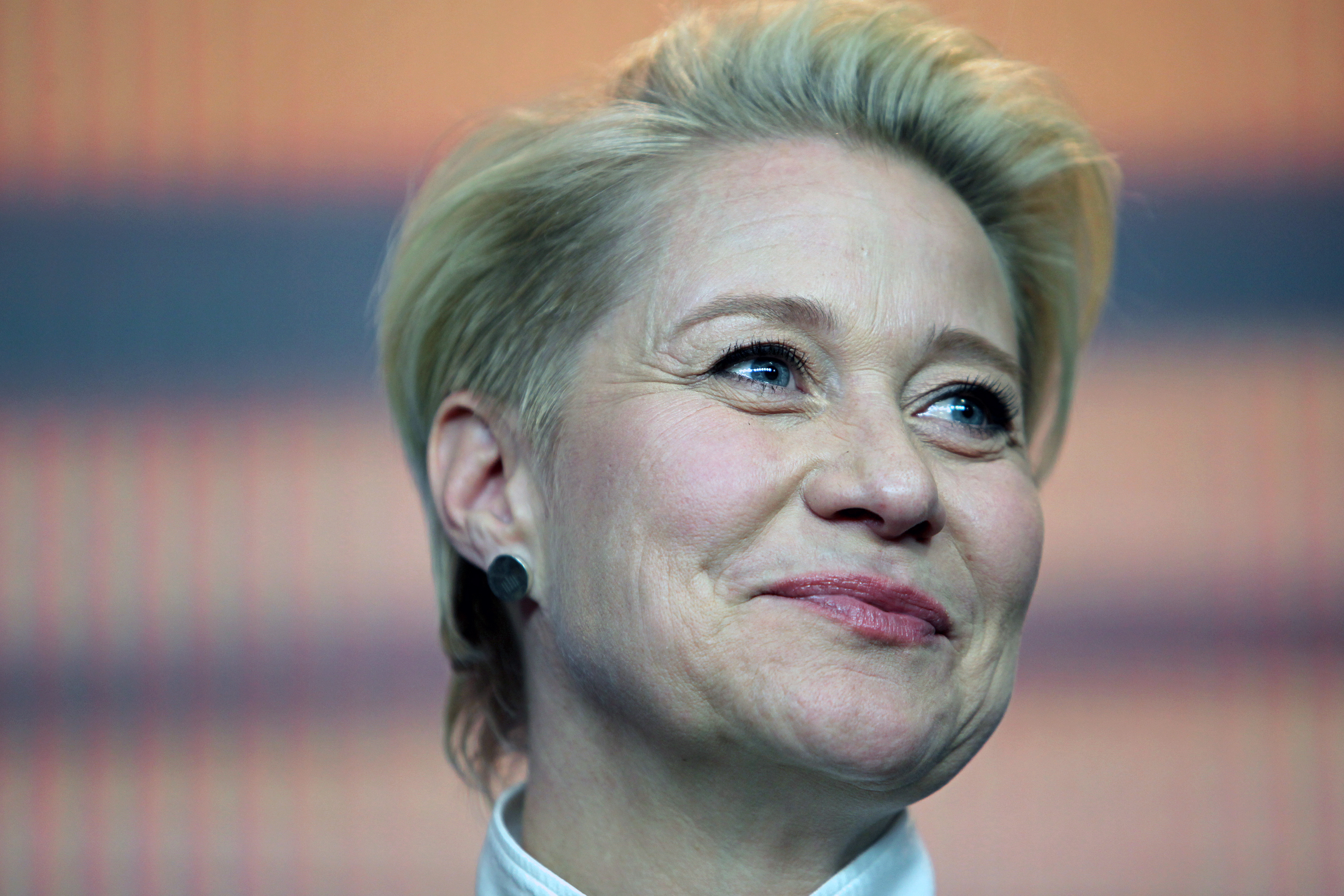
Trine Dyrholm's (pictured in 2016) EP "Mr. Nice Guy" spent 62 weeks at top the chart

Artist(s)	Title	Reached number one	Weeks at number one
Daniel	"Love Will Keep Us Together"	1 January 2000	1
Creamy	"Den Bedste Jul I 2000 År"	8 January 2000	1
Eiffel 65	"Move Your Body"	15 January 2000	3
Aqua	"Cartoon Heroes"	5 February 2000	5
DJ Aligator Project	"The Whistle Song"	11 March 2000	8
Britney Spears	"Oops!...I Did It Again"	6 May 2000	3
Olsen Brødrene	"Smuk Som Et Stjerneskud"	27 May 2000	4
DJ Aligator Project	"Lollipop"	24 June 2000	5
Olsen Brødrene	"Smuk Som Et Stjerneskud"	29 July 2000	1
DJ Aligator Project	"Lollipop"	5 August 2000	1
Ronan Keating	"Life Is a Rollercoaster"	12 August 2000	1
Melanie C	"I Turn To You"	19 August 2000	1
Rollo & King	"Ved Du Hvad Hun Sagde?"	26 August 2000	10
Tubby Gold	"My Golden Danish Collection"	4 November 2000	1
Safri Duo	"Played-A-Live (The Bongo Song)"	11 November 2000	3
Sort Sol	"Nights In White Satin"	2 December 2000	1
Mark Linn	"You You You"	9 December 2000	4
Hitlisten
Eminem (featuring Dido)	"Stan"	5 January 2001	3
Safri Duo	"Played-A-Live (The Bongo Song)"	26 January 2001	5
Rollo & King	"Der Står Et Billede Af Dig På Mit Bord"	2 March 2001	1
DJ Encore (featuring Engelina)	"I See Right Through to You"	9 March 2001	1
Safri Duo	"Played-A-Live (The Bongo Song)"	16 March 2001	6
Baren	"Vi Lever Kun Én Gang"	27 April 2001	1
Depeche Mode	"Dream On"	4 May 2001	1
Crazy Town	"Butterfly"	11 May 2001	3
Christian	"Du Kan Gøre Hvad Du Vil"	1 June 2001	13
Dante Thomas (featuring Pras)	"Miss California"	31 August 2001	1
Christian	"Du Kan Gøre Hvad Du Vil"	7 September 2001	2
Uncle Kracker	"Follow Me"	21 September 2001	1
Kylie Minogue	"Can't Get You Out Of My Head"	28 September 2001	3
Christian & Patrik Isaksson	"Tilbage Hvor Vi Var"	19 October 2001	2
EyeQ	"I Want What She's Got"	2 November 2001	9
Afroman	"Because I Got High"	4 January 2002	1
Anastacia	"Paid My Dues"	11 January 2002	1
Gigi D'Agostino	"L'Amour Toujours"	18 January 2002	1
Nickelback	"How You Remind Me"	25 January 2002	2
Shakira	"Whenever, Wherever"	8 February 2002	10
George Michael	"Freeek!"	29 March 2002	1
DJ Aligator Project	"Stomp!"	26 April 2002	3
Ronan Keating	"If Tomorrow Never Comes"	17 May 2002	2
Eminem	"Without Me"	31 May 2002	3
Elvis vs. JXL	"A Little Less Conversation"	21 June 2002	11
George Michael	"Shoot The Dog"	9 August 2002	1
Outlandish	"Guantanamo"	6 September 2002	2
Suede	"Positivity"	27 September 2002	1
Las Ketchup	"The Ketchup Song (Aserejé)"	4 October 2002	6
Jon	"Right Here Next To You"	15 November 2002	4
Julie	"Every Little Part Of Me"	13 December 2002	4
t.A.T.u.	"All The Things She Said"	10 January 2003	1
Julie	"Every Little Part Of Me"	17 January 2003	2
Eminem	"Lose Yourself"	31 January 2003	1
Christine Milton	"Superstar"	7 February 2003	7
50 Cent	"In Da Club"	28 March 2003	5
Madonna	"American Life"	25 April 2003	1
Laze	"Steppin' Out"	9 May 2003	1
Fu:el	"Please Please"	16 May 2003	4
Daniel Bedingfield	"If You're Not The One"	13 June 2003	4
UFO & Yepha	"Hver Dag"	11 July 2003	7
Safri Duo	"Fallin' High"	22 August 2003	2
The Black Eyed Peas	"Where Is The Love?"	12 September 2003	7
Blue	"Guilty"	31 October 2003	1
Sugababes	"Hole In The Head"	7 November 2003	1
Kylie Minogue	"Slow"	14 November 2003	1
Britney Spears (featuring Madonna)	"Me Against The Music"	21 November 2003	1
Maria Lucia	"Taking Back My Heart"	28 November 2003	8
Kevin Lyttle	"Turn Me On"	23 January 2004	9
Usher	"Yeah!"	26 March 2004	3
Eamon	"Fuck It (I Don't Want You Back)"	16 April 2004	3
Erann DD	"When You Hold Me"	30 April 2004	5
Team Easy On	"De Skal Have Baghjul Nede I Touren"	11 June 2004	11
O-Zone	"Dragostea Din Tei"	27 August 2004	1
The Loft	"City Of Dreams"	3 September 2004	7
Robbie Williams	"Radio"	22 October 2004	1
Depeche Mode	"Enjoy The Silence 04"	29 October 2004	1
Brian McFadden	"Real To Me"	5 November 2004	2
Eminem	"Just Lose It"	12 November 2004	1
U2	"Vertigo"	19 November 2004	2
Band Aid 20	"Do They Know It's Christmas?"	10 December 2004	4
Erasure	"Breathe"	14 January 2005	2
Giv Til Asien	"Hvor små vi er"	28 January 2005	15
D-A-D	"Scare Yourself"	22 April 2005	1
Dukkerne Fra B&U	"Lad Det Ske"	13 May 2005	2
Akon	"Lonely"	27 May 2005	4
Anna David	"Fuck Dig"	17 June 2005	11
Crazy Frog	"Axel F"	1 July 2005	1
Trine Dyrholm	"Mr. Nice Guy"	16 September 2005	12
Depeche Mode	"Precious"	14 October 2005	1
Madonna	"Hung Up"	18 November 2005	1
Dolph (featuring NBTB)	"Arghhh!!!"	23 December 2005	2
Trine Dyrholm	"Mr. Nice Guy"	6 January 2006	29
Depeche Mode	"Suffer Well"	7 April 2006	1
Red Hot Chili Peppers	"Dani California"	12 May 2006	1
Gnarls Barkley	"Crazy"	19 May 2006	3
Depeche Mode	"John The Revelator / Lilian"	23 June 2006	1
Basshunter	"Boten Anna"	30 June 2006	14
U2 and Green Day	"The Saints Are Coming"	17 November 2006	3
Take That	"Patience"	12 January 2007	2
UFO Yepha	"Fluen På Væggen"	19 January 2007	1
Nelly Furtado	"All Good Things (Come To An End)"	26 January 2007	4
KNA Connected	"Fibs (Løgn & Latin)"	2 March 2007	4
Kenneth Bager (featuring Gisli and The Hellerup Cool School Choir)	"Fragment Eight (The Sound Of Swing)"	30 March 2007	1
Mika	"Grace Kelly"	6 April 2007	5
Timbaland (featuring Nelly Furtado and Justin Timberlake)	"Give It To Me"	13 April 2007	1
Alphabeat	"10.000 Nights Of Thunder"	20 April 2007	5
Rihanna (featuring Jay-Z)	"Umbrella"	1 June 2007	6
Timbaland (featuring Keri Hilson)	"The Way I Are"	20 July 2007	12
Private	"My Secret Lover"	12 October 2007	3
Tracklisten
Nephew (featuring L.O.C.)	"Hospital"	2 November 2007	6
Alex (featuring Nik & Jay)	"Hvad Nu Hvis"	4 December 2007	3
Lizzie	"Ramt I Natten"	4 January 2008	12
Madonna (featuring Justin Timberlake)	"4 Minutes"	28 March 2008	4
Martin	"The 1"	4 April 2008	4
Martin	"Show The World"	23 May 2008	4
Rihanna	"Take A Bow"	20 June 2008	1
Sys Bjerre	"Malene"	27 June 2008	8
Katy Perry	"I Kissed A Girl"	22 August 2008	7
Nik & Jay	"Kommer Igen"	10 October 2008	4
Britney Spears	"Womanizer"	7 November 2008	1
Katy Perry	"Hot n Cold"	14 November 2008	4
Beyoncé	"If I Were A Boy"	28 November 2008	1
Guru Josh Project	"Infinity 2008"	5 December 2008	4
Katy Perry	"Hot n Cold"	19 December 2008	2
Medina	"Kun For Mig"	30 January 2009	6
Brinck	"Believe Again"	13 February 2009	1
Lady Gaga	"Poker Face"	20 February 2009	1
X Factor Finalisterne 2009	"You've Got A Friend"	27 February 2009	2
Linda Andrews	"Det Bedste Til Sidst"	3 April 2009	3
Nephew	"007 Is Also Gonna Die"	24 April 2009	1
Tina Dickow	"Open Wide"	8 May 2009	2
Jooks	"Hun Vil Ha' En Rapper"	22 May 2009	1
Alexander Rybak	"Fairytale"	29 May 2009	1
Aqua	"Back To The 80s"	5 June 2009	6
Medina (featuring L.O.C.)	"Kun For Dig"	17 July 2009	1
Milow	"Ayo Technology"	24 July 2009	2
Medina	"Velkommen Til Medina"	7 August 2009	5
Rasmus Seebach	"Engel"	21 August 2009	1
The Black Eyed Peas	"I Gotta Feeling"	28 August 2009	1
Alien Beat Club	"My Way"	25 September 2009	1
Alphabeat	"The Spell"	2 October 2009	4
Selvmord	"Råbe Under Vand"	9 October 2009	2
Thomas Helmig (featuring Medina)	"100 Dage"	13 November 2009	1
Owl City	"Fireflies"	20 November 2009	3
Lady Gaga	"Bad Romance"	11 December 2009	3

=== By artist ===
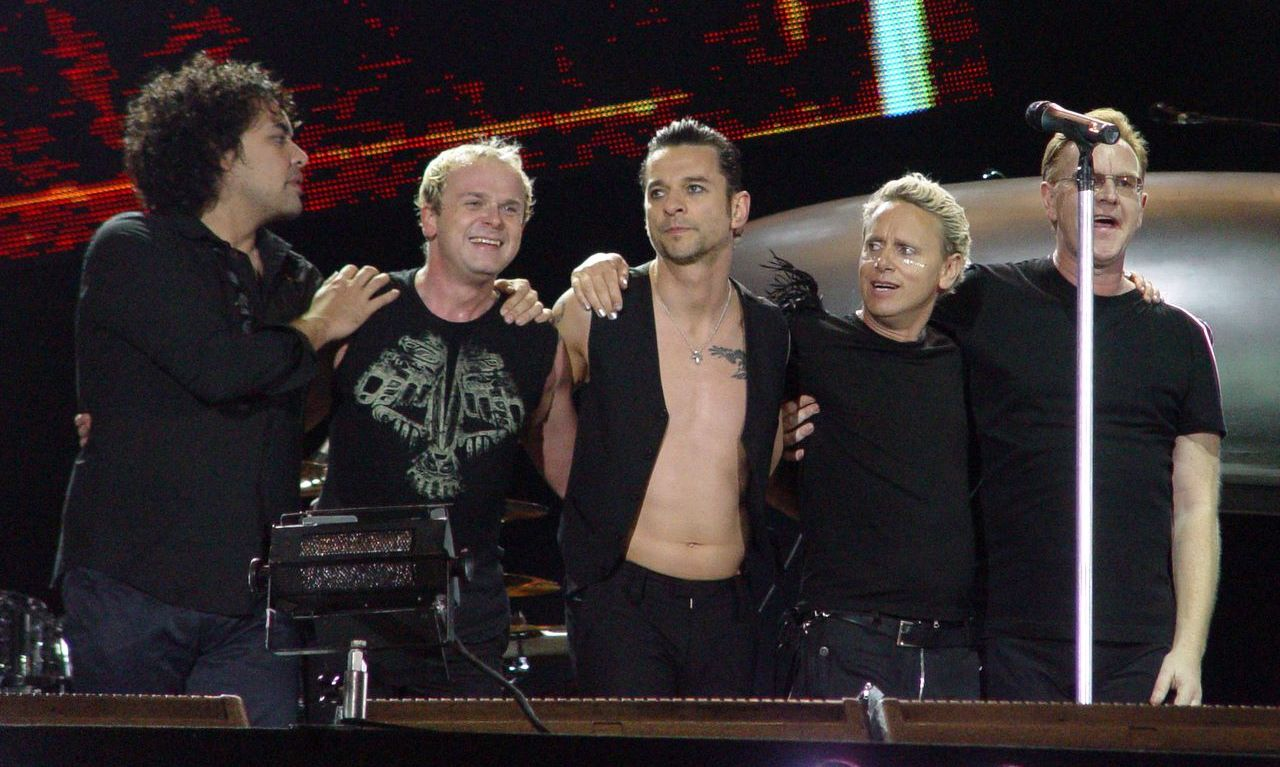
Band Depeche Mode topped the Danish singles chart five times during the 2000s.

Artist	Number-one singles	Weeks at number one
Alphabeat	2	9
Aqua	2	11
Britney Spears	3	5
Christian	2	17
Depeche Mode	5	5
DJ Aligator Project	4	17
Eminem	4	8
George Michael	2	2
Katy Perry	3	13
Kylie Minogue	2	4
Lady Gaga	2	4
Madonna	3	6
Martin	2	8
Medina	3	12
Nephew	2	7
Rihanna	2	7
Rollo & King	2	11
Ronan Keating	2	3
Safri Duo	3	16
The Black Eyed Peas	2	8
Timbaland	2	13
U2	2	5

== See also ==
- 2000s in music
