= Humaidan =

Humaidan may refer to:

- Kristian Humaidan (born 1981), Danish rapper better known as UFO and member of duo UFO & Yepha
- Nawaf Al Humaidan (born 1981), Kuwaiti football (soccer) player

== See also ==
- Humaidania or Hamidaniyeh, village in Mollasani Rural District, in the Central District of Bavi County, Khuzestan Province, Iran
