= Alexander Brown (musician) =

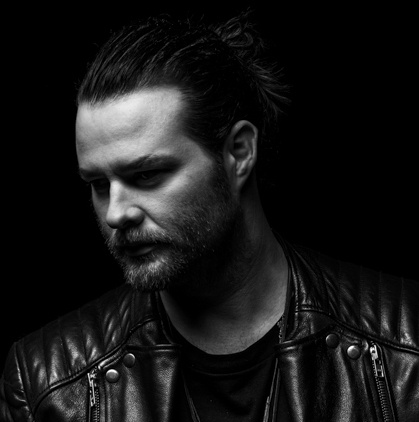
- Brown in 2015

Background information
- Born: Kenneth Alexander Nicolaisen; 1982 (age 43–44); Denmark
- Genres: House
- Occupations: DJ; producer
- Instruments: Keyboards; mixer; synthesizer
- Years active: 1998 – present
- Labels: Cutbrook; Disco:wax; Copenhagen Records

Kenneth Alexander Nicolaisen (born 1982), known professionally as Alexander Brown, is a Danish DJ. He began his career at age 15 and has received four successive nominations for Best Danish DJ. He was part of the Ministry of Sound Tour.

In 2009, Brown formed a collaboration with record producer and DJ Morten Hampenberg, going on to release joint singles as Morten Hampenberg & Alexander Brown. Some of their recordings feature collaborations with other artists, including Yepha, Stine Bramsen, Casper Christensen, and Nabiha. They gained international fame with "Raise the Roof" featuring Fatman Scoop, Pitbull and Nabiha.

== Discography ==
=== EPs ===
| Year | Album | Peak position | Certification |
| Year | Album | DAN | Certification |
|---|---|---|---|
| 2013 | #Human | — | |
| 2014 | #X | — | |
"—" means no official placement in the charts.

=== Singles ===
| Year | Single | Peak position | Certification |
| Year | Single | DAN | Certification |
|---|---|---|---|
| 2011 | "Lift Off" (with Christian Amby) | 24 | |
| 2012 | "Tættere på" (feat. Siff) | 19 | |
| 2012 | "1.21 Gigawatts" | — | |
| 2012 | "Sidste gang" (feat. Szhirley) | — | |
| 2012 | "Black" | — | |
| 2013 | "Ingenting" (feat. Jon Century) | — | |
| 2013 | "Miss You" (feat. Camille Jones) | — | |
| 2013 | "Mind Distorted" (feat. The Storm) | — | |
| 2014 | "More more more" | — | |
| 2015 | "Down" (feat. Joe Forrest) | — | |
| 2015 | "Jack in a Box" (feat. Jack Savoretti) | — | |
| 2015 | "The Other Side of Love" (feat. Jack Savoretti) | — | |

== See also ==
- Morten Hampenberg & Alexander Brown
