= Come Again =

Come Again may refer to:

- Come Again (The Jaggerz album), 1975
- Come Again (Thornley album) or the title song, 2004
- "Come Again" (Dowland), a 16th-century song by John Dowland
- "Come Again (The Quetzal)", a 2012 song by Soluna Samay
- "Come Again", a song by Damn Yankees from Damn Yankees
- "Come Again", a song by Kurt Vile from Bottle It In
- "Come Again", a song by Staind from Tormented
- "Come Again", a song by Swizz Beatz from Poison
- "Come Again", a song by Gorillaz and Spacemonkeyz from Laika Come Home
- "Come Again", a song by Lily La Roux used for Cities: Skylines
- Derek and Clive Come Again, a 1977 album by Derek and Clive
- Come Again (novel), a 2020 novel by Robert Webb
