= Morten Hampenberg =

Danish music producer (born 1977)

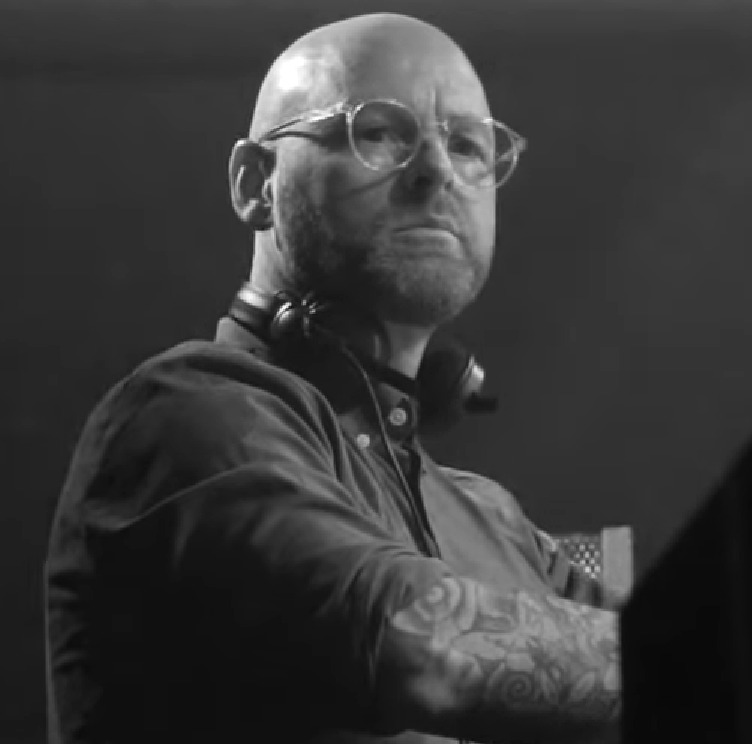
- Hampenberg in 2023

Background information
- Born: Morten Rask Hampenberg; January 14, 1977 (age 49); Denmark
- Origin: Denmark
- Genres: House
- Occupations: DJ and producer
- Instruments: Keyboards, Mixer, Synthesizer
- Years active: 1998 – present
- Label: Disco:wax

Morten Rask Hampenberg (born 14 January 1977) is a Danish music producer known for both his solo work and his cooperation with the musician Alexander Brown. In his early solo career, he only used his family name and was therefore known as Hampenberg until 2008. In 2009 he began using his full name both in his solo work and joint releases with Brown. He has also used the alias Moám, under which he co-produced Example's UK #2 hit "Say Nothing" and remixed "Stay Awake" and "Watch the Sun Come Up".

Hampenberg collaborates with Brown as Morten Hampenberg & Alexander Brown, a duo releasing joint singles. Some recordings have been collaborations with other artists, including Yepha, Stine Bramsen, Casper Christensen, and Nabiha. The group gained international fame with "Raise the Roof" featuring Fatman Scoop, Pitbull and Nabiha.

== Discography ==
=== Albums ===
Year	Album	Peak position	Certification
Year	Album	DAN	Certification
1999	Hampenberg	5	Platinum
2001	Duck Off	13	Gold
"—" means no official placement in the charts.

=== Singles ===
Year	Single	Peak position					Album
Year	Single	DAN	NED	NOR	SPA	UK	Album
1998	"Festival"	—	—	—	—	—	Hampenberg
1999	"Last Night"	—	—	—	—	—	Hampenberg
1999	"Grab That Thing "	1	—	7	—	—	Hampenberg
2000	"Dream Love" (featuring Ingun Løberg)	—	—	—	—	—	Hampenberg
2000	"With Some Class"	4	—	—	—	—	Hampenberg
2001	"Salsation"	8	—	—	—	—	Hampenberg
2001	"Ducktoy"	—	31	—	1	30	Duck Off
2002	"Listen Up"	—	—	—	—	—	Duck Off
2008	"Acid Disco Plastic Electro"	—	—	—	—	—	
2008	"Love in Siberia"	96	—	—	—	—	
2010	"Fuk U in the Ass"	—	—	—	—	—	
2012	"Glorious" (Hampenberg ft. Jesper Nohrstedt)	17	—	—	—	—	
2013	"Kiss Me" (ft. Gaia)	—	—	—	—	—	
2015	"Vi' helt væk" (with Yepha)	—	—	—	—	—	
2015	"Airport" (The Attic Sleepers vs. Morten Hampenberg)	—	—	—	—	—	
2015	"Baddest" (Hamp & Yeps feat. Neya)	—	—	—	—	—	
2016	"Åh nej" (with Yepha)	—	—	—	—	—	
"—" means no official placement in the charts.

=== Songwriting ===
- 2011: "Take Our Hearts" for Jesper Nohrstedt at the 2012 Dansk Melodi Grand Prix

== See also ==
- Morten Hampenberg & Alexander Brown
