= List of Russian singers =

This is a list of notable Russian singers that have entered the industry, currently working or have left the industry.

== A ==
- Oleg Anofriyev

== B ==
- Mia Boyka

== G ==
- Boris Grebenshchikov

== I ==
- Inna Zhelannaya

== K ==
- Nikolai Komyagin
- Konfuz

== L ==
- Lana (singer)
- Linda (singer)

== M ==
- Alisa Mon

== N ==
- n.A.T.o. (singer)
- Pierre Narcisse

== P ==
- Alla Pugacheva

== S ==
- Sabi (Russian singer)

== V ==
- Julia Volkova
- MC Vspyshkin

== Z ==
- Zemfira
