= Shaka Loveless =

Danish rapper and singer

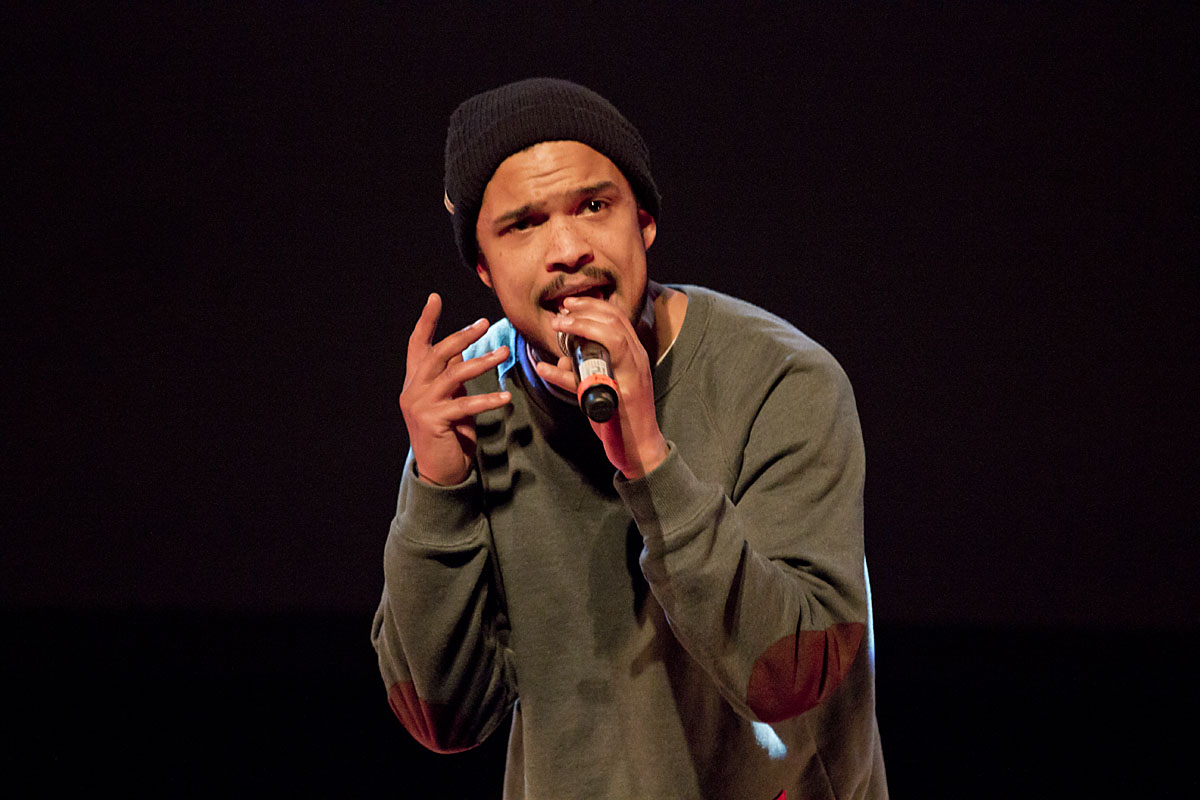
- Shaka Loveless

Background information
- Born: Shaka Loveless Grøn; 5 March 1984 (age 42); Aarhus, Denmark
- Genres: Rap, reggae, R&B
- Occupations: Singer, Songwriter
- Instrument: Vocals

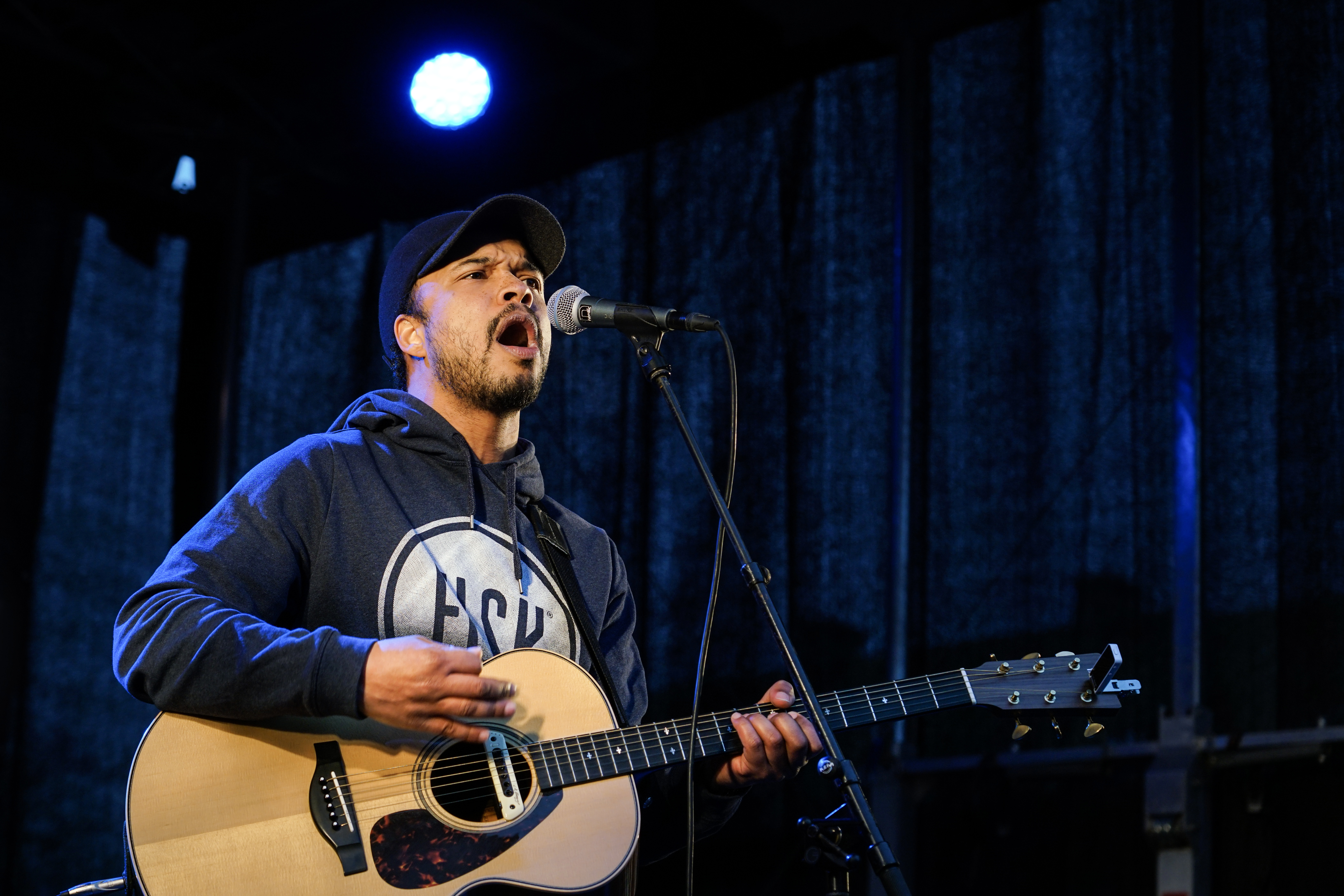
Shaka Loveless in Aarhus Denmark 2017

Shaka Loveless Grøn (born 5 March 1984) is a Danish rapper and singer with reggae roots. He is also a lead vocalist for the Danish hip-hop / R&B band The Gypsies (earlier known as The Electric Gypsies with a more rock-oriented sound).

Shaka Loveless is the son of famous blues player James Loveless and has been a regular part of the Danish blues scene, as a solo artist, and in his long collaboration as member of Shades of Blue, where he played with guitarist Uffe Steen, bassist Morten Brauner and drummer Claus Daugaard.

Besides being lead vocalist for The Gypsies, he has also developed a successful solo career with his 2012 charting hit "Tomgang" that rose to No. 1 on the Danish Singles Chart. The platinum selling single "Tomgang" is produced by Donkey Sound like the rest of his debut album which was released by Universal Music in October 2012.

== Discography ==
=== Albums ===
with The Gypsies

- 2007: One Hand Up
- 2009: For the Feeble Hearted

solo

Year	Album	Peak position DEN	Certification
2012	Shaka Loveless	4	
2014	Det vi sku' miste	2	
2015	Til vi ligger	5	

=== Singles ===
with The Gypsies

- 2007: "Underground"
- 2008: "Part of Me"
- 2009: "The Mirror"
- 2009: "American Girl"

Solo

Year	Single	Peak position DEN	Certification	Album
2012	"Tomgang"	1	Platinum	Shaka Loveless
2012	"Ikke mere tid"	3	Platinum	Shaka Loveless
2012	"Dans din idiot" (featuring UFO)	—		Shaka Loveless
2013	"Dengang du græd"	7		Det vi sku' miste
2014	"2 mod verden"	3		Det vi sku' miste
2015	"Helt fin dag"	—		Til vi ligger
2015	"Ud af mørket" (featuring Medina)	21		Til vi ligger
2015	"I nat er vi ladt" (featuring Simon Kvamm)	40		Til vi ligger

Featured in

Year	Single	Peak positions	Album
Year	Single	DEN	Album
2012	"Nede med koldskål" (Smag på P3 featuring Niklas, Klumben, Shaka Loveless, Mette Lax, Djämes Braun & Steggerbomben)	—	Non-album singles
2014	"Lille hjerte" (Ankerstjerne featuring Shaka Loveless)	3	Non-album singles
2016	"Mon ami" (Livid featuring Shaka Loveless)	8	Non-album singles
