= Soluna Samay =

Guatemalan singer based in Denmark (born 1990)

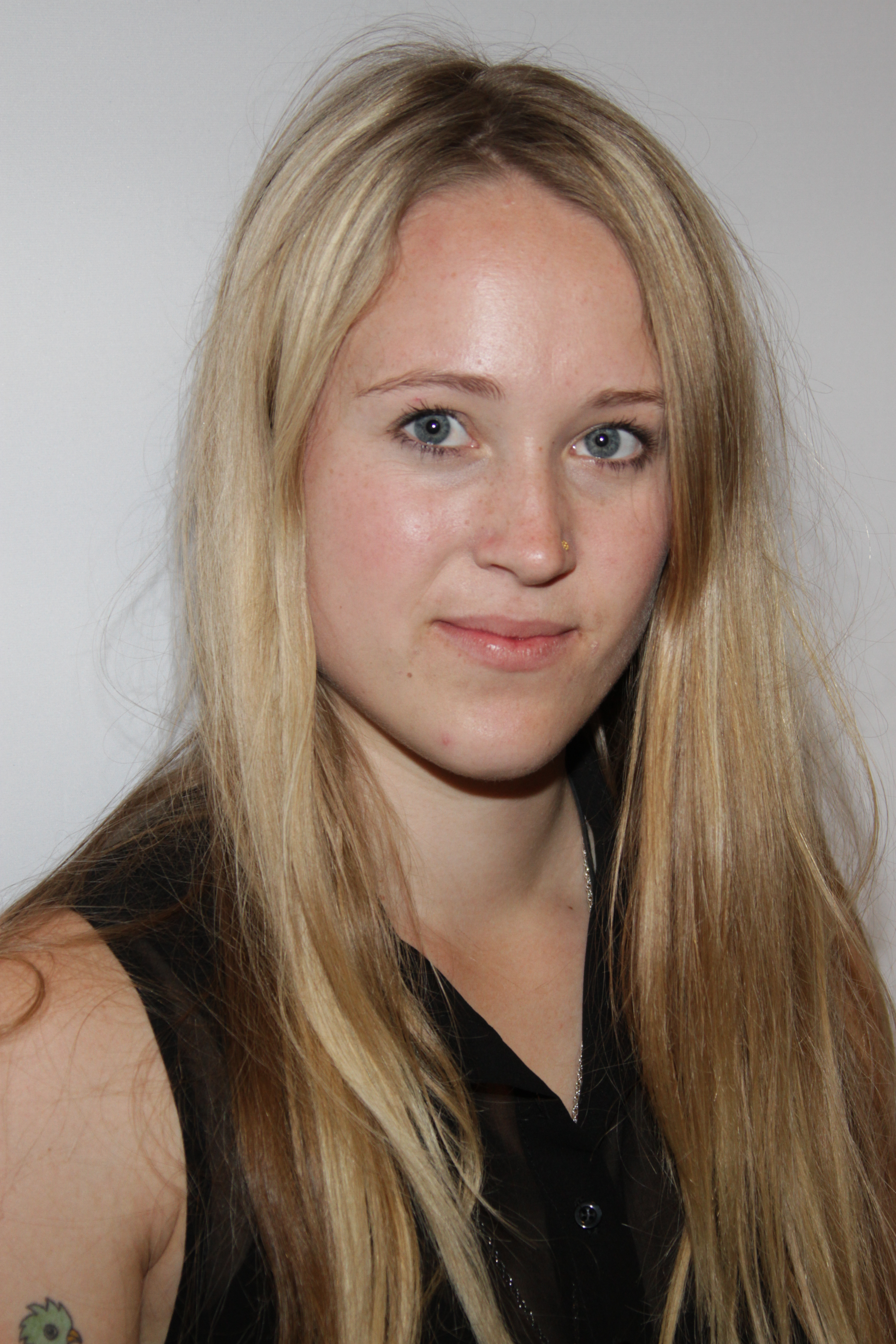

Background information
- Born: 27 August 1990 (age 35); Guatemala City, Guatemala
- Origin: Bornholm, Denmark
- Genres: Pop, rock, acoustic pop, acoustic rock, pop rock, soft rock, folk rock
- Years active: 2001–present
- Label: Baltic Records
- Website: solunasamay.com

Soluna Samay Kettel (born 27 August 1990, Guatemala City, Guatemala) is a Guatemalan-Danish singer of Swiss and German origin based in Denmark. Samay represented Denmark in the Eurovision Song Contest 2012 in Baku, Azerbaijan with her entry "Should've Known Better."

== Early life ==
Soluna Samay Kettel was born in Guatemala City, Guatemala to a German father, musician Gerd G. Kettel (stage name Gee Gee Kettel) and a Swiss mother, artist Annelis Ziegler. She grew up on the shores of Lago de Atitlán, Guatemala and attended the Robert Muller LIFE school. Soluna moved to Denmark in 2000 when her parents purchased a small farm on Bornholm, a Danish island in the Baltic Sea. Soluna is multilingual speaking fluent English, Danish, Spanish and German. Her name is derived from the Spanish words sol and luna, meaning Sun and Moon. Soluna has a Swiss passport, so, officially she is Swiss.

== Music career ==
Soluna's music career began aged 5 when she joined her father on drums and soon after began singing along. At the age of 10 she switched to electric bass, at 16 to upright bass. With her parents she spent her summers touring and playing music on the streets of Europe, and winters living in Guatemala. Soluna started to learn guitar around the age of 12, when she also wrote her first songs.

== National final and Eurovision 2012 ==
Soluna was chosen as a wildcard entry by DR1 for the Dansk Melodi Grand Prix (Danish Eurovision Song Contest), singing a song called "Should've Known Better" written by Remee, Isam B (Outlandish) and A Sulaiman and produced by Chief1. She won the Dansk Melodi Grand Prix 2012 on 21 January over Jesper Nohrstedt and Christian Brøns & Patrik Isaksson, and won the right to represent Denmark at the Eurovision Song Contest 2012.

Results from the voting of the Dansk Melodi Grand Prix 2012

#	Artist	Song	Norway	Russia	Germany	Azerbaijan	Denmark	Televoting	Total
01	Soluna Samay	"Should've Known Better"	10	10	10	12	12	56	110
02	Jesper Nohrstedt	"Take Our Hearts"	12	12	12	10	10	46	102
03	Christian Brøns & Patrik Isaksson	"Venter"	8	8	8	8	8	48	88

The song performed 13th in the first semi-final and finished 9th to qualify for the Eurovision final where she finished 23rd.

== Debut album ==
Soluna recorded her debut album "Sing Out Loud" over a two-year period, produced by Jesper Mejlvang and Michael Friis. It was released by Baltic Records on 23 September 2011.

== Discography ==
=== Gee Gee & Soluna ===
- The Beat Goes On (Ozella Music; 2001)
- Thinking Of You (Ozella Music; 2004)
- Movin’ On (Chocolate Factory; 2006)
- Lucky Seven (Funky Farm Records; 2007)
- Just Passing Through (Chocolate Factory; 2008)
- Streetwise (Funky Farm; 2009)
- The Best & the Rest (Chocolate Factory; 2011)

=== Soluna Samay ===
==== Albums ====
Title	Album details
Sing Out Loud	Released: 23 April 2012; Label: ArtPeople, Baltic Records; Formats: CD, digital download
Soluna Samay	Released: 17 June 2013; Label: RE:A:CH, Sony Music; Formats: CD, digital download
Golden	Released: 23 September 2016; Label: Gateway Music; Formats: CD, digital download

==== Singles ====
Year	Title	Peak chart positions				Album
Year	Title	DEN	AUT	GER	SWI	Album
2003	"I Wish I Was a Seagull"	—	—	—	—	Non-album single
2011	"Two Seconds Ago"	—	—	—	—	Sing Out Loud
2011	"Should've Known Better"	1	51	51	67	Soluna Samay
2012	"Come Again (The Quetzal)"	18	—	—	—	Soluna Samay
2012	"Humble"	—	—	—	—	Soluna Samay
2013	"L.O.V.E (If Women Ruled the World)"	—	—	—	—	Soluna Samay

Preceded by A Friend in London with "New Tomorrow"	Denmark in the Eurovision Song Contest; 2012	Succeeded by Emmelie de Forest with "Only Teardrops"
