= Shaka Loveless (album) =

Studio album by Shaka Loveless
- Released: 1 September 2012
- Label: Universal Music Denmark

Singles from Shaka Loveless
- 1. "Tomgang" Released: 2012; 2. "Ikke mere tid" Released: 2012; 3. "Dans din idiot" Released: 2012

Shaka Loveless is the self-titled debut solo album of Danish artist Shaka Loveless recorded in Food Palace Studios and released on 1 September 2012 on Universal Music label.

== Track listing ==
No.	Title	Writer(s)	Length
1.	"Kom for at gå (featuring Pharfar)"	Andreas Keilgaard, Shaka. Loveless, Søren Schou	3:59
2.	"Tomgang"	Keilgaard, Loveless, Schou	3:39
3.	"Gør din ting"	Keilgaard, Loveless, Schou	3:24
4.	"Alting forvandlet"	Keilgaard, Loveless, Schou	3:50
5.	"Græder for mit kvarter (featuring Wafande)"	Keilgaard, Loveless, Schou, Wafande Jolivel	3:15
6.	"Ikke mere tid"	Keilgaard, Loveless, Schou	3:39
7.	"Kommer over det"	Keilgaard, Loveless, Schou	3:35
8.	"Ingenting"	Keilgaard, Loveless, Schou	3:55
9.	"Hvad kan vi bruge det til"	Keilgaard, Loveless, Schou	3:25
10.	"Dans din idiot (featuring UFO)"	Keilgaard, Kristian Humaidan, Loveless, Schou	3:05
11.	"Herfra hvor vi står (featuring Peter Sommer)"	Niels Skousen	6:45

== Personnel ==
- Christian Møller – A&R(2)
- Björn Engelmann – mastering
- Morten Karlkvist – radio
- Tomace – cover photography
- Donkey Sound – producers
- Shaka Loveless – vocals and instruments
- Fresh-I, Pharfar – additional vocals and instruments

Musicians

- Mads Krabbe – bass
- Carl-Erik Riestra – bass
- Lasse Boman – guitar
- Tormod Holm – guitar
- Zigge Kreutzmann – guitar
- Anders Thykier – percussions
- Lars Hartvig – saxophone
- Jakob Johansen – trombone, trumpet
- Helianne Blais – violin

== Charts ==
Chart (2012)	Peak position
Danish Albums Chart	4
