= The Whistle Song =

The Whistle Song may refer to:

- "The Whistle Song" (DJ Aligator Project song), 2000
- "There It Go (The Whistle Song)", 2005
- "The Whistle Song", a 1991 song by Frankie Knuckles
- "The Whistle Song", a song by Netsky from 2, 2012
