= Jesper Nohrstedt =

Danish singer

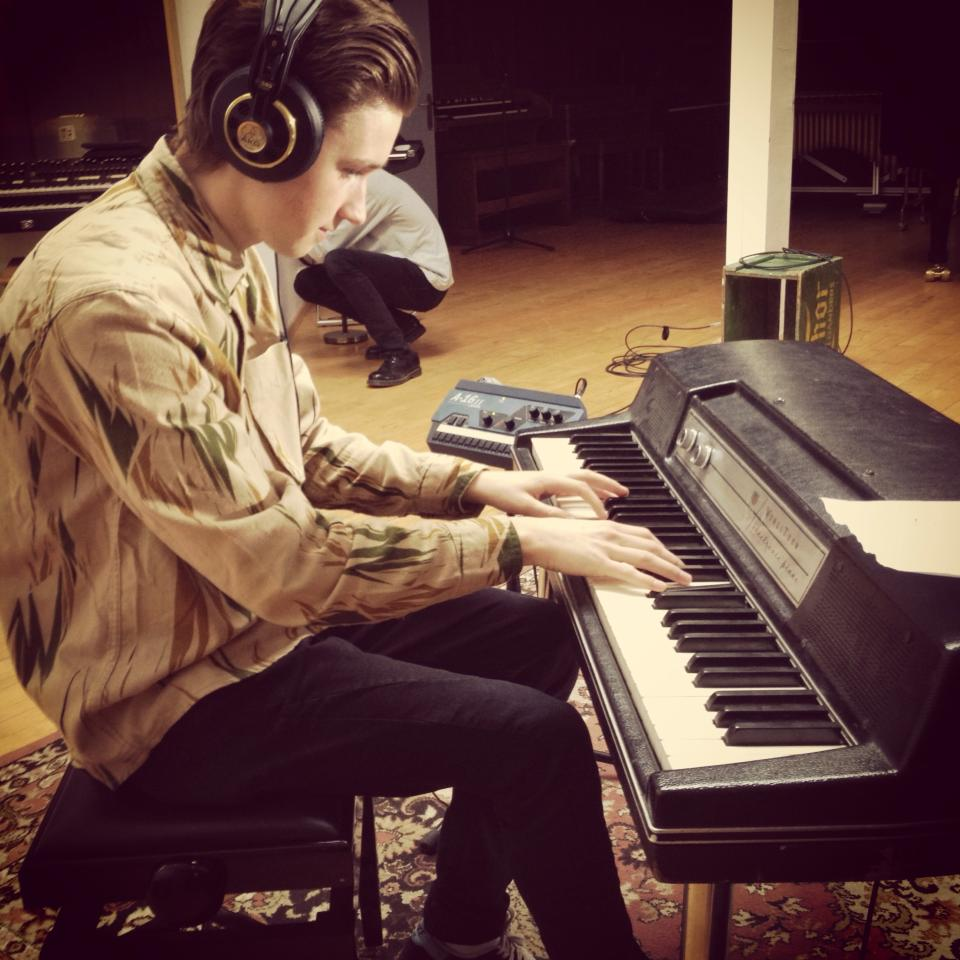
- Nohrstedt in 2013

Background information
- Born: Jesper Nohrstedt Boesgaard; 20 September 1994 (age 31); Denmark
- Genres: Pop, House music
- Occupations: Singer, songwriter, musician
- Instruments: Vocals, guitar
- Years active: 2010–present
- Label: Disco:wax

Jesper Nohrstedt Boesgaard (born 20 September 1994) is a Danish singer. He made his debut on the Danish X Factor in 2010. Two years later he reached second place in the music contest Dansk Melodi Grand Prix; had he won, he would have represented Denmark in the Eurovision Song Contest 2012. He is currently making music with Danish producer and DJ Morten Hampenberg.

== Beginnings ==
Jesper was born on Amager island, but grew up in Taastrup, near Copenhagen where he lived with his Danish father Carsten, Swedish mother Gudrun and sisters Linn and Fie.

== Danish X Factor (2010) ==
At the age of 16, while a student, he took part in Season 3 of the Danish X Factor in 2010 reaching the Final 3 before being eliminated in the final coming third overall behind Thomas Ring Petersen and runner-up Tine Madsen.

== Performances during X Factor ==
| Episode | Theme | Song | Artist | Result |
|---|---|---|---|---|
| Audition | Free Choice | "A Message" | Coldplay | Through to superbootcamp |
| Superbootcamp | Free Choice | "One" | U2 | Through to bootcamp (day 1) |
| Bootcamp (day 1) | Free Choice | "Blackbird" | The Beatles | Through to bootcamp (day 2) |
| Bootcamp (day 2) | Free Choice | "Life in Technicolor II" | Coldplay | Through to live shows |
| Live show 1 | Free Choice | "Uprising" | Muse | Safe |
| Live show 2 | Michael Jackson | "Say Say Say" | Paul McCartney feat. Michael Jackson | Safe |
| Live show 3 | Rock | "Dry Lips" | Dúné | Safe |
| Live show 4 | UK Number Ones | "Fireflies" | Owl City | Safe |
| Live show 5 | James Bond Associated Of DR Big Band | "A View to a Kill" | Duran Duran | Bottom two |
| Live show 6 – Semi-final | Gasolin | "Kvinde min" | Gasolin | Safe |
| Live show 6 – Semi-final | Viewers Choice | "Speed of Sound" | Coldplay | Safe |
| Live show 7 – Final | Free choice | "Born to Be Wild" | Steppenwolf | 3rd Place |
| Live show 7 – Final | Duet with guest artist | "Let Go Of Your Love" with Dúné | Dúné | 3rd Place |

== Dansk Melodi Grand Prix (2012) ==
In 2012, he participated in Dansk Melodi Grand Prix 2012 with the song "Take Our Hearts", written by Mads B. B. Krog, Engelina Larsen and Morten Hampenberg. He reached the Superfinal (final three) with the song at the Dansk Melodi Grand Prix 2012 for a bid to represent Denmark at the Eurovision Song Contest 2012 and finished runner-up behind the winning song "Should've Known Better" by Soluna Samay.

Dansk Melodi Grand Prix Superfinal

| Place | Artist | Song | Norway | Russia | Germany | Azerbaijan | Danish jury | SMS voting | Total points |
|---|---|---|---|---|---|---|---|---|---|
| 1 | Soluna Samay | "Should've Known Better" | 10 | 10 | 10 | 12 | 12 | 56 | 110 |
| 2 | Jesper Nohrstedt | "Take Our Hearts" | 12 | 12 | 12 | 10 | 10 | 46 | 102 |
| 3 | Christian Brøns & Patrik Isaksson | "Venter" | 8 | 8 | 8 | 8 | 8 | 48 | 88 |

Despite not winning in his bid to represent Denmark in the Eurovision Song Contest, Jesper's song proved very popular and charted at No. 4 immediately after the final.

== Discography ==
=== Singles ===
| Year | Song | Peak | | Certification | Album |
| Year | Song | DK | NO | Certification | Album |
|---|---|---|---|---|---|
| 2012 | "Take Our Hearts" | 4 | 21 | | Non-album release |

Featured in

| Year | Song | Peak | Certification | Album |
| Year | Song | DK | Certification | Album |
|---|---|---|---|---|
| 2012 | "Glorious" (Hampenberg feat. Jesper Nohrstedt) | 17 | | Non-album release |
