= Yepha =

Danish singer and rapper (born 1983)

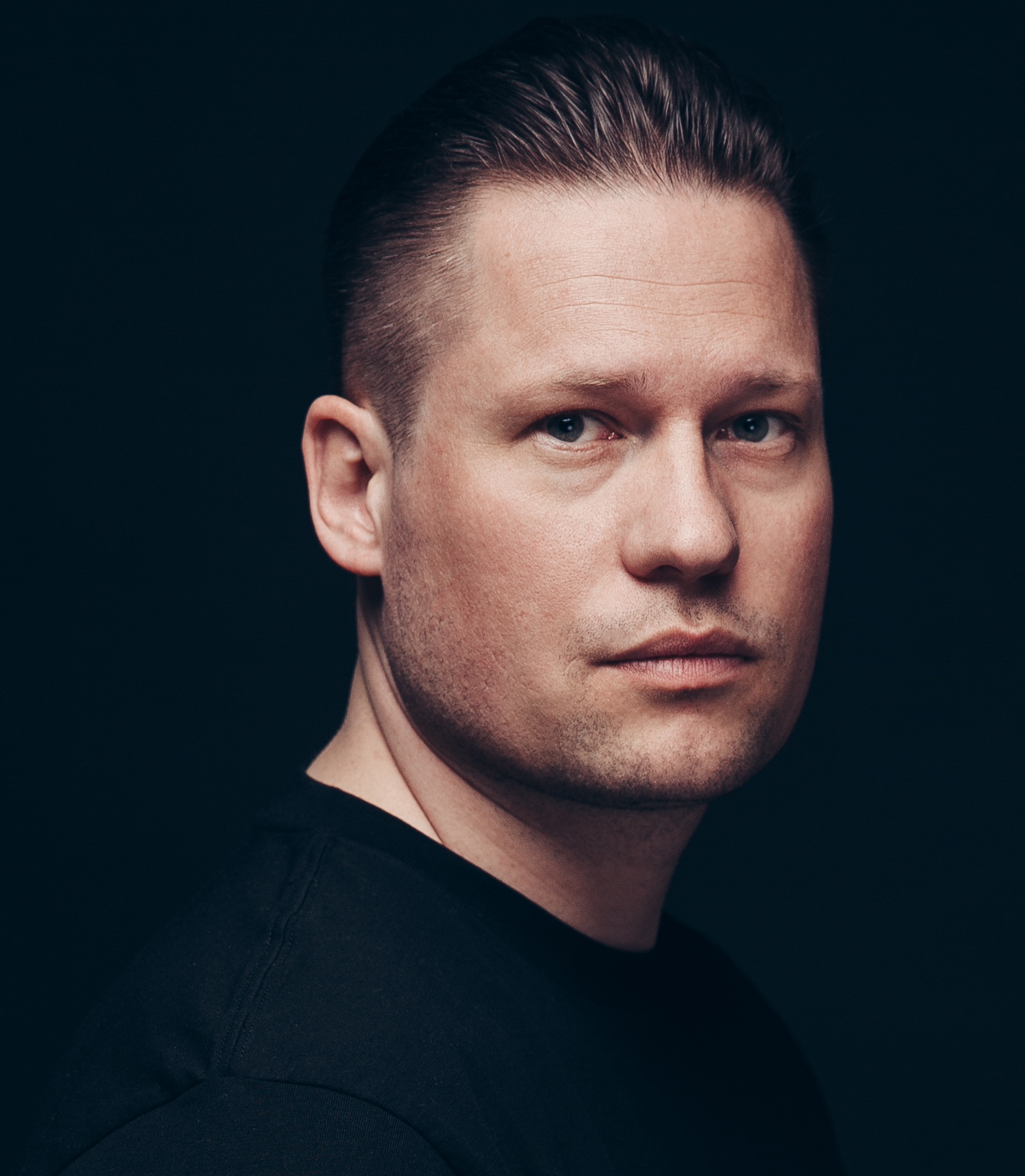
- Yepha in 2019

Background information
- Born: Jeppe Bruun Wahlstrøm; 1983 (age 42–43); Denmark
- Genres: Rap, Urban music, Danish pop
- Occupations: Singer, songwriter, rapper, musician
- Years active: 2001 – 2011 (as UFO Yepha); 2011 – present (as solo)

Jeppe Bruun Wahlstrøm (born 1983 in Denmark) better known by his stage name Yepha, is a Danish, singer, rapper and hip hop artist. He was part of the rap duo UFO Yepha. After they split up, UFO and Yepha both went solo.

== 2002–2011: with UFO Yepha ==
Kristian Humaidan (known as UFO) won the freestyle championship MC's Fight Night in 2002. Soon he started collaborating as a duo with Yepha through Svendborg, and later from Aarhus. They were also known as Whyyou (taking lead from first letters of their names). They had a good number of chart successes before they split up as a duo in 2011.

They had three albums charting on the official Danish Albums Chart as follows: U vs. Y (2003 – reached #28), Ingen som os (2006 – reached #20) and Kig mig i øjnene (2008 – reached #32). They released many singles as UFO Yepha including charting singles "Hver dag" (2003, reached #1), "Næh næh" (Ufo Yepha feat. Anna David) (2008 – reached #20) and "Stille og roligt knald pa" (2009, reached #27)

== 2011– : solo career ==
While part of UFO Yepha, Yepha had collaborated with Morten Hampenberg & Alexander Brown, a collaboration that continued as a solo artist with the release of "Det stikker helt af" and "Klovn".

In 2012, Yepha released his single "Det går ned" that featured Niklas.

== Discography ==
(For discography as a duo, see UFO Yepha discography)

=== Singles ===
Year	Single	Peak position	Certification
Year	Single	DEN	Certification
2012	"Det går ned" (Yepha feat. Niklas)	31	
2012	"Ik' gør' det"	17	

Featured in

Year	Single	Peak position	Certification
Year	Single	DEN	Certification
2009	"Skub til taget" (Morten Hampenberg & Alexander Brown featuring Yepha)	3	DEN: Gold
2011	"Det stikker helt af" (Morten Hampenberg & Alexander Brown featuring Yepha)	6	DEN: Gold
2011	"Klovn" (Morten Hampenberg & Alexander Brown featuring Yepha & Casper Christensen)	5	DEN: Gold
