= The Gypsies (Danish band) =

Danish hip hop and R&B band

- Genres: Hip hop / R&B
- Years active: 2000 – present
- Labels: Superstar Records
- Members: Shaka Loveless; Benjamin Kissi; Lasse Boman; Peter Blonde; Andrew Hagedorn; Birk Nevel

The Gypsies are a Danish hip-hop / R&B band with a live sound instead of using backing tracks or turntables. The band's sound is characterized by vocalists Shaka Loveless and Benjamin Kissi. The other members are: Lasse Boman (guitar), Peter Blonde (bass), Andrew Hagedorn (keyboards) and Birk Nevel (drums). The band began before the 2000s as The Electric Gypsies with a more rock-oriented sound. With the addition of Benjamin Kissi, the group moved to a more urban sound and a consequent change of name to The Gypsies.

In addition to being regular backing band for Danish names like Jokeren and Outlandish, they have also opened for The Roots and Fugees for their Danish concerts.

In 2007, The Gypsies released their debut album, One Hand Up on Superstar Records label. The video for the single "Part of Me" from the album was released on 18 January 2008. The follow-up second album was For the Feeble Hearted in 2009.

== Other projects ==
- Band members Lasse Boman, Shaka Loveless, Benjamin Kissi and Birk Nevel also play in the side project Are We Brothers?
- Lead vocalist Shaka Loveless is also a solo singer with reggae roots. He is the son of famous blues player James Loveless. He has been a regular part of the Danish blues scene, in particular with his long collaboration as member of Shades of Blue, where he played with guitarist Uffe Steen, bassist Morten Brauner and drummer Claus Daugaard. He is also developing a solo career with his single "Tomgang" reaching #1 in the Danish Singles Chart.

== Discography ==
=== Albums ===
- 2007: One Hand Up
- 2009: For the Feeble Hearted

=== Singles ===
- 2008: "Part of Me"
