= Come Again (The Quetzal) =

Single by Soluna Samay
- Released: June 15, 2012
- Recorded: 2012
- Genre: Pop
- Length: 3:31
- Label: RE:A:CH; Sony Music Entertainment
- Songwriter(s): Isam Bachiri, Bjørn Banke, Lars Pedersen, Remee, Soluna Samay

Soluna Samay singles chronology
"Should've Known Better" (2012)	"Come Again (The Quetzal)" (2012)	"Humble" (2012)

"Come Again (The Quetzal)" is a single by Danish singer Soluna Samay. It was released as a Digital download in Denmark on June 15, 2012. The song entered the Danish Singles Chart at number 18.

== Live performances ==
On June 18, 2012 she performed the song live on Aftenshowet.

== Track listing ==
Digital download
No.	Title	Length
1.	"Come Again (The Quetzal)"	3:31

== Chart performance ==
Chart (2012)	Peak position
Denmark (Tracklisten)	18

== Release history ==
Region	Date	Format	Label
Denmark	June 15, 2012	Digital download	RE:A:CH, Sony Music Entertainment
