= SIFF =

SIFF may refer to:

== Film festivals ==
- Seattle International Film Festival, established 1976
- Sedona International Film Festival, established 1994
- Shanghai International Film Festival, established 1993
- Singapore International Film Festival, established 1987
- Sofia International Film Festival, established 1997
- Sonoma International Film Festival, established 1997

== Other uses ==
- Save Indian Family Foundation, a men's rights organization in India

== See also ==
- Siff, surname
