= Lana (singer) =

Russian K-pop singer

- Лана
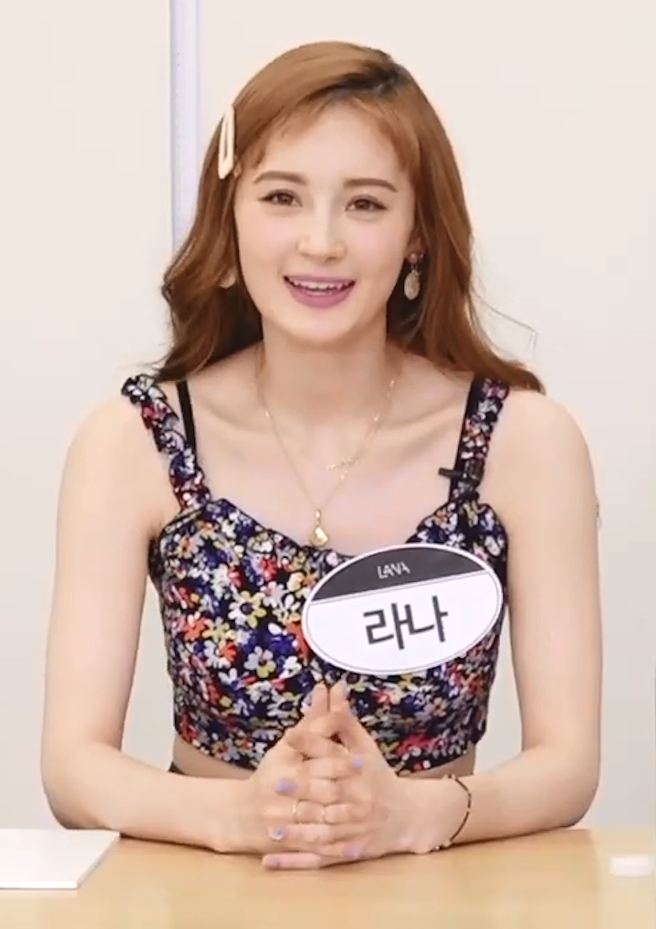
- Lana in February 2020
- Born: Eugina Svetlana; 23 November 1996 (age 29); Poronaysk, Sakhalin, Russia
- Occupation: Singer
- Years active: 2019–present

Svetlana Dmitriyevna Yudina (Russian: Светлана Дмитриевна Юдина; born 23 November 1996), better known by her stage name Lana (Лана), is a Russian singer based in South Korea. In June 2019, she debuted as the first Russian K-pop idol with the single "Take The Wheel".

== Early life ==
Lana was born and raised in the city of Poronaysk, in the Russian Far East region of Sakhalin Oblast. Her father is half Tatar. Lana aspired to become a singer from a young age. After watching the drama manga series Boys Over Flowers, she found the language and pronunciation "beautiful," and after initially studying the language, she travelled to South Korea following her high school graduation in 2014. She studied political science and diplomacy at Sungkyunkwan University in Seoul and worked briefly as a model.

== Career ==
=== 2017–present: Television appearances and solo debut ===
On 5 June 2017, Lana made an appearance on episode of the television program Abnormal Summit, where she appeared as a guest representing Russia. Following this, on 28 September, Lana was the guest host on three episodes of the television program Welcome, First Time in Korea?, where she invited three friends from Sakhalin to spend a vacation in South Korea. She also appeared on the television competition show, South Korean Foreigners. In an interview with Sports Seoul in August 2018, Lana revealed that she stopped all media appearances because she had been a trainee at Thought Entertainment since 2016 and, since February 2018, had been preparing for a solo debut with the goal of debuting in the winter. However, her debut was cancelled without prior notice, and Lana later left Thought Entertainment and joined a new agency, HiCC Entertainment. In 2-019, she appeared on the television show Problematic Men.

On 4 January 2019, she starred in the music video for the song "Face Time" by South Korean singer J Cat. She officially debuted as a solo artist on 27 June 2019, with the digital single "Take The Wheel". It is a 90s inspired "upbeat summery song" with about losing your inhibitions. The accompanying music video featured neon lights and all-white outfits reminiscent of 90s boy bands. On 10 December 2019, Lana released the music video for her second single, "Make It Real," without prior announcement. The single, which was released on digital music platforms on the 16th of December.

On 11 March, Lana revealed that she would be a contestant on the Chinese reality show Produce Camp 2020, under Bates MeThinks Entertainment. On 18 October, Lana debuted in the Chinese market with the digital single "Talk Talk". Later, Lana competed in the new survival show Bravo Youngsters!.

== Discography ==
=== Singles ===
Song	Year	Album
"Take the Wheel"	2019	Non-album singles
"Make It Real"	2019	Non-album singles
"Talk Talk"	2020	Non-album singles

=== Compositions ===
Song	Year	Album	Artist(s)	Composition		Ref.
Song	Year	Album	Artist(s)	Credit	With	Ref.
"Take the Wheel"	2019	No album	Herself	Yes	Andreas Öhrn, Didrik Thott, Jazelle Rodriguez, Sam (DJ Sam F) Fishman	
"Make It Real"	2019	No album	Herself	Yes	Iki, Ondo	

== Filmography ==
=== Variety shows ===
Title	Year	Notes
Abnormal Summit	2017	Guest representing Russia
Welcome, First Time in Korea?	2017	Guest presenter
Problematic Man	2019	Special appearance
Video Star	2020	Special appearance

=== Reality shows ===
Year	Title	Channel
Produce Camp 2020	2020	Contestant
Bravo Youngsters!	2020–2021	Contestant
Eden (Season 2)	2022	Contestant

== See also ==
- List of K-pop artists
- List of Russian singers
