= How Not to Be a Boy =

2017 book by Robert Webb

- Front cover
- Author: Robert Webb
- Subject: Memoir
- Publisher: Canongate Books
- Publication date: 29 August 2017
- Publication place: United Kingdom
- Award: Chortle Award
- ISBN: 9781786890085

How Not to Be a Boy is a 2017 memoir by the British comedian Robert Webb. He writes about his childhood, parenthood and other life events, using the experiences to discuss masculinity, gender roles and feminist topics. Major life events include his mother's death from cancer, his attendance at the University of Cambridge and the births of his two daughters.

The book arose after Webb wrote a New Statesman article of the same name. It was also part of a two-book deal with Canongate Books, with the second book being Come Again (2020). How Not to Be a Boy was listed on The Sunday Times's Bestseller List for eight weeks and received a Chortle Award and positive critical reception. Reviewers found the book more serious than comedic and praised its messaging.

== Background ==
The British comedian Robert Webb wrote an article entitled "How Not to Be a Boy" for the New Statesman in 2014, in which he discussed his mother's death and his relationship to his father's view of masculinity. He found that a good way to write about masculinity was through the lens of his early life. In 2015, he announced that he was working on a memoir which would expand upon parts of the column. He had made a deal with Canongate Books to write two books, the latter of which became the novel Come Again (2020). A brief idea he had for a book was a comedic analysis of lad culture topics such as men's magazines and the motoring programme Top Gear, but he abandoned this idea. He read Caitlin Moran's How to Be a Woman (2011), a memoir about adolescence and gender roles, and was inspired by the idea of an equivalent about men.

Events in Webb's life are presented out of order. He aimed to present events to make connections between events that had happened to him and ways this affected his behaviour. According to an interview in The Scotsman, he found that all of his poor life decisions were made "because I was trying to be a boy, or because I was trying to be a man". He said on Twitter that one guiding thought while writing was how he could hypothetically explain the ideas about masculinity to Bill Turnbull, a BBC morning news presenter. He was told by his agent at one point to make the book "15 per cent funnier".

Talking with Radio Times, Webb said that he found it difficult to write about his mother's death and the months that followed, but that he also found "something cathartic" in "being able to go back and frame those experiences in your own way", and that it gave an "illusion of control". In an interview with The Irish Times, Webb said he felt "a protectiveness" towards the reader while writing, as he had personally had many years to get used to the idea of his mother's early death, and didn't want to "drop these bombshells here and there on the reader without a sense of decorum".

External videos
- "'I've settled at the disappointing end of clever...'" Webb quotes from the book and discusses it.
- "Peep Show star Robert Webb: don't say 'man up'" Webb discusses the book on Channel 4 News.

The book was published on 29 August 2017. During that month, the book was a BBC Radio 4 Book of the Week, read by Webb and adapted to avoid profanity. Webb also appeared on Channel 4 News for an interview. While doing book signings to promote the event, Webb found that the most difficult questions to address were by parents who were interested in talking to their sons about gender, and by people who wanted to know about whether differences between men and women could be attributed to biology. He saw himself as not an expert on these topics, though he recommended Cordelia Fine's work on the latter.

== Synopsis ==
Webb had two older brothers, and a third older brother who died in infancy. Webb describes himself as nerdy, with interests including comedy and Star Wars. He analyses gender conditioning in the playground among young children, as well as homophobia among boys. His father was a woodcutter who drank heavily and often acted with anger towards his children and wife. Webb's parents separated and he lived with his mother, who remarried and had a daughter.

Webb's mother died of breast cancer when he was aged 17. The last thing he spoke to her about was his concerns over still being a virgin. The afternoon after her funeral, he attended a university fair. He moved to live with his father and prepared to sit his A-levels a second time. Two months after her death, the night before an exam, he considered overdosing on painkillers. Following his exams, he attended Robinson College, Cambridge. He became vice-president of the Footlights, a student comedy group, where he met his comedy duo partner David Mitchell. At university, Webb says that he became self-centred. He also attended therapy during this period, three years subsequent to his mother's death. In his love life, he experienced sexual attraction to both men and women.

Webb formed a relationship with Abigail Burdess, whom he met on a radio show. They married and had two children. As he became a father, Webb increased his rate of voiceover work and developed a dependency on alcohol and smoking. He withdrew emotionally from his wife and children, until she confronted him. Following this, he attempted to change and increased the parenting responsibilities he took on, reduced the amount he was working and confided in people with his emotions rather than repressing them. He and his wife refer to patriarchy as "The Trick", due to one of their daughters' mispronunciation of the term, and explain to their two daughters that it refers to societal pressures and gender inequality that exist in the world they live in.

== Reception ==
How Not to Be a Boy entered The Sunday Times's Bestseller List on 10 September 2017, in the number one position. It remained in the top ten for six weeks, accruing 24,000 books sold by 14 October, according to Nielsen BookScan. It re-entered the chart for two weeks in 2018. It won the Chortle Award, given for British comedy, in the 2018 book category. Journalists for The Observer listed it as one of "Thirty books to help us understand the world in 2020", crediting Webb with beginning a trend of memoirs about masculinity.

The Times's Francesca Angelini believed that the "strongest part is the straightforward coming-of-age memoir", saying that the ideas in the book were "not new" but were "convincing". Other than the descriptions of Webb's freshers' week and relationship with his father, Angelini did not find it particularly comedic. She criticised that he "skirts over his homosexual relationships without explaining why". Steve Bennett of Chortle found the book to be "thought-provoking personal insight" on the topic of toxic masculinity. Bennett made criticisms similar to Angelini, in that he thought the book could have been funnier, though the writing was "witty", and that Webb "doesn't quite seem to know" the meaning of his attraction to men.

Fiona Sturges of The Guardian reviewed the book positively, summarising it as "a highly personal story that might just resonate with others and give them confidence to talk". Sturges found that Webb's account of his early life is "vividly drawn and very funny" and praised that "he never loses sight of his privilege as a man". Writing for the New Statesman, Frank Cottrell-Boyce lauded it as "a terrific book about how ... family can be the crucible in which tolerance and understanding are forged". Cottrell-Boyce praised the "affectionate, insightful" recollection of Webb's early life, the "hilariously precise" account of social mobility and the "grace and gratitude" in the descriptions of figures in the book, along with its humour.
