= Niklas (singer) =

Danish singer

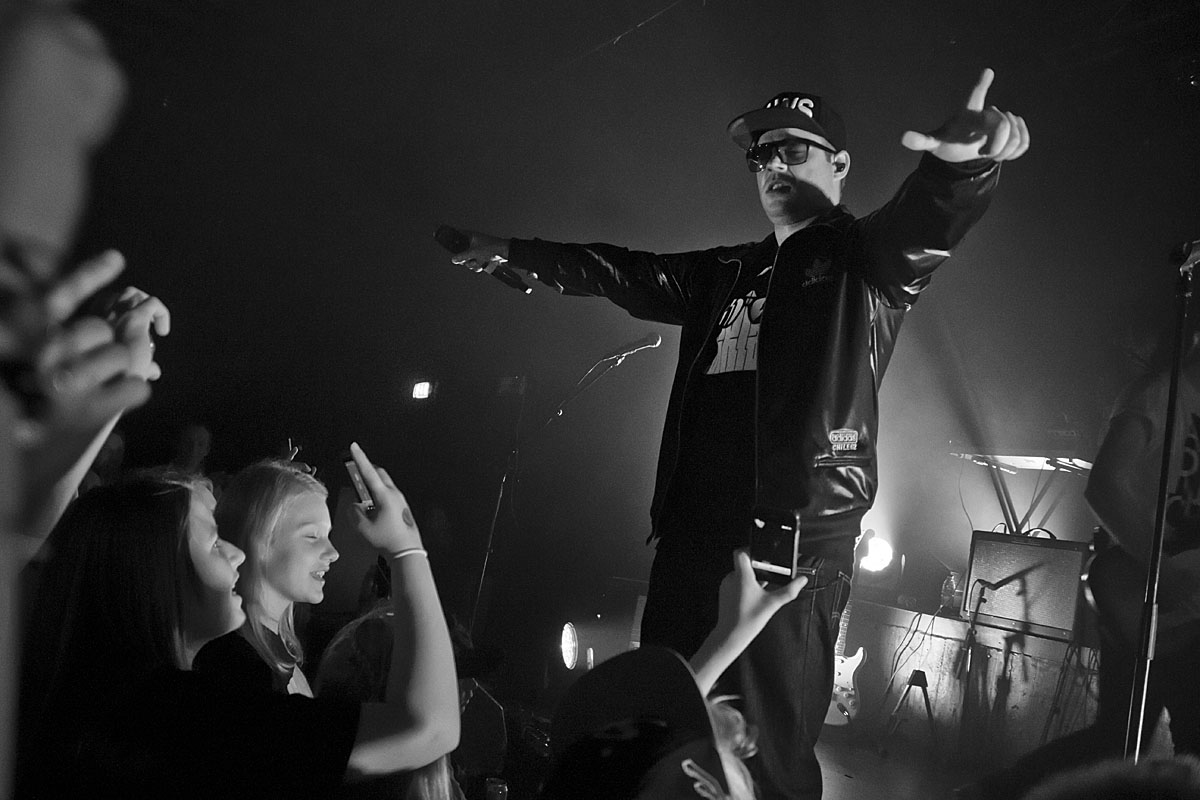
- Niklas in 2012

Background information
- Born: 16 September 1983 (age 43); Denmark
- Occupations: Singer, songwriter, rapper
- Years active: 2008–present
- Labels: Sony Music, Warner Music Group
- Website: www.niklasofficial.dk

Niklas (born 16 September 1983) is a Danish singer songwriter. He was born in Copenhagen, Denmark, but until he was 13 he lived in Sweden. He became famous with his YouTube renditions "Ingen dikkedarer" in 2010 and "Chiller, når du flexer" in 2011. He was signed to Sony Music and released his first official single "Ikke mer' mig (Niklas f*** dig)" in Sweden and Denmark and is preparing EP1 (on Instant Major record label)

== Discography ==
=== Singles ===
Year	Single	Peak chart positions	Album
Year	Single	DEN	Album
2011	"Ikke mer' mig (Niklas f*** dig)"	10	
2011	"Top Swag"	19	
2011	"Ingen Dikkerdarer"	40	
2012	"Veninder"	30	
2017	"Follow Me"	25	

Featured in

Year	Single	Peak chart positions	Album
Year	Single	DEN	Album
2011	"Det går ned" (Yepha feat. Niklas)	10	
2012	"Nede med koldskål" (Klumben feat. Niklas, Shaka Loveless, Mette Lax, Djämes Braun & Steggerbomben)	–	
