= Klumben =

Danish dancehall / hip hop / reggae act

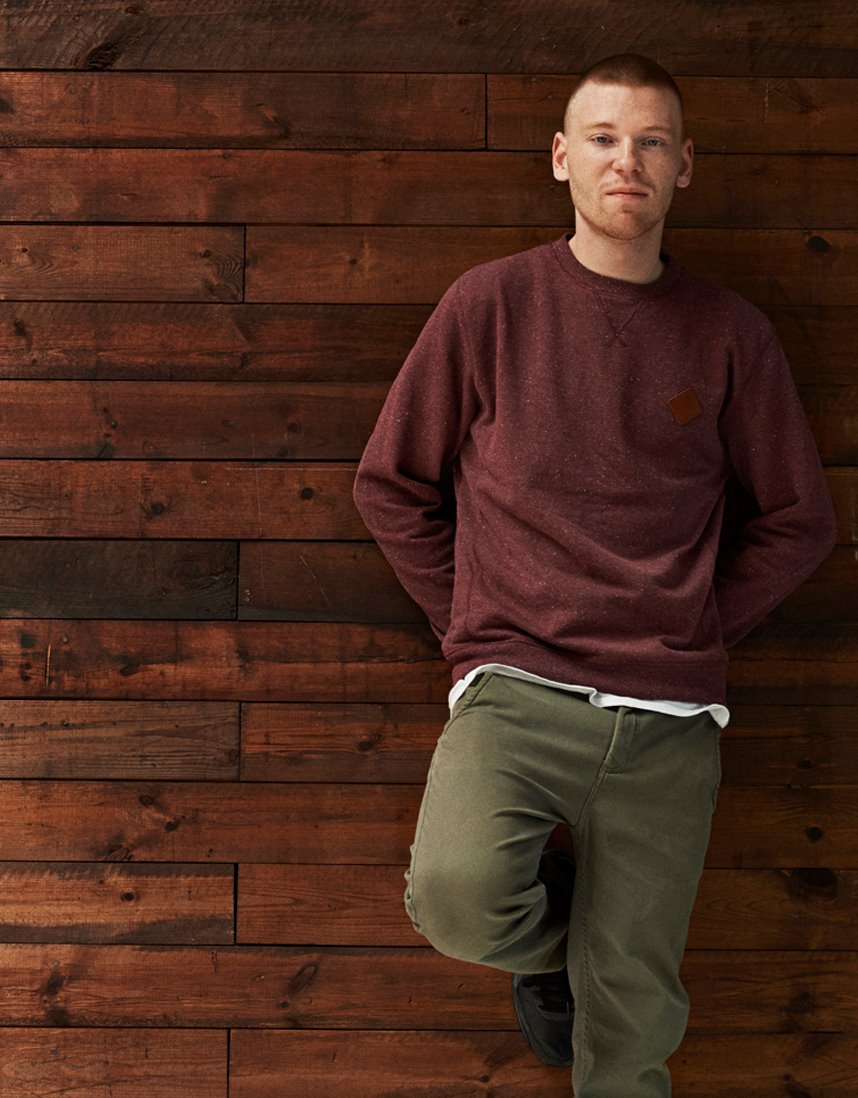

Background information
- Born: Christian Andersen; 27 November 1987 (age 38); Denmark
- Genre: Dancehall
- Occupation: Rapper
- Instrument: Vocals
- Label: Cheff Records

Christian Andersen (born 27 November 1987) better known as Klumben is a Copenhagen-based Danish dancehall / hip hop / reggae act. Christian grew up in a little town called Vemmelev.

Klumben's 2010 song "Kriminel" helped the artist gain popularity as a dancehall performer in Denmark.

He released his debut album Fra Klumben til pladen on Cheff Records / ArtPeople in May 2012 that reached No. 11 in the Danish Albums Chart.

== Discography ==
=== Albums ===
Year	Album	Peak position DEN
2012	Fra Klumben til pladen	11
2019	Livet (with Raske Penge)	11
2026	Førevigt (with Raske Penge)	32

=== Singles ===
Year	Single	Peak position DEN	Album
2011	"Du en lort" / "Dancehall Stickup" (credited to TopGunn & Klumben)	–	
2012	"Hobby"	–	Fra Klumben til pladen
2012	"Faxe kondi" (feat. Raske Penge)	4	Fra Klumben til pladen
2013	"Mit hjerte"	25	

Collaborations

Year	Single	Peak positions	Album
Year	Single	DEN	Album
2012	"Nede med koldskål" (Klumben feat. Niklas, Shaka Loveless, Mette Lax, Djämes Braun & Steggerbomben)	–	TBA

Featured in

Year	Single	Peak positions	Album
Year	Single	DEN	Album
2014	"Røgsignaler" (Camilio & Grande feat. Klumben)	34	

== Videography ==
- 2012: "Hobby"
