= Denmark in the Eurovision Song Contest 2012 =

- Eurovision Song Contest 2012
- Participating broadcaster: Danmarks Radio (DR)
- Country: Denmark
- Selection process: Dansk Melodi Grand Prix 2012
- Selection date: 21 January 2012

Competing entry
- Song: "Should've Known Better"
- Artist: Soluna Samay
- Songwriters: Remee; Chief 1; Isam B

Placement
- Semi-final result: Qualified (9th, 63 points)
- Final result: 23rd, 21 points

Participation chronology

Denmark was represented at the Eurovision Song Contest 2012 with the song "Should've Known Better" written by Chief 1, Remee and Isam B. The song was performed by Soluna Samay. The Danish broadcaster DR organised the national final Dansk Melodi Grand Prix 2012 in order to select the Danish entry for the 2012 contest in Baku, Azerbaijan. Nine songs competed in a televised show where "Should've Known Better" performed by Soluna Samay was the winner as decided upon through the combination of jury voting and public voting over two rounds.

Denmark was drawn to compete in the first semi-final of the Eurovision Song Contest which took place on 22 May 2012. Performing during the show in position 13, "Should've Known Better" was announced among the top 10 entries of the first semi-final and therefore qualified to compete in the final on 26 May. It was later revealed that Denmark placed ninth out of the 18 participating countries in the semi-final with 63 points. In the final, Denmark performed in position 15 and placed twenty-third out of the 26 participating countries, scoring 21 points.

== Background ==
Prior to the 2012 contest, Denmark had participated in the Eurovision Song Contest forty times since its first entry in 1957. Denmark had won the contest, to this point, on two occasions: in 1963 with the song "Dansevise" performed by Grethe and Jørgen Ingmann, and in 2000 with the song "Fly on the Wings of Love" performed by Olsen Brothers. In the 2011 contest, "New Tomorrow" performed by A Friend in London qualified Denmark to the final placing fifth.

The Danish national broadcaster, DR, broadcasts the event within Denmark and organises the selection process for the nation's entry. DR confirmed their intentions to participate at the 2012 Eurovision Song Contest on 15 May 2011. Denmark has selected all but one of their Eurovision entries through the national final Dansk Melodi Grand Prix. On 15 August 2011, the broadcaster announced that Dansk Melodi Grand Prix 2012 would be organised in order to select Denmark's entry for the 2012 contest.

== Before Eurovision ==
=== Dansk Melodi Grand Prix 2012 ===
Dansk Melodi Grand Prix 2012 was the 42nd edition of Dansk Melodi Grand Prix, the music competition that selects Denmark's entries for the Eurovision Song Contest. The event was held on 21 January 2012 at the Gigantium in Aalborg, hosted by Louise Wolff and Emil Thorup and was televised on DR1 with commentary by Ole Tøpholm as well as streamed online at the official DR website. The national final was watched by 1.506 million viewers in Denmark.

==== Format ====
Nine songs competed in one show where the winner was determined over two rounds of voting. In the first round, the top three songs based on the combination of votes from a public televote and a jury panel qualified to the superfinal. In the superfinal, the winner was determined by again the votes of the jury and public. The jury in the first round featured five Danish members, while the jury in the superfinal consisted of five members from each of the past four Eurovision Song Contest winning countries (Russia, Norway, Germany and Azerbaijan) alongside the Danish members. Viewers were able to vote via SMS.

The Danish jury was composed of:

- Kenneth Bager (President) – DJ and producer
- Laust Sonne – musician
- Søs Fenger – singer-songwriter
- Freja Loeb – musician and songwriter
- Lars Trillingsgaard – music director of DR

==== Competing entries ====
DR opened a submission period between 15 August 2011 and 26 September 2011 for artists and composers to submit their entries. The broadcaster received 678 entries during the submission period. A selection committee selected six songs from the entries submitted to the broadcaster, while four of the participants were invited to compete based on editorial considerations. DR held a press meet and greet at the DR Byen in Copenhagen on 5 January 2012 where the competing artists and songs were announced and officially presented.

On 9 January 2012, "Nowhere" written by Tine Lynggaard, Søren Itenov and Christoffer Stjerne and to have been performed by Valentine was disqualified from the competition as the song was released before 1 September 2011, the date allowed by the European Broadcasting Union.

Key: Disqualified

Artist	Song	Songwriter(s)	Selection
Aya	"Best Thing I Got"	John Gordon, Julie Frost	Open submission
Christian Brøns and Patrik Isaksson	"Venter"	Christian Brøns Petersen, Patrik Isaksson, Rune Braager	Invited by DR
Ditte Marie	"Overflow"	Mike Eriksson, Johnny Sanchez, Hanif Sabzevari	Open submission
Emilia and Philip	"Baby, Love Me"	Philip Halloun, Jonnaemilia Kärkkäinen	Open submission
Jesper Nohrstedt	"Take Our Hearts"	Mads B.B. Krog, Engelina Larsen, Morten Hampenberg	Invited by DR
Karen Viuff	"Universe"	Simon Borch, Lise Cabble, Boe Larsen	Open submission
Kenneth Potempa	"Reach for the Sky"	Peter Bjørnskov, Lene Dissing, Sune Haansbæk	Open submission
Soluna Samay	"Should've Known Better"	Chief 1, Remee, Isam B	Invited by DR
Suriya	"Forever I B Young"	Jakob Winge, Thomas Hoffmann, Suriyatim Hoffmann	Invited by DR
Valentine	"Nowhere"	Tine Lynggaard, Søren Itenov, Christoffer Stjerne	Open submission

==== Final ====
The final took place on 21 January 2012. In the first round of voting the top three advanced to the superfinal based on the votes of a five-member Danish jury (50%) and a public televote (50%). In the superfinal, the winner, "Should've Known Better" performed by Soluna Samay, was selected by the votes of the Danish jury together with four international juries (50%) and the public vote (50%). The viewers and the juries each had a total of 150 points to award in the superfinal. Each jury group distributed their points as follows: 8, 10 and 12 points. The viewer vote was based on the percentage of votes each song achieved. For example, if a song gained 10% of the viewer vote, then that entry would be awarded 10% of 150 points rounded to the nearest integer: 15 points.

In addition to the performances of the competing entries, Danish Eurovision 2011 entrant A Friend in London, Norwegian Eurovision Song Contest 2009 winner Alexander Rybak and Backstreet Boys member Howie D performed as the interval acts.

Final – 21 January 2012
R/O	Artist	Song	Result
1	Jesper Nohrstedt	"Take Our Hearts"	Advanced
2	Aya	"Best Thing I Got"	—N/a
3	Kenneth Potempa	"Reach for the Sky"	—N/a
4	Ditte Marie	"Overflow"	—N/a
5	Emilia and Philip	"Baby, Love Me"	—N/a
6	Suriya	"Forever I B Young"	—N/a
7	Karen Viuff	"Universe"	—N/a
8	Soluna Samay	"Should've Known Better"	Advanced
9	Christian Brøns and Patrik Isaksson	"Venter"	Advanced

Superfinal – 21 January 2012
R/O	Artist	Song	Jury	Televote	Total	Place
1	Jesper Nohrstedt	"Take Our Hearts"	56	46	102	2
2	Soluna Samay	"Should've Known Better"	54	56	110	1
3	Christian Brøns and Patrik Isaksson	"Venter"	40	48	88	3

Detailed international jury votes
R/O	Song	Norway	Russia	Germany	Azerbaijan	Denmark	Total
R/O	Song	Norway	Russia	Germany	Azerbaijan	Denmark	Total
1	"Take Our Hearts"	12	12	12	10	10	56
2	"Should've Known Better"	10	10	10	12	12	54
3	"Venter"	8	8	8	8	8	40

International jury members
Country	Members
Azerbaijan	Nigar Jamal (Chairperson) – singer, winner of the Eurovision Song Contest 2011 as a part of Ell & Nikki; Eldar Gasimov – singer, winner of the Eurovision Song Contest 2011 as a part of Ell & Nikki; Isa Melikov – composer, producer of Nigar Jamal; Dilara Kazimova – singer, ex-member of Unformal, Azerbaijani entrant at Eurovision Song Contest 2014; Aysel Teymurzadeh – singer, Azerbaijani entrant at Eurovision Song Contest 2009 with Arash
Germany	Oceana (Chairperson) – singer; Rüdiger Brans – singer, lead singer of The Baseballs; Peter Bergener – journalist; Roger Cicero – singer, German entrant at Eurovision Song Contest 2007; Mike Rötgens – producer
Norway	Alexander Rybak (Chairperson) – singer, winner of the Eurovision Song Contest 2009; Venke Knutson – singer; Omer Bhatti – rapper, close friend of Michael Jackson; Kjell Peter Askersrud – music professor; Bjørn Johan Muri – singer
Russia	Alexey Vorobyov (Chairperson) – singer, Russian entrant at Eurovision Song Contest 2011; Lera Masskva – singer; Yuri Madianik – musician; Anna Kulikova – singer; Mario Durand – singer, violinist

== At Eurovision ==
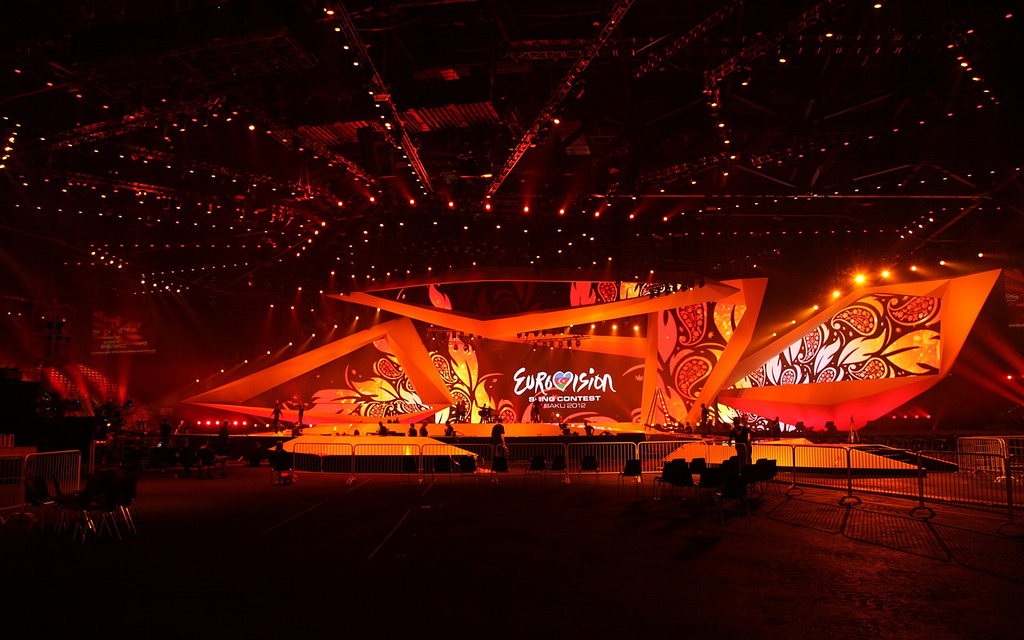
The Eurovision Song Contest 2012 took place at the Baku Crystal Hall in Baku, Azerbaijan

According to Eurovision rules, all nations with the exceptions of the host country and the "Big Five" (France, Germany, Italy, Spain and the United Kingdom) are required to qualify from one of two semi-finals to compete for the final; the top ten countries from each semi-final progress to the final. The European Broadcasting Union (EBU) split up the competing countries into six different pots based on voting patterns from previous contests, with countries with favourable voting histories put into the same pot. On 25 January 2012, an allocation draw was held which placed each country into one of the two semi-finals, as well as which half of the show they would perform in. Denmark was placed into the first semi-final, to be held on 22 May 2012, and was scheduled to perform in the second half of the show. The running order for the semi-finals was decided through another draw on 20 March 2012 and Denmark was set to perform in position 13, following the entry from Cyprus and before the entry from Russia.

The two semi-finals and final were broadcast on DR1 and DR HD with commentary by Ole Tøpholm. DR appointed Louise Wolff as its spokesperson to announce the Danish votes during the final.

=== Semi-final ===
Soluna Samay took part in technical rehearsals on 14 and 17 May, followed by dress rehearsals on 21 and 22 May. This included the jury show on 21 May where the professional juries of each country watched and voted on the competing entries.

The Danish performance featured Soluna Samay dressed in a red outfit and performing in a band set-up with a drummer, pianist, double bassist, cellist and backing vocalist sitting on a sofa. The stage colours were predominantly warm and the LED screens transitioned from a dawn effect to landscapes at sunset and Chinese lanterns that float towards the sky. The musicians that joined Soluna Samay were Ihan Haydar (drums), Barbara Boitumelo Moleko Ærsøe, Jesper Faaborg Jensen and Kewan Padré Hussein, while the backing vocalist was Anja Akselbo. Ihan Haydar would go on to represent Denmark in the Eurovision Song Contest 2022 as a member of the band Reddi.

At the end of the show, Denmark was announced as having finished in the top 10 and subsequently qualifying for the grand final. It was later revealed that Denmark placed ninth in the semi-final, receiving a total of 63 points.

=== Final ===
Shortly after the first semi-final, a winners' press conference was held for the ten qualifying countries. As part of this press conference, the qualifying artists took part in a draw to determine the running order for the final. This draw was done in the order the countries were announced during the semi-final. Denmark was drawn to perform in position 15, following the entry from Romania and before the entry from Greece.

Soluna Samay once again took part in dress rehearsals on 25 and 26 May before the final, including the jury final where the professional juries cast their final votes before the live show. Soluna Samay performed a repeat of her semi-final performance during the final on 26 May. Denmark placed twenty-third in the final, scoring 21 points.

=== Voting ===
Voting during the three shows consisted of 50 percent public televoting and 50 percent from a jury deliberation. The jury consisted of five music industry professionals who were citizens of the country they represent. This jury was asked to judge each contestant based on: vocal capacity; the stage performance; the song's composition and originality; and the overall impression by the act. In addition, no member of a national jury could be related in any way to any of the competing acts in such a way that they cannot vote impartially and independently.

Following the release of the full split voting by the EBU after the conclusion of the competition, it was revealed that Denmark had placed twenty-third with the public televote and twenty-first with the jury vote in the final. In the public vote, Denmark scored 18 points, while with the jury vote, Denmark scored 51 points. In the first semi-final, Denmark placed ninth with the public televote with 53 points and sixth with the jury vote, scoring 81 points.

Below is a breakdown of points awarded to Denmark and awarded by Denmark in the first semi-final and grand final of the contest. The nation awarded its 12 points to Russia in the semi-final and to Sweden in the final of the contest.

==== Points awarded to Denmark ====
Points awarded to Denmark (Semi-final 1)
Score	Country
12 points	
10 points	Switzerland
8 points	Finland; Iceland; Latvia
7 points	Ireland
6 points	Italy
5 points	
4 points	Cyprus; San Marino
3 points	Romania; Russia
2 points	
1 point	Greece; Hungary

Points awarded to Denmark (Final)
Score	Country
12 points	
10 points	
8 points	
7 points	
6 points	
5 points	Finland; Germany; Iceland
4 points	
3 points	
2 points	Estonia; Italy; Norway
1 point	

==== Points awarded by Denmark ====
Points awarded by Denmark (Semi-final 1)
Score	Country
12 points	Russia
10 points	Iceland
8 points	Finland
7 points	Albania
6 points	Moldova
5 points	Hungary
4 points	Greece
3 points	Israel
2 points	Ireland
1 point	Romania

Points awarded by Denmark (Final)
Score	Country
12 points	Sweden
10 points	Germany
8 points	Russia
7 points	Moldova
6 points	Iceland
5 points	Albania
4 points	Ireland
3 points	Italy
2 points	Turkey
1 point	Romania

==== Detailed voting results from Denmark ====
Source:

==== Semi-final 1 ====
Jury points awarded in first semi-final:

12 points	Moldova
10 points	Israel
8 points	Albania
7 points	Greece
6 points	Hungary
5 points	Finland
4 points	Cyprus
3 points	Russia
2 points	Austria
1 point	Ireland

==== Final ====
Jury points awarded in the final:

12 points	Sweden
10 points	Germany
8 points	Moldova
7 points	Albania
6 points	Russia
5 points	Cyprus
4 points	Italy
3 points	Spain
2 points	Romania
1 point	Greece
