= Payback Time =

Studio album by DJ Aligator
- Released: October 8, 2000
- Genres: Trance, Eurodance
- Length: 49:59
- Label: FLEX
- Producers: DJ Aligator, Jonas Schrøder, Adam Powers, Paw Lagermann, Lina Rafn, Erik Fryland

DJ Aligator chronology
Payback Time (2000)	The Sound of Scandinavia (2002)

Singles from Payback Time
- 1. "The Whistle Song" Released: March 2000; 2. "Lollipop" Released: June 2000; 3. "Turn Up the Music" Released: October 2000; 4. "Doggy Style" Released: January 2001; 5. "Temple of India" Released: 2001

Payback Time is the debut album by the Iranian-Danish Eurodance producer DJ Aligator, released in 2000 on Kenneth Bager's FLEX Records. It includes the four times platinum selling single "The Whistle Song", which peaked at No. 5 on the UK Singles Chart in 2002.

== Track listing ==
No.	Title	Writer(s)	Producer(s)	Length
1.	"The Whistle Song"	DJ Aligator, Al Agami, Holger Lagerfeldt	DJ Aligator	3:41
2.	"Turn Up the Music"	Kenneth Bager, Agami, Ian Ion, Kenn "The Killer" Haunstoft, Chris C.	DJ Aligator, Paw Lagermann, Lina Rafn	5:12
3.	"Payback Time"	DJ Aligator, Agami, Moses Malone	DJ Aligator	5:36
4.	"Water in the Ocean"	DJ Aligator, Jonas Schrøder, Adam Powers, Michael Parsberg, Jakob Stavnstrup	DJ Aligator, Schrøder, Powers	4:53
5.	"Welcome to Future"	DJ Aligator	DJ Aligator	4:11
6.	"Lollipop"	DJ Aligator	DJ Aligator	3:48
7.	"Bounce 2 This"	DJ Aligator, Agami, Malone, Schrøder, Powers	DJ Aligator, Schrøder, Powers	4:21
8.	"Temple of India"	DJ Aligator	DJ Aligator	7:21
9.	"Doggy Style"	DJ Aligator, Agami	DJ Aligator	4:01
10.	"Calling Out Your Name"	DJ Aligator, Schrøder, Powers	DJ Aligator, Schrøder, Erik Fryland	6:14

2nd edition bonus tracks
No.	Title	Writer(s)	Producer(s)	Length
11.	"Black Celebration"	DJ Aligator, Lagerfeldt	DJ Aligator	3:24
12.	"Temple of India" (Krystal Remix)	DJ Aligator	DJ Aligator	9:14
13.	"Lollipop" (Darude vs. JS 16 Mix)	DJ Aligator	DJ Aligator	6:42
14.	"The Whistle Song" (Musical Suspects vs. Krystal)	DJ Aligator, Agami, Lagerfeldt	DJ Aligator	8:20

== Charts ==
Chart (2001)	Peak position
Danish Albums (Hitlisten)	17
Norwegian Albums (VG-lista)	33
Swedish Albums (Sverigetopplistan)	31
