= Come Again (novel) =

2020 novel by Robert Webb

- First edition cover
- Author: Robert Webb
- Language: English
- Genres: Science fiction; romance; thriller
- Publisher: Canongate Books (UK); Little, Brown and Company (US)
- Publication date: April 2020 (UK); July 2020 (US)
- Publication place: United Kingdom
- Media type: Hardback, paperback, ebook
- Pages: 288 (UK); 304 (US)
- ISBN: 978-1-78689-012-2 (UK); 978-0-316-50027-2 (US)

Come Again is a 2020 novel by English comedian, actor and author Robert Webb. It is his debut novel and was first published in July 2020 in the United Kingdom by Canongate Books. Webb had previously written his memoir, How Not to Be a Boy, published by Canongate in 2017.

== Background ==
Webb is best known for his role, alongside David Mitchell, in the British sitcom, Peep Show. After the success of his memoir in 2017, Canongate asked Webb if he had any ideas for a novel, and he suggested Come Again. The idea for the story had initially come to him while filming Peep Show in 2012 and had preoccupied him ever since. Webb began writing Come Again in 2017, but told interviewers in April 2020 that it was "harder" than How Not to Be a Boy. Memoirs are about "real people and real memories, and it’s just a question of selecting the right memories and putting them in the right order". For Webb, Come Again involved the learning curve of "becoming a novelist", rather than simply "writing a novel".

Webb described Come Again as "mainly a romp and a lark and it's there to be enjoyed, and people can do with that kind of distraction [during the COVID-19 lockdowns]." He acknowledged that the time travel aspects of the book and the "comedy farce" at the end may "seem a little far-fetched", but suggested that readers "switch off their critical faculties and just go along for the ride". Webb said "I know it ain't going to win the Booker ... but basically I'm writing exactly the kind of book I want to read".

== Plot introduction ==
Kate Marsden is a mid-forties IT specialist who works for BelTech, an organisation which sanitises clients' online presence. Her husband, Luke, has recently died of an undiagnosed brain tumour and she is besides herself with grief. She quits her job and plans to commit suicide. Then one morning she wakes up in her campus room at university in 1992. She has gone back in time 28 years and is 18 again, but with all her present-day memories intact. She has yet to meet Luke and realises that she has an opportunity to alert him to his tumour and prevent his death later.

== Critical reception ==
In a review of Come Again in The Times, John Self said Webb's writing is "clean [and] affable" and adapts itself well to the novel's tension and comedy. The author draws on his experience in TV and stage, producing "big characters ... snappy dialogue [and] visual flourishes". Self liked how Kate managed to make things work with Luke back in 1992, despite having already had a relationship with him. Self also noted how effective the book is in highlighting how distant and "foreign" the 1990s have become.

Reviewing the book in The Guardian, Sam Leith described it as part "comedy thriller", part "wistful science-fictional romance". He said it is "well paced, nicely written and highly entertaining", despite some "cartoony" dialogue and "implausibil[e] ... plot elements". Leith added that no attempt is made to explain how time travel works, and the story enters "massive paradox territory" in the final section.

Chris Dobson was a little more critical of the novel. Writing in the Scottish Herald, Dobson likened Come Again to a sandwich: "it has a warm, delicious filling, but the bread on either side is a bit stale". It takes a while to get to the fun parts of the "outlandish" plot. He complimented Webb on his "powerful insights into grief and mental health", but felt that this part is too long. Dobson complained that Come Again "feels like two books that have been awkwardly stitched together". The time-travelling romance "is a delight", but the "spy thriller" sections are too much of a distraction here and belong in another story.

== Optioning ==
Firebird Pictures optioned Come Again for a potential television adaptation in 2020.

== Works cited ==
- Webb, Robert (2020). Come Again. Canongate Books. ISBN 978-1-78689-012-2.
