= UFO Yepha =

Danish music duo

- Also known as: Whyyou
- Origin: Denmark
- Genres: Hip Hop
- Years active: 2002-2011
- Past members: UFO (Kristian Humaidan); Yepha (Jeppe Bruun Wahlstrøm)

UFO Yepha is a famous Danish music duo made up of Kristian Humaidan (born in 1981) known by his stage name UFO and Jeppe Bruun Wahlstrøm (born in 1983) known by his stage name Yepha. The duo was from Svendborg, then Aarhus finally moving to Copenhagen in their last years. UFO Yepha split-up in 2011. At times, the duo were also known as Whyyou (taking lead from first letters of their names "why" (Y) for Yepha and "you (U) for UFO).

== Career ==
Their first chart success together was "Hver dag". The singles topped the Danish Singles Chart staying seven weeks at #1. Their album Ingen som os in 2006 brought further success to the hip hop duo.

The group had previously appeared on MC Clemens' second album, Den anden verden as a collective Kælderposen (alias Kældersquad) which included UFO Yepha, Rune Buoy, Jot, LX, Jesper Drejer, Ole R and DJ Rescue.

Owning their own studios, they also produced other artists, including Ali Kazim and his album Gadedrøm in addition to their own materials.

The duo moved to Copenhagen in 2008. UFO Yepha split-up in 2011.

== Awards ==
- UFO Yepha won an award of 50,000 Kr from the Danish Arts Foundation in 2006 for Ingen som os.
- In 2007, UFO Yepha were also nominated in two categories for the Danish Music Awards
- Other nominations included Zulu Awards and Tjeck Awards.
- In 2009 their music video "Næh næh" won "Best music video" at the Danish Music Awards

== After-split-up ==
After split-up, Humaidan (UFO) has developed a solo career on his own.

=== Yepha solo career ===
Meanwhile, Yepha is cooperating with various artists and most notably Morten Hampenberg & Alexander Brown being featured in a number of their releases including "Skub til taget" (2009) and "Det stikker helt af" (2011) and "Klovn" (also in 2011).

== Discography ==
(For discographies as solo artists, refer to UFO (musician) and Yepha)

=== Albums ===
Year	Title	Highest position	Certification
Year	Title	[Hitlisten|DEN]	Certification
2003	U vs. Y	28	
2006	Ingen som os	20	
2008	Kig mig i øjnene	32	

=== Singles ===
(Selective and only charting singles)

Year	Single	Peak chart positions	Certifications	Album
Year	Single	DEN	Certifications	Album
2003	"Hver dag"	1		U vs. Y
2008	"Næh næh" (UFO Yepha feat. Anna David)	20		Kig mig i øjnene
2009	"Stille og roligt knald pa"	27		Kig mig i øjnene

== See also ==
- UFO (musician)
- Yepha
