= MC Vspyshkin =

Russian DJ and singer

Vladimir Aleksandrovich Turkov
- Birth name: Владимир Александрович Турков
- Also known as: MC Вспышкин
- Born: 31 October 1936 Leningrad, Soviet Union
- Died: 14 November 2011 (aged 75) Saint Petersburg, Russia
- Genres: Electronic dance music
- Occupation(s): Dj, singer
- Years active: 1990s – 2011

Vladimir Aleksandrovich Turkov (Russian: Владимир Александрович Турков; 31 October 1936 – 14 November 2011) was a Russian radio presenter, cinema actor, DJ and singer, who was known by the stage name MC Vspyshkin (Russian: MC Вспышкин).

He was a renowned figure in Russian electronic dance music of 2000s. Starting as DJ at his advanced age, he wore a big natural beard and mustache, extravagant costumes and used offbeat humor in his texts, which most strikingly set him apart from other performers of that time.

== Early life ==
Vladimir Turkov was born on 31 October 1936 in Leningrad. His parents were not married. The father died at the front of the Second World War in 1941.

Vladimir Turkov survived the Siege of Leningrad. After graduation of secondary school, he served in the Soviet Armed Forces as a conscript, graduated from university and worked in the D. I. Mendeleev Institute for Metrology as engineer. In 1970s, he was also an administrator of the Soviet rock band "Kochevniki" (also known as "Savoyary").

== Bodybuilding ==
Vladimir Turkov was a bodybuilder and in 1960s opened a gym club "Monolith", where youth could try themselves in this kind of activity. For this reason, Turkov had been persecuted by the regional officials, because Soviet authorities were suspicious of bodybuilding movement. He also organized a hockey rink.

== Actor career ==
From late 1980s till early 2000s, Vladimir Turkov appeared in episodic roles in different films and series.

== Radio and music career ==
In late 1990s, Vladimir Turkov, taking the stage name MC Vspyshkin, started to work as DJ at rave parties in local nightclubs and as radio host on the radio station "Radio Record".

In 2004, the album Sex, which was made in collaboration with Dmitry Chekov (known as Nikiforovna), was released. In 2004–2005, two albums, made in collaboration with DJ Gagarin, were released.

In 2005, MC Vspyshkin and DJ Aligator released a collaborative single Davaj Davaj.

== Death ==
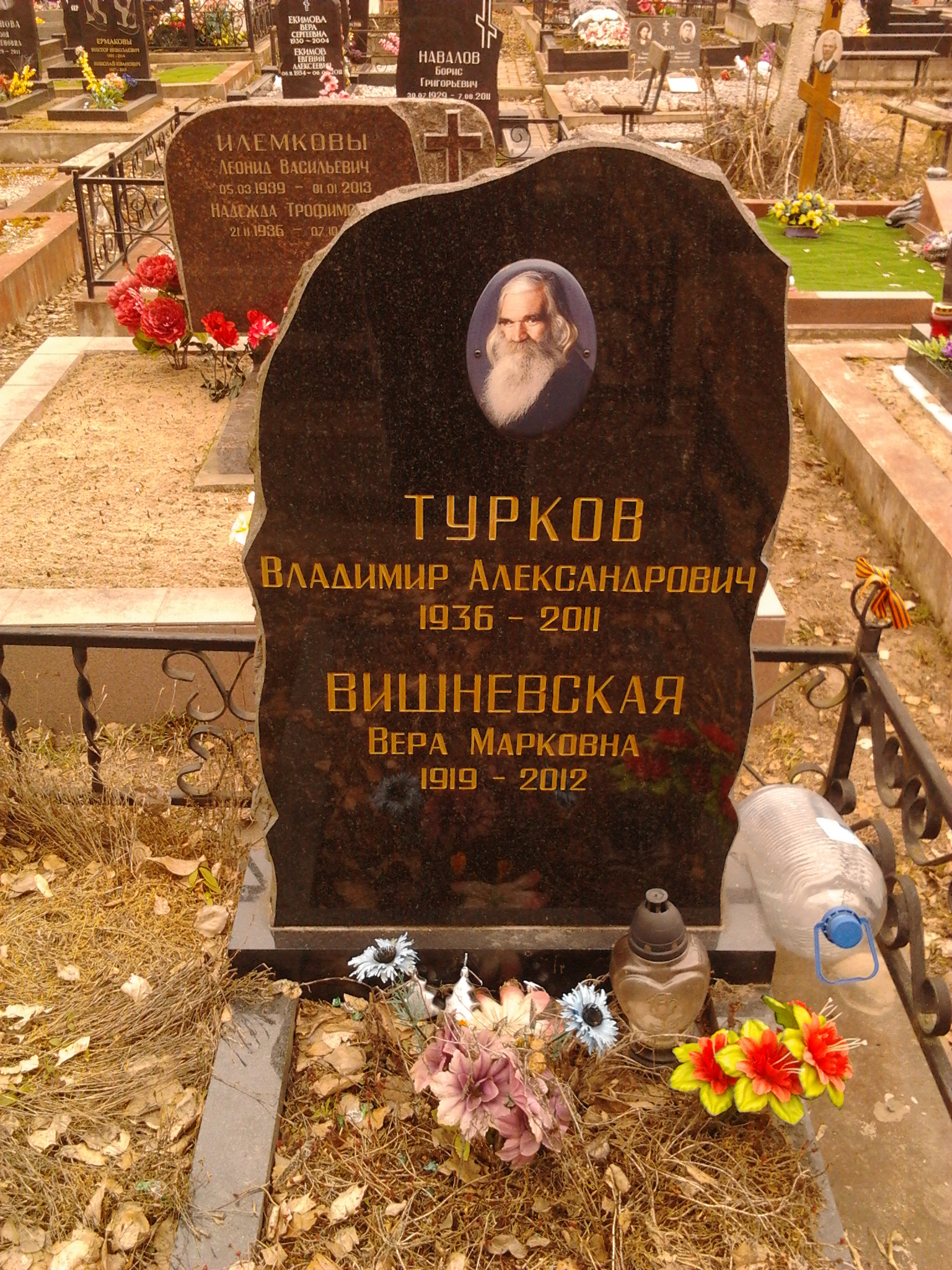
The tombstone of Vladimir Turkov and his mother

Vladimir Turkov died of a heart attack on 14 November 2011 on the platform of the metro station Ulitsa Dybenko.

He was buried in the Smolensky Cemetery.

== Family ==
Turkov was married and had one daughter, two sons and four grandchildren.

His mother died in 2012, outliving her son by several months.

== Legacy ==
To commemorate the tenth anniversary of Vladimir Turkov's death, a memorial photo album was released.
