= Hamidaniyeh =

Hamidaniyeh حميدانيه
- Village
- Location within Iran
- Coordinates: 31°40′24″N 49°01′07″E
- Country: Iran
- Province: Khuzestan
- County: Bavi
- Bakhsh: Central
- Rural District: Mollasani

Population (2006)
  - Total: 154
- Time zone: UTC+3:30 (IRST)
  - Summer (DST): UTC+4:30 (IRDT)

Hamidaniyeh (Persian: حميدانيه, also Romanized as Ḩamīdānīyeh; also known as Ḩamīdānīyeh-ye Kūchak and Humaidania) is a village in Mollasani Rural District, in the Central District of Bavi County, Khuzestan Province, Iran. At the 2006 census, its population was 154, in 31 families.
