= Siff =

Siff is a surname. Notable people with the surname include:

- Gregory Siff (born 1977), American visual artist, designer, and actor
- Helen Siff (1937–2025), American actress
- Maggie Siff (born 1974), American actress

== See also ==
- SIFF (disambiguation)
- Siff Pettersen (1934–2000), Norwegian operatic soprano
