= DJ Aligator =

Iranian record producer (born 1975)

- Born: Aliasghar Movasat; 10 March 1975 (age 51); Tehran, Iran
- Occupations: Electronic musician, DJ, record producer
- Years active: 1994–present
- Website: aligatormusic.com

Ali Asghar Movasat (Persian: علی‌اصغر مواسات), better known by his stage name DJ Aligator, is an Iranian-Danish producer and DJ.

== Musical career ==
He enjoyed worldwide success with the single "The Whistle Song" from his 2000 debut album Payback Time. It peaked at number 5 in the United Kingdom in January 2002, and subsequently, he performed it on BBC Television's Top of the Pops. The song was a four times platinum selling success in Denmark (200,000 units) in 2000, peaking at number-one on both the singles and dance chart, before its international release in 2002.

In 2022, DJ Aligator was featured on Steve Aoki's track "The Whistle" along with Timmy Trumpet. The song appeared on Aoki's seventh studio album Hiroquest: Genesis.

== Discography ==
=== Studio albums ===
Title	Details	Peak chart positions	
Title	Details	DEN	SWE
Payback Time	Release date: October 8, 2000; Label: FLEX; Formats: Streaming, digital download, CD	17	31
The Sound of Scandinavia	Release date: May 22, 2002; Formats: Streaming, digital download, CD	3	—
Music Is My Language	Release date: April 15, 2005; Label: EMI; Formats: Streaming, digital download, CD	39	—
Kiss My Bass	Release date: 2009; Label: Disco:Wax/WMG; Formats: Streaming, digital download, CD	33	—
Next Level	Release date: November 19, 2012; Label: Gator; Formats: Streaming, digital download, CD	—	—
"—" denotes releases that did not chart

=== Singles ===
Year	Single	Peak chart positions								Certifications (sales thresholds)	Album
Year	Single	AUS	DEN	FIN	IRE	NED	NOR	SWE	UK	Certifications (sales thresholds)	Album
2000	"The Whistle Song"	100	1	—	5	54	1	10	5		Payback Time
2000	"Lollipop"	—	1	—	18	—	9	8	—		Payback Time
2000	"Turn Up the Music"	—	4	—	78	—	—	49	—		Payback Time
2001	"Doggy Style"	—	10	—	—	—	—	44	—		Payback Time
2001	"Temple of India"	—	—	—	—	—	—	—	—		Payback Time
2002	"Stomp!"	—	1	—	—	2	—	—	—		The Sound of Scandinavia
2002	"I Like to Move It" (featuring Dr. Alban)	—	2	—	—	—	—	—	—		The Sound of Scandinavia
2002	"Mosquito"	—	—	—	—	—	—	—	—		The Sound of Scandinavia
2002	"Dreams" (featuring Christina Undhjem)	—	15	—	—	—	—	—	—		The Sound of Scandinavia
2004	"Davaj Davaj" (featuring MC Vspyshkin)	—	7	—	—	—	—	—	—		Music Is My Language
2005	"Music is My Language" (featuring Arash)	—	11	—	—	—	—	—	—		Music Is My Language
2005	"Protect Your Ears"	—	4	16	—	—	—	—	—		Music Is My Language
2006	"Countdown"	—	—	—	—	—	—	—	—		Music Is My Language
2007	"Meet Her at the Lover Parade 2007"	—	—	—	—	—	—	—	—		Non-album single
2008	"KAOS"	—	—	—	—	—	—	—	—		Kiss My Bass
2009	"Calling You"	—	—	15	—	—	—	—	—		Kiss My Bass
2009	"Shine" (featuring Heidi Degn)	—	—	—	—	—	—	—	—		Kiss My Bass
2010	"Gi' det til dig" (featuring Jinks)	—	—	—	—	—	—	—	—		Non-album single
2011	"Starting Over"	—	—	—	—	—	—	—	—		Next Level
2011	"Trash the Club" (featuring Al Agami & Yas)	—	—	—	—	—	—	—	—		Next Level
2012	"The Perfect Match" (with Daniel Kandi featuring Julie Rugaard)	—	—	—	—	—	—	—	—		Next Level
2012	"Moments of Life" (featuring Alexander Popov)	—	—	—	—	—	—	—	—		Next Level
2012	"Be with You" (featuring Sarah West)	—	—	—	—	—	—	—	—		Next Level
2014	"Fist Pump"	—	—	—	—	—	—	—	—	—	Non-album singles
2016	"Heaven Is Falling" (featuring AERO)	—	—	—	—	—	—	—	—	—	Non-album singles
2017	"Put Your Lights Up" (featuring Decaville)	—	—	—	—	—	—	—	—	—	Non-album singles
2018	"Agmal Hayaa (Beautiful Life)" (featuring Talal)	—	—	—	—	—	—	—	—	—	Non-album singles
2018	"Drop the Bass"	—	—	—	—	—	—	—	—	—	Non-album singles
2023	"Feel Like Coming Home"	—	—	—	—	—	—	—	—	—	Non-album singles
2023	"—" denotes releases that did not chart										
