= Morten Hampenberg & Alexander Brown =

Danish music duo

- Origin: Denmark
- Genres: Pop
- Years active: 2009-2013
- Past members: Morten Hampenberg; Alexander Brown

Morten Hampenberg & Alexander Brown are a Danish duo since 2009 when the two started releasing joint singles. Sometimes recordings would include collaborations with other artists like Yepha, Stine Bramsen, Casper Christensen, Nabiha and others. They gained international fame with "Raise the Roof" featuring Fatman Scoop, Pitbull & Nabiha.

The two also have their established solo careers and release recordings on their own as well. Morten Hampenberg is a well-known record producer and Alexander Brown is a DJ.

== Members ==
=== Morten Hampenberg ===
Morten Rask Hampenberg (born 14 January 1977) is a Danish music producer known for a great number of solo hits besides his cooperation with the musician Alexander Brown. For his solo career, Morten Hampenberg had used the family name alone and was known as Hampenberg with his solo recordings until 2008 credited to that name. Starting 2009, he started using his full name both in his solo releases and in his joint releases with Alexander Brown. He also goes by the alias Moám, under which he co-produced Example's UK #2 hit "Say Nothing", and remixed "Stay Awake" and "Watch the Sun Come Up".

=== Alexander Brown ===
Alexander Brown (born Kenneth Nikolaisen in 1982) is a Danish DJ. He started DJing when he was 15. In a successful career, he was nominated as Best Danish DJ for 4 years in a row. He was part of the Ministry of Sound Tour.

== Discography: Morten Hampenberg & Alexander Brown ==
=== Singles ===
Year	Single	Peak position	Certification
Year	Single	DAN	Certification
2009	"Røgmaskine"	37	
2009	"Skub til taget" (featuring Yepha)	3	Gold
2010	"Istanbul"	31	
2011	"Det stikker helt af" (featuring Yepha)	6	Gold
2011	"I Want You (To Want Me Back)" (featuring Stine Bramsen)	4	Gold
2011	"Klovn" (with Yepha & Casper Christensen)	5	Gold
2012	"Raise the Roof" (feat. Pitbull, Fatman Scoop & Nabiha)	8	
2013	"You're A Star" (feat. Busta Rhymes & Shonie)	–	
