= The Whistle Song (DJ Aligator Project song) =

2000 single by DJ Aligator Project

Single by DJ Aligator Project

from the album Payback Time
- Released: 22 February 2000
- Length: 3:42; 3:13 (2002 edit)
- Label: FLEX Club
- Songwriter(s): Al Agami; Holger Lagerfeldt; DJ Aligator
- Producer(s): DJ Aligator

DJ Aligator Project singles chronology
| "The Whistle Song" (2000) | "Lollipop" (2000) |

Music video
- "The Whistle Song" on YouTube

"The Whistle Song" is a song by Iranian-Danish disc jockey DJ Aligator, recorded under the name "DJ Aligator Project". The song was written by Al Agami, Holger Lagerfeldt, and DJ Aligator, who also produced the track. It samples the 1929 song "Singin' in the Rain" and is a trance-influenced song.

"The Whistle Song" was released on 22 February 2000 as DJ Aligator's debut single and topped the Danish Singles Chart, earning a triple-platinum sales certification. It also reached number one in Norway and entered the top 10 in Ireland and Sweden. In 2002, it was re-released in the UK with the subtitle "Blow My Whistle Bitch" (censored as "Blow My Whistle Baby") and reached a new peak of number five on the UK Singles Chart, where it originally peaked at number 57.

== Background ==
DJ Aligator was inspired to create "The Whistle Song" following a club night where some guests had brought along a referee whistle, which they repeatedly blew along to the music he was playing.

== Chart performance ==
"The Whistle Song" debuted at number two on the Danish Singles Chart in March 2000 and rose to number one the following week. It stayed atop the chart for nine weeks and received a triple-platinum sales certification from IFPI Danmark, denoting shipments of 33,000 units. The song was Denmark's second-most-successful single of 2000. On the 16th chart week of 2000, the song appeared on the Norwegian VG-lista chart at number 13, eventually rising to number one on chart week 22. In Sweden, it debuted at number 36 on the Sverigetopplistan chart but fell off the listing two weeks later. It then immediately re-entered the top 40 and jumped to number 12 on 25 May 2000, then ascended to its peak of number 10 on 29 June. It was Sweden's 67th-most-successful single of 2000 and was certified gold by the Swedish Recording Industry Association for shipping over 15,000 copies. In mainland Europe, it also charted in the Netherlands in September and October 2000, attaining a peak of number 54.

The song was an instant success in Ireland, reaching number five on the Irish Singles Chart in May 2000 and ending the year as the country's 46th-most-successful single. However, in the United Kingdom, the track stalled at number 57 on the UK Singles Chart in October. In 2002, following the creation of remixes and exposure in television advertisements, "The Whistle Song" was re-released with the subtitle "Blow My Whistle Bitch", this time reaching number five on the UK chart and peaking atop the Scottish Singles Chart. During this chart run, it achieved its peak of number 38 on the Eurochart Hot 100. The song also charted in Australia, reaching number 100 in September 2000.

== Track listings ==
Danish CD single

1. "The Whistle Song" (clean radio version) – 3:42
2. "The Whistle Song" (Andy Trent radio mix) – 3:46

European maxi-CD single

1. "The Whistle Song" (clean radio version) – 3:42
2. "The Whistle Song" (dirty radio version) – 3:42
3. "The Whistle Song" (Andy Trent radio mix) – 3:46
4. "The Whistle Song" (extended version) – 5:19
5. "The Whistle Song" (club version) – 5:36
6. "The Whistle Song" (Andy Trent club mix) – 8:17
7. "The Whistle Song" (Krystal vs. Musical Suspects remix) – 8:45

UK CD single (2000)

1. "The Whistle Song" (radio edit) – 3:42
2. "The Whistle Song" (Krystal vs. Musical Suspects remix) – 8:45
3. "The Whistle Song" (extended version) – 5:19

UK and European maxi-CD single (2002)

1. "The Whistle Song" (clean radio edit) – 3:13
2. "The Whistle Song" (Andy Trent radio mix) – 3:44
3. "The Whistle Song" (club version) – 5:36
4. "The Whistle Song" (Andy Trent club mix) – 8:17
5. "The Whistle Song" (Krystal vs. Musical Suspects remix) – 8:22
6. "The Whistle Song" (Kenny Hayes Headhunter remix) – 7:41

== Charts ==
=== Weekly charts ===
| Chart (2000) | Peak position |
|---|---|
| Australia (ARIA) | 100 |
| Denmark (IFPI) | 1 |
| Europe (Eurochart Hot 100) | 54 |
| Ireland (IRMA) | 5 |
| Netherlands (Dutch Top 40 Tipparade) | 6 |
| Netherlands (Single Top 100) | 54 |
| Norway (VG-lista) | 1 |
| Scotland (OCC) | 32 |
| Sweden (Sverigetopplistan) | 10 |
| UK Singles (OCC) | 57 |

| Chart (2002) | Peak position |
|---|---|
| Europe (Eurochart Hot 100) | 38 |
| Scotland (OCC) | 1 |
| UK Singles (OCC) | 5 |
| UK Dance (OCC) | 11 |

=== Year-end charts ===
| Chart (2000) | Position |
|---|---|
| Denmark (IFPI) | 2 |
| Ireland (IRMA) | 46 |
| Sweden (Hitlistan) | 67 |

| Chart (2002) | Position |
|---|---|
| UK Singles (OCC) | 96 |

== Certifications ==
| Region | Certification | Certified units/sales |
|---|---|---|
| Denmark (IFPI Danmark) | 3× Platinum | 33,000 |
| Sweden (GLF) | Gold | 15,000^{^} |
Summaries
| Worldwide | — | 800,000 |
^{^} Shipments figures based on certification alone.

== Release history ==
| Region | Date | Format(s) | Label(s) | Ref. |
|---|---|---|---|---|
| Denmark | 22 February 2000 | CD | FLEX Club | |
| Spain | June 2000 | 12-inch vinyl | Blanco y Negro | |
| United Kingdom | 25 September 2000 | 12-inch vinyl; CD; cassette | Liberty EMI UK | |
