= Christian Brøns =

Danish singer

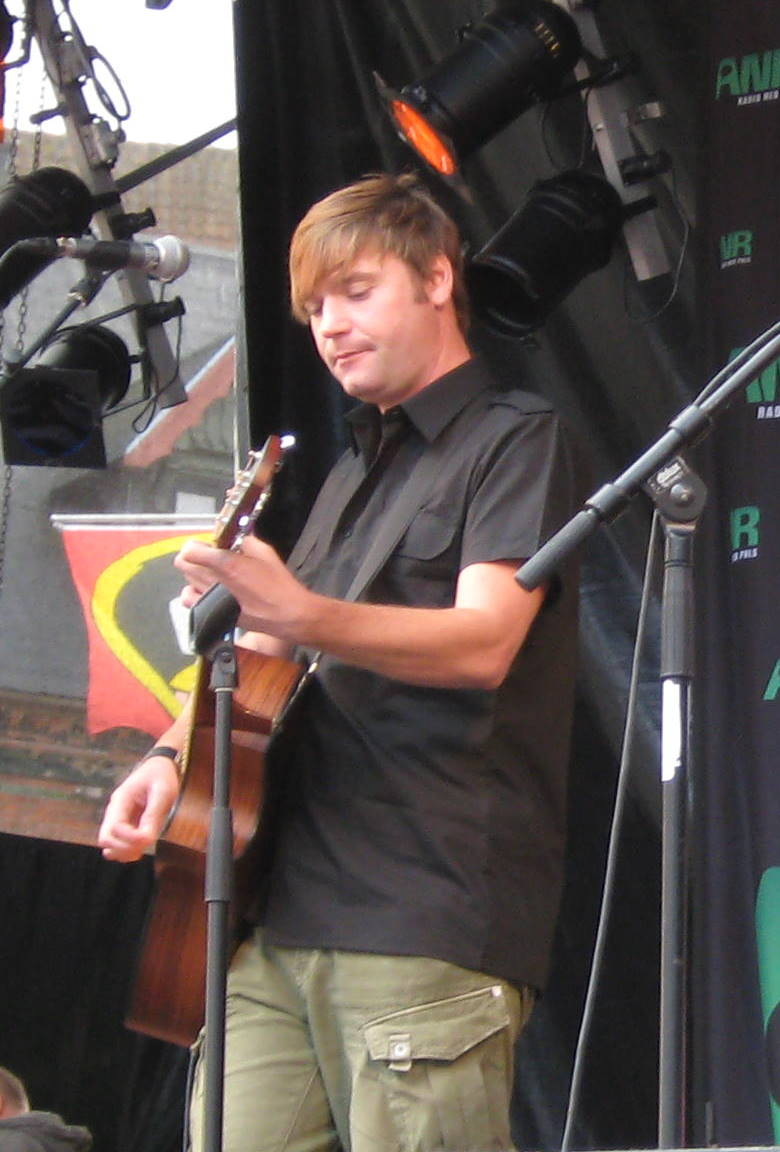
- Christian Brøns in 2010

Background information
- Born: Christian Brøns Petersen; 24 January 1977 (age 49)
- Origin: Kagerup, Helsinge, Denmark
- Genres: Pop
- Occupation: Singer
- Years active: 2011–present

Christian Brøns Petersen (born 24 January 1977) is a Danish singer.

In 2001, Christian took part in the first season of TV Danmark's reality television series Big Brother, but withdrew in protest. Shortly after he signed with Spin Music releasing his debut album Du kan gøre hvad du vil in 2001. The title track from the album was chosen as the Best Hit on Denmark's P3 radio station. It is a cover version of a song written by Patrik Isaksson in 1999. Next single was "Tilbage hvor vi var", a duet with Patrik Isaksson and another major hit reaching number 1 on Tracklisten, the official Danish Singles Chart. Consequently Christian Brøns won two Danish Music Awards for "Best Newcomer" and "Best Pop Album".

The follow-up album Opfølgeren Velkommen in 2002 was certified gold on Universal Music. In 2006, he released his third album Turist and after an absence of 4 years the album Det løser sig on ArtPeople label.

In Christian Brons took part with Patrik Isaksson in Dansk Melodi Grand Prix with the duet "Venter" (meaning "Waiting" in Danish) written by the two in a bid to represent Denmark in the Eurovision Song Contest coming third overall. On 23 January 2012 Brøns released his fifth album Under overfladen with Black Pelican/Sony Music engaging on a new joint tour with Isaksson.

== Discography ==
=== Albums ===
Year	Album	Record label	Peak position	Certification
Year	Album	Record label	DK	Certification
2001	Du kan gøre hvad du vil	Spin Music / Edel	1	
2002	Velkommen til Begyndelsen	Spin Music / Universal	13	
2006	Turist	Yessir Music	–	
2010	Det løser sig	ArtPeople	15	
2012	Under overfladen	Black Pelican / Sony Music	16	

=== Singles ===
Year	Song	Peak position	Certification	Peak position
Year	Song	DK	Certification	Peak position
2001	"Du kan gøre hvad du vil"	1		Du kan gøre hvad du vil
2001	"Tilbage til hvor vi var" (Christian Brøns & Patrik Isaksson)	1		Du kan gøre hvad du vil
2006	"Endnu et valg"	–		Turist
2010	"Bedst når vi er to"	36		Det løser sig
2012	"Venter" (Christian Brøns & Patrik Isaksson)	9		Under overfladen

Featured in

- 2011: "Du er den" (Denz feat. Christian Brøns)
