= UFO (musician) =

Danish hip hop artist (born 1981)

UFO (Kristian Humaidan)
- Born: Kristian Humaidan; 1981 (age 44–45); Svendborg, Denmark
- Genres: Rap, urban music, Danish pop
- Occupations: Singer, songwriter, rapper, musician
- Years active: 2001 – 2011 (as UFO & Yepha); 2011 – present (as solo)
- Formerly of: UFO Yepha

Kristian Humaidan (born 1981, Svendborg, Denmark), better known by his stage name UFO, is a Danish singer, rapper and hip hop artist. He was part of the rap duo UFO Yepha before splitting-up and going solo. With the split, UFO is noticeably branching into Danish music rather than hip hop as in the days with Yepha.

== 2002–2011: As UFO and Yepha ==
Kristian Humaidan (known as UFO) won the freestyle championship MC's Fight Night in 2002. Soon he started collaborating as a duo with Jeppe Bruun Wahlstrøm (known as Yepha, born 1983) through Svendborg, and later from Aarhus. They were also known as Whyyou (taking lead from first letters of their names). They had a good number of chart successes before they split-up as a duo in 2011.

They had three albums charting on the official Danish Albums Chart as follows:

- U vs. Y (2003 – reached #28)
- Ingen som os (2006 – reached #20)
- Kig mig i øjnene (2008 – reached #32)

They released many singles as UFO and Yepha including charting singles:

- "Hver dag" (2003, reached #1)
- "Næh næh" (Ufo Yepha feat. Anna David) (2008 – reached #20)
- "Stille og roligt knald pa" (2009, reached #27)

== 2011– : Solo career ==
UFO's debut album as a solo artist is Humaidan. It was released by Universal Music Denmark on 24 October 2011.

== Discography ==
=== Albums ===
(for albums as UFO Yepha details, see UFO Yepha)

Solo

Year	Title	Highest position	Certification
Year	Title	Denmark	Certification
2011	Humaidan	34	

=== Singles ===
(Selective and only charting singles) (for singles as UFO & Yepha details, see UFO & Yepha)

UFO (Solo)

Year	Single	Peak chart positions	Certifications	Album
Year	Single	Denmark	Certifications	Album
Danish Singles
2011	"Herligt spild af liv"	32		Humaidan
2011	"Sindssyg"	35		Humaidan
