= Anna David (singer) =

Danish R&B and soul singer

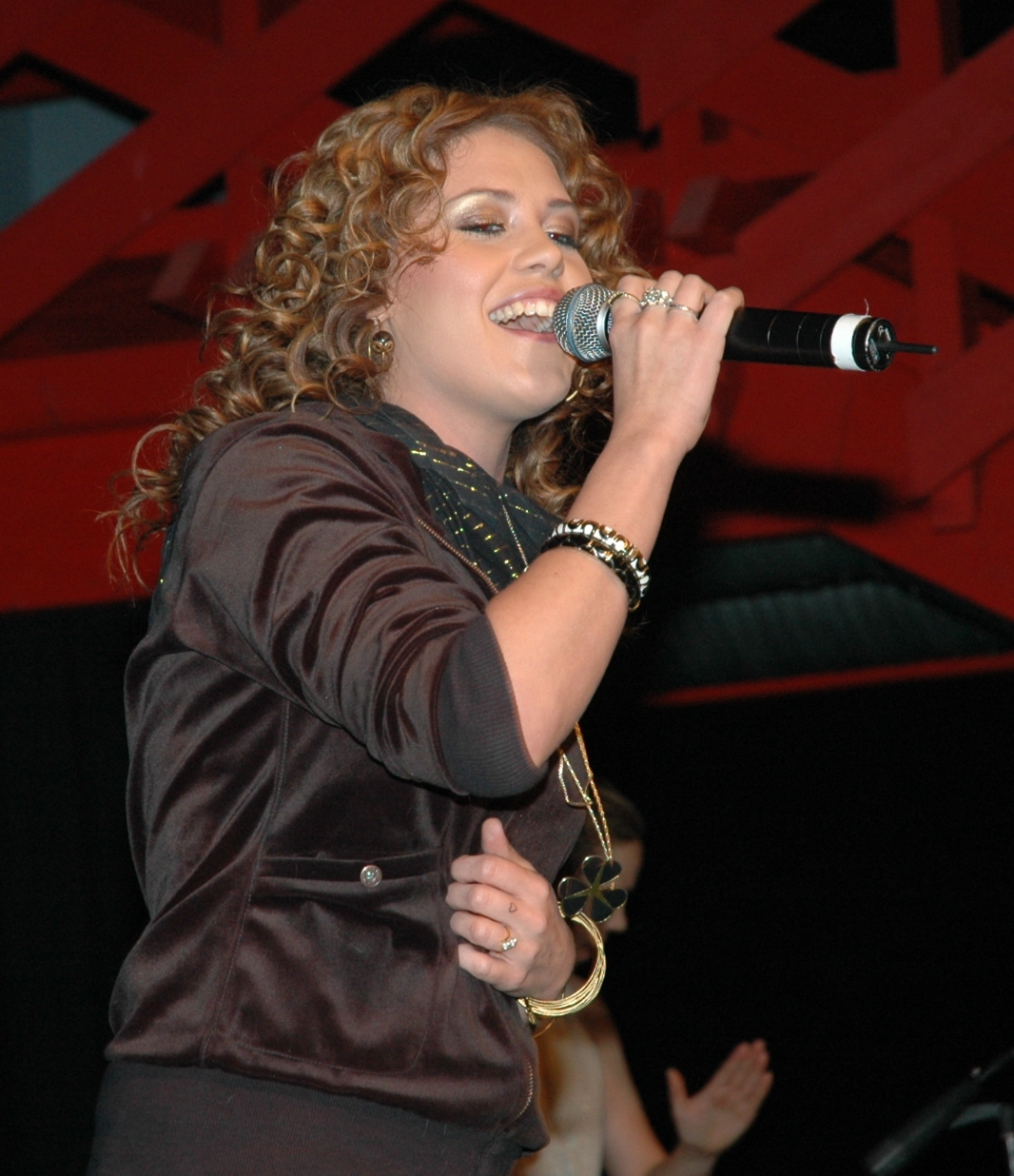

Background information
- Born: Anna David; 2 December 1984 (age 41); Århus, Denmark
- Genres: R&B, Soul
- Years active: 2000–2014; 2020-present
- Labels: Polydor Records/Iceberg Records (2000); Highlight/Zomba (2001–2002) n00b factory/Playground Music (2005–present); Smd Epc (SonyBMG) (2006–present)
- Website: http://www.annadavid.dk/

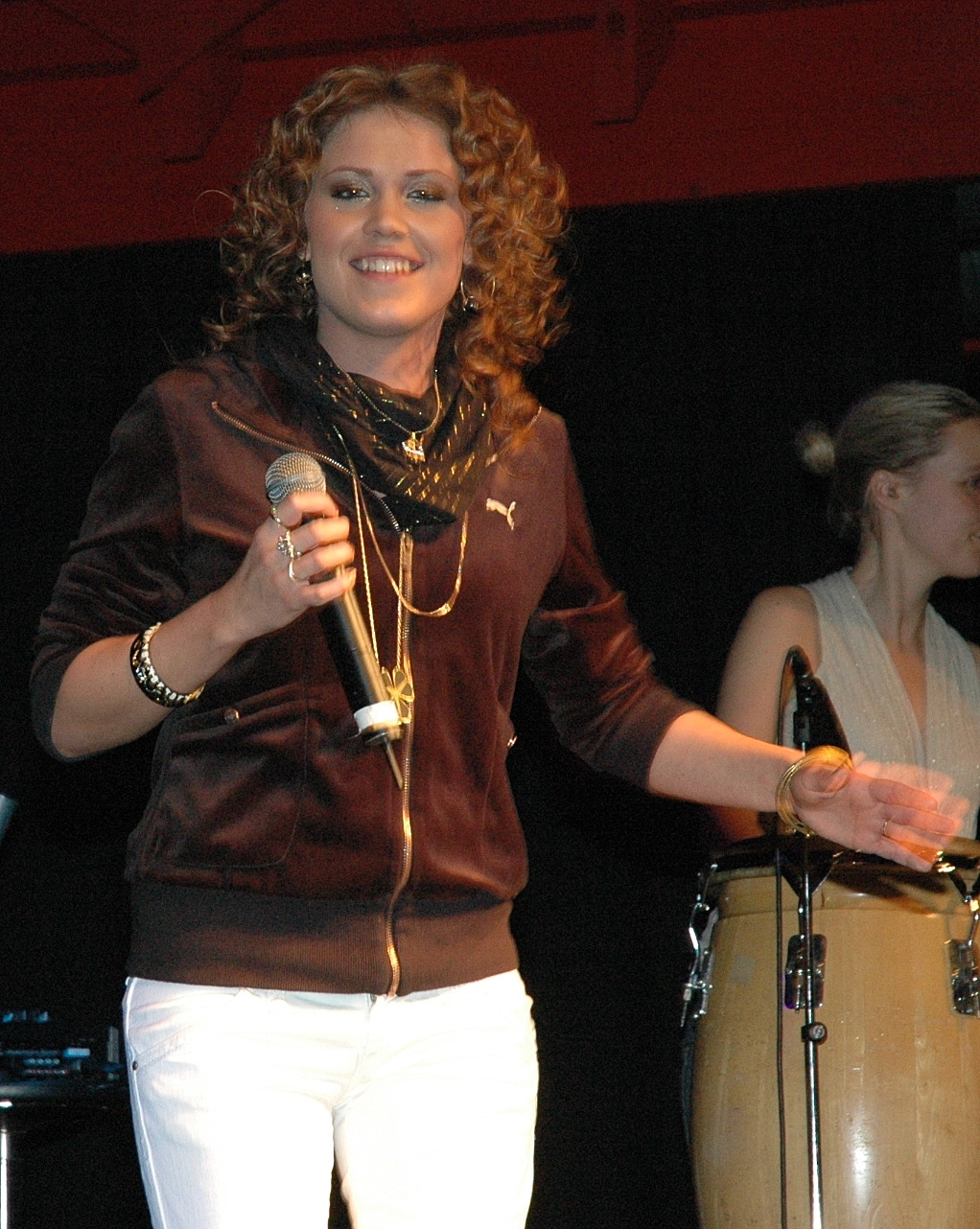

Anna David (born 2 December 1984) is a Danish R&B and soul singer. At the age of fourteen she got her first recording contract in Germany where she released five singles. Her debut album, Anna David, was released in Denmark in September 2005 and was certified Gold. The lead single, "Fuck dig", held the number-one position on Danish single chart for 12 weeks and received the 'Payload Prize 2005' for being the most downloaded song of the year in Denmark. In October 2006, David recorded "Fuck dig" in German as "Fick Dich". The German version entered the charts in both Germany and Austria. Simultaneously, she recorded "Fuck You", an English version of the song.

In 2006, she participated in the Danish version of Dancing with the Stars (Danish: Vild med dans).

== Discography ==
- 2005: Anna David
- 2007: 2
- 2009: Tættere på
- 2010: Music is Taking Over

== Singles ==
- 2000: "P.Y.B. (Pretty Young Boy)" with Christoph Brüx, Toni Cottura
- 2001: "U and Me and the Sunshine"
- 2002: "Impossible"
- 2002: "Terminal Love"
- 2005: "Fuck dig" ("Fuck deg" in Norwegian covered by Sichelle)
  - 2006: "Fuck You" (in English)
  - 2006: "Fick Dich" (in German)
- 2005: "Hvad nu hvis?"
- 2006: "Når musikken spiller"
- 2006: "Kys mig"
- 2007: "Nr. 1"
- 2007: "Chill"
- 2007: "Den lille pige"
- 2009: "Tæt på"
- 2009: "Den sommer"
- 2009: "All About Love" featuring Mohamed Ali
- 2010: "Bow (for the Bad Girls)"
- 2014: "It Hurts"
- 2020: "Tag Top"

=== Other songs ===
- "Mavepuster" – Jokeren featuring Anna David from Jokeren's album Jigolo Jesus
- "My Sunshine" – Demo song presented on her MySpace
- "Næh næh" – Single by Ufo Yepha feat. Anna David on their album Kig mig i øjnene
- "Flip Reverse" – B-Side to the "Fick Dich" single
- "You Drive Me Crazy" – B-Side to the "Impossible" and "Terminal Love" singles
- "Recognise Me" – B-Side to the "Terminal Love" single
- "Drop Mobning" – A version of "Fuck Dig" with different lyrics, used for the '"Drop Mobning" campaign
