= Toppen af Poppen =

Danish reality television series

Toppen af Poppen is a Danish reality television series broadcast on Danish television station TV 2 as part of The Best Singers series and is based on the Dutch series De beste zangers van Nederland. Ten seasons have been broadcast thus far with the inaugural series launched on 7 February 2011.

== Season 1 ==
The first Danish season of Toppen af Poppen included the following artists: Erann DD, Lars H.U.G., Szhirley, Dorthe Kollo, Anna David and Jokeren.

On 18 March 2011, a compilation album entitled Toppen af Poppen was released including some of the best performances from the series reaching #4 on the Danish Albums Chart.

Artist of the day	Szhirley	Lars H.U.G.	Anna David	Jokeren	Dorthe Kollo	Erann DD
Szhirley	"171 kilometer"	"Skibet skal sejle i nat", feat. Szhirley	"Don't Look for Love"	"Engleben (Havfruen)"	"Gammel Kongevej"	"I Close My Eyes and Think of You"
Lars H.U.G.	"Kysser himlen farvel"	"Backwards"	"Natsværmer"	"Elsker dig for evigt"	"Mon de kan reparere dig"	"Hvorfor Er lykken så lunefuld"
Anna David	"Uden ord"	"Dansevise", feat. Anna David	"If You Wanna Cry"	"Bow"	"Tæt på"	"Chill"
Jokeren	"Kvinde din"	"Så længe jeg lever", feat. Jokeren	"Spændt op til lir", feat. Szhirley	"Sig ja", feat. Erann DD	"Havnen"	"Den dræbende joke"
Dorthe Kollo	"Gid du var i Skanderborg"	"Når lygterne tændes", feat. Dorthe Kollo	"Velkommen til verden"	"Mit navn er Peter (Gid du var i Skanderborg)"	"Er De greven fra Luxembourg?"	"Piphans"
Erann DD	"Still Believing"	"Itsi Bitsi", feat. Erann DD	"You Better Believe"	"Når hjertet ser"	"I Wanna Wake Up with You"	"Lulli"

== Season 2 ==
Due to the huge popularity of the first series, a second series was launched the same year and started on 23 August 2011 also on TV 2.

On 3 October 2011, a compilation album of best performances was released under the title Toppen af Poppen 2 reaching the top of the Danish Albums Chart. The songs in bold are own songs interpreted by the original artist.

Date	Artist of the day	Søs Fenger	Joey Moe	Anne Linnet	Brødrene Olsen	Lina Rafn	Rasmus Nøhr	Sys Bjerre
August 23	Søs Fenger	"**Er det så forbi**"	"Inderst inde"	"Jeg elsker dig"	"Kun et kys herfra"	"Tivoli i regnvejr"	"Holder øje med dig"	"Du er"
August 30	Joey Moe	"Du' en ener"	"**Dobbeltslag**"	"Skakmat (Baby det' for sent nu)"	"Cheating"	"Yo Yo"	"Joey Moes Taverna"	"Jorden er gittig"
September 13	Anne Linnet	"Barndommens gade"	"Venus"	"**Lever nok endnu en dag**"	"1000 stykker"	"Forårsdag"	"Verden er imod os"	"Tabt mit hjerte"
September 20	Brødrene Olsen	"San Francisco"	"Walk Right Back"	"Smuk som et stjerneskud/Anne Linnets stjerneskud"	**Brdr. Olsen-medley**	"Marie Marie"	"Angelina"	"Plastic Fantastic"
September 27	Lina Rafn (Infernal)	"From Paris to Berlin"	"Whenever You Need Me"	"Pistolskud"	"Ten Miles"	"**Love Is All**"	"Downtown Boys"	"Electric Light"
October 4	Rasmus Nøhr	"Den generte dreng"	"Fra kæreste til grin"	"Jylland (Sjælland)"	"Sommer i Europa"	"Sød musik"	"**Øl på Bryggen**"	"Alderspræsident"
October 18	Sys Bjerre	"Kegle"	"Cand. mag. Fugl Fønix"	"Giv mig noget (Pik)"	"Malene"	"Alle mine veninder"	"Kære farmor"	"**All You Need Is Love**"

== Season 3 ==
The third season of the show was filmed in Mallorca in April 2012. Season 3 was broadcast starting 14 August 2012 and continued until 25 September on TV 2.

On 24 October 2012, a compilation album of best performances was released under the title Toppen af Poppen 3.

The songs in bold are own songs interpreted by the original artist.

Date	Artist of the day	Sanne Salomonsen	Johnson	Mads Langer	Peter Belli	Nabiha	Kasper Winding	Dicte
August 14	Sanne Salomonsen	"**Hjem**"	"Sui Sui"	"Overgi'r mig langsomt"	"Taxa"	"Voodoo"	"Kærligheden kalder"	"Det ikke det du siger"
August 21	Johnson	"Kig forbi"	"**Hovedrollen**"	"Ik' Hate"	"Bawler hele dagen"	"Det passer"	"Kender du det"	"Teriyaki"
August 28	Mads Langer	"Too close"	"Fact/Fiction"	"**Fact-Fiction**"	"Last Flower"	"Microscope"	"Wake Me Up in Time"	"You're Not Alone"
September 4	Peter Belli	"Ulven Peter"	"Ingen regning"	"København"	"**Pappa**"	"Roll over Beatles"	"Et underligt stof"	"Blækspruttesangen"
September 11	Nabiha	"Cracks in the Concrete"	"The Enemy"	"Deep Sleep"	"Trouble"	"**Never Played the Bass**"	"You"	"Never Played the Bass"
September 18	Kasper Winding	"Sjæl i flammer"	"Fuck Dance Let's Art"	"Alle har en drøm"	"Lidt til og meget mer'"	"Don't Take the Sunshine"	"**Down the River High**"	"Kom nu hjem"
September 25	Dicte	"Cinema Café"	"Make It Alright"	"If This Is Cool"	"Touch"	"U-Turn"	"She Is Wild"	"**No**"

== Season 4 ==
The fourth season of Toppen af Poppen was shown in the autumn of 2014. The show was recorded on the Danish island of Bornholm.

Date	Artist of the day	Jorgen Klubien	Wafande	Anne Dorte Michelsen	Clemens	Barbara Moleko	Rasmus Walter	Poul Krebs
August 17	Jorgen Klubien (Danseorkestret)	-	"Regndans"	"Himmel og jord"	"Kom tilbage nu"	"Sidste skrig"	"Alt er dit"	"Jeg prøver igen"
August 24	Wafande	"Uartig"	-	"Gi' mig et smil"	"Django"	"Lang vej hjem"	"Drik ud"	"Kom ned til vandet"
August 31	Anne Dorte Michelsen	"Før eller siden"	"Sig du ka' li' mig"	-	"En (u)lykkelig familie"	"Indianer"	"Jeg har lagt mine våben"	"Ud under åben himmel"
September 7	Clemens	"Du lever dit liv"	"Har de noget at sige"	"Uanset hvad I siger"	-	"Lad dem hænge"	"Ingen kender dagen"	"Byen sover"
September 14	Barbara Moleko	"Jeg åben"	"Lykken er"	"Kvinder og kanoner"	"Rejser mig op"	-	"Dum for dig"	"Gå en tur"
September 21	Rasmus Walter	"Bullet"	"Endeløst"	"Vi ku' blive"	"Hvad sku' vi her vi to"	"Take It As It Comes"	-	"Is It Pretty"
September 28	Poul Krebs	"Skabet"	"Morrison, Dylan og Elvis"	"Jeg la'r min dør stå lidt på klem"	"Johnny han var lige ved at blive sindsyg"	"Sådan nogen som os"	"Her langs muren"	-

== Season 5 ==
The fifth season premiered on TV 2 in the autumn of 2015. The show was recorded in May 2015 at Skagen.

Date	Artist of the day	Shaka Loveless	Lars Lilholt	Mattias Kolstrup	Oh Land	Isam B	Stine Bramsen	Sebastian
August 16	Shaka Loveless	-	"Tomgang"	"Mother Nature" ("Ikke mere tid")	"Dans din idiot"	"Græder for mit kvarter"	Let It Soak" ("Dengang du græd")	"Ville ikke gå"
August 23	Lars Lilholt	"Et folk, et menneske"	-	"Kald det kærlighed"	"Der står et træ"	"For at tænde lys"	"Hvor går vi hen, når vi går"	"Jeg vil være stjerne"
August 30	Mattias Kolstrup (Dúné)	"80 Years"	"Farvel min elskede" ("Let Go of Your Love")	-	"Heiress of Valentina"	"Bloodlines"	"Dry Lips"	"The World is Where We're Heading (Stages)"
September 6	Oh Land	"White Nights"	"Måneulv" ("Wolf and I")	"Sun of a Gun"	-	"Break the Chain"	"Speak Out Now"	"Rainbow"
September 13	Isam B (Outlandish)	"Look Into My Eyes"	"Jeg ber til Gud" ("I Only Ask of God")	"Ready to Love"	"Aicha"	-	"Mind Full of Whispers"	"Hver sin vej"
September 27	Stine Bramsen	"What is happening"	"Hjem til Silkeborg" ("Prototypical")	"Fascination"	"The Spell"	"The Day You Leave Me"	-	"Den dag du går fra mig" ("The Day You Leave Me")
October 3	Sebastian	"Når lyset bryder frem"	"Rose"	"80'ernes boheme"	"Ulvesangen"	"Måske ku' vi"	"Stille før storm"	-

== Season 6 ==
The sixth season of Toppen af Poppen premiered on August 28, 2016 on TV 2. The show was recorded at Samsø in the spring of 2016.

Date	Artist of the day	Ida Corr	Peter A.G. Nielsen	Fallulah	Djämes Braun	Lau Højen	Troels Gustavsen	Hanne Boel
August 28	Ida Corr	-	"Spejlene inde i musikken" ("I Found Her")	"I Found Her"	"Sjus"	"Let Me Think about It"	"Time"	"Down"
September 4	Peter A.G. Nielsen (Gnags)	"Når jeg bliver gammel"	-	"Danmark"	"Den dejligste morgen"	"Jeg elsker dig"	"Lav sol over Århus"	"Havnen med skibe"
September 11	Fallulah	"We All Need Water"	"Dette gudsforladte sted" ("Perfect Tense")	-	"Slaveri" ("Work Song")	"Out of It"	"Dried Out Cities"	"I Lay My Head"
September 18	Djämes Braun	"Farlig tiger"	"Fugle"	"Lytter ik' til dem"	-	"Ejer det"	"Barn igen"	"Inficeret"
September 25	Lau Højen (Carpark North)	"Within My Reach"	"Fri mig fra mig selv" ("Save Me from Myself")	"Transparent and Glasslike"	"Taknemmelig" ("Shall We Be Grateful")	-	"Everything Starts Again"	"Fireworks"
October 2	Troels Gustavsen (Noah)	"Over byen"	"Alt er forbi"	"Endnu en nat"	"På vej hjem"	"Far, vågn op" ("Soon")	-	"Times"
October 9	Hanne Boel	"Talk It Out"	"Ikke særligt meget.." ("Don't Know Much About Love")	"Son of a Preacher Man"	"Lyset indeni" ("Light in Your Heart")	"I Wanna Make Love to You"	"All It Takes"	-

== Season 7 ==
The seventh season of Toppen af Poppen premiered on August 27, 2017 on TV 2. The show was recorded at Kerteminde.

Date	Artist of the day	Karl William	Michael Falch	Aura Dione	Caroline Henderson	Søren Huss	Dorthe Gerlach	Burhan G
August 27	Karl William	-	"Skinner"	"Syredronning"	"Rammer perfekt"	"Alt er fint"	"Tale om noget"	"Blind igen"
September 3	Michael Falch	"Ud af mørket"	-	"I et land uden høje bjerge"	"Nær"	"Tak For dansen"	"Mød mig i mørket"	"Den eneste i verden"
September 10	Aura	"In Love with the World"	"Song for Sophie"	-	"Glass Bone Crash"	"Something from Nothing"	"Love Somebody"	"Into the Wild"
September 17	Caroline Henderson	"Made in Europe"	"Faster"	"Vil du være min i nat"	-	"Efterår"	"Alt i alt"	"Jeg vil la' lyset brænde"
September 24	Søren Huss (Saybia)	"Du Er"	"Vogt dig"	"I Surrender"	"Tak for dansen"	-	"Et hav af udstrakte hænder"	"The Second You Sleep"
October 1	Dorthe Gerlach (Hush)	"Natlys"	"Assistensen"	"Same Old Story"	"Say a Little Prayer"	"Ingers ting"	-	"Drown"
October 8	Burhan G	"Din for evigt"	"Playground"	"Jeg vil ha' dig for mig selv"	"Who Is He"	"Mest ondt"	"I stedet for dig"	-

== Season 8 ==
The eighth season of Toppen af Poppen premiered on August 26, 2018 on TV 2. The show was recorded at Stege.

Date	Artist of the day	Søren Sko	Thøger Dixgaard	Pernille Rosendahl	Silas Bjerregaard	Annika Aakjær	Claus Hempler	Lis Sørensen
August 26	Søren Sko	-	"Familiar Roads"	"I'm the Other"	"Pigen & Delfinen (Dolphin Girl)"	"Hvis du spørger (Don't Ask Me)"	"Dreamer"	"Lang Og Ensom nat (On a Long Lonely Night)"
September 2	Thøger Dixgaard	"Come Do Me Over (Former)"	-	"Lydløs"	"Duer & Musik"	"Jeg Vil Se Dig Græde / Pæn"	"Hvornår"	"Blød Indeni"
September 9	Pernille Rosendahl	"What Is Love?"	"Tomorrow Never Dies"	-	"Flowers In The Wintertime"	"Er det det? (Is This It?)"	"Rabbit Hole"	"Hold dit hjerte varmt (Love Will Keep You Warm)"
September 16	Silas Bjerregaard (Turboweekend)	"Trouble Is"	"Træk Stikket Ud"	"On My Side"	-	"Sig det Nu (I Forgot)"	"Levitate"	"Miles"
September 23	Annika Aakjær	"Lykkens Gang"	"Skulder Ved skulder"	"Min Pris"	"Jeg Gi'r"	-	"Dagens Tekst"	"Alt Hvad Jeg Vil Sige"
September 30	Claus Hempler	"Shine"	"King of Slapstick"	"Ride Upon the Storm"	"Kiss the Bride"	"Stjernestøv og Nostalgi (Stardust Nostalgia)"	-	"Alle ved besked" (Cover af Leonard Cohens "Everybody Knows")
October 7	Lis Sørensen	"One More Minute (Indtil Dig Igen)"	"Tæt På Ækvator"	"Mine Øjne Se Skal Se"	"Stille Før Storm"	"Morgensol / Dejlig Dreng"	"Tango"	-

== Season 9 ==
The ninth season of Toppen af Poppen premiered on August 18, 2019 on TV 2. The show was recorded at Fanø.

Date	Artist of the day	Anders Blichfeldt	Carl Emil Petersen	Kwamie Liv	Chief 1	Cæcilie Norby	Medina	Teitur
August 18	Anders Blichfeldt	-	"Silkestemme (Female Voice)"	"Losing You"	"I Would Die For You"	"Sittin' In A Window"	"Den Jeg Er"	"Hat"
August 25	Carl Emil Petersen	"Halvnøgen"	-	"København"	"Tusinde Veje Du Kan Ta'"	"Frit Land"	"Blodets Bånd”	"Navn I Sne"
September 1	Kwamie Liv	"Blasé"	"Fortabt I En Pige" ("Lost In A Girl")	-	"Blindt Hjerte" ("Did")	"Pleasure This Pain"	"Hele Vejen" ("Higher")	"New Boo"
September 8	Chief 1	"Engel"	"Si Senor"	"Sommernætter"	-	"Pletfri Solskin"	"Man Skal Dø Lidt (Før Man Finder Vej)"	"Nej Til Narkotika"
September 15	Cæcilie Norby	"Zoeanne"	"Midt I En Drøm"	"Hymnen"	"Cuban Cigars"	-	"Glemt"	"Night Road"
September 22	Medina	"Det Smukkeste"	"Vi To"	"Kun For Mig"	"Synd For Dig"	"Jalousi"	-	"For Altid"
September 29	Teitur	"Looking For A Place"	"Syner"	"The Singer"	"Stella (Catherine The Waitress)"	"Josephine"	"One And Only"	-

== Season 10 ==
The ninth season of Toppen af Poppen premiered on August 30, 2020 on TV 2. The show was recorded at Tisvilde. This tenth season of the show is different, celebrating its 10 years with an anniversary format with 25 artists from previous seasons on rotation in every episode.

=== Episode 1: August 30, 2020 ===
Artist	Burhan G	Michael Falch	Wafande	Oh Land	Søs Fenger	Barbara Moleko
Song (Artist)	"Du Er" (Søs Fenger)	"Nu Si'r Du Fra (Speak Out Now)" (Oh Land)	"Gadedreng" (Barbara Moleko)	"Nær" (Michael Falch)	"Mest Ondt" (Burhan G)	"Se Mig I Dag" (Wafande)

=== Episode 2: September 6, 2020 ===
Artist	Michael Falch	Annika Aakjær	Mads Langer	Teitur	Søs Fenger	Barbara Moleko	Burhan G
Song (Artist)	"Lucy" (Burhan G)	"De Vildeste Fugle" (Michael Falch)	"I Was Just Thinking" (Teitur)	"Alt Hvad Jeg Ville Sige" (Annika Aakjær)	"Dum For Dig" (Barbara Moleko)	"Inderst Inde" (Søs Fenger)	"Fact-Fiction" (Mads Langer)

=== Episode 3: September 13, 2020 ===
Artist	Annika Aakjær	Burhan G	Medina	Lau Højen	Anne Dorte Michelsen	Anders Blichfeldt
Song (Artist)	"København - Copenhagen" (Lau Højen - Carpark North)	"For Altid" (Medina)	"Ud Under Åben Himmel" (Anne Dorte Michelsen - Tøsedrengene)	"Bonsoir Madame" (Anders Blichfeldt - Big Fat Snake)	"Skulder Ved Skulder (Annika Aakjær)	"Sig Du Ka' Li Mig" (Anne Dorte Michelsen - Tøsedrengene)

=== Episode 4: September 20, 2020 ===
Artist	Annika Aakjær	Anders Blichfeldt	Caroline Henderson	Lau Højen	Poul Krebs	Medina
Song (Artist)	"Mindre Ensom Nu (A Little Less Loneliness)" (Anders Blichfeldt - Big Fat Snake)	"Made In Europe" (Caroline Henderson)	"Håb" (Lau Højen - Carpark North)	"Kun For Mig" (Medina)	"Jed Ved" (Annika Aakjær)	"Sådan Nogen Som Os" (Poul Krebs)

=== Episode 5: September 27, 2020 ===
Artist	Dorthe Gerlach	Poul Krebs	Medina	Rasmus Walter	Caroline Henderson	Kwamie Liv
Song (Artist)	"Morgendagens Tåber" (Poul Krebs)	"Som Vinden I September - Back in Place" (Dorthe Gerlach - Hush)	"Knust Glas" (Rasmus Walter)	"Kys Mig Kys Mig - Kiss Me Kiss Me" (Caroline Henderson)	"Lyser i Mørke" (Medina)	"Finder Vej" (Rasmus Walter)

=== Episode 6: October 4, 2020 ===
Artist	Rasmus Walter	Kwamie Liv	Claus Hempler	Lars Lilholt	Dorthe Gerlach	Søren Huss
Song (Artist)	"Et Hav Af Udstrakte Hænder" (Søren Huss)	"Jeg Drømmer Om En Sang" (Claus Hempler)	"Levende" (Lars H.U.G.)	"Gik I Byen Med Det Grimme Hold - New Boo" (Kwamie Liv)	"Natsværmer" (Lars H.U.G.)	"Kald Det Kærlighed" (Lars Lilholt)

=== Episode 7: October 11, 2020 ===
Artist	Stine Bramsen og Søren Huss	Ida Corr	Søren Huss	Jokeren	Kwamie Liv	Lars H.U.G., Stine Bramsen, Ida Corr, Søren Huss, Jokeren og Kwamie Liv
Song (Artist)	"Backwards" (Lars H.U.G.)	"Tro, Håb og Kærlighed - Can't Let it Go" (Stine Bramsen)	"En Skygge I Dit Kropssprog - Higher" (Kwamie Liv)	"Jeg Dagdrømte Om Os I Nat - Make Them Beg" (Ida Corr)	"An Ordinary Day - ET Helt Almindeligt Liv" (Søren Huss)	"Altid Lys" (Lars H.U.G.)

== Discography ==
=== Albums ===
Title	Album details	Peak position	Certification
Title	Album details	DEN	Certification
Toppen af Poppen	Release date: 18 March 2011; Record label: Sony Music; Formats: CD, download	4	
Toppen af Poppen 2	Release date: 3 October 2011; Record label: Sony Music; Formats: CD, download	1	Platinum
Toppen af Poppen Vol. 3	Release date: 24 October 2012; Record label: Sony Music; Formats: CD, download	2	

=== Extended plays ===
Title	Extended play details	Peak position	Certification
Title	Extended play details	DEN	Certification
Toppen af Poppen – Fortolken Søs Fenger	Release date: 23 August 2011; Record label: Sony Music; Format: Download	11	
Toppen af Poppen – Fortolken Joey Moe	Release date: 30 August 2011; Record label: Sony Music; Format: Download	11	
Toppen af Poppen – Synger Sebastian (Live)	Release date: 4 October 2015; Record label: Sony Music; Format: Download	24	
Toppen af Poppen – Synger Gnags (Live)	Release date: 4 September 2016; Record label: Sony Music; Format: Download	34	
Toppen af Poppen – Synger Djämes Braun (Live)	Release date: 18 September 2016; Record label: Sony Music; Format: Download	37	
Toppen af Poppen – Synger Caroline Henderson	Release date: 17 September 2017; Record label: Sony Music; Format: Download	24	

== See also ==
- The Best Singers (series)
