= Sebastian (singer) =

Danish singer, guitarist and composer

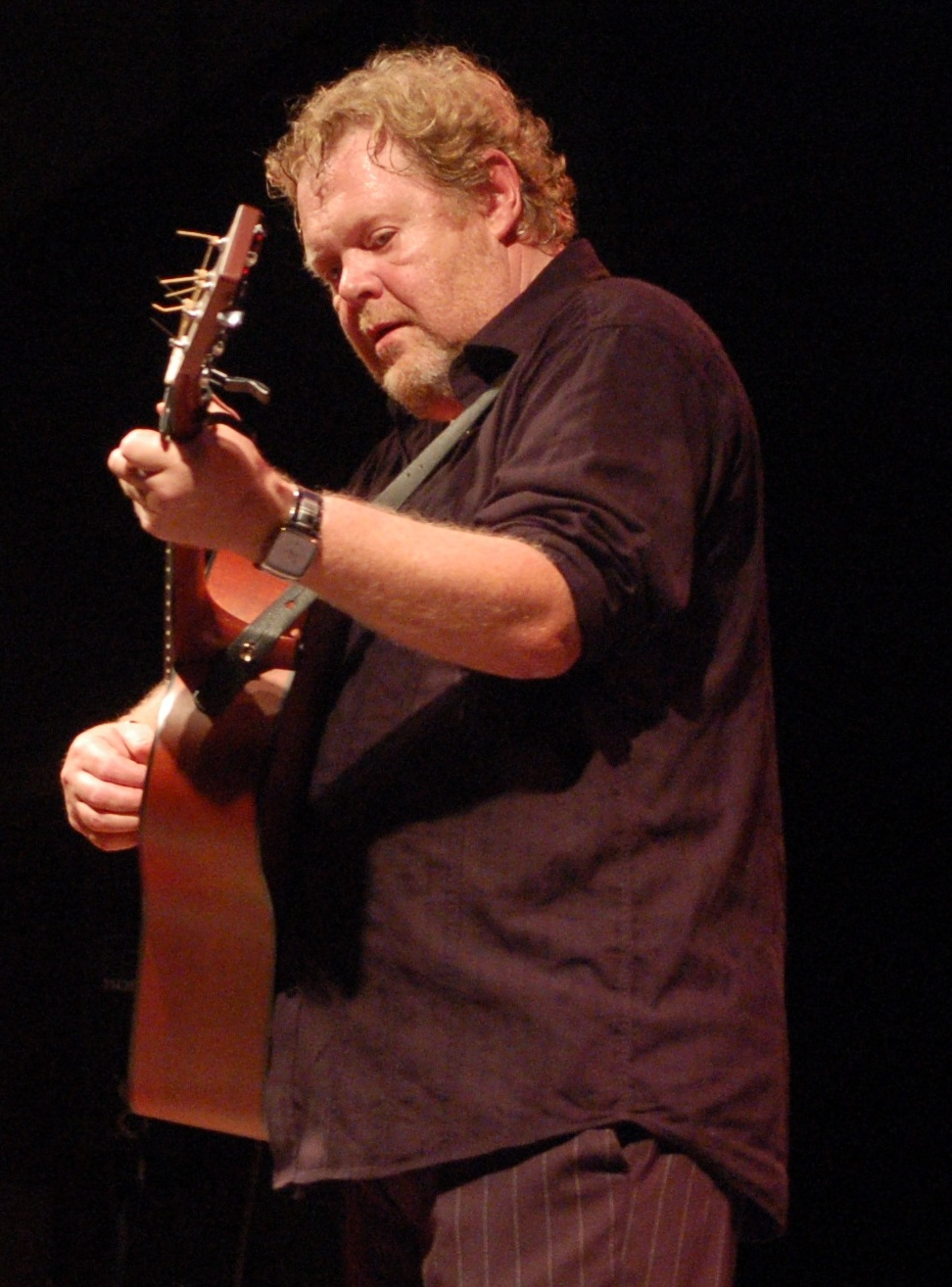
- Sebastian at the 2006 Tønder Festival.

Background information
- Also known as: Sebastian
- Born: Knud Torben Grabow Christensen; 19 December 1949 (age 75)
- Origin: Sønderborg, Denmark
- Genres: Folk rock, pop rock, musical
- Occupation(s): Musician, singer, songwriter
- Instrument(s): Vocals, acoustic guitar
- Years active: 1967–present
- Website: https://sebastianfan.dk/

Knud Grabow Christensen (born 19 December 1949), better known by his stage name Sebastian, is a Danish singer, guitarist and songwriter.

Sebastian started playing guitar in 1966, and started writing songs in 1967. Since having worked in the folk rock genre in the 1970s, he became one of the most prominent pop rock musicians in Denmark and has scored numerous films and plays. His releases have reached combined sales of over 2.5 million copies since 1971. His singing voice began weakening in the end of the 1980s, because of bad health. He is still active, and has made several popular albums. So far, his career has spanned more than five decades.

== Career ==
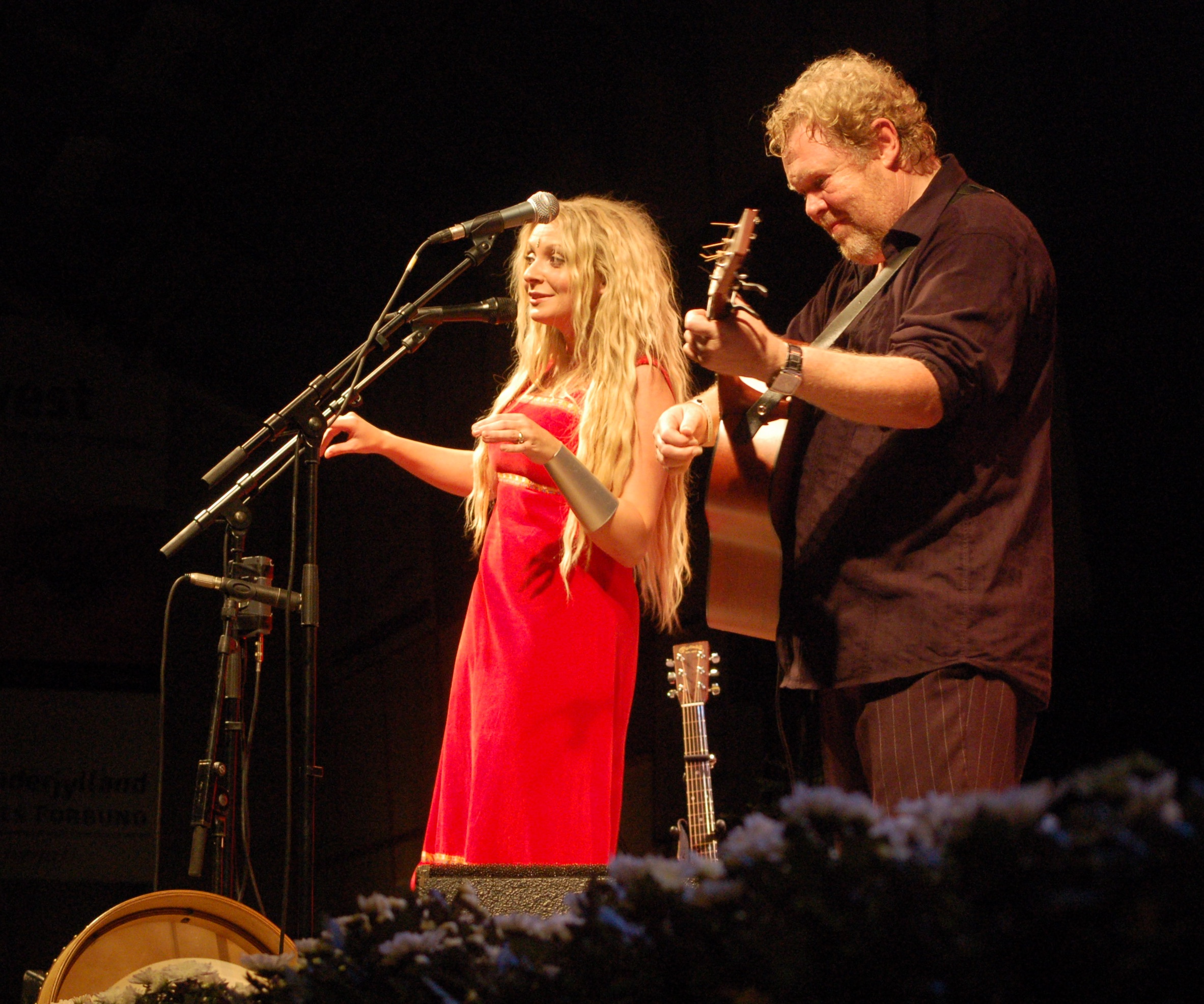
Sebastian performing with Eivør Pálsdóttir at the 2006 Tønder Festival.

Sebastian began his career in the end of the 1960s, where he traveled about with a bus for amateur competitions, arranged by a businessman for small concerts in Denmark. Some others from the bus wanted to record a single, and Sebastian participated with this group called Night and Day. Although the single was never recorded. Inspired by the Scottish singer and songwriter Donovan (born 1946), Sebastian recorded a couple of English-language singles released in 1970, as well as the album The Goddess released in 1971. The album had limited success with sales of around 10,000 copies, so Sebastian began to write songs in Danish about 1971. His first Danish song was Lossepladsen bløder (partly inspired by Bob Dylan's "Desolation Row" from the album Highway 61 Revisited), which was released as a maxi single that year.

Sebastian's major commercial breakthrough in the music industry came when his first Danish-language LP Den store flugt was released on 17 October 1972, which was praised as a "Donovan-like Dylan" among other things in the reviews back then. Den store flugt was right below the 32,000 sold copies of Denmark's best-selling album that year, namely Olsen by the Olsen Brothers. Den store flugt has had extensive sales that are problematic to certify, but estimated to be 100,000 to 170,000 copies by music critic and journalist Torben Bille, in cooperation with Sebastian. Sebastian contacted Ina Løndahl around 1973, after having listened to her perform in a Danish rendition of the musical Godspell. EMI financed the record Menneske min ven by Ina, which was released on 14 September 1973. Sebastian collaborated as a songwriter, and had the melody for the title song in advance, which was left over from an earlier musical project. Sebastian's next album Over havet under himlen was released in November 1973, quickly reached first place on Ekstra Bladet's record chart and has reached sales of around 50,000 copies. Blød lykke released in October 1974, and Gøgleren, Anton og de andre released in October 1975, respectively have estimated sales of 60,000 and 40,000 copies. The subsequent album Måske ku' vi (1976) from the film of the same name is estimated as 80,000 copies sold. Sebastian established himself as one of the most significant songwriters in Danish rock, with roots in his folk rock-inspired music.

Although, Sebastian's musical style was gradually expanded since the end of the 1970s, with refined use of a synthesizer (often played by Kenneth Knudsen) among other things. Sebastian's lyrics were sometimes political in keeping with the spirit of the times, but with an eye to poetic artistry. In 1979, he recorded his own music to texts of Bertolt Brecht on the album Tiderne skifter, which was released in March 1979, got positive reviews and has sold approximately 100,000 copies. He recorded music to texts of Bertolt Brecht again in 1988 with the play named The Good Person of Szechwan (Danish: Det gode menneske fra Sezuan). During the 1970s and '80s, he had big hits, for example "Når lyset bryder frem" (1972), "Hvis du tror du er noget" (1972), "Du er ikke alene" (1978) from the film of the same name, and especially "Romeo" from the album Stjerne til støv, which was released in 1981. Stjerne til støv has estimated sales of 130,000 to 170,000 copies. The next album 80'ernes boheme from 1983 continued the success, with 100,000 to 150,000 copies sold. In 1987, he recorded the song "Vårvise" with Sissel Kyrkjebø. Sissel is also on his album named Et eventyr, which was released on 30 August 1989.

In 2015, Sebastian said "Around 1986-1987, I start to lose my voice, and it disappears completely at some point. It was a mixture of damp basement, too many smokes and an unhealthy lifestyle". Since that time in the 1980s, he has written multiple Danish musicals and songs for other singers, with great success.

In 2013, Jan Christian Mollestad produced a documentary film about Sebastian named Du er ikke alene – filmen om Sebastian. In 2015, he participated in Toppen af Poppen, and his popularity increased afterwards, especially with the younger audience.

== Awards ==
Sebastian received "Gramex-prisen" in 1979, "DJBFA's hæderspris" in 1982, "Wilhelm Hansen Fondens Hæderspris" in 1996, and is granted subsidies from the Danish Arts Foundation.

His album with songs for Astrid Lindgren's Ronia, the Robber's Daughter (Danish: Ronja Røverdatter) received a Danish grammy award in 1992, for best Danish children's release of the year. In 2004, Sebastian received "IFPIs Ærespris" at the Danish Music Awards. In 2006, his album Stjerne til støv (1981) entered the Danish Culture Canon. He received "Pionerprisen" at Årets Steppeulv in 2008. In 2012, his album Øjeblikkets mester received the prize for Danish vox pop release of the year at the Danish Music Awards.

In 2019, he received "Polka Verner Legat", which was founded by Søs Egelind and Kirsten Lehfeldt in 2002, and is granted annually at Smukfest to a distinct Danish cultural person. With the prize, 190,000 Danish kroner were granted.

== Discography ==
=== Studio albums ===
- The Goddess (1971)
- Den store flugt (1972)
- Over havet under himlen (1973)
- Blød lykke (1974)
- Gøgleren, Anton og de andre (1975)
- Måske ku' vi (1976)
- Ulvehøjen (1977)
- Ikke alene Danmark (1978)
- Tiderne skifter (1979)
- Cirkus fantastica (1979)
- Nattergalen (1980)
- Stjerne til støv (1981)
- 80'ernes boheme (1983)
- Tusind og én nat (1984)
- Skatteøen (1986)
- På vulkaner (1987)
- Det gode menneske fra Sezuan (1988)
- Skatten på Sjørøverøya (1988)
- Et eventyr (1989)
- Piratpladen: Demoindspilninger '77-'87 (1990)
- Miraklernes tid (1990)
- Ronja Røverdatter (1991)
- Gøngehøvdingen (1992)
- Cyrano (1993)
- Aladdin (1995)
- Hans Christian Andersen (1996)
- Pippi (1998)
- Den nye Cyrano (2000)
- Klokkeren fra Notre Dame (2002)
- Jernbyrd (2007)
- Øjeblikkets mester (2011)
- I Danmark er jeg født (2012)
- Hodja fra pjort: Sangene (2014)
- Sange til drømmescenariet (2017)
- Hun nåede at klappe hunden (2019)
- Tidløs erindring (2021)
- Dengang det var før (2022)
- Hjertedanser (2023)

=== Singles and EPs ===
- Babe, I Can Carry Your Tombstone / I Won't Do It, Mama (1970)
- Rocking Chair Observation / Give Me a Little Peace (1970)
- Lossepladsen bløder (1971)
- Når lyset bryder frem (1972)
- Hvis du tror du er noget / Rose (1972)
- Hey Ho (1973)
- Vascomat-Liza (1973)
- Flyv Lykkefugl (1974)
- Mona, Månen er blå / Blød lykke (1974)
- Farvel (Nu' du helt din egen) (1975)
- Gøgleren (1975)
- Måske ku' vi (1976)
- I morgen kommer aldrig (1976)
- Her er en sang / Ansigt til ansigt (1977)
- Du er ikke alene (1978)
- Den lille malkeko (1979)
- Romeo (1981)
- Topsy (1983)
- 80'ernes boheme (1983)
- Hodja fra Pjort (1985)
- Afrika (Vi er børn af samme jord) (1985)
- Vårvise / Summertime (1987)

=== Live/compilation albums ===
- Den store flugt / Over havet under himlen / Blød lykke (1974)
- Når lyset bryder frem (1976)
- Sebastian i Montmartre (1978)
- Live (1980)
- First Time Around (1981)
- Her er en sang - og 20 andre (1982)
- Flyv lykkefugl (1983)
- Den danske sang: Opsamling '81-'85 (1985)
- 26 hits (1988)
- Hjerternes sange, roser & torne: De 75 bedste sange fra 1970-92 (1992)
- Dejavu (1995)
- Romeo-serenader (1999)
- Sangskatten I (2007)
- Sangskatten II (2007)
- Sangskatten III (2007)
- De største hits (2009)
- Sange fra dengang (2010)
- Så blidt til stede (2015)
- De bedste sange (2015)
- De allerbedste børnesange (2019)
- De allerstørste sange (2019)
- Live: Hele vejen (2020)

== Collaboration ==
Notable collaboration with another singer arranged by release titles, release years and artists.

- Lis Sørensen: Tiderne skifter (1979) by Sebastian; Cirkus Fantastica (1979) by Sebastian; Tilfældigt forbi (1979) by Lone Kellermann og Rockbandet; Live (1980) by Sebastian; Stjerne til støv (1981) by Sebastian; Anne Linnet Band (1981) by Anne Linnet Band; 80'ernes boheme (1983) by Sebastian; Topsy (1983) by Sebastian; Tusind og én nat (1984) by Sebastian; Øbberbøv sangen (1984) by Sebastian; Den danske sang (Opsamling 81-85) (1985) by Sebastian; Afrika (Vi er børn af samme jord) (1985) by Sebastian; Red Barnet (1985) by various artists; Skatteøen (1986) by Sebastian; På vulkaner (1987) by Sebastian; Hjerternes sang (1989) by Lis Sørensen; Et eventyr (1989) by Sebastian; Miraklernes tid (1990) by Sebastian; Pippi (1998) by Sebastian; Grænseløs Greatest (1999) by various artists; Con amor by Lis Sørensen
- Sanne Salomonsen: Over havet under himlen (1973) by Sebastian; Menneske min ven (1973) by Ina; Sanne Salomonsen (1973) by Sanne Salomonsen; Blød lykke (1974) by Sebastian; Gøgleren, Anton og de andre (1975) by Sebastian; Ulvehøjen (1977) by Sebastian; Ikke alene Danmark (1978) by Sebastian; Anne Linnet Band (1981) by Anne Linnet Band; Pippi (1998) by Sebastian
- Peter Thorup: Blød lykke (1974) by Sebastian; Musik blev mit liv (1974) by Eddie Skoller; Gøgleren, Anton og de andre (1975) by Sebastian; Christiania (1976) by various artists; Måske ku' vi (1976) by Sebastian; Pas Paa (1980) by Steffen Dam; Skatteøen (1986) by Sebastian
- Ina Løndahl: Over havet under himlen (1973) by Sebastian; Menneske min ven (1973) by Ina; Fra en anden mands verden (1974) by Jan Toftlund
- Sissel Kyrkjebø: På vulkaner (1987) by Sebastian; Soria Moria (1989) by Sissel Kyrkjebø; Et eventyr (1989) by Sebastian
- Michael Falch: Afrika (Vi er børn af samme jord) (1985) by Sebastian; Skatteøen (1986) by Sebastian; Det gode menneske fra Sezuan (1988) by Sebastian
- Søs Fenger: Skatteøen (1986) by Sebastian; Miraklernes tid (1990) by Sebastian; Ronja Røverdatter (1991) by Sebastian
- Anne Linnet: Tiderne skifter (1979) by Sebastian; Anne Linnet Band (1981) by Anne Linnet Band
- Lars H.U.G: Skatteøen (1986) by Sebastian; Kopy (1989) by Lars H.U.G.
- Marianne Mortensen: Det gode menneske fra Sezuan (1988) by Sebastian; Cyrano (1993) by Sebastian
- Susanne Elmark: Pippi (1998) by Sebastian; Klinkevals (1999) by Sebastian
- Flemming Bamse Jørgensen: Skatteøen (1986) by Sebastian; Pippi (1998) by Sebastian
- Steffen Brandt: Skatteøen (1986) by Sebastian; Pippi (1998) by Sebastian
- Lone Kellermann: Tilfældigt forbi (1979) by Lone Kellermann og Rockbandet
- Rebecca Brüel: Pippi (1998) by Sebastian
- Blå Øjne: Romeo & Julie (1999) by Blå Øjne
- Majbritte Ulrikkeholm: Pippi (1998) by Sebastian
- Michael Bundesen: Ronja Røverdatter (1991) by Sebastian
- Eddie Skoller: Ronja Røverdatter (1991) by Sebastian

== Cinema ==
Works by Sebastian appear in these films:

- 1973 Rapportpigen
- 1976 Måske ku' vi
- 1978 Du er ikke alene
- 1980 Krigernes børn
- 1983 De uanstændige
- 1984 Hodja fra Pjort
- 1999 Klinkevals
- 2000 Juliane Jensen

== Television ==
Works by Sebastian appear in these television series:

- 1984 Øbberbøv (Title Song)
- 1987 Nana (Title Song)
- 1992 Gøngehøvdingen (Film music)
- 1998 Vip & Victor (Introduction)
- 2001 Klinkevalsen (Film music)
