= Ray Dee Ohh =

Danish pop band

- Origin: Copenhagen, Denmark
- Genres: Pop, Rhythm and blues
- Years active: 1988–1992
- Label: Replay
- Past members: Maria Bramsen; Caroline Henderson; Michael Bruun; Poul Halberg; Jan Sivertsen; Simon West; Christian Dietl

Ray Dee Ohh was a Danish pop band that existed between 1988 and 1992, made from the remnants from Tøsedrengene and The Lejrbåls. The group consisted of Maria Bramsen (vocals), Caroline Henderson (vocals), Michael Bruun (guitar), Poul Halberg (guitar), Jan Sivertsen (drums), Simon West (keyboard) and Christian Dietl (bass).

The band is known for a string of Danish-language pop-rock hits in their radio-friendly, polished style. The group was highly successful in Denmark, their three studio albums selling more than 500,000 copies combined.

== Discography ==
=== Studio albums ===
- Ray Dee Ohh (1989)
- Too (1990)
- Radiofoni (1991)

=== Compilations ===
- All The Hits (1996)
- De største og de bedste (2002)
