= Verdens Lykkeligste Mand =

Studio album by TV-2
- Released: 1994
- Recorded: 1993–94
- Genre: Pop rock
- Length: 52:15
- Language: Danish
- Label: Pladecompagniet
- Producers: Michael Bruun, Greg Walsh, Henrik Nilsson, Kasper Winding, tv·2

TV-2 chronology
Greatest – De unge år (1992)	Verdens Lykkeligste Mand (1994)	Kys bruden (1996)

Verdens Lykkeligste Mand is the tenth studio album by the Danish pop group TV·2. It was released in 1994 on Pladecompagniet.

== Track list ==
All lyrics and music were written by Steffen Brandt.

No.	Title	Producer(s)	Length
1.	"Ring til mig"	Michael Bruun	5:00
2.	"Det er samfundets skyld"	Michael Bruun	4:04
3.	"Kærligheden overvinder alt"	Michael Bruun	3:57
4.	"Sådan er det bare"	Michael Bruun	3:18
5.	"Verdens lykkeligste mand"	Greg Walsh	5:37
6.	"På fredag har jeg fri"	Michael Bruun, Henrik Nilsson	4:18
7.	"Mere sport om lidt"	Henrik Nilsson	3:05
8.	"Aldrig, gentar aldrig"	Michael Bruun, Henrik Nilsson	3:48
9.	"Hundene over Jakobshavn"	Greg Walsh	4:48
10.	"Stormfulde højder"	Kasper Winding	5:02
11.	"Mad og retfærdighed"		4:37
12.	"Det er nat derude"	Greg Walsh	4:41

== Personnel ==
=== Production ===
- Henrik Nilsson – producer and engineer
- Michael Bruun – producer
- Greg Walsh – producer
- Kasper Winding – producer
- tv·2 – producer
- Allan Ryg Krohn – ass. engineer
- Michael Munk – ass. engineer
- Anders Frandsen – studio check
- Michael Bruun – executive producer
- Bo Andersen – supervision
- Jan Degner – supervision
- Poul Martin Bonde – supervision

=== Musicians ===
- Hans Erik Lerchenfeld – guitar
- Georg Olesen – bass
- Sven Gaul – drummer
- Steffen Brandt – lyricist, composer, singer, keyboards and sitar
- Niels Hoppe – saxophone and arrangement
- Knud Erik Nørgaard – trumpet
- Christian Høgh – trombone
- Henrik Nilsson – hammond organ, wurlitzer and keyboards
- Lei Moe – chorus
- Jeanett Krüger – chorus
- Flemming Osterman – chorus
- Ivan Pedersen – chorus
