= The Lejrbåls =

Danish pop band

- Origin: Denmark
- Genres: Pop
- Years active: 1986–1987
- Labels: Replay
- Past members: Maria Bramsen; Michael Bruun; Poul Halberg; Jette Schandorf; Henrik Stanley Møller; Aage Hagen; Jan Sivertsen

The Lejrbåls were a Danish pop band that existed in 1986–87. Consisting of former members of Tøsedrengene and Halberg Larsen, the group comprised vocalist Maria Bramsen, guitarists Michael Bruun and Poul Halberg, Jette Schandorf on bass, Henrik Stanley Møller and Aage Hagen on keyboards and Jan Sivertsen on drums.

During their short career, the band released one album, the self-titled The Lejrbåls, in 1987. Despite initially getting favourable reviews for their live shows, the album was not well received and sold 10,000 copies, well below the numbers attained by the members' previous bands.

Many of the Lejrbåls members would later continue in the highly successful group Ray Dee Ohh, who also re-recorded the Lejrbåls song "Elskes af dig" for their debut album.

Their name is a nonsensical mix of English and Danish, "lejrbål" meaning "campfire" in Danish. The curious name emerged during a discussion to decide the name of the band; the name "The Reliables" was suggested and misheard as "The Lejrbåls" in the flurry of discussion.
