= Poul Krebs =

Danish singer and musician

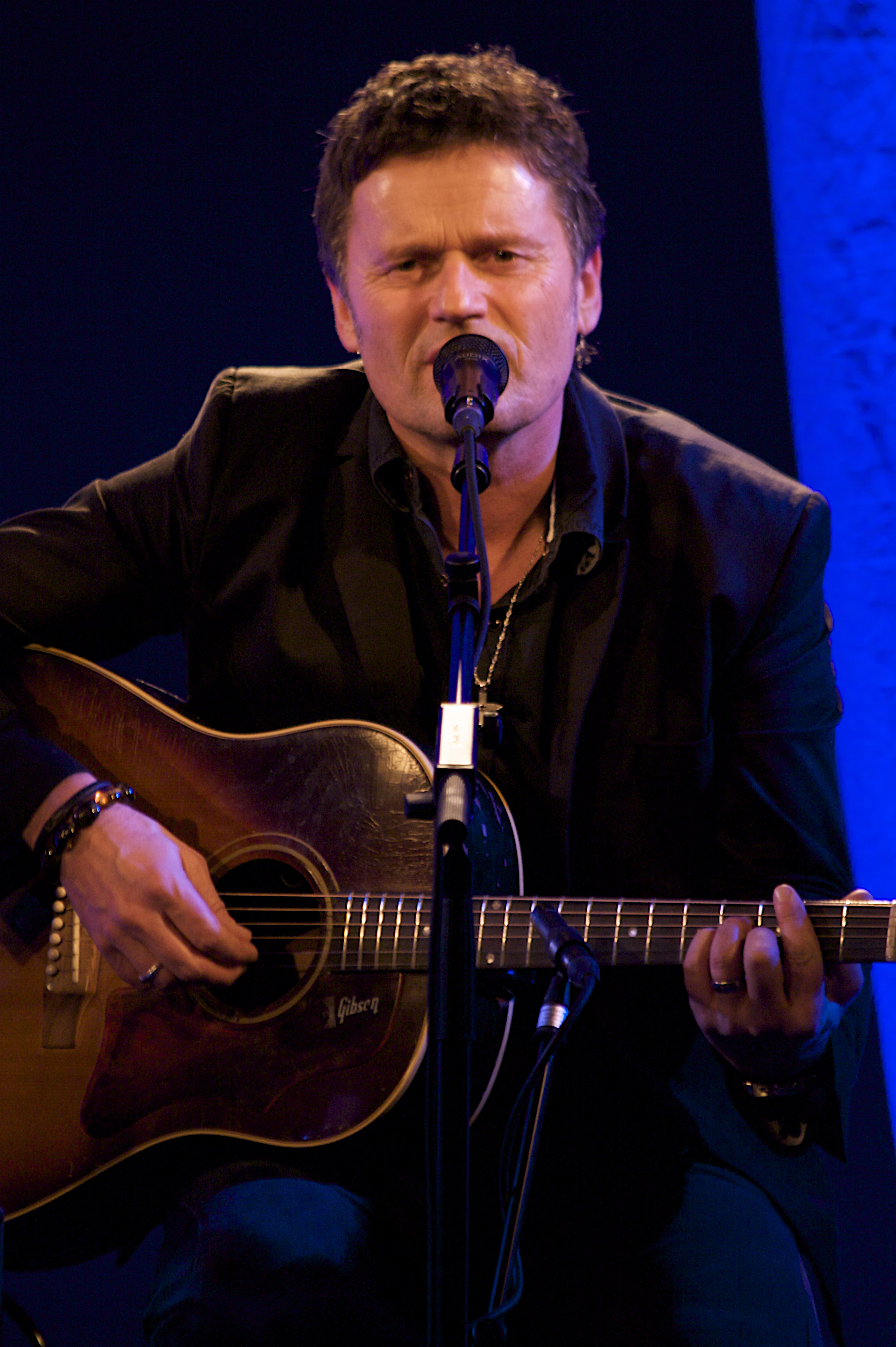
- Poul Krebs på Skråen i Aalborg i 2009

Background information
- Born: 28 May 1956 (age 69); Aarhus, Denmark
- Genres: Pop / rock
- Occupation: Singer
- Labels: Pladecompagniet, CMC, RecArt, KrebsFalch, ArtPeople
- Website: www.poulkrebs.org

Poul Krebs (born 28 May 1956) is a Danish pop/rock singer, songwriter and musician. He has released 23 albums and compilations, several topping the Danish Albums Chart.

Krebs grew up in Aarhus and was in his youth a talented handball player with IK Skovbakken main team. From his childhood, he was also involved in music forming his own band singing various covers. His main studio album, Fri som et forår (1990) was produced by the experienced English producer Greg Walsh. He moved with his girlfriend and future wife Ulla to Amsterdam where she was a choreographer. He composed the lyrics and music for the album Små Sentationer with one of his biggest hits "Sådan nogle som os" which was his real breakthrough in 1995.

Since the early 1990s, Poul Krebs has played on concert stages and released a great number of albums. He also collaborated with recording studios. He has tried his hand in several different contexts and among others one of The Three Tenors along with Steffen Brandt and Michael Falch as De Tre Tenorer (the Three Tenors). Falch and Krebs, best friends, toured together and released joint albums establishing also their own record label Krebs Falch.

Krebs is well known internationally through tours in Norway, Greenland, France and the United States and has collaborated with numerous musicians. He is also a regular charity concerts for, among others, Kosovo victims, Muscular Dystrophy Foundation, environmental/green causes and for the Danish Refugee Council. He is also a regular presence in biggest Danish music festivals, with songs in both English and Danish. In 2014, he was among the featured artists for season four of Toppen af Poppen on Danish TV 2 station.

== Discography ==
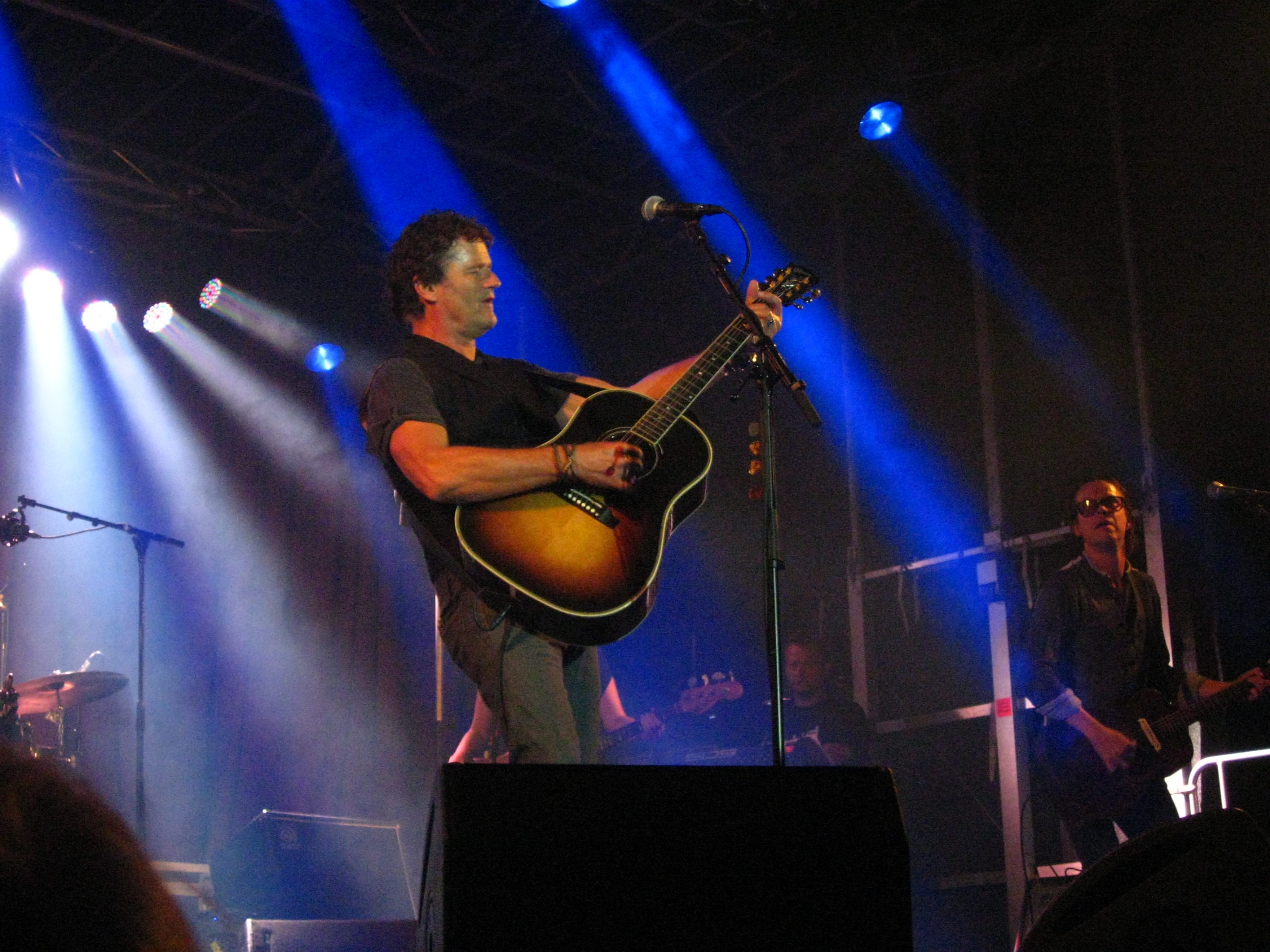
Poul Krebs performing in Hirtshals, 2013

=== Albums ===
Studio albums

- 1979: Efter stormen (Stuk)
- 1982: Krebs Band (Ferry) (credited as Krebs Band)
- 1984: Nat nu – under stjernerne (Front) (credited as Krebs Band)
- 1988: Hvor gaden bli'r til sand (Sundance)
- 1989: Langt fra en ordentlig by (Sonet)
- 1990: Fri som et forår (Sonet)
- 1991: Morgendagens tåber (Columbia) (credited to Poul Krebs & The Bookhouse Boys)
- 1992: Strejfer (Columbia) (credited as Poul Krebs & The Bookhouse Boys)
- 1993: Dansen, månen og vejen (CMC)
- 1995: Små sensationer (Pladecompagniet)
- 1997: Kosmorama (Pladecompagniet)
- 1999: Forbandede vidunderlige tøs (Pladecompagniet)

| Year | Album | Peak positions |
| Year | Album | DEN |
|---|---|---|
| 2002 | Striber af lys (Pladecompagniet) | 1 |
| 2003 | Usund skepsis (Pladecompagniet) | 3 |
| 2006 | Ku den næste dans blive min? (CMC) | 1 |
| 2009 | Angeleno Road – lige ved siden af virkeligheden (RecArt) | 2 |
| 2011 | Magnolia Tales (KrebsFalch) | 5 |
| 2011 | Der er noget ved alting (ArtPeople) | 15 |
| 2014 | Asfalt (ArtPeople) | 1 |
| 2015 | Tomandshånd with Michael Falch (ArtPeople) | 3 |
| 2017 | Maleren og delfinerne på bugten | 1 |
| 2020 | Ingen grænser for kærlighed | 6 |
| 2022 | Sange til natten | 4 |
| 2025 | Fuldtidsforhåbninger | 3 |

Live albums

| Year | Album | Peak positions |
| Year | Album | DEN |
|---|---|---|
| 2004 | På en god dag (CMC) | 3 |
| 2010 | Live Akustisk (KrebsFalch) (jointly with Michael Falch) | – |
| 2023 | Sidste sommer (Live fra Friheden) | 31 |

Compilation albums

| Year | Album | Peak positions |
| Year | Album | DEN |
|---|---|---|
| 2000 | Det minder lidt om eventyr – Poul Krebs’ bedste sange (Pladecompagniet) | 15 |
| 2005 | Jenniffer (Universal) | – |
| 2007 | Signatur (box set, Sony BMG) | 4 |
| 2009 | Poul Krebs 1991–2003 (Sony Music) | – |
| 2014 | Sådan nogen som os (& alle de andre) (Sony Music) | – |
