= Maria Bramsen =

- Born: 16 March 1963 (age 63)
- Genres: Pop rock, children's music
- Occupation: Singer

Maria Bramsen (born 16 March 1963) is a Danish singer, graphic designer and illustrator. She is probably most widely known for her career as a vocalist for pop bands Tøsedrengene and Ray Dee Ohh.

Bramsen joined Tøsedrengene in 1981, barely at the age of 18, replacing vocalist Gitte Naur. After Tøsedrengene's dissolution in 1986, she continued her career in the short-lived The Lejrbåls, before becoming vocalist in Ray Dee Ohh along with Caroline Henderson. Since then, she has recorded several children's songs.

In 2000, she finished her education from the Danish Design School, and has provided graphic design for Audi and Nike. In recent years, she has written and illustrated children's books.

She is married to keyboardist Simon West, whom she started dating while they were both members of Ray Dee Ohh, and is a mother of three.
