= Fantastiske Toyota =

Album by TV-2

Studio album by TV-2
- Released: 1981
- Recorded: Denmark
- Studio: Ram Studio
- Genre: New wave
- Length: 38:10
- Language: Danish
- Label: CBS
- Producer: tv-2

TV-2 chronology
Fantastiske Toyota	Verden er vidunderlig

Fantastiske Toyota is the first album from the Danish pop and rock band, TV-2. The album was released in 1981; the band was at the time a quintet as Niels Dan Andersen plays the sax and keyboard. When recording it, the drummer Sven Gaul was on holiday in the US, so Eigil Madsen plays the drums for most of the songs. The album proved a moderate success compared to the later albums of the band. Fantastiske Toyota reached sales of 28.000 records.

== Track listing ==
Words and music by Steffen Brandt, except "Kolde hjerner" which contains an excerpt of the poem "Jeg er havren" by Danish poet Jeppe Aakjær and "Uh, jeg ville ønske jeg var mig", lyrics by Brandt and Georg Olesen

Side one
No.	Title	Length
1.	"Motorvej"	2:20
2.	"Boligblok A"	3:32
3.	"I for identifikation"	1:45
4.	"Aldrig mere"	3:00
5.	"Er det her vores dans?"	2:12
6.	"Bordeaux – Bilbao"	2:12
7.	"Kolde hjerner"	3:27

Side two
No.	Title	Length
1.	"Ib René, Cairo"	1:45
2.	"Hele ugen alene"	1:33
3.	"Atmosfære"	2:44
4.	"Uh, jeg ville ønske jeg var mig"	2:00
5.	"Hvad skal jeg svare mit TV"	2:44
6.	"Fantastiske Toyota"	4:03
7.	"Dazu eisgekühltes Coca-Cola"	3:37
