= Dicte =

Dicte may refer to:

- Dicte or Diktynna, alternative names for Britomartis, the Minoan goddess of mountains and hunting
- Dicte (moth), fairy longhorn moth genus
- Dicte (musician), Danish musician and songwriter
- Dicte (TV series), a Danish TV series starring Iben Hjejle
- Dikti or Dicte, a mountain in Crete
