= TV-2 (band) =

Danish pop rock band group

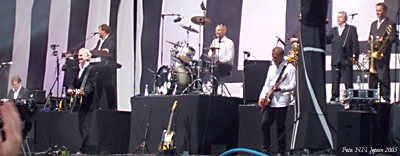
- TV-2 live in their hometown Aarhus in 2005

Background information
- Origin: Aarhus, Denmark
- Genre: Pop rock
- Years active: 1981–present
- Labels: EMI, CBS, Pladecompagniet, Medley Records, Have A Cigar, Universal Music Group
- Members: Steffen Brandt; Hans Erik Lerchenfeld; Georg Olesen; Sven Gaul
- Website: tv-2.dk

TV-2 (stylized as tv·2) is a Danish pop rock band group formed in 1981 in Aarhus. The group is composed of Steffen Brandt, Hans Erik Lerchenfeld, Georg Olesen, and Sven Gaul. Having released 20 studio albums, four live albums and three compilations, they are one of the most commercially successful Danish bands of all time - according to the band's own sales figures, they have sold more than two million records.

TV-2 was formed prior to the Danish television station TV 2, which began broadcasting in 1988. The band was originally called Taurus with lyrics sung in English. Taurus released a single album, Whatever Happened To The Sixties, in 1978. Taurus changed their name to TV-2 in 1981, and began singing in Danish at the same time. The band has dismissed rumors that TV-2 was an abbreviation of "Taurus Version 2". TV-2's success can be attributed to Steffen Brandt's songwriting, that often features ironic and satirical observations about the Danish middle class; making fun of its consumerism and conformity. Some of their songs, such as Fantastiske Toyota ("Fantastic Toyota"), are known to have commercial like concepts, with satirical undertones. Because of the mundane nature of the songwriting, TV-2 used to refer jokingly to themselves as "Denmark's most boring band".

In the beginning of their career, TV-2 played new wave pop music, heavily influenced by Kraftwerk, Talking Heads and the Danish band Kliché, where Steffen Brandt briefly played keyboards. In the band's early years, the critical reception was negative, as TV-2 were unfavourably compared to Kliché, but around the release of their third album Beat, music critics became more positive. The band has cited Beat as a defining album, where the band found their own unique sound.

Over the years, TV-2's music has gone through several phases, including a more acoustic folk pop sound. In 2005, TV-2 had a major comeback with the hit single De første kærester på månen, where the group returned to their roots and played 1980s-styled new wave music once again. The 1988 album Nærmest Lykkelig were added to the Danish Culture Canon in 2006.

== Band members ==
TV-2 is notable for virtually having the exact same line up since the band's formation in 1981. The only exception to the line up was their debut album from 1981, where drummer Sven Gaul was on vacation, and drummer Eigil Madsen would perform on nearly all songs. Through the years, TV-2 has collaborated with other musicians and orchestras, including The Danish Chamber Orchestra on the live album Manden der ønskede sig en havudsigt.

- Steffen Brandt – vocals, keyboards, guitar
- Hans Erik Lerchenfeld – guitar
- Georg Olesen – bass guitar
- Sven Gaul – drums

== Discography ==
=== Studio albums ===
| Year | Title | Translated title | Sales |
|---|---|---|---|
| 1981 | Fantastiske Toyota | Fantastic Toyota | 28,000 |
| 1982 | Verden er vidunderlig | The World Is Wonderful | 26,000 |
| 1983 | Beat | - | 54,000 |
| 1984 | Nutidens unge | Contemporary Youth | 103,000 |
| 1985 | Rigtige mænd (Gider ikke høre mere vrøvl) | Real Men (Don't Want to Hear More Fuss) | 250,000 |
| 1987 | En dejlig torsdag | Sweet Thursday | 120,000 |
| 1988 | Nærmest lykkelig | Almost Happy | 180,000 |
| 1990 | Vi bli'r alligevel aldrig voksne | We'll Never Grow Up Anyways | 128,000 |
| 1991 | Slaraffenland | Land of Milk and Honey | 57,000 |
| 1994 | Verdens lykkeligste mand | The World's Happiest Man | 100,000 |
| 1995 | Kys bruden | Kiss the Bride | 138,000 |
| 1998 | Yndlingsbabe | Favourite Babe | 75,000 |
| 2001 | Amerika | America | 56,000 |
| 2002 | På kanten af småt brændbart | On the Edge of Tiny Flammable | 48,000 |
| 2005 | De første kærester på månen | The First Lovers on the Moon | 161,000 |
| 2007 | For dig ku' jeg gøre alting | For You I Would Do Anything | 80,000 |
| 2011 | Showtime | - | 35,000 |
| 2015 | Det gode liv | The Good Life | unknown |
| 2018 | Tæt trafik i Herning | Dense Traffic in Herning | unknown |
| 2025 | Som om vi ikke har mere at sige | As If We Don't Have More To Say | unknown |

=== Live albums ===
| Year | Title | Translated title | Sales |
|---|---|---|---|
| 1987 | Fri som fuglen | Free as a Bird | 69,000 |
| 1999 | Verdens lykkeligste band - Live 99 | The World's Happiest Band – Live 99 | 70,000 |
| 1999 | Manden der ønskede sig en havudsigt | The Man Who Wanted A Sea View | 14,000 |
| 2014 | Greatest Green - sæler, hvaler og solskin | Greatest Greenland – Seals, Whales and Sunshine | unknown |
| 2022 | The Holbæk Recordings 81 | - | unknown |

=== Compilation albums ===
| Year | Title | Translated title | Sales |
|---|---|---|---|
| 1992 | Greatest - De unge år | Greatest – The Early Years | 173,000 |
| 2004 | Hits | - | 106,000 |
| 2012 | Bag duggede ruder (box set) | Behind Steamy Windows | unknown |
