= Malurt =

Danish rock band

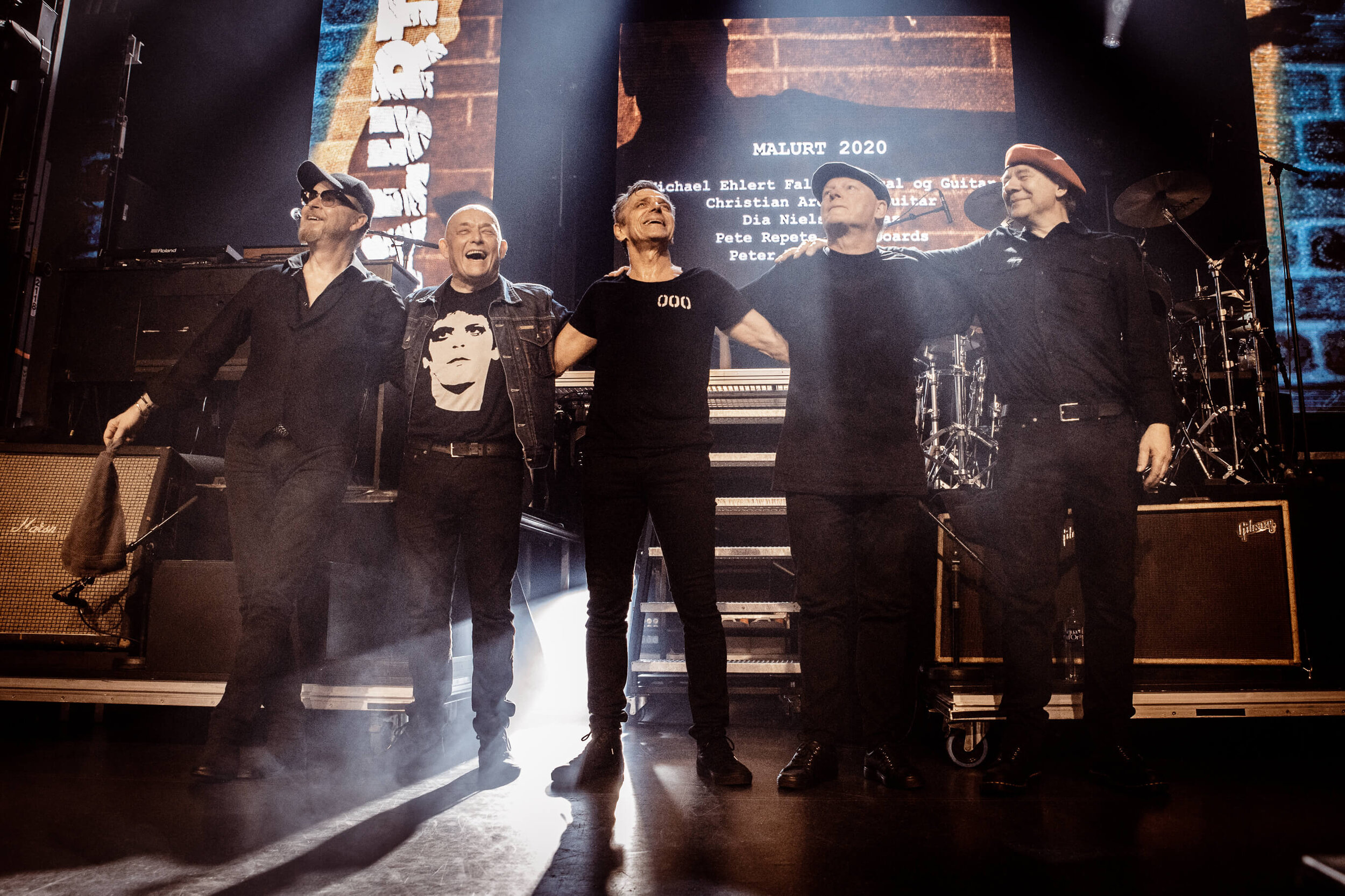
Malurt live in Vega Copenhagen February 2020. Photo Thomas Rungstrøm

Malurt was a long-running Danish rock band established in 1977 by Michael Falch who was the band's lead singer. Malurt released their debut album Kold Krig in 1980 on small label Amar Records, but breakthrough came with the album Vindueskigger and the emanating hit single from the album called "Superlove". The band was signed to Medley Records.

Following disagreements with leader and main songwriter Michael Falch in 1982 Peter Viskinde and Henrik Littauer left the band and turned their side-project into the full-time band Doraz.

Malurt was restored in 1990, with a debut concert during Roskilde Festival. It went on to release four more albums before being put on hold in 1994, without officially dissolving. They reunited for brief 25th anniversary tour in September 2005.

== Members ==
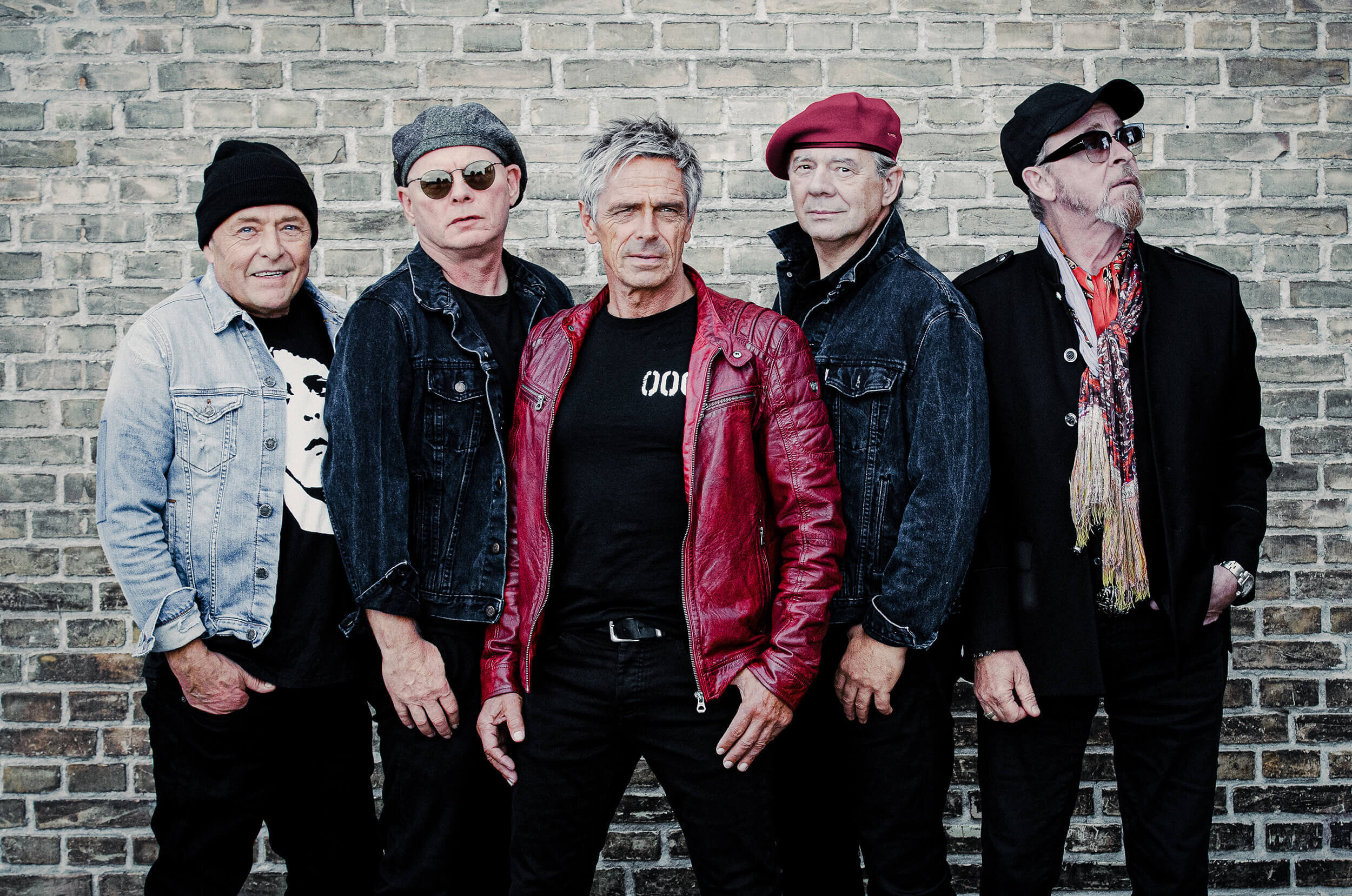
Malurt official PR photo 2020. Photo Thomas Rungstrøm

Malurt was made up of five members:

- Michael Falch - vocals and guitar
- Peter Viskinde - guitar
- Henrik Littauer - keyboards
- Peter Mors - drums
- Dia Nielsen - bass

In 1982, changes were made as follows:

- Christian Arendt - guitar (replacing Peter Viskinde)
- Pete Repete - keyboards (replacing Henrik Littauer)

== Discography ==
=== Albums ===
First period (1976-1984)

- 1980: Kold krig
- 1981: Vindueskigger
- 1982: Black-Out
- 1983: Tour de Force
- 1984: Live – kys mig før jeg blir cool

Second period (1990-1994)

- 1990: Spøgelser
- 1992: Uden filter
- 1993: Ghetto
- 1994: Live – Længe – Leve

Reunion albums (2005)

- 2005: Super Love Greatest (reached DEN: #6)
- 2008: Det Bedste (compilation, best of Malurt)
- 2022: Sidste Skrig Live I K.B. Hallen

=== Singles ===
First period (1976-1984)

- 1981: "CPR/Neonsolen"
- 1981: "Superlove/Vindueskigger"
- 1982: "Mød mig i mørket"
- 1983: "Tar til Tokyo"
- 1983: "Black-Out" (1990-1994)

Second period (1990-1994)

- 1992: "Gammel Kærlighed"
- 1992: "Den eneste i Verden"
- 1992: "Spøgelser"
