= Kliché =

Danish rock band

- Origin: Aarhus, Denmark
- Genres: Rock, New Wave
- Years active: 1977–1985
- Past members: Anders Brill; Lars H.U.G. Nils Torp; Jens Valo; Johnny Voss

Kliché was a Danish rock band from Aarhus, known for their avant-garde and postmodern musical style. In performance, the group wore uniforms or overalls in order to reflect a factory, even going so far as to use a metal grinder as an instrument. They frequently infused their music with political commentary, ironically quoting figures like Mao Zedong and Buddha. Their first album Supertanker was entered into the Danish Culture Canon in 2006 because of its influential expression of emerging post-modernity in early 1980's Denmark.

The band was formed in 1977 by Anders Brill, Lars H.U.G., Jens Valo, and Johannes Voss (Johannes Møller). The group's original members met while studying at the Aarhus Art Academy. Nils Torp, Steffen Brandt, and Hilmer Hassig later played with the group as well. The group effectively dissolved after Lars H.U.G. left in 1985, though other members continued to collaborate under the name Voss/Torp/Brill and later Voss/Torp.

== History and musical style ==
The original members of the band met while studying at the Aarhus Art Academy, and formed together in 1977. Together, the group's postmodern and new wave style was influenced by rock artists of the era such as Kraftwerk, David Bowie, Roxy Music and Brian Eno. In performance, they wore white boilersuits, likely influenced or inspired by the group DEVO, which had been performing with a similar uniform.

Their debut album, Supertanker, was released in 1980 by Medley Records. As a work of social commentary, the supertanker was used by the band as a symbol of mass consumption. The album provides commentary on consumerism and is critical of prevailing political ideologies. In particular, their song "Masselinjen" is a direct and obvious commentary on Mao Zedong's mass line. It is a ten minute long piece with only one lyric: a direct quote from Mao stating “the people, and the people alone, are the motive force in the making of world history” (Danish: “Folket og kun folket er drivkraften i skabelsen af verdenshistorien”). While Danish rock of the era was often politically charged, Supertanker was a revolutionary work of social commentary because it employed ambiguous lyrics and ambient sounds to communicate its message. The album's musical style was pioneering in its use of exposed synthesizer sounds, distorted guitar, instrumental pop, and an overall focus on atmospheric tonal quality rather than pure melody. The album was formally entered in the Danish Culture Cannon in 2006 for its unique impact on the Danish post-modern movement during the 1980s.

Kliché's second album, Okay Okay Boys, was released in 1982 under the same label. The album was a stylistic continuation of their first, with similarly socially critical lyrics. Production began soon thereafter on a third album, but this was never completed. The band in effect dissolved in 1985 when Lars Hug left the group to pursue a solo career. The remaining members of the band continued to collaborate under different names during the late 1980s. A compilation album, De Samlede Klichéer, was released in 2010.

== Band members ==
The band was originally formed by Lars H.U.G. (singer and guitarist), Jens Valo (Keyboardist), Anders Brill Gilberg (Drummer), and Johannes Møller (Bassist) who performed under the name Johnny Voss. Jens Valo left the group shortly after the release of their first album in 1980. He was temporarily replaced by Steffen Brandt, before Nils Torp took his place in 1981. Hilmer Hassig, who later formed the band Love Shop, briefly collaborated with the band as a guitarist to produce their second album, Okay Okay Boys in 1982.

After Hug left the band 1985, the remaining three members—Johannes Voss, Nils Torp, and Anders Brill—continued to collaborate under the name Voss/Torp/Brill. They released a single album titled Dobbelt Plus in 1984. The trio broke up again not long thereafter. Voss and Torp again reformed as the duo Voss/Torp and released their album Den Store Lysfest in 1987.

The group's former members went on to various careers:

- Anders Brill — worked as journalist after leaving the music industry. He died of cancer in 2009 at the age of 62.
- Lars H.U.G — debuted a solo music career and began working as a painter.
- Nils Torp — formed the duo Souvenirs with Sofie Bonde.
- Jens Valo — joined the band Grind in the 1990s, performing under the name Jens Danielsen.
- Johannes Voss — resumed working as a painter.

== Discography ==
=== Albums ===
Studio albums

- 1980: Supertanker
- 1982: Okay Okay Boys

Compilation albums

- 2010: De Samlede Klichéer (compilation), Reached #26 on Danish Albums Chart

=== Singles ===
- 1979: "Militskvinder" / "Farvel"
- 1980: "Aldrig mere" / "Militskvinder"
- 1982: "Bravo Charlie" / "Patrulje"
- 1982: "Patrulje" / "Okay Okay Boys"
- 1982: "Bravo Charlie" / "Oppenheimers formiddag"
- 1985: "Shooting Star"
