= Verden Er Vidunderlig =

Verden er vidunderlig (English: The World is Wonderful) is the second album from the Danish pop and rock band TV-2. It was released in 1982 and is stylistically in line with the group's 1981 debut, Fantastiske Toyota. The album features New Wave inspired music with lyrics on technology and alienation. The sales were equal to those of the debut, reaching approximately 26,000 units sold.
