= Barbara Moleko =

Danish singer

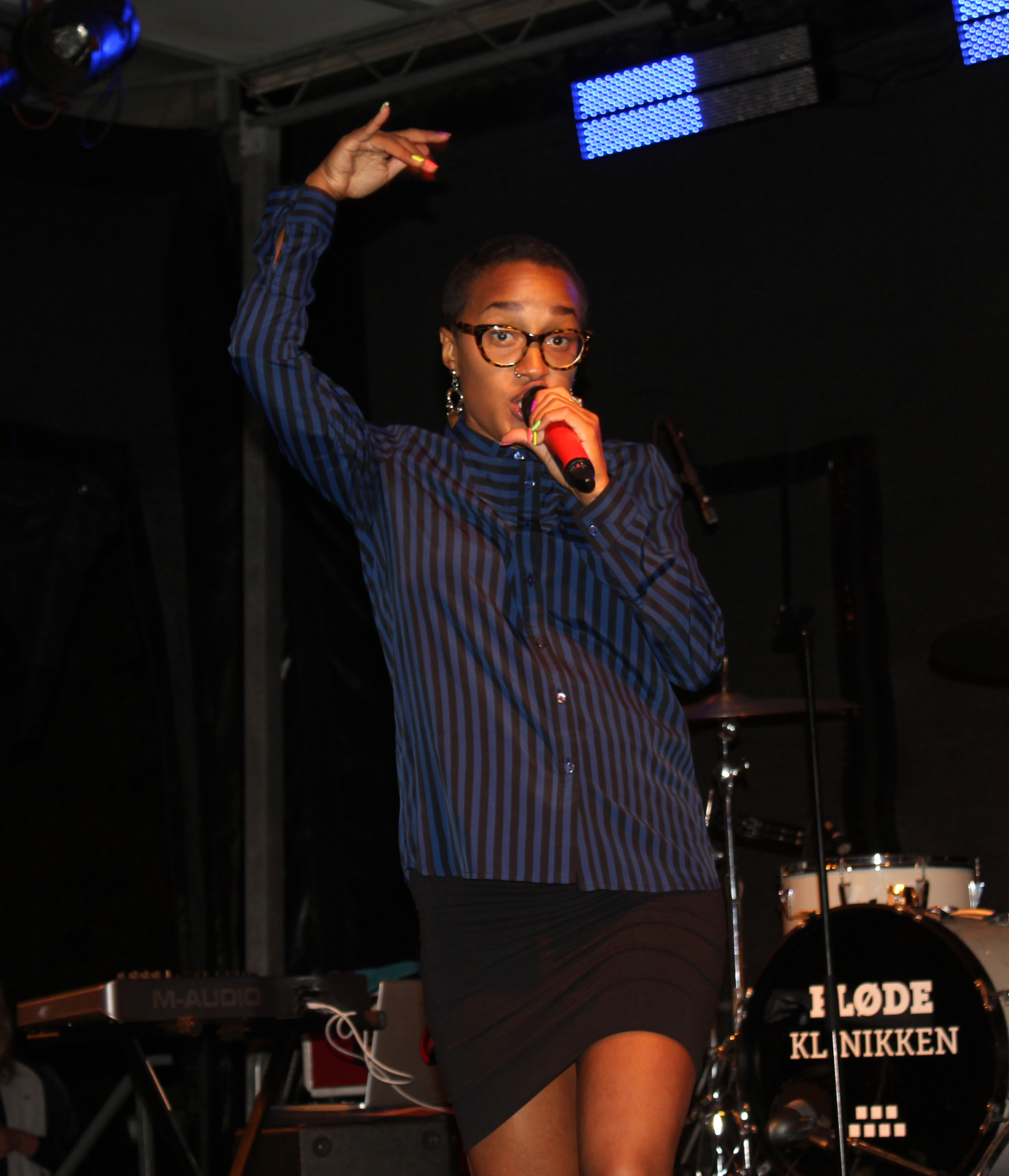

Background information
- Birth name: Barbara Boitumelo Aersoe
- Born: 1986; Copenhagen, Denmark
- Origin: Danish singer of Danish / South African origin
- Genres: pop, soul, R&B
- Occupation(s): Singer, songwriter
- Years active: 2010 – present
- Website: www.barbaramoleko.dk

Barbara Boitumelo Aersoe better known as Barbara Moleko (born in 1986) is a Danish singer and songwriter.

Moleko was born in Rigshospitalet, Copenhagen to a South African father and a Danish mother. She spent her younger years in Mozambique. But when her parents divorced, she moved at the age of 12 with her mother to Denmark in 1998, to reside in Vanløse, a district of Copenhagen. Trying to pursue a musical career, she gained popularity by appearing in 2010 in KarriereKanonen, a musical talent show on Danish DR P3 radio station. On 19 March 2012, she released her debut single "Gå en tur" followed on 20 June 2012 by the EP Enchantments in collaboration with the band XOB. Soon after, she was backing vocals of rapper LOC big No. 1 hit "Helt min egen". She was also featured in the Danish Christmas hit "Jeg brækker mig" Sara og David and included in addition to Moleko, TopGun and Ivan Pedersen. On 17 September 2012 she released her critically acclaimed debut studio album Lykken er... (Happiness is...).

== Discography ==
=== Albums ===
| Year | Album | Peak positions | Certification |
| Year | Album | DEN | Certification |
|---|---|---|---|
| 2012 | Lykken er... | 4 | |
| 2015 | Bapsz | 6 | |

== EPs ==
- 2012: Enchantments (EP)

=== Singles ===
| Year | Album | Chart peak DEN | Certification | Album |
|---|---|---|---|---|
| 2012 | "Dum for dig" | 7 | | Lykken er... |
| 2013 | "Gør det lettere" | 33 | | |
| 2014 | "Indianer" | 1 | | |
| 2014 | "Sådan nogen som os" | 4 | | |

Featured in

| Year | Album | Chart peak DEN | Certification | Album |
|---|---|---|---|---|
| 2012 | "Jeg brækker mig" (Sara & David på P3 feat. TopGunn, Barbara Moleko & Ivan Pedersen) | 23 | | Non-album release |
| 2013 | "Kvinder og kanoner" (Djämes Braun feat. Barbara Moleko) | 28 | | TBA |
| 2016 | "Don't U Worry" (Faustix feat. Barbara Moleko) | 40 | | TBA |
