= Djämes Braun =

Danish reggae and dancehall act

- Origin: Denmark
- Genres: Reggae, dancehall
- Years active: 2012–present
- Members: Pilfinger (Lasse Kramhøft)
- Past members: Kenno (Kent Pedersen)

Djämes Braun is a Danish reggae and dancehall act made up of Pilfinger (full name Lasse "Pilfinger" Kramhøft) and former member Kenno (full name Kent "Kenno" Pedersen).

They became known in 2012 mostly through their appearance on the musical talent show KarriereKanonen broadcast on Danish radio station DR P3. Their debut single was Duft af ba-cone followed by Kom og giv mig alle dine penge.

The name Djämes Braun is an alternative way of writing James Brown.

In late 2017 Kenno left the act. Djämes Braun is still active as a solo project by Pilfinger.

== Discography ==
=== Albums ===
Year	Album	Peak positions	Certification
Year	Album	DEN	Certification
2015	Modgift	5	

=== Singles ===
Year	Single	Peak positions	Certification	Album
Year	Single	DEN	Certification	Album
2012	"Duft af ba-cone"	27		Modgift
2012	"Kom og giv mig alle dine penge"	18		Modgift
2013	"Kvinder og kanoner" (featuring Barbara Moleko)	28		Modgift
2014	"Fugle"	2		Modgift
2015	"Inficeret"	24		Modgift
2016	"Geronimo"	TBD		TBD

Featured in

Year	Single	Peak positions	Certification	Album
Year	Single	DEN	Certification	Album
2012	"Nede med koldskål" (Klumben featuring Niklas, Shaka Loveless, Mette Lax, Djämes Braun & Steggerbomben)	–		Non-alum singles
2013	"Ejer det" (Kato featuring Specktors & Djämes Braun)	4		Non-alum singles
