= Wafande =

French Danish African singer

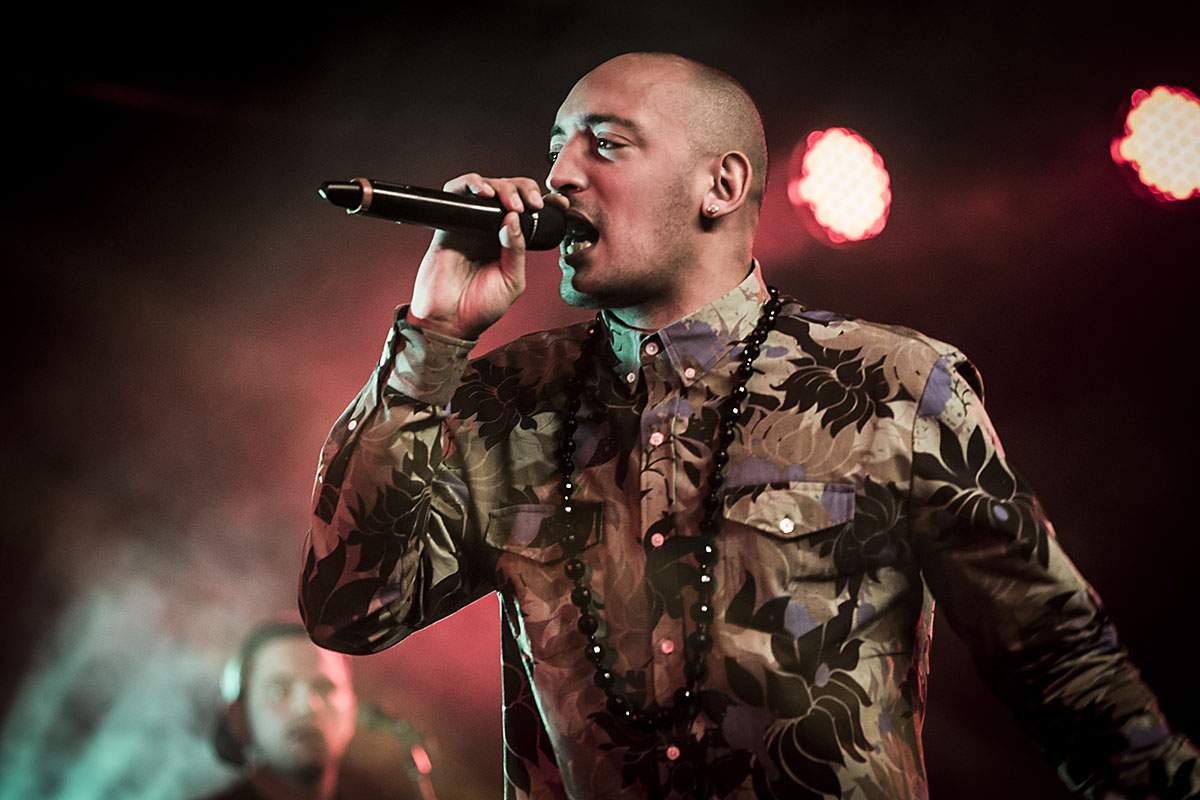
- Wafande in Øksnehallen, 2014

Background information
- Born: Wafande Pierre Jolivel Zahor; 21 January 1983 (age 43); Freetown Christiania, Copenhagen, Denmark
- Genres: Reggae, Soul
- Occupation: Singer
- Instrument: Vocals
- Years active: 2010–2025
- Labels: Universal Music

Wafande Pierre Jolivel Zahor (born 21 January 1983), better known by his mononym Wafande, is a Danish singer and songwriter of African-French descent, in the field of reggae, soul and urban-hit tunes and is a true influencer in the nature of the word. These factors are reflected in his music and personality and have made him famous in Denmark. He is signed to Universal Music.

== Life ==
He grew up in Freetown Christiania, a neighborhood in Copenhagen, Denmark. Wafande moved with his family to France when he was 8 years old. For some years, Wafande's studies and his basketball skills took the upper hand, but at the point when real choices had to be made, Wafande chose his music career over the one as an elite basketball player. "I couldn't do basketball practice five times a week while out playing gigs in the weekends", Wafande explains. The music choice paid off; Wafande's track record of so far is three platinum and two gold singles and two top ten solo albums of which one gold. Wafande's first hit came in 2011 with the platinum summer No. 1 single ’Gi’ Mig Et Smil’, produced by Pharfar and Fresh-I. More hit certifications followed; ‘En Anden’ (platinum) ’Uartig’ (2× platinum) debut album ‘Du Ved Det’ (gold), ‘Django (Klar På Noget Dumt)’ (gold) and ‘Se Mig I Dag’ (gold).

In 2015 Wafande released the EP "Grand Danois" and the hit single "Himlen For Mig Selv" going straight to 'Ugens Uundgåelige' on Danish Radio P3 (powerplay) and topped the charts for weeks. Same year Wafande started a new project Black Dylan with producer Nuplex reaching the international scene, going straight to BBC Radio 2 playlist. They have played several international live shows, including a show at London's Ronnie Scott's, London Jazz Festival and Eurosonic to name a few. Wafande has been a coach on TV2 Voice Junior for six seasons in a row, further establishing him as one of Denmark's biggest and most loved personalities. In 2019, he is releasing a new Danish project with his long time friend and popular singer, Shaka Loveless and also several international releases, most recently with the producer duo Hyperclap, which has been playlisted to the German national radio station N-Joy. On top of that, Wafande has been working hard in sessions in Europe, USA and Bahamas, resulting in a strong batch of new tracks, ready for the international scene. Wafande has done charity work with numerous foundations such as Red Cross, WWF, the homeless, children with cancer, and more.

== Discography ==
=== Albums ===
Year	Album	Peak Position	Certification
Year	Album	DAN	Certification
2011	Du ved det	4	Gold
2014	Nyt land	7	

=== EP'er ===
· Grand Danois (2015)

=== Singles ===
Year	Single	Peak Position	Certification	Album
Year	Single	DAN	Certification	Album
2011	"Gi mig et smil" (feat. Lil' Kaka)	–	Platinum	Du ved det
2011	"En anden" (feat. Xander)	19	Platinum	Du ved det
2012	"Uartig"	6	2*Platinum	Du ved det
2014	"Django (Klar på noget dumt)"	13	Gold	Nyt land
2014	"Se mig i dag"	40	Gold	Nyt land
2015	"Himlen For Mig Selv"			Grand Danois
