= Dicte (musician) =

Danish musician

- Born: Benedicte Westergaard Madsen; 9 September 1966 (age 59); Glostrup, Copenhagen, Denmark
- Occupations: Singer, songwriter
- Years active: 1989 - present
- Labels: Pladecompagniet; Start Records; ArtPeople; Stunt Records

Benedicte Westergaard Madsen better known as Dicte (born in Glostrup, Denmark on 9 September 1966) is a Danish musician and songwriter.

Madsen started playing at a young age singing her own compositions starting 1983. She was also a great fan of Janis Joplin and included Joplin songs in her repertoire. She joined the band Farandola based in Viborg, Denmark.

== In band Her Personal Pain ==
In 1987 she moved to Aarhus playing in various formations before forming her own band called Her Personal Pain in 1989. She also took part in many music talent competitions.

The group released many singles and took part in a tour across the country gaining many fans and critical acclaim from the music critics. They also took part in the Roskilde Festival in 1990. They were also active in Amnesty International campaigns. The debut album of the band Her Personal Pain appeared in 1992. In 1993, Madsen decided to go solo for a personal music career.

== Solo career ==
Dicte's first solo album was released in 1994 called Between Any Four Walls upon which she was granted a three-year grant from the Danish Arts Foundation. She has released since then several of her own albums in many genres including jazz, classical, R&B and rock music. She has also appeared in films and theatre as an actress.

== In Benedicte and the Sugarbones ==
Gradually, Benedicte Madsen assembled a new musical band with her longtime collaborator Kæv Gliemann on keyboards. The band is named Benedicte and the Sugar Bones, where she is a guitarist and vocalist.

== Awards ==
Dicte was nominated for Danish Music Awards as the 2007 Danish Female Singer of the Year.

== Personal life ==
Madsen was married to the drummer Laust Sonne from band D-A-D. the couple had two children before getting divorced.

== In popular culture ==
- In 2010, she took part in the Vild med dans, the Danish version of Dancing with the Stars on TV 2.
- In 2012, she took part in the third season of Toppen af Poppen the Danish version of The Best Singers series alongside Sanne Salomonsen, Mads Langer, the rapper Johnson, Peter Belli, Nabiha and Kasper Winding.
- She has also appeared in the film Pusher II, the Danish TV series Anna Pihl and in TV comedy series Kristian.

== Discography ==
=== Albums ===
- 1994: Between Any Four Walls
- 1996: Voodoo Vibe
- 2000: This Is Cool
- 2003: Gone to Texas
- 2010: Tick Tock
- 2021: All Good as It Is

as Dicte and the Sugarbones

- 2006: Dicte and the Sugarbones
