= Anne Dorte Michelsen =

Danish musician (born 1958)

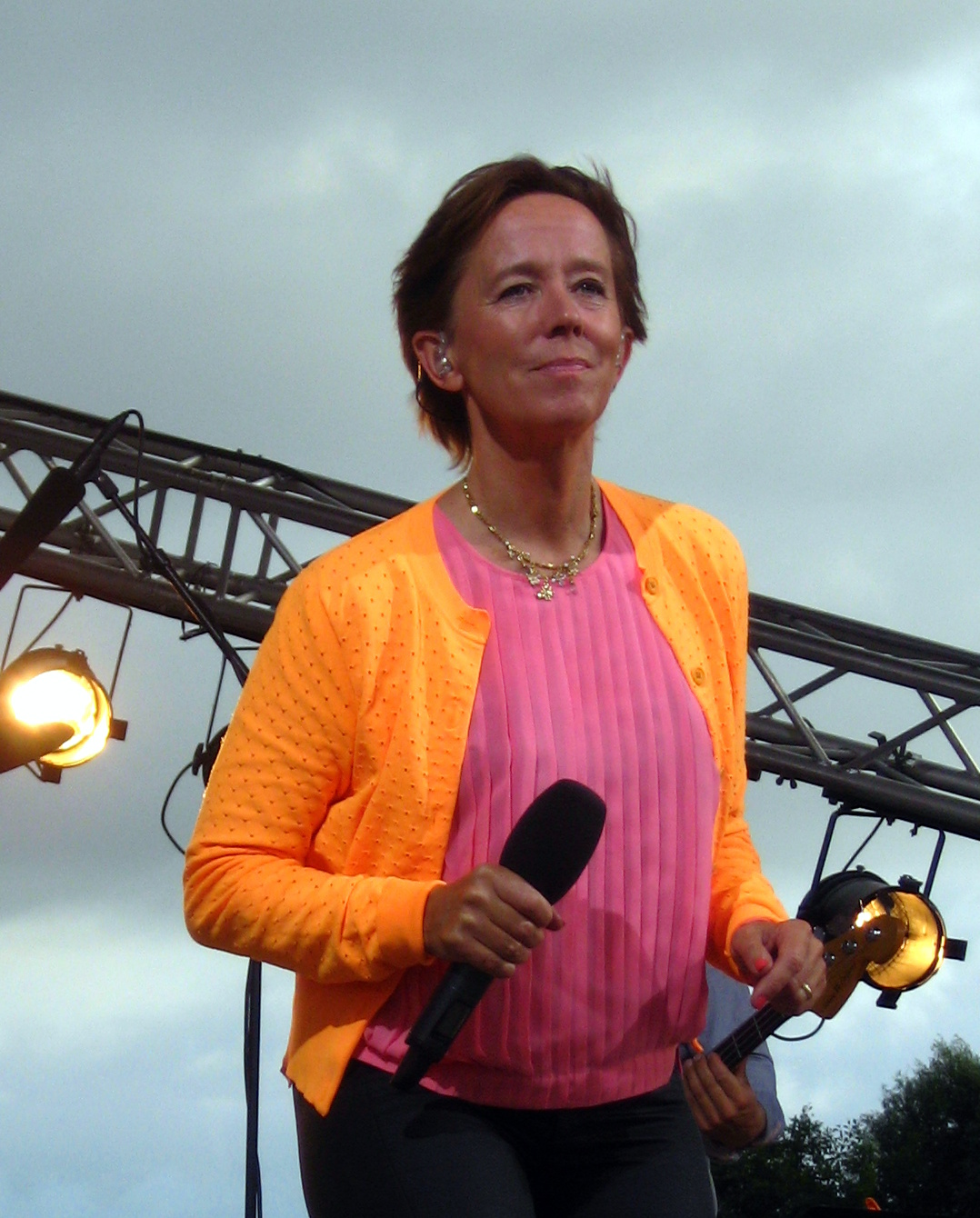
Anne Dorthe in Blokhus, August 2013

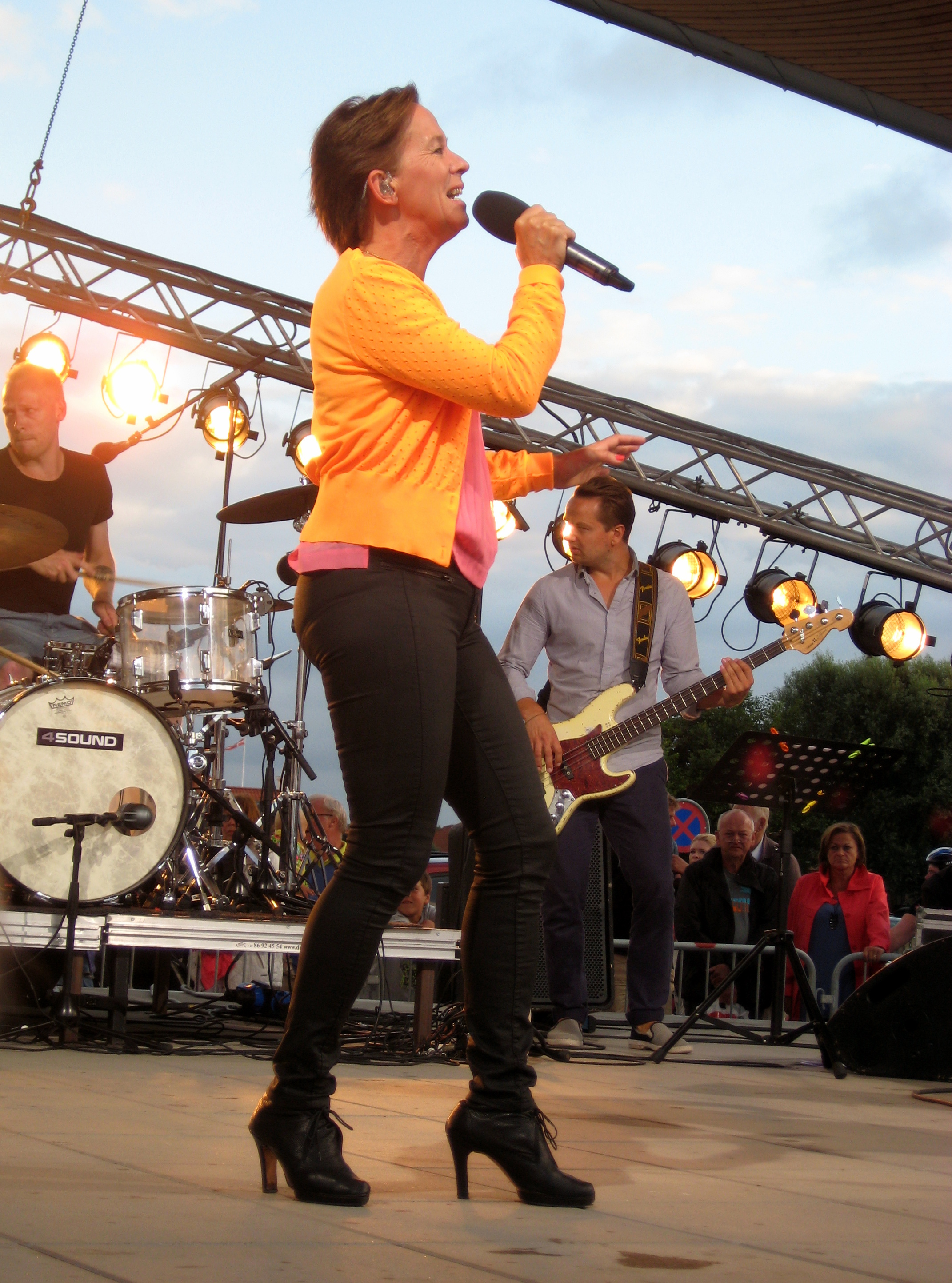
Anne Dorthe in Blokhus, August 2013

Anne Dorte Michelsen (born 17 July 1958 in Århus) is a Danish singer and composer. In Denmark, she first became known as a member of the groups Tøsedrengene and Venter på Far. Outside Denmark, her second solo record ("Næste Dans") sold well in Norway, Sweden and Japan. Her popularity in Japan was due to the song "Fortrolighed" which was a title song on a popular Japanese TV-show. The exotic Danish language and the longing melancholy mood apparently made a resonance with the Japanese audience. As a leader, she released ten albums and published a book called Næste Dans.

== Discography ==
- Mellem Dig og Mig (1983)
- Næste Dans (1986)
- Alting Vender Tilbage (1987)
- Elskerindens Have (1989)
- Den Ordløse Time (1990)
- Min Karriere Som Kvinde (1992)
- Mørke Vande – Lyse Strande (2000)
- Fred hviler over land og by (2002)
- Så Stille Som Sne (2003)
- Hvor var det nu vi var? (2007)
- Hvis du vidste (2011)
- De voksnes rækker (2015)
- Thumbs Up (2023)

=== Compilation albums ===
- 24 Hits (1988)
- De Store & De Stille (1998)
- Grænseløs Greatest (1999)
