= Caroline Henderson (singer) =

Danish–Swedish singer

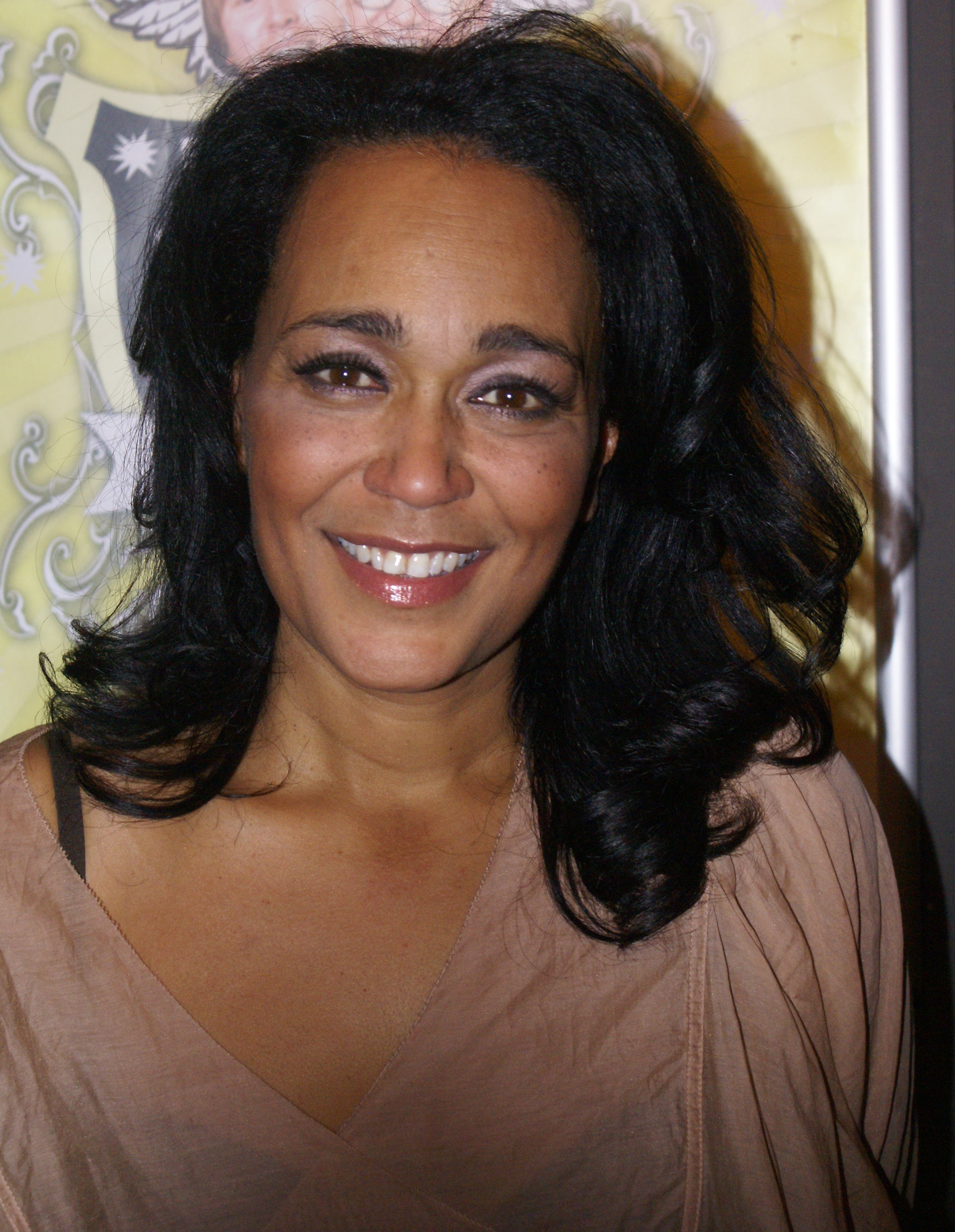

Background information
- Born: 28 February 1962 (age 64); Stockholm, Sweden
- Genres: Pop, jazz
- Occupations: Singer, actress
- Formerly of: Ray Dee Ohh

Caroline Henderson (born 28 February 1962) is a Danish–Swedish pop and jazz singer. She moved to Copenhagen from Sweden in 1983 and spent her youth singing in various jazz bands. Her breakthrough was in 1989 as part of pop group Ray Dee Ohh. After the group disbanded, Henderson launched a solo career with the album Cinemataztic (1995) featuring smash hits "Kiss Me Kiss Me" and "Made in Europe".

Follow-up Metamorphing (1998), disco cover album Dolores J - The Butterfly (2000) and the more experimental Naos (2002) didn't have the same commercial impact. A new turn saw Henderson develop into a full-fledged jazz singer on albums Don't Explain (2003), Made in Europe (2004), Love Or Nothin’ (2006) and No. 8 (2008).

Henderson has also appeared as an actress in plays and films.

== Personal life ==
Henderson was born in Sweden to an African-American father and a Swedish mother. She moved to Denmark in 1983, and has spent most of her life there with two children.

== Awards ==
- 2010: Order of the Dannebrog

== Discography ==
=== Albums ===
Year	Album	Record label	Peak positions
Year	Album	Record label	DEN
1995	Cinemataztic	RCA	
1998	Metamorphing	RCA	
2000	Dolores J – The Butterfly	RCA	
2002	NAOS	Sony	29
2003	Don't Explain	Stunt/Sundance	17
2004	Made in Europe	Stunt/Sundance	32
2006	Love or Nothin'	Stunt/Sundance	14
2008	No 8	Stunt/Sundance	5
2009	Keeper of the Flame	Copenhagen Records	15
2011	Jazz, Love & Henderson	Sony Classical	
2011	Jazz Collection (box set)		
2012	Lonely House	Universal Music	20

=== Singles ===
Year	Single	record label	Peak positions	Album
Year	Single	record label	DEN	Album
2012	"Se en stjerne"	Sony Music	30	

== Filmography ==
- 2006: Der var engang en dreng – som fik en lillesøster med vinger as Snow White
- 2007: Tuya siempre as Gloria Cole
- 2008: Max Pinlig as Ofelias tante
- 2012: Julestjerner (TV series, 24 episodes) as Kim
- 2022: Vikings: Valhalla as Jarl Haakon
