= Michael Falch =

Danish singer, guitarist, author, actor

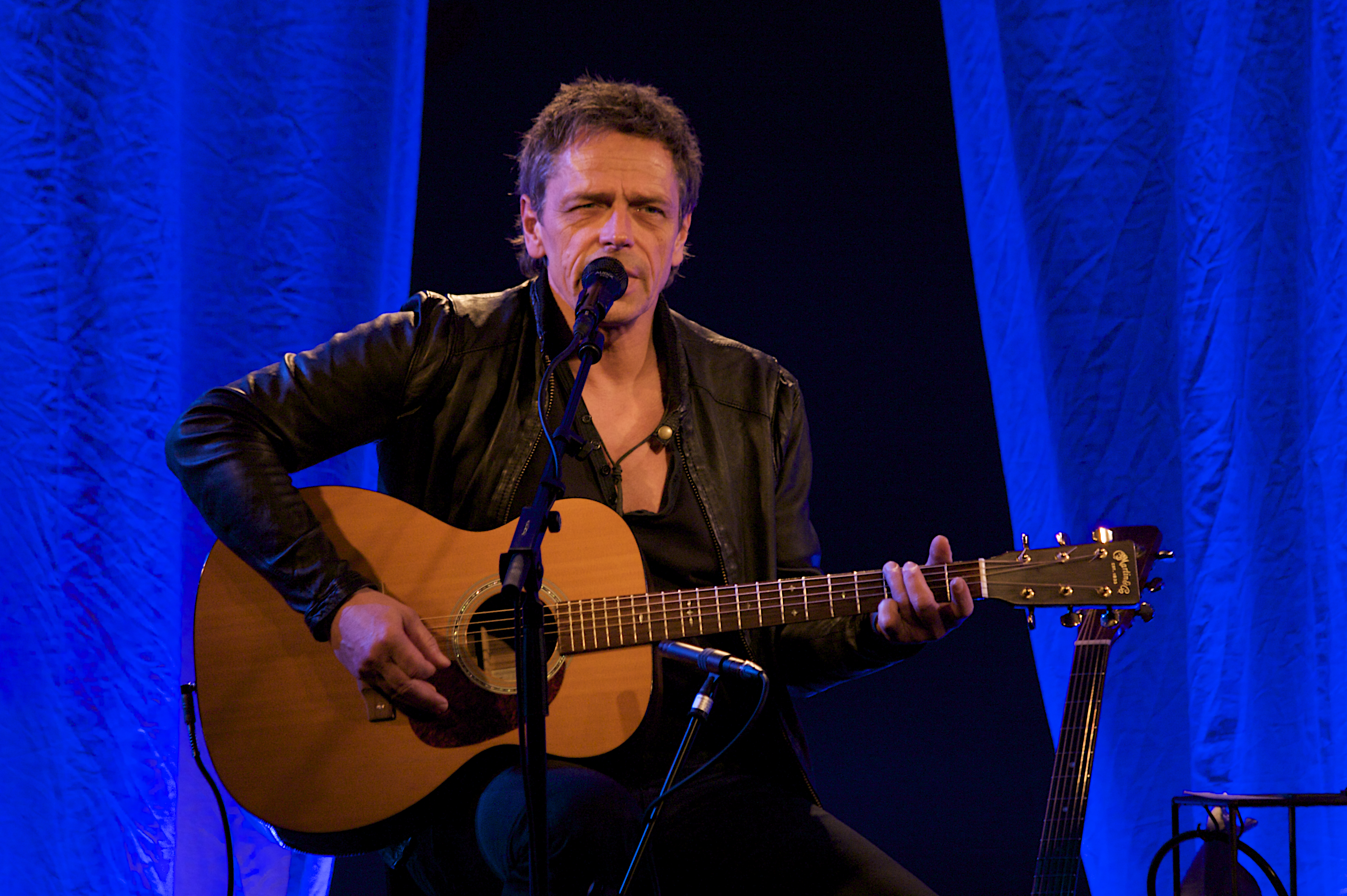

Background information
- Birth name: Michael Ehlert Falch
- Born: 16 September 1956 (age 68); Køge, Denmark
- Genres: Pop
- Years active: 1990 – present
- Website: www.falch.dk www.falchshop.dk

Michael Ehlert Falch (born 16 September 1956 in Køge, Denmark) is a Danish singer, guitarist, author and actor.

== In rock band Malurt ==
Michael Falch started his career as a lead singer and musician in the Danish rock band Malurt established in 1977 and made up of 5 members: Michael Falch (vocals and guitar), Christian Arendt (guitar), Henrik Littauer (keyboards), Peter Mors (drums) and Dia Nielsen (bass). In 1982, changes were made with guitarist Christian Arendt replacing Peter Viskinde and keyboardist Pete Repete replacing Henrik Littauer.

Malurt found success with a number of albums for the period 1976-1984. After a long hiatus stretching six years, Malurt was restored in 1990, with a debut concert during Roskilde Festival. It went on to release four more albums before being put on hold in 1994, without officially dissolving. They reunited for brief 25th anniversary tour in September 2005.

== Solo career ==
After the initial break-up of the band, Michael Falch went on solo releasing more than a dozen albums, including a compilation album and a live album. "Mød mig i mørket" and "I et land uden høje bjerge" are some of his best known songs.

Since 2002, he has been appearing at a number of solo concerts and in 2006 toured with the band Boat Man Love and in 2009-2010 with Poul Krebs.

Besides a busy musical career, he has appeared in roles in television series and in films winning the Bodil prize for one of his roles in the film Mord i mørket directed by Dan Turèll.

== Personal life ==
Michael Falch married Linda Lyneborg in 1983 and they three children, Anna, Soffi and Mathilde. He suffered from alcoholism and in 2002 went in for rehabilitation in Behandlingscenter Tjelehad establishment for treatment of alcohol abuse.

Michael Falch and his wife Linda Lyneborg divorced in 2006. Michael Falch resides in Vester Bøgebjerg near Boeslunde.

In 2007, journalist Torben Bille wrote a biography of Falch titled Ud af mørket published by Gyldendal.

== Discography ==
(For discography with Malurt, see the band's page on Wikipedia)

=== Albums ===
Earlier period

- 1985: Michael Falch
- 1986: Det andet land
- 1988: 26 hits (Michael Falch & Malurt)
- 1988: De vildeste fugle
- 1989: Håbets hotel
- 1990: Tossede verden
- 1995: De 17 bedste (compilation album)
- 1996: The Best of Michael Falch (1986–1988) (compilation album)
- 1996: Stævnemøder
- 1998: Nye rejsende
- 1999: Mød mig i mørket

Charting studio albums

Year	Album	Peak positions
Year	Album	DEN
2001	Lykkelig undervejs	19
2006	Falder du nu	2
2008	I kampens hede	13
2010	Fodspor i havet	2
2011	Tænd December (EP)	–
2013	Sommeren kom ny tilbage	1
2014	Hånden på hjertet – De største sange	2
2015	Tomandshånd (with Poul Krebs)	3
2016	Pludselig alting samtidig	2
2017	Hånden på hjertet – De største sange 2.0	5
2020	Forår I Brystet	1
2021	Elsker	3
2024	Drømmene	2

Live and compilation albums

Year	Album	Peak positions
Year	Album	DEN
2002	Hjemveje - Live	21
2010	Hele vejen / 1980-2010	4
2013	Michael Falch solo live vol. 1 - Venner & bekendte	–
2013	Michael Falch solo live vol. 2 - Nær & fjern	–

Albums with Boat Man Love

- 2007: Sang til undren (DEN #9)
- 2008: I kampens hede
- 2011: Fredagsrock 2011

Live album with Poul Krebs

- 2010: Live akustisk
