= Tøsedrengene =

Danish musical group

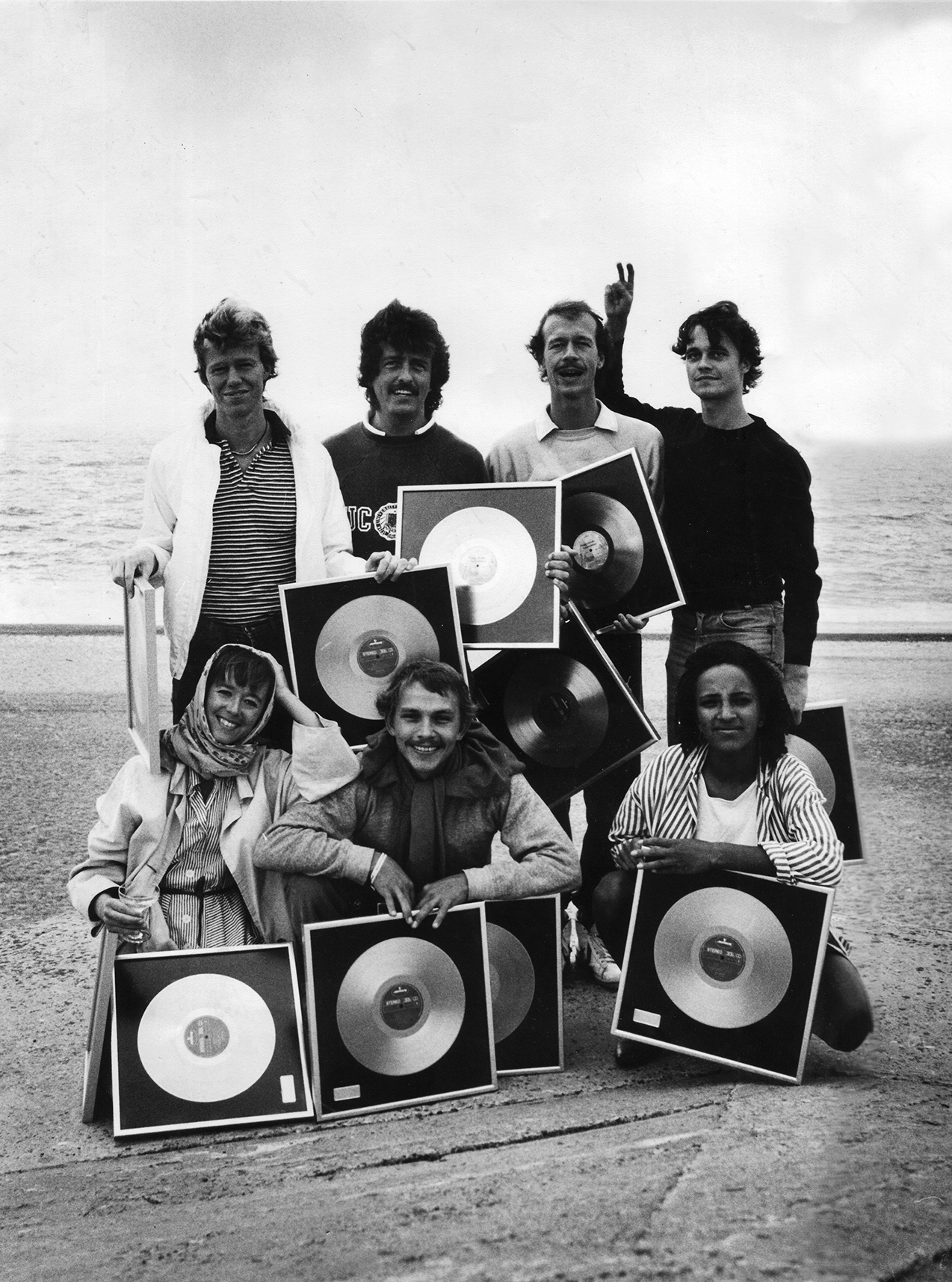
- Tøsedrengene - press photo 1982

Background information
- Origin: Denmark
- Genres: Pop rock, reggae
- Years active: 1978–1985
- Labels: Mercury
- Past members: Klaus Kjellerup; Henrik Stanley Møller; Michael Bruun; Aage Hagen; Jan Sivertsen; Anne Dorte Michelsen; Gitte Naur; Maria Bramsen; René Szczyrbak; Lars Danielsson
- Website: toesedrengene.com

Tøsedrengene were a Danish band that existed from 1978 to 1985, notable for their mix of pop-rock and reggae with Danish-language lyrics. During their active years, they achieved great success in Denmark, their six studio albums selling more than a million copies. The name translates to "The wimps", which is a parodic reference to the 70's anti masculine climate in Denmark.

The band was founded in 1978 by songwriter & bass player Klaus Kjellerup and his chidhood pal, keyboardman & vocalist Henrik Stanley Møller. Other members were Michael Bruun (guitar), Aage Hagen (keyboards) and drummer Jan Sivertsen. The basic idea of the founders was to establish the first band in Denmark who played reggae music with Danish lyrics - this eventually happened on the debut album 'Det går fremad' ('Moving forward') in 1979. Tøsedrengene's first hit in Denmark was the distinct and energetic reggae-pop song 'Sig du ka' li' mig' ('Tell me you like me') from the second album in 1981 which included a guest appearance by singer & lyricist Anne Dorte Michelsen who afterwards became member of the group together with co-singer Maria Bramsen.

After two successful albums in 1982 and 1983 with hits like 'Ud under åben himmel' ('Out under the open sky') and 'Vi var engang så tæt' ('We were so close back then'), the founder and primary songwriter Kjellerup left the group and his songwriting duties were taken over by the others. The following album without their founder however, Tiden er klog from 1984, eventually became Tøsedrengene's all-time best selling album with hits like 'Indianer' ('Indian') and 'Så gik der tid med det' ('And then time passed'). The last album, I sikre hænder from 1985, although praised by some critics, became a commercial failure and Tøsedrengene disbanded shortly after its release.

Since the break-up the members of Tøsedrengene have continued in the Danish music industry and have had many appearances in the Danish charts with groups like Ray-dee-Ohh (1989-1992) and Danser med Drenge (1991 and onwards), and Anne Dorte Michelsen has been successful as a solo artist.

== Discography ==
=== Studio albums ===
- Det går fremad (1979)
- Tiden står stille (1981)
- Tøsedrengene 3 (1982)
- Alle vore håb (1983)
- Tiden er klog (1984)
- I sikre hænder (1985)
- Sig du kan li mig / De 40 bedste sange (2014)

=== With other artists ===
- Hallo hvor det koger /with Danser med Drenge (live, 2005)
