= Lars H.U.G. =

Danish musician

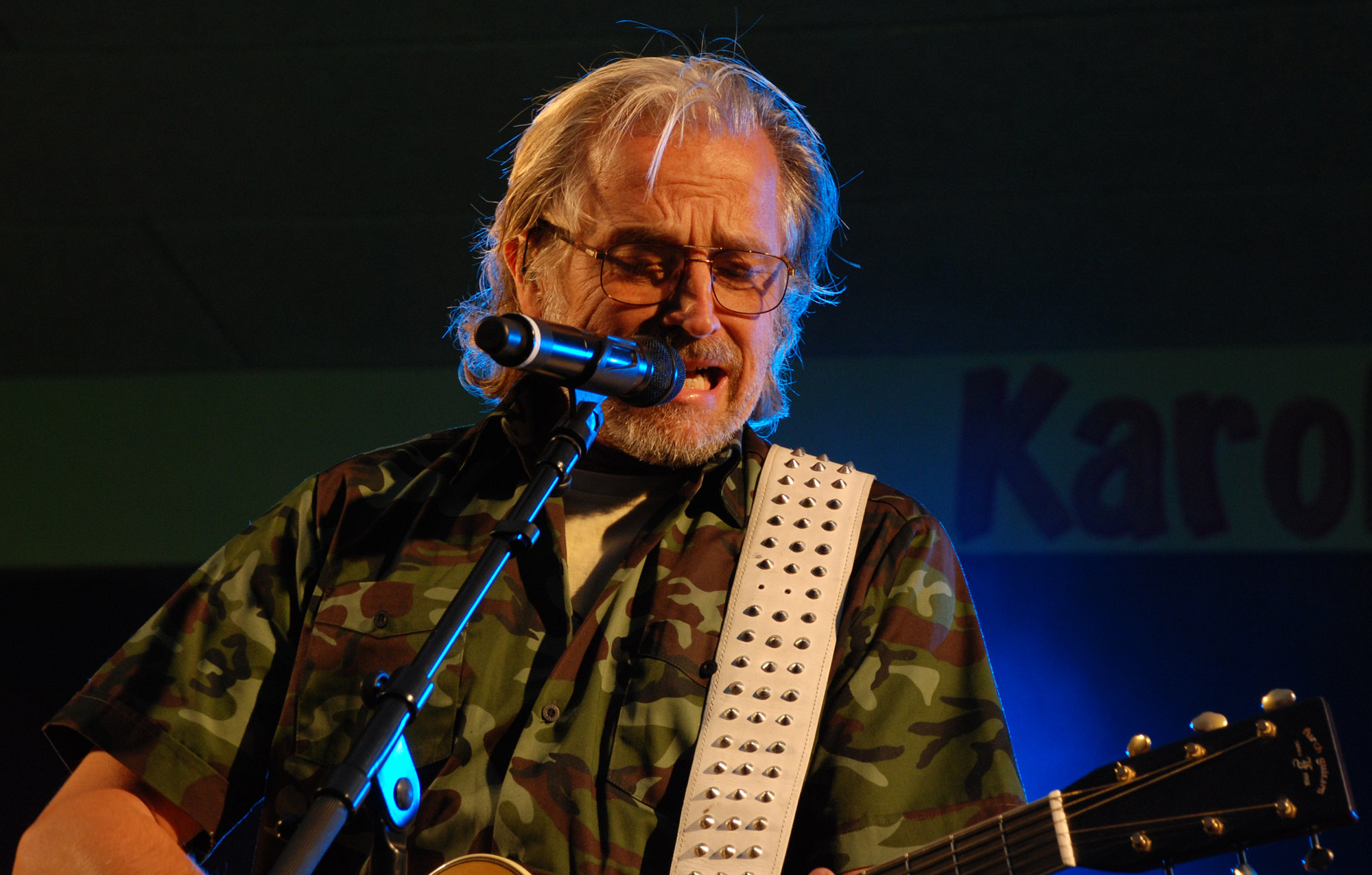
- Lars H.U.G performing in Aalborg in 2009

Background information
- Born: Lars Haagensen; 11 September 1953 (age 72); Sorgenfri, Denmark
- Genres: Rock, pop, new wave
- Occupations: Musician, painter
- Instruments: Guitar, vocals
- Years active: 1977–2016, 2019–present
- Website: www.larshug.dk

Lars H.U.G. (born Lars Haagensen on 11 September 1953) is a Danish musician and painter. He has produced several critically acclaimed albums as a solo artist, and has performed with the group Kliché.

Lars was born in Sorgenfri. Until the mid 1980s, he went by the name Lars Hug. Hug was the artist's childhood nickname and he also used it as a stage name. In 1987 he was sued by the pipe manufacturer Poul Erwin Hug, which forbid him from performing under their name. In response, he changed his name to Lars Hugh Uno Grammy, which he abbreviated as Lars H.U.G.

== Musical career ==
Lars H.U.G. began his career performing with the group Kliché, which formed in 1977, and released two albums. The group officially broke up in 1985. H.U.G. released his first album as a solo artist, City Slang, in 1984 while Kliché was on a break. The album was in collaboration Søren Ulrik Thomsen, and put music to the poet's anthology of the same title.

In 1993, he became the first rock musician to receive a work grant from the Danish Arts Foundation. He was nominated by the foundation for a lifetime performance award in 2003.

His last album, 10 Sekunders Stilhed, was released in 2014 and received gold certification. H.U.G announced his retirement as a musician at the Crown Prince Couple's Awards in 2016.

== Painting ==
At the age of 18, H.U.G enrolled at the Jutland Art Academy in Aarhus. He studied there from 1975 until 1978 as a painter. Several of his album covers feature his own art.

H.U.G. worked alongside Michael Kvium in Mojacar, Spain in 1988. He held his first major exhibition in 2001 at Gjethuset in Frederiksværk. He has since worked and been exhibited in Brooklyn, Berlin, Washington D.C., and Koroni. In 2009, he was invited to an exhibit in Washington DC by the Danish ambassador. He also held a guest lecture at the Corcoran School of the Arts while in DC. In 2010, he was invited to exhibit his works at the Danish Consulate in New York and to attend the Scandinavia House's Cultural Frontrunner Conference.

== Discography ==
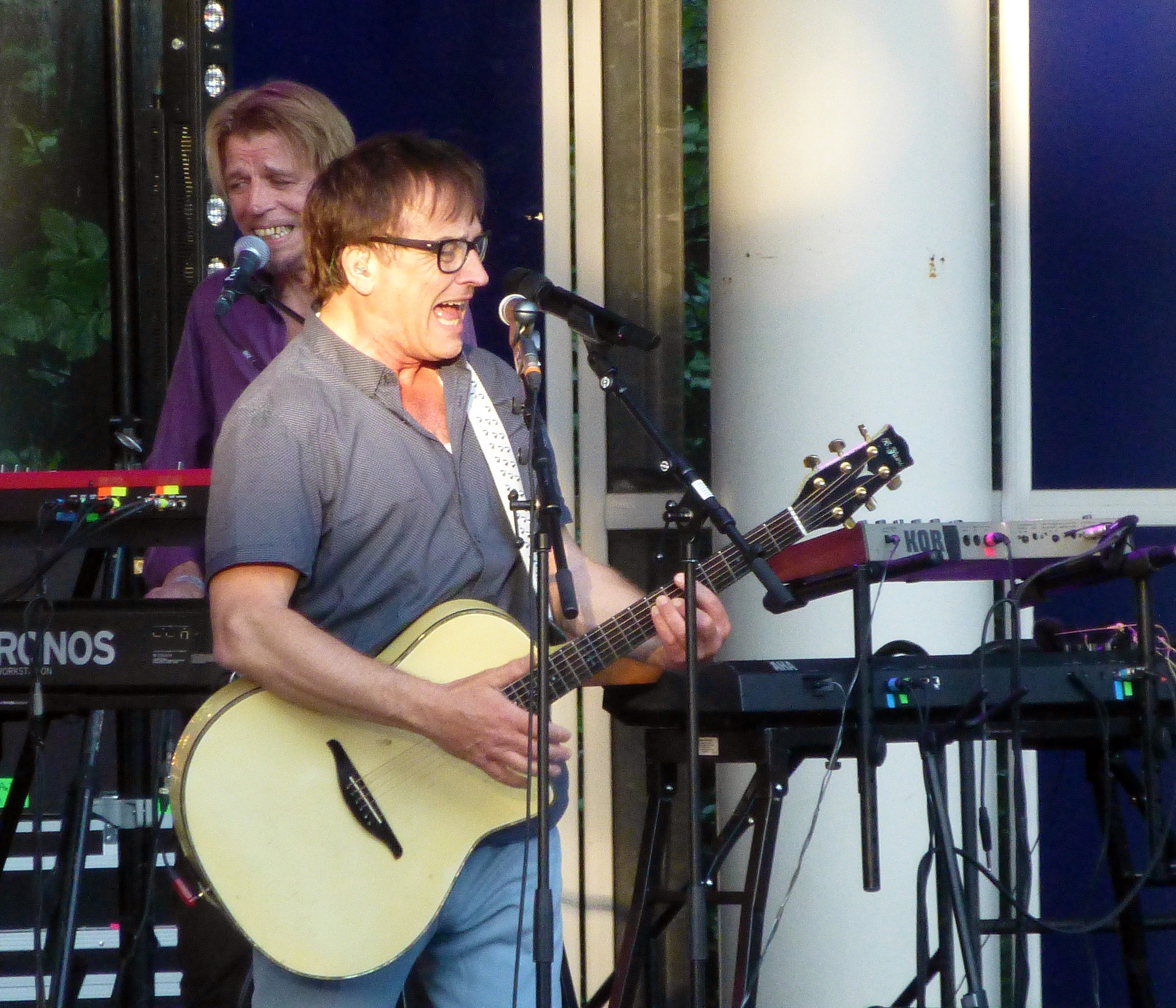
Lars Hug on stage at Tivoli Friheden in Aarhus in 2016.

For releases with the band Kliché, see Kliché.

=== Albums ===
- City Slang (with Søren Ulrik Thomsen) (Medley, 1984)
- Kysser himlen farvel (Medley, 1987)
- Kopy (Medley) 1989
- Blidt over dig (Medley, 1992)
- Kiss & Hug From a Happy Boy (featuring Once Around the Park) (Medley, 1996)
- Save Me from This Rock 'n' Roll (Medley, 2003)
- 10 sekunders stilhed (Genlyd, 2014)

=== EPs ===
- Replugged Live (Genlyd, 2015)

=== Compilation albums ===
- G.R.E.A.T.E.S.T. (Medley, 1993)
- Greatest H.U.G. (EMI, 2004)
- De første fra Lars H.U.G. (EMI, 2012)

== Awards and nominations ==
| Year | Award | Category | Result |
|---|---|---|---|
| 1990 | IFPI Awards | Danish Singer of the Year | Won |
| 1992 | GAFFA Awards | Concert of the Year | Won |
| 1992 | GAFFA Awards | Soloist of the Year | Won |
| 1993 | Danish Music Awards | Danish Album of the Year | Won |
| 1993 | Danish Music Awards | Danish Singer of the Year | Won |
| 1993 | Danish Music Awards | Danish Pop Release of the Year (Blidt over dig) | Won |
| 1993 | Danish Music Awards | Danish Songwriter of the Year | Nominated |
| 1996 | GAFFA Awards | Danish Soloist of the Year | Won |
| 1996 | GAFFA Awards | Danish Hit of the Year ("Waterfall") | Won |
| 1996 | GAFFA Awards | Danish Album of the Year (Kiss and Hug From A Happy Boy) | Won |
| 1997 | Danish Music Awards | Danish Album of the Year (Kiss & Hug From a Happy Boy) | Won |
| 1997 | Danish Music Awards | Danish Singer of the Year | Won |
| 1997 | Danish Music Awards | Danish Pop Release of the Year (Kiss & Hug From a Happy Boy) | Won |
| 2003 | Danish Arts Foundation | Lifetime Achievement Award | Nominated |
| 2015 | Danish Music Awards | Danish Release of the Year (10 Sekunders Stilhed) | Nominated |
| 2015 | Danish Music Awards | Danish Soloist of the Year | Nominated |
| 2015 | Danish Music Awards | Danish Live Performer of the Year | Nominated |
| 2015 | Danish Music Awards | Danish Songwriter of the Year | Nominated |
| 2016 | Steppeulven | Danish Live performer of the Year | Won |
