= Jan Sivertsen =

Danish painter

Jan Sivertsen (born 24 October 1951 in Frederiksberg, Denmark) is a Danish painter.

He was trained at the Royal Danish Academy of Fine Arts in Copenhagen 1977-1982. Since 1982 he lives and works in Paris, France.
