= Steffen Brandt =

Danish singer-songwriter and composer

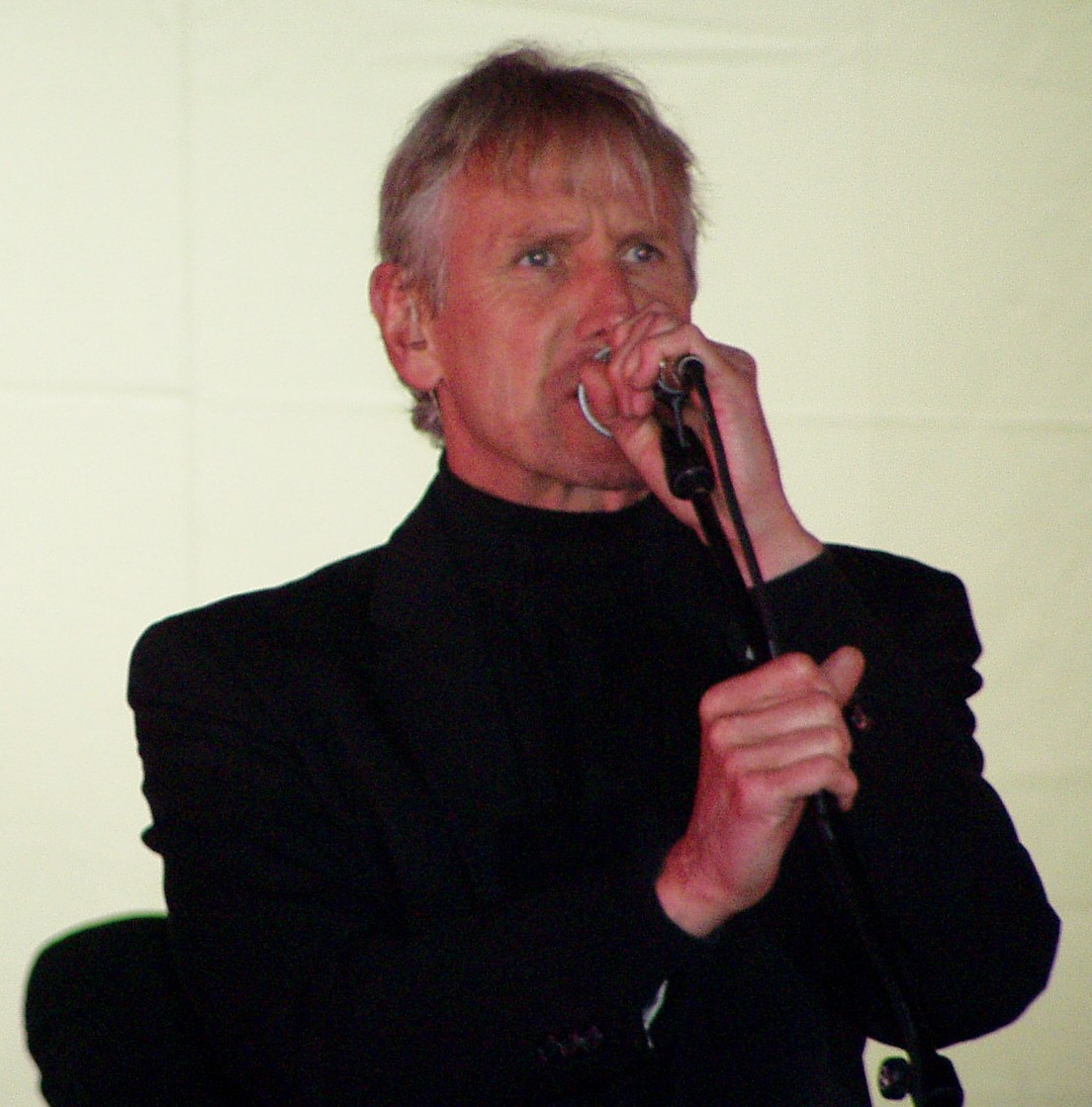

Background information
- Born: 14 June 1953 (age 71); Åbyhøj, Aarhus, Denmark
- Genres: Pop, pop rock
- Occupation(s): Singer, songwriter, author, musician

Steffen Brandt (born 14 June 1953 in Åbyhøj) is a Danish singer-songwriter and composer. Since 1981 he has been the lead singer of rock group TV-2, and he wrote both the text and music of all the group's songs.

In 2003 he received the Modersmål language award for his contribution to music in the Danish language.
