= Nephew discography =

Discography of Danish rock band Nephew

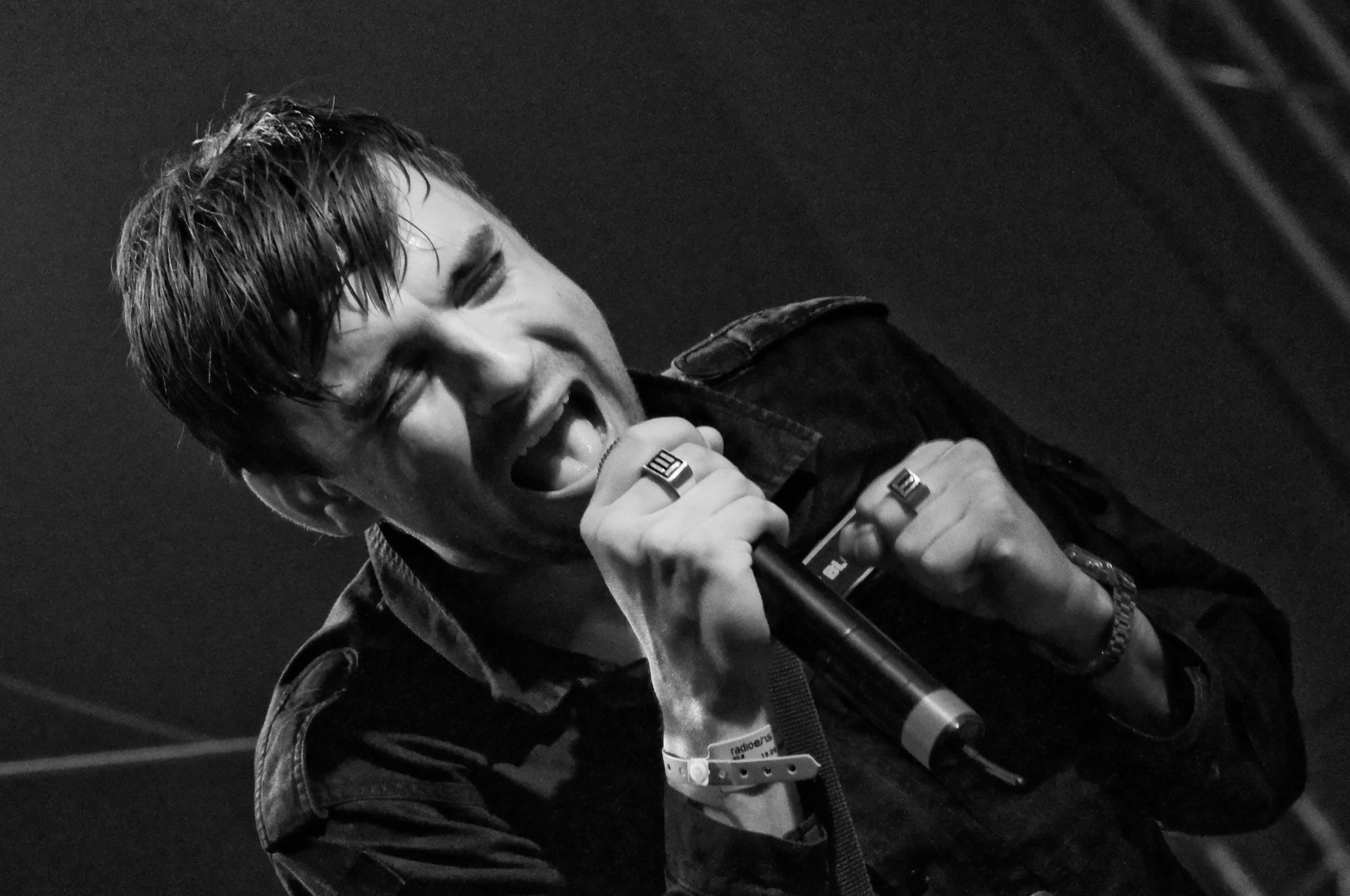
- Lead vocalist, keyboardist, and songwriter Simon Kvamm in 2008.
- Studio albums: 6
- EPs: 5
- Live albums: 3
- Compilation albums: 1
- Singles: 19
- Box sets: 1
- Demos: 3

The discography of the Danish rock band Nephew consists of six studio albums, three live albums, nine EPs, one compilation album, and one box set. The band was formed in 1996 by Simon Kvamm, Kristian Riis, Jonas Juul Jeppesen, and Søren Arnholt. In 1998, bassist Jeppesen left the band and was replaced by the current bassist Kasper Toustrup.

In 1998, Nephew released two early demo albums, Tunes and Things to Do. The demo EP Downtown Europe was released in 1999. In 2000, the band debuted with their first studio album, Swimming Time, on the small label Martian Records. The album was received well by both critics and fans, but despite the band's success, the members decided to disband. During their 2001 farewell concert in Germany, the band rediscovered their passion for music and ultimately decided to stay together.

After being signed to Copenhagen Records, the band released their second studio album USADSB in 2004. It was certified double platinum in Denmark and was also released in Japan, Germany, and Norway. It is considered to be their "breakthrough" album. Later in 2004, Nephew released the En Wannabe Darth Vader single release, containing the Danish and English-language versions of their hit song "En Wannabe Darth Vader".

Nephew's third studio album, Interkom Kom Ind, was released in October 2006; it was certified 3× platinum in Denmark. "Igen & Igen &" is its lead single. The Mexico Ligger i Spanien Remix EP was released later in 2007, which contains remixes of the song "Mexico Ligger i Spanien" by Mofus and Klovn, as well as an extended mix and a short intro version. In November 2007, Nephew released a live box set (Live-CD/2DVD) entitled Roskilde 07.07.07 based upon a critically acclaimed live performance at Orange Scene at the 2007 Roskilde Festival. The Live CD features songs from the albums USADSB and Interkom Kom Ind, including a special version of "Hospital" which features a guest performance by Danish rapper L.O.C.. The special edition of the box also includes the band's remix of the Timbaland track "The Way I Are".

On June 5, 2009, Nephew released their fourth studio album, Danmark/Denmark, which was certified double platinum in Denmark. The album was released on the Danish constitution day. In 2010, the Police Bells & Church Sirens EP was released, containing a radio edit, a "Dainty Doll's Trend Mix", and "Nephew's Nightlife Mix" (mixed by René Munk Thalund) of the song "Police Bells & Church Sirens". The EP also contained one previously unreleased track, "Jesus Jesus".

In November 2012, Nephew released their fifth studio album, Hjertestarter, which topped charts in Denmark and on the Danish iTunes store for that month.

On 18 November 2013, Nephew released an album boxset, 1-2-3-4-5, as well as a compilation of singles, Igen & Igen &. 1-2-3-4-5 contains Nephew's five studio albums along with 15 bonus songs; early renditions of the songs "USADSB", "Mexico Ligger i Spanien", "Hospital", "007 Is Also Gonna Die", and "Hjertestarter; a remix of "Downtown Europe" by Ørtz/Mofus; an alternative version of "Worst/Best Case Scenario"; an early version of "Superliga"; the previously unreleased demo songs "Swedenborg" and "Marking Princess"; and pre-mixes of the previously unreleased "Pasfotografier", "Automatisk Mig", "Stop Nu Hjælp Nu", "The Day I Laminate My Heart", and "Jeg Kan Se". It also contains the song "Statusopdaterer At Jeg Statusopdaterer" featuring Johnson. Nephew's compilation album, Igen & Igen &, was also released in 2013 and contains a collection of all of the band's singles currently released at that time.

Nephew released their sixth studio album, Ring-i-Ring, on 27 September 2018.

== Albums ==
=== Studio albums ===
Title	Album details	Peak position	Certification
Title	Album details	DEN	Certification
Swimming Time	Release date: 3 May 2000; Record label: Martian Records; Re-released: 14 February 2005; Record Label Copenhagen Records; Format: CD	15	
USADSB	Release date: 30 June 2004; Record label: Copenhagen Records; Format: CD	1	7× Platinum
Interkom Kom Ind	Release date: 6 October 2006; Record label: Copenhagen Records; Format: LP, CD, download	1	3× Platinum
Danmark/Denmark	Release date: 5 June 2009; Record label: Copenhagen Records; Format: LP, CD, download	1	2× Platinum
Hjertestarter	Release date: 2 November 2012; Record label: Copenhagen Records; Format: LP, CD, download	1	Platinum
Ring-i-Ring	Release date: 27 September 2018; Record label: Copenhagen Records; Format: LP, CD, download	1	

=== Live albums ===
Year	Album	Peak position
Year	Album	DEN
2004	USADSB 10 x så live	–
2007	Roskilde 07.07.07	2
2013	Hjertestarter 10 x så live	25

=== Compilation albums ===
Year	Album	Peak position
Year	Album	DEN
2013	Greatest Hits - Igen & Igen &	8

=== Box sets ===
Year	Album	Peak position
Year	Album	DEN
2013	1-2-3-4-5 (Greatest Hits Box)	15

=== Demo albums ===
Year	Album
1998	Tunes
1998	Things to Do

=== EPs ===
- 1998: Tunes (demo)
- 1998: Things to Do (demo)
- 1999: Downtown Europe (demo)
- 2007: Mexico Ligger i Spanien Remix EP
- 2010: Police Bells & Church Sirens EP
- 2018: Vinter-i-Ring
- 2018: Forår-i-Ring
- 2018: Sommer-i-Ring
- 2018: Efterår-i-Ring

== Singles ==
Year	Single	Peak position	Certification	Album
Year	Single	DEN	Certification	Album
2007	"Hospital" feat. L.O.C.	1		Interkom Kom Ind
2008	"Allein Alene" (Polarkreis 18 vs Nephew)	3		Polarkreis 18 album The Colour of Snow
2009	"007 Is Also Gonna Die"	1		Danmark/Denmark
2009	"Va Fangool!"	10		Danmark/Denmark
2010	"Police Bells and Church Sirens"	6		Danmark/Denmark
2010	"The Danish Way to Rock" (feat. Landsholdet)	1		Non-album release
2012	"Hjertestarter"	6		Hjertestarter
2012	"Klokken 25"	19		Hjertestarter
2013	"Gå med dig" (feat. Marie Key)	1	Gold	Hjertestarter
2018	"Amsterdam"	30		Ring-i-Ring
2018	"Rejsekammerater" (featuring Nik & Jay)	17		Ring-i-Ring

Others

- 2000: "We Don't Need You Here"
- 2003: "Movie Klip"
- 2004: "En Wannabe Darth Vader"
- 2004: "Superliga"
- 2004: "Ordenspoliti"
- 2005: "Worst/Best Case Scenario"
- 2005: "Byens Hotel"
- 2006: "Igen & Igen &"
- 2006: "Science Fiction Og Familien"
- 2007: "Mexico Ligger I Spanien"
- 2007: "The Way I Are" (Timbaland vs. Nephew)
- 2009: "Sov for Satan Mand"
