= Superliga (song) =

2004 song by Nephew

"Superliga" is a single by Danish rockband Nephew from their 2004 album USADSB. It was released as the third single from their second album USADSB.

The song deals with the hidden message of love and the song mentions a lot of famous people. Celebrities mentioned include: Jason Watt, Rasmus Trads, Britney Spears, Kurt Cobain, Michael Stipe, Wesley Snipes, Jimmy Floyd Hasselbaink, O. J. Simpson, Katja Kean, Don Ø, Bjarne Riis, Brian Steen Nielsen, Mogens Amdi Petersen, Pia Kjærsgaard, Johnny Cash, Simon Kvamm

== Music video ==
A music video for the song was released that same year. The clip was directed by Jakob Thorbek and Rasmus Meisler. The video received the award for "Best video of the Year" at the Danish Music Award 2005. In the video, Nephew frontman Simon Kvamm's younger brother, dances with a T-shirt, that constantly changes its lettering as various celebrities are mentioned in the song. The film's color theme switches constantly between red, blue and yellow.

== Awards ==
- The song won the GAFFA Prize in 2004 for the 2004 Danish Hit of the Year.
- The music video won the 2005 "Best Danish Video of the Year" at the Danish Musc Awards
