= The Danish Way to Rock =

Single by Nephew feat. Landsholdet
- Released: 2010
- Recorded: 2010
- Genre: Rock
- Songwriter(s): Simon Kvamm (lyrics); Nephew (music)
- Producer(s): Carsten Heller

Nephew feat. Landsholdet singles chronology
"The Danish Way to Rock" (2010)	"Vi vandt i dag" (2012)

Music video
- "The Danish Way to Rock" on YouTube

"The Danish Way to Rock" is a Danish language 2010 FIFA World Cup theme song for Denmark and a hit single by Danish band Nephew featuring Landsholdet (meaning "the national team" in Danish). The song went straight into #1 in the Tracklisten, the Danish Singles Chart.

"The Danish Way to Rock" was a song written in Danish (despite its English language title) by Nephew band member Simon Kvamm and music by the band Nephew and arranged and produced by Nephew and Carsten Heller. The song was released in cooperation with the Dansk Boldspil-Union (DBU), the Danish Football Association for the support of the 2010 Denmark national football team.

== Recording ==
The song was recorded on 1 March 2010. That day, the members of the Danish band Nephew and vocalist Simon Kvamm and guitarist Kristian Riis accompanied by song producer Carsten Heller travelled to Vienna, Austria, where the Denmark national team was scheduled to compete and briefed the team of the song and their part. Some players notably Daniel Jensen and Nicklas Bendtner recorded their parts separately, then a collective take was made of the entire group singing in a hotel room. Footage of the recording process was made available.

== Credits ==
- Lyrics: Simon Kvamm
- Music: Nephew
- Arrangement: Nephew and Carsten Heller
- Drums: Søren Arnholt
- Bas: Kasper Toustrup
- Vocals and keys: Simon Kvamm
- Guitars: Kristian Riis
- Keys: René Munk Thalund
- Chorus vocals by Landsholdet/Denmark national football team
- Additional vocals: Søren Arnholt and Kristian Riis
- Production, recording and mix: Carsten Heller
- Recorded at Carsten Heller
  - Player chorus recorded at Courtyard Vienna Messe Hotel
  - Additional recordings at Walkie Talkie Boy Studio, Coach Studio and Funkydev Studio

== Chart performance ==
The single was released in March 2010 and reached #1 on chart of 23 April 2010 staying 1 week at the top of the Danish Singles Chart.

Tracklisten (2010)	Highest position
Denmark (Tracklisten)	1
