= De eneste to (album) =

Studio album by De Eneste To
- Released: 11 October 2010
- Genre: Pop, Pop rock
- Length: 47:36 (51:29 with bonus track)
- Language: Danish
- Label: Sony Music, Copenhagen Records
- Producer: Peter Sommer, Simon Kvamm, Stefan Kvamm

De Eneste To chronology
De eneste to (2010)	Det lyder radikalt (2011)

Singles from De eneste to
- 1. "Morten" Released: 16 August 2010; 2. "Jeg har ikke lyst til at dø" Released: 2010; 3. "Østjylland Dreaming" Released: 24 January 2011; 4. "Den lige vej (Carsten Heller Remix)" Released: 1 July 2011

De eneste to is the debut album from the Danish pop duo De Eneste To. It was released on 11 October 2010. The first single released was "Morten", on 16 August 2010. On 22 October 2010, the album appeared at number one on Tracklisten, the Danish Albums Chart. In late January 2011, the album was certified platinum.

== Track listing ==
All tracks are written by Peter Sommer and Simon Kvamm.

No.	Title	Length
1.	"Østjylland Dreaming"	4:22
2.	"Hvem springer du for"	3:36
3.	"Aftenbøn"	3:42
4.	"Jeg har ikke lyst til at dø"	4:37
5.	"Den lige vej"	3:53
6.	"De gode gamle dumme unge"	5:17
7.	"Morten"	4:09
8.	"Tester"	4:43
9.	"Det var det der slog dig da du faldt"	3:37
10.	"Alle har en fortid"	5:20
11.	"Hell Yeah"	4:20

iTunes bonus track
No.	Title	Length
12.	"Vi er de eneste to"	3:53
