= Landsholdet =

Denmark national football team

Landsholdet is the popular name of the Denmark national football team. The name is also used for musical releases in the form of collaborations by Danish association football (soccer) players with Danish known artists.

- Landsholdet is credited for the 2010 song "The Danish Way to Rock" by the Danish band Nephew. The single reached #1 on the Danish Singles Chart for 2 weeks.
- Landsholdet is also credited for the 2012 song "Vi vandt i dag" by the Danish hip hop duo Nik & Jay. The single reached #5 in the Danish Singles Chart.

== Discography ==
(Selective and only charting singles)

Year	Single	Peak chart positions	Certifications	Album
Year	Single	DEN	Certifications	Album
1986	"Re-Sepp-Ten" (Dodo & Landsholdet)	—		
1998	"Vi vil ha' sejren i land" (Dodo & Landsholdet)	—		
2000	"All We Need Is Love" (Landsholdet feat. Det Brune Punktum)	—		
2004	"Hvor vi fra" (Landsholdet feat. Safri Duo, Birthe Kjær and B-Boys)	—		
2010	"The Danish Way to Rock" (Nephew feat. Landsholdet)	1		
2012	"Vi vandt i dag" (Nik & Jay feat. Landsholdet)	2		
