= Vi vandt i dag =

Single by Nik & Jay featuring Landsholdet
- Released: 2012
- Recorded: 2012
- Genre: Rock

Nik & Jay featuring Landsholdet singles chronology
"The Danish Way to Rock" (2010)	"Vi vandt i dag" (2012)

Music video
- "Vi vandt i dag" on YouTube

"Vi vandt i dag" is a 2012 Danish language football themed song and a hit single by Danish hip hop duo Nik & Jay featuring Landsholdet (meaning the national football team in Danish).

Nik and Jay are shown on the cover of the single released, wearing the national football team red shirt jerseys with names Niclas and Jannik and team number 1.

== Charts ==
The song has reached #2 in the Tracklisten, the Danish Singles Chart after release on Copenhagen Records / Universal Music.

Peak (2012)	Highest position
Denmark (Tracklisten)	2
