= Peter Sommer =

Danish singer and songwriter

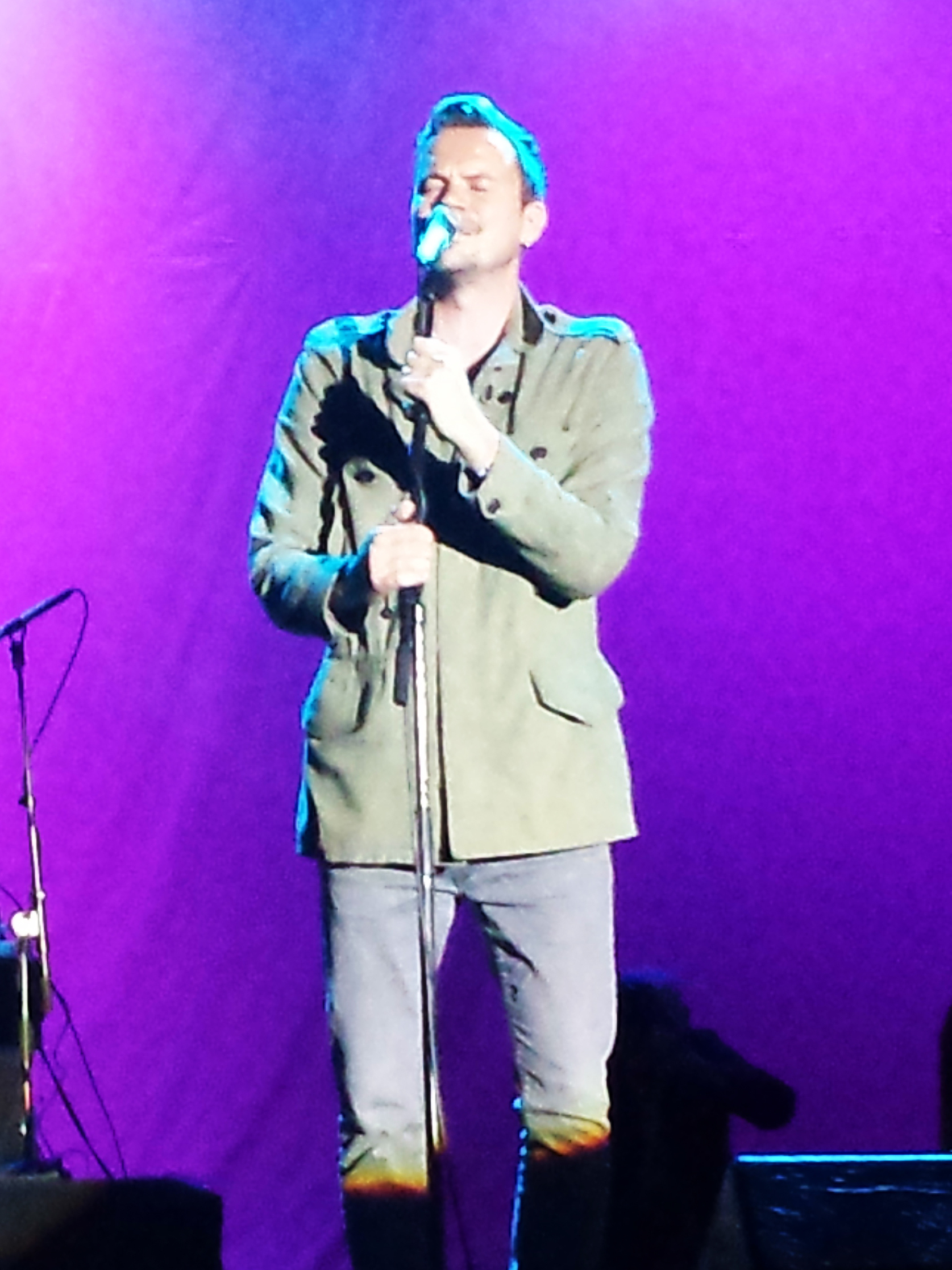
- Peter Sommer during Smukfest (2013)

Background information
- Born: Peter Sommer Christensen; 28 August 1974 (age 52); Aarhus, Denmark
- Genres: Pop, Pop rock
- Occupation: Singer
- Years active: Since 2002
- Member of: De Eneste To
- Formerly of: Superjeg
- Website: www.petersommer.dk

Superjeg
- Origin: Denmark
- Genre: Pop rock
- Years active: 2000–2003
- Label: Universal Music
- Past members: Peter Sommer; Carsten Valentin Lassen

Peter Sommer Christensen (born 28 August 1974 in Skanderborg) is a Danish singer and songwriter. His lyrics are often characterized by interesting puns and word plays. Besides his solo career, he was in the duo Superjeg with Carsten Valentin Lassen, and is currently part of the duo De Eneste To alongside Simon Kvamm.

== In duo Superjeg ==
In the early 2000s, Peter Sommer and Carsten Valentin Lassen formed the pop rock duo Superjeg. Sommer was lead vocals and also played bass, whereas Lassen played guitar and keyboards. The duo used many double meanings and puns in their musical output and released two albums: Alt er ego in 2002 and Øst/Vest in 2003, both on the label Auditorium (2). The duo has never officially disbanded, but they have not produced any content together since.

== Solo ==
In 2004, Peter Sommer released his debut solo album, På den anden side, which cracked the Top 5 in Denmark. The single "Valby Bakke" was selected as Ugens Uundgåelige (week's pick), a label given to rising artists by Danish radio station P3; however, it never charted. In 2006, his follow-up album Destruktive vokaler won him a prize from Statens Kunstfond (the Danish Arts Foundation), and, in 2007, won the title of "Danish Pop Album of the Year". In 2008, he released his album Til rotterne, til kragerne, til hundene, which came with his first charting single "Rødt kort" and, in 2009, earned the title of "Danish Rock Album of the Year". Sommer won "Danish Male Artist of the Year" and "Danish Songwriter of the Year" at the 2009 Danish Music Awards. His album producer Henrik Balling won Producer of the Year for his work with Sommer.

== In duo De Eneste To ==
In 2010, Peter Sommer formed the duo De Eneste To with Simon Kvamm. In the same year, the duo released their self-titled album De eneste to, which topped Tracklisten, the Danish Albums Chart. At following concerts, they announced that they would be taking a short break, marking the end of the "first chapter". At the same time, they promised to be back in 3–4 years with new material and a new album. Keeping their promise, Dobbeltliv was released in 2014, peaking at No. 3 on the Danish Albums Chart.

== Personal life ==
Peter Sommer was married to Danish musician Lise Westzynthius. They had a son, Ivan, together, and later divorced in 2009.

== Discography ==
=== Albums ===
Solo

Year	Album	Peak
Year	Album	DEN
2004	På den anden side	5
2006	Destruktive vokaler	4
2008	Til rotterne, til kragerne, til hundene	6
2013	Alt forladt	2
2018	Elskede at drømme, drømmer om at elske	2
2020	Stærk strøm hen over ujævn bund	2
2021	PSPHPT	9
2022	De uforelskede i København	2
2025	Verdens Volume	3
2026	Peter Sommer – Live at Vega	7
2026	PSPHPT 2	16

with Superjeg

Year	Album
2002	Alt er ego
2003	Øst/Vest

with De Eneste To

Year	Album	Peak	Certification
Year	Album	DEN	Certification
2010	De eneste to	1	Platinum
2011	Det lyder radikalt – Remix EP	9	
2014	Dobbeltliv	3	
2015	Friday I'm in Love	–	

=== Singles ===
Solo

Year	Song	Peak	Album
Year	Song	DEN	Album
2008	"Rødt kort"	33	Til rotterne, til kragerne, til hundene
2013	"Hvorfor Løb Vi?"	40	Alt forladt

with De Eneste To

Year	Song	Peak	Certification	Album
Year	Song	DEN	Certification	Album
2010	"Morten"	9	Gold (download)	De eneste to
2010	"Jeg har ikke lyst til at dø"	–	Gold (download); Gold (streaming)	De eneste to
2011	"Østjylland Dreaming"	–		De eneste to
2011	"Den lige vej" (Carsten Heller Remix)	32		Det lyder radikalt – Remix EP
2014	"Sult"	17		Dobbeltliv
2014	"Skrig det til træerne"	25		Dobbeltliv
