= Re-Sepp-Ten =

1986 Danish language football song

Single by VM Holdet
- Released: 1986
- Recorded: 1986
- Genre: Pop
- Length: 4:30
- Label: Replay Records
- Songwriters: Jarl Friis-Mikkelsen, Henrik Bødtcher, readers of Ekstra Bladet (lyrics); Michael Bruun (music)
- Producer: Michael Bruun

"Re-Sepp-Ten" is a 1986 Danish language football song released on Replay Records that was battle song for the Denmark national football team for 1986 FIFA World Cup in Mexico. The song was credited to VM Holdet (World Cup Team) as the Denmark national side is known as Landsholdet. The song was recorded in the Werner studio by the Denmark national football team with additional contributions by Dodo Gad, Jens Rud and Steen Christiansen, all from the Danish band Dodo and the Dodos, Poul Halberg and by Henrik Stanley Møller. The music was composed by Michael Bruun, and arranged and produced by him.

== Origin ==
For the World Cup 1986, the Danish daily Ekstra Bladet had solicited its readers to submit lyrics for a song to be launched in support of the Denmark national side. Out of the hundreds of submissions received, Jarl Friis-Mikkelsen and Henrik Bødtcher picked certain lines from the reader-submitted suggestions to create the final lyrics.

The title "Re-Sepp-ten" was a manipulation of the word "recepten" (the recipe) with "cep" being replaced by "Sepp" in honor of the then national team coach Sepp Piontek who had a big hand in launching the powerful national side affectionately known as the Danish Dynamite for many years.

The song is also popularly known as "Re-Sepp-Ten: Vi er røde, vi er hvide" taking a famous line from the song lyrics, that mean 'We are red, we are white', the two colors being the national colors of Denmark.

== Charts ==
The song became a huge hit in Denmark in 1986 with "Re-Sepp-Ten" becoming an iconic song sung at almost all the Danish national games.

The single also became a hit in Norway in 1986 reaching #3 and staying for 9 weeks in the Norwegian Singles Chart and in Sweden where it also reached #3 in the Swedish Singles Chart appearing for 3 weeks in the charts in June and July 1986.

In 2012, it made a reappearance in the Danish Singles Chart on occasion of the Denmark national football team reaching the finals at the Euro Cup 2012 as a new entry at #24. The official release for 2012 was "Vi vandt i dag" by Nik & Jay feat. Landsholdet, that reached #2 in June 2012.

== Track list ==
- Side A: "Re-Sepp-Ten" (4:30)
- Side B: "Re-Sepp-Ten Drible-Mix" (4:30)

== Vanilla Beans version ==
"Re-Sepp-Ten: Vi er røde, vi er hvide"

Single by Re-Sepp-Ten featuring Vanilla Beans
- Released: 2010
- Recorded: 2010
- Genre: Pop
- Label: Replay Records
- Songwriters: Jarl Friis-Mikkelsen, Henrik Bødtcher, readers of Ekstra Bladet (lyrics); Michael Bruun (music)
- Producer: Michael Bruun

For the 2010 FIFA World Cup held in South Africa, the song was re-recorded by the Japanese pop band Vanilla Beans known for their avid support of the Denmark national team. The pop duo sang a slightly abbreviated version of the song in Danish language but with an unmistakable Japanese accent, and this despite the fact that Denmark and Japan were to meet in the final pool match to the finals. The release retitled "Re-Sepp-ten: Vi er røde, vi er hvide". A music video was made with then-Danish Ambassador to Japan Franz-Michael Skjold Mellbin playing the part of Preben Elkjær in the video. The music video was produced and directed by Emil Langballe.
