= Smukfest =

Annual music festival in Denmark

Coordinates: 56.026°N 9.920°E

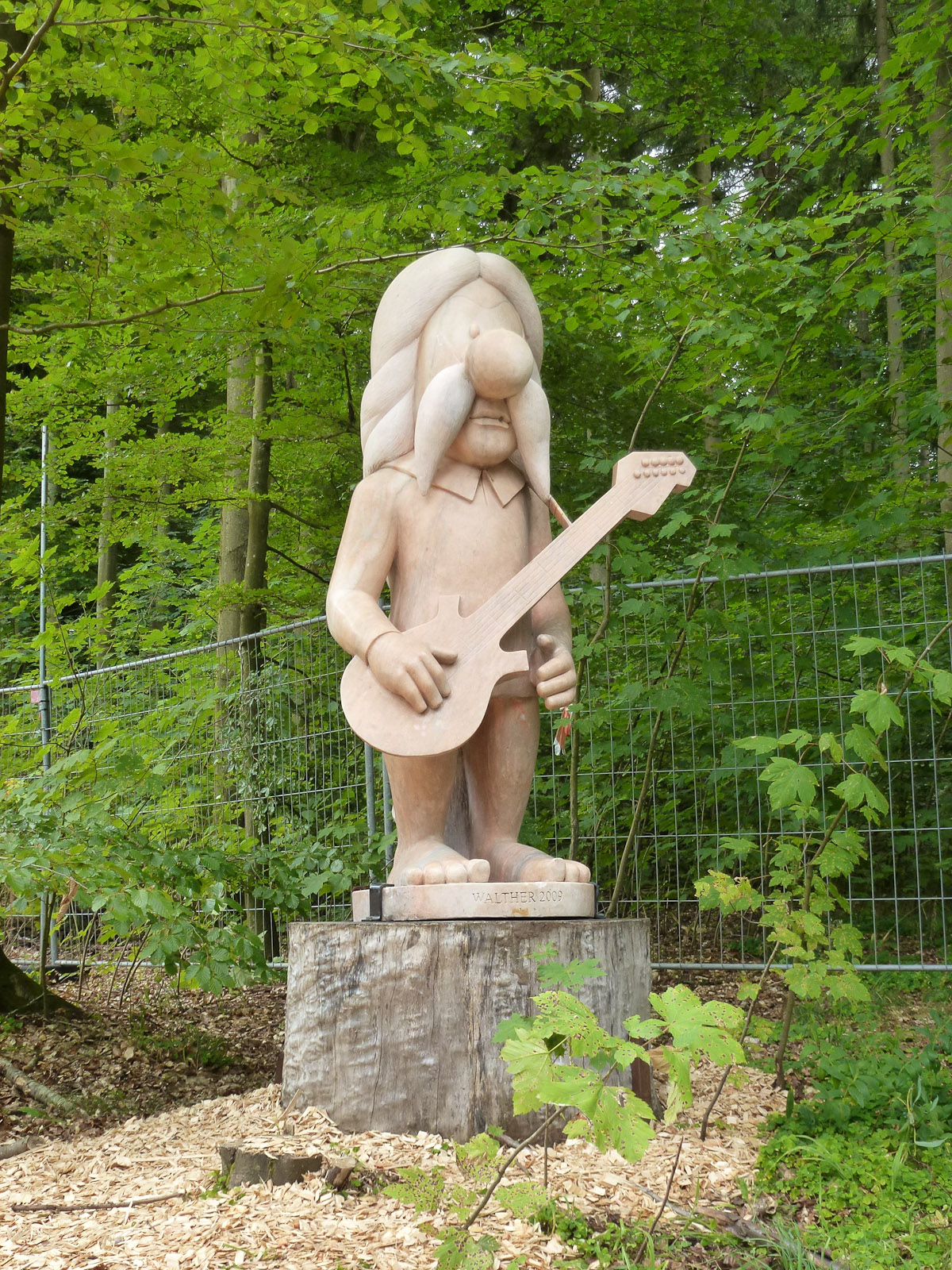
- FestiWalther, the mascot of the festival.
- Genre: Rock, heavy metal, pop, electronic, hip hop, blues and folk.
- Dates: 7 days in August
- Locations: Skanderborg, Denmark
- Years active: 1980–present
- Attendance: 60,000
- Website: Festival Website

Smukfest (also known as the Skanderborg Festival) is an annual music festival, held during the second weekend of August in Denmark. Its location, in a beech forest in the vicinity of Skanderborg, has given rise to the slogan "Denmark's Most Beautiful Festival" (Danish: Danmarks Smukkeste Festival).

The festival covers many styles of music, such as rock, pop, folk, heavy metal, hip-hop and electronic. The festival focuses mainly on Danish music, but with some big names from other countries e.g. Britney Spears, Eric Clapton, Prince, Pet Shop Boys, Ozzy Osbourne, Tom Jones, Robbie Williams, Fat Boy Slim, Blood Hound Gang, Rihanna and many more.

The first festival was held in 1980, and was a one-day event with 7 bands and about 600 spectators.

The festival has a mascot called "Waltidur Festismuk Kærligkys Ølimund Rockilund Trold" (Waltidur Party-beauty Loving-kiss Beer-in-mouth Rock-in-grove Troll), born in 1579, thus the festival was born on Waltidurs 400th birthday.

In 2009, Skanderborg Festival was held for the 30th time and is today the second largest festival in Denmark, after the Roskilde Festival. The festival gathered more than 50,000 people for the concerts, including 8,500 workers, most of them volunteers and has reached the current site's maximum capacity.

== Stages ==
The festival has 4 stages (2016):

1. Bøgescenerne / The Main Stages
2. P3-teltet (Danish National Radio has a station called P3)
3. Stjerne-scenen (Star Stage)
4. Sherwood-scenen (Sherwood Stage)

The festival main stage consist of two stages and is called "Bøgescenerne" (Beech stages).

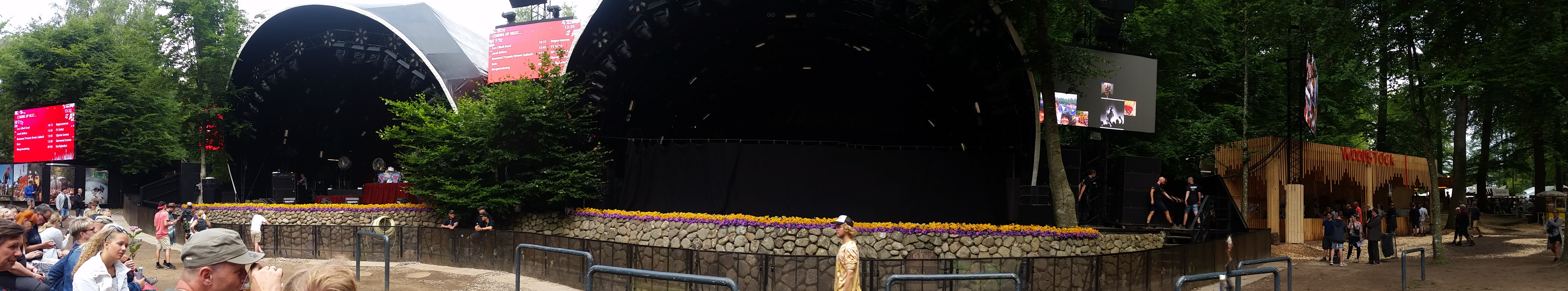
Bøgescenerne

== Music performances ==
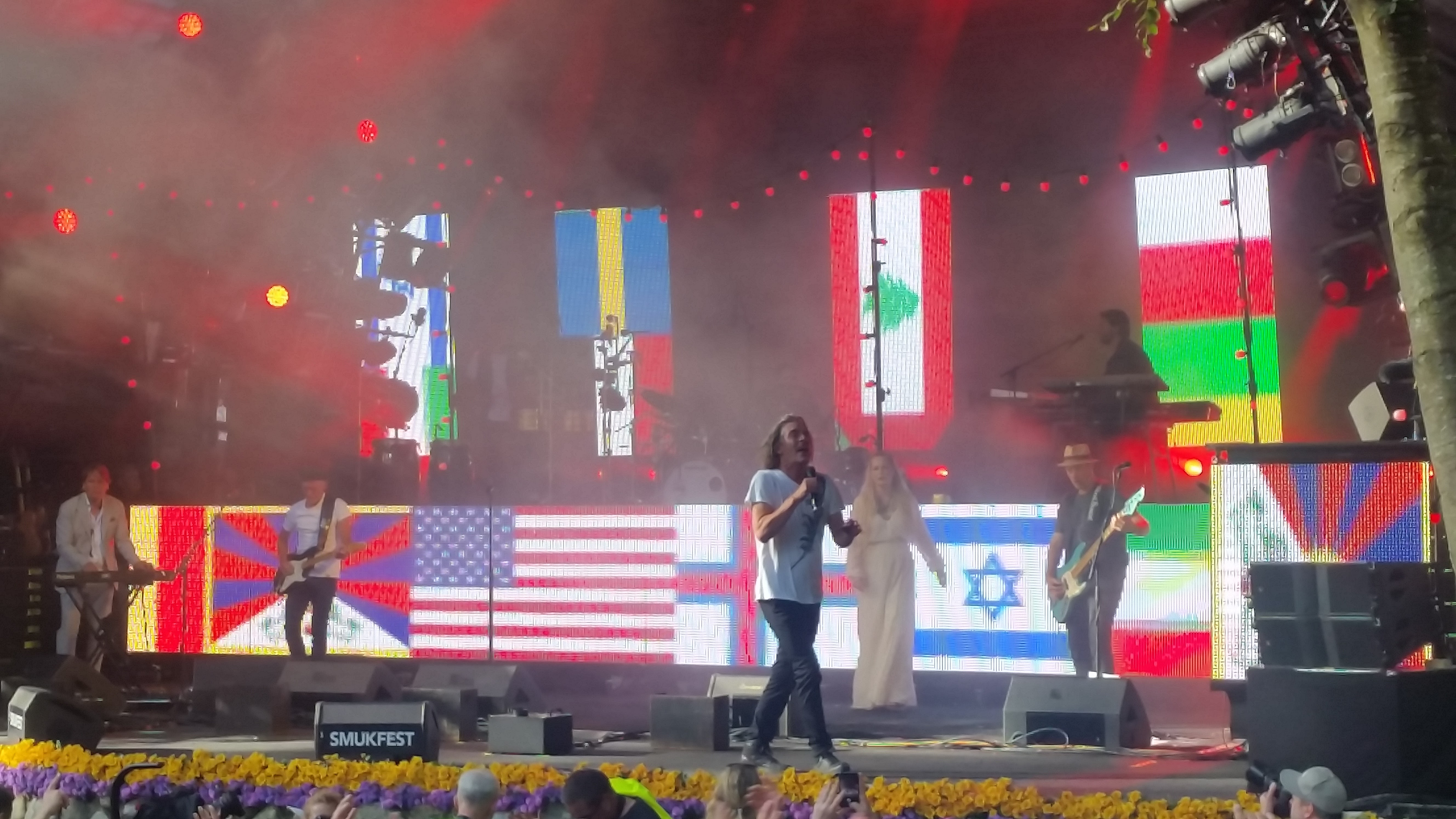
Gnags, 2016

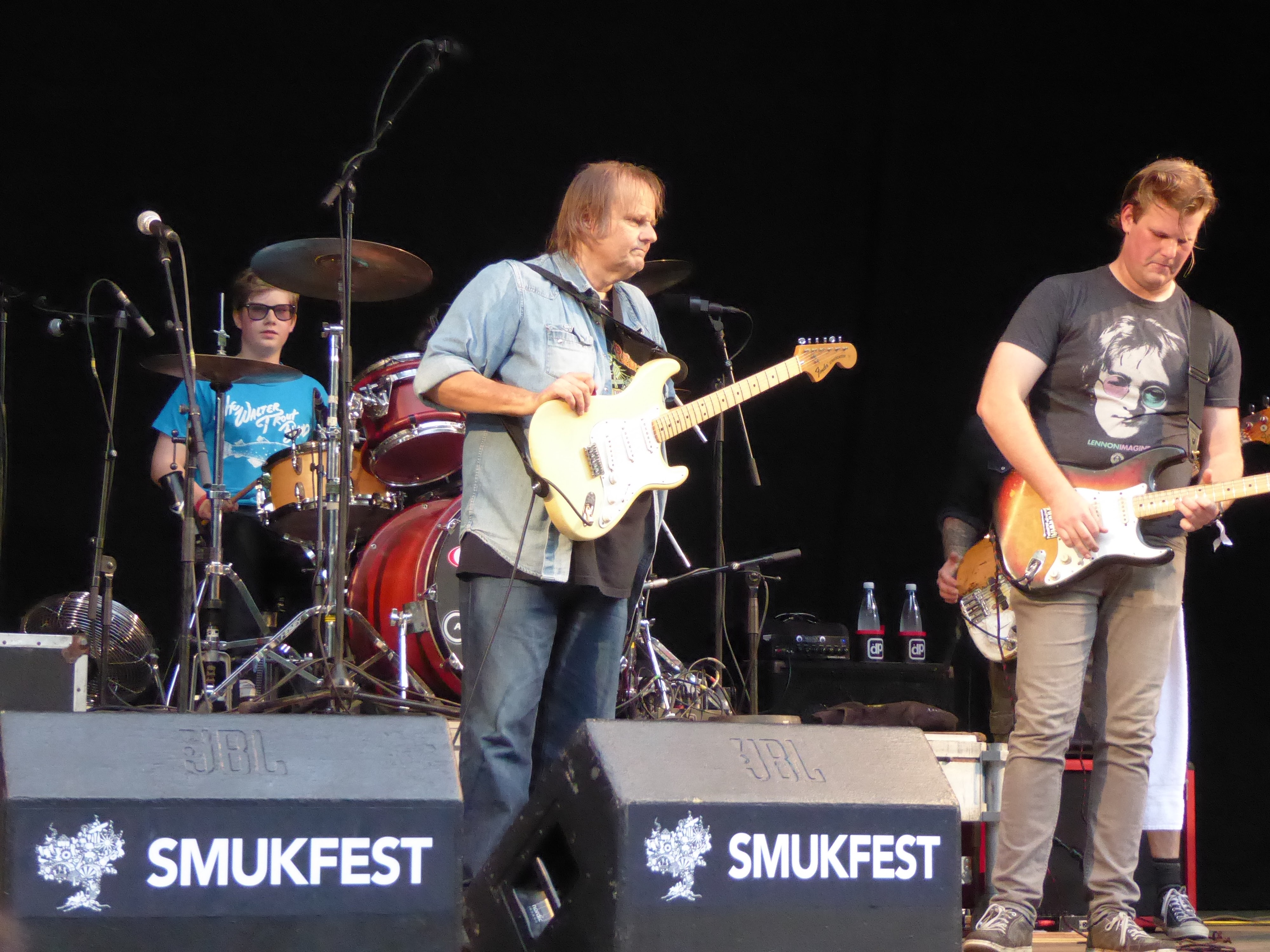
Walter Trout and sons, 2016

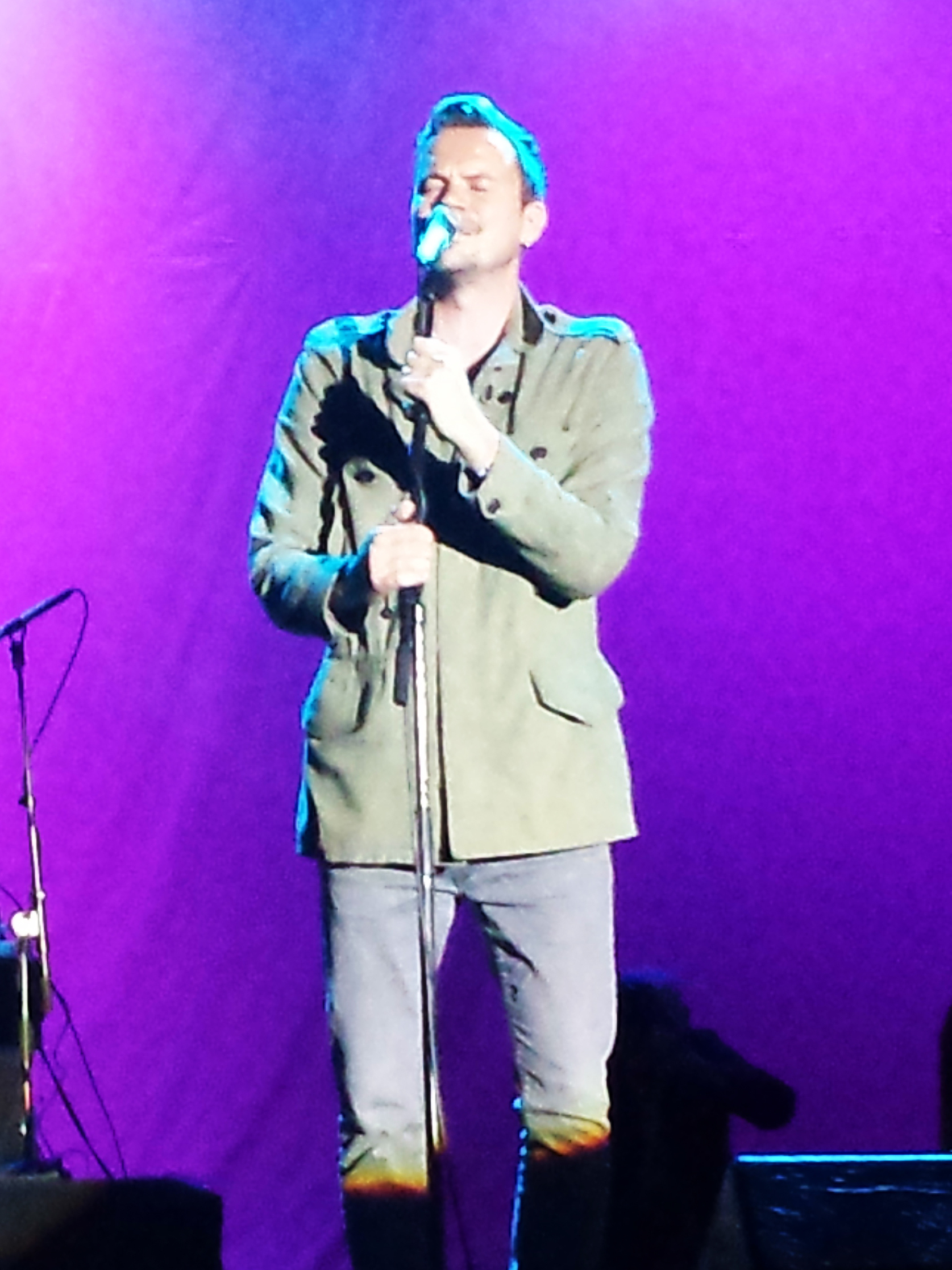
Peter Sommer, 2013

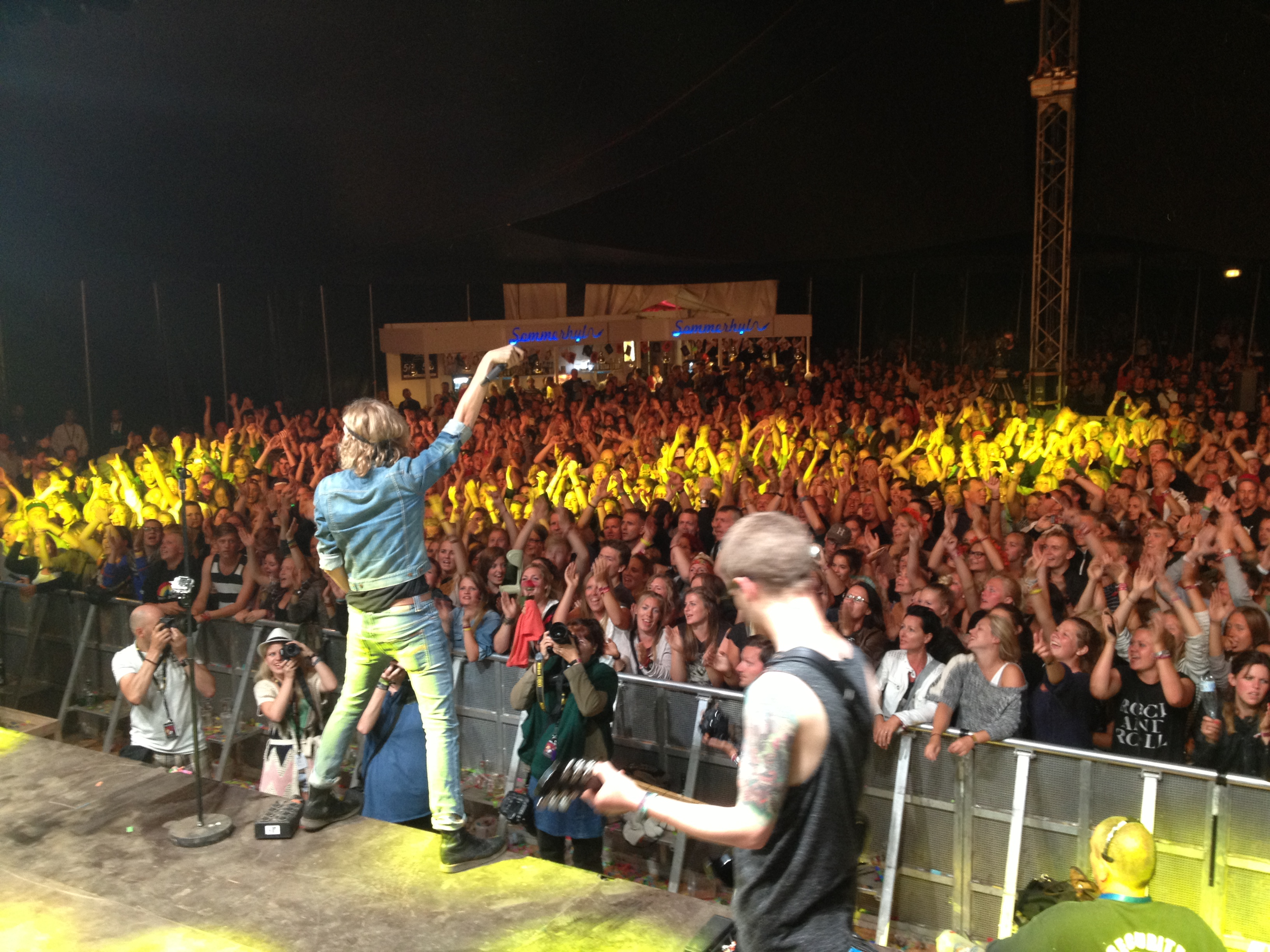
Dúné, 2013

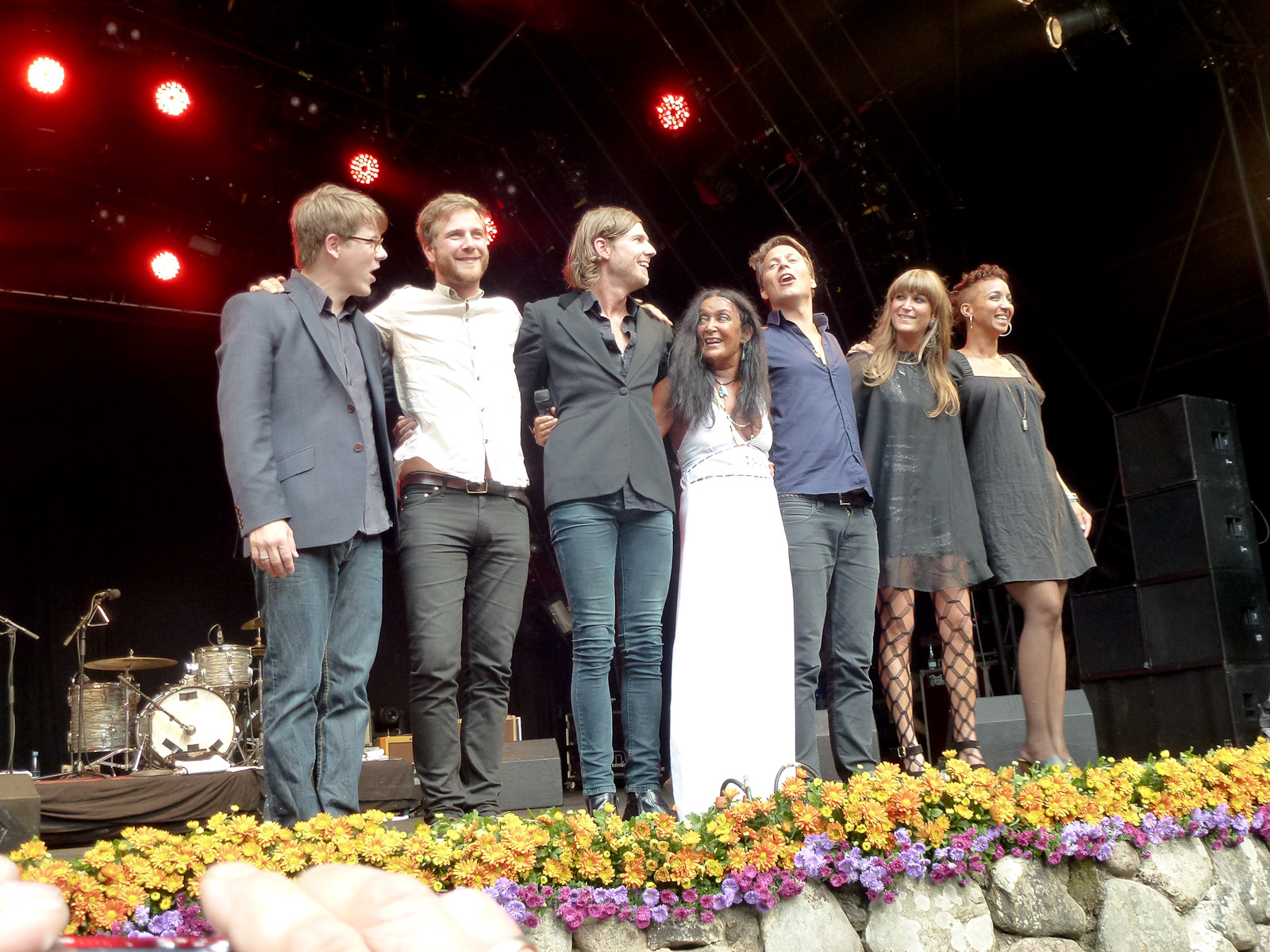
Savage Rose, 2011
