= Ring-i-Ring =

Studio album by Nephew
- Released: 27 September 2018
- Genre: Rock
- Length: 41:13
- Label: Copenhagen; Universal Music
- Producer: Nephew

Nephew chronology
Hjertestarter (2012)	Ring-i-Ring (2018)

Singles from Ring—i—Ring
- 1. "Amsterdam"; 2. "Rejsekammerater"

Professional ratings
Review scores
Source	Rating
Jyllands-Posten	4/6 stars

Ring-i-Ring is the sixth studio album by the Danish rock band Nephew. It was released on 27 September 2018 through Copenhagen Records and Universal Music, and debuted at number one on the Danish albums chart.

== Track listing ==
Ring-i-Ring track listing
No.	Title	Lyrics	Music	Length
1.	"Amsterdam"	Simon Kvamm	Nephew	4:16
2.	"Grundvold"	Kvamm	Nephew	4:30
3.	"Sig månen langsomt hæver"	Carsten Hauch	Nephew, J.A.P. Schulz	4:56
4.	"Frankenstein (I Ring Part 1)"	Kvamm	Nephew	3:36
5.	"DMII"	Kvamm	Nephew	3:26
6.	"Tropper"	Kvamm	Nephew	4:12
7.	"Rejsekammerater" ("Travel Companions"; with Nik & Jay)	Kvamm	Nephew	4:03
8.	"At dø er at rejse"	Kvamm	Nephew	4:37
9.	"Den blå anemone"	Kaj Munk	Egil Harder	3:51
10.	"Ancestor (I Ring Part 2)"	Kvamm	Nephew	3:47

== Charts ==
Chart performance for Ring-i-Ring
Chart (2018)	Peak position
Danish Albums (Hitlisten)	1

== Certifications ==
Certifications for Ring-i-Ring
Region	Certification	Certified units/sales
Denmark (IFPI Danmark)	Platinum	20,000^{‡}
^{‡} Sales+streaming figures based on certification alone.
