= De Eneste To =

Danish duo musical band

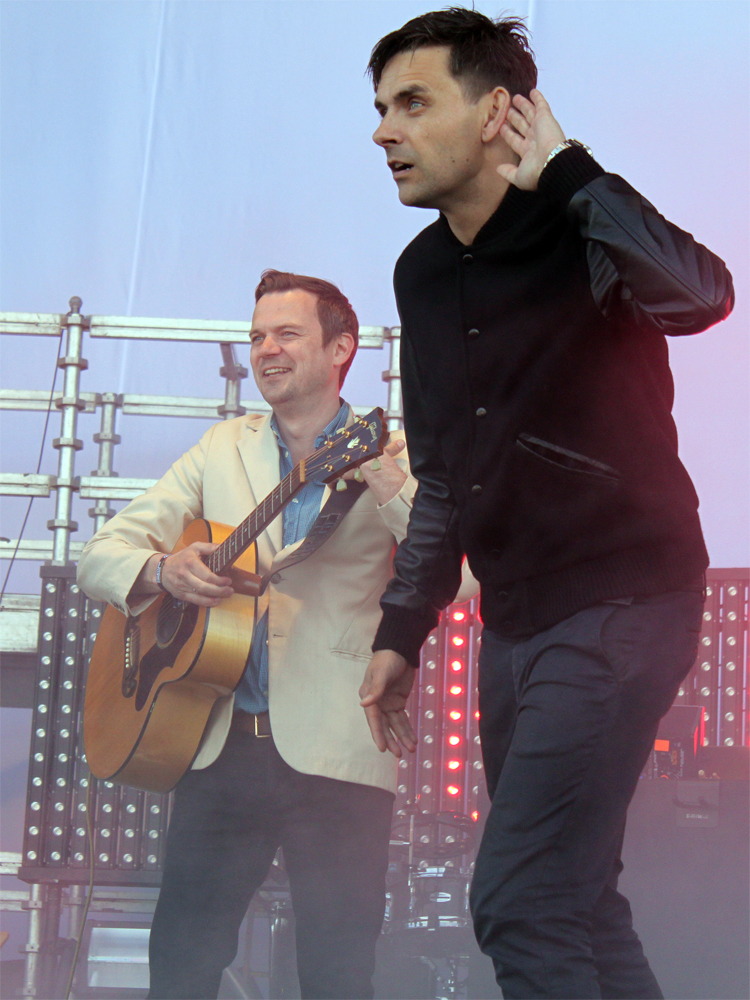
- De Eneste To performing at Jelling Musikfestival 2015

Background information
- Origin: Denmark
- Genres: Pop
- Years active: 2010–present
- Members: Peter Sommer; Simon Kvamm

De Eneste To (literally The Only Two in Danish) is a Danish band consisting of musicians Peter Sommer and Simon Kvamm. The band, which is also known by the acronym DET, was formed in 2010. In studio work and in live concerts, the duo's sound was accentuated with musical accompaniment by Stefan Kvamm (Simon Kvamm's brother) and Árni Bergmann. The duo has described their music as "industrial folk" and "singer-songwriter-techno".

== Career ==
The duo's self-titled debut album was released on 11 October 2010. It peaked at No. 1 in Tracklisten, the official Danish Albums Chart, and was certified platinum. The follow-up release on 15 August 2011 was the Remix EP Det lyder radikalt which included remixes of songs from De eneste to from Filur, Carsten Heller, and Asger Baden among others. The EP made it into the Top 10. The duo appeared at popular festivals like Grøn Koncert and Roskilde Festival, simultaneously announcing that they were shelving the duo project, marking the end of the "first chapter". In August 2011, Peter Sommer announced that the duo had plans to release their next album in "two to four years". Keeping their promise, Dobbeltliv was released in 2014, and peaked at No. 3 on Tracklisten.

== Award nominations ==
Despite the short span of the duo at that time (2010–2011), it was nominated for a great number of awards at the 2011 Danish Music Awards; for "Danish Album of the Year", "Songwriter of the Year", "Danish Group of the Year", "Best Danish Live Act" and "Audience Prize of the Year", the latter determined by the Danish public.

== Discography ==
=== Albums ===
Year	Album	Peak	Certification	Track list
Year	Album	DK	Certification	Track list
2010	De eneste to	1	Platinum	1. "Østjylland Dreaming" (4:22); 2. "Hvem springer du for" (3:36); 3. "Aftenbøn" (3:42); 4. "Jeg har ikke lyst til at dø" (4:37); 5. "Den lige vej" (3:53); 6. "De gode gamle dumme unge" (5:17); 7. "Morten" (4:09); 8. "Tester" (4:43); 9. "Det var det der slog dig da du faldt" (3:37); 10. "Alle har en fortid" (5:20); 11. "Hell Yeah" (4:20); iTunes bonus track: 12."Vi er de eneste to" (3:53)
2014	Dobbeltliv	3		1. "Skrig det til træerne" (3:34); 2. "Sult" (3:31); 3. "TV-druk" (3:44); 4. "Den lange bane" (3:38; 5. "Jyder i København" (3:44); 6. "Vive hjem" (3:38); 7. "For lidt for meget" (featuring Danni Toma) (3:08); 8. "Trafik" (4:12); 9. "Lisså forvirret som før" (4:51); 10. "Fyren i ruden (Epilog)" (4:17)

=== EPs ===
Year	Album	Peak	Track list
Year	Album	DK	Track list
2011	Det lyder radikalt – Remix EP	9	1. "Den lige vej" (Carsten Heller remix) (3:50); 2. "Jeg har ikke lyst til at dø" (Kellermensch remix) (4:51); 3. "Hvem springer du for" (Filur remix) (5:32); 4. "Aftenbøn" (Asger Baden remix) (3:34); 5. "Morten" (Simon Kvamm remix) (5:32); 6. "De gode gamle dumme unge" (DJ Static & Temu remix) (5:47); 7. "Alle har en fortid" (Árni Bergmann remix) (5:09)

=== Singles ===
Year	Song	Peak	Certification	Album
Year	Song	DK	Certification	Album
2010	"Morten"	9	Gold (download)	De eneste to
2010	"Jeg har ikke lyst til at dø"	–	Gold (download); Gold (streaming)	De eneste to
2011	"Østjylland Dreaming"	–		De eneste to
2011	"Den lige vej" (Carsten Heller Remix)	32		Det lyder radikalt – Remix EP
2014	"Sult"	17		Dobbeltliv
2014	"Skrig det til træerne"	25		Dobbeltliv
