= Drengene fra Angora =

Danish television satirical comedy series

Drengene fra Angora (English: The Boys from Angora) is a Danish television satirical comedy series. First airing in 2004, it has acquired cult status in its native Denmark. Among its more popular sketches are Team Easy On, Landmandssønnerne og far, and Spændende mennesker.

The actors were Esben Pretzmann, Rune Tolsgaard and Simon Kvamm.

In 2004 the group made the hit song "Jul i Angora".
