= USADSB =

Studio album by Nephew
- Released: 30 June 2004
- Studios: Combi Sound (Århus, Denmark)
- Genre: Rock
- Length: 45.15
- Label: Copenhagen Records
- Producer: Carsten Heller

Nephew chronology
Swimming Time (2000)	USADSB (2004)	Interkom Kom Ind (2006)

Singles from USADSB
- 1. "Movie Klip"; 2. "En Wannabe Darth Vader"; 3. "Superliga"; 4. "Worst/Best Case Scenario"

Professional ratings
Review scores
Source	Rating
Gaffa	4/6 stars

USADSB is the second studio album by Danish rock band Nephew. It was released on 30 June 2004 through Copenhagen Records. After less than a month, on July 24, sales of USADSB had reached 20,000 copies.

The title is a combination of United States (United States of America) and DSB (Danske Statsbaner — Danish State Railways), mirroring the lyrical content's mix of Danish and English.

== Track listing ==
All music written by Nephew. All lyrics written by Simon Kvamm.

No.	Title	Length
1.	"Movie Klip"	5:03
2.	"Superliga"	3:42
3.	"Blå & Black" (Blue & Black)	3:29
4.	"Milk & Wine"	4:17
5.	"Dårlig Træning" (Bad Training)	5:19
6.	"En Wannabe Darth Vader"	4:20
7.	"Worst/Best Case Scenario"	4:26
8.	"Ordenspoliti" (Order Police)	4:47
9.	"USA DSB"	3:50
10.	"Bazooka"	5:59

== Personnel ==
=== Nephew ===
- Simon Kvamm – lyrics, vocals, keyboards
- Kristian Riis – guitars
- Kasper Toustrup – bass
- Søren Arnholt – drums, backing vocals

=== Additional musicians ===
- Henriette Sennenvaldt – vocals on track 3
- Stefan Kvamm – violin on track 5
- René Munk Thalund – keyboards on track 7
- Tore Hougaard Dencker – bassoon on track 8
- Hans Christian Erbs – trumpet on track 8

=== Technical ===
- Carsten Heller – producer, mixing, technician, mastering

=== Artwork ===
- Spild Af Tid – cover, artwork
- Robin Skjoldborg – photography

== Charts ==
Chart (2004)	Peak position
Danish Albums (Hitlisten)	1
