= Marie Key =

Danish singer

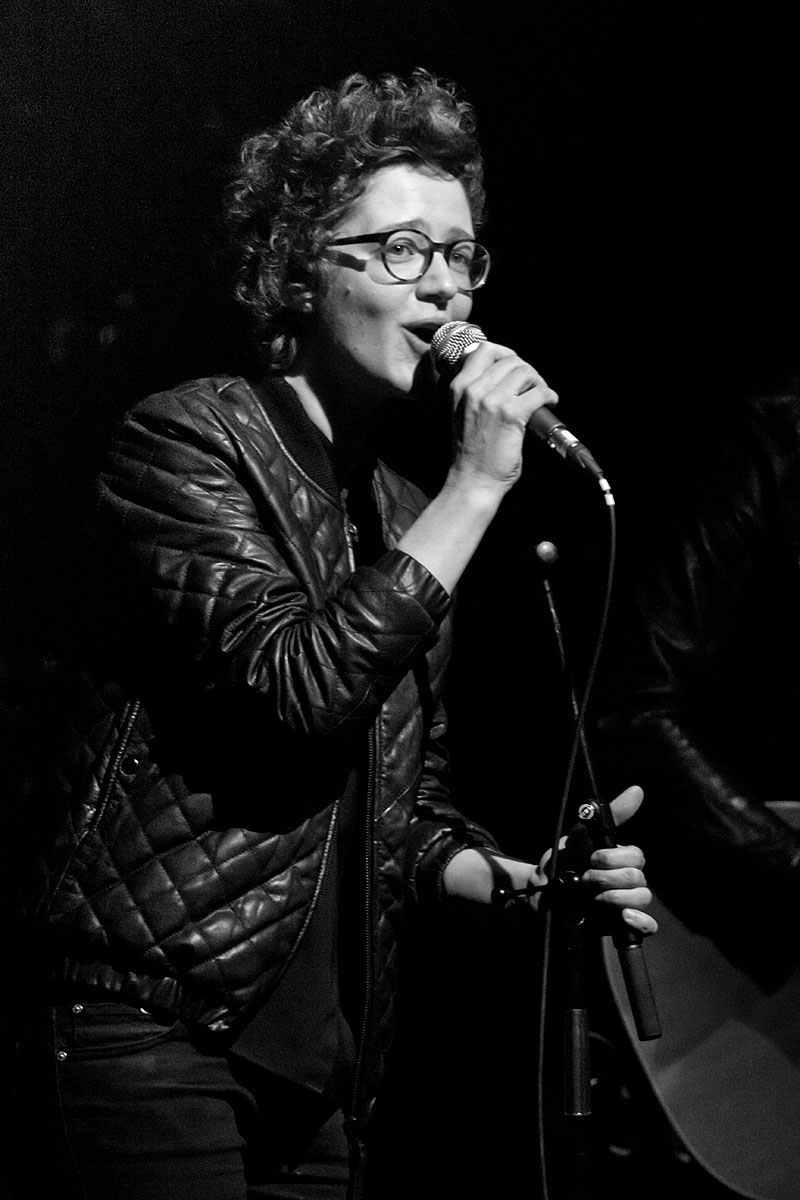
- Photo: Kim Matthäi Leland

Background information
- Also known as: Marie Key
- Born: Marie Key Kristiansen; 7 October 1979 (age 46); Denmark
- Genres: Pop
- Occupations: Singer, songwriter
- Instruments: Vocals, guitar
- Years active: 2002 – present
- Label: Sony Music
- Past members: Marie Key Band: Marie Key; Jakob Thorkild; Marie Louise von Bülow; Mads Andersen
- Website: www.mariekey.dk

Marie Key Kristiansen better known as Marie Key is a Danish pop singer and songwriter. Marie released a successful debut single "Se nu herhen" ('Look over here') taken from her debut album I byen igen ('In the town again'). With her second solo album De her dage ('These days'), Marie became an even bigger commercial success, reaching No. 1 on the Danish Album Charts.

Since 2002, Marie has worked with a number of musicians, firstly with her band called the Marie Key Band. Based in Copenhagen, the band included Marie Key (lead vocals, guitar and songwriter), Jakob Thorkild (guitar), Marie Louise von Bülow (double bass and backing vocals) and Mads Andersen (drummer and backing vocals). Their genre was considered 'urban pop' and their biggest hit was "Per" and "Kleptoman".

== Discography ==
=== Albums ===
as Marie Key Band

- 2006: Udtales ['kæj]
- 2008: EP
- 2008: Hver sin vej

Solo

Year	Album	Charts	Certification
Year	Album	DEN	Certification
2011	I byen igen	23	Platinum
2012	De her dage	1	4× Platinum
2015	Tænker du vi danser	1	Platinum
2018	Giganter	9	
2022	Lys Finale	38	

=== Singles ===
Year	Single	Charts	Certification	Album
Year	Single	DEN	Certification	Album
2012	"Se nu herhen"	16		I byen igen
2012	"Uopnåelig"	4		De her dage
2012	"Langt ude"	36		Non-album release
2013	"Uden forsvar"	3	DEN: 3xPlatin	De her dage
2013	"Landet"	23		De her dage
2015	"Fatter det nu"	19		

Featured in

Year	Single	Charts	Certification	Album
Year	Single	DEN	Certification	Album
2013	"Gå med dig" (Nephew feat. Marie Key)	1	DEN: Gold	Nephew album Hjertestarter
