= Interkom Kom Ind =

Studio album by Nephew
- Released: 6 October 2006
- Studio: Puk Recording Studios
- Genre: Rock
- Length: 47.12
- Label: Copenhagen Records
- Producer: Carsten Heller

Nephew chronology
| USADSB (2004) | Interkom Kom Ind (2006) | 07.07.07 (2007) |

Singles from Interkom Kom Ind
- 1. "Igen & Igen &"; 2. "Science Fiction & Familien"; 3. "Mexico Ligger i Spanien"

Professional ratings
Review scores
| Source | Rating |
|---|---|
| Gaffa | 5/6 stars |

Interkom Kom Ind is the third studio album by the Danish rock band Nephew. It was released on 6 October 2006 through Copenhagen Records.

== Track listing ==
All music written by Nephew. All lyrics written by Simon Kvamm.

| No. | Title | Length |
|---|---|---|
| 1. | "Igen & Igen &" (Again & Again &) | 4:35 |
| 2. | "Mexico Ligger i Spanien" (Mexico Is In Spain) | 4:53 |
| 3. | "Cigaret Kid" | 4:19 |
| 4. | "Taxa Triumf" | 4:25 |
| 5. | "Science Fiction & Familien" | 4:01 |
| 6. | "Hvidt på Sort" (White on Black) | 4:41 |
| 7. | "Hospital" | 3:39 |
| 8. | "Læsterlige Klø" (Heavy Beating) | 3:53 |
| 9. | "First Blood Harddisk" | 5:14 |
| 10. | "Sway" | 3:16 |
| 11. | "T-kryds" (T Junction) | 4:21 |

== Personnel ==
=== Nephew ===
- Simon Kvamm – lyrics, vocals, keyboards
- Kristian Riis – guitars
- Kasper Toustrup – bass
- René Munk Thalund – keyboards
- Søren Arnholt – drums, backing vocals

=== Technical ===
- Carsten Heller – producer, mixing
- Jakob Meinert Folke – technician
- Jan Eliasson – mastering

=== Artwork ===
- Esben Sködt Niklasson – art director, design

== Charts ==
| Chart (2006) | Peak position |
|---|---|
| Danish Albums (Hitlisten) | 1 |
