= Swimming Time =

Studio album by Nephew
- Released: 3 May 2000 re-released 14 February 2005
- Recorded: Jailhouse, Horsens, Denmark
- Genre: Rock
- Length: 49.46
- Label: Martian Records re-released by Copenhagen Records
- Producer: Tommy Hansen

Nephew chronology
Swimming Time (2000)	USADSB (2004)

Singles from Swimming Time
- 1. "We Don't Need You Here" Released: March 2000

Swimming Time is the debut album by the Danish rock band Nephew. Released in 2000, the album wasn't an immediate success, but upon being re-released in 2005 it sold relatively well.

== Track listing ==
All tracks are written by Simon Kvamm, except where noted.

No.	Title	Length
1.	"Stay Inside"	4:09
2.	"We Don't Need You Here"	3:40
3.	"Wasted"	4:50
4.	"Sexy Rescue"	4:52
5.	"Carslberg Nights"	3:49
6.	"Downtown Europe"	3:11
7.	"100 Years"	4:36
8.	"Oyster Hall"	4:32
9.	"Bedtime Now"	4:03
10.	"Speed Nation"	3:56
11.	"Circulating Slow" (Co-written with drummer Søren Arnholt)	4:04
12.	"Swimming Time"	6:03

== Charts ==
Chart (2005)	Peak position
Danish Albums (Hitlisten)	15
