= Dodo and the Dodos =

Danish pop band

Dodo And The Dodos
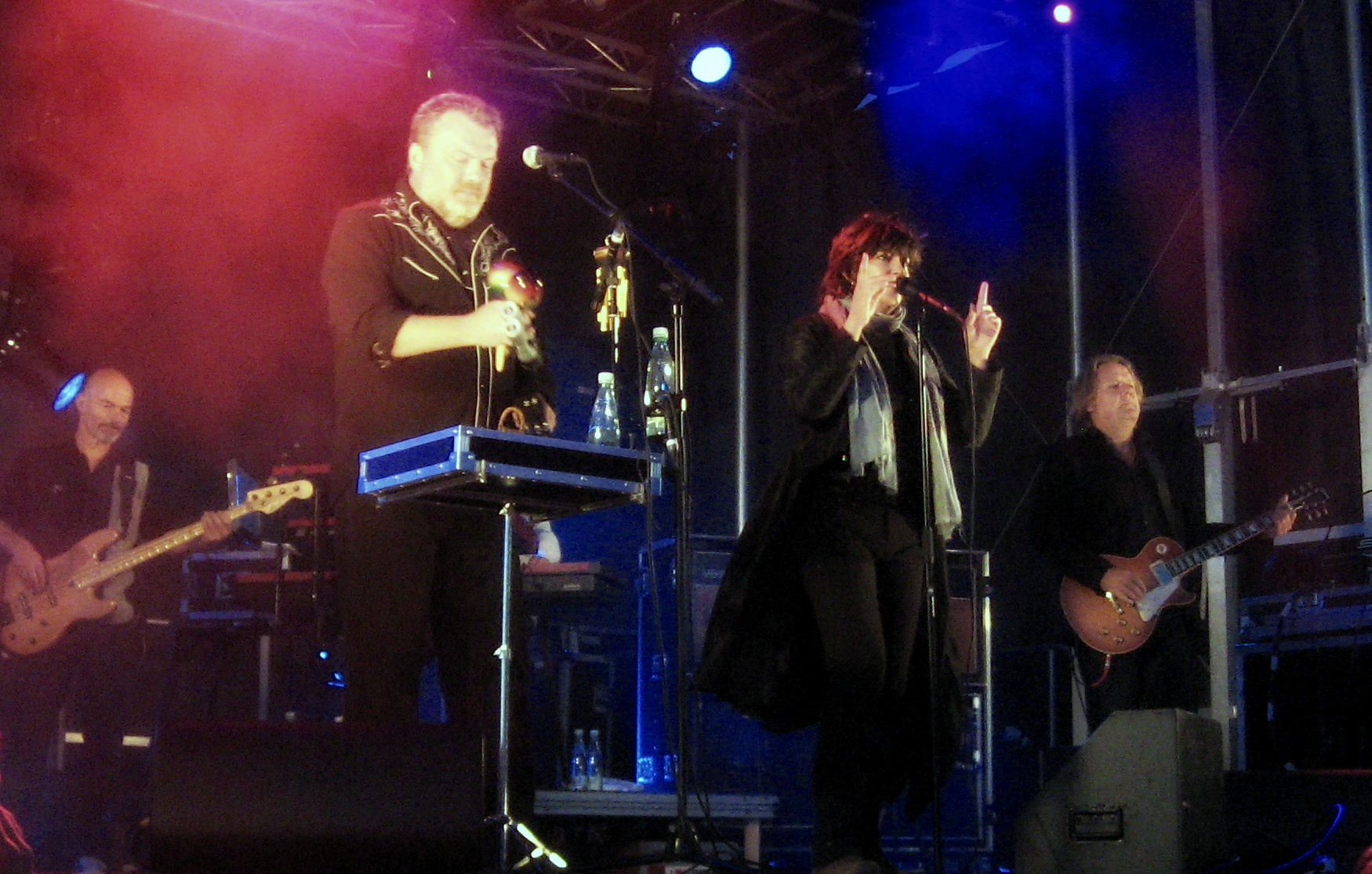
- Concert in Hirtshals, 2012

Background information
- Years active: 1986-
- Labels: Pink River Music
- Members: Dodo Gad; Jens Rud; Steen Christiansen; Lars Thorup; Anders Valbro
- Website: www.dodos.dk

Dodo and the Dodos is a Danish pop band that became a hit with Danish radio stations in the 1980s with its songs "Vågner i natten" ("awaking in the night"), "Sømand af verden" ("Sailor of the world"), "Vi gør det vi ka' li" ("We do what we like"), "Lev livet nu" ("Live life now"), and "Pigen med det røde hår" ("The girl with the red hair"). "Lev livet nu" was used by TV 2 Sport during the coverage of the 1992 Summer Olympics.

The lead singer, Dodo Gad, also recorded the football (soccer) song "Re-Sepp-Ten" for the 1986 FIFA World Cup; with Steen Christiansen as producer and studio musician, Jens Rud as studio technician, and Anders Valbro. Twelve years later, Dodo again recorded a song for the finals ("Vi vil ha' sejren i land" or "We want the victory hauled in"), which was not as great of a success but has nevertheless become a classic in Denmark. In 2009, Dodo and the Dodos created a rally song called "Ren Fysik & Kærlighed" ("Pure Physics and Love") for the L2009 tournament which was held in Holbæk.

Dodo and the Dodos have released six albums, the last of which was in 2008. The band is still a popular live band, and often plays at festivals and outdoor concerts throughout Denmark. The band has sold over 1.5 million albums, and is thus one of the best-selling Danish groups to date.

== Members ==
- Dodo Gad: vocals
- Jens Rud: vocals, guitar
- Steen Christiansen: guitar, keyboards (died 29 October 2019)
- Lars Thorup: drums, percussion
- Anders Valbro: guitar

== Discography ==
=== Albums ===
- 1987: Dodo & The Dodos (album)
- 1988: Dodo & The Dodos 2
- 1989: Dodo & The Dodos, engelsksproget album ("Dodo & The Dodos, English-language album")
- 1990: Dodo & The Dodos 3
- 1992: Dodo & The Dodos 4
- 1998: Dodos 5
- 2008: Dodos 6

=== Compilations ===
- 1995: Største Hits ("Biggest Hits")
- 2006: Hits
- 2009: Live vol. 1
