= Polarkreis 18 =

German rock ensemble

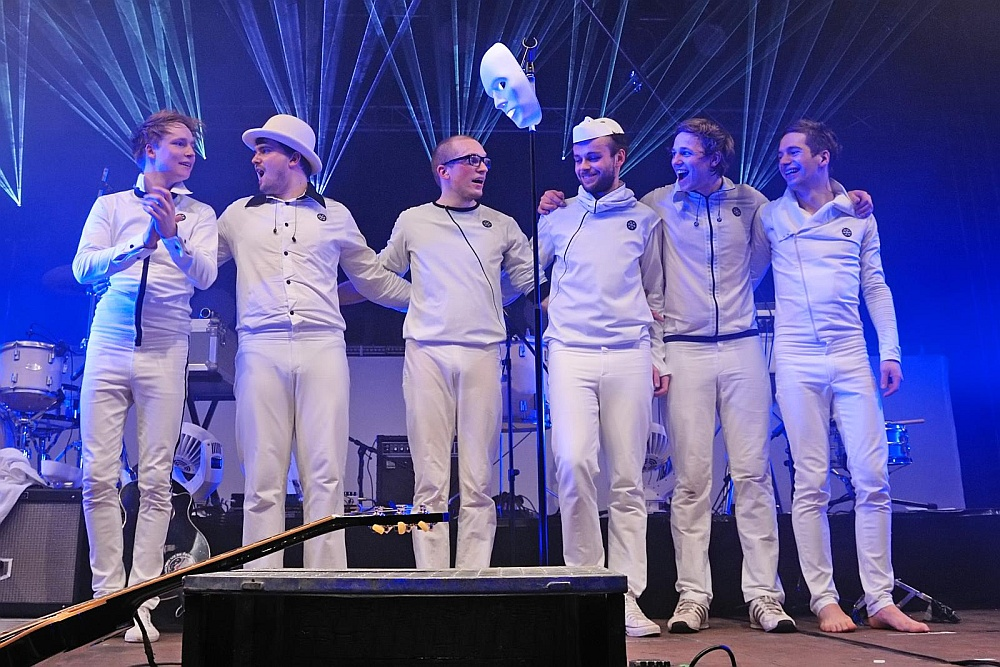
- Concert Huxley's Neue Welt in Berlin 6 March 2009

Background information
- Also known as: Jack of All Trades
- Origin: Dresden, Saxony, Germany
- Genres: Alternative rock, synth-pop, pop rock, post-rock, indietronica
- Years active: 1998–2012
- Label: Universal Germany
- Members: Felix Räuber; Christian Grochau; Ludwig Bauer; Philipp Makolies; Uwe Pasora; Silvester Wenzel (1998-2011)
- Website: www.polarkreis18.de

Polarkreis 18 was a German rock band from Dresden, Saxony. The bandmembers met at school, where they formed the Jack of all Trades ensemble in 1998. In 2004, they renamed their band Polarkreis 18. Its musical style can be described as rock, synth-pop and indietronica. Their albums include Polarkreis 18 and more recently The Colour of Snow. Their single "Allein, Allein" (Alone Alone) reached the number one position on the German Media Control Top100 Singles chart from 31 October 2008 to 4 December 2008 for 5 consecutive weeks and another 8 weeks on position number 2. It is one of the most successful singles in that country of all time. It has also been in the top ten of several other countries throughout Europe. It also made the number 1 position for 5 consecutive weeks in Denmark with a remake version of the Danish band Nephew. The band consisted of: Felix Räuber, Silvester Wenzel, Uwe Pasora, Philip Makolies, Christian Grochau and Ludwig Bauer.

== Discography ==
=== Albums ===
| Year | Title | Peak chart positions | | |
| Year | Title | DE | AT | CH |
|---|---|---|---|---|
| 2007 | Polarkreis 18 | 96 | - | - |
| 2008 | The Colour of Snow | 14 | - | 62 |
| 2010 | Frei | 73 | - | - |

=== Singles ===
| Year | Title | Peak chart positions | | | | | | | | | | Album |
| Year | Title | US | DE | AT | CH | DK | LU | BE | NL | EU | ISR | Album |
|---|---|---|---|---|---|---|---|---|---|---|---|---|
| 2008 | Allein, Allein^{1, 2} | – | 1 | 2 | 7 | 1 | 1 | 5 | 61 | 11 | 2 | The Colour of Snow |
| 2009 | The Colour of Snow | – | 5 | 38 | – | – | – | – | – | 34 | – | The Colour of Snow |
| 2009 | Happy Go Lucky | – | 72 | – | – | – | – | – | – | – | – | The Colour of Snow |
| 2010 | Unendliche Sinfonie | – | 32 | – | – | – | – | – | – | – | – | Frei |
| 2012 | Allein | 12 | – | – | – | – | – | – | – | – | – | Eric Prydz Remix |

1 In Denmark, the Danish band Nephew remixed the song, it was called "Allein, Alene" (respectively German and Danish for alone).

2 in Germany, the song was the 13th best-selling of 2008 and the 15th best-selling single of 2009. In the decade 2000–2009, it was even more successful, making it the fifth best-selling song of that decade.
