= Hjertestarter =

Studio album by Nephew
- Released: 2 November 2012
- Genre: Rock
- Length: 47:16
- Label: Copenhagen Records
- Producer: Carsten Heller

Nephew chronology
Danmark/Denmark (2009)	Hjertestarter (2012)	Ring—i—Ring (2018)

Singles from Hjertestarter
- 1. "Hjertestarter"; 2. "Klokken 25"; 3. "Gå med dig" 4. "Søndagsbange"

Hjertestarter is the fifth studio album by the Danish rock band Nephew. It was released on 2 November 2012 through Copenhagen Records. The album received Platinum in December of the same year.

In 2013 a duet between Nephew and Marie Key was released; a remake of the song "Gå med dig"

== Track listing ==
All music written by Nephew. All lyrics written by Simon Kvamm.

No.	Title	Length
1.	"Hjertestarter" (Defibrillator)	4:43
2.	"Klokken 25" (25 O'Clock)	4:03
3.	"Alt er hårdt" (Everything Is Hard)	4:37
4.	"Åh Gud (Jeg håber du holder øje med mig)" (Oh God (I Hope You're Watching Over Me))	5:53
5.	"Tak du" (Thank You)	4:35
6.	"Gå med dig" (Go With You)	4:32
7.	"De satans hæmninger" (Fucking Inhibitions)	5:32
8.	"Søndagsbange" (Sunday Scared)	4:20
9.	"Alt er synd" (Everything Is Too Bad)	5:44
10.	"Fem rum" (Five Rooms)	5:17

== Charts ==
Chart (2012)	Peak position
Danish Albums (Hitlisten)	1
