= Mofus =

Danish rock/electronica band

Mofus is a Danish rock/electronica band. They live in Århus, eastern Jutland, Denmark. Mofus' lead singer is Anders Bech. Mofus' first album was called Trouble on the Moon, which includes the single "Sex In Space".

Mofus's second album is called The Possible/Impossible, a double album comprising the "physically possible" rock CD Possible, and the "physically impossible" electronic CD Impossible. The album has received 4 out of 6 stars in the Danish music magazine Gaffa.
