= Danmark/Denmark =

Studio album by Nephew
- Released: 5 June 2009
- Genre: Rock
- Length: 50:24
- Label: Copenhagen Records
- Producer: Carsten Heller

Nephew chronology
Roskilde 07.07.07 (2007)	Danmark/Denmark (2009)	Hjertestarter (2012)

Singles from Danmark/Denmark
- 1. "007 Is Also Gonna Die"; 2. "Va Fangool!"; 3. "Police Bells and Church Sirens"

Danmark/Denmark is the fourth studio album from the Danish rock band Nephew. It was released on 5 June 2009 (the Danish constitution day or "Grundlovsdag") through Copenhagen Records.

== Publicity ==
"007 Is Also Gonna Die", was chosen by the Danish radio channel P3 to be The voice Uundgåelige (P3's Unavoidable) in week 16, 2009, meaning that the song will be played at least once every two hours for an entire week.

== Track listing ==
All tracks are written by Nephew, except where noted

No.	Title	Length
1.	"D.T.A.P."	3:30
2.	"007 Is Also Gonna Die"	4:31
3.	"Police Bells and Church Sirens"	5:11
4.	"Sov For Satan Mand"	3:36
5.	"Danmark Man Dark"	2:43
6.	"Gong Gong"	3:27
7.	"Det Her Sker Bare Ikk'"	4:45
8.	"Va Fangool!"	3:46
9.	"Descendants Of King Canute"	4:11
10.	"Focus On The Sound"	4:49
11.	"New Year's Morning" (Lyrics consist of excerpts from four stanzas in 'Nyaars-Morgen' (1824; da. 'New Year's Morning') by N. F. S. Grundtvig. Translated into English in 2009 by K. Shultz Petersen.)	4:15
12.	"Hurra"	6:03

== Charts ==
Chart (2009)	Peak position
Danish Albums (Hitlisten)	1
