= Roskilde 07.07.07 =

Live album by Nephew
- Released: 7 November 2007
- Recorded: 7 July 2007
- Genre: Rock
- Length: 77:31
- Label: Copenhagen Records
- Producer: Theis Molin

Nephew chronology
Interkom Kom Ind (2006)	Roskilde 07.07.07 (2007)	Danmark/Denmark (2009)

Roskilde 07.07.07 is the second live album by the Danish rock band Nephew.

== Track listing ==
1. "Bazooka" – 9:33
2. "Science Fiction Og Familien" – 4:53
3. "Superliga" – 3:48
4. "First Blood Harddisk" – 5:26
5. "Blå & Black" – 3:49
6. "Movieclip" – 4:49
7. "USA DSB" – 4:06
8. "T-Kryds" – 6:55
9. "Igen & Igen &" – 5:54
10. "Mexico Ligger I Spanien" – 5:12
11. "Worst/Best Case Scenario" – 8:13
12. "Hospital feat. L.O.C." – 5:25
13. "En Wannabe Darth Vader" – 6:10
14. "The Way I Are Nephew Remix" – 3:48

== Charts ==
Chart (2007)	Peak position
Danish Albums (Hitlisten)	2

== Certifications ==
During 2023, the album was certified 4× platinum in Denmark.
