= Nephew (band) =

Danish rock band

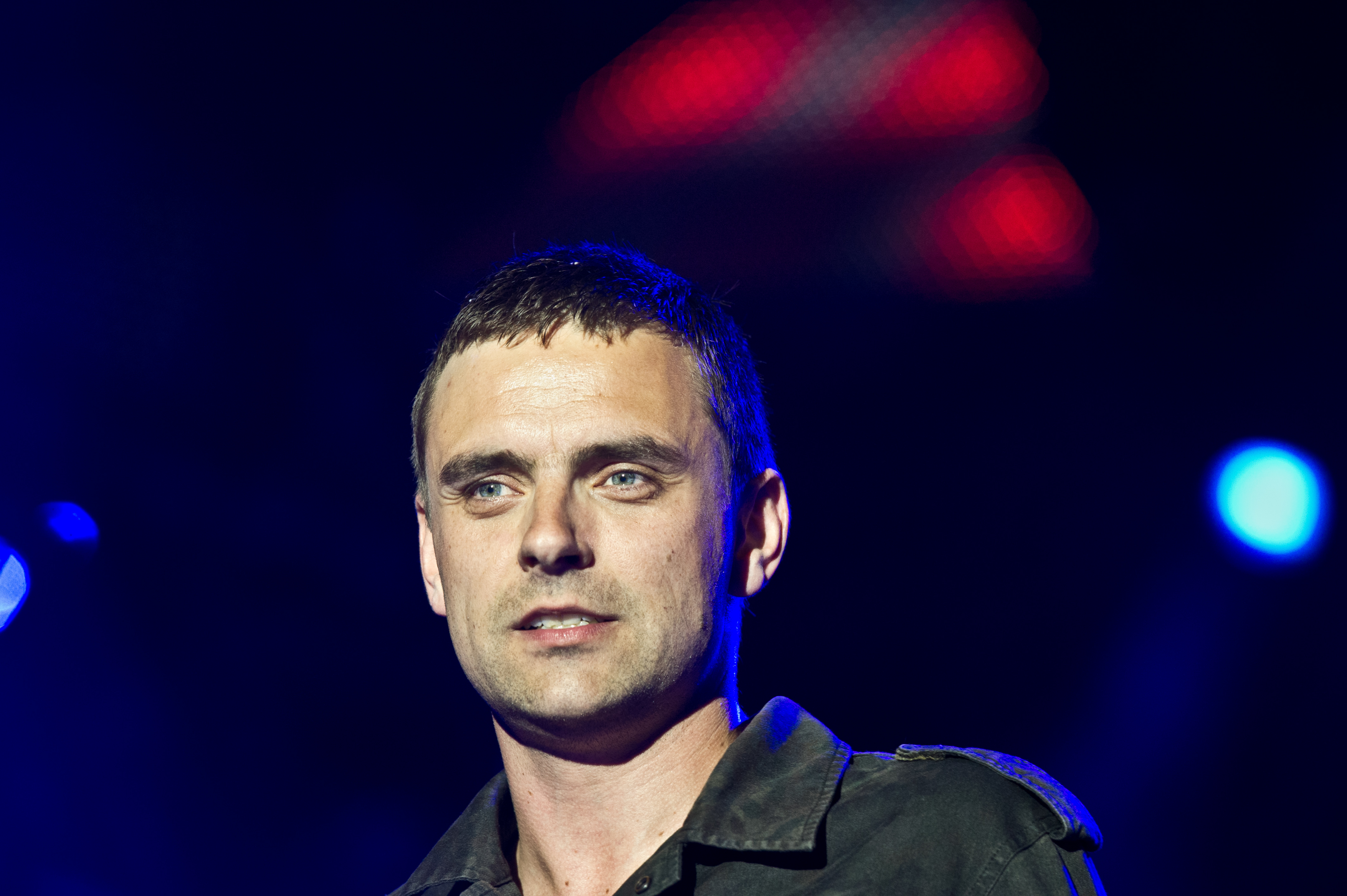
- Simon Kvamm at Roskilde Festival 2010.

Background information
- Origin: Aarhus, Denmark
- Genres: Rock; Synthpop; New wave
- Years active: 1996–2014, 2018-2019
- Labels: Martian; Copenhagen
- Members: Simon Kvamm; Kristian Riis; Søren Arnholt; Kasper Toustrup; René Munk Thalund; Marie Højlund
- Past members: Jonas Juul Jeppesen
- Website: nephew.dk

Nephew was a Danish rock band formed in 1996 in Aarhus, Denmark. The band consisted of Simon Kvamm (lead vocals, keyboards, songwriting), Kristian Riis (guitar, backing vocals), Søren Arnholt (drums, backing vocals), Kasper Toustrup (bass guitar), René Munk Thalund (keyboards), and Marie Højlund (vocals, keyboards, guitar).

The band used a mixture of Danish and English in their lyrics; most of the band's early songs were in English with minimal Danish lyrics, but the band has since moved to primarily Danish vocals. In 2009, when interviewed about the band's mixture of languages, frontman Simon Kvamm said: "It's important for me to use the Danish kind of English that I speak...my mother tongue Danish, and my second language English, are very present to me in thinking and talking and speaking with others, and writing. Also in songwriting. And things just take form in one of those languages, or a mixture in between them. I can't really find a system to what goes the English way and what goes the Danish."

As of 2013, Nephew has sold over 400,000 copies of their albums.

== History ==
=== Early days and Swimming Time (1996–2004) ===
The band was formed in 1996 by Simon Kvamm, Kristian Riis, Jonas Juul Jeppesen, and Søren Arnholt, all of whom were studying musicology at the university of Aarhus. In 1997 they participated in DM i Rock (Danish Championships in Rock), where they reached the semi-finals but did not win. In 1998 Nephew released two early demo albums, Tunes and Things to Do. After the release of these, they got some airtime on the Danish radio station P3. In 1998, Jonas Juul Jeppesen, who was until then the bassist in the band, left and was replaced by the current bassist Kasper Toustrup.

The band's first studio album, Swimming Time, was released on 3 May 2000, on the small label Martian Records. The band's gig calendar became busier than it already was, and the band performed both on Camp Stage at Roskilde Festival and several venues in Germany. In spite of the band's success, the band members lost their enthusiasm and decided to disband in 2001, but during their farewell concert in Germany, they rediscovered their passion for music and decided to stay together. Swimming Time was re-released in 2005, peaking at #15 on the charts.

=== USADSB and breakthrough (2004–2006) ===
Nephew's second studio album, named USADSB, was released 30 June 2004. The name comes from the abbreviation for the United States of America, and the abbreviation for the Danske Statsbaner. USADSB sold far more copies than Swimming Time, and was certified double platinum in Denmark and spawned four singles. It peaked at #1 and held that position for 7 weeks. It was very well received and is seen as their "breakthrough" album in Denmark and elsewhere. While the success of the album was propelled by Simon Kvamm's participation in the Danish satire show Drengene Fra Angora, the album's first single Movie Klip became a radio hit in December 2003 well before the premiere of the show. One of the other singles from USADSB, "En Wannabe Darth Vader", topped the Danish singles chart. Aside from Denmark, USADSB has been released in Japan, Germany, and Norway.

In 2005, René Munk Thalund officially joined Nephew as keyboardist after having toured with the band since April 2004. He had previously been in the electronic trio Shanks.dk with Nephew's producer, Carsten Heller, and Jesper Birk. With the addition of Thalund, Nephew proceeded to make the song "Byens Hotel" for Værsgo 2, the 2005 Danish tribute album to Kim Larsen's 1973 album Værsgo. Sometime in 2005, a mix of Nephew's "Movie Klip" and Depeche Mode's "Personal Jesus" appeared. It was later revealed that the mix was made by René Munk Thalund.

=== Interkom Kom Ind (2006–2008) ===
On 6 October 2006, Nephew released their third studio album, Interkom Kom Ind. It was received well by critics and fans alike, and was certified 3× platinum in Denmark. The singles, "Igen & Igen &", "Science Fiction & Familien", and "Mexico Ligger i Spanien" rotated heavily on Danish radio. It topped the charts for 3 weeks. The Mexico Ligger i Spanien Remix EP was released later in 2007, which contains remixes by Mofus and Klovn of the song "Mexico Ligger i Spanien", as well as both an extended mix and a short intro version of the song.

At the 2006 MTV Europe Music Awards, the band met Timbaland, who wanted them to work on his forthcoming Timbaland Presents Shock Value album. Due to other commitments, Nephew couldn't contribute to the album, but they did produce a remix of the song "The Way I Are". Nephew frontman Simon Kvamm delivered new vocals for the song, which were included on the single release. The remix sampled the melody from "Igen & Igen &", as well as translated-to-English lyrics from the song which were then incorporated throughout the remix. It was released in most of Europe as a B-side to the original single, but in Scandinavia, was played often as the main single.

On 5 November 2007, Nephew released a live performance box-set (Live-CD/2DVD) entitled Roskilde 07.07.07 based upon a much-acclaimed live performance at Orange Scene at the 2007 Roskilde Festival. The Live CD features songs from the albums USADSB and Interkom Kom Ind, including a special version of "Hospital" which features a guest performance by Danish rapper L.O.C. The Special Edition of the box also includes the band's remix of the Timbaland track "The Way I Are". The album peaked at #2 for 1 week.

In September 2008, a Nephew remix of the song "Allein Allein" by German band Polarkreis 18, entitled "Allein Alene", began to play on the Danish radio. It was mixed by the keyboardist of the band, René Munk Thalund, and Carsten Heller, who both mixes and produces for Nephew. It topped the charts for 8 weeks.

=== Danmark/Denmark (2009–2010) ===
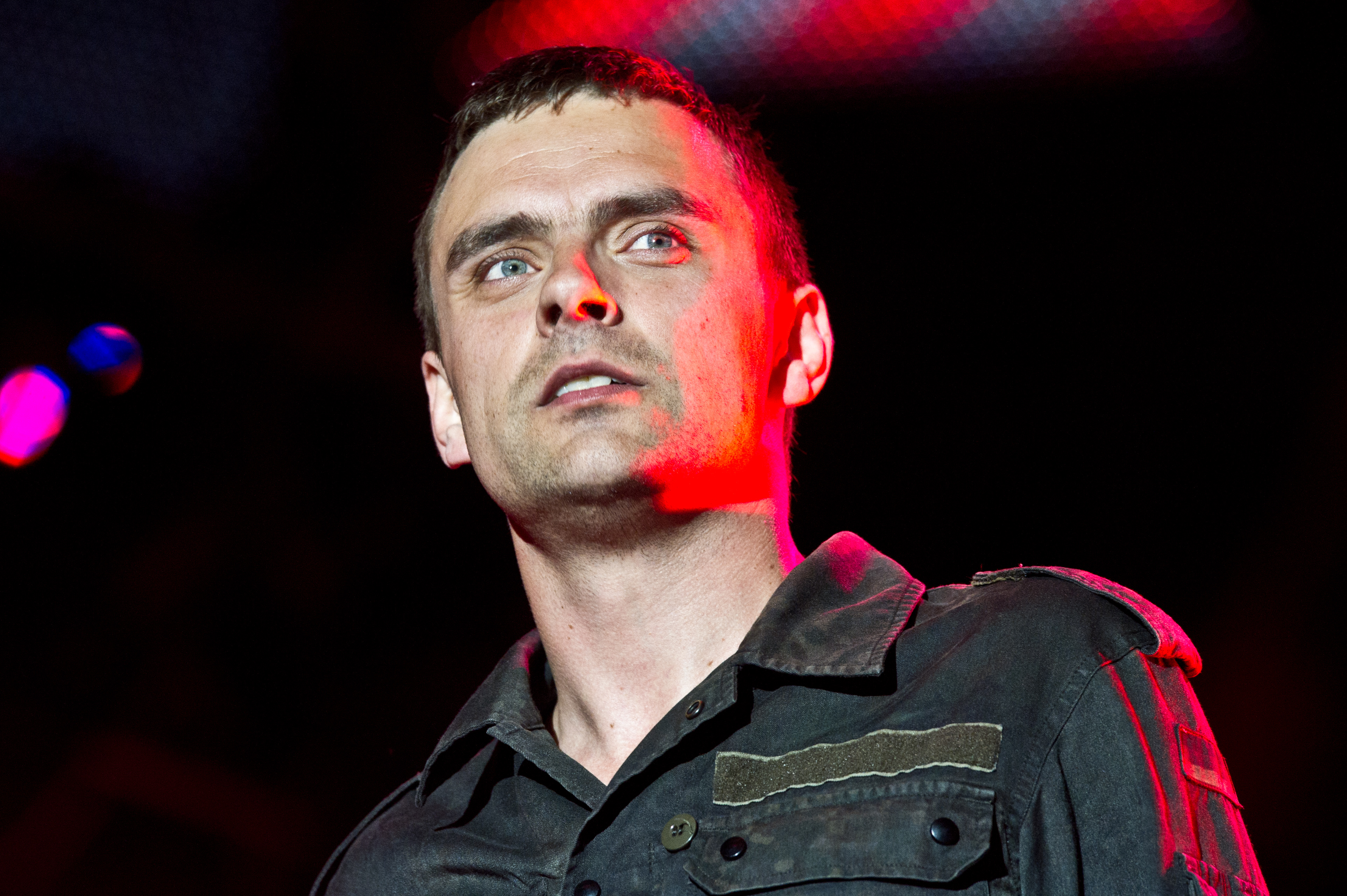
Simon Kvamm performing at Roskilde Festival 2010

Nephew released their fourth studio album, Danmark/Denmark, on 5 June 2009, the Danish Constitution Day. It peaked at #1, holding the spot for 2 weeks. Following a performance at Roskilde Festival in 2010, the band announced that they would be taking a break from touring and Denmark, although they did play shows in Norway and China. On 23 November 2011 they announced via their official website that they would be playing several concerts in July 2012 as a part of the Grøn Koncerter ("Green Concert"). They also announced in the same press release that they had begun work on Hjertestarter and expected to release it sometime in the autumn of 2012.

Nephew was also responsible for the official football song for the 2010 FIFA World Cup in South Africa: "The Danish Way to Rock", which sat at the top of the charts for 2 weeks. In addition to this, the Police Bells & Church Sirens EP was released in 2010, containing a radio edit, the "Dainty Doll's Trend Mix", and "Nephew's Nightlife Mix" (mixed by René Munk Thalund) of the song "Police Bells & Church Sirens". Furthermore, two of the band members, René Munk Thalund and Kristian Riis, did backing vocals for Kim Wilde's song "Hey! You!" on her album Come Out and Play.

=== Hjertestarter (2012) ===
Nephew's fifth studio album, Hjertestarter, was released on 2 November 2012, and dedicated to Denmark's extended night season. It went straight to the number one most sold album (in Denmark) that month and the Danish iTunes store, holding the top spot on the charts for two weeks. Nephew has performed at various events with the single "Hjertestarter" from the album; most recently the Danish Music Awards'12. When asked what this single was meant to convey, Kristian Riis said: "The album's title track is a tribute to the North Sea. The single acts to start up the heart–emotionally or literally in a revival." The third single "Gå med dig" featuring Marie Key went Gold.

=== 1-2-3-4-5 and Igen & Igen & (2013) ===
On 18 November 2013, Nephew released an album boxset, 1-2-3-4-5, as well as a collection of singles, Igen & Igen &. 1-2-3-4-5 contains Nephew's five studio albums along with 15 bonus songs; early renditions of the songs "USADSB", "Mexico Ligger i Spanien", "Hospital", "007 Is Also Gonna Die", and "Hjertestarter"; a remix of "Downtown Europe" by Ørtz/Mofus; an alternative version of "Worst/Best Case Scenario"; an early version of "Superliga"; the previously unreleased demo songs "Swedenborg" and "Marking Princess"; and premixes of the previously unreleased "Pasfotografier", "Automatisk Mig", "Stop Nu Hjælp Nu", "The Day I Laminate My Heart", and "Jeg Kan Se". It peaked at #15 and stayed there for a week. Igen & Igen & is a collection of all of Nephew's singles currently released at the time, as well as one bonus track: a cover of the song "Det Si'r Sig Selv" by C.V. Jørgensen. It sat at number eight for one week.

=== Ring-i-Ring (2018) ===
In October 2017 Nephew announced that they would return in 2018 after four years in hiatus. They announced two arena shows in Jyske Bank Boxen and Royal Arena to take place a year later. The more than 30,000 tickets for the shows sold out in less than a day. They also announced Marie Højlund as a new member of the band. While unknown to the broader public, Højlund had played in indie bands Tiger Tunes and Marybell Katastrophy and she holds a Ph.D. in sound design. Later Nephew added two exclusive festival shows to their tour, one being on Roskilde Festival's iconic Orange Stage. January 2018 saw the release of the EP Vinter-i-Ring, including the single "Amsterdam" and a re-work of the old German/Danish song Sig Månen Langsomt Hæver. The songs represents the well-known sound of Nephew with the prominent presence of Marie Højlund's vocals, keyboards and guitars. In April 2018 another EP, Forår-i-Ring, was released with a spectacular event on the rooftop of ARoS. In July 2018, the EP Sommer-i-Ring was released; and finally, in September 2018, the last EP Efterår-i-Ring was released.

Nephew's sixth studio album, Ring-i-Ring, was released on 27 September 2018. The theme of the album is the circular motions within nature and our lives.

== Band members ==
Current

- Simon Kvamm – lead vocals, keyboards, songwriting (1996–present)
- Kristian Riis – guitar, backing vocals (1996–present)
- Søren Arnholt – drums, backing vocals (1996–present)
- Kasper Toustrup – bass guitar (1998–present)
- René Munk Thalund – keyboards (2005–present)
- Marie Højlund – vocals, keyboards, guitar (2017–present)

Former

- Jonas Juul Jeppesen – bass guitar (1996–1998)

== Discography ==
=== Albums ===
- Swimming Time (2000)
- USADSB (2004)
- Interkom Kom Ind (2006)
- Danmark/Denmark (2009)
- Hjertestarter (2012)
- Ring-i-Ring (2018)

=== Compilations ===
- Igen & Igen & (2013)
- 1-2-3-4-5 (2013)

=== Live albums ===
- USADSB 10 x så live (2004)
- Roskilde 07.07.07 (2007)
- Hjertestarter 10 x så live (2013)
