= Simon Kvamm =

Danish-Faroese actor and singer (born 1975)

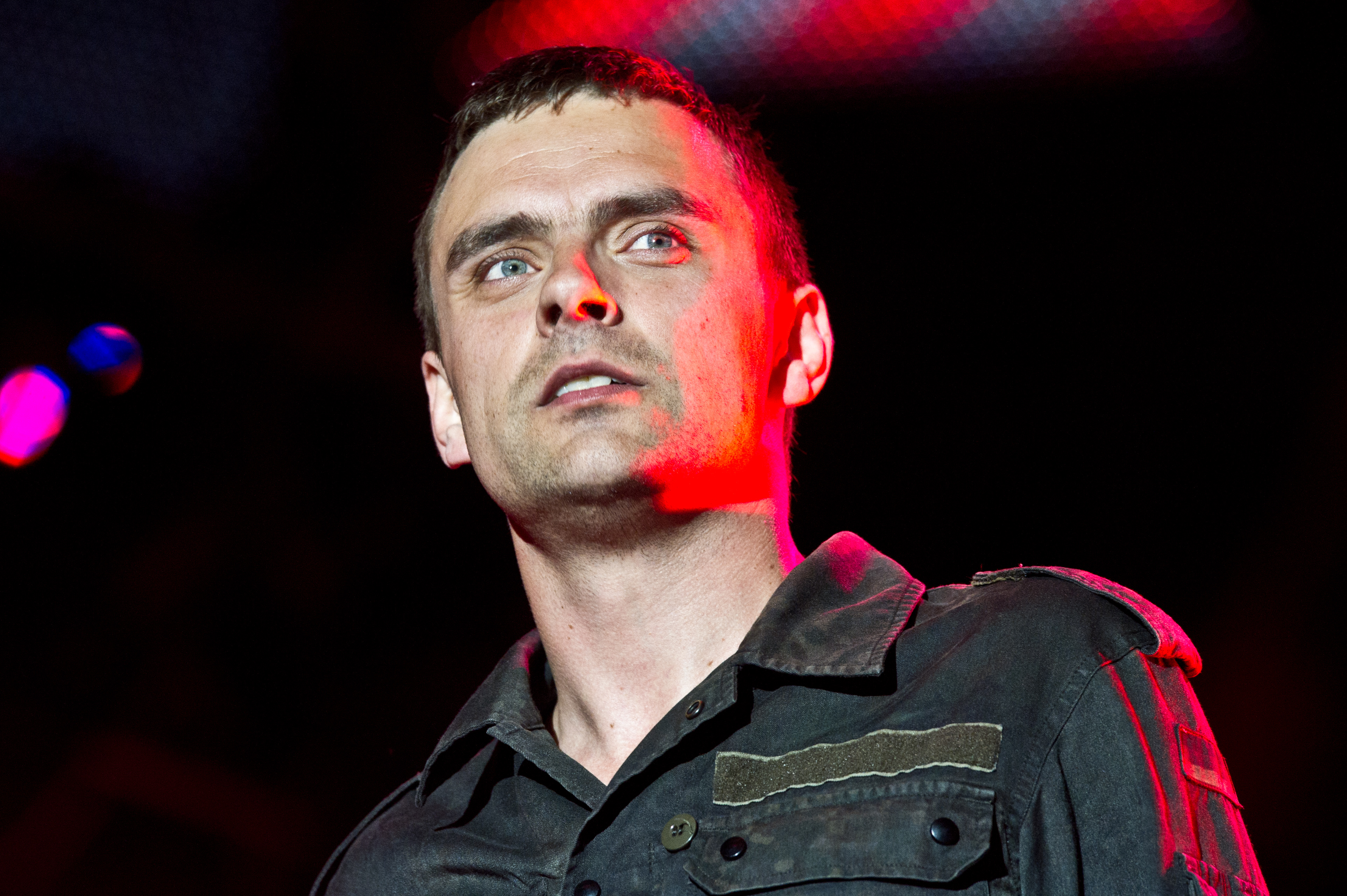
- Simon Kvamm during a Nephew concert at Roskilde Festival 2010

Background information
- Born: Simon Kvamm; 18 February 1975 (age 51); Silkeborg, Denmark
- Genre: Rock
- Occupations: Singer-songwriter; actor; comedian
- Instruments: Vocals; keyboard; guitar
- Years active: 1996–present
- Website: simonkvamm.dk

Simon Kvamm (born 18 February 1975) is a Danish actor and singer. He is best known as one of the founding members of the Danish rock band Nephew, where he sang lead vocals and played guitar and keyboards. He is also well known for his acts in the Danish comedy show Drengene fra Angora. He is also part of pop duo De Eneste To alongside Peter Sommer.

He is a currently the lead singer in the band Hugorm, which was formed in Klitmøller in 2017 in collaboration with fellow musicians Arní Bergmann and Morten Gorm. The band's first EP was released in 2020, entitled Folk skal bare holde deres kæft (People should just shut up), and later that year the album Kom vi flygter (Let's run away) was released. In October 2022, the band's second album Tro, Hug & Kærlighed (Faith, Hug & Love) was released, and on 11 October 2024, their third album, Drømmehug, was released. This precedes the band's major arena tour that year, which began on 14 November in Odense, continued on to Aarhus and Aalborg, and finally concluded at the Royal Arena in Copenhagen on 22 November. It is the band's biggest indoor tour to date.

Kvamm is one of the main creators behind the TV series Guru on DR2, in which he plays the lead role as life coach Anders Mertz. In 2021, the series was nominated for the TV Prisen award (The TV Awards), and Simon Kvamm was nominated for a Robert Award for "Best Male Lead Role" in the same year.

== Early life ==
Kvamm was born on 18 February 1975 in Silkeborg as the son of Janus and Agnes Kvamm, who are a doctor and dentist, respectively. He has a younger brother, Stefan Kvamm, who is also a musician, as well as an anthropologist.

Kvamm graduated from Silkeborg Gymnasium in 1994; it was during his time at Båring Højskole he started to see himself as a musician. He subsequently enrolled in musicology at Aarhus University, but his interest in television and radio journalism led him to train and study to become a journalist at the Danish School of Journalism in Aarhus, but he did not end up completing the training. Instead, he became employed at Danmarks Radio (now known as the Danish Broadcasting Corporation) after his internship at DR Ung, where in 2003 he participated in the fictional documentary series about the rocker club Svinene, where the character Baune was born. The character Baune carried on with Kvamm when he, along with actors Esben Pretzmann and Rune Tolsgaard, was part of Drengene fra Angora, which became a household name in 2004.

He was initially a football player, playing with the football club Silkeborg IF, who played a major role in Kvamm's childhood, until he was around 18 years old. He has been behind the club's entrance song on several occasions, which has been both a remix of Nephew's "Movie Klip" and the song "Vi Er Søhøjlandet", made in collaboration with the band More Blessings. He also played for the football club Olympia Århus København.

== Career ==
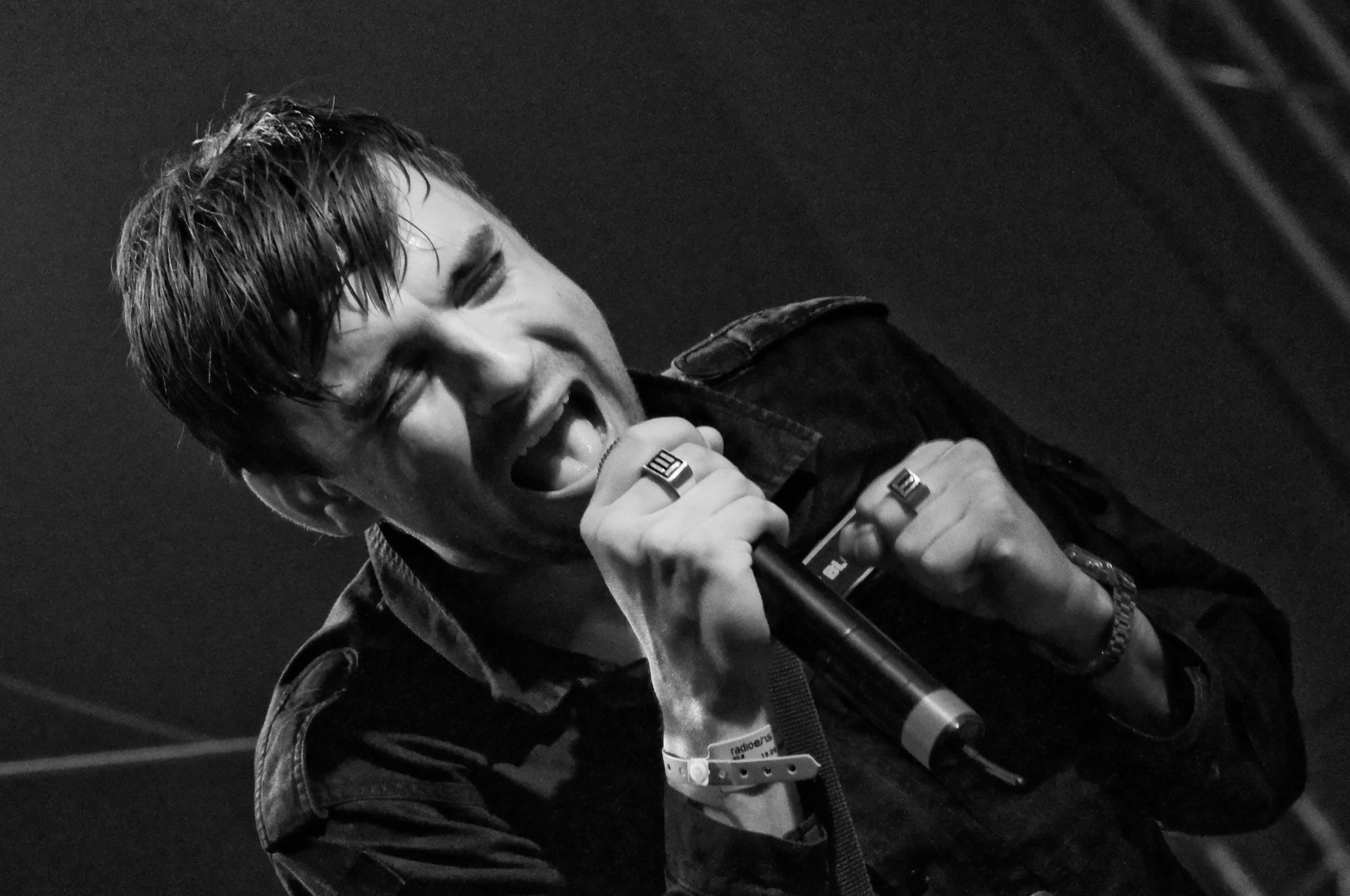
Kvamm performing with Nephew at Popkomm 2008.

Kvamm is best known as one of the founding members of the Danish rock band Nephew, where he is the lead vocalist, as well as providing guitar and keyboards. The band formed in Aarhus in 1996, and in 2000 they released their debut album, Swimming Time. Also in 2000, they played a concert at the Roskilde Festival camping stage, a concert that featured guest guitarist Hilmer Hassig.

The band had their breakthrough in 2004 with their second album USADSB, and had several hits in Denmark such as Superliga, En Wannabe Darth Vader and Movie Klip, which have won them several Danish national music awards, including 6 GAFFA awards, two of which were "Best Danish Singer" and "Best Danish Band". In 2006, the band released their third album, Interkom kom ind, and in 2007, Nephew played at Roskilde Festival's Orange Scene stage. This resulted in the DVD and live album Roskilde 07.07.07, where the title references the band's performance at the festival on that date (7 July 2007).

Nephew released their fourth album, Danmark/Denmark, in 2009, and their fifth album, Hjertestarter, was released in 2012. The band took a temporary hiatus in 2014. Three years later, in 2017, the band introduced composer Marie Højlund as a new member, and between January to September 2018, the band released songs from their sixth album Ring—i—Ring. Their song "At dø er at rejse" ("To Die is to Travel") is included in the 19th edition of the Højskolesangbogen (Folk High School Songbook). The song was originally written for Ring—i—Ring, but has been reworked and transformed into a folk high school song, with Kvamm as the lyricist. Ring—i—Ring was released on 27 October of that year.

In 2007, Kvamm hosted the travel program Antiglobetrotter on DR1. As the title suggests, Simon did not enjoy traveling, so to challenge his own comfort zone, he traveled to Uganda, Tanzania, and Kenya to meet with young African comedians, actors, and musicians. The program's theme song, Grant Lee Buffalo's “Fuzzy,” was produced by Kvamm and Carsten Heller.

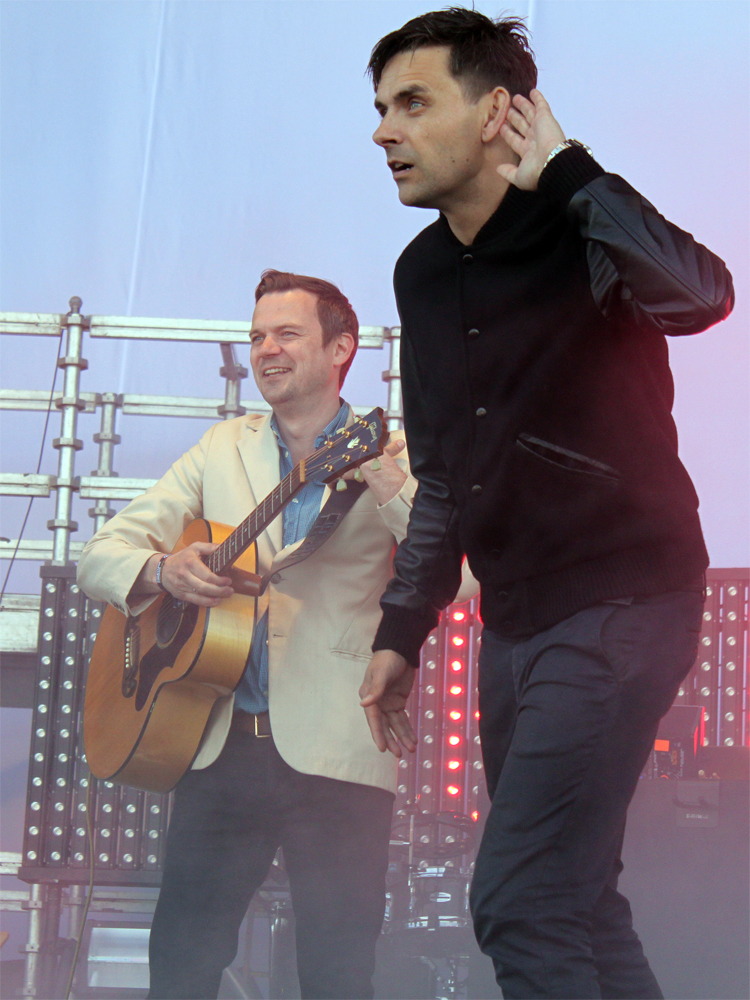
De Eneste To performing in 2015.

Kvamm is also known from the Danish comedy series Drengene fra Angora, where he plays the demented Dutch cyclist Pim de Keysersgracht, the motorcycle gang member Baune, one of the three Russians from joke hours Gagarin, and the studio host, playing as himself. Simon credits his acting with helping to develop his stage persona and create songs. He considers himself a musician first and an actor on the side. It was also in 2007 that Drengene fra Angora reappeared on screen, this time in the program Angora by Night.

In 2010, Simon formed the musical duo De Eneste To (literally The Sole Two in Danish) with his good friend, musician and colleague of many years, Peter Sommer, and their first single, “Morten,” was released on 16 August of that year. The duo's first album, self-titled De Eneste To, was released on 11 October, and had immediate success and was certified platinum in January 2011. The follow-up to the first album, Dobbeltliv, was released in 2014. The band has also released the EPs D.E.T lyder radikalt and Friday I'm In Love.

In 2016, he launched his solo career with his solo show Vandmand, which premiered in Aalborg on 16 August. The show combines several of Simon's interests and talents and is based on reflections on his own childhood and youth, as well as "being seen as a shark but feeling like a jellyfish." His move from Frederiksberg to Klitmøller provided both the courage, desire, and content for the show—the first in his own name. The single "Revner" was released on 4 October 2016, and the full album, entitled the same name as the show, was released as an appendix to the show on 27 January 2017.

In 2017, the theater concert Lyden af de skuldre vi står på – sangskatten remixet af Simon Kvamm (The Sound of the Shoulders We Stand On – Songs Remixed by Simon Kvamm) premiered at Aarhus Theater and was attended by then-Queen of Denmark Margrethe II in connection with the opening of Aarhus Festuge. Kvamm, in collaboration with Marie Højlund, interpreted and set Danish songs and hymns to music as a tribute to community and the treasure of Danish songs. The performance played to sold-out houses, received rave reviews, and won two Reumert awards for "Musical/Music Concert of the Year" and "Stage Design of the Year".

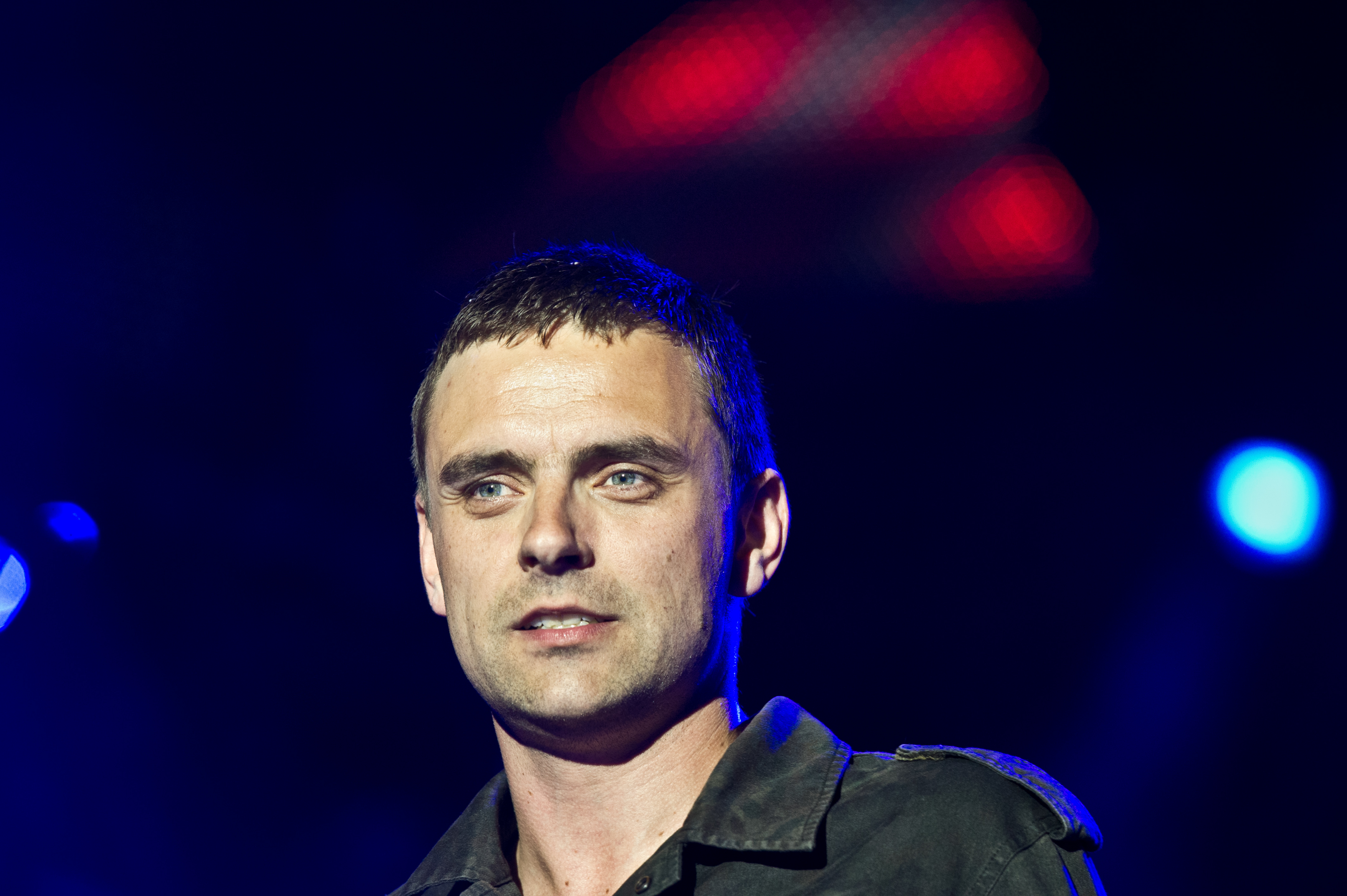
Kvamm performing with Nephew at Roskilde Festival 2010.

It was also in 2017 that Kvamm formed the band Hugorm in a garage in Klitmøller, with musicians Morten Gorm and Árni Bergmann. The band played a performance in October 2019 at the Hotel Cecil in Copenhagen before they were immediately known. On 8 January 2020, Kvamm officially announced that he had formed Hugorm, and their first EP, Folk skal bare holde deres kæft (People should just shut up), was released on 24 January 2020. The EP was followed by the album Kom vi flygter (Let's run away) on 24 October 2020, and garnered rave reviews, including 5 stars from the magazine Gaffa. In 2021, the group was nominated for two awards at the Danish Music Awards for Danish Group of the Year and New Live Act of the Year. According to the band themselves, Hugorm is "a band that's all about going wild, cleaning house, and, not least, freaking out." Kvamm himself mentions how he uses humor and aggression in the band to get even closer to something real.

On 14 October 2022, the band released their second album, titled Tro, hug og kærlighed (Faith, Love, and Affection). Notable musical collaborations include the songs "Der er sket noget" ("Something Has Happened") with Benjamin Hav and "Mig & Frank" ("Me & Frank") with Frank Hvam in connection with the DR program Make Badminton Great Again. Two years later, on 11 October 2024, Hugorm's third album Drømmehug (Dream come true) was released.

Hugorm announced a year in advance that in November 2024 they would play their biggest concerts to date on an arena tour, which, in addition to arenas in Aarhus, Aalborg, and Odense, includes the Royal Arena in Copenhagen. In connection with this, they went on tour with Frank Hvam in the fall of 2023, a show where Frank would act as coach for the band in the run-up to the big arena concerts. The show was incredibly well received by critics and played to sold-out houses across the country.

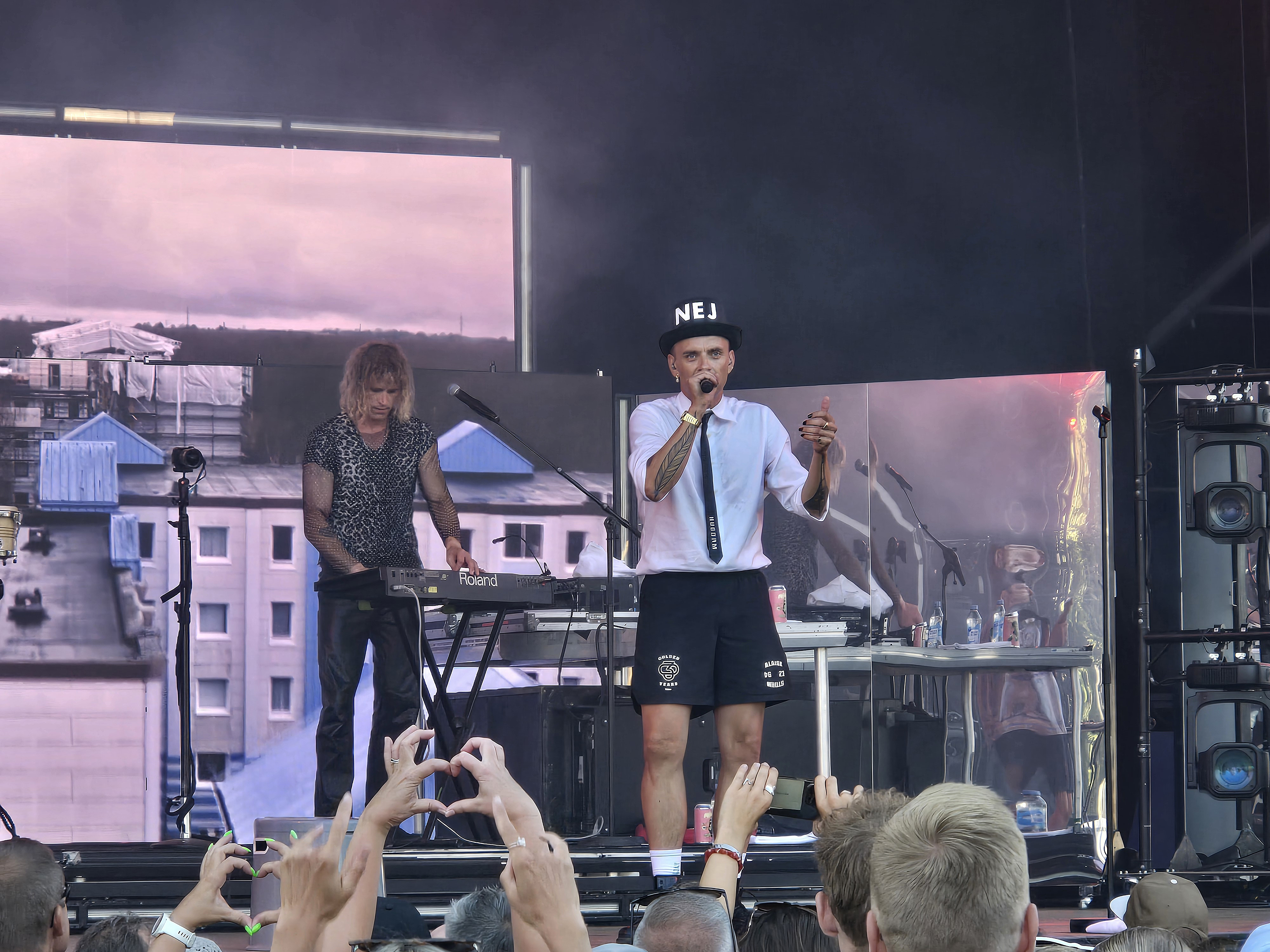
Kvamm performing with Hugorm at Skodborg ParkRock Festival 2025.

Hugorm has also provided all the music for the DR series Guru. After several years in the making, Guru premiered on DRTV on 8 April 2021. Guru is a six-part series created by Kvamm in collaboration with Svend Brinkmann and Stine Ellerbæk, and was written by Rasmus Horskjær and directed by Christian Dyekjær. In the series, Kvamm himself plays the lead role as life coach Anders Mertz, who struggles with himself internally, but externally coaches others to "walk themselves" and to optimize and perform in their own lives through self-development platitudes such as "Success is buried on the other side of rejection" and "The best way to predict the future is to create it." All the music for the series, including the theme song, is provided by Hugorm. Other cast members include Frederik Cilius, Kirsten Lehfeldt and Brian Lykke. Season 2 of Guru premiered on DR1 and DRTV on 25 November 2022.

In 2021, Kvamm appeared in season 11 of the TV 2 program Toppen af Poppen, where he participated alongside Alex Vargas, Katinka Bjerregaard, Hjalmer Larsen, Maria Bramsen, Malte Ebert and Mathilde Falch. Here, he performed songs by the other participating artists, both solo and together with Hugorm.

Kvamm was ambassador for Euro2020 at the European Football Championship on home turf, and since 2017 he has been an ambassador for Lær For Livet (Learn for Life). Together with Nephew, and in collaboration with Ungdomsringen, Roskilde Festival, and Bikubenfonden, he co-founded Musikstarter, which aims to encourage more young people to find joy and community in playing music together.

On 27 October 2023, Kvamm received the N.F.S. Grundtvig Prize, which is awarded annually to "a person who, through words, actions, or artistic expression, has communicated knowledge about Grundtvig or has made Grundtvig's ideas applicable in an exceptional way." The prize is awarded by Grundtvigsk Forum, and the motivation behind Kvamm as the prize winner included: "Simon Kvamm writes poetry about the inevitable when we interact with each other and ourselves in a clumsy, opportunistic, and hopeful way. He can count more than one. The one is placed opposite the other, as friends and in love, and also politically, ethically, and religiously. Witty and often outspoken, he writes poetry on all lines of connection."

From 2023 to 2025, Kvamm was a judge on the TV 2 show X Factor. He was presented as a judge in August 2022 for the 16th season of the show together with Kwamie Liv and Thomas Blachman. In his debut season Kvamm won the program with the duo Rosél. He returned as a judge in the following 17th season in 2024, where he with the soloist Helene Frank won the programme again, while his group Selmani ended on second place. Kvamm returned as a judge for a third time for the 18th season of the show where his group 9000 Håb ended on second place. Few days after the X-factor 2025 finale, Kvamm announced that he would not return to the show as a judge.

On February 18th 2025, his 50th birthday, Kvamm announced his solo tour titled "Alle sangene - Kirketour 2025". During the tour in the fall of 2025, Kvamm performed 38 concerts in churches in Denmark where he played songs from his 25 year long career ranging from Nephew, De eneste to, Vandmand and Hugorm. In April 2025, it was reported that Kvamm had donated 500,000 DKK from ticket sales to Folkekirkens Nødhjælp, earmarked to the organization‘s work in Etiopia, which was hit hard by the Trump administration’s closing of USAID. In February of 2026, Kvamm performed two concerts in Royal Arena titled "Alle sangene - Alle vennerne", where he invited 19 of his former and current collaboration partners on stage, including Peter Sommer, Hugorm, Nephew, Henrik Solgård, Nik & Jay, Jada og L.O.C.. He played for around 30.000 audiences over the two nights.

== Personal life ==
Kvamm is married to journalist Stine Ellerbæk, and together they have two daughters, Elinor and Alice. He is a Christian.

== Discography ==
=== Solo ===
- Vandmand (2017)

=== Nephew ===
- Swimming Time (2000)
- USADSB (2004)
- USADSB 10 x så live (2004)
- Interkom Kom Ind (2006)
- Roskilde 07.07.07 (2007)
- Danmark/Denmark (2009)
- Hjertestarter (2012)
- Hjertestarter 10 x Så Live (2013)
- 1-2-3-4-5 (2013)
- Ring-i-Ring (2018)

=== De Eneste To ===
- De Eneste To (2010)
- Dobbeltliv (2014)

=== Drengene fra Angora ===
- Drengene fra Angora (2004)
- Angora by Night (2007)

=== Hugorm ===
- Kom Vi Flygter (2020)
- Tro, Hug & Kærlighed (2022)
- Drømmehug (2024)

== Filmography ==
Year	Title	Role	Notes
2004–2005	Drengene fra Angora	Himself	TV series
2007–2008	Angora by Night	Rolf Engels	TV series
2009	Æblet & ormen	Kartoffel Ypperstepræst	Animated film
2012	Den som dræber - Fortidens skygge	Kristian Almen	Feature film
2021–2022	Guru	Andreas (Anders)	TV series
