= X Factor (Danish TV series) season 16 =

X Factor
- Season 16
- Hosted by: Sofie Linde Ingversen
- Judges: Thomas Blachman; Kwamie Liv; Simon Kvamm
- Winner: ROSÉL
- Winning mentor: Simon Kvamm
- Runner-up: Sigalaz

Release
- Original network: TV2
- Original release: 1 January – 31 March 2023

Season chronology
- ← Previous; Season 15 Next → Season 17

X Factor is a Danish television music competition showcasing new singing talent. This season marked the end of Sofie Linde Ingversen as the host of the show after she announced her departure on 31 January 2023.

For the first time on the Danish X factor a contestant had survived the bottom two 3 times and made it to the semifinals.

Also for the first time on the Danish X Factor That 2 groups made it to the final.

Also a change in the Semi-Finals the contestant who gets eliminated by the public will also sing their very own song and will also be their first single and will be released on the Music Streaming Services.

For the first time ever on the Danish X Factor the final 2 came from the groups category

ROSÉL won the competition and Simon Kvamm became the winning mentor for the first time.

== Judges and hosts ==
Thomas Blachman and Kwamie Liv will return for their fifteenth and second seasons as judges while Martin Jensen has left and will not return and Simon Kvamm will replace Martin Jensen as the new judge Sofie Linde Ingversen will return for her eighth and final season as host

== Selection process ==
Auditions took place in Copenhagen and Aarhus.

The 18 successful acts were:

- Thomas Blachman: Rosita Bramsen, Nanna & Frida, Clara Nedergaard, Sigalaz, Annika Thaarup, Peter Thomsen
- Kwamie Liv: Nimbahlou Christensen, DiVERSE, Mathias Donby, Henrik Hedelund, Lav Sol, Luka Lind
- Simon Kvamm: Kristoffer Lundholm, Misunderstood, Lise Ranks, Malou Røjbæk, ROSÉL, Theodor Vestergaard

=== Bootcamp ===
The 9 eliminated acts were:

- Thomas Blachman: Nanna & Frida, Annika Thaarup, Peter Thomsen
- Kwamie Liv: Mathias Donby, Lav Sol, Luka Lind
- Simon Kvamm: Misunderstood, Lise Ranks, Malou Røjbæk

== Finalists ==
Key:

– Winner
– Runner-up

Act	Age(s)	Hometown	Mentor	Category	Result
ROSÉL	17	Odense & Copenhagen	Simon Kvamm	Groups	Winner
Sigalaz	17-19	Holstebro	Thomas Blachman	Groups	Runner-up
Theodor Vestergaard	17	Augustenborg	Simon Kvamm	15-22s	3rd Place
Nambahlou Christensen	21	Tranekær	Kwamie Liv	15-22s	4th Place
Clara Nedergaard	19	Skanderborg	Thomas Blachman	15-22s	5th Place
Kristoffer Lundholm	26	Aalborg	Simon Kvamm	Over 23s	6th Place
Henrik Hedelund	29	Thorum	Kwamie Liv	Over 23s	7th Place
Rosita Bramsen	29	Aarhus	Thomas Blachman	Over 23s	8th Place
DiVERSE	18-22	Various	Kwamie Liv	Groups	9th Place

== Live shows ==
Colour key

–	Contestant was in the bottom two and had to sing again in the Sing-Off
–	Contestant received the fewest public votes and was immediately eliminated (no Sing-Off)
–	Contestant received the most public votes

Contestants' colour key:

– Kwamie Liv's Contestants
– Thomas Blachmans's Contestants
– Simon Kvamm's Contestants

Contestant	Week 1	Week 2	Week 3	Week 4	Week 5	Week 6	Week 7	
Contestant	Week 1	Week 2	Week 3	Week 4	Week 5	Week 6	1st round	2nd round
ROSÉL	4th 12.62%	3rd 14.75%	2nd 15.65%	4th 16.28%	2nd 22.86%	2nd 25.70%	2nd 37.53%	Winner; 53.92%
Sigalaz	2nd 14.96%	1st 16.77%	4th 15.38%	1st 20.49%	3rd 21.63%	1st 30.53%	1st 39.57%	Runner-up; 46.08%
Theodor Vestergaard	3rd 14.41%	4th 14.60%	5th 14.35%	2nd 17.88%	1st 25.08%	3rd 22.08%	3rd 22.09%	Eliminated (Week 7)
Nambahlou Christensen	7th 7.60%	7th 7.57%	3rd 15.58%	5th 14.69%	5th 13.23%	4th 21.69%	Eliminated (Week 6)	
Clara Nedergaard	1st 17.62%	2nd 15.82%	1st 16.51%	3rd 17.77%	4th 17.20%	Eliminated (Week 5)		
Kristoffer Lundholm	6th 10.44%	6th 11.87%	6th 12.75%	6th 12.88%	Eliminated (Week 4)			
Henrik Hedelund	5th 12.04%	5th 14.04%	7th 9.77%	Eliminated (Week 3)				
Rosita Bramsen	9th 4.77%	8th 4.58%	Eliminated (Week 2)					
DiVERSE	8th 5.54%	Eliminated (Week 1)						
Sing-Off	DiVERSE, Rosita Bramsen	Rosita Bramsen, Nambahlou Christensen	Kristoffer Lundholm, Henrik Hedelund	Kristoffer Lundholm, Nambahlou Christensen	Clara Nedergaard, Nambahlou Christensen	The act that received the fewest public votes was automatically eliminated.		
Blachman voted out	DiVERSE	Nambahlou Christensen	Henrik Hedelund	Kristoffer Lundholm	Nambahlou Christensen	The act that received the fewest public votes was automatically eliminated.		
Liv voted out	Rosita Bramsen	Rosita Bramsen	Kristoffer Lundholm	Kristoffer Lundholm	Clara Nedergaard	The act that received the fewest public votes was automatically eliminated.		
Kvamm voted out	DiVERSE	Rosita Bramsen	Henrik Hedelund	Nambahlou Christensen	Clara Nedergaard	The act that received the fewest public votes was automatically eliminated.		
Eliminated	DiVERSE; 9th	Rosita Bramsen; 8th	Henrik Hedelund; 7th	Kristoffer Lundholm; 6th	Clara Nedergaard; 5th	Nambahlou Christensen; 4th	Theodor Vestergaard; 3rd	Sigalaz; Runner-Up
Eliminated	DiVERSE; 9th	Rosita Bramsen; 8th	Henrik Hedelund; 7th	Kristoffer Lundholm; 6th	Clara Nedergaard; 5th	Nambahlou Christensen; 4th	Theodor Vestergaard; 3rd	ROSÉL; Winner

=== Week 1 (February 17) ===
- Theme: Signature

Contestants' performances on the first live show
Act	Order	Song	Result
Theodor Vestergaard	1	"Fantastiske Toyota"	Safe
Nambahlou Christensen	2	"Call It What You Want"	Safe
Sigalaz	3	"Ghetto Musick"	Safe
Kristoffer Lundholm	4	"Stråle – Tåre – Dråbe"	Safe
DiVERSE	5	"Vogue"	Bottom two
Rosita Bramsen	6	"Tag Det Tilbage" (original song)	Bottom two
ROSÉL	7	"Elskede at Drømme, Drømmer om at Elske"	Safe
Henrik Hedelund	8	"Free and Easy"	Safe
Clara Nedergaard	9	"Strange"	Safe
Sing-Off details
DiVERSE	1	"Nattely"	Eliminated
Rosita Bramsen	2	"One"	Saved

Judges' votes to eliminate

- Blachman: DiVERSE
- Liv: Rosita Bramsen
- Kvamm: DiVERSE

=== Week 2 (February 24) ===
- Theme: Decade 2000s (Songs that had been released from 2000 to 2009)

Contestants' performances on the second live show
Act	Order	Song	Result
ROSÉL	1	"Op med Hovedet"	Safe
Clara Nedergaard	2	"Sweet Dogs"	Safe
Henrik Hedelund	3	"Hun vil Ha en Rapper"	Safe
Rosita Bramsen	4	"Verdensmester"	Bottom two
Nambahlou Christensen	5	"The Pretender"	Bottom two
Theodor Vestergaard	6	"Vi Venter på Vin"	Safe
Sigalaz	7	"Rock Star"	Safe
Kristoffer Lundholm	8	"Vi to"	Safe
Sing-Off details
Rosita Bramsen	1	"Godspeed"	Eliminated
Nambahlou Christensen	2	"Faux-Semblants"	Saved

Judges' votes to eliminate

- Blachman: Nambahlou Christensen
- Liv: Rosita Bramsen
- Kvamm: Rosita Bramsen

=== Week 3 (March 3) ===
- Theme: Soup, Steak & Ice Cream (Danish top & Giro 413 with a twist)
- Musical Guest: Ekspressen ("Godter på Vej")

Contestants' performances on the third live show
Act	Order	Song	Result
Sigalaz	1	"Brdr. Gebis"	Safe
Kristoffer Lundholm	2	"Skibe Uden Sejl"	Bottom two
Nambahlou Christensen	3	"Så Længe Jeg Lever"	Safe
ROSÉL	4	"Rigtige Venner"	Safe
Clara Nedergaard	5	"Ensomhedens Gade No. 9"	Safe
Henrik Hedelund	6	"En Respektabel Mand"	Bottom two
Theodor Vestergaard	7	"Der er Noget Galt i Danmark"	Safe
Sing-Off details
Kristoffer Lundholm	1	"Love & Hate"	Saved
Henrik Hedelund	2	"Café Måneskin"	Eliminated

Judges' votes to eliminate

- Kvamm: Henrik Hedelund
- Liv: Kristoffer Lundholm
- Blachman: Henrik Hedelund

=== Week 4 (March 10) ===
- Theme: At The Club

Contestants' performances on the fourth live show
Act	Order	Song	Result
Clara Nedergaard	1	"These Boots Are Made for Walkin'"	Safe
Theodor Vestergaard	2	"Slikhår"	Safe
Kristoffer Lundholm	3	"Amager Forbrænding"	Bottom two
Sigalaz	4	"Freedom"	Safe
Nambahlou Christensen	5	"Silverflame"	Bottom two
ROSÉL	6	"Kender du Følelsen"	Safe
Sing-Off details
Kristoffer Lundholm	1	"Tiden Læger Alle Sår"	Eliminated
Nambahlou Christensen	2	"As It Was"	Saved

Judges' votes to eliminate

- Kvamm: Nambahlou Christensen
- Liv: Kristoffer Lundholm
- Blachman: Kristoffer Lundholm

=== Week 5 (March 17) ===
- Theme: You Are Not Alone
- Group Performance: "Du er Ikke Alene" (Sebastian; Performed by the Top 5 og The Danish Boys Choir)
- Musical Guest: Jada ("Not Alone")

Contestants' performances on the fifth live show
Act	Order	Song	Result
ROSÉL	1	"Barndommens Gade"	Safe
Clara Nedergaard	2	"Celings"	Bottom two
Nambahlou Christensen	3	"Exist"	Bottom two
Theodor Vestergaard	4	"Under Bøgen"	Safe
Sigalaz	5	"All for Us"	Safe
Final showdown details
Clara Nedergaard	1	"Carry Me Home"	Eliminated
Nambahlou Christensen	2	"Monalisa"	Saved

Judges' votes to eliminate

- Blachman: Nambahlou Christensen
- Liv: Clara Nedergaard
- Kvamm: Clara Nedergaard

=== Week 6: Semi-final (March 24) ===
- Theme: Upcoming & Legends
- Musical Guest: Meum Zel ("Tired") & ("Bounce")

Contestants' performances on the sixth live show
Act	Order	First song (Upcoming)	Order	Second song (Legends)	Result
Nambahlou Christensen	1	"Gode Dage, Gode Drinks"	8	"Forårsdag"	Eliminated
ROSÉL	2	"Det´ Kun Vigtigt, Hvad Det er"	5	"Magisk"	Safe
Sigalaz	3	"Højhus (Hvor Går Vi Hen)"	7	"Følesen"	Safe
Theodor Vestergaard	4	"Formskifter"	6	"Buster"	Safe

The semi-final did not feature a sing-off and instead the act with the fewest public votes, Nambahlou Christensen was automacally eliminated. After Nambahlou Christensen's elimination, she sang "Kan Du Se Mig" which was her own single and she produced it together with Tina Mellemgaard who came in 3rd place in season 15 and will be released on the music streaming services.

=== Week 7: Final (March 31) ===
- Theme: Judges Choice, Duet with a Special Guest, Winner Song
- Musical Guests: Andreas Odbjerg ("Smugryger"), Ida Laurberg ("Terrier") & Scarlet Pleasure ("What A Life")
- Group Performance: "En Stemme" (Minds of 99 performed by The Live Finalists), "Farewell" (Rihanna performed by The Live Finalists & Previous Live Finalists), "Love Yourself" (Justin Bieber performed by The Audtionees)

Contestants' performances on the seventh live show
Act	Order	Judges Choice song	Order	Duet song (with a Special Guest)	Result	Order	Winner Song	Result
Sigalaz	1	"Når Mænd Græder"	6	"Juice"/"All In" (with Blæst)	Safe	8	"Let's Go"	Runner-up
Theodor Vestergaard	2	"Guleroden"	4	"Vi er her ikke for evigt, men vi er her lidt endnu"/"Lyden af Livet" (with Barselona)	Eliminated	N/A (Already Eliminated)		3rd Place
ROSÉL	3	"Uden Forsvar"	5	"Omvendt"/"Dronning af Månen" (with Pil)	Safe	7	"JEG ER ALMINDELIG"	Winner

After Theodor Vestergaard's elimination, he sang "Cirkus Theo" which was his own single and will be released on the music streaming services.
