= X Factor (Danish TV series) =

Danish TV show

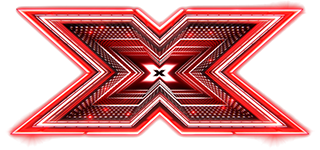
- Official X Factor Denmark logo since 2019.
- Genre: Reality television
- Created by: Simon Cowell
- Creative director: Toniah Pedersen
- Presented by: Lise Rønne; Signe Muusmann; Signe Molde; Eva Harlou; Sofie Linde; Maria Fantino
- Judges: Thomas Blachman; Lina Rafn; Remee; Soulshock; Pernille Rosendahl; Cutfather; Ida Corr; Anne Linnet; Mette Lindberg; Sanne Salomonsen; Ankerstjerne; Oh Land; Martin Jensen; Kwamie Liv; Simon Kvamm; Benjamin Hav; Drew Sycamore
- Country of origin: Denmark
- No. of seasons: 19
- No. of episodes: 237

Production
- Producers: FremantleMedia; SYCOtv; Blu
- Production locations: DR Byen (2008–2018); Priorparken (2019–present)
- Running time: 60–120 minutes

Original release
- Network: DR1 (2008–2018); TV2 (2019–present)
- Release: DR1: January 4, 2008 – April 6, 2018; TV2: January 4, 2019 – present

Related
- The X Factor

X Factor is the Danish version of British TV show The X Factor, created by Simon Cowell. The show premiered on 4 January 2008. For the first eleven seasons, the show was broadcast on DR1 before moving to TV 2 from the twelfth season onwards. There have been nineteen winners to date, most notable are Martin Hoberg Hedegaard (2008), Thomas Ring Petersen (2010), Anthony Jasmin (2014), Place on Earth (2018) & Mads Moldt (2022).

The original judging panel consisted of Thomas Blachman, Lina Rafn and Remee. The most recent panel consisted of Blachman, Drew Sycamore, and Benjamin Hav. Former judges include Soulshock, Pernille Rosendahl, Cutfather, Ida Corr, Anne Linnet, Mette Lindberg, Sanne Salomonsen, Ankerstjerne, Martin Jensen, Kwamie Liv, Oh Land, and Simon Kvamm. The original host was Lise Rønne. The current host is Maria Fantino, who has hosted the show since season 17. Former presenters include Signe Muusmann, Signe Molde, Eva Harlou and Sofie Linde.

On 14 August 2017, DR announced that the show would end after the eleventh season. On 21 December 2017, TV 2 announced that they had acquired the rights to the show. In 2024, it was announced that X Factor had been renewed for an eighteenth season.

== Judging history ==
On 15 October 2007, jazz musician Thomas Blachman, Infernal singer Lina Rafn and songwriter Remee were announced as judges for season 1. On 18 September 2008, Rafn confirmed that she would be returning as a judge for season 2. The following day, it was confirmed that Blachman and Remee would be returning as judges for season 2.

On 13 August 2009, Rafn announced that she would not be returning as a judge for season 3 due to her pregnancy. On 1 October 2009, Blachman confirmed that he would also not be returning as a judge for season 3. On 5 October 2009, it was confirmed that Remee would be returning as a judge for season 3. On 8 October 2009, record producer Soulshock was confirmed as Blachman's replacement. On 15 October 2009, it was announced that The Storm singer Pernille Rosendahl would replace Rafn as the third and final judge for season 3 alongside Remee and Soulshock.

On 19 September 2010, Soulshock confirmed that he had been dropped as a judge for season 4. On 21 September 2010, Blachman confirmed that he would be returning as a judge for season 4, replacing Soulshock. The following day, it was confirmed that Rosendahl would be returning as a judge for season 4. On 24 September 2010, it was confirmed that record producer Cutfather would replace Remee as a judge for season 4. On 13 September 2011, it was announced that Blachman, Rosendahl and Cutfather would be returning as judges for season 5.

On 20 December 2011, Blachman announced that he would be leaving the show at the conclusion of season 5. On 8 February 2012, Rosendahl announced that she would also be leaving the show after season 5 due to starring in the musical Hey Jude. On 10 February 2012, Cutfather announced that season 5 would be his last season as a judge in order to return to his career due to "the show mentally taking time and thought space." On 20 August 2012, despite announcing that he would be leaving the show at the conclusion of season 5, it was confirmed that Blachman would be returning as a judge for season 6, while singers Ida Corr and Anne Linnet would replace Rosendahl and Cutfather.

On 18 September 2013, it was confirmed that Rafn and Remee would be returning to replace Corr and Linnet as judges for season 7 alongside Blachman. On 18 August 2014, it was confirmed that Blachman, Rafn and Remee would be returning as judges for season 8.

On 15 July 2015, Rafn confirmed that she would not be returning as a judge for season 9 due to an Infernal concert tour. On 12 August 2015, it was confirmed that The Asteroids Galaxy Tour singer Mette Lindberg would replace Rafn as a judge for season 9 alongside returning judges Blachman and Remee. On 12 August 2016, it was confirmed that Blachman, Remee and Lindberg would be returning as judges for season 10.

On 2 August 2017, Lindberg announced that she would not be returning as a judge for season 11. On 10 August 2017, it was confirmed that singer Sanne Salomonsen would replace Lindberg as a judge for season 11 alongside returning judges Blachman and Remee.

On 11 April 2018, it was confirmed that Blachman would be returning as a judge for season 12. The following day, Remee confirmed that he would not be returning as a judge for season 12. On 26 April 2018, it was confirmed that Salomonsen would not be returning as a judge for season 12 due to joining DR1's new television music competition LIVE! Danmarks nye live-artist as a judge. On 8 August 2018, it was announced that rapper Ankerstjerne and singer Oh Land would replace Remee and Salomonsen as judges for season 12 alongside Blachman. On 15 August 2019, it was confirmed that Blachman, Ankerstjerne and Oh Land would be returning as judges for season 13.

On 2 July 2020, Ankerstjerne confirmed that he would not be returning as a judge for season 14 in order to focus on "new dreams and projects," but did not rule out a return in the future. On 11 September 2020, it was announced that DJ Martin Jensen would replace Ankerstjerne as a judge for season 14 alongside returning judges Blachman and Oh Land.

On 23 July 2021, Oh Land announced that she would not be returning as a judge for season 15, stating that she "could not do everything at once."

== Hosts and Judges ==
Hosts	Lise Rønne: 2008–2009, 2011–2012; Signe Muusmann: 2010; Signe Molde: 2013; Eva Harlou: 2014–2015; Sofie Linde 2016–2023; Maria Fantino 2024–present
Guest hosts	Joakim Ingversen: 2018 (2 Liveshows); Lise Rønne: 2021 (liveshows); Melvin Kakooza: 2020 (bootcamp)
Xtra hosts	Emil Thorup: 2013; Thomas Skov: 2015; Joakim Ingversen: 2016–2018; Jacob Riising: 2018; Rasmus Brohave: 2019
Judges	Thomas Blachman: 2008–2009, 2011–present; Lina Rafn: 2008–2009, 2014–2015; Remee Jackson: 2008–2010, 2014–2018; Soulshock: 2010; Pernille Rosendahl: 2010–2012; Cutfather: 2011–2012; Ida Corr: 2013; Anne Linnet: 2013; Mette Lindberg: 2016–2017; Sanne Salomonsen: 2018; Ankerstjerne: 2019–2020; Oh Land: 2019–2021, 2024–2025; Martin Jensen: 2021–2022; Kwamie Liv: 2022–2023; Simon Kvamm: 2023–2025; Benjamin Hav 2026–present; Drew Sycamore 2026–present
Guest judges	Kasper Winding: 2008; Michael Guldhammer: 2008; Cutfather: 2008; Henrik Balling: 2009; Adam Powers: 2009; Martin Dodd: 2009; Thomas Troelsen: 2010; Toniah Pedersen: 2010; Nikolaj Steen: 2010; Djuna Barnes: 2011; Le Gammeltoft: 2011; Kenneth Bager: 2011; Dicte: 2012; Mattias Kolstrup: 2012; Kato: 2012; Vinne Who: 2013; Carla Camilla Hjort: 2013; Marcus Linnet: 2013; Linnart Ginman og Carsten Dahl: 2014; Patrick Spiegelberg og Jonas Worup: 2014; Chief 1: 2014

== Series overview ==
To date, nineteen seasons have been broadcast, as summarised below. From season 15 onwards, the judges mentored one act from each category to the live shows: one from the 15-22s, one from the Over 23s, and one from the Groups.

Season	Premiere	Finale	Host	1st judge	2nd judge	3rd judge	Winner	Runner-up	Winning judge
DR1 era (2008–2018)
1	4 January 2008	28 March 2008	Lise Rønne	Thomas Blachman	Lina Rafn	Remee Jackson	Martin Hoberg Hedegaard (15-24s)	Laura Arensbak Kjærgaard (15-24s)	Remee
2	2 January 2009	27 March 2009	Lise Rønne	Thomas Blachman	Lina Rafn	Remee Jackson	Linda Andrews (Over 25s)	Alien Beat Club (Groups)	Lina Rafn
3	1 January 2010	27 March 2010	Signe Muusmann	Soulshock	Pernille Rosendahl	Remee Jackson	Thomas Ring Petersen (Over 25s)	Tine Midtgaard Madsen (15-24s)	Pernille Rosendahl
4	1 January 2011	25 March 2011	Lise Rønne	Thomas Blachman	Pernille Rosendahl	Cutfather	Sarah Skaalum Jørgensen (15-24s)	Annelouise Sørensen (Over 25s)	Cutfather
5	1 January 2012	23 March 2012	Lise Rønne	Thomas Blachman	Pernille Rosendahl	Cutfather	Ida Østergaard Madsen (15-24s)	Line Dissing Karred Larsen (15-24s)	Pernille Rosendahl
6	28 December 2012	22 March 2013	Signe Molde	Thomas Blachman	Ida Corr	Anne Linnet	Chresten Flack Damborg (Over 24s)	Karoline (15-23s)	Ida Corr
7	3 January 2014	28 March 2014	Eva Harlou	Thomas Blachman	Lina Rafn	Remee Jackson	Anthony Jasmin (Groups)	Lucy Mardou (Over 23s)	Thomas Blachman
8	2 January 2015	27 March 2015	Eva Harlou	Thomas Blachman	Lina Rafn	Remee Jackson	Emilie Esther (15-22s)	Jógvan (Over 23s)	Remee
9	8 January 2016	1 April 2016	Sofie Linde	Thomas Blachman	Mette Lindberg	Remee Jackson	Embrace (Groups)	Reem Hamze (15-22s)	Remee
10	30 December 2016	31 March 2017	Sofie Linde	Thomas Blachman	Mette Lindberg	Remee Jackson	Morten Nørgaard (Over 23s)	Chili Pedersen (15-22s)	Remee
11	1 January 2018	6 April 2018	Sofie Linde	Thomas Blachman	Sanne Salomonsen	Remee Jackson	Place on Earth (Groups)	Jamie Talbot (Over 23s)	Thomas Blachman
TV2 revival era (2019–present)
12	4 January 2019	12 April 2019	Sofie Linde	Thomas Blachman	Oh Land	Ankerstjerne	Kristian Kjærlund (Over 23s)	Benjamin Rosenbohm (15-22s)	Thomas Blachman
13	1 January 2020	23 May 2020	Sofie Linde	Thomas Blachman	Oh Land	Ankerstjerne	Alma Agger (15-22s)	Mathilde Caffey (15-22s)	Thomas Blachman
14	1 January 2021	9 April 2021	Sofie Linde	Thomas Blachman	Oh Land	Martin Jensen	Solveig Lindelof (15-22s)	Nikoline Steen Kristensen (15-22s)	Oh Land
15	1 January 2022	8 April 2022	Sofie Linde	Thomas Blachman	Kwamie Liv	Martin Jensen	Mads Moldt (15-22s)	Kári Fossdalsá (Over 23s)	Thomas Blachman
16	1 January 2023	31 March 2023	Sofie Linde	Thomas Blachman	Kwamie Liv	Simon Kvamm	ROSÉL (Groups)	Sigalaz (Groups)	Simon Kvamm
17	1 January 2024	5 April 2024	Maria Fantino	Thomas Blachman	Oh Land	Simon Kvamm	Helene Frank (Over 23s)	Selmani (Groups)	Simon Kvamm
18	27 December 2024	4 April 2025	Maria Fantino	Thomas Blachman	Oh Land	Simon Kvamm	Leslie (15-22s)	9000 Håb (Groups)	Oh Land
19	1 January 2026	10 April 2026	Maria Fantino	Thomas Blachman	Drew Sycamore	Benjamin Hav	Hugo A (15-22s)	Hevi (15-22s)	Benjamin Hav
20	2027	2027	Maria Fantino	Thomas Blachman	Drew Sycamore	Benjamin Hav	Upcoming season		

== Judges' categories and their contestants ==
Key:

– Winning judge/category. Winners are in bold, eliminated contestants in small font.

Season	Thomas Blachman	Lina Rafn	Remee
1	**Over 25s** Heidi Svelmøe Herløw; Lisa Maria Birkekvist; Frederik Konradsen	**Groups**; VocaLoca; RaiDen; Søren & Anne	**15-24s** **Martin Hoberg Hedegaard**; Laura Arensbak Kjærgaard; Basim Moujahid
2	**15-24s** Mohamed Ali; Sidsel Lieknins Vestertjele; Lucas Francis Claver	**Over 25s** **Linda Andrews**; Seest Christensen; Claus Lillelund	**Groups**; Alien Beat Club; Asian Sensation; Tårnhøj
Season	Soulshock	Pernille Rosendahl	Remee
3	**Groups**; The Fireflies; 8210; In-Joy	**Over 25s** **Thomas Ring Petersen**; Daniel Vengsgaard; Peter Søborg	**15-24s** Tine Midtgaard Madsen; Jesper Boesgaard; Anna Nygaard
Season	Thomas Blachman	Pernille Rosendahl	Cutfather
4	**Over 25s** Annelouise Sørensen; Patricia Bull; Ercan Turan	**Groups**; Rikke & Trine; JR; Deevibez	**15-24s** **Sarah Skaalum Jørgensen**; Babou; Rasmus Nielsen
5	**Groups**; Nicoline Simone & Jean Michel; Tandberg & Østenby; Phuong & Rasmus	**15-24s** **Ida Østergaard Madsen**; Line Dissing Karred Larsen; Morten Benjamin	**Over 25s** Sveinur Gaard Olsen; Mulila Phiri; Katrine Klith Andersen
Season	Thomas Blachman	Ida Corr	Anne Linnet
6	**15-23s** Karoline Hassan; Amanda Pedersen; Zaina Jouret	**Over 24s** **Chresten Falck Damborg**; Stephanie Ravn Carlsen; Jonas Præst Nielsen	**Groups**; Wasteland; Anna & Lusanda; Lotus
Season	Thomas Blachman	Lina Rafn	Remee
7	**Groups**; **Anthony Jasmin**; ManBand lickety-split	**14-22s** Henriette Haubjerg; Fie Winther; Mathias Chrøis	**Over 23s** Lucy Mardou; Pernille Nordtorp; Steffen Gilmartin
8	**Groups**; Ivarsson, Bang & Neumann; Citybois; Finn & Rie	**Over 23s** Jógvan Joensen; Sophia Nohr; Nanni Klitte	**15-22s** **Emilie Esther**; Baraa Qadoura; Tannaz Hakami
Season	Thomas Blachman	Mette Lindberg	Remee
9	**Over 23s** Andrew Murray; Sarah Glerup; Jacob Bering	**15-22s** Reem Hamze; Alex Benson; Mads Christian	**Groups**; **Embrace**; Clifforth & Hein; The Competition
10	**15-22s** Chili Pedersen; Mia Sørensen; Martin Prytz	**Groups**; VKation; Ladies with Attitude; Fyhnen Sisters	**Over 23s** **Morten Nørgaard**; Samanta Gomez; Mike Beck
Season	Thomas Blachman	Sanne Salomonsen	Remee
11	**Groups**; **Place on Earth**; Sol & Christian; Anne Mette & Tomas	**15-22s** Sigmund Trondheim; Vita Jensen; Oliver Bendixen	**Over 23s** Jamie Talbot; Rasmus Therkildsen; Anja Nynne
Season	Thomas Blachman	Oh Land	Ankerstjerne
12	**Over 23s** **Kristian Kjærlund**; Gina Michaells; Andrea Brøndsted	**Groups**; Echo; Maria & Bea; Dr. Rolf & Kanylerne	**15-22s** Benjamin Rosenbohm; Live Vogel; Patrick Smith
13	**15-22s** **Alma Agger**; Mathilde Caffey; Emil Wismann	**Over 23s** Ilona Artene; Kaspar "Kali" Andersen; Nicklas Mietke	**Groups**; Smokey Eyes; Magnus & Aksel; Sway
Season	Thomas Blachman	Oh Land	Martin Jensen
14	**Groups**; Simon & Marcus; The Kubrix; Neva & Ida	**15-22s** **Solveig Lindelof**; Nikoline Steen Kristensen; Lucca Nordlund	**Over 23s** Dan Laursen; Vilson Ferati; Hiba Chehade
Season	Thomas Blachman	Kwamie Liv	Martin Jensen
15	**Mads Moldt (15-22s)**; Maria Ranum (Over 23s); Wela & Garcia (Groups)	Tina Mellemgaard (15-22s); Oliver Antonio (Over 23s); Lorenzo & Charlo (Groups)	Kári Fossdalsá (Over 23s); Mille Bergholtz (15-22s); Oscar (Groups)
Season	Thomas Blachman	Kwamie Liv	Simon Kvamm
16	Sigalaz (Groups); Clara Nedergaard (15-22s); Rosita Bramsen (Over 23s)	Nambahlou Christensen (15-22s); Henrik Hedelund (Over 23s); DiVERSE (Groups)	**ROSÉL (Groups)**; Theodor Vestergaard (15-22s); Kristoffer Lundholm (Over 23s)
Season	Thomas Blachman	Oh Land	Simon Kvamm
17	Cristian Oprea (15-22s); Kaos (Groups); Mariya Apollonia (Over 23s)	Elva Wahlberg (15-22s); Cyklus (Groups); Nicolaj Lindby (Over 23s)	**Helene Frank (Over 23s)**; Selmani (Groups); Victor Hauch (15-22s)
18	Svend (15-22s); Blomster Bror (Groups); Julie (Over 23s)	**Leslie (15-22s)**; Darling (Groups); Laura (Over 23s)	9000 Håb (Groups); Thomas Ove (Over 23s); Hva Så Asta (15-22s)
Season	Thomas Blachman	Drew Sycamore	Benjamin Hav
19	Hevi (15-22s); Rasmus Djurhuus (Over 23s); 44 m² (Groups)	Ella Sophia (15-22s); MLI (Over 23s); Sara+Marie (Groups)	**Hugo A** (15-22s); 4 Flotte Fyre (Groups); Jakob Hasselstrøm (Over 23s)

== Season synopses ==
=== 2008–2018: DR ===
==== Season 1 (2008) ====
The first season premiered on 4 January 2008 and ended on 28 March 2008. The host was Lise Rønne, while the judges were jazz musician Thomas Blachman, Infernal singer Lina Rafn and songwriter Remee.

The auditions took place from 3 to 4 November 2007 at DR Byen in Copenhagen and 7 to 8 November 2007 at DR Østjylland in Århus. The audition episodes were broadcast over three episodes on 4, 11 and 18 January 2008. After the auditions, the judges were given their categories. Remee was given the 15-24s, Rafn was given the Groups, and Blachman was given the Over 25s. For bootcamp, the judges disbanded and took their categories to three different locations. Remee took the 15-24s to Puk-studierne in Randers, Rafn took the Groups to Hotel Marienlyst in Helsingør and Blachman took the Over 25s to Dragsholm Castle in Hørve. The judges were also accompanied by an assistant, who worked in the music industry. Remee was assisted by record producer Cutfather, Rafn was assisted by Border Breakers director Michael Guldhammer, and Blachman was assisted by composer Kasper Winding. Bootcamp was broadcast over two episodes on 25 January and 1 February 2008. The live shows began on 8 February 2008 at DR Byen. During the sixth week of the live shows, Anne Linnet helped mentor the acts. Shayne Ward, who won the second series of the original British version, performed on the sixth results show. James Blunt performed on the seventh results show.

During the semi-final on 21 March 2008, Remee became the winning mentor after his two acts Martin and Laura advanced to the final. Martin won the first season on 28 March 2008, defeating Laura, and won a recording contract with Sony BMG. He released "The 1" as his winner's single. "The 1" was written by singer Niels Brinck and produced by Per Sunding, which would be released by Martin or Laura if they won.

==== Season 2 (2009) ====
Remee, Lina Rafn and Thomas Blachman returned as judges. Remee was given the Groups, Rafn was given the Over 25s and Blachman was in charge of the Under 25s. The winner was Linda Andrews, mentored by Rafn.

==== Season 3 (2010) ====
Remee returned as a judge, while Thomas Blachman and Lina Rafn were replaced by Soulshock and Pernille Rosendahl. Soulshock was given the Groups, Rosendahl was given the Over 25s and Remee was in charge of the Under 25s. The winner was Thomas Ring Petersen, mentored by Rosendahl. British singer and X Factor UK judge Cheryl Cole performed her number one single "Fight for This Love".

==== Season 4 (2011) ====
Pernille Rosendahl continued as a judge, while original judge Thomas Blachman and new judge Cutfather replaced Soulshock and Remee on the judging panel. Cutfather was given the Under 25s, Rosendahl was given the Groups and Blachman was given the Over 25s. The winner was Sarah, mentored by Cutfather.

==== Season 5 (2012) ====
Thomas Blachman, Pernille Rosendahl and Cutfather returned for their respective fourth, third and second seasons. Cutfather was given the Over 25s, Rosendahl was given the Under 25s and Blachman was in charge of the Groups. The winner was Ida Østergaard Madsen, mentored by Rosendahl.

For the first (and currently only) time, a judge made an unforced decision to eliminate their own act.

==== Season 6 (2012–13) ====
Thomas Blachman returned to the judging panel, while Pernille Rosendahl and Cutfather were replaced by new judges Ida Corr and Anne Linnet. Linnet was given the Groups, Corr was given the Over 24s and Blachman was in charge of the Under 24s. The winner was Chresten, mentored by Corr.

==== Season 7 (2014) ====
The seventh season returned to the original judging panel consisting of Thomas Blachman, Lina Rafn and Remee following the departures of Ida Corr and Anne Linnet. Remee had the Over 23s, Rafn had the 15-22s and Blachman was in charge of the Groups. The winners were Anthony Jasmin, mentored by Blachman.

==== Season 8 (2015) ====
Thomas Blachman, Remee and Lina Rafn returned to the judging panel for their respective seventh, fifth and fourth seasons. Remee was given the 15-22s, Rafn was given the Over 23s and Blachman was given the Groups. Superbootcamp was replaced by 5 Chair Challenge. The winner was Emilie Esther, mentored by Remee.

==== Season 9 (2016) ====
Thomas Blachman and Remee will return as judges for season 9 along with a new judge Mette Lindberg who will replace Lina Rafn. Rafn said in the final of season 8 that she did not know if she would continue as a judge. Eva Harlou announced on 26 June 2015 that she will not return to host. Sofie Linde Lauridsen will be the new host. Rafn announced on 15 July 2015 that she would not be returning as a judge. The winners were Embrace mentored by Remee.

==== Season 10 (2016–17) ====
Thomas Blachman, Mette Lindberg and Remee Will all return for Season 10 and Sofie Linde will also return as host On 31 March 2016 it was announced that X Factor will return for season 10 in 2017. It will begin on 30 December 2016 the winner was Morten Nørgaard mentored by Remee.

==== Season 11 (2018) ====
On 31 March 2017, it was announced by DR that X Factor will return for season 11 in 2018. Sofie Linde Lauridsen will return to host the show for the 3rd time Thomas Blachman and Remee also returned and is joined by a new judge Sanne Salomonsen who will replace Mette Lindberg. The Winner was Place on Earth mentored by Thomas Blachman

=== 2019–present: TV2 ===
==== Season 12 (2019) ====
Sofie Linde Lauridsen will return to host the show for the 4th time Thomas Blachman returned and is joined by a new judges Oh Land and Ankerstjerne who will replace Remee and Sanne Salomonsen. The Winner was Kristian Kjærlund mentored by Thomas Blachman

==== Season 13 (2020) ====
Thomas Blachman, Oh Land and Ankerstjerne Will all return as judges for Season 13 and Sofie Linde Ingversen also return as host for the 5th time. The Winner was Alma Agger mentored by Thomas Blachman

==== Season 14 (2021) ====
Thomas Blachman and Oh Land returned as judges for Season 14 while Ankerstjerne left and was replaced by Martin Jensen and Sofie Linde Ingversen only returned as host for the auditions, 5 Chair Challenge and bootcamp Lise Rønne returned as host for the live shows also. The Winner was Solveig Lindelof mentored by Oh Land

==== Season 15 (2022) ====
Thomas Blachman and Martin Jensen will return as judges for Season 15 but Oh Land has announced that she will leave as a judge and was replaced by Kwamie Liv and Sofie Linde Ingversen will return as the main host. The Winner was Mads Moldt metored by Thomas Blachman.

==== Season 16 (2023) ====
Thomas Blachman and Kwamie Liv will return as judges for Season 16 but Martin Jensen has announced that he will leave as a judge and was replaced by Simon Kvamm and Sofie Linde Ingversen will return as the main host and also her last season as host. The Winner was ROSÉL mentored by Simon Kvamm.

==== Season 17 (2024) ====
Thomas Blachman and Simon Kvamm returned as judges for Season 17, but Kwamie Liv has announced that she will leave as a judge and Oh Land replaced her as judge and Sofie Linde Ingversen has left the show as the main host and Maria Fantino will replace her as the main host. The Winner was Helene Frank metored by Simon Kvamm.

==== Season 18 (2025) ====
Thomas Blachman, Oh Land and Simon Kvamm all returned as judges for Season 18. Additionally, Maria Fantino returned for her second season as host. The Winner was Leslie mentored by Oh Land.

==== Season 19 (2026) ====
Thomas Blachman returned as a judge for Season 19 and will be joined by two new judges: Drew Sycamore and Benjamin Hav, replacing Oh Land and Simon Kvamm, respectively. Additionally, Maria Fantino returned for her third season as host. The Winner was Hugo A mentored by Benjamin Hav.

== Controversy ==
The Danish X Factor has been criticised by music expert and consultant for The Danish Musicians' Association (Dansk Musiker Forbund) Mikael Højris, who claims that the contracts for participation in the show are unfair on participants and almost amount to serfdom to DR1 (the channel airing the show) stating that clauses in the contracts forbid the participants - whether they pass the first round or not - from performing or participating in any other musical event for three months. He also criticises that participants are obliged to travel at their own expense.

Bente Boserup, leader of BørneTelefonen, criticized the Danish X Factor for exposing children under 18 to high pressure and stress, after contestants Baraa Qadoura and Tannaz Hakami broke down in tears during the fourth live show of season 8. This was supported by psychologist John Halse, as well as contestant Finn Irs, who protested by not showing up to the all-stars song during the final live show. Irs stated that the producers were more interested in their contestants showing their emotions, rather than making a musical show. Jan Lagermand Lundme, the contributing editor on DR1, stated that all contestants were checked by a psychologist to see if they were fit to handle the pressure.

Despite this, the series has remained quite popular within the Danish public.
