= X Factor (Danish TV series) season 6 =

X Factor
- Season 6
- Hosted by: Signe Molde
- Judges: Thomas Blachman; Ida Corr; Anne Linnet
- Winner: Chresten
- Winning mentor: Ida Corr
- Runner-up: Karoline
- Finals venue: Jyske Bank Boxen

Release
- Original network: DR1
- Original release: December 28, 2012 – March 22, 2013

Season chronology
- ← Previous; Season 5 Next → Season 7

X Factor is a Danish television music competition to find new singing talent. The sixth season premiered on December 28, 2012 on DR1 and ended on March 22, 2013. Signe Molde replaced Lise Rønne as host, while Emil Thorup hosted new spin-off show Xtra Factor. Thomas Blachman returned for his fifth season as judge, while Ida Corr and Anne Linnet joined the judging panel as replacements for former judges, Pernille Rosendahl and Cutfather.

At the final on March 22 at Jyske Bank Boxen, Chresten, mentored by Corr, was announced as the winner.

== Judges and hosts ==
Season 6 judges

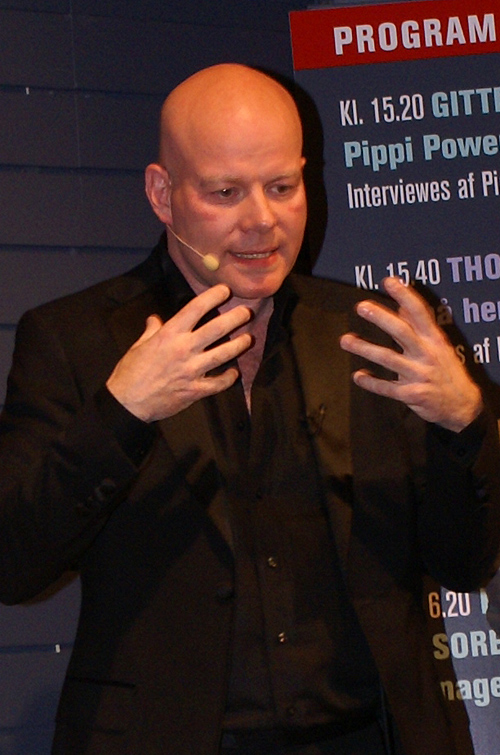
Thomas Blachman

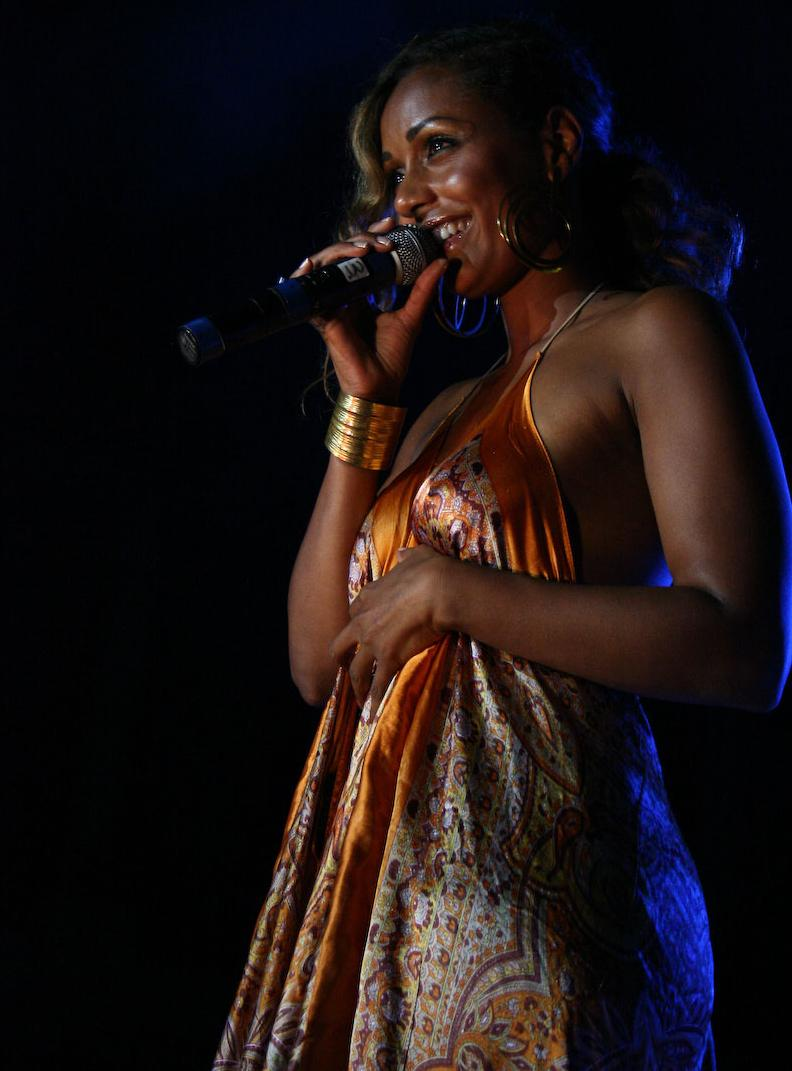
Ida Corr

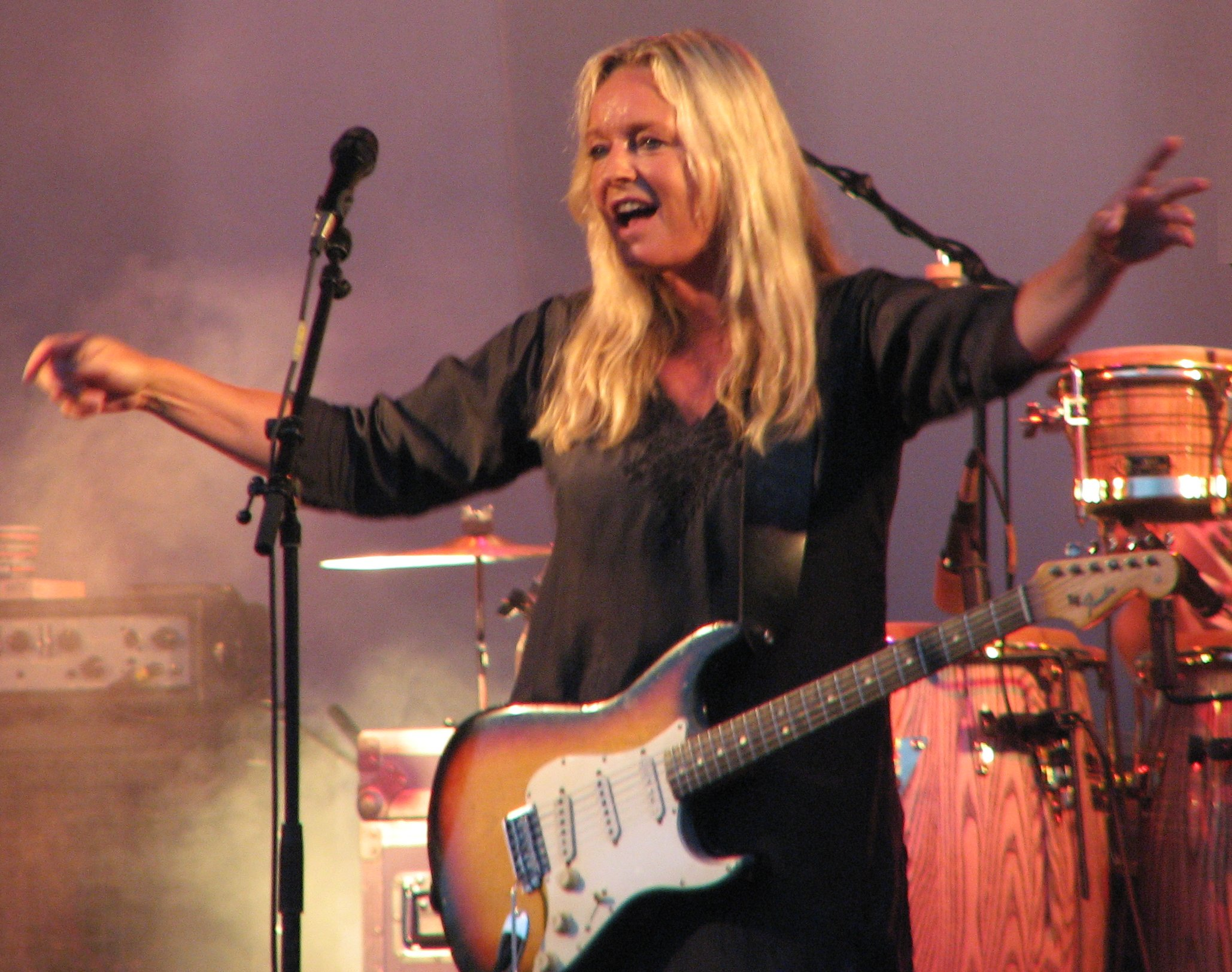
Anne Linnet

After the sixth live show of the sixth season on March 15, 2013, Ida Corr was asked if she would return as a judge for another season and said that she did not know. On 17 June, it was reported that former judge Remee, who appeared in the first three seasons, was in talks with DR1 to return as a judge for season 7. On August 16, it was announced that Eva Harlou would replace Signe Molde as host for the seventh season. On 17 September, judge Anne Linnet revealed that Lina Rafn, who appeared in the first two seasons, and Remee would be re-joining Thomas Blachman for season 7.

== Selection process ==
=== Bootcamp ===
The 6 eliminated acts were:

- 15-23s: Emil, Sarah
- Over 24s: Dariana, Stine
- Groups: Mette & Henrik, Nanna & Sofia

== Contestants ==
– Winner
– Runner-up

| Categories (mentor) | Acts | | |
|---|---|---|---|
| 15-23s (Blachman) | Amanda Pedersen | Karoline Hassan | Zaina Jouret |
| Over 24s (Corr) | Chresten Falck Damborg | Jonas Præst Nielsen | Stephanie Ravn Carlsen |
| Groups (Linnet) | Anna & Lusanda | Lotus | Wasteland |

== Live shows ==
=== Results summary ===
Colour key

| – | Contestant was in the bottom two and had to sing again in the final showdown |
| – | Contestant received the fewest public votes and was immediately eliminated (no final showdown) |
| – | Contestant received the most public votes |

Contestants' colour key:

– Blachman's contestants (15-23s)
– Corr's contestants (Over 24s)
– Linnet's contestants (Groups)

| | Week 1 | Week 2 | Week 3 | Week 4 | Week 5 | | Week 6 | Week 7 | |
| | Week 1 | Week 2 | Week 3 | Week 4 | 1st round | 2nd round | Week 6 | 1st round | 2nd round |
|---|---|---|---|---|---|---|---|---|---|
| Chresten | 1st 25,7% | 1st 19,1% | 3rd 17,0% | 3rd 19,7% | 1st 33,4% | —N/a | 1st 33,6% | 1st 48,3% | Winner; 57,9% |
| Karoline | 4th 13,5% | 3rd 14,4% | 2nd 17,0% | 1st 20,1% | 4th 14,3% | 1st 64,8% | 2nd 24,6% | 2nd 36,5% | Runner-Up; 42,1% |
| Wasteland | 5th 8,5% | 2nd 14,9% | 1st 18,2% | 6th 13,1% | 2nd 24,4% | —N/a | 3rd 21,5% | 3rd 15,2% | Eliminated (Week 7) |
| Amanda | 3rd 14,9% | 5th 12,2% | 4th 14,9% | 2nd 19,9% | 3rd 21,9% | —N/a | 4th 20,3% | Eliminated (Week 6) | |
| Stephanie | 7th 5,9% | 6th 10,6% | 7th 9,3% | 4th 13,8% | 5th 6,0% | 2nd 35,2% | Eliminated (Week 5) | | |
| Anna & Lusanda | 2nd 17,0% | 4th 13,8% | 5th 14,9% | 5th 13,5% | Eliminated (Week 4) | | | | |
| Jonas | 8th 4,7% | 7th 9,3% | 6th 10,9% | Eliminated (Week 3) | | | | | |
| Zaina | 6th 7,1% | 8th 5,7% | Eliminated (Week 2) | | | | | | |
| Lotus | 9th 2,7% | Eliminated (Week 1) | | | | | | | |
| Fewest votes | Jonas, Lotus | Jonas, Zaina | Jonas, Stephanie | Anna & Lusanda, Wasteland | Karoline, Stephanie | | The act that received the fewest public votes was automatically eliminated. | | |
| Linnet voted out | Jonas | Zaina | - | Anna & Lusanda | —N/a | | The act that received the fewest public votes was automatically eliminated. | | |
| Corr voted out | Lotus | Zaina | Jonas | Anna & Lusanda | —N/a | | The act that received the fewest public votes was automatically eliminated. | | |
| Blachman voted out | Lotus | Jonas | Jonas | Wasteland | —N/a | | The act that received the fewest public votes was automatically eliminated. | | |
| Eliminated | Lotus; 9th | Zaina; 8th | Jonas; 7th | Anna & Lusanda; 6th | Stephanie; 5th | | Amanda; 4th | Wasteland; 3rd | Karoline; Runner-up |
| Eliminated | Lotus; 9th | Zaina; 8th | Jonas; 7th | Anna & Lusanda; 6th | Stephanie; 5th | | Amanda; 4th | Wasteland; 3rd | Chresten; Winner |

=== Live show details ===
==== Week 1 (February 9) ====
- Theme: Hope

Contestants' performances on the first live show
| Act | Order | Song | Result |
|---|---|---|---|
| Wasteland | 1 | "Too Close" | Safe |
| Stephanie | 2 | "Jóga" | Safe |
| Zaina | 3 | "Breezeblocks" | Safe |
| Lotus | 4 | "Tror på dig" | Eliminated |
| Chresten | 5 | "Last Po' Man"/"No Diggity" | Safe (Highest votes) |
| Karoline | 6 | "DJ Blues" | Safe |
| Anna & Lusanda | 7 | "My Kind of Love" | Safe |
| Amanda | 8 | "Oh Love" | Safe |
| Jonas | 9 | "With Every Heartbeat" | Bottom two |

Judges' votes to eliminate

- Corr: Lotus
- Linnet: Jonas
- Blachman: Lotus

==== Week 2 (February 15) ====
- Theme: Against

Contestants' performances on the second live show
| Act | Order | Song | Result |
|---|---|---|---|
| Zaina | 1 | "Green Garden" | Eliminated |
| Chresten | 2 | "Magic"/"Love Lockdown" | Safe (Highest votes) |
| Anna & Lusanda | 3 | "Lights" | Safe |
| Amanda | 4 | "Chimacum Rain" | Safe |
| Jonas | 5 | "Bulletproof" | Bottom two |
| Karoline | 6 | "Get Free" | Safe |
| Wasteland | 7 | "Radioactive" | Safe |
| Stephanie | 8 | "Heartbeats" | Safe |

Judges' votes to eliminate

- Corr: Zaina
- Blachman: Jonas
- Linnet: Zaina

==== Week 3 (February 22) ====
- Theme: Power

Contestants' performances on the third live show
| Act | Order | Song | Result |
|---|---|---|---|
| Anna & Lusanda | 1 | "Try Sleeping with a Broken Heart" | Safe |
| Jonas | 2 | "Take Me Out" | Eliminated |
| Amanda | 3 | "Youth" | Safe |
| Chresten | 4 | "Little Black Submarines"/"No Church in the Wild" | Safe |
| Karoline | 5 | "The Gentle Roar" | Safe |
| Stephanie | 6 | "The Power of Good-Bye" | Bottom two |
| Wasteland | 7 | "Stop for a Minute" | Safe (Highest votes) |

Judges' votes to eliminate

- Blachman: Jonas
- Linnet decided to let Corr decide between her two acts
- Corr: Jonas

==== Week 4 (March 1) ====
- Theme: DR Bigband

Contestants' performances on the fourth live show
| Act | Order | Song | Result |
|---|---|---|---|
| Chresten | 1 | "Bitter Sweet Symphony" | Safe |
| Amanda | 2 | "Cry Me a River" | Safe |
| Wasteland | 3 | "Diamonds" | Bottom two |
| Anna & Lusanda | 4 | "The Boy Is Mine" | Eliminated |
| Karoline | 5 | "Don't Stop the Music" | Safe (Highest votes) |
| Stephanie | 6 | "Spectrum (Say My Name)" | Safe |

Judges' votes to eliminate

- Blachman: Wasteland
- Corr: Anna & Lusanda
- Linnet: Anna & Lusanda

==== Week 5 (March 8) ====
- Theme: Danish hits
- Guest mentors: Remee and Cutfather
- Musical Guests: Panamah ("Børn af Natten") & Rasmus Walter ("Endeløst")
- Group performances: "Mine øjne de skal se" / "Jeg vil ha' dig for mig selv" / "Jeg tager imod" / "Den jeg elsker" / "Midt om natten"

Contestants' performances on the fifth live show
| Act | Order | Song | Result |
|---|---|---|---|
| Chresten | 1 | "Sweet Dogs" | Safe (Highest votes) |
| Stephanie | 2 | "Under the Water" | Eliminated |
| Wasteland | 3 | "Fact-Fiction" | Safe |
| Amanda | 4 | "Hollow Talk" | Safe |
| Karoline | 5 | "Superstar" | Bottom two |

==== Week 6: Semi-final (March 15) ====
- Theme: Viewers choice; Judges choice
- Musical Guest: Ida ("Underdog")

Contestants' performances on the sixth live show
| Act | Order | First song | Order | Second song | Result |
|---|---|---|---|---|---|
| Amanda | 1 | "I Knew You Were Trouble" | 5 | "Lullabies" | Eliminated |
| Chresten | 2 | "Let Her Go" | 6 | "One Day / Reckoning Song" | Safe (Highest votes) |
| Karoline | 3 | "As Long as You Love Me" | 7 | "Girl with the Tattoo (Enter.Lewd)" | Safe |
| Wasteland | 4 | "What Makes You Beautiful" | 8 | "She Has No Time" | Safe |

The semi-final did not feature a final showdown and instead the act with the fewest public votes, Amanda, was automatically eliminated.

==== Week 7: Final (March 22) ====
Contestants' performances on the seventh live show
| Act | Order | First song | Order | Second song (duet) | Order | Third song | Result |
|---|---|---|---|---|---|---|---|
| Chresten | 1 | "Where Did You Sleep Last Night?" | 4 | "Uden forsvar" and "Endeløst" (with Marie Key and Rasmus Walter) | 8 | "Let Go" | Winner |
| Wasteland | 2 | "Ikke mere tid" | 5 | "Børn af natten" and "Elephant" (with Panamah and Mads Langer) | N/A | N/A (Already eliminated) | 3rd Place |
| Karoline | 3 | "Glass" | 6 | "Ask Yourself" and "Din for evigt" (with Nabiha and Burhan G) | 7 | "Det er her vi bor" | Runner-up |
