= X Factor (Danish TV series) season 17 =

X Factor
- Season 17
- Hosted by: Maria Fantino
- Judges: Thomas Blachman; Oh Land; Simon Kvamm
- Winner: Helene Frank
- Winning mentor: Simon Kvamm
- Runner-up: Selmani

Release
- Original network: TV2
- Original release: January 1 – April 5, 2024

Season chronology
- ← Previous; Season 16

X Factor is a Danish television music competition showcasing new singing talent. Maria Fantino is the new host to the show After Sofie Linde stepped down as host and Thomas Blachman and Simon Kvamm will return for their 16th and 2nd time as judges and they will be joined by Oh Land who is returning for 4th time as judge replacing Kwamie Liv as judge.

Helene Frank Won the Competition and The Brothers duo Selmani became the runner-up of the season and Simon Kvamm became winning mentor for the second season in a row.

== Selection process ==
Auditions took place in Copenhagen and Aarhus.

The 18 successful acts were:

- Thomas Blachman: Mariya Apollonia, Aske & William, Ea Houbo Christensen, Sara Høgh, Kaos, Cristian Oprea
- Oh Land: Cyklus, Elipreeya, Mette Jeppesen, Nicolaj Lindby, August Tómasson, Elva Wahlberg
- Simon Kvamm: Anton & Viktor, Helene Frank, Victor Hauch, Selmani, Thilde Steffensen, Jonas Thomsen

=== Bootcamp ===
The 9 eliminated acts were:

- Thomas Blachman: Aske & William, Ea Houbo Christensen, Sara Høgh
- Oh Land: Elipreeya, Mette Jeppesen, August Tómasson
- Simon Kvamm: Anton & Viktor, Thilde Steffensen, Jonas Thomsen

== Finalists ==
Key:

– Winner
– Runner-up

Act	Age(s)	Hometown	Mentor	Category	Result
Helene Frank	28	Eckernförde, Germany	Simon Kvamm	Over 23s	Winner
Selmani	19-22	Kalundborg	Simon Kvamm	Groups	Runner-up
Cristian Oprea	16	Sønderborg	Thomas Blachman	15-22s	3rd Place
Elva Wahlberg	20	Søborg	Oh Land	15-22s	4th Place
Kaos	20-21	Vordingborg og Valby	Thomas Blachman	Groups	5th Place
Cyklus	22	Næstved	Oh Land	Groups	6th Place
Mariya Apollonia	24	Copenhagen	Thomas Blachman	Over 23s	7th Place
Nicolaj Lindby	29	Aarhus	Oh Land	Over 23s	8th Place
Victor Hauch	19	Gentofte	Simon Kvamm	15-22s	9th Place

== Live shows ==
Colour key

–	Contestant was in the bottom two and had to sing again in the Sing-Off
–	Contestant received the fewest public votes and was immediately eliminated (no Sing-Off)
–	Contestant received the most public votes

Contestants' colour key:

– Oh Land's Contestants
– Thomas Blachman's Contestants
– Simon Kvamm's Contestants

Contestant	Week 1	Week 2	Week 3	Week 4	Week 5	Week 6	Week 7	
Contestant	Week 1	Week 2	Week 3	Week 4	Week 5	Week 6	1st round	2nd round
Helene Frank	Safe	Safe	Safe	Safe	Safe	Safe	Safe	Winner
Selmani	Safe	Safe	Safe	Safe	Safe	Safe	Safe	Runner-up
Cristian Oprea	Safe	Safe	Safe	Safe	Bottom two	Safe	3rd	Eliminated (Week 7)
Elva Wahlberg	Safe	Safe	Safe	Bottom two	Safe	4th	Eliminated (Week 6)	
Kaos	Safe	Safe	Bottom two	Safe	Bottom two	Eliminated (Week 5)		
Cyklus	Safe	Bottom two	Safe	Bottom two	Eliminated (Week 4)			
Mariya Apollonia	Safe	Safe	Bottom two	Eliminated (Week 3)				
Nicolaj Lindby	Bottom two	Bottom two	Eliminated (Week 2)					
Victor Hauch	Bottom two	Eliminated (Week 1)						
Sing-Off	Victor Hauch, Nicolaj Lindby	Cyklus, Nicolaj Lindby	Mariya Apollonia, Kaos	Elva Wahlberg, Cyklus	Cristian Oprea, Kaos	The act that received the fewest public votes was automatically eliminated.		
Blachman voted out	Victor Hauch	Nicolaj Lindby	Mariya Apollonia	Elva Wahlberg	Kaos	The act that received the fewest public votes was automatically eliminated.		
Oh Land voted out	Victor Hauch	Nicolaj Lindby	Kaos	Cyklus	Kaos	The act that received the fewest public votes was automatically eliminated.		
Kvamm voted out	Nicolaj Lindby	Cyklus	Mariya Apollonia	Cyklus	Cristian Oprea	The act that received the fewest public votes was automatically eliminated.		
Eliminated	Victor Hauch; 9th	Nicolaj Lindby; 8th	Mariya Apollonia; 7th	Cyklus; 6th	Kaos; 5th	Elva Wahlberg; 4th	Cristian Oprea; 3rd	Selmani; Runner-Up
Eliminated	Victor Hauch; 9th	Nicolaj Lindby; 8th	Mariya Apollonia; 7th	Cyklus; 6th	Kaos; 5th	Elva Wahlberg; 4th	Cristian Oprea; 3rd	Helene Frank; Winner

=== Week 1 (February 23) ===
- Theme: Signature

Contestants' performances on the first live show
Act	Order	Song	Result
Elva Wahlberg	1	"Vampire"	Safe
Victor Hauch	2	"Ibiza"	Bottom two
Mariya Apollonia	3	"Sundholm"	Safe
Nicolaj Lindby	4	"Verdens Mindste Dør, Har Aldrig Været Større"	Bottom two
Selmani	5	"Stå Op Gå Ned"	Safe
Cristian Oprea	6	"Halskæde"	Safe
Cyklus	7	"Fugle Kan Dø"	Safe
Helene Franck	8	"Et Hav Af Udstrakte Hænder"	Safe
Kaos	9	"Bums For Eliten"	Safe
Sing-Off details
Victor Hauch	1	"Susanne, Birgitte og Hanne"	Eliminated
Nicolaj Lindby	2	"You and I (We Can Conquer the World)"	Saved

Judges' votes to eliminate

- Kvamm: Nicolaj Lindby
- Oh Land: Victor Hauch
- Blachman: Victor Hauch

=== Week 2 (March 1) ===
- Theme: Songs from the 1980s

Contestants' performances on the second live show
Act	Order	Song	Result
Cristian Oprea	1	"99 Luftballons"	Safe
Cyklus	2	"I Would Die 4 U"	Bottom two
Helene Franck	3	"Sotto Voce"	Safe
Mariya Apollonia	4	"Nu Hvor Du Har Brændt Mig Af"	Safe
Nicolaj Lindby	5	"There Is a Light That Never Goes Out"	Bottom two
Kaos	6	"Indian Summer"	Safe
Elva Wahlberg	7	"I Wanna Dance with Somebody (Who Loves Me)"	Safe
Selmani	8	"Hele Verden Fra Forstanden"	Safe
Sing-Off details
Cyklus	1	"Venus"	Saved
Nicolaj Lindby	2	"The Second You Sleep"	Eliminated

Judges' votes to eliminate

- Kvamm: Cyklus
- Blachman: Nicolaj Lindby
- Oh Land: Nicolaj Lindby

=== Week 3 (March 8) ===
- Theme: International Women's Day
- Musical guest: Emma Sehested Høeg ("Aldrig Helt Nok")

Contestants' performances on the third live show
Act	Order	Song	Result
Mariya Apollonia	1	"Jeg elsker alt hvad du hader ved mig"	Bottom two
Selmani	2	"Landet"	Safe
Elva Wahlberg	3	"Killing It"	Safe
Kaos	4	"ægte kvinde"	Bottom two
Cyklus	5	"Alt Det Du Gør"	Safe
Cristian Oprea	6	"Run the World (Girls)"	Safe
Helene Franck	7	"Bitte Små Ryk"	Safe
Sing-Off details
Mariya Apollonia	1	"Somewhere Only We Know"	Eliminated
Kaos	2	"Slørede Nætter"	Saved

Judges' votes to eliminate

- Kvamm: Mariya Apollonia
- Oh Land: Kaos
- Blachman: Mariya Apollonia

=== Week 4 (March 15) ===
- Theme: TV & Movie songs

Contestants' performances on the fourth live show
Act	Order	Song	Movie/TV show	Result
Cyklus	1	"Nu Flyver Anton"	Anton	Bottom two
Helene Frank	2	"Sjæl i Flammer"	Een gang strømer...	Safe
Kaos	3	"Hvad Skal vi Med Frihed?"	Cirkeline: Storbyens Mus	Safe
Selmani	4	"Knokler Hårdt"	Ækte vare	Safe
Elva Wahlberg	5	"What Was I Made For?"	Barbie	Bottom two
Cristian Oprea	6	"Goodbye Yellow Brick Road"	Rocketman	Safe
Sing-Off details
Cyklus	1	"Sacre Coeur"		Eliminated
Elva Wahlberg	2	"The Game"		Saved

Judges' votes to eliminate

- Blachman: Elva Wahlberg
- Kvamm: Cyklus
- Oh Land: Cyklus

=== Week 5 (March 22) ===
- Theme: Family
- Group Performances: "Running in the Family" (performed by the top 5)
- Musical Guest: August Høyen ("Min Mor")

Contestants' performances on the fifth live show
Act	Order	Song	Result
Selmani	1	"Novembervej"	Safe
Cristian Oprea	2	"My Girls"	Bottom two
Helene Frank	3	"Natsværmer"	Safe
Kaos	4	"Klap for fædrelandet"	Bottom two
Elva Wahlberg	5	"Mother Mother"	Safe
Sing-Off details
Cristian Oprea	1	"Who Wants to Live Forever"	Saved
Kaos	2	"Kaos kan Være Smukt"	Eliminated

Judges' votes to eliminate

- Kvamm: Cristian Oprea
- Oh Land: Kaos
- Blachman: Kaos

=== Week 6: Semi-Final (March 29) ===
- Theme: Heart Rhymes with Pain
- Musical Guest: ROSÉL ("Igennem Din Mund")

Contestants' performances on the sixth live show
Act	Order	First song (Love Song)	Order	Second song (Unhappy Love Song)	Result
Helene Frank	1	"Sådan nogle som os"	5	"Termodragten"	Safe
Elva Wahlberg	2	"Svært at være fantastisk"	6	"Weak"	Eliminated
Selmani	3	"Du gør mig..."	7	"Regn"	Safe
Cristian Oprea	4	"Mystery of Love"	8	"This is what autumn feels like"	Safe

The semi-final did not feature a sing-off and instead the act with the fewest public votes, Elva Wahlberg was automacally eliminated. After Elva Wahlberg's elimination, she sang "20 år" which was her own single and will be released on the music streaming services.

=== Week 7: Final (April 5) ===
- Theme: Judges Choice, Duet with a Special Guest, Winner Song
- Musical Guest: Christopher ("Fool's Gold"), Astrid S ("Hurts So Good)" & ("First to Go"),
- Group Performances: "Arcade", "Orchid Field (original song)" & "Let Her Go" (performed by the 3 finalists), "Lionheart (Fearless)" (performed by the 9 live show contestants), "A Beautiful Life" (performed by Christopher & the 9 live show contestants), "This is Me" (performed by the audtionees)

Contestants' performances on the seventh live show
Act	Order	Judges Choice Song	Order	Duet song (special guest)	Result	Voting Result (Round 1)	Order	Winner Song	Result	Voting Result (Round 2)
Helene Frank	1	"Noget for nogen"	4	"Langt ude, langt oppe, langt nede og langt, langt væk" & "Du er" (with Søren Huss)	Safe	47,01% (1/3)	8	"Verden Findes"	Winner	69,11% (1/2)
Cristian Oprea	2	"(I Can't Get No) Satisfaction"	5	"Det’ kun vigtigt, hvad det er" & "Storebæltsbroen" (with Guldimund)	3rd Place	25,15% (3/3)	N/A (Already Eliminated)			
Selmani	3	"Terrier"	6	"Spice up your life" & "Første Dag" (with Benjamin Hav & Ella Augusta)	Safe	27,84% (2/3)	7	"Vejen Hjem"	Runner-up	30,89% (2/2)

After Cristian Oprea's elimination, he sang "Sang om forventninger (Jeg vil bare være glad)" which was his own single and will be released on the music streaming services.
