= X Factor (Danish TV series) season 14 =

X Factor
- Season 14
- Hosted by: Sofie Linde Ingversen (Auditions, 5 Chair Challenge & Bootcamp); Melvin Kakooza (Bootcamp); Lise Rønne (Live Shows)
- Judges: Thomas Blachman; Oh Land; Martin Jensen
- Winner: Solveig Lindelof
- Winning mentor: Oh Land
- Runner-up: Nikoline Steen Kristensen

Release
- Original network: TV2
- Original release: January 1 – April 9, 2021

Season chronology
- ← Previous; Season 13 Next → Season 15

X Factor is a Danish television music competition showcasing new singing talent. Like the end of season 13, season 14 continued live shows without audiences due to the COVID-19 pandemic. Solveig Lindelof won the season and Oh Land became the winning mentor for the first time and Solveig Lindelof became the first winner in the Danish X Factor history to appear in the bottom two.

== Judges and hosts ==
Thomas Blachman and Oh Land returned as judges for a 13th and third season respectively, while Ankerstjerne did not return for a third season. DJ Martin Jensen took over as judge from Ankerstjerne, introducing him to the competition for the first time.

For a sixth season, Sofie Linde Ingversen returned as the host of the show. Sofie hosted the auditions, the returning 5 Chair Challenge, and the Bootcamp. For the live shows, she would take maternity leave, appointing the hosting role to comedian Melvin Kakooza. In late February however, Melvin had a brain tumor, rendering him unable to host the show. Lise Rønne, the former host of seasons 1, 2, 4, and 5, agreed to replace Melvin as host of the show. She was hesitant initially but agreed by reason of circumstances.

== Selection process ==
Auditions took place in Copenhagen and Aarhus. Oh Land was assigned to mentor the 15-22s category, Martin Jensen the Over 23s, and Blachman the Groups.

The 15 successful acts were:

- 15-22s: Nikoline Steen Kristensen, Andreas Liebach, Solveig Lindelof, Lucca Nordlund, Julie Toftdal
- Over 23s: Hiba Chehade, Vilson Ferati, Julia Ingvarsson, Dan Laursen, Philip Lillelund
- Groups: Emmelie & Laura, Fox & Lilly, The Kubrix, Neva & Ida, Simon & Marcus

Kajsa, a group act advancing from the 5 Chair Challenge, withdrew from the competition voluntarily just before entering the Bootcamp stage.

=== Bootcamp ===
The 6 eliminated acts were:

- 15-22s: Andreas Liebach, Julie Toftdal
- Over 23s: Julia Ingvarsson, Philip Lillelund
- Groups: Emmelie & Laura, Fox & Lilly

== Contestants ==
Key:

– Winner
– Runner-up

Act	Age(s)	Hometown	Category (mentor)	Result
Solveig Lindelof	15	Hvidovre	15-22s (Oh Land)	Winner
Nikoline Steen Kristensen	17	Sørvad	15-22s (Oh Land)	Runner-up
Simon & Marcus	18-19	Thisted	Groups (Blachman)	3rd place
Lucca Nordlund	15	Aalborg	15-22s (Oh Land)	4th place
Dan Laursen	36	Haslev	Over 23s (Jensen)	5th place
The Kubrix	16-22	Various	Groups (Blachman)	6th place
Vilson Ferati	23	Langesø	Over 23s (Jensen)	7th place
Neva & Ida	17-18	Various	Groups (Blachman)	8th place
Hiba Chehade	26	Odense	Over 23s (Jensen)	9th place

== Live shows ==
Colour key

–	Contestant was in the bottom two and had to sing again in the Sing-Off
–	Contestant received the fewest public votes and was immediately eliminated (no Sing-Off)
–	Contestant received the most public votes
–	Contestant automatically safe. No public votes.

Contestants' colour key:

– Over 23s (Jensen's contestants)
– 15-22s (Oh Land's contestants)
– Groups (Blachman's contestants)

Contestant	Week 1	Week 2	Week 3	Week 4	Week 5	Week 6		Week 7	
Contestant	Week 1	Week 2	Week 3	Week 4	Week 5	1st round	2nd round	1st round	2nd round
Solveig Lindelof	Safe	5th 10.6%	3rd 16.4%	6th 13.6%	1st 23.0%	1st 24.2%	1st 29.2%	1st 36.0%	Winner; 52.7%
Nikoline Steen Kristensen	Safe	2nd 15.9%	1st 16.7%	2nd 16.2%	2nd 17.4%	4th 18.8%	2nd 26.8%	2nd 35.0%	Runner-up; 47.3%
Simon & Marcus	Safe	3rd 13.3%	2nd 16.5%	1st 17.1%	4th 15.6%	2nd 22.1%	3rd 23.3%	3rd 29.0%	Eliminated (Week 7)
Lucca Nordlund	Safe	1st 16,4%	4th 13.9%	3rd 15.5%	5th 15,5%	3rd 21.6%	4th 20.8%	Eliminated (Week 6)	
Dan Laursen	Safe	6th 10.3%	6th 11.2%	4th 14.7%	3rd 15.6%	5th 13.3%	Eliminated (Week 6)		
The Kubrix	Safe	4th 11.4%	5th 11.9%	5th 14.0%	6th 13.0%	Eliminated (Week 5)			
Vilson Ferati	Safe	7th 9.1%	8th 5.9%	7th 8.9%	Eliminated (Week 4)				
Neva & Ida	Safe	9th 4.5%	7th 7.5%	Eliminated (Week 3)					
Hiba Chehade	Safe	8th 8.5%	Eliminated (Week 2)						
Sing-Off	In the first live show, there is no elimination. Viewers can still vote, and the votes go on and are counted in the second live show, where the first elimination will take place.	Hiba Chehade, Neva & Ida	Neva & Ida, Vilson Ferati	Vilson Ferati, Solveig Lindelof	Lucca Nordlund, The Kubrix	The act that received the fewest public votes was automatically eliminated.			
Blachman voted out	In the first live show, there is no elimination. Viewers can still vote, and the votes go on and are counted in the second live show, where the first elimination will take place.	Hiba Chehade	Neva & Ida	Vilson Ferati	Lucca Nordlund	The act that received the fewest public votes was automatically eliminated.			
Oh Land voted out	In the first live show, there is no elimination. Viewers can still vote, and the votes go on and are counted in the second live show, where the first elimination will take place.	Hiba Chehade	-	Vilson Ferati	The Kubrix	The act that received the fewest public votes was automatically eliminated.			
Jensen voted out	In the first live show, there is no elimination. Viewers can still vote, and the votes go on and are counted in the second live show, where the first elimination will take place.	Neva & Ida	Neva & Ida	Solveig Lindelof	The Kubrix	The act that received the fewest public votes was automatically eliminated.			
Eliminated	In the first live show, there is no elimination. Viewers can still vote, and the votes go on and are counted in the second live show, where the first elimination will take place.	Hiba Chehade; 9th	Neva & Ida; 8th	Vilson Ferati; 7th	The Kubrix; 6th	Dan Laursen; 5th	Lucca Nordlund; 4th	Simon & Marcus; 3rd	Nikoline Steen Kristensen; Runner-up
Eliminated	In the first live show, there is no elimination. Viewers can still vote, and the votes go on and are counted in the second live show, where the first elimination will take place.	Hiba Chehade; 9th	Neva & Ida; 8th	Vilson Ferati; 7th	The Kubrix; 6th	Dan Laursen; 5th	Lucca Nordlund; 4th	Simon & Marcus; 3rd	Solveig Lindelof; Winner

=== Week 1 (February 26) ===
- Theme: Signature

Contestants' performances on the first live show
Act	Order	Song	Result
Solveig Lindelof	1	"Here Comes the Sun"	Safe
Simon & Marcus	2	"Hot Girl Bummer"	Safe
Dan Laursen	3	"Before You Go"	Safe
Nikoline Steen Kristensen	4	"Vi er ikke kønne nok"	Safe
Hiba Chehade	5	"Ocean Eyes"	Safe
The Kubrix	6	"Hallucinogenics"	Safe
Vilson Ferati	7	"Blinding Lights"	Safe
Neva & Ida	8	"Mad Hatter"	Safe
Lucca Nordlund	9	"Drivers License"	Safe

There was no elimination in the first live show. Viewers could still vote, and the votes would go on and be counted in the second live show.

=== Week 2 (March 5) ===
- Theme: Songs released in 2020

Contestants' performances on the second live show
Act	Order	Song	Result
Dan Laursen	1	"Higher Ground"	Safe
Nikoline Steen Kristensen	2	"Giv lys igen"	Safe
The Kubrix	3	"People, I've Been Sad"	Safe
Hiba Chehade	4	"You Should Be Sad"	Bottom two
Lucca Nordlund	5	"Fire on Fire"	Safe
Neva & Ida	6	"Mad at Disney"	Bottom two
Solveig Lindelof	7	"Please Don't Make Me Cry"	Safe
Vilson Ferati	8	"Lonely"	Safe
Simon & Marcus	9	"Bad Boy"	Safe
Sing-Off details
Hiba Chehade	1	"No Peace"	Eliminated
Neva & Ida	2	"Børn af Natten"	Saved

Judges' votes to eliminate

- Blachman: Hiba Chehade
- Jensen: Neva & Ida
- Oh Land: Hiba Chehade

=== Week 3 (March 12) ===
- Theme: Sound of my Childhood
- Musical Guest: Folkeklubben ("Børn af den tabte tid")

Contestants' performances on the third live show
Act	Order	Song	Result
Nikoline Steen Kristensen	1	"Joanna"	Safe
Neva & Ida	2	"Heathens"	Bottom two
Vilson Ferati	3	"Let Me Love You"	Bottom two
Solveig Lindelof	4	"Nobody wants to hear songs anymore"	Safe
Simon & Marcus	5	"Feel Good Inc."	Safe
Dan Laursen	6	"Tusind Stykke"	Safe
Lucca Nordlund	7	"New Love"	Safe
The Kubrix	8	"Yellow Flicker Beat"	Safe
Sing-Off details
Neva & Ida	1	"I Found"	Eliminated
Vilson Ferati	2	"Diamonds"	Saved

Judges' votes to eliminate

- Jensen: Neva & Ida
- Blachman: Neva & Ida
- Oh Land: was not required to vote

=== Week 4 (March 19) ===
- Theme: Summer
- Musical Guest: Lord Siva ("Solhverv") & ("Stjernerne")

Contestants' performances on the fourth live show
Act	Order	Song	Result
Simon & Marcus	1	"Walkin' on the Sun"	Safe
Lucca Nordlund	2	"Never Dreamed You'd Leave in Summer"	Safe
Nikoline Steen Kristensen	3	"Sunlight"	Safe
Vilson Ferati	4	"Wake Me Up"	Bottom two
The Kubrix	5	"National Anthem"	Safe
Solveig Lindelof	6	"Sun in our Eyes"	Bottom two
Dan Laursen	7	"Castle on the hill"	Safe
Sing-Off details
Vilson Ferati	1	"Pray"	Eliminated
Solveig Lindelof	2	"Once Upon a Time"	Saved

Judges' votes to eliminate

- Oh Land: Vilson Ferati
- Jensen: Solveig Lindelof
- Blachman: Vilson Ferati

=== Week 5 (March 26) ===
- Theme: Play Danish
- Group Performance: ("Føler mig selv 100")
- Musical Guest: Andreas Odbjerg ("I Morgen er en ny dag")

Contestants' performances on the fifth live show
Act	Order	Song	Result
Lucca Nordlund	1	"Island"	Bottom two
Simon & Marcus	2	"Hot!"	Safe
Solveig Lindelof	3	"Give You More"	Safe
Dan Laursen	4	"Over byen"	Safe
The Kubrix	5	"Mercy"	Bottom two
Nikoline Steen Kristensen	6	"Endeløst"	Safe
Sing-Off details
Lucca Nordlund	1	"Wicked Game"	Saved
The Kubrix	2	"Dead to Me"	Eliminated

Judges' votes to eliminate

- Blachman: Lucca Nordlund
- Oh Land: The Kubrix
- Jensen: The Kubrix

=== Week 6: Semi-Final (April 2) ===
- Theme: Horns & Unplugged
- Musical Guest: Alma Agger ("Uundgåelig")

Contestants' performances on the sixth live show
Act	Order	Horns Song	Result	Order	Unplugged Song	Result
Nikoline Steen Kristensen	1	"Nothing Breaks Like a Heart"	Safe	6	"Op"	Safe
Dan Laursen	2	"Giant"	Eliminated	N/A (Already Eliminated)		
Lucca Nordlund	3	"Love Lockdown"	Safe	7	"The Warning"	Eliminated
Simon & Marcus	4	"Rocket Scientist"	Safe	8	"Sunday Best"	Safe
Solveig Lindelof	5	"Shut Up"	Safe	9	"Heartbeat"	Safe

The semi-final did not feature a sing-off and instead the act with the fewest public votes, Dan Laursen received the fewest public votes in the first round and Lucca Nordlund received the fewest public votes in the second round and both were eliminated.

For the first time in the Danish X Factor two acts will be eliminated from the competition in the semi-finals.

=== Week 7: Final (April 9) ===
- Theme: Judges Choice, Duet with a Special Guest, Winner Song
- Musical Guest: Drew Sycamore ("Take it Back") & ("45 Fahrenheit Girl")
- Group Performance: "Move On Up" (Curtis Mayfield performed by the 9 contestants), "Folk skal bare holde deres kæft" (Hugorm performed by Hugorm & the 9 contestants)

Contestants' performances on the seventh live show
Act	Order	Judges Choice Song	Order	Duet song (with a Special Guest)	Order	Winner Song	Result
Simon & Marcus	1	"Sexy and I Know It"	4	"Mansion" & "Alene" with (Thor Farlov)	N/A (Already Eliminated)		3rd Place
Solveig Lindelof	2	"They Won't Go When I Go"	5	"Slip Away" & "Angel Zoo" with (Mads Bo)	8	"Cranes in the Sky"	Winner
Nikoline Steen Kristensen	3	"Fly Away"	6	"Nær" & "I et land uden høje bjerge" with (Michael Falch)	7	"Alle Tråde"	Runner-Up
