= X Factor (Danish TV series) season 19 =

X Factor
- Season 19
- Hosted by: Maria Fantino
- Judges: Thomas Blachman; Drew Sycamore; Benjamin Hav
- Winner: Hugo A
- Winning mentor: Benjamin Hav
- Runner-up: Hevi

Release
- Original network: TV2
- Original release: January 1 – April 10, 2026

X Factor is a Danish television music competition showcasing new singing talent. Maria Fantino returned as the host for her third season, while Thomas Blachman returned as a judge. Two new judges, Drew Sycamore and Benjamin Hav joined the panel this season, replacing Oh Land and Simon Kvamm, respectively.

On April 10, Hugo A was announced as the winner of the season, marking Benjamin Hav's first win as a mentor.

== Selection process ==
Auditions took place in Copenhagen and Aarhus.

The 18 successful acts were:

- Thomas Blachman: Tobias, Hevi, Rasmus, Jonas, Kram, Alfred og Jesper
- Drew Sycamore: Mikkel, Ella, Emelie, Malthe, Norm, Sara og Marie
- Benjamin Hav: Hugo, Sara, Jakob, Matilde, Fire Flotte Fyre, India og Viktoria

=== Bootcamp ===
The 9 eliminated acts were:

- Thomas Blachman: Tobias, Jonas, Kram
- Drew Sycamore: Mikkel, Malthe, Norm
- Benjamin Hav: Sara, Matilde, India og Viktoria

== Finalists ==
Key:

– Winner
– Runner-up

Act	Age(s)	Hometown	Mentor	Category	Result
Hugo A	16	Sønderborg	Benjamin Hav	15-22s	Winner
Hevi	15	Bording	Thomas Blachman	15-22s	Runner-up
Ella Sophia	18	Frederiksberg	Drew Sycamore	15-22s	3rd Place
Rasmus Djurhuus	28	Ballerup	Thomas Blachman	Over 23s	4th Place
Mli (Emelie Blomgren)	41	Holsted	Drew Sycamore	Over 23s	5th Place
Sara+Marie	19	Svendborg	Drew Sycamore	Groups	6th Place
44 m²	23-24	Copenhagen	Thomas Blachman	Groups	7th Place
4 Flotte Fyre	20	Various	Benjamin Hav	Groups	8th Place
Jakob Hasselstrøm	29	Copenhagen	Benjamin Hav	Over 23s	9th Place

== Live shows ==
Colour key

–	Contestant was in the bottom two and had to sing again in the Sing-Off
–	Contestant received the fewest public votes and was immediately eliminated (no Sing-Off)
–	Contestant received the most public votes

Contestants' colour key:

– Drew Sycamore's Contestants
– Thomas Blachman's Contestants
– Benjamin Hav's Contestants

Contestant	Week 1	Week 2	Week 3	Week 4	Week 5	Week 6	Week 7	
Contestant	Week 1	Week 2	Week 3	Week 4	Week 5	Week 6	1st round	2nd round
Hugo A	Safe	Safe	Safe	Safe	Safe	Safe	2nd 31,00%	Winner; 53,00%
Hevi	Safe	Safe	Safe	Safe	Safe	Safe	1st 39,00%	Runner-up; 47,00%
Ella Sophia	Safe	Safe	Safe	Safe	Safe	Safe	3rd 30,00%	Eliminated (Week 7)
Rasmus Djurhuus	Safe	Safe	Bottom two	Safe	Bottom two	4th	Eliminated (Week 6)	
Mli	Safe	Safe	Safe	Bottom two	Bottom two	Eliminated (Week 5)		
Sara+Marie	Safe	Safe	Safe	Bottom two	Eliminated (Week 4)			
44 m²	Bottom two	Bottom two	Bottom two	Eliminated (Week 3)				
4 Flotte Fyre	Safe	Bottom two	Eliminated (Week 2)					
Jakob Hasslestrøm	Bottom two	Eliminated (Week 1)						
Sing-Off	44 m², Jakob Hasselstrøm	44 m², 4 Flotte Fyre	44 m², Rasmus Djurhuus	Sara+Marie, Mli	Rasmus Djurhuus, Mli	The act that received the fewest public votes was automatically eliminated.		
Blachman voted out	Jakob Hasselstrøm	4 Flotte Fyre	44 m²	Mli	Mli	The act that received the fewest public votes was automatically eliminated.		
Sycamore voted out	Jakob Hasselstrøm	4 Flotte Fyre	Rasmus Djurhuus	Sara+Marie	Rasmus Djurhuus	The act that received the fewest public votes was automatically eliminated.		
Hav voted out	44 m²	44 m²	44 m²	Sara+Marie	Mli	The act that received the fewest public votes was automatically eliminated.		
Eliminated	Jakob Hasselstrøm; 9th	4 Flotte Fyre; 8th	44 m² 7th	Sara+Marie; 6th	Mli; 5th	Rasmus Djurhuus; 4th	Ella Sophia; 3rd	Hevi; Runner-Up
Eliminated	Jakob Hasselstrøm; 9th	4 Flotte Fyre; 8th	44 m² 7th	Sara+Marie; 6th	Mli; 5th	Rasmus Djurhuus; 4th	Ella Sophia; 3rd	Hugo A Winner

=== Week 1 (February 27) ===
- Theme: Signature

Contestants' performances on the first live show
Act	Order	Song	Result
44m²	1	"Jeg har ikke lyst til at dø"	Bottom two
Hugo A	2	"Always On My Mind"	Safe
Mli	3	"Bad Romance"	Safe
Hevi	4	"fake det."	Safe
Jakob Hasselstrøm	5	"Don't Know Why"	Bottom two
Sara+Marie	6	"No One Dies from Love"	Safe
Rasmus Djurhuus	7	"God's Gonna Cut You Down"	Safe
4 Flotte Fyre	8	"Kære Lille Mormor"	Safe
Ella Sophia	9	"You Stole the Show"	Safe
Sing-Off details
44m²	1	"Vi pumper hjertet op"	Saved
Jakob Hasselstrøm	2	"Ikke Mer' Mig"	Eliminated

Judges' votes to eliminate

- Hav: 44m²
- Sycamore: Jakob Hasselstrøm
- Blachman: Jakob Hasselstrøm

=== Week 2 (March 6) ===
- Theme: Hooray It's my birth year

Contestants' performances on the second live show
Act	Order	Song	Result
Ella Sophia	1	"Umbrella"	Safe
4 Flotte Fyre	2	"Fix You"	Bottom two
Rasmus Djurhuus	3	"Bitter Sweet Symphony"	Safe
Mli	4	"Forever Young"	Safe
44m²	5	"Tag mig tilbage"	Bottom two
Sara+Marie	6	"Put Your Records On"	Safe
Hevi	7	"Lost in the World"	Safe
Hugo A	8	"Home"	Safe
Sing-Off details
4 Flotte Fyre	1	"Sh-Boom"	Eliminated
44m²	2	"er det nu?"	Saved

Judges' votes to eliminate

- Hav: 44m²
- Sycamore: 4 Flotte Fyre
- Blachman: 4 Flotte Fyre

=== Week 3 (March 13) ===
- Theme: Trip goes to

Contestants' performances on the third live show
Act	Order	Song	Result
Ella Sophia	1	"Umbrella"	Safe
44m²	2	"Nordvest altaner"	Bottom two
Mli	3	"Barn Af Venedig"	Safe
Rasmus Djurhuus	4	"Walk on the Wild Side"	Bottom two
Ella Sophia	5	"Empire State of Mind (Part II)"	Safe
Hugo A	6	"Pianomand"	Safe
Sara+Marie	7	"End of Beginning"	Safe
Sing-Off details
44m²	1	"Ik Gå Så Langt"	Eliminated
Rasmus Djurhuus	2	"All These Nights"	Saved

Judges' votes to eliminate

- Hav: 44m²
- Sycamore: Rasmus Djurhuus
- Blachman: 44m²

=== Week 4 (March 20) ===
- Theme: The year that passed 2025
- Musical Guest: Annika ("Livsforladt")

Contestants' performances on the fourth live show
Act	Order	Song	Result
Sara+Marie	1	"12 to 12"	Bottom two
Rasmus Djurhuus	2	"Gold"	Safe
Hugo A	3	"Yukon"	Safe
Ella Sophia	4	"Blodigt"	Safe
Hevi	5	"Hader ik mig selv sammen med dig"	Safe
Mli	6	"Billions"	Bottom two
Sing-Off details
Sara+Marie	1	"Green Light"	Eliminated
Mli	2	"It Must Have Been Love"	Saved

Judges' votes to eliminate

- Hav: Sara+Marie
- Sycamore: Sara+Marie
- Blachman: Mli

=== Week 5 (March 27) ===
- Theme: Play something Medina
- Musical Guest: Medina ("Se Mig Nu")

Contestants' performances on the fifth live show
Act	Order	Song	Result
Rasmus Djurhuus	1	"Giv mig alt"	Bottom two
Ella Sophia	2	"Elsk Mig"	Safe
Hugo A	3	"Vi to"	Safe
Mli	4	"Love Isn't Easy"	Bottom two
Hevi	5	"Lykkepille"	Safe
Sing-Off details
Rasmus Djurhuus	1	"Chains"	Saved
Mli	2	"Highwomen"	Eliminated

Judges' votes to eliminate

- Hav: Mli
- Sycamore: Rasmus Djurhuus
- Blachman: Mli

=== Week 6: Semi-Final (April 3) ===
- Theme: Body & Soul

Contestants' performances on the sixth live show
Act	Order	First song	Order	Second song	Result
Hugo A	1	"Give It Up"	5	"Earth Song"	Safe
Hevi	2	"Oscar Winning Tears"	6	"Vil du noget?"	Safe
Ella Sophia	3	"Det' kun vigtigt, hvad der er"	7	"Locked out of Heaven"	Safe
Rasmus Djurhuus	4	"Pissoir"	8	"Tak for dit brev"	Eliminated

The semi-final did not feature a sing-off and instead the act with the fewest public votes, Rasmus Djurhuus was automacally eliminated. After Rasmus Djurhuus's elimination, he sang "Brave Enough" which was his own single and will be released on the music streaming services.

=== Week 7: Final (April 10) ===
- Theme: Free Choice Song, Duet with a Special Guest, Winner Song
- Musical Guest: Christopher ("Ham med guitaren")
- Group Performances: "Stolt" (performed by the 9 live show contestants), "Golden" (performed by the Auditonees), "Den danske sommer" (Performed by Tobias Rahim and Birthe Kjær)

Contestants' performances on the seventh live show
Act	Order	Free Choice Song	Order	Duet song (special guest)	Result	Voting stats	Order	Winner Song	Result	Voting stats
Ella Sophia	1	"Hello"	4	"Oh My God"/"Gosh I Luv It !!!" (with Saint Clara)	3rd Place	30.00% (3/3)	N/A (Already Eliminated)			
Hugo A	2	"Thriller"	5	"Ready To Die"/"Afterall" (with Saveus)	Safe	31.00% (2/3)	8	"Golden 24"	Winner	53.00% (1/2)
Hevi	3	"Elsker dig for evigt"	6	"Kendt mig en uge"/"Tusind tanker!" (with Mille)	Safe	39.00% (1/3)	7	"Ender Her Igen"	Runner-up	47.00% (2/2)

After Ella Sophia's elimination, she sang "Vægtløs" which was her own single and will be released on the music streaming services.
