= X Factor (Danish TV series) season 2 =

Season of television series

X Factor
- Season 2
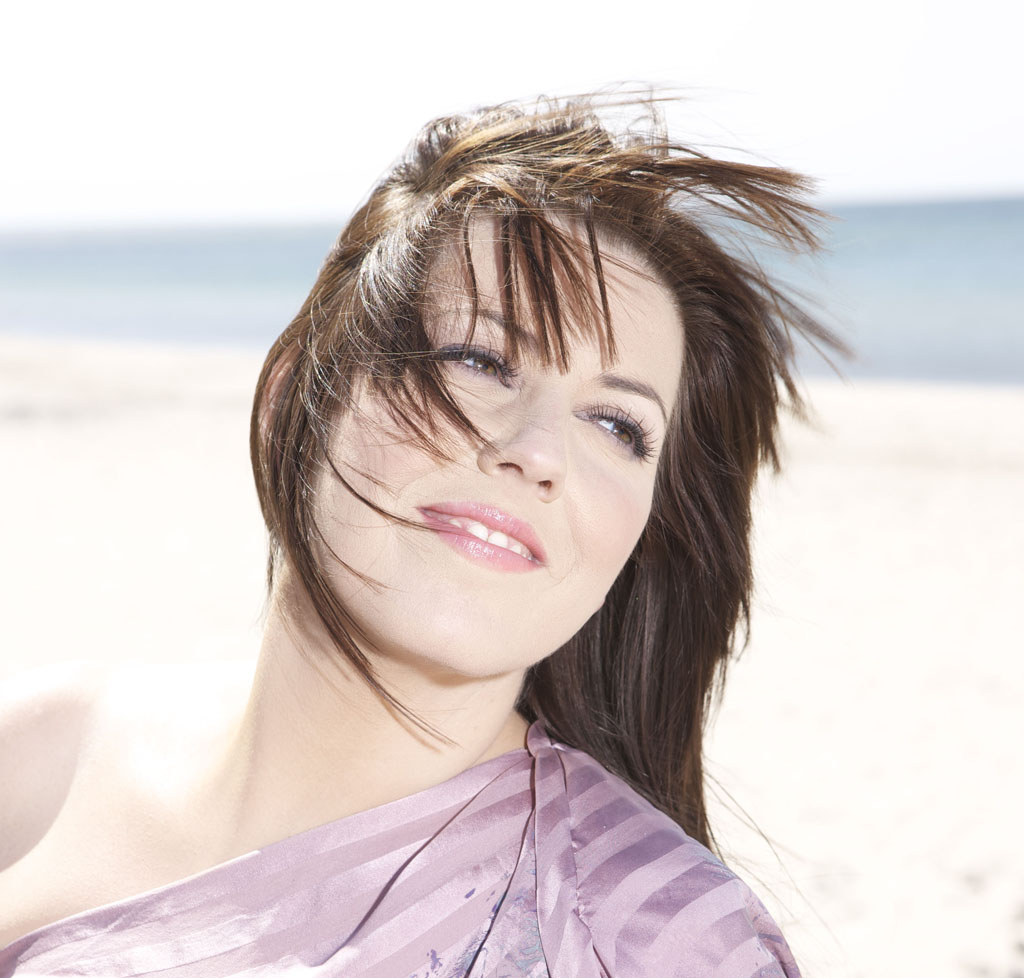
- Hosted by: Lise Rønne
- Judges: Thomas Blachman; Lina Rafn; Remee
- Winner: Linda Andrews
- Winning mentor: Lina Rafn
- Runner-up: Alien Beat Club
- Finals venue: DR Byen

Release
- Original network: DR1
- Original release: 2 January – 27 March 2009

Season chronology
- ← Previous; Season 1 Next → Season 3

X Factor is a Danish television music competition to find new singing talent. The second season premiered on 2 January 2009 and ended on 27 March on DR1. Lise Rønne returned as host, while Thomas Blachman, Lina Rafn and Remee returned as judges.

== Judges and hosts ==
Season 2 judges

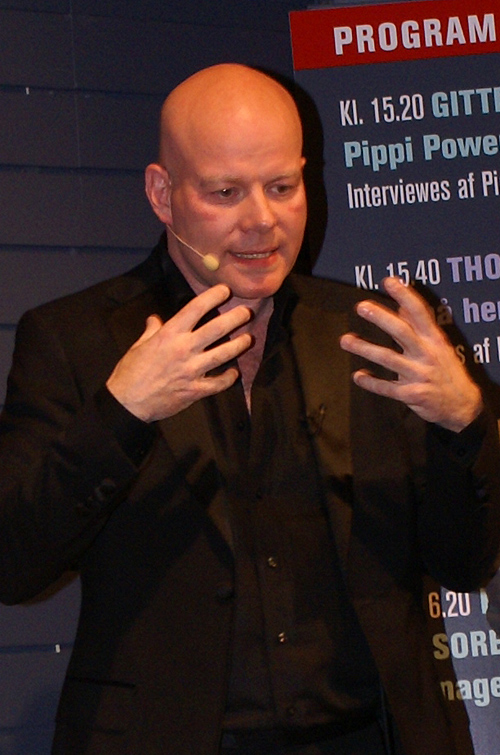
Thomas Blachman

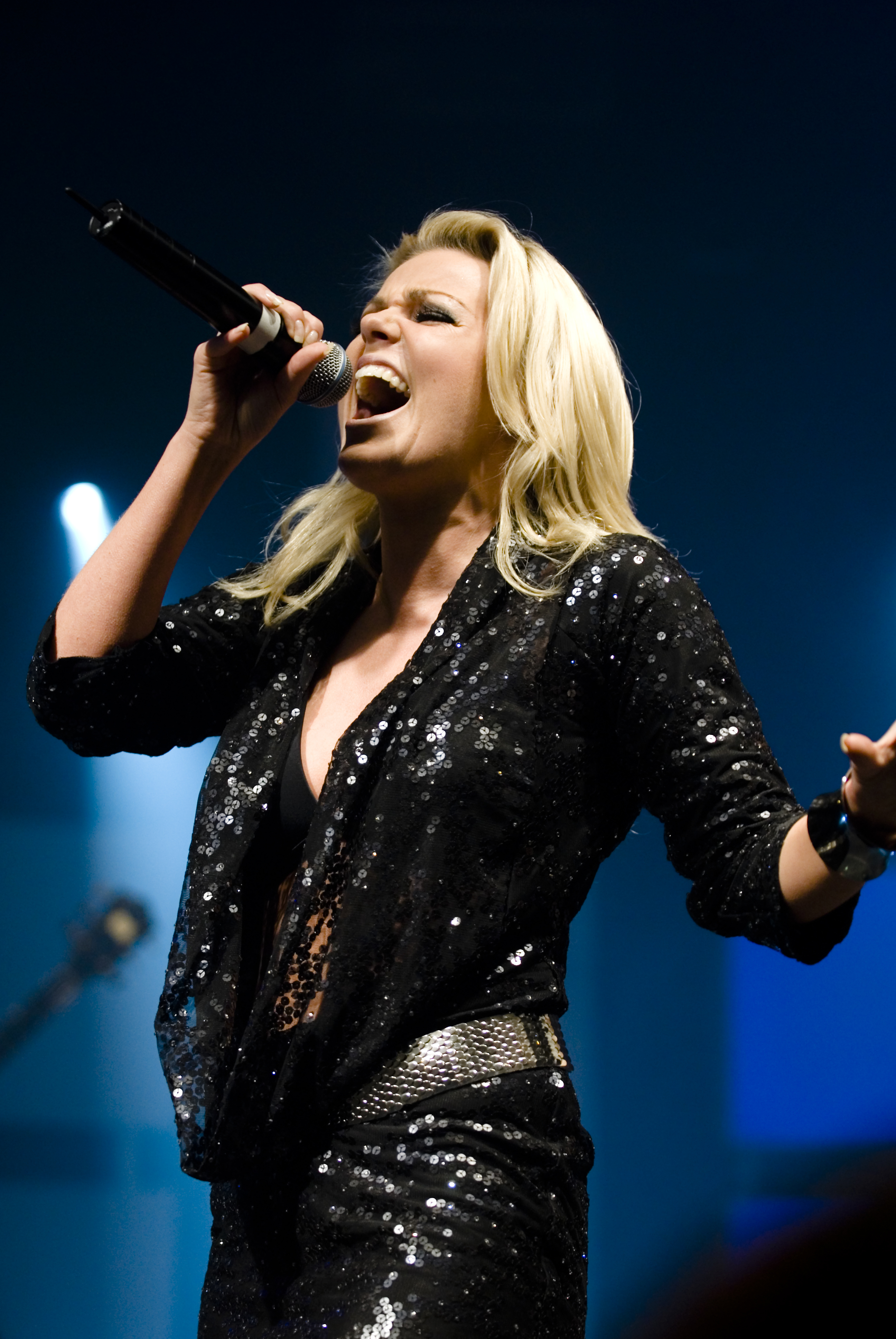
Lina Rafn

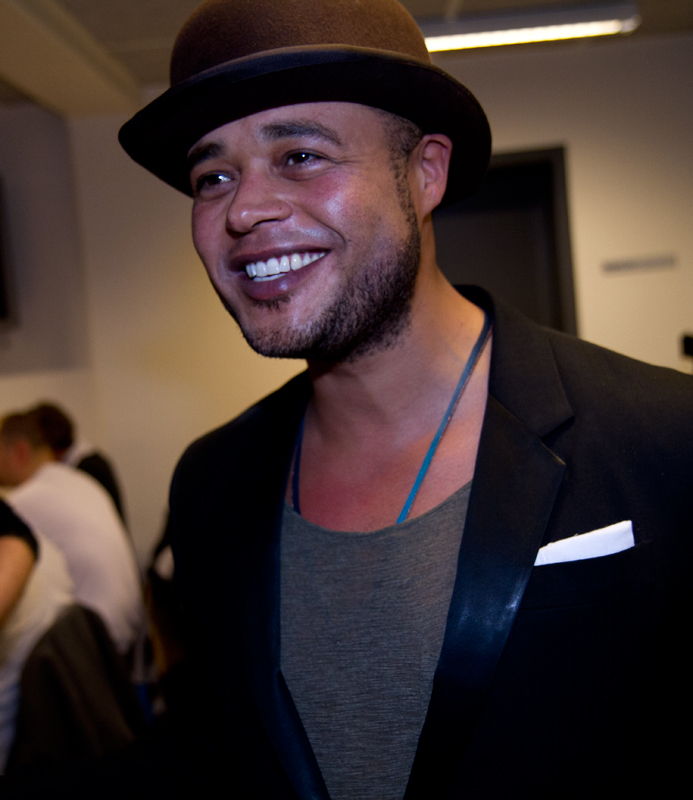
Remee

In March 2008, Thomas Blachman announced that he would not be returning as a judge for season 2. On 18 September 2008, Ekstra Bladet revealed that Lina Rafn would be returning as a judge for season 2. The following day, it was officially confirmed that Blachman, Rafn and Remee would all be returning as judges for season 2. Lise Rønne returned as host.

== Selection process ==
=== Auditions ===
Auditions took place in Copenhagen and Århus in 2008.

=== Superbootcamp ===
Remee was given the Groups category, Rafn was given the Over 25s and Blachman was given the 15-24s.

=== Bootcamp ===
For the first time in the show's history, the judges had an assistant to help them decide which acts to send through to the live shows. Remee was assisted by Martin Dodd, but Rafn and Blachman were not assisted.

The 6 eliminated acts were:

- 15-24s: Patricia (put into Alien Beat Club), Patrick
- Over 25s: Janus, Lotus
- Groups: Anders & Elisabeth, Soul Connect

== Contestants ==
Key:

– Winner
– Runner-up

Act	Age(s)	Hometown	Category (mentor)	Result
Linda Andrews	36	Tórshavn, Faroe Islands	Over 25s (Rafn)	Winner
Alien Beat Club	16-24	Various	Groups (Remee)	Runner-up
Mohamed Ali	16	Nørresundby	15-24s (Blachman)	3rd place
Sidsel Vestertjele	17	Unknown	15-24s (Blachman)	4th place
Lucas Claver	16	Hundested	15-24s (Blachman)	5th place
Asian Sensation	16-18	Aarhus	Groups (Remee)	6th place
Seest Christensen	35	Unknown	Over 25s (Rafn)	7th place
Claus Lillelund	31	Aalborg	Over 25s (Rafn)	8th place
Tårnhøj	25-31	Various	Groups (Remee)	9th place

== Live shows ==
The live shows began on 13 February 2009 and ended on 27 March 2009 at DR Byen.

Colour key:

– Contestant was in the bottom two and had to sing again in the final showdown
– Contestant received the fewest public votes and was immediately eliminated (no final showdown)

Contestants' colour key:

– Rafn's contestants (Over 25s)
– Remee's contestants (Groups)
– Blachman's contestants (15-24s)

Contestant	Week 1	Week 2	Week 3	Week 4	Week 5	Week 6	Final Week 7	
Contestant	Week 1	Week 2	Week 3	Week 4	Week 5	Week 6	Round 1	Round 2
Linda Andrews	Safe	Safe	Safe	Safe	Safe	Safe	Safe	Winner (Week 7)
Alien Beat Club	Safe	Safe	Safe	Safe	Safe	Safe	Safe	Runner-up (Week 7)
Mohamed Ali	Safe	Safe	Safe	Safe	Bottom two	Bottom two	3rd	Eliminated (Week 7)
Sidsel Vestertjele	Safe	Safe	Safe	Bottom two	Safe	Bottom two	Eliminated (Week 6)	
Lucas Claver	Safe	Bottom two	Safe	Safe	Bottom two	Eliminated (Week 5)		
Asian Sensation	Safe	Safe	Bottom two	Bottom two	Eliminated (Week 4)			
Seest Christensen	Safe	Safe	Bottom two	Eliminated (Week 3)				
Claus Lillelund	Bottom two	Bottom two	Eliminated (Week 2)					
Tårnhøj	Bottom two	Eliminated (Week 1)						
Bottom two	Claus Lillelund; Tårnhøj	Claus Lillelund; Lucas Claver	Asian Sensation; Seest Christensen	Asian Sensation; Sidsel Vestertjele	Lucas Claver; Mohamed Ali	Sidsel Vestertjele; Mohamed Ali	No bottom two, public votes alone decide who is eliminated.	
Remee voted out	Claus Lillelund	Claus Lillelund	Seest Christensen	Sidsel Vestertjele	Lucas Claver	No judges votes the public votes decides who will go through	No bottom two, public votes alone decide who is eliminated.	
Rafn voted out	Tårnhøj	Lucas Claver	Asian Sensation	Asian Sensation	Mohamed Ali	No judges votes the public votes decides who will go through	No bottom two, public votes alone decide who is eliminated.	
Blachman voted out	Tårnhøj	Claus Lillelund	Seest Christensen	Asian Sensation	Lucas Claver	No judges votes the public votes decides who will go through	No bottom two, public votes alone decide who is eliminated.	
Eliminated	Tårnhøj; 9th	Claus Lillelund; 8th	Seest Christensen; 7th	Asian Sensation; 6th	Lucas Claver; 5th	Sidsel Vestertjele; 4th	Mohamed Ali; 3rd	Alien Beat Club; Runner-up
Eliminated	Tårnhøj; 9th	Claus Lillelund; 8th	Seest Christensen; 7th	Asian Sensation; 6th	Lucas Claver; 5th	Sidsel Vestertjele; 4th	Mohamed Ali; 3rd	Linda Andrews; Winner

Note 1: In the semifinal the two acts who received the most votes from the Danish public will automatically progress to the final. The two acts with the fewest votes will sing again in the final showdown and then the public decides who will go through to the final.

=== Live show details ===
Colour key:

– Contestant was in the bottom two and had to sing again in the final showdown
– Contestant was eliminated
– Contestant was saved by the public

==== Week 1 (13 February) ====
- Theme: Hits

Contestants' performances on the first live show
Act	Order	Song	Result
Asian Sensation	1	"Stayin' Alive"	Safe
Seest Christensen	2	"Wonderful World"	Safe
Mohamed Ali	3	"1 Thing"	Safe
Claus Lillelund	4	"Ordinary People"	Bottom two
Tårnhøj	5	"Uninvited"	Eliminated
Lucas Claver	6	"Tainted Love"	Safe
Linda Andrews	7	"Because of You"	Safe
Alien Beat Club	8	"Warwick Avenue"	Safe
Sidsel Vestertjele	9	"Nothing Else Matters"	Safe

Judges' votes to eliminate

- Remee: Claus Lillelund
- Rafn: Tårnhøj
- Blachman: Tårnhøj

==== Week 2 (20 February) ====
- Theme: Made in Denmark

Contestants' performances on the second live show
Act	Order	Song	Result
Lucas Claver	1	"Hvorfor er lykken så lunefuld"	Bottom two
Alien Beat Club	2	"Dig og mig"/"Calabria"	Safe
Linda Andrews	3	"Vårvise"	Safe
Sidsel Vestertjele	4	"Rocket Brothers"	Safe
Asian Sensation	5	"Elsker hende mere"	Safe
Claus Lillelund	6	"Kys det nu"	Eliminated
Mohamed Ali	7	"Det er sent nu"	Safe
Seest Christensen	8	"Transparent and glasslike"	Safe

Judges' votes to eliminate

- Blachman: Claus Lillelund
- Rafn: Lucas Claver
- Remee: Claus Lillelund

==== Week 3 (27 February) ====
- Theme: Motown

Contestants' performances on the third live show
Act	Order	Song	Result
Linda Andrews	1	"You Can't Hurry Love"	Safe
Sidsel Vestertjele	2	"What Becomes of the Brokenhearted"	Safe
Asian Sensation	3	"Dancing in the Street"	Bottom two
Seest Christensen	4	"Lately"	Eliminated
Lucas Claver	5	"Baby Love"	Safe
Alien Beat Club	6	"I'll Be There"	Safe
Mohamed Ali	7	"I Want You Back"	Safe

Judges' votes to eliminate

- Remee: Seest Christensen
- Rafn: Asian Sensation
- Blachman: Seest Christensen

==== Week 4 (6 March) ====
- Theme: Songs by ABBA

Contestants' performances on the fourth live show
Act	Order	Song	Result
Alien Beat Club	1	"Voulez-Vous"	Safe
Sidsel Vestertjele	2	"Knowing Me, Knowing You"	Bottom two
Mohamed Ali	3	"SOS"	Safe
Asian Sensation	4	"One Night in Bangkok"	Eliminated
Linda Andrews	5	"Money, Money, Money"	Safe
Lucas Claver	6	"Does Your Mother Know"	Safe

Judges' votes to eliminate

- Remee: Sidsel Vestertjele
- Blachman: Asian Sensation
- Rafn: Asian Sensation

==== Week 5 (13 March) ====
- Theme: DR Bigband

Contestants' performances on the fifth live show
Act	Order	Song	Result
Mohamed Ali	1	"Crazy in Love"	Bottom two
Lucas Claver	2	"The Love Cats"	Eliminated
Linda Andrews	3	"Mercy"	Safe
Sidsel Vestertjele	4	"How?"	Safe
Alien Beat Club	5	"Toxic"	Safe

Judges' votes to eliminate

- Remee: Lucas Claver
- Rafn: Mohamed Ali
- Blachman: Lucas Claver

==== Week 6: Semi-final (20 March) ====
- Theme: Songs by Sanne Salomonsen; Dedication
- Musical Guest: Sanne Salomonsen ("Hel Igen")

Contestants' performances on the sixth live show
Act	Order	First song	Order	Second song	Result
Sidsel Vestertjele	1	"Kærligheden Kalder"	6	"Tom's Diner"	Eliminated
Alien Beat Club	2	"Taxa"	5	"I'm Yours"	Safe
Linda Andrews	3	"Hvis Du Forstod"	8	"Unwritten"	Safe
Mohamed Ali	4	"Efter Festen"	7	"Dirty Diana"	Bottom two

In this semi-final the two acts with the fewest votes will sing again in the final showdown and then the public decides who will go through to the final.

==== Week 7: Final (27 March) ====
Contestants' performances on the seventh live show
Act	Order	First song	Order	Second song	Result
Mohamed Ali	1	"If You're Not the One"/"Hot n Cold"	N/A	N/A (Already eliminated)	3rd Place
Alien Beat Club	2	"Circle of Life"/"Just Dance"	5	"Det bedste til sidst"	Runner-up
Linda Andrews	3	"So What"	4	"Det bedste til sidst"	Winner
