= Helene Frank =

Danish singer

- Born: 1996 or 1997; Eckernförde, Germany
- Origin: Eckernförde, Germany
- Genres: Pop
- Occupation: Singer
- Instrument: Vocals
- Years active: 2024–present
- Labels: Universal Music Group

Helene Frank (Born either 1996 or 1997), is a German singer. She is the winner of the Seventeenth season of the Danish version of the X Factor.

== Performances during X Factor ==
Episode	Theme	Song	Artist	Result
Audition	Free choice	"Arcade"	Duncan Laurence	Through to 6 Chair Challenge
6 Chair Challenge	Free choice	"Under Din Sne"	The Minds of 99	Through to bootcamp
Bootcamp	Free choice	"Giv Os Lyset Tilbage"	Ramsus Skov	Through to live shows
Live show 1	Signature	"Et Hav Af Udstræke Hænder"	Søren Huss	Safe
Live show 2	Songs from the 1980s	"Sotto voce"	Elisabeth	Safe
Live show 3	International Women's Day	"Bitte Små Ryk"	Tina Dickow	Safe
Live show 4	TV & Movie Songs	"Sjæl I Flammer"	Kasper Winding	Safe
Live show 5	Family	"Natsværmer"	Lars H.U.G.	Safe
Live show 6 – Semi-final	Heart Rhymes with Pain	"Sådan nogen som os"	Poul Krebs	Safe
Live show 6 – Semi-final	Heart Rhymes with Pain	"Termodragten"	Mouritz/Hørslev Projektet	Safe
Live show 7 – Final	Judge's Choice	"Noget for nogen"	Pauline	Safe (1st)
Live show 7 – Final	Duet with a Special Guest	"Langt ude, langt oppe, langt nede og langt, langt væk"/"Du er " with (Søren Huss)	Søren Huss	Safe (1st)
Live show 7 – Final	Winner's song	"Verden Findes"	Helene Frank	Winner

== Discography ==
List of singles, with selected chart positions
Title	Year	Peak chart positions	Album
Title	Year	DEN	Album
"Verden Findes"	2024	40	Non-album single

Preceded by ROSÉL	X Factor (Denmark) winner 2024	Succeeded by Leslie
