= Leslie Nguyen =

Danish singer

- Born: 2003 or 2004 (age 21); Esbjerg, Denmark
- Genres: Pop
- Occupation: Singer
- Instrument: Vocals
- Years active: 2025–present
- Label: Universal Music Group

Leslie Nguyen (Born either 2003 or 2004), is a Danish singer. She is the winner of the Eighteenth season of the Danish version of the X Factor.

== Performances during X Factor ==
Episode	Theme	Song	Artist	Result
Audition	Free choice	"How to Love"	Lil Wayne	Through to 6 Chair Challenge
6 Chair Challenge	Free choice	"Hjerter på Gaden"	Aphaca	Through to bootcamp
Bootcamp	Free choice	"Føles Godt"	URO Feat. Mekdes	Through to live shows
Live show 1	Signature	"Benhård"	Yör	Safe
Live show 2	The Latest top 10 hits from 2024/25	"Mellem mor og far"	Ida Laurberg	Safe
Live show 3	Songs from the 1990's	"What's Up?"	4 Non Blondes	Safe
Live show 4	Copenhagen	"Mucki bar"	Tobias Rahim	Safe
Live show 5	Let's Dance	"Giv mig alt"	Medina	Safe
Live show 6 – Semi-final	Dur & Mol	"Motion Sickness"	Phoebe Bridgers	Safe
Live show 6 – Semi-final	Dur & Mol	"The Scientist"	Coldplay	Safe
Live show 7 – Final	Judge's Choice	"Fast Car"	Tracy Chapman	Safe (1st)
Live show 7 – Final	Duet with a Special Guest	"Et sted hvor vi de første"/"Smelter under månen" with (Aphaca)	Aphaca	Safe (1st)
Live show 7 – Final	Winner's song	"Kig op"	Leslie	Winner

== Discography ==
List of singles, with selected chart positions
Title	Year	Peak chart positions	Album
Title	Year	DEN	Album
"Kig op"	2025	TBA	Non-album single
"What's Up"	2025	TBA	Non-album single

Preceded by Helene Frank	X Factor (Denmark) winner 2025	Succeeded by TBA
