= Lise Rønne =

Danish journalist and television presenter (born 1978)

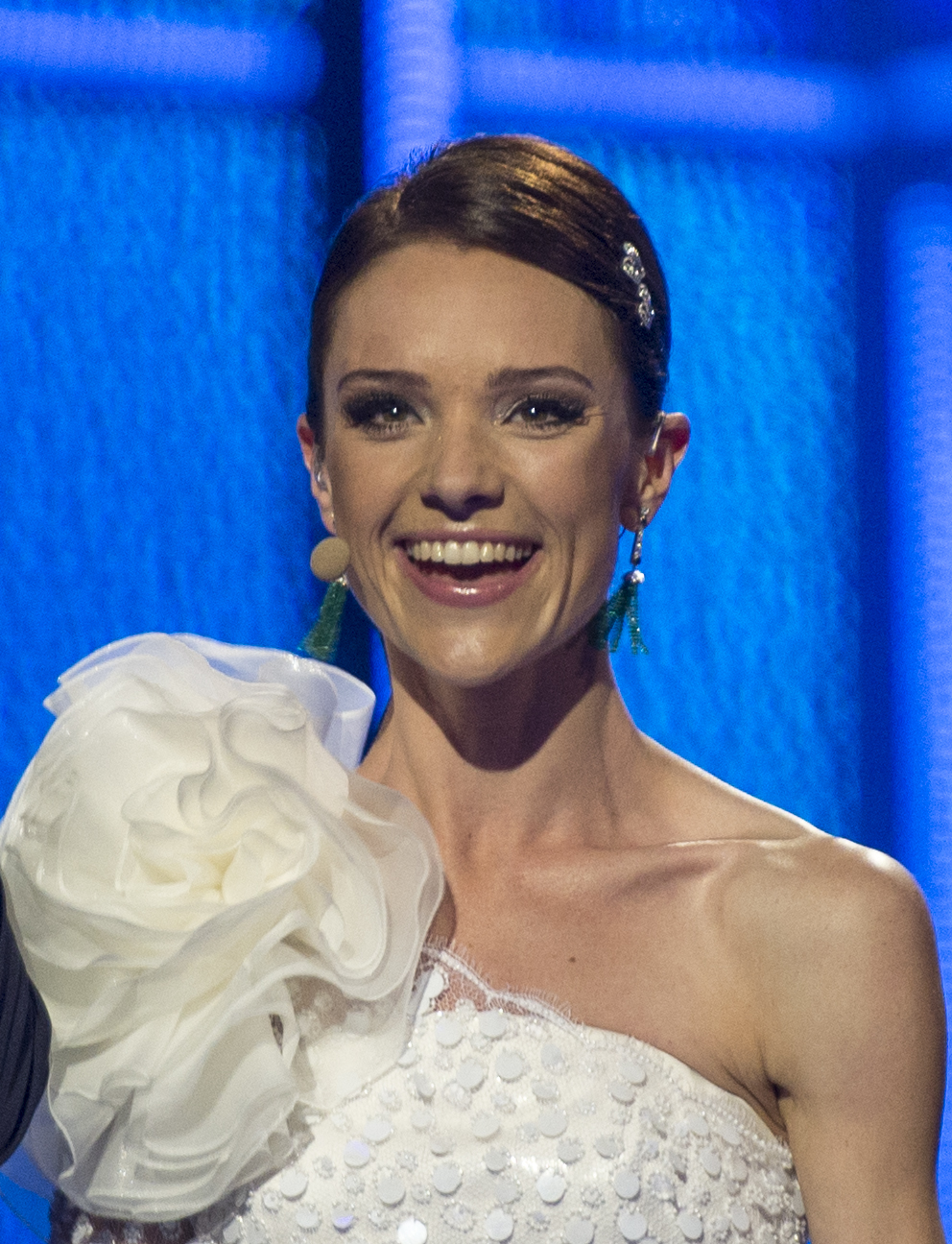
- Rønne presenting the Eurovision Song Contest in 2014
- Born: 1 November 1978 (age 47); Viborg, Denmark
- Occupations: Journalist, television presenter
- Years active: 2002–present
- Employer: Danmarks Radio
- Known for: Hosting X Factor and the Eurovision Song Contest 2014
- Partner: Mikkel Lucas Overby
- Children: 2

Lise Rønne (born 1 November 1978) is a Danish journalist and television presenter, best known in Denmark for presenting four seasons of X Factor as well as two seasons of Dansk Melodi Grand Prix. She is best known outside Denmark for presenting the Eurovision Song Contest in 2014.

== Education ==
Rønne attended Viborg Katedralskole, graduating in 1997 to pursue a bachelor's degree in media studies from Aarhus University and a diploma in journalism.

== Career ==
Rønne began her journalistic career at the age of 22, as a production assistant on MTV in London. On returning to Denmark, she began presenting shows such as Boogie, Dagens Danmark and Ungefair on DR1 and Rundfunk on TV 2.

In 2005, Rønne was offered the chance to replace Andrea Elisabeth Rudolph as co-presenter of TV 2's Vild med dans, but rejected the offer in order to pursue a journalistic career at Danmarks Radio (DR), working for TV Avisen alongside Dagens Danmark on 1 January 2006, before joining the team behind DR1's Aftenshowet on 1 January 2007. Having worked initially as a researcher and reporter, Rønne was appointed editor of the show on 1 August 2007, and first stood in for regular presenter Louise Wolff on 3 March 2008.

She has hosted four seasons of X Factor: 2008, 2009, 2011 and 2012, but announced on 8 March 2012 that the fifth series of the show in 2012 would be her last as host.

Rønne worked as editor of Fakten og Livsstil for DR Medier between 2011 and 2013, before leaving DR in 2012 to become a freelancer. DR announced on 22 May 2015 that she would return to DR as the regular presenter of Aftenshowet from 1 August.

Rønne also presented DR's annual fundraising initiative Danmarks Indsamling on 6 February 2016 alongside Ulla Essendrop.

=== Eurovision Song Contest ===
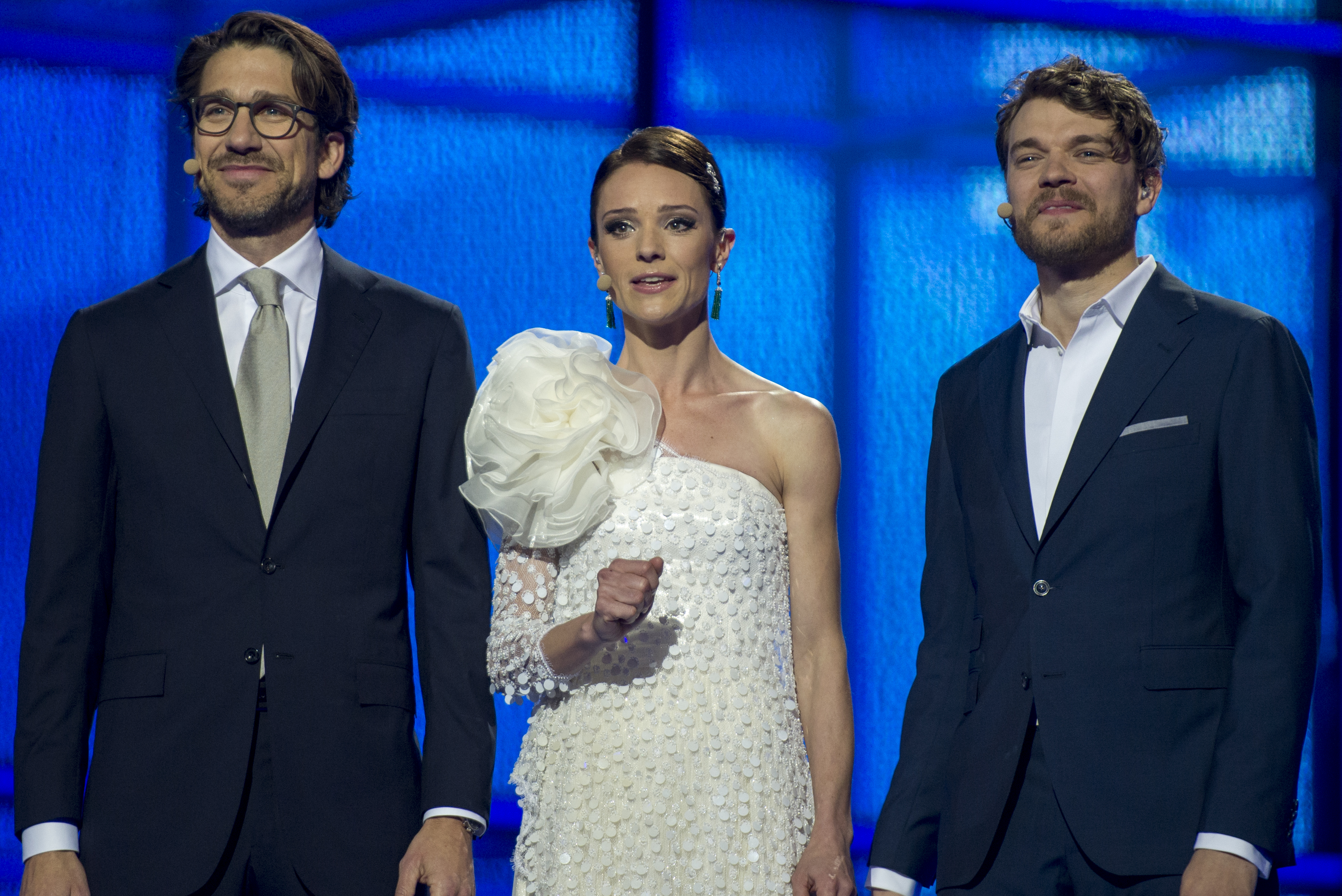
Nikolaj Koppel, Lise Rønne and Pilou Asbæk during the first dress rehearsal of the first semi-final of the Eurovision Song Contest 2014.

Rønne was the Danish spokesperson at the 2011 Contest, announcing the results of the combined Danish jury and public vote.

She has also presented two editions of Dansk Melodi Grand Prix: in 2011 alongside Felix Smith and in 2013 alongside Sofie Lassen-Kahlke and Louise Wolff.

DR announced on 4 February 2014 that Rønne would present the 2014 Contest in Copenhagen alongside Pilou Asbæk and Nikolaj Koppel.

== Personal life ==
Rønne has been in a relationship with Mikkel Lucas Overby since the end of 2008. The couple live in a townhouse in Østerbro, just north of Copenhagen, with their two children, a boy called Nelson (born 18 March 2010) and a girl called Eva (born 5 September 2012). She has previously been linked with actor Rune Tolsgaard and journalist Nikolaj Thomassen.

Rønne is also an ambassador for the Danish Refugee Council. In October 2015, she travelled to Lebanon with fellow ambassador Jesper Christensen to witness first-hand how the organisation helps Syrian refugees in the country.

== Filmography ==
=== Television ===
Year	Title	Channel	Role
2002-03, 2008–09	Boogie	DR1	Presenter
2003	Zulu bingo	TV 2	Presenter (as Boogie-Lise)
2003	Det store juleshow	DR1	Presenter
2004	Danish Music Awards	TV 2	Presenter (Årets danske cover)
2004	Rundfunk	TV 2	Presenter
2004	Kongeligt bryllup	TV 2	Reporter
2004	Bryllupsfeber – 3 dage i maj	TV 2	Reporter
2005	Clement direkte med Clement Kjersgaard	DR2	Writer
2005	Ungefair	DR1	Presenter
2006	Dagens Danmark	DR1	Presenter
2008	Joachim og Marie	DR1	Reporter
2008	aHA!	DR1	Guest
2008	Danmarks Indsamling	DR1	Presenter (live from Øksnehallen)
2008-09, 2011–12	X Factor	DR1	Presenter
2008-09, 2011–12, 2014-present	Aftenshowet	DR1	Presenter
2011	Dansk Melodi Grand Prix	DR1	Presenter (alongside Felix Smith)
2011	Eurovision Song Contest 2011	DR1	Danish spokesperson
2012	Her er dit liv	DR1	Presenter
2012	Zulu Awards 2012 - Den røde løber	TV 2 Zulu	Presenter
2013	Dansk Melodi Grand Prix	DR1	Presenter (alongside Sofie Lassen-Kahlke and Louise Wolff)
2014	Eurovision Song Contest 2014	DR1	Presenter (alongside Pilou Asbæk and Nikolaj Koppel)
2016	Go' Morgen Danmark	TV 2	Presenter
2016	Danmarks Indsamling	DR1	Presenter (alongside Ulla Essendrop)
2021	X Factor 2021	TV 2	Presenter (live shows; as a stand in for Sofie Linde and later Melvin Kakooza)
2025	Feltet - Danmarks største quizkamp	TV 2 Charlie	Presenter

Preceded by (Sweden) Petra Mede	Eurovision Song Contest presenter 2014; With: Pilou Asbæk and Nikolaj Koppel	Succeeded by (Austria) Arabella Kiesbauer, Alice Tumler and Mirjam Weichselbraun
