= Mads Moldt =

Danish singer (born 2006)

- Birth name: Mads Moldt Olesen Hutzelsider
- Also known as: Meum Zel
- Born: 28 January 2006 (age 19); Frederikshavn, Denmark
- Origin: Frederikshavn, Denmark
- Genres: Pop
- Occupation: Singer
- Instrument: Vocals
- Years active: 2022–present
- Labels: Universal Music Group

Mads Moldt (Born 28 January 2006), also known by his stage name Meum Zel, is a Danish singer. He is the winner of the fifteenth season of the Danish version of X Factor.

== Performances during X Factor ==
Episode	Theme	Song	Artist	Result
Audition	Free choice	"Voodoo"	Frank Ocean	Through to 6 Chair Challenge
6 Chair Challenge	Free choice	"Dang!"	Mac Miller featuring Anderson .Paak	Through to bootcamp
Bootcamp	Free choice	"Danse"	Iomfro	Through to live shows
Live show 1	Signature	"When I R.I.P"	Labrinth	Safe (1st)
Live show 2	200th Program anniversary	"1 Thing"	Amerie	Safe (1st)
Live show 3	SoMe-Stars (Social Media Stars)	"Holy"	Justin Bieber	Safe (1st)
Live show 4	TV & Movie Songs	"Wreak Havoc"	Randy Newman	Safe (1st)
Live show 5	Nordic Artists	"Dagdrøm"	Hans Phillip	Safe (2nd)
Live show 6 – Semi-final	Party	"SexyBack"	Justin Timberlake	Safe (1st)
Live show 6 – Semi-final	The Day After	"Super Rich Kids"	Frank Ocean featuring Earl Sweatshirt	Safe (1st)
Live show 7 – Final	Judge's Choice	"See You Again"	Tyler, the Creator featuring Kali Uchis	Safe (1st)
Live show 7 – Final	Duet with a Special Guest	"Føler mig selv 100"/"Hjem fra Fabrikken" with (Andreas Odbjerg)	Andreas Odbjerg	Safe (1st)
Live show 7 – Final	Winner's song	"Clingy"	Meum Zel	Winner

== Discography ==
List of singles, with selected chart positions
Title	Year	Peak chart positions	Album
Title	Year	DEN	Album
"Clingy"	2022	24	Non-album single

=== EPs ===
- "Beauty Fall" (2023)

Preceded by Solveig Lindelof	X Factor (Denmark) winner 2022	Succeeded by ROSÉL
