= Chresten (singer) =

Danish singer

- Born: Chresten Falck Damborg
- Origin: Denmark
- Genres: Pop
- Occupation: Singer-songwriter

Chresten Falck Damborg, known as Chresten, is a Danish singer who won season 6 of the Danish X Factor. He became one of the finalists in the "Over 25" category and was mentored by Ida Corr. Prior to applying to X Factor, he worked as a toolmaker. On the final, held on 22 March 2013, he won the title with 57.9% of the popular vote with the other finalist Karoline as runner-up with 42.1% of the votes.

After he won, he was signed to Sony Music and his debut single "Let Go" charted in the Danish Singles Chart, reaching number 8. In 2014, he released his debut album Wanderlust on also on Sony Music.

== Performances during X Factor ==
Episode	Theme	Song	Artist	Result
Live show 1	Hope	""Last Po' Man" / "No Diggity""	Seasick Steve / Blackstreet	Safe (1st)
Live show 2	Against	"Magic" / "Love Lockdown"	Bruce Springsteen / Kanye West	Safe (1st)
Live show 3	Power	"Little Black Submarines" / "No Church in the Wild"	The Black Keys / Jay-Z and Kanye West featuring Frank Ocean	Safe (3rd)
Live show 4	DR BigBand	"Bitter Sweet Symphony"	The Verve	Safe (3rd)
Live show 5	Danish Hits	"Sweet Dogs"	Trolle // Siebenhaar	Safe (1st)
Live show 6 – Semi-final	Viewers Choice	"Let Her Go"	Passenger	Safe (1st)
Live show 6 – Semi-final	Judges Choice	"One Day / Reckoning Song"	Asaf Avidan	Safe (1st)
Live show 7 – Final	Free choice	"Where Did You Sleep Last Night"	Nirvana	Safe (1st)
Live show 7 – Final	Duet with guest artist	"Uden forsvar" / "Endeløst" with Marie Key and Rasmus Walter	Marie Key / Rasmus Walter	Safe (1st)
Live show 7 – Final	Winner's single	"Let Go"	Chresten	Winner

== Discography ==
=== Albums ===
Year	Album	Peak positions	Certification
Year	Album	DEN	Certification
2014	Wanderlust	18	

=== Singles ===
Year	Single	Peak positions	Certification	Album
Year	Single	DEN	Certification	Album
2013	"Let Go"	8		Wanderlust
2014	"Hanging My Youth Out"	-		Wanderlust

Preceded by Ida Østergaard Madsen	X Factor (Denmark); Winner; 2013	Succeeded by Anthony Jasmin
