= Drew Sycamore =

Danish pop singer

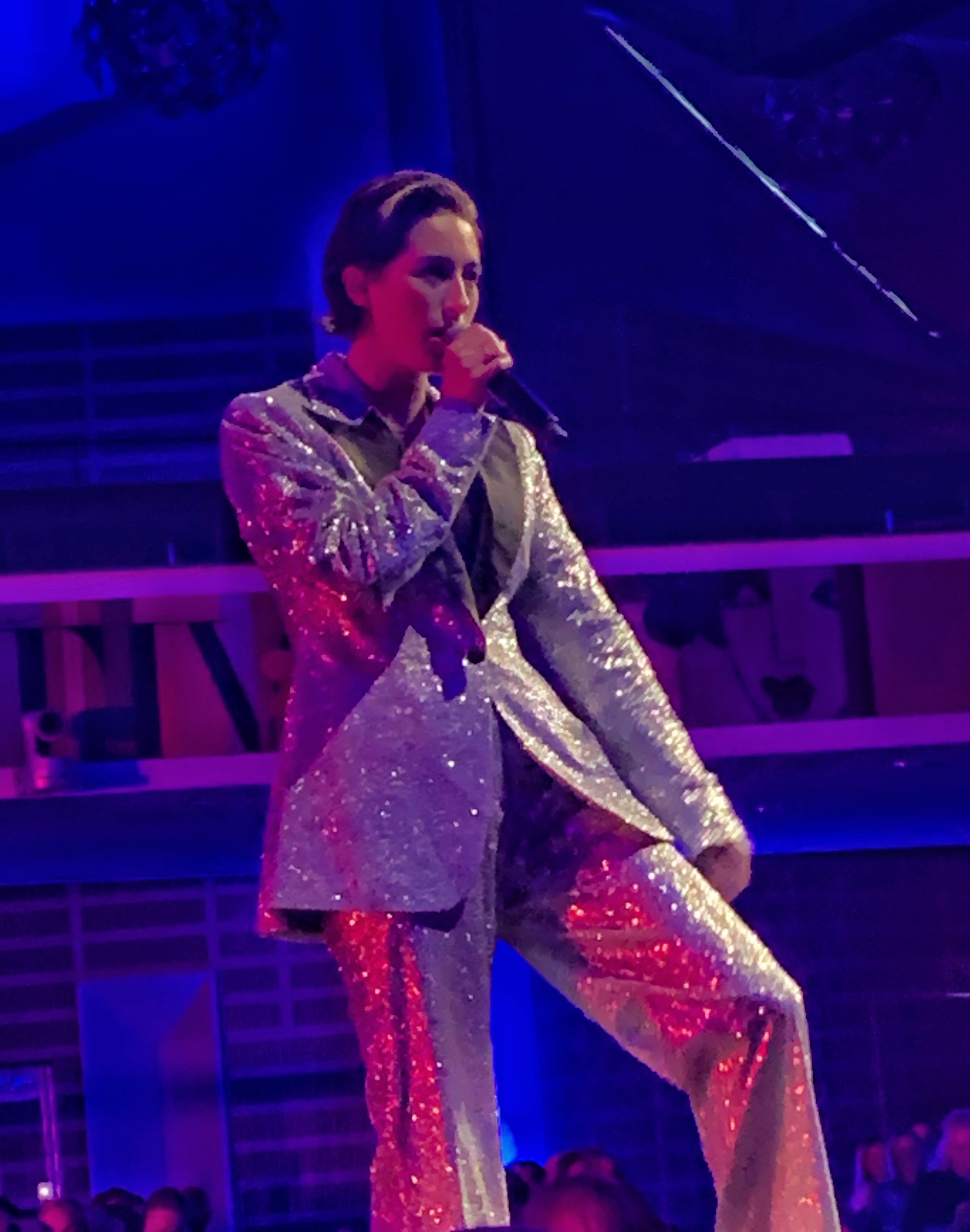
- Drew Sycamore performing in 2021

Background information
- Born: Michelle Katarina Drew Nielsen; June 1, 1990 (age 36); Hvilsom, Himmerland, Denmark
- Genres: Pop
- Occupations: Singer, songwriter
- Instruments: Vocals, guitar
- Years active: 2018–present
- Label: Warner Music Denmark
- Formerly of: DREWXHILL
- Website: drewsycamore.com

Drew Kolstrup (born Michelle Katarina Drew Nielsen, 1 June 1990), known professionally as Drew Sycamore, is a Danish singer and songwriter.

== Life and career ==
Sycamore was born in a Danish-Welsh family and grew up in village Hvilsom, near Aalestrup. After finishing high school, she moved to England to study music, where she met Philipp Hill. They formed the duo DREWXHILL and released two EPs together: Solitude and Bullets.

As a solo artist, she made her debut in 2018 with the song "Keeping Up". In 2019, she released singles "28", "Let Me Love You" and "Perfect Disaster", which preceded her debut album Brutal, released on 11 October.

In 2020, Sycamore received two nominations at Danish Music Awards. The same year she released the standalone track "Moments Gone" and two singles from her sophomore album Sycamore: "Take It Back" and "I Wanna Be Dancing", both of which topped the Danish airplay chart. The third single, "45 Fahrenheit Girl", was released in 2021 and reached the top of the chart as well. She performed at the finale of the fourteenth season of Danish X Factor. Sycamore was released on May 28, 2021, and reached the seventh position on Danish albums chart.

Sycamore received a nomination for Best Nordic Act at MTV Europe Music Awards 2021. At UK Music Video Awards, she won the award for Best Pop Video - Newcomer for "45 Fahrenheit Girl", directed by Jonatan Egholm Keis. The same year she won the P3 Award and two Danish Music Awards for Danish Soloist of the Year and Danish Radio Hit of the Year. In 2022, she won three Gaffa Awards, including Danish Album of the Year and Danish Soloist of the Year, and two Carl Awards for Sycamore. Gramex announced she was the most played Danish solo artist on the radio in 2021, the seventh among all artists, and had two songs in the top ten of the most played of the year.

"Electric Motion", the lead single from her third studio album Superfaith, was released on June 24, 2022, and debuted at the top of the Danish airplay chart. She toured over the festivals during the summer of 2022, playing at Roskilde Festival, Grøn Koncert, Smukfest, Northside Festival and Tinderbox, among others. On October 14, "Madonna" was released as the second single from Superfaith. "In The Club" was released as the third single on February 3. The album Superfaith was released on February 17, 2023. From February to March 2023, she supported Lukas Graham on their The Pink Tour.

== Personal life ==
Sycamore is married to Danish musician Mattias Kolstrup, the former vocalist of the band Dúne. She currently lives in Copenhagen.

== Discography ==
- Brutal (2019)
- Sycamore (2021)
- Superfaith (2023)
