= Kwamie Liv =

- Born: 1985 (age 40–41)
- Origin: Copenhagen, Denmark
- Genres: alternative R&B; indie pop
- Occupations: Singer-songwriter; record producer
- Years active: 2014–present
- Label: Fame Bear
- Website: soundcloud.com/kwamieliv

Kwamie Liv (born 1985) is a Danish-Zambian artist, singer and songwriter. She released the Lost In The Girl EP in 2014 and her debut album Lovers that Come and Go in November 2018.

== Life and work ==
Kwamie Liv was born in Copenhagen to a Zambian father and a Danish mother and lived in numerous countries during her childhood due to her mother's work for the United Nations.

In 2014, she released the Lost in the Girl EP, which received positive reception. The following year she released a collaboration single "Remember Me, In Every Cloud of Gold" with Angelo Badalamenti, which was part of the sound track for the Danish movie Guldkysten. She performed at the Roskilde Festival in 2015.

Between 2016 and 2018, Liv released no music but drawings and photographs on social media. She started working on her first full-length album in early 2018, and later the same year Lovers that Come and Go was released. Production and album art by Copenhagen-based producer Baby Duka.

Her "dark pop" style is connected to the "down-tempo electro-pop scene".

== Discography ==
=== Studio albums ===
- Lovers that Come and Go (2018)
- Yesterday for Tomorrow (2026)

=== EPs ===
- Lost In The Girl (2014)

=== Singles ===
- "Lost in the Girl" (2014)
- "Remember Me, In Every Cloud of Gold" (2015)
- "Higher" (2015)
- "Perfect Grace" (2016)
- "Sweet Like Brandy" (2018)
- "Follow My Heart" (2018)
- "Pleasure This Pain" (2018)
- "Blasé" (2018)
- "New Boo" (2018)

=== TV ===
She participated in the Danish musician show series known as ‘Toppen af Poppen in 2019.’
