= Sofie Linde =

Danish television presenter (born 1989)

- Born: Sofie Linde Lauridsen; 22 September 1989 (age 36); Aarhus, Denmark
- Occupation: tv-presenter

Sofie Linde Ingversen (born Sofie Linde Lauridsen, 22 September 1989 in Aarhus), professionally known as Sofie Linde, is a Danish television presenter, known for launching the #MeToo Movement in Denmark in 2020.

== Private life ==
Sofie Linde was born in Aarhus but spent most of her early life in Odder. By the time she was 18, she began working at the Danish national broadcaster DR. She made her acting debut in the 2009 Danish film Aching Hearts (Kærestesorger).

In January 2016, she debuted as the main presenter of the ninth series of the Danish version of X-Factor.

On 13 August 2017, it was announced she and television presenter Joakim Ingversen were expecting their first child. and they married on 27 December 2017.

== Statements on sexual harassment ==
In September 2020, Linde hosted the Zulu Comedy Gala and spoke about her personal experiences with workplace gender-based discrimination and sexual harassment. She said that she was the gala's second female host in fourteen years and that she had been paid less than male coworkers to host shows. She also said that when she was 18 and working at DR, a powerful person at the network had demanded sexual acts from her and threatened her career. Her speech launched the #MeToo Movement in Denmark. Hundreds of people in the news, medical, and political industries wrote letters critiquing sexism and harassment in their industries the same month. Using the hashtags #MeToo or #NejTilSexisme (transl. #NoToSexism), many shared their own experiences of harassment on social media, and dozens sent formal complaints about their experiences to DR and similar employers.

Later that September, Politiken published a letter signed by more than 700 Danish women, addressed to Linde. The letter said "you are right, we experienced it too". It was referring to Linde's critique of the sexual harassment and sexist workplace culture she had experienced. Linde's comments unleashed a wave of debate, involving the resignation of Danish Social Liberal Party leader Morten Østergaard. Copenhagen mayor Frank Jensen also admitted that he had been harassing women during his career.
