= Thomas Blachman =

Danish musician

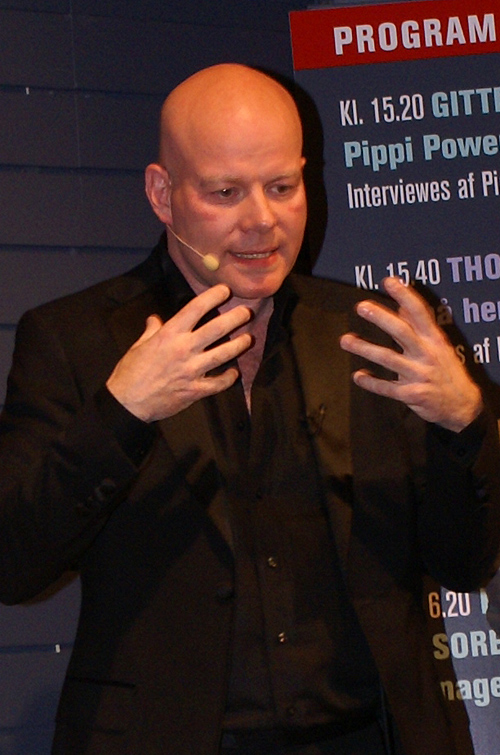
Thomas Blachman

Thomas Blachman (born 1963) is a Danish jazz musician, composer, and judge on the Danish version of X Factor.

== Biography ==
Blachman is the son of Henning and Annie Blachman. One of his grandfathers is Isak Blachman, a Jewish immigrant from Vitebsk, Belarus, who moved in 1911. He was married until 2012 to Viola Heyn-Johnsen.

== X Factor ==
In 2008, Blachman joined Lina Rafn and Remee on the judging panel for the first season of the Danish version of X Factor. He mentored the Over 25s category in his first season and finished in third place with Heidi Svelmøe Herløw. Despite reports that he would leave after the first season, he returned for the second season in 2009 and was given the Under 25s, but finished in third place with Mohamed Ali. After season 2, Blachman announced that he would not return for a third season. He was replaced by Soulshock. He said that he left the show because he felt the second season was harder than the first.

On 21 September 2010 it was confirmed that Blachman would return to the judging panel of X Factor for its fourth season as Soulshock's replacement. He joined returning judge Pernille Rosendahl and new judge Cutfather on the judging panel. For his third season, he was given the Over 25s and finished in second place with Annelouise. He returned for the fifth season in 2012 and was given the Groups. In this season, Blachman voted to eliminate his own act during week 4 of the live shows and his final act withdrew before week 5, leaving him without any act in the semi-final. Despite announcing he would leave after the fifth season, he returned for the sixth season in 2013 and was joined on the judging panel by Ida Corr and Anne Linnet. He mentored the Under 24s and finished in second place with Karoline. He returned for the seventh season in 2014 and was joined by fellow original judges Lina Rafn and Remee. He mentored the Groups in his sixth season and he made history after he guided Anthony Jasmin to victory, marking the first time a group has won X Factor and it was also the first time where Blachman finished as the winning mentor. In August, it was announced that Blachman would return as a judge for the eighth season.

== Blachman ==
After finishing season six of X Factor, Blachman started a self-titled TV series in which he and other men judge the bodies of naked women. It is screening on DR2 in Denmark.

== Discography ==
- The Story (1987)
- Impressions/Expressions (1993)
- The Style and Invention Album (1994)
- Blachman Introduces Standard Jazz & Rap, Vol. 1 (1995)
- Four Corners Of Cool (1997)
- The Library Bar Concerts (2003)
- Star Music Opus 1 (2003)
- GinmanBlachmanDahl! (2004)
- Musicality (2009)
