= X Factor (Danish TV series) season 4 =

X Factor
- Season 4
- Hosted by: Lise Rønne
- Judges: Thomas Blachman; Pernille Rosendahl; Cutfather
- Winner: Sarah Skaalum Jørgensen
- Winning mentor: Cutfather
- Runner-up: Annelouise Sørensen
- Finals venue: Parken

Release
- Original network: DR1
- Original release: January 1 – March 25, 2011

Season chronology
- ← Previous; Season 3 Next → Season 5

X Factor is a Danish television music competition to find new singing talent. The Third season premiered on January 1, 2010 and ended on March 27 on DR1. Lise Rønne returned as host. Thomas Blachman returned for his third series as judge Pernille Rosendahl for her second series and Cutfather joined for the first time as judge.

Sarah Skaalum Jørgensen was the winner.

== Selection process ==
=== Auditions ===
Auditions took place in Copenhagen and Århus in 2010.

=== Superbootcamp ===
Cutfather was given the 15-24s category, Thomas Blachman was given the Over 25s and Pernille Rosendahl was given the Groups.

=== Bootcamp ===
The 6 eliminated acts were:

- 15-24s: Ericka, Jean
- Over 25s: Maria, Mia
- Groups: Michelle & Liva, Troels & Lasse

== Contestants ==
Key:

– Winner
– Runner-up

Act	Age(s)	Hometown	Category (mentor)	Result
Sarah Skaalum Jørgensen	15	Herlev	15-24s (Cutfather)	Winner
Annelouise Sørensen	32	Copenhagen V.	Over 25s (Blachman)	Runner-up
Babou	16	Aarhus	15-24s (Cutfather)	3rd place
Patricia Bull	32	Copenhagen S.	Over 25s (Blachman)	4th place
Rikke & Trine	17	Borup	Groups (Rosendahl)	5th place
Rasmus Nielsen	17	Kirke Såby	15-24s (Cutfather)	6th place
JR	17-18	Kastrup & Malmø	Groups (Rosendahl)	7th place
Ercan Turan	25	Copenhagen S.	Over 25s (Blachman)	8th place
DeeVibez	21-24	Unknown	Groups (Rosendahl)	9th place

== Live shows ==
=== Results summary ===
Colour key

–	Contestant was in the bottom two and had to sing again in the final showdown
–	Contestant received the fewest public votes and was immediately eliminated (no final showdown)
–	Contestant received the most public votes

Contestants' colour key:

– Cutfather's contestants (15-24s)
– Blachman's contestants (Over 25s)
– Rosendahl's contestants (Groups)

Contestant	Week 1	Week 2	Week 3	Week 4	Week 5	Week 6	Week 7	
Contestant	Week 1	Week 2	Week 3	Week 4	Week 5	Week 6	1st round	2nd round
Sarah	4th 11,84%	1st 23,80%	1st 27,10%	3rd 17,52%	1st 25,12%	1st 33,48%	2nd 34,24%	Winner; 50,20%
Annelouise	6th 8,97%	6th 7,37%	5th 11,04%	6th 13,92%	4th 18,63%	2nd 26,64%	1st 39,52%	Runner-Up; 49,80%
Babou	1st 23,05%	2nd 21,28%	3rd 15,17%	4th 16,26%	3rd 20,79%	3rd 22,48%	3rd 26,23%	Eliminated (Week 7)
Patricia	5th 10,02%	7th 6,90%	2nd 16,12%	2nd 17,78%	2nd 21,27%	4th 17,40%	Eliminated (Week 6)	
Rikke & Trine	7th 8,70%	5th 8,55%	6th 8,51%	1st 20,53%	5th 14,19%	Eliminated (Week 5)		
Rasmus	2nd 15,06%	4th 12,44%	4th 13,73%	5th 14,00%	Eliminated (Week 4)			
JR	3rd 14,13%	3rd 13,73%	7th 8,33%	Eliminated (Week 3)				
Ercan	8th 5,78%	8th 5,93%	Eliminated (Week 2)					
DeeVibez	9th 2,45%	Eliminated (Week 1)						
Fewest votes	Ercan, DeeVibez	Ercan, Patricia	JR, Rikke & Trine	Rasmus, Annelouise	Rikke & Trine, Annelouise	The act that received the fewest public votes was automatically eliminated.		
Cutfather voted out	DeeVibez	Patricia	Rikke & Trine	Annelouise	Rikke & Trine	The act that received the fewest public votes was automatically eliminated.		
Rosendahl voted out	Ercan	Ercan	JR	Rasmus	Annelouise	The act that received the fewest public votes was automatically eliminated.		
Blachman voted out	DeeVibez	Ercan	JR	Rasmus	Rikke & Trine	The act that received the fewest public votes was automatically eliminated.		
Eliminated	DeeVibez; 9th	Ercan; 8th	JR; 7th	Rasmus; 6th	Rikke & Trine; 5th	Patricia; 4th	Babou; 3rd	Annelouise; Runner-Up
Eliminated	DeeVibez; 9th	Ercan; 8th	JR; 7th	Rasmus; 6th	Rikke & Trine; 5th	Patricia; 4th	Babou; 3rd	Sarah; Winner

=== Live show details ===
==== Week 1 (February 11) ====
- Theme: Free Choice
- Musical Guest: Thomas Ring ("Break the Silence")

Contestants' performances on the first live show
Act	Order	Song	Result
Deevibez	1	"Well, Well, Well,"	Eliminated
Sarah	2	"Raise Your Glass"	Safe
Ercan	3	"My Love"	Bottom two
JR	4	"Grenade"	Safe
Patricia	5	"You're the One That I Want"	Safe
Rasmus	6	"Chasing Cars"	Safe
Rikke & Trine	7	"You're Not Alone"	Safe
Babou	8	"Just the Way You Are"	Safe (Highest votes)
Annelouise	9	"Igen & Igen &"	Safe

Judges' votes to eliminate

- Rosendahl: Ercan
- Blachman: Deevibez
- Cutfather: Deevibez

==== Week 2 (February 18) ====
- Theme: The Beatles songs
- Musical Guest: Basim ("Ta' mig tilbage")

Contestants' performances on the first live show
Act	Order	Song	Result
Rasmus	1	"Drive My Car"	Safe
Rikke & Trine	2	"Here Comes the Sun"	Safe
Patricia	3	"While My Guitar Gently Weeps"	Bottom two
Babou	4	"Can't Buy Me Love"	Safe
Annelouise	5	"Golden Slumbers"	Safe
Sarah	6	"Come Together"	Safe (Highest votes)
Ercan	7	"Something"	Eliminated
JR	8	"All You Need Is Love"	Safe

Judges' votes to eliminate

- Rosendahl: Ercan
- Cutfather: Patricia
- Blachman: Ercan

==== Week 3 (February 25) ====
- Theme: Danish Hits from the 2000s
- Musical Guest: Nik & Jay ("Mod solnedgangen")
- Group Performance: "En dag tilbage" performed by Nik & Jay and the final 7

Contestants' performances on the first live show
Act	Order	Song	Result
Babou	1	"De første kærester på månen"	Safe
JR	2	"Natteravn"	Eliminated
Annelouise	3	"Splittet til atomer"	Safe
Rasmus	4	"Superliga"	Safe
Riike & Trine	5	"Kun for mig"	Bottom two
Sarah	6	"Engel"	Safe (Highest votes)
Patricia	7	"Uden hinanden"	Safe

Judges' votes to eliminate

- Blachman: JR
- Cutfather: Rikke & Trine
- Rosendahl: JR

==== Week 4 (March 4) ====
- Theme: Rock
- Musical Guest: Heidi Herløw ("Angerholic")

Contestants' performances on the first live show
Act	Order	Song	Result
Sarah	1	"Save Me from Myself"	Safe
Annelouise	2	"Creep"	Bottom two
Babou	3	"Numb"	Safe
Patricia	4	"Song 2"	Safe
Rasmus	5	"Black Hole Sun"	Eliminated
Rikke & Trine	6	"Love Will Tear Us Apart"	Safe (Highest votes)

Judges' votes to eliminate

- Cufather: Annelouise
- Blachman: Rasmus
- Rosendahl: Rasmus

==== Week 5 (March 11) ====
- Theme: Free Choice accompanied by DR UnderholdningsOrkestret
- Group Performance: "Fuck You"

Contestants' performances on the first live show
Act	Order	Song	Result
Rikke & Trine	1	"Riverside"	Eliminated
Sarah	2	"The Climb"	Safe (Highest votes)
Patricia	3	"Feeling Good"	Safe
Babou	4	"Hurt"	Safe
Annelouise	5	"Nothing Compares 2 U"	Bottom two

Judges' votes to eliminate

- Rosendahl: Annelouise
- Blachman: Rikke & Trine
- Cutfather: Rikke & Trine

==== Week 6: Semi-Final (March 18) ====
- Theme: DJ Night (with Rune RK & Kato) & Viewers choice
- Musical Guests: Clara Sofie & Rune RK ("Lever for en anden"), Infernal & Kato ("Speakers On")

Contestants' performances on the sixth live show
Act	Order	First song	Order	Second song	Result
Babou	1	"DJ Got Us Fallin' in Love"	6	"Baby"	Safe
Annelouise	2	"Sweet Child o' Mine"	7	"Empire State of Mind (Part II) Broken Down"	Safe
Sarah	3	"Sweet Dreams (Are Made of This)"	5	"Fuckin' Perfect"	Safe (Highest votes)
Patricia	4	"Når tiden går baglæns"	8	"Total Eclipse of the Heart"	Eliminated

==== Week 7: Final (25 March) ====
- Theme: Free Choice; Duet with Musical Guests; winner's single

Contestants' performances on the seventh live show
Act	Order	Free Choice Song	Order	Duet with Musical guest (Musical Guests)	Order	Winner's single	Result
Sarah	1	"Poker Face"	4	"Shall We Be Grateful"(with Carpark North)	8	"Mit Øjesten"	Winner
Annelouise	2	"Breathe Me"	5	"Out of It" (with Fallulah)	7	"Mit Øjesten"	Runner-up
Babou	3	"All the Right Moves"	6	"Back to the 80's" (with Aqua)	N/A	N/A (Already eliminated)	3rd Place
