= X Factor (Danish TV series) season 3 =

Danish Musical talent show

X Factor
- Season 3
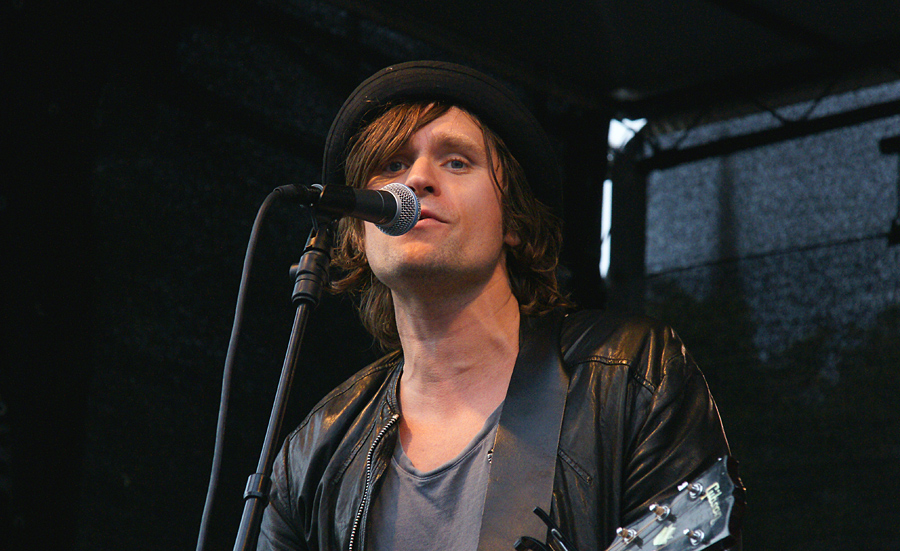
- Hosted by: Signe Muusmann
- Judges: Remee; Pernille Rosendahl; Soulshock
- Winner: Thomas Ring
- Winning mentor: Pernille Rosendahl
- Runner-up: Tine Midtgaard
- Finals venue: Parken

Release
- Original network: DR1
- Original release: 1 January – 27 March 2010

Season chronology
- ← Previous; Season 2 Next → Season 4

Only season without Thomas Blachmann

X Factor is a Danish musical talent show. Its third season premiered on 1 January 2010 and ended on 27 March on DR1. Signe Muusmann replaced Lise Rønne as host. Remee returned for his third season as judge and Pernille Rosendahl and Soushock replaced Thomas Blachman and Lina Rafn as judges.

== Selection process ==
=== Auditions ===
Auditions took place in Copenhagen and Århus in 2009.

=== Superbootcamp ===
Remee was given the 15-24s category, Rosendahl was given the Over 25s and Soulshock was given the Groups.

=== Bootcamp ===
The 6 eliminated acts were:

- 15-24s: Rasmus, Tine
- Over 25s: Eline, Joan
- Groups: Frigg, Freja & Katie, Sistersoul

== Finalists ==
Key:

– Winner
– Runner-up

| Act | Age(s) | Hometown | Category (mentor) | Result |
|---|---|---|---|---|
| Thomas Ring | 30 | Copenhagen | Over 25s (Rosendahl) | Winner |
| Tine Midtgaard | 16 | Lyngby | 15-24s (Remee) | Runner-up |
| Jesper Boesgaard | 15 | Taastrup | 15-24s (Remee) | 3rd place |
| The Fireflies | 15-22 | Randers, Skanderborg & Frederiksberg | Groups (Soulshock) | 4th place |
| Anna Nygaard | 18 | Copenhagen | 15-24s (Remee) | 5th place |
| Daniel Vensgaard | 27 | Aalborg | Over 25s (Rosendahl) | 6th place |
| 8210 | 15-19 | Aarhus | Groups (Soulshock) | 7th place |
| In-Joy | 15-24 | Aarhus, Høje Gladsaxe, Copenhagen & Herlev | Groups (Soulshock) | 8th place |
| Peter Søberg | 28 | Aalborg | Over 25s (Rosendahl) | 9th place |

== Live shows ==
Colour key:

– Contestant was in the bottom two and had to sing again in the final showdown
– Contestant received the fewest public votes and was immediately eliminated (no final showdown)
– Contestant was saved by the public

Contestants' colour key:

– Remee's contestants (15-24s)
– Rosendahl's contestants (Over 25s)
– Soulshock's contestants (Groups)

| Contestant | Week 1 | Week 2 | Week 3 | Week 4 | Week 5 | Week 6 | Final Week 7 | |
| Contestant | Week 1 | Week 2 | Week 3 | Week 4 | Week 5 | Week 6 | Round 1 | Round 2 |
|---|---|---|---|---|---|---|---|---|
| Thomas Ring | Safe | Safe | Safe | Safe | Safe | Safe | Safe | Winner (week 7) |
| Tine Midtgaard | Safe | Safe | Safe | Bottom two | Safe | Safe | Safe | Runner-up (week 7) |
| Jesper Boesgaard | Safe | Safe | Safe | Safe | Bottom two | Safe | 3rd | Eliminated (Week 7) |
| The Fireflies | Safe | Safe | Bottom two | Safe | Safe | 4th | Eliminated (Week 6) | |
| Anna Nygaard | Safe | Safe | Safe | Safe | Bottom two | Eliminated (Week 5) | | |
| Daniel Vensgaard | Safe | Bottom two | Safe | Bottom two | Eliminated (Week 4) | | | |
| 8210 | Safe | Safe | Bottom two | Eliminated (Week 3) | | | | |
| In-Joy | Bottom two | Bottom two | Eliminated (Week 2) | | | | | |
| Peter Søberg | Bottom two | Eliminated (Week 1) | | | | | | |
| Bottom two | Peter Søberg; In-Joy | Daniel Vensgaard; In-Joy | 8210; The Fireflies | Daniel Vensgaard; Tine Midtgaard | Anna Nygaard; Jesper Boesgaard | No bottom two, public votes alone decide who is eliminated. | | |
| Remee voted out | Peter Søberg | In-Joy | The Fireflies | Daniel Vensgaard | Anna Nygaard | No bottom two, public votes alone decide who is eliminated. | | |
| Rosendahl voted out | In-Joy | In-Joy | 8210 | Tine Midtgaard | Anna Nygaard | No bottom two, public votes alone decide who is eliminated. | | |
| Soulshock voted out | Peter Søberg | Daniel Vensgaard | 8210 | Daniel Vensgaard | Jesper Boesgaard | No bottom two, public votes alone decide who is eliminated. | | |
| Eliminated | Peter Søberg; 9th | In-Joy; 8th | 8210; 7th | Daniel Vensgaard; 6th | Anna Nygaard; 5th | The Fireflies; 4th | Jesper Boesgaard; 3rd | Tine Midtgaard; Runner-up |
| Eliminated | Peter Søberg; 9th | In-Joy; 8th | 8210; 7th | Daniel Vensgaard; 6th | Anna Nygaard; 5th | The Fireflies; 4th | Jesper Boesgaard; 3rd | Thomas Ring; Winner |

=== Live show details ===
Colour key:

– Contestant was in the bottom two and had to sing again in the final showdown
– Contestant was eliminated
– Contestant was saved by the public

==== Week 1 (12 February) ====
- Theme: Free Choice

Contestants' performances on the first live show
| Act | Order | Song | Result |
|---|---|---|---|
| Tine Midtgaard | 1 | "Just Like a Pill" | Safe |
| Peter Søberg | 2 | "Hold On" | Eliminated |
| 8210 | 3 | "Tik Tok" | Safe |
| Anna Nygaard | 4 | "You Know I'm No Good" | Safe |
| Daniel Vensgaard | 5 | "Hurtful" | Safe |
| The Fireflies | 6 | "You're Still the One" | Safe |
| Jesper Boesgaard | 7 | "Uprising" | Safe |
| In-Joy | 8 | "Down" | Bottom two |
| Thomas Ring | 9 | "Viva la Vida" | Safe |

Judges' votes to eliminate

- Soulshock: Peter Søberg
- Rosendahl: In-Joy
- Remee: Peter Søberg

==== Week 2 (19 February) ====
- Theme: Michael Jackson songs

Contestants' performances on the second live show
| Act | Order | Song | Result |
|---|---|---|---|
| Jesper Boesgaard | 1 | "Say Say Say" | Safe |
| The Fireflies | 2 | "Human Nature" | Safe |
| Daniel Vensgaard | 3 | "Black or White" | Bottom two |
| In-Joy | 4 | "Remember the Time" | Eliminated |
| Anna Nygaard | 5 | "Whatever Happens" | Safe |
| 8210 | 6 | "Wanna Be Startin' Somethin'" | Safe |
| Thomas Ring | 7 | "Man in the Mirror" | Safe |
| Tine Midtgaard | 8 | "Earth Song" | Safe |

Judges' votes to eliminate

- Soulshock: Daniel Vensgaard
- Rosendahl: In-Joy
- Remee: In-Joy

==== Week 3 (26 February) ====
- Theme: Rock
- Musical Guest: The Storm ("Honesty")

Contestants' performances on the third live show
| Act | Order | Song | Result |
|---|---|---|---|
| Thomas Ring | 1 | "When You Were Young" | Safe |
| Anna Nygaard | 2 | "Fighter" | Safe |
| 8210 | 3 | "Walk This Way" | Eliminated |
| Tine Midtgaard | 4 | "Sweet Child o' Mine" | Safe |
| Jesper Boesgaard | 5 | "Dry Lips" | Safe |
| The Fireflies | 6 | "Wake Me Up When September Ends" | Bottom two |
| Daniel Vensgaard | 7 | "Are You Gonna Go My Way" | Safe |

Judges' votes to eliminate

- Rosendahl: 8210
- Remee: The Fireflies
- Soulshock: 8210

==== Week 4 (5 March) ====
- Theme: UK Number Ones
- Musical Guest: Cheryl Cole ("Fight for This Love")

Contestants' performances on the fourth live show
| Act | Order | Song | Result |
|---|---|---|---|
| Daniel Vensgaard | 1 | "Paint It Black" | Eliminated |
| Jesper Boesgaard | 2 | "Fireflies" | Safe |
| Anna Nygaard | 3 | "American Boy" | Safe |
| Thomas Ring | 4 | "Mad World" | Safe |
| Tine Midtgaard | 5 | "Sex on Fire" | Bottom two |
| The Fireflies | 6 | "Bridge over Troubled Water" | Safe |

Judges' votes to eliminate

- Remee: Daniel Vensgaard
- Rosendahl: Tine Midtgaard
- Soulshock: Daniel Vensgaard

==== Week 5 (12 March) ====
- Theme: James Bond songs Associated Of DR Big Band

Contestants' performances on the fifth live show
| Act | Order | Song | James Bond Movie | Result |
|---|---|---|---|---|
| Tine Midtgaard | 1 | "Licence to Kill" | Licence to Kill | Safe |
| Anna Nygaard | 2 | "Tomorrow Never Dies" | Tomorrow Never Dies | Eliminated |
| Jesper Boesgaard | 3 | "A View to a Kill" | A View to a Kill | Bottom two |
| The Fireflies | 4 | "For Your Eyes Only" | For Your Eyes Only | Safe |
| Thomas Ring | 5 | "You Know My Name" | Casino Royale | Safe |

Judges' votes to eliminate

- Soulshock: Jesper Boesgaard
- Rosendahl: Anna Nygaard
- Remee: Anna Nygaard

==== Week 6 Semi-Final (19 March) ====
- Theme: Gasolin and Viewers Choice

Contestants' performances on the sixth live show
| Act | Order | First song | Order | Second song | Result |
|---|---|---|---|---|---|
| Jesper Boesgaard | 1 | "Kvinde min" | 5 | "Speed of Sound" | Safe |
| The Fireflies | 2 | "Hvad gør vi nu, lille du" | 6 | "Jolene" | Eliminated |
| Thomas Ring | 3 | "Langebro" | 7 | "Karma Police" | Safe |
| Tine Midtgaard | 4 | "This Is My Life" | 8 | "Black Velvet" | Safe |

The semi-final did not feature a final showdown and instead the act with the fewest public votes, The Fireflies, was automatically eliminated.

==== Week 7: Final (27 March) ====
- Theme: Free Choice; Duet with Musical Guests; winner's single

Contestants' performances on the seventh live show
| Act | Order | Free Choice Song | Order | Duet with Musical guest (Musical Guests) | Order | Winner's single | Result |
|---|---|---|---|---|---|---|---|
| Jesper Boesgaard | 1 | "Born to Be Wild" | 5 | "Let Go Of Your Love" (with Dúné) | N/A | N/A (Already eliminated) | 3rd Place |
| Tine Midtgaard | 2 | "If That's What It Takes" | 4 | "Hurtful" (with Erik Hassle) | 7 | "My Dream" | Runner-up |
| Thomas Ring | 3 | "With or Without You" | 6 | "Ensom" (with Medina) | 8 | "My Dream" | Winner |
