= Best Day (disambiguation) =

Best Day is a 2012 album by Dala.

Best Day(s) may also refer to:

- Best Days (Carpark North album), 2010
- Best Days (Matt White album), 2007, or the title song
- Best Days (Tamela Mann album), 2012, or the title song
- "Best Day", a song by Carpark North from All Things to All People, 2005
- "Best Day", a song by Kesha from the soundtrack album of the Angry Birds Movie 2, 2019
- Best Days, a 2005 album by Amy Nuttall, or the title song
- "Best Days", a song by Blur from the album The Great Escape, 1995
- "Best Days", a 2007 song by Graham Colton

== See also ==
- The Best Day (disambiguation)
