= X Factor (Danish TV series) season 1 =

X Factor
- Season 1
- Hosted by: Lise Rønne
- Judges: Thomas Blachman; Lina Rafn; Remee
- Winner: Martin Hoberg Hedegaard
- Winning mentor: Remee
- Runner-up: Laura Arensbak Kjaergaard
- Finals venue: DR Byen

Release
- Original network: DR1
- Original release: 4 January – 28 March 2008

Season chronology
- Next → Season 2

X Factor is a Danish television music competition to find new singing talent. The first season premiered on 4 January 2008 and ended on 28 March on DR1. Lise Rønne was the host, while Thomas Blachman, Lina Rafn and Remee were the judges.

Martin Hoberg Hedegaard was the winner.

== Judges and hosts ==
Lise Rønne was the host Thomas Blachman Lina Rafn & Remee were the judges

Season 1 judges

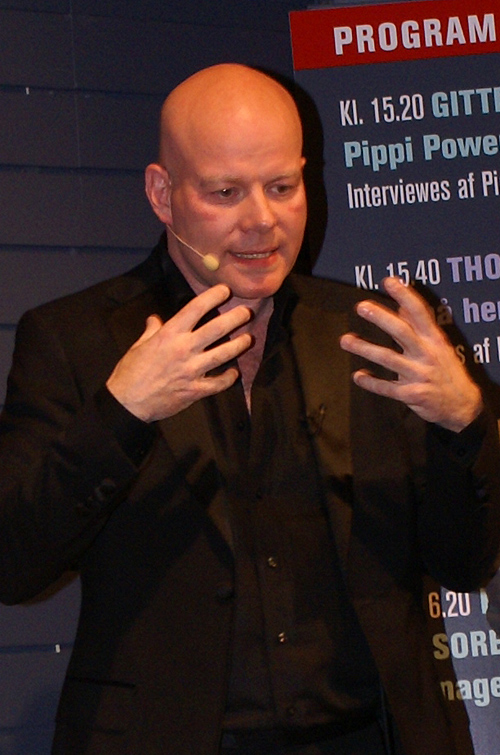
Thomas Blachman

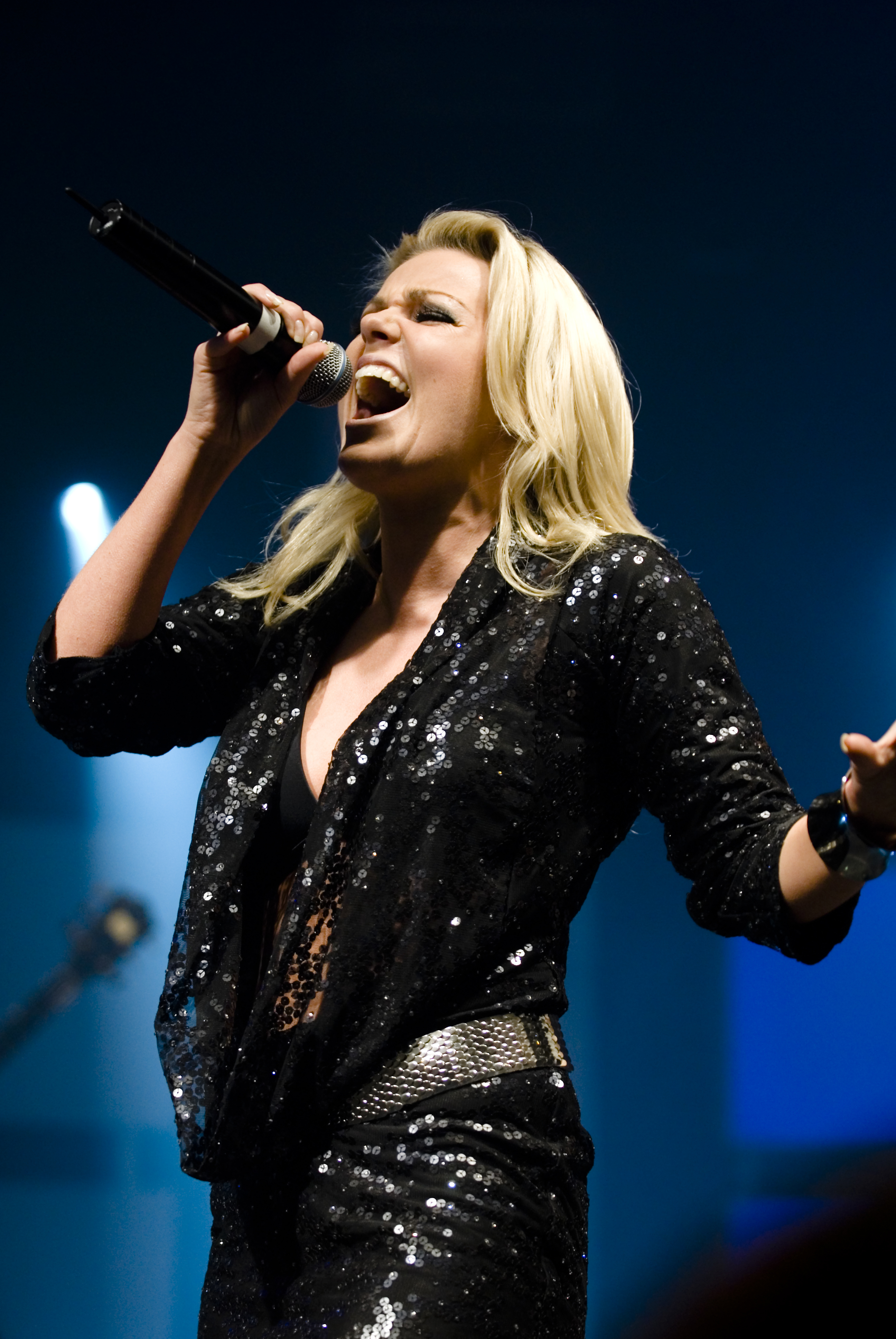
Lina Rafn

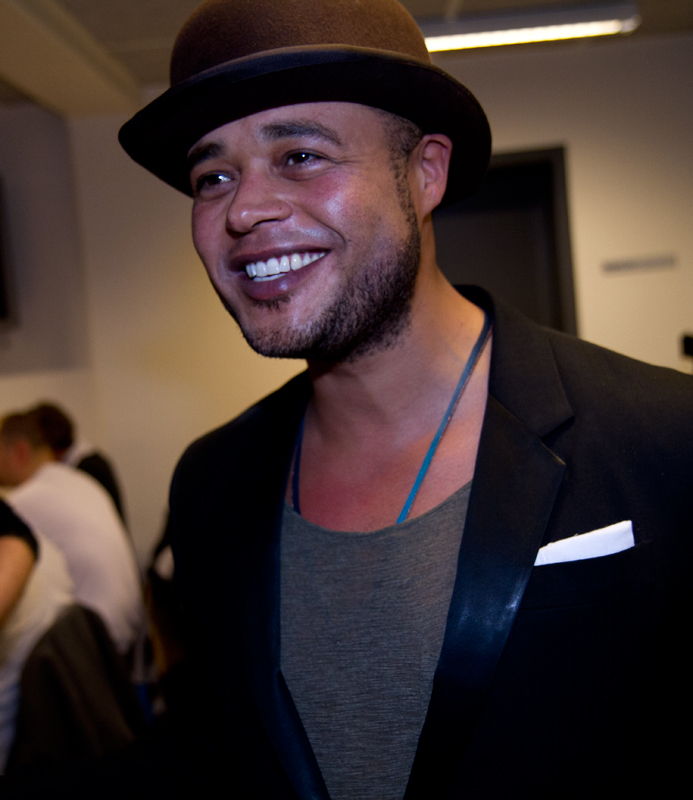
Remee

== Selection process ==
=== Auditions ===
Auditions took place in Copenhagen and Århus in 2007.

=== Bootcamp ===
Remee was given the 15-24s category, Thomas Blachman was given the Over 25s and Lina Rafn was given the Groups.

== Contestants ==
Key:

– Winner
– Runner-up

| Act | Age(s) | Hometown | Category (mentor) | Result |
|---|---|---|---|---|
| Martin Hedegaard | 15 | Ørum | 15-24s (Remee) | Winner |
| Laura Kjærgaard | 23 | Aarhus | 15-24s (Remee) | Runner-up |
| Heidi Herløw | 29 | Odense | Over 25s (Blachman) | 3rd place |
| Basim Moujahid | 15 | Høje Gladsaxe | 15-24s (Remee) | 4th place |
| VocaLoca | 21-24 | Copenhagen | Groups (Rafn) | 5th place |
| Lisa Birkevist | 27 | Strøby | Over 25s (Blachman) | 6th place |
| RaiDen | 16-28 | Copenhagen S., Brøndbyøster & Brøndby | Groups (Rafn) | 7th place |
| Frederik Konradsen | 28 | Copenhagen | Over 25s (Blachman) | 8th place |
| Søren & Anne | 21 | Aarhus & Øksbøl | Groups (Rafn) | 9th place |

== Results summary ==
Colour key:

– Contestant was in the bottom two and had to sing again in the final showdown
– Contestant received the fewest public votes and was immediately eliminated (no final showdown)
– Contestant was saved by the public

Contestants' colour key:

– Remee's contestants (15-24s)
– Blachman's contestants (Over 25s)
– Rafn's contestants (Groups)

| Contestant | Week 1 | Week 2 | Week 3 | Week 4 | Week 5 | Week 6 | Week 7 | Week 8 |
|---|---|---|---|---|---|---|---|---|
| Martin Hedegaard | Safe | Safe | Safe | Safe | Safe | Safe | Safe | Winner (Week 8) |
| Laura Kjærgaard | Safe | Safe | Safe | Safe | Safe | Safe | Safe | Runner-up (Week 8) |
| Heidi Herløw | Safe | Safe | Safe | Safe | Safe | Safe | 3rd | Eliminated (Week 7) |
| Basim Moujahid | Safe | Safe | Safe | Safe | Bottom two | 4th | Eliminated (Week 6) | |
| VocaLoca | Safe | Safe | Bottom two | Bottom two | Bottom two | Eliminated (Week 5) | | |
| Lisa Birkevist | Bottom two | Safe | Safe | Bottom two | Eliminated (Week 4) | | | |
| RaiDen | Safe | Bottom two | Bottom two | Eliminated (Week 3) | | | | |
| Frederik Konradsen | Safe | Bottom two | Eliminated (Week 2) | | | | | |
| Søren & Anne | Bottom two | Eliminated (Week 1) | | | | | | |
| Bottom two | Lisa Birkevist; Søren & Anne | Frederik Konradsen; RaiDen | RaiDen; Vocaloca | Lisa Birkevist; Vocaloca | Basim Moujahid; Vocaloca | No bottom two, public votes alone decide who is eliminated. | | |
| Remee voted out | Søren & Anne | Frederik Konradsen | RaiDen | Lisa Birkevist | VocaLoca | No bottom two, public votes alone decide who is eliminated. | | |
| Rafn voted out | Lisa Birkevist | Frederik Konradsen | RaiDen | Lisa Birkevist | Basim Moujahid | No bottom two, public votes alone decide who is eliminated. | | |
| Blachman voted out | Søren & Anne | RaiDen | VocaLoca | VocaLoca | VocaLoca | No bottom two, public votes alone decide who is eliminated. | | |
| Eliminated | Søren & Anne; 9th | Frederik Konradsen; 8th | RaiDen; 7th | Lisa Birkevist; 6th | VocaLoca; 5th | Basim Moujahid; 4th | Heidi Herløw; 3rd | Laura Kjærgaard; Runner-up |
| Eliminated | Søren & Anne; 9th | Frederik Konradsen; 8th | RaiDen; 7th | Lisa Birkevist; 6th | VocaLoca; 5th | Basim Moujahid; 4th | Heidi Herløw; 3rd | Martin Hedegaard; Winner |

=== Live show details ===
Colour key:

– Contestant was in the bottom two and had to sing again in the final showdown
– Contestant was eliminated
– Contestant was saved by the public

==== Week 1 (8 February) ====
- Theme: Hits from Tjeklisten

Contestants' performances on the first live show
| Act | Order | Song | Result |
|---|---|---|---|
| Martin Hedegaard | 1 | "As" | Safe |
| Søren & Anne | 2 | "When You're Gone" | Eliminated |
| Lisa Birkevist | 3 | "Crazy" | Bottom two |
| Basim Moujahid | 4 | "Du Kan Gøre Hvad Du Vil" | Safe |
| VocaLoca | 5 | "It's My Life" | Safe |
| Fredrik Konradsen | 6 | "My Love Is Your Love" | Safe |
| Laura Kjærgaard | 7 | "Un-Break My Heart" | Safe |
| RaiDen | 8 | "When You're Looking Like That" | Safe |
| Heidi Herløw | 9 | "Whispering at the Top of My Lungs" | Safe |

Judges' votes to eliminate

- Blachman: Søren & Anne
- Rafn: Lisa Birkevist
- Remee: Søren & Anne

==== Week 2 (15 February) ====
- Theme: Moviehits

Contestants' performances on the second live show
| Act | Order | Song | Movie | Result |
|---|---|---|---|---|
| Laura Kjærgaard | 1 | "Licence to Kill" | Licence to Kill | Safe |
| Frederik Konradsen | 2 | "My Girl" | My Girl | Eliminated |
| RaiDen | 3 | "I Don't Want to Miss a Thing" | Armageddon | Bottom two |
| Basim Moujahid | 4 | "You Are the Music in Me" | High School Musical 2 | Safe |
| Heidi Herløw | 5 | "Calling You" | Out of Rosenheim | Safe |
| VocaLoca | 6 | "Krummes Sang" | Krummerne | Safe |
| Martin Hedegaard | 7 | "Kiss from a Rose" | Batman Forever | Safe |
| Lisa Birkevist | 8 | "Purple Rain" | Purple Rain | Safe |

Judges' votes to eliminate

- Blachman: RaiDen
- Rafn: Frederik Konradsen
- Remee: Frederik Konradsen

==== Week 3 (22 February) ====
- Theme: Disco

Contestants' performances on the third live show
| Act | Order | Song | Result |
|---|---|---|---|
| Basim Moujahid | 1 | "Celebration" | Safe |
| VocaLoca | 2 | "Gimme! Gimme! Gimme! (A Man After Midnight)" | Bottom two |
| Lisa Birkevist | 3 | "I'm Every Woman" | Safe |
| Martin Hedegaard | 4 | "Rock with You" | Safe |
| RaiDen | 5 | "Tragedy" | Eliminated |
| Heidi Herløw | 6 | "All Around the World" | Safe |
| Laura Kjærgaard | 7 | "I Will Survive" | Safe |

Judges' votes to eliminate

- Blachman: Vocaloca
- Remee: RaiDen
- Rafn: RaiDen

==== Week 4 (29 February) ====
- Theme: Sing Danish

Contestants' performances on the fourth live show
| Act | Order | Song | Result |
|---|---|---|---|
| Martin Hedegaard | 1 | "Kom Tilbage Nu" | Safe |
| Lisa Birkevist | 2 | "Dansevise" | Eliminated |
| VocaLoca | 3 | "Buster" | Bottom two |
| Heidi Herløw | 4 | "Verden er i Farver" | Safe |
| Basim Moujahid | 5 | "Tænder på dig" | Safe |
| Laura Kjærgaard | 6 | "Du Er" | Safe |

Judges' votes to eliminate

- Blachman: VocaLoca
- Rafn: Lisa Birkevist
- Remee: Lisa Birkevist

==== Week 5 (7 March) ====
- Theme: BigBand

Contestants' performances on the fifth live show
| Act | Order | Song | Result |
|---|---|---|---|
| Laura Kjærgaard | 1 | "If I Ain't Got You" | Safe |
| Basim Moujahid | 2 | "Can't Take My Eyes Off You" | Bottom two |
| Heidi Herløw | 3 | "Walk Away" | Safe |
| Martin Hedegaard | 4 | "Somebody to Love" | Safe |
| VocaLoca | 5 | "It Don't Mean a Thing (If It Ain't Got That Swing)" | Eliminated |

Judges' votes to eliminate

- Remee: VocaLoca
- Rafn: Basim Moujahid
- Blachman: VocaLoca

==== Week 6: Quarter-Final (14 March) ====
- Theme: Anne Linnet and Elvis Presley
- Musical Guest: Shayne Ward ("No U Hang Up")

Contestants' performances on the sixth live show
| Act | Order | First song | Order | Second song | Result |
|---|---|---|---|---|---|
| Martin Hedegaard | 1 | "Smuk og Dejlig" | 5 | "Can't Help Falling in Love" | Safe |
| Laura Kjærgaard | 2 | "Ingen Anden Drøm" | 6 | "Suspicious Minds" | Safe |
| Basim Moujahid | 3 | "Glor på Vinduer" | 7 | "Always On My Mind" | Eliminated |
| Heidi Herløw | 4 | "Det er Ikke Det Du Siger" | 8 | "A Little Less Conversation" | Safe |

Basim Moujahid received the fewest public votes and was automatically eliminated

==== Week 7: Semi-Final (21 March) ====
- Theme: James Blunt and Free Choice
- Musical Guest: James Blunt ("Carry You Home")

Contestants' performances on the seventh live show
| Act | Order | First song | Order | Second song | Result |
|---|---|---|---|---|---|
| Martin Hedegaard | 1 | "Goodbye My Lover" | 4 | "What Goes Around... Comes Around" | Safe |
| Heidi Herløw | 2 | "You're Beautiful" | 5 | "Why" | Eliminated |
| Laura Kjærgaard | 3 | "Same Mistake" | 6 | "No One" | Safe |

Heidi Herløw received the fewest public votes and was automatically eliminated

==== Week 8: Final (28 March) ====
- Theme: Viewers Choice; Free Choice; winner's single

Contestants' performances on the eight live show
| Act | Order | Viewers Choice Song | Order | Free Choice Song | Order | Winner's single | Result |
|---|---|---|---|---|---|---|---|
| Martin Hedegaard | 1 | "Somebody to Love" | 3 | "For Once in My Life" | 6 | "The 1" | Winner |
| Laura Kjærgaard | 2 | "Du Er" | 4 | "You Raise Me Up" | 5 | "The 1" | Runner-up |
