= Lost (Carpark North album) =

Studio album by Carpark North
- Released: 27 August 2010
- Genre: Electronic rock, alternative rock
- Length: 45:11
- Label: Sony Music

Carpark North chronology
| Grateful (2008) | Lost (2010) | Best Days (Greatest & Live) (2010) |

Singles from Lost
- 1. "Lost (Peace)" Released: 5 March 2010; 2. "Just Human" Released: 30 April 2010; 3. "Leave My Place" Released: January 2011

Lost is the first internationally released album by Danish electronic rock band Carpark North.

In 2009 Carpark North was contacted by Swedish label "Mr. Radar" who wanted to sign the band through Sony Music worldwide. The band re-recorded songs from their three studio albums, Carpark North (2003), All Things to All People (2005) and Grateful (2008), which resulted in the creation of the super album "Lost".

The album was released on 27 August 2010 in the United Kingdom and Germany, on 1 September 2010 in Europe, and on 14 September 2010 in North America.

The song "Save Me from Myself" was covered by Brazilian Christian rock band Oficina G3 and Christian musician Michael W. Smith.

== Track listing ==
| No. | Title | Length |
|---|---|---|
| 1. | "Lost (Peace)" | 4:12 |
| 2. | "Just Human" | 2:32 |
| 3. | "Subusual" | 4:29 |
| 4. | "Transparent" | 3:40 |
| 5. | "Leave My Place" | 4:31 |
| 6. | "Save Me from Myself" | 4:14 |
| 7. | "Beasts" | 6:33 |
| 8. | "More" | 3:26 |
| 9. | "Shall We Be Grateful" | 3:25 |
| 10. | "Cancer" | 3:57 |
| 11. | "Shutdown" | 4:12 |
