= X Factor (Danish TV series) season 5 =

X Factor
- Season 5
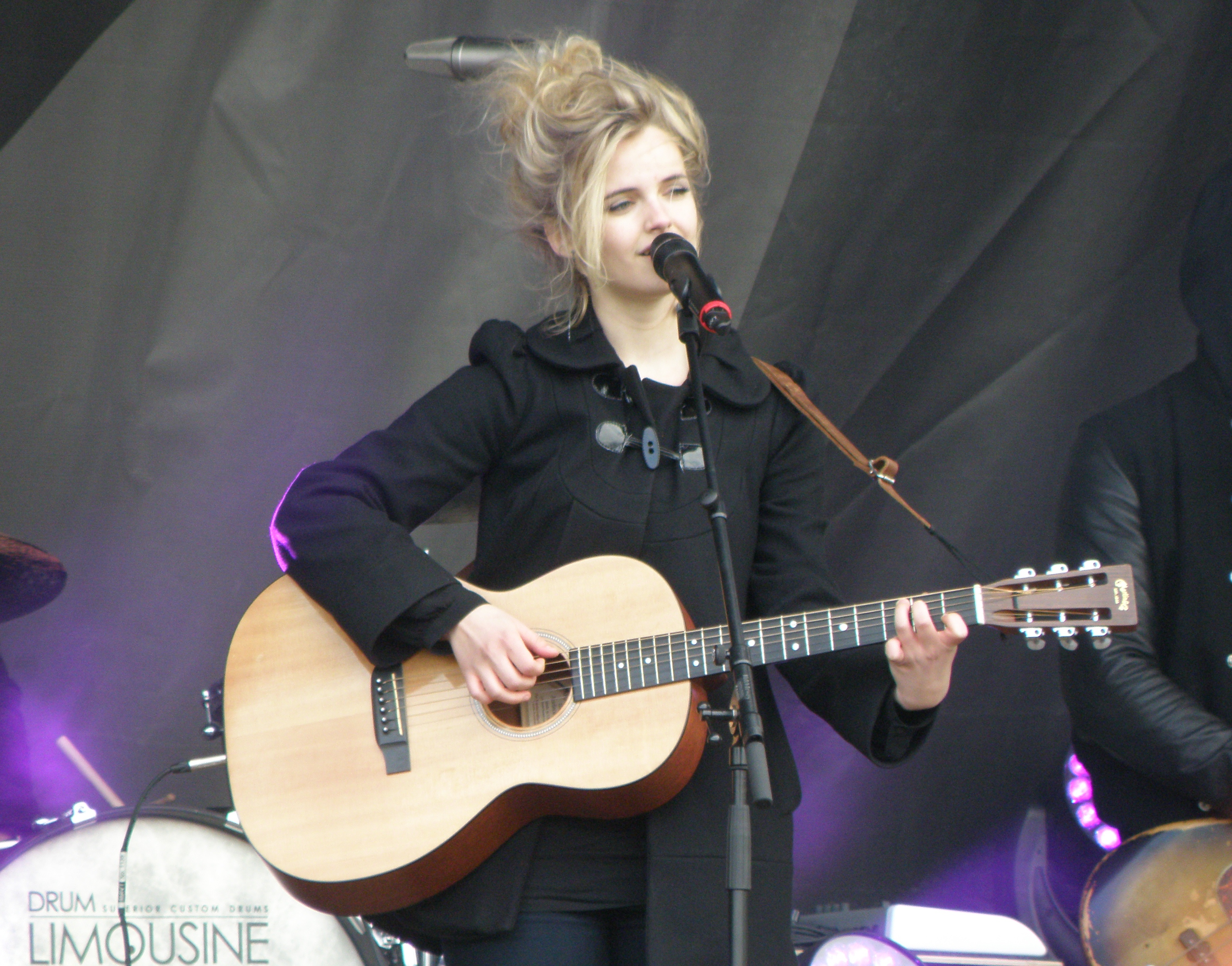
- Hosted by: Lise Rønne
- Judges: Thomas Blachman; Pernille Rosendahl; Cutfather
- Winner: Ida Østergaard Madsen
- Winning mentor: Pernille Rosendahl
- Runner-up: Line Larsen
- Finals venue: Jyske Bank Boxen

Release
- Original network: DR1
- Original release: 1 January – 23 March 2012

Season chronology
- ← Previous; Season 4 Next → Season 6

X Factor is a Danish television music competition to find new singing talent. The fifth season premiered on 1 January 2012 on DR1, and ended on 23 March 2012 at Jyske Bank Boxen. Lise Rønne returned for her fourth season as host. Thomas Blachman, Pernille Rosendahl and Cutfather returned for their respective fourth, third and second seasons.

== Judges and host ==
On 12 September 2011 it was announced that Thomas Blachman, Pernille Rosendahl and Cutfather would all be returning as judges for season 5, along with Lise Rønne as host.

== Selection process ==
=== Auditions ===
Auditions took place in Copenhagen and Århus.

=== Superbootcamp ===
Cutfather was given the Over 25s category, Rosendahl was given the 15–24s and Blachman was given the Groups.

=== Bootcamp ===
Cutfather was assisted by Kato in choosing his final three in the Over 25s category for the live shows; Rosendahl was assisted by Mattias Kolstrup in choosing her final three in the 15–24s category; and Blachman was assisted in choosing his final three in the Groups category by Dicte.

The 6 eliminated acts were:

- 15–24s: Jonas, Kristel
- Over 25s: Jason, Kristel
- Groups: Double Trouble, Julie & Johnnie

== Contestants ==
Key:

– Winner
– Runner-up
– Withdrew

Act	Age(s)	Hometown	Category (mentor)	Result
Ida Østergaard Madsen	17	Videbæk	15-24s (Rosendahl)	Winner
Line Dissing Karred Larsen	15	Ålbæk	15-24s (Rosendahl)	Runner-up
Sveinur Gaard Olsen	30	Copenhagen	Over 25s (Cufather)	3rd place
Morten Benjamin	22	Horsens	15-24s (Rosendahl)	4th place
Nicoline Simone & Jean Michel	16-24	Nordborg & Nyborg	Groups (Blachman)	5th place
Tandberg & Østenby	19-20	Køge & Faxe	Groups (Blachman)	6th place
Mulila Phiri	26	Odense	Over 25s (Cutfather)	7th place
Katrine Klith Andersen	27	Randers	Over 25s (Cufather)	8th place
Phoung & Rasmus	19-22	Aarhus & Odense	Groups (Blachman)	9th place

== Live shows ==
The live shows started on 10 February 2012 at DR Byen.

Colour key

–	Contestant was in the bottom two and had to sing again in the final showdown
–	Contestant received the fewest public votes and was immediately eliminated (no final showdown)
–	Contestant received the most public votes

Contestants' colour key:

– Rosendahl's contestants (15–24s)
– Cutfather's contestants (Over 25s)
– Blachman's contestants (Groups)

	Week 1	Week 2	Week 3	Week 4	Week 5	Week 6		Week 7	
	Week 1	Week 2	Week 3	Week 4	Week 5	Normal Voting	Elimination Results (+ Week 5)	1st round	2nd round
Ida	1st 25,2%	1st 26,7%	1st 25,2%	1st 20,7%	1st 30,9%	1st 32,8%	1st 32,1%	1st 45,8%	Winner; 61,7%
Line	6th 6,7%	4th 9,8%	5th 12,4%	4th 16,7%	2nd 26,7%	2nd 24,0%	2nd 25,1%	2nd 37,6%	Runner-Up; 38,3%
Sveinur	3rd 12,5%	6th 9,0%	4th 15,8%	3rd 17,9%	3rd 23,1%	4th 21,3%	3rd 22,0%	3rd 16,6%	Eliminated (Week 7)
Morten Benjamin	2nd 22,4%	3rd 13,5%	2nd 16,5%	5th 13,9%	4th 19,2%	3rd 21,9%	4th 20,9%	Eliminated (Week 6)	
Nicoline Simone & Jean Michel	5th 9,9%	2nd 15,3%	3rd 16,2%	2nd 18,1%	—N/a	Withdrew (Week 5)			
Tandberg & Østenby	7th 5,9%	5th 9,4%	7th 6,8%	6th 12,7%	Eliminated (Week 4)				
Mulila	4th 11,4%	8th 8,1%	6th 7,0%	Eliminated (Week 3)					
Katrine	9th 1,8%	7th 8,2%	Eliminated (Week 2)						
Phuong & Rasmus	8th 4,1%	Eliminated (Week 1)							
Fewest votes	Katrine, Phuong & Rasmus	Katrine, Mulila	Mulila, Tandberg & Østenby	Morten Benjamin, Tandberg & Østenby	—N/a	The act that received the fewest public votes was automatically eliminated.			
Cutfather voted out	Phuong & Rasmus	Katrine	Tandberg & Østenby	—N/a^{1}	—N/a	The act that received the fewest public votes was automatically eliminated.			
Rosendahl voted out	Phuong & Rasmus	Mulila	Mulila	Tandberg & Østenby	—N/a	The act that received the fewest public votes was automatically eliminated.			
Blachman voted out	Katrine	Katrine	Mulila	Tandberg & Østenby^{1}	—N/a	The act that received the fewest public votes was automatically eliminated.			
Eliminated	Phuong & Rasmus; 9th	Katrine; 8th	Mulila; 7th	Tandberg & Østenby; 6th	Nicoline Simone & Jean Michel; 5th withdrew	Morten Benjamin; 4th		Sveinur; 3rd	Line; Runner-Up
Eliminated	Phuong & Rasmus; 9th	Katrine; 8th	Mulila; 7th	Tandberg & Østenby; 6th	Nicoline Simone & Jean Michel; 5th withdrew	Morten Benjamin; 4th		Sveinur; 3rd	Ida; Winner

^{1} In week 4, Blachman voted against his own act and Cutfather didn't have to vote, but he later said that he would have voted against Tandberg & Østenby.

=== Live show details ===
==== Week 1 (10 February) ====
- Theme: Free choice

Contestants' performances on the first live show
Act	Order	Song	Result
Katrine	1	"White Nights"	Bottom two
Nicoline Simone & Jean Michel	2	"My Body Is a Cage"	Safe
Line	3	"Heaven"	Safe
Sveinur	4	"Somebody That I Used to Know"	Safe
Tandberg & Østenby	5	"Toxic"	Safe
Mulila	6	"That's Not My Name"	Safe
Morten Benjamin	7	"Titanium"	Safe
Phuong & Rasmus	8	"Speak Out Now"	Eliminated
Ida	9	"Skinny Love"	Safe (Highest votes)

Judges' votes to eliminate

- Blachman: Katrine
- Cutfather: Phuong & Rasmus
- Rosendahl: Phuong & Rasmus

==== Week 2 (17 February) ====
- Theme: Danish hits

Contestants' performances on the second live show
Act	Order	Song	Result
Morten Benjamin	1	"København"	Safe
Mulila	2	"Søvnløs"	Bottom two
Sveinur	3	"Surprise Me"	Safe
Tandberg & Østenby	4	"The Void (Trentemøller Piano Version)"	Safe
Line	5	"Glemmer dig aldrig"	Safe
Nicoline Simone & Jean Michel	6	"Somersault"	Safe
Ida	7	"Nothing's Wrong Song"	Safe (Highest votes)
Katrine	8	"The Second You Sleep"	Eliminated

Judges' votes to eliminate

- Cutfather: Katrine
- Rosendahl: Mulila
- Blachman: Katrine

==== Week 3 (24 February) ====
- Theme: Dance hits

Contestants' performances on the third live show
Act	Order	Song	Result
Line	1	"Only Girl (In the World)"	Safe
Tandberg & Østenby	2	"Raise Your Weapon"	Bottom two
Sveinur	3	"Blue Monday"	Safe
Ida	4	"Save the World"	Safe (Highest votes)
Mulila	5	"Wild Ones"	Eliminated
Morten Benjamin	6	"Beautiful People"	Safe
Nicoline Simone & Jean Michel	7	"DJ, Ease My Mind"	Safe

Judges' votes to eliminate

- Cutfather: Tandberg & Østenby
- Rosendahl: Mulila
- Blachman: Mulila

==== Week 4 (2 March) ====
- Theme: Mash-ups

Contestants' performances on the fourth live show
Act	Order	Song	Result
Ida	1	"Fix You"/"Use Somebody"	Safe (Highest votes)
Nicoline Simone & Jean Michel	2	"Some Velvet Morning"/"Policy of Truth"/"Strangelove"/"Down by the Water"	Safe
Morten Benjamin	3	"No Surprises"/"What a Wonderful World"	Bottom two
Line	4	"Mercy"/"Rolling in the Deep"/"Bad Romance"/"Crazy"	Safe
Tandberg & Østenby	5	"Teardrop"/"Within You Without You"/"Born This Way"	Eliminated
Sveinur	6	"Misery Business"/"E.T."	Safe

Judges' votes to eliminate

- Rosendahl: Tandberg & Østenby
- Blachman: Tandberg & Østenby
- Cutfather: didn't have to vote, but he later said that he would have voted against Tandberg & Østenby.

==== Week 5 (9 March) ====
- Theme: Songs by Rasmus Seebach
- Musical Guest: Lionel Richie & Rasmus Seebach ("Say You, Say Me")

Contestants' performances on the fifth live show
Act	Order	Song	Result
Morten Benjamin	1	"En skygge af dig selv"	Safe
Line	2	"Den jeg er"	Safe
Sveinur	3	"Glad igen"	Safe
Ida	4	"Nangijala"	Safe (Highest votes)

There was no elimination this week due to Nicoline Simone & Jean Michel withdrawing for personal reasons. All votes from this week were moved forward to the next week.

==== Week 6: Semi-final (16 March) ====
- Theme: Unplugged songs; Rap songs (duet)
- Musical Guests: Yepha ("Det går ned"), Kesi ("Ku Godt") & Clemens feat. Sarah West ("Ingen kender dagen")

Contestants' performances on the sixth live show
Act	Order	First song	Order	Second song	Result
Sveinur	1	"Little Lion Man"	8	"Hurricane" (together with Clemens)	Safe
Line	2	"I'm with You"	5	"Invincible" (together with Kesi)	Safe
Morten Benjamin	3	"Cecilia"	6	"Limit to Your Love" (together with Yepha)	Eliminated
Ida	4	"Dream"	7	"You Got the Love" (together with Kesi)	Safe (Highest votes)

The semi-final did not feature a final showdown and instead the act with the fewest public votes, Morten Benjamin, was automatically eliminated.

==== Week 7: Final (23 March) ====
Contestants' performances on the seventh live show
Act	Order	First song	Order	Second song (duet)	Order	Third song	Result
Ida	1	"Paradise"	4	"Ordinary Things" (with Lukas Graham)	8	"I Can Be"	Winner
Sveinur	2	"Hysteria"	5	"Sun of a Gun" (with Oh Land)	N/A	N/A (Already eliminated)	3rd Place
Line	3	"Skyscraper"	6	"The Spell" (with Alphabeat)	7	"Efter dig"	Runner-up
