= Alt det jeg ville have sagt (album) =

Studio album by Basim
- Released: 6 October 2008
- Recorded: 2008
- Genre: Pop
- Label: Universal Music Group

Basim chronology
Alt det jeg ville have sagt (2008)	Befri dig selv (2009)

Singles from Alt det jeg ville have sagt
- 1. "Alt det jeg ville have sagt" Released: 11 August 2008; 2. "Jeg vil" Released: October 2008; 3. "Baby, jeg savner dig" Released: 26 March 2009

Alt det jeg ville have sagt is the debut studio album by Danish pop singer and songwriter Basim. It was released in Denmark on 6 October 2008. The album peaked at number eight on the Danish Albums Chart. The album includes the singles "Alt det jeg ville have sagt", "Jeg vil" and "Baby, jeg savner dig".

== Singles ==
- "Alt det jeg ville have sagt" was released as the lead single from the album on 11 August 2008. The song peaked at number 34 on the Danish Singles Chart.
- "Jeg vil" was released as the second single from the album in October 2008. The song peaked number 26 on the Danish Singles Chart.
- "Baby, jeg savner dig" was released as the third single from the album on 26 March 2009.

== Track listing ==
Standard listing
No.	Title	Length
1.	"Forskellige Verdner"	3:39
2.	"Alt det jeg ville have sagt"	3:08
3.	"Jeg vil"	4:05
4.	"Større End Dig & Mig"	3:44
5.	"Mangler Ord"	3:27
6.	"Imod Resten Af Verden"	3:37
7.	"En Sensommer morgen"	3:35
8.	"Baby, Jeg Savner Dig"	4:23
9.	"Tag Med Mig"	4:09
10.	"Når Det Regner"	4:55
11.	"Glor På Vinduer"	2:44
12.	"Himlen Har Alt For Mange Engle"	3:59

== Chart performance ==
=== Weekly charts ===
Chart (2008)	Peak position
Danish Albums (Hitlisten)	8

== Release history ==
Region	Release date	Format	Label
Denmark	6 October 2008	Digital Download	Universal Music Group
