= Best Days (Carpark North album) =

Best Days (Greatest & Live)

Compilation album by Carpark North
- Released: 1 November 2010
- Genre: Electronic rock
- Label: Copenhagen Records

Carpark North chronology
Lost (2010)	Best Days (Greatest & Live) (2010)	Phoenix (2014)

Singles from Best Days (Greatest & Live)
- 1. "Burn It" Released: 13 September 2010; 2. "Everything Starts Again" Released: 2011

Best Days (Greatest & Live) is a compilation album by Danish electronic rock band Carpark North. It was released on 1 November 2010 through Copenhagen Records.

The first CD contains songs from the band's three studio albums, Carpark North (2003), All Things to All People (2005), and Grateful (2008). In addition, there are two new tracks "Burn It" and "Everything Starts Again", which were released as singles in 2010 and 2011.

The second CD is a live album recorded during "Grøn Koncert" in the summer of 2010. It also includes four tracks from the band's first internationally released album, Lost (2010).

== Track listing ==
Disc 1 – Best Days
No.	Title	Originally from	Length
1.	"Burn It"		3:31
2.	"Save Me from Myself"	Grateful	3:14
3.	"Transparent & Glasslike"	Carpark North	3:34
4.	"Fireworks"	All Things to All People	4:19
5.	"Shall We Be Grateful"	Grateful	3:24
6.	"Human"	All Things to All People	2:26
7.	"40 Days"	Carpark North	3:03
8.	"More"	Grateful	3:25
9.	"There's a Place"	Carpark North	4:04
10.	"Best Day"	All Things to All People	4:15
11.	"Wild Wonders"	Carpark North	3:50
12.	"Leave My Place"	Grateful	4:31
13.	"The Beasts"	All Things to All People	6:21
14.	"Everything Starts Again"		4:32

Disc 2 – Live 2010
No.	Title	Length
1.	"More" (Live)	3:49
2.	"Best Day" (Live)	3:50
3.	"Save Me from Myself" (Live)	3:40
4.	"The Beasts" (Live)	6:29
5.	"Lost (Peace)" (Live)	4:16
6.	"Burn It" (Live)	3:35
7.	"Just Human" (Live)	3:25
8.	"Transparent & Glasslike" (Live)	5:47
9.	"Shall We Be Grateful" (Live)	6:55
10.	"Just Human" (International version)	2:30
11.	"Subusual" (International version)	4:30
12.	"Transparent" (International version)	3:39
13.	"Beasts" (International version)	6:32

== Charts ==
Chart (2010–11)	Peak position
Danish Albums (Hitlisten)	10
