= VocaLoca =

Danish musical group

- Origin: Denmark
- Genres: Pop
- Years active: 2006–2010
- Past members: Jan Ulrich Lauridsen; Charlotte Rose Lauridsen; Erik Kolind; Katrine Martinsen Gottschalck; Magnus Glindvad Rasch

VocaLoca was a Danish pop music a capella quintet from Denmark that existed from 2006 to 2010. The band consisted of Jan Ulrich Lauridsen, Charlotte Rose Lauridsen, Erik Kolind, Katrine Martinsen Gottschalck and Magnus Glindvad Rasch, and competed in the first season of the Danish version of The X Factor. They were eliminated in the 5th live show, coming in 5th place.

== Performances during X Factor ==
VocaLoca landed in the bottom two 3 weeks in a row first time with RaiDen, second time with Lisa Birkevist, and third with Basim Moujahid.

Episode	Theme	Song	Artist	Result
Audtition	Free Choice			Through to Bootcamp (Day 1)
Bootcamp (Day 1)	Free Choice	"I Want It That Way"	Backstreet Boys	Through to Bootcamp (Day 2)
Bootcamp (Day 2)	Free Choice			Through to Live Shows
Live show 1	Hits from Tjeklisten	"It's My Life"	Bon Jovi	Safe
Live show 2	FilmHits	"Krummes Sang"	Lars Høybye	Safe
Live show 3	Disco	"Gimme! Gimme! Gimme! (A Man After Midnight)"	ABBA	Bottom two
Live show 4	Sing Danish	"Buster"	Nanna	Bottom two
Live show 5	BigBand	"It Don't Mean a Thing (If It Ain't Got That Swing)"	Duke Ellington	Eliminated (5th)
