= Lad ikke solen gå ned =

Single by Basim

from the album Befri dig selv
- Released: October 2009
- Recorded: 2009
- Genre: Pop
- Length: 3:01
- Label: Universal Music Group
- Songwriter(s): Stefan Michael Greering Hoffenberg, Anis Basim Moujahid, Lis Sørensen, Louis Winding

Basim singles chronology
"Befri dig selv" (2009)	"Lad ikke solen gå ned" (2009)	"Ta' mig tilbage" (2011)

"Lad ikke solen gå ned" is a song by Danish singer Basim and Lis Sørensen. The song was released in Denmark in October 2009 as the second single from his second studio album Befri dig selv (2009). The song has peaked to number 15 on the Danish Singles Chart.

== Track listing ==
Digital download
No.	Title	Length
1.	"Lad ikke solen gå ned"	3:52

== Chart performance ==
=== Weekly charts ===
Chart (2009)	Peak position
Denmark (Tracklisten)	15

== Release history ==
Region	Date	Format	Label
Denmark	October 2009	Digital download	Universal Music Group
