= I Can Be =

I Can Be may refer to:

- "I Can Be" (Taio Cruz song), a song by British pop/R&B singer Taio Cruz
- "I Can Be" (Ida song), a song by Danish singer Ida
- "I Can Be", a song by American R&B singer Aaliyah from the album Aaliyah (album)
- "I Can Be a Firefighter", an episode of Barney & Friends (season 3, episode 4)

== See also ==
- All I Can Be, an album by country singer Collin Raye
