= Noah Skaalum =

Danish singer (born 1995)

- Born: Sarah Skaalum Jørgensen; 6 July 1995 (age 30); Herlev, Denmark
- Origin: Denmark
- Genres: Pop
- Instruments: Vocals, guitar, piano, bass
- Years active: 2007–2014

Noah Skaalum Jørgensen (born Sarah Skaalum Jørgensen; 6 July 1995) is a Danish singer who won the fourth season of the Danish version of The X Factor on 25 March 2011 at the age of 15. Assigned female at birth, Skaalum publicly came out as a trans man in 2018.

== Biography ==
Skaalum started singing at a young age, appearing in musicals and joining a musical band at the age of 12. At the age of 15, Skaalum won the fourth season of the Danish version of The X Factor, defeating Babou Lowe and Annelouise Sørensen in the final on 25 March 2011.

== Personal life ==
On 12 December 2014, at the age of 19, Skaalum married girlfriend Sika Katrine Andersen. In 2018, Skaalum publicly came out as a trans man, announcing his new name as Noah. He and his wife have a son, born 26 November 2019. In 2020, he starred in a documentary about his transition, Sarahs forvandling til far, which aired on TV 2.

== Performances during X Factor ==
Episode	Theme	Song	Original artist	Result
Live show 1	Free choice	"Raise Your Glass"	P!nk	Safe (4th)
Live show 2	The Beatles	"Come Together"	The Beatles	Safe (1st)
Live show 3	Danish hits from the 2000s	"Engel"	Rasmus Seebach	Safe (1st)
Live show 4	Rock	"Save Me from Myself"	Carpark North	Safe (3rd)
Live show 5	Free choice with DR big band	"The Climb"	Miley Cyrus	Safe (1st)
Live show 6 - Semi-final	DJ night	"Sweet Dreams (Are Made of This)"	Eurythmics	Safe (1st)
Live show 6 - Semi-final	Viewers' choice	Fuckin' Perfect	P!nk	Safe (1st)
Live show 7 - Final	Free choice	"Poker Face"	Lady Gaga	Safe (2nd)
Live show 7 - Final	Duet with guest artist	"Shall We Be Grateful" (with Carpark North)	Carpark North	Safe (2nd)
Live show 7 - Final	Winner's single	"Min Øjesten"	Sarah	Winner

== Discography ==
=== Albums ===
Title	Details	Peak chart positions	Certifications
Title	Details	DEN	Certifications
Hjerteskud	Credited: Sarah; Released: August 5, 2011; Label: Sony; Format: CD, digital download	1	

=== Singles ===
==== As lead artist ====
(All credited as Sarah)

Title	Year	Peak chart positions	Certifications	Album
Title	Year	DEN	Certifications	Album
"Min øjesten"	2011	1		Hjerteskud
"Engel"	2011	13		Hjerteskud
"Okay"	2011	9		Hjerteskud

=== Other songs ===
(All credited as Sarah)

- 2011: "Når du rør mig"
- 2012: "I Can't"
- 2012: "Tonight We're in Love"

Preceded by Thomas Ring Petersen	X Factor (Denmark); Winner; 2011	Succeeded by Ida Østergaard Madsen
