= Matt White (musician) =

American singer-songwriter

- Born: Matthew White; Englewood, New Jersey, U.S.
- Origin: New York City, U.S.
- Genres: Rock; pop
- Occupation: Singer-songwriter
- Instruments: Vocals; guitar; piano
- Years active: 2006–present
- Labels: Interscope; Rykodisc; Geffen
- Website: Official website

Matt White is an American singer-songwriter. His full-length debut album, Best Days, released by Geffen Records, reached No. 4 on Billboard's Top Heatseekers chart.

== Biography ==
White was born in Englewood, New Jersey and raised in New York City. He began playing the piano at age three and grew up playing classical music. He wrote an opera at age 11. White moved to Wisconsin in 1996 for college and began his singing career. While attending the University of Wisconsin–Madison, he learned to play the guitar when a piano wasn't available. After graduating from college, White moved back to New York City, where he continued busking, singing on street corners and in Washington Square Park. He eventually began performing in clubs like Joe's Pub and the Living Room. A fan sent an MP3 of White's song "Miracles", to an A&R rep at Geffen Records; his music, combined with him having over 50,000 MySpace friends, led to White being offered a recording contract with Geffen. In 2006, White debuted with the EP Do You Believe, selling 100,000 copies. His full-length album, Best Days, was released on September 18, 2007 on Geffen Records. White's music has appeared on the television series One Tree Hill, Laguna Beach: The Real Orange County, What About Brian, The Hills, Men in Trees and in the films She's the Man, Little Manhattan, Shrek the Third, What Happens in Vegas, Because I Said So, Wedding Crashers, Hotel for Dogs and Over Her Dead Body.

== Best Days ==
The album Best Days was released on September 18, 2007. Reception to the music was very positive by music critics and mass audiences alike. A highlight of the album was when White was picked by MTV to be featured on 52 Artist Week Series which was a promotion that MTV ran at the time. White involved his maternal grandmother Shirley Kessleman, who was also one of the first female orchestral leaders in the country. The music video for Best Days stayed on the VH1 Top 20 Video Countdown for 16 weeks reaching number 6 on the Countdown. The album reached #4 on Billboard's New Artist chart and earned him high praises from press. Rolling Stone magazine listed him in their "10 Artists to Watch". Details magazine also added Best Days in their "best new music bubbling from the underground," saying White has "a falsetto smooth enough to melt the icy heart of a Brooklyn hipster."

White has toured extensively and has performed with Sheryl Crow, John Mayer, B.B. King, OneRepublic, Third Eye Blind and Counting Crows. White’s songs have garnered national attention, he played an integral role in The Gap's "Vote For" Initiative campaign, which encouraged Americans to express their ideals and become proactive during the 2008 election. His custom track “Songs of Freedom” became the theme song for campaign and aired on a special electoral episode of The Oprah Winfrey Show. His music has also made a splash nationally in movies and TV shows, such as What Happens in Vegas, Shrek the Third, Because I Said So, The Hills, Men in Trees and One Tree Hill. White took 2009 to write his next record which he said would be mostly piano, and recorded on analog tape.

Recently, Matt White was picked as Facebook's first artist feature with demos from the upcoming album release.

== It's the Good Crazy ==
Matt White's second album It's the Good Crazy was released on September 14, 2010 with 11 tracks.

In December 2012 Matt's song "Love" was the first dance for The Bachelor wedding special with JP and Ashley and he is prominently featured on the "ABC" wedding special.

== Shirley ==
Matt White's third album Shirley was released on August 5, 2013 with 11 tracks.

White also Flew to Munich, Germany to play "Love and Affection" on an episode of "The Bachelorette." The song was threaded through the storyline and shot into the top 25 on iTunes.

White also performed "Love and Affection" on Good Morning America and VH1 morning buzz. Songs from Shirley were also used in "ABC Family's" Pretty Little Liars, The Vampire Diaries and "Fox's" New Girl.

== Greenwich ==
White's fourth album began production in the beginning of 2019 Having spent 2018 writing his album, three of the songs as demos wound up in national commercials. A song White wrote features "Questlove" from The Roots in a Honda commercial. As well as a song featuring White in the Apple iPhone Commercial titled "phases."

== ‘’2019-2021’’ ==
In the last five years, He has had over 200 song syncs in film and television, including 21 in Grey's Anatomy as well as placements in Empire, Lucifer, The Good Doctor, Shameless, Shades of Blue, Pretty Little Liars, Station 19, iZombie, Hand of God, Magnum P.I., Criminal Minds:Beyond Borders, God Friended Me, Love Island, the Bachelor/Bachelorette, So You Think You Can Dance, Blacklist and many others. His music has been featured in trailers/promos/ads for Lloyds Bank, Samsung (Galaxy S10), Ocean's 8, The Rookie, Careful What You Wish For, Netflix's Between, Jeep, Expedia, McDonald’s, and the most recent Uber ads.

== Discography ==
=== Albums ===
- Do You Believe (2003) Self released - debut LP
- Best Days (2007)
- It's the Good Crazy (2010)
- Shirley (2013)
- Love Songs (2012) - EP

=== Singles ===
Year	Title	Chart peak positions	Album
Year	Title	Pop 100	Album
2007	"Best Days"	#19	Best Days

=== Singles ===
Year	Title	Chart peak positions	Album
Year	Title	Disco 100	Album
2021	"Running Away"	#5	Running Away

=== Singles ===
Year	Title	Chart peak positions	Album
Year	Title	Rock 100	Album
2013	"Love and Affection"	#26	Shirley

== Sources ==
Rolling Stone Top Ten Artists to Watch

- Inman, Jeff (January 17, 2008). "Street Corner Superstar: Matt White used to busk in parks; now he’s the new god of love rock". Salt Lake City Weekly. Retrieved on January 22, 2008.
- "Second Cup Café: Matt White". CBS News. August 25, 2007. Retrieved on January 22, 2008.
