= Comme ci comme ça (Basim song) =

Single by Basim featuring Gilli
- Released: 1 September 2017
- Recorded: 2017
- Genre: Pop
- Length: 3:11
- Label: Universal Music Group

Basim singles chronology
"Kostbar" (2015)	"Comme ci comme ça" (2017)	"Aji Aji" (2017)

"Comme ci comme ça" is a song performed by Danish pop singer and songwriter Basim, featuring vocals from Gilli. The song was released as a digital download on 1 September 2017 by Universal Music Group in Denmark. The song has peaked at number 2 on the Danish Singles Chart.

== Critical reception ==
Marlene Jacobsen from Wiwibloggs said, "Basim’s first single since 2015, “Comme Ci Comme Ça” is a spicy mix of hip-hop, Arabic rhythms, RnB and rap. It serves a warm and smooth “Despacito” vibe, but remains something totally its own. Basim’s crisp and confident vocals add to the charm of it all. Working both Danish and Moroccan Arabic, Basim sings about a girl he is ready to commit to. It doesn’t mater what she wants to do — it’s comme ci comme ça — and he just wants her."

== Music video ==
An official music video to accompany the release of "Comme ci comme ça" was first released onto YouTube on 20 September 2017 at a total length of three minutes and twelve seconds.

== Track listing ==
Digital download
No.	Title	Length
1.	"Comme ci comme ça" (feat. Gilli)	3:11

== Charts ==
Chart (2017)	Peak position
Denmark (Tracklisten)	2

== Release history ==
Region	Date	Format	Label
Denmark	1 September 2017	Digital download	Universal Music Group
