= Wrong Side of the Daylight =

Studio album by Thomas Ring Petersen
- Released: 4 March 2011
- Recorded: 2010–11
- Genre: Rock
- Label: RCA / Sony Music Entertainment

Singles from Wrong Side of the Daylight
- 1. "Break the Silence" Released: 8 February 2011; 2. "Leave a Light On" Released: 29 April 2011

Wrong Side of the Daylight is the debut studio album from Danish singer Thomas Ring Petersen, it was released on March 4, 2011, in Denmark. It has peaked to number 2 on the Danish Albums Chart

== Singles ==
- "Break the Silence" was released as the first single on 8 February 2011. It peaked to number 4 on the Danish Singles Chart.
- "Leave a Light On" was released as the second single on 29 April 2011.

== Track listing ==
No.	Title	Length
1.	"Break the Silence"	3:47
2.	"Leave a Light On"	3:43
3.	"Taking the Easy Way Out"	3:51
4.	"Lost In Space"	4:41
5.	"What Stops Us Now?"	3:16
6.	"I'm Still Gonna Write You a Song"	3:13
7.	"Catching Shooting Stars"	2:51
8.	"The Sun, the Moon and the Weather Balloon"	4:00
9.	"Wasted On a Saturday"	3:37
10.	"Song Without a Sound"	3:42
11.	"Valentine"	4:02

== Chart performance ==
On 18 March 2011, Wrong Side of the Daylight entered the Danish Albums Chart at number 2.

Chart (2011)	Peak position
Danish Albums Chart	2

=== Year-end charts ===
Chart (2011)	Position
Danish Albums Chart	29

== Release history ==
Country	Date	Format	Label
Denmark	4 March 2011	Digital download	RCA / Sony Music Entertainment
