= Line (singer) =

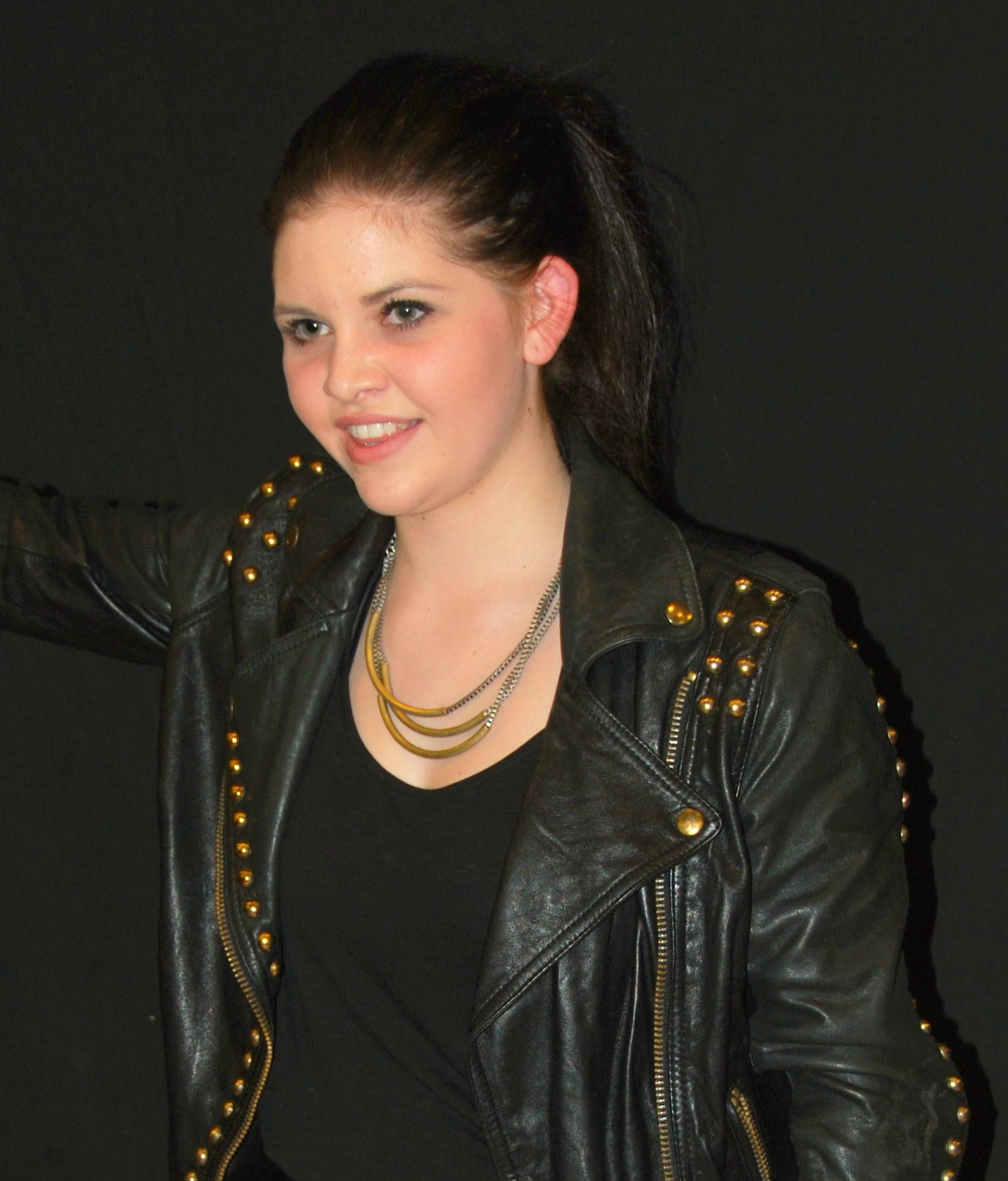
- Line pictured in 2012

Background information
- Also known as: Line
- Born: Line Dissing Karred Larsen; 1 November 1996 (age 29); Skagen, Denmark
- Genres: Pop
- Occupation: Singer
- Instrument: Vocals
- Years active: 2010–present
- Label: Sony Music

Line Dissing Karred Larsen (born 1 November 1996) known as Line (pronounced lee-neh in Danish), is a Danish singer. She was born in Skagen, and took part in season 5 of the Danish X Factor, becoming one of the finalists in the "Under 25" category, mentored by Pernille Rosendahl. On the final held on 23 March 2012, she finished as the runner-up, with 38.3% of the public vote, behind Ida, who carried the title with 61.7%. She was signed to Sony Music, and her debut single "Efter dig" reached No. 3 in the Danish Singles Chart.

== Performances during X Factor ==
Episode	Theme	Song	Artist	Result
Audition	Free choice	""	Lady Gaga	Through to Super Bootcamp
Super Bootcamp	Free choice	""		Through to Bootcamp (Day 1)
Bootcamp (Day 1)	Free choice	""		Through to Bootcamp (Day 2)
Bootcamp (Day 2)	Free choice	"Something From Nothing'"	Aura	Through to Live Shows
Live show 1	Free choice	"Heaven"	Emeli Sandé	Safe (6th)
Live show 2	Danish hits	"Glemmer dig aldrig"	Svenstrup & Vendelboe featuring Nadia Malm	Safe (4th)
Live show 3	Dance hits	"Only Girl (In the World)"	Rihanna	Safe (5th)
Live show 4	Mash-ups	Mercy"/"Rolling in the Deep"/"Bad Romance"/"Crazy	Duffy / Adele / Lady Gaga / Gnarls Barkley	Safe (4th)
Live show 5	Rasmus Seebach songs	"Den jeg er"	Rasmus Seebach	Safe (2nd)
Live show 6 – Semi-final (9 March 2012)	Unplugged (Original artist)	"I'm with You"	Avril Lavigne	Safe (2nd)
Live show 6 – Semi-final (9 March 2012)	Rap (original artist)	"Invincible" (with Yepha)	MGK	Safe (2nd)
Live show 7 – Final (16 March 2012)	Free choice (original artist)	"Skyscraper"	Demi Lovato	Safe (2nd)
Live show 7 – Final (16 March 2012)	Duet with guest artist	"The Spell" (with Alphabeat)	Alphabeat	Safe (2nd)
Live show 7 – Final (16 March 2012)	Winner's song	"Efter Dig"	Line	Runner-up

== After X Factor ==
Immediately after the win, Line released her winning song as her debut single appearing which reached straight to No. 3 in its week of release.

== Discography ==
=== Singles ===
Year	Single	Peak chart positions	Certification	Album
Year	Single	DEN	Certification	Album
2012	"Efter dig"	3	-	TBA
2013	"Brænder Inde (feat Basim)"	–	-	TBA
