= Phoenix (Carpark North album) =

Studio album by Carpark North
- Released: 27 January 2014
- Genre: Electronic rock, alternative rock
- Label: Copenhagen Records/Universal Music

Carpark North chronology
| Best Days (Greatest & Live) (2010) | Phoenix (2014) |

Singles from Phoenix
- 1. "Army of Open Arms" Released: 22 April 2013; 2. "32" Released: 9 September 2013; 3. "You're My Fire" Released: February 2014

Phoenix is a studio album by Danish electronic rock band Carpark North. It was released in Denmark on 27 January 2014 through Copenhagen Records and Universal Music.

== Promotion ==
The first single from the album, "Army of Open Arms", was released on 22 April 2013, and debuted on the Danish Singles Chart at number 21.

The album's second single, "32" featuring singer Stine Bramsen of the Danish pop group Alphabeat, was released on 9 September 2013 and peaked in Denmark at number 5 in January 2014. A lyric video for the song was released on 23 September 2013, with an official music video being released on 28 October 2013.

The third single to promote the album, "You're My Fire" featuring R&B/hip-hop duo Nik & Jay, debuted at number 25 on Danish Singles Chart in February 2014.

== Track listing ==
| No. | Title | Length |
|---|---|---|
| 1. | "Intro" | 1:03 |
| 2. | "Phoenix" | 3:01 |
| 3. | "32" (feat. Stine Bramsen) | 4:10 |
| 4. | "Renegade" | 3:36 |
| 5. | "Just Like Me" (feat. Søren Dahl Jeppesen) | 4:05 |
| 6. | "You're My Fire" (feat. Nik & Jay) | 4:14 |
| 7. | "Better Off Alone" | 3:57 |
| 8. | "I Walk On" | 5:47 |
| 9. | "Copenhagen" | 4:02 |
| 10. | "Army of Open Arms" | 4:50 |
| 11. | "One to Breathe For" | 5:00 |
| 12. | "Brothers" | 3:46 |

== Personnel ==
Carpark North

- Lau Højen – vocals, guitar
- Søren Balsner – bass, synthesisers
- Morten Thorhauge – drums

Additional musicians

- Stine Bramsen – vocals ("32")
- Søren Dahl Jeppesen – vocals ("Just Like Me")
- Nik & Jay – vocals ("You're My Fire")

== Charts ==
| Chart (2014) | Peak position |
|---|---|
| Danish Albums (Hitlisten) | 4 |
