= The Fireflies (Danish group) =

Danish musical group

- Genres: Pop, Country
- Years active: 2010 – ?
- Label: A:larm Music
- Past members: Henriette Andersen; Julia Fabrin Jakobsen; Mathilde Christensen

The Fireflies is a country pop music trio consisting of Henriette Andersen, Julia Fabrin Jakobsen, and Mathilde Christensen. The band was formed by Soulshock, a Danish record producer and songwriter, to compete in the third season of the Danish version of The X Factor. They reached the semi-finals, but were eliminated when they failed to receive enough votes from the Danish public.

== Performances during X Factor ==
Episode	Theme	Song	Artist	Result
Live show 1	Free Choice	"You're Still the One"	Shania Twain	Safe
Live show 2	Michael Jackson	"Human Nature"	Michael Jackson	Safe
Live show 3	Rock	"Wake Me Up When September Ends"	Green Day	Bottom two
Live show 4	UK Number Ones	"Bridge over Troubled Water"	Simon & Garfunkel	Safe
Live show 5	James Bond Associated Of DR Big Band	"For Your Eyes Only"	Sheena Easton	Safe
Live show 6 - Semi-final	Gasoline	"Hvad gør vi nu, lille du"	Gasoline	Eliminated (4th)
Live show 6 - Semi-final	Viewers Choice	"Jolene"	Dolly Parton	Eliminated (4th)

== Discography ==
=== Albums ===
Album Title	Album details	Peak chart positions
Album Title	Album details	DEN
The Fireflies	Released: 18 October 2010; Label: A:larm Music; Format: CD, Digital download	

=== Singles ===
Year	Single	Peak chart positions	Album
Year	Single	DEN	Album
2010	"It's Useless"		The Fireflies
