= Underdog (Ida song) =

Single by Ida

from the album Seize the Day
- Released: 18 March 2013
- Recorded: 2012/13
- Genre: Pop
- Length: 3:27
- Label: Sony Music Entertainment

Ida singles chronology
"I Can Be" (2012)	"Underdog" (2013)	"Maybe I Like It" (2013)

"Underdog" is a single by Danish singer Ida. It was released as a Digital download in Denmark on 18 March 2013. The song has peaked to number 8 on the Danish Singles Chart. The song is included on her debut studio album Seize the Day (2013).

== Track listing ==
Digital download
No.	Title	Length
1.	"Underdog"	3:27

== Chart performance ==
=== Weekly charts ===
Chart (2012)	Peak position
Denmark (Tracklisten)	8

== Release history ==
Region	Date	Format	Label
Denmark	18 March 2013	Digital download	Sony Music Entertainment
