= Maybe I Like It =

Single by Ida

from the album Seize the Day
- Released: 28 October 2013
- Recorded: 2012/13
- Genre: Pop
- Length: 3:34
- Label: Sony Music Entertainment
- Songwriter(s): J-Son, John Ostergaard Madsen, John Mendoza

Ida singles chronology
"Underdog" (2012)	"Maybe I Like It" (2013)

"Maybe I Like It" is a song by Danish singer Ida. It was released as a Digital download in Denmark on 28 October 2013. The song has peaked to number 36 on the Danish Singles Chart. The song is included on her debut studio album Seize the Day (2013).

== Music video ==
A music video to accompany the release of "Maybe I Like It" was first released onto YouTube on 11 November 2013 at a total length of three minutes and thirty-five seconds.

== Track listing ==
Digital download
No.	Title	Length
1.	"Maybe I Like It"	3:34

== Chart performance ==
=== Weekly charts ===
Chart (2012)	Peak position
Denmark (Tracklisten)	36

== Release history ==
Region	Date	Format	Label
Denmark	28 October 2013	Digital download	Sony Music Entertainment
