= 32 (song) =

Single by Carpark North featuring Stine Bramsen

from the album Phoenix
- Released: 9 September 2013
- Recorded: 2013
- Genre: Pop, rock
- Length: 4:10
- Label: Copenhagen Records / Universal Music Denmark
- Songwriter(s): G Yonan, M Torhauge, S Balsner & L Hojen

Carpark North featuring Stine Bramsen singles chronology
"Army of Open Arms" (2013)	"32" (2013)

Music video
- "32" on YouTube

"32" is a 2013 English language single by Danish electro-rock group Carpark North featuring Stine Bramsen from Alphabeat. This is Carpark North's second pre-release from their upcoming 2014 album Phoenix after having released an initial single "Army of Open Arms" from the same album.

== Track listing ==
- "32" (Carpark North feat. Stine Bramsen) - (4:10)

== Charts ==
Chart (2013–14)	Peak position
Denmark (Tracklisten)	5
