= The Best Day =

The Best Day(s) may refer to:

- The Best Day (Thurston Moore album), 2014, or the title song
- The Best Day (Day6 album), 2018
- "The Best Day" (George Strait song), 2000
- "The Best Day" (Taylor Swift song), 2008
- "The Best Day", a short story by Orson Scott Card from the third book in the collection Maps in a Mirror, 1990
- "The Best Days", a 2001 song by Nikki Webster
- The Best Day2, a 2019 album by Day6

== See also ==
- Best Day (disambiguation)
