= In-Joy =

Danish boyband

- Genres: Pop
- Years active: 2010 – 2014
- Past members: Esbjørn Nordby Birch (Essi); Jannick Ricky Fritze; Kevin Sparwath Nielsen; Nabil Moujahid

In-Joy was a Danish boyband that took part in the third season of the Danish X Factor in 2010. The four-member band was made of Esbjørn Nordby Birch (as Essi), Jannick Ricky Fritze, Kevin Sparwath Nielsen and Nabil Moujahid (older brother of the singer Basim), himself an earlier successful X Factor contestant and performer even after the competition.

At the time of the competition (2010), Essi was 25, Nabil 24, Jannick 20 and Kevin 16. Essi was from Aarhus and worked in Post Denmark, Nabil from Høje Gladsaxe and followed a music and dancing career, Jannick from Vejle but lived in Copenhagen and worked as a waiter and finally youngest Kevin from Herlev, a 9th-grade student, but pursuing theatrical studies for seven years at Eventyrteatret, an acting school. The first three had all written songs on their own. All four presented themselves as individual candidates on X Factor, but didn't make the final cut, so Soulshock suggested that they cooperate as a boy band group for the sake of the competition.

The band reached the Final 9 in the Groups category and were mentored by X Factor judge Soulshock (Carsten Schack). In the first live show, they sang Jay Sean's "Down" and in week 2 Michael Jackson song "Remember the Time". As a result, they were eliminated at the end of week 2, coming 8th overall.

At the end of the competition, Nabil Moujahid left the band, but the remaining three continued their music career, releasing their debut single "B.O.O.M" produced by Soulshock & Karlin.

== Discography ==
=== Singles ===
- 2010: "B.O.O.M"
