= My Dream (Thomas song) =

2010 single by Thomas Ring

Single by Thomas Ring Petersen
- Released: 27 March 2010
- Recorded: 2007
- Genre: Pop
- Length: 3:53
- Label: Sony Music
- Songwriter(s): Soulshock; Pernille Rosendahl; Remee; Peter Biker

Thomas Ring Petersen singles chronology
"My Dream" (2010)	"Break the Silence" (2011)

"My Dream" is a 2010 English language debut song by Danish singer Thomas Ring Petersen who won the third Danish series of The X Factor on 27 March 2010. The competition winner's song was written by season's three judges, Soulshock, Pernille Rosendahl and Remee and former News drummer Peter Biker. It describes the journey that the participants have been on. The song was sung by the three finalists Thomas, Tine and Jesper for the finals. The song was released immediately after the broadcast of the finals as a digital download.

== Track listing ==
Digital download
No.	Title	Length
1.	"My Dream"	3:52

== Chart performance ==
On 2 April 2010 the song debuted at number 1 on the Danish Single Chart, staying at the top of the charts for 2 weeks.

Chart (2011)	Peak position
Denmark (Tracklisten)	1

== Release history ==
Region	Date	Format	Label
Denmark	28 March 2010	Digital download	Sony Music Entertainment
