= Babou (singer) =

Danish singer

- Born: Babou Nicolai Nelson Lowe; 7 December 1994 (age 31); Denmark
- Genres: Pop
- Occupation: Singer
- Instrument: Vocals
- Years active: 2005–2015

Babou Nicolai Nelson Lowe (born 7 December 1994), better known by his mononym Babou, is a Danish singer of mixed Danish-Gambian origin. He came third in Danish X Factor in 2011. He has released one album and his single "Supernova" has charted in Denmark, becoming the theme song for season 10 of the Danish version of the reality television series Paradise Hotel.

== Beginnings ==
Babou was born to a Gambian father and a Danish mother. He started very early in music. In the year 2005, only ten years old, he participated in the talent show Scenen er din broadcast on TV 2 coming second for the category "Junior Song". Gaining huge popularity, he released an album of covers titled For Once in My Life.

He was just 12 when his mother, who had been diagnosed with an ongoing mental illness, finally opted to put the young Babou in foster care with foster parents residing in Aarhus.

== In X Factor ==
In 2011, at age 16, he took part in season 4 of the Danish version of the competition The X Factor broadcast on Danish television channel DR1, from 1 January to 25 March 2011 auditioning as a contestant from Aarhus with the song "Cry Me Out" from Pixie Lott. He was put through with the three judges, Cutfather, Pernille Rosendahl and Thomas Blachman. Reaching the Final 9 stage, he was mentored by Cutfather in the "Under 25" category.

Performances during the live shows included:

Date	Week (Stage)	Song choice	Original artist	Theme	Result
11 February 2011	Week 1 (Top 9)	"Just the Way You Are"	Bruno Mars	Free choice	Safe
18 February 2011	Week 2 (Top 8)	"Can't Buy Me Love"	The Beatles	The Beatles songs	Safe
25 February 2011	Week 3 (Top 7)	"De første kærester på månen"	tv.2	Songs from the 2000s	Safe
4 March 2011	Week 4 (Top 6)	"Numb"	Linkin Park	Rock songs	Safe
11 March 2011	Week 5 (Top 5)	"Hurt"	Christina Aguilera	Free choice (with Danish National Chamber Orchestra	Safe
18 March 2011	Week 6 (Top 4)	"DJ Got Us Fallin' in Love"	Usher feat. Pitbull	DJ Night with Rune RK and Kato	Safe
18 March 2011	Week 6 (Top 4)	"Baby"	Justin Bieber	Free choice	Safe
25 March 2011	Week 7 (Final 3)				
25 March 2011	Week 7 (Final 3)	"All the Right Moves"	OneRepublic	Free choice	Third
25 March 2011	Week 7 (Final 3)	"Back to the 80s"	Aqua	Joint song with guests Aqua	Third

Despite heavy speculation he would win the title, he finished third overall, with 26.23% of the popular vote in the Final 3 stage, to winner Sarah Skaalum Jørgensen (or just the mononym Sarah) and runner-up Annelouise.

== After X Factor ==
After staying away a couple of years, Babou came back with a single "Supernova" that has charted on Hitlisten, the official Danish Singles Chart entering the chart at number 8 in its first week of release.

"Supernova" had been written as a promotional theme song for the Danish reality television series Paradise Hotel in its tenth season in 2014. Footage of the venue used for the program as well as some of the participants on the show was used in a music video released for the song.

== Dansk Melodi Grand Prix ==
In 2015, took part in Dansk Melodi Grand Prix in a bid to represent Denmark in the Eurovision Song Contest 2015 with the song "Manjana". He came 5th with 57 points.

== Discography ==
=== Albums ===
Year	Album	Peak positions
Year	Album	DEN
2005	For Once in My Life	–

=== Singles ===
Year	Single	Peak positions
Year	Single	DEN
2014	"Supernova"	8
2015	"Manjana"	—
