= Break the Silence (Thomas Ring song) =

Single by Thomas Ring Petersen

from the album Wrong Side of the Daylight
- Released: 8 February 2011
- Recorded: 2011
- Genre: Rock
- Length: 3:39
- Label: RCA / Sony Music Entertainment

Thomas Ring Petersen singles chronology
"My Dream" (2010)	"Break the Silence" (2011)	"Leave a Light On" (2011)

"Break the Silence" is a single by Danish singer Thomas Ring Petersen, from his debut studio album Wrong Side of the Daylight (2011). It was released on 8 February 2011 as a digital download in Denmark. The song peaked to number 4 on the Danish Singles Chart.

== Track listing ==
Digital download
No.	Title	Length
1.	"Break the Silence"	3:47

== Chart performance ==
Chart (2011)	Peak position
Denmark (Tracklisten)	4

== Release history ==
Region	Date	Format	Label
Denmark	8 February 2011	Digital download	Sony Music Entertainment
