= Ida (singer) =

Danish singer (born 1994)

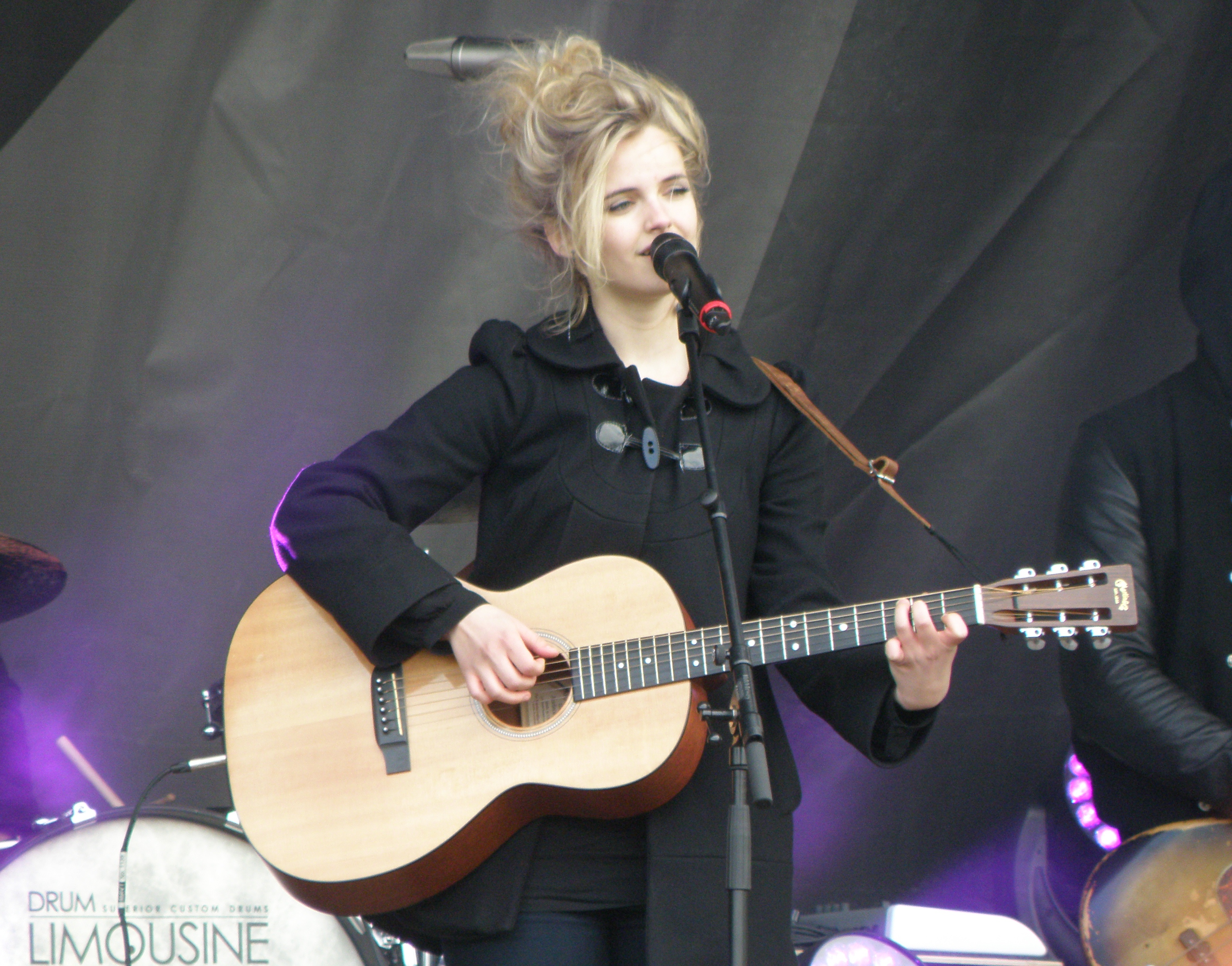

Background information
- Born: Ida Østergaard Madsen; 1994 (age 31–32); Videbæk, Denmark
- Genre: Pop
- Instruments: Vocals, guitar
- Years active: 2012-present

Ida Østergaard Madsen (born 1994) better known by her first name, Ida, is a Danish singer who won season 5 of the Danish X Factor. After she won, she was signed to Sony Music and her debut single "I Can Be" topped the Danish Singles Chart.

== Music career ==
=== 2012: X Factor ===
Ida auditioned for season 5 of The X Factor. She became one of the finalists in the "Under 25" category and was mentored by Pernille Rosendahl. In the final, held on 23 March 2012, she won the title with 61.7% of the popular vote with the other finalist Line as runner-up with 38.3% of the votes. DR pronounced after the finale that IDA had most votes in all of the shows.

==== Performances during X Factor ====
Episode	Theme	Song	Artist	Result
Audition	Free choice	"Lost"	Anouk	Through to Super Bootcamp
Super Bootcamp	Free choice	"Black and Gold"	Sam Sparro	Through to Bootcamp (Day 1)
Bootcamp (Day 1)	Free choice	"Evelyn"	Julie Maria	Through to Bootcamp (Day 2)
Bootcamp (Day 2)	Free choice	"Gravity"	Sara Bareilles	Through to Live Shows
Live show 1	Free choice	"Skinny Love"	Bon Iver	Safe (1st)
Live show 2	Danish hits	"Nothing's Wrong Song"	Ida Gard	Safe (1st)
Live show 3	Dance hits	"Save the World"	Swedish House Mafia	Safe (1st)
Live show 4	Mash-ups	"Fix You" / "Use Somebody"	Coldplay / Kings of Leon	Safe (1st)
Live show 5	Rasmus Seebach songs	"Nangijala"	Rasmus Seebach	Safe (1st)
Live show 6 - Semi-final	Unplugged (Original artist)	"Dream"	Priscilla Ahn	Safe (1st)
Live show 6 - Semi-final	Rap (original artist)	"You've Got the Love" (with KESI)	Florence and the Machine	Safe (1st)
Live show 7 - Final	Free choice (original artist)	"Paradise"	Coldplay	Safe (1st)
Live show 7 - Final	Duet with guest artist	"Ordinary Things" with Lukas Graham	Lukas Graham	Safe (1st)
Live show 7 - Final	Winner's single	"I Can Be"	IDA	Winner

=== 2012-present: Seize the Day ===
Immediately after she won, Ida released her winning song as her debut single "I Can Be", which went straight to number 1 on the Danish Singles Chart in its first week of release and was certified gold. On 18 March 2013 she released the single "Underdog", the song peaked at 8 on the Danish Singles Chart. She features on Mads Langer's song "In These Waters". On 28 October 2013 she released the single "Maybe I Like It", the song peaked at 37 on the Danish Singles Chart. On 18 November 2013 she released her debut studio album Seize the Day, the album peaked at 20 on the Danish Albums Chart.

== Discography ==
=== Albums ===
Title	Album details	Peak chart positions
Title	Album details	DEN
Seize the Day	Released: 18 November 2013; Labels: Sony Music Entertainment; Formats: Digital download, CD	20

=== Singles ===
==== As lead artist ====
Year	Title	Peak chart positions	Certifications	Album
Year	Title	DEN	Certifications	Album
2012	"I Can Be"	1	DEN: Platinum	Seize the Day
2013	"Underdog"	8	DEN: Gold	Seize the Day
2013	"Maybe I Like It"	36		Seize the Day

==== As featured artist ====
Year	Title
2013	"In These Waters" (Mads Langer featuring Ida)

Preceded by Sarah Skaalum Jørgensen	X Factor (Denmark); Winner; 2012	Succeeded by Chresten
