= Best Days (Matt White album) =

Studio album by Matt White
- Released: September 18, 2007
- Label: Geffen

Matt White chronology
Bleecker Street Stories (2006)	Best Days (2007)	It's the Good Crazy (2010)

Best Days is the debut studio album by American songwriter-singer Matt White. The album follows up his 2006 debut EP Bleecker Street Stories. The album was released on September 18, 2007, in the United States. The song "Best Days" was used in the soundtracks to Shrek the Third (as Shrek and Fiona's song) and Hotel for Dogs.

== Track listing ==
1. "Play"
2. "Best Days"
3. "I'll Be There"
4. "Moment of Weakness"
5. "Love"
6. "New York Girls"
7. "Miracles"
8. "Wait for Love"
9. "Anyone Else"
10. "Just What I'm Looking For"
11. "Paradise"

== Charts ==
Chart (2006)	Peak
U.S. Billboard Top Heatseekers Chart	4
