= Befri dig selv =

Studio album by Basim
- Released: 19 October 2009
- Recorded: 2009
- Genre: Pop
- Label: Universal Music Group

Basim chronology
Alt det jeg ville have sagt (2008)	Befri dig selv (2009)	5 (2013)

Singles from Befri dig selv
- 1. "Befri dig selv" Released: 18 September 2009

Befri dig selv is the second studio album by Danish pop singer and songwriter Basim. It was released in Denmark on 19 October 2009. The album peaked at number 21 on the Danish Albums Chart. The album includes the singles "Befri dig selv" and "Baby"

== Singles ==
- "Befri dig selv" was released as the lead single from the album on 18 September 2009.

== Track listing ==
Standard listing
No.	Title	Length
1.	"En Som Dig"	4:02
2.	"I nat"	3:39
3.	"Befri Dig Selv"	3:05
4.	"Vidunderlig Underlig"	3:02
5.	"Nok Af Dig"	3:53
6.	"Lever For Dig"	3:59
7.	"En Enkelt Nat"	3:21
8.	"Basimania"	3:20
9.	"Jeg Vil Være Din"	3:16
10.	"Klimax"	3:51
11.	"Livstegn"	4:10

== Chart performance ==
=== Weekly charts ===
Chart (2009)	Peak position
Danish Albums (Hitlisten)	8

== Release history ==
Region	Release date	Format	Label
Denmark	19 October 2009	Digital Download	Universal Music Group
