= Ta' mig tilbage =

Single by Basim
- Released: 18 February 2011
- Recorded: 2010
- Genre: Pop
- Length: 3:01
- Label: Universal Music Group
- Songwriter(s): Basim, Kim Nowak-Zorde, Lasse Lindorff, D Daniel Fält

Basim singles chronology
"Lad ikke solen gå ned" (2009)	"Ta' mig tilbage" (2011)	"Cliche Love Song" (2014)

"Ta' mig tilbage" is a song by Danish singer Basim. The song was released in Denmark on 18 February 2011 as a digital download on iTunes. The song has peaked to number 30 on the Danish Singles Chart.

== Track listing ==
Digital download
No.	Title	Length
1.	"Ta' Mig Tilbage"	3:44

== Chart performance ==
=== Weekly charts ===
Chart (2011)	Peak position
Denmark (Tracklisten)	30

== Release history ==
Region	Date	Format	Label
Denmark	18 February 2011	Digital download	Universal Music Group
