= Jeg vil =

Single by Basim

from the album Alt det jeg ville have sagt
- Released: October 2008
- Recorded: 2008
- Genre: Pop
- Length: 4:05
- Label: Universal Music Group
- Songwriter(s): Stefan Michael Greering Hoffenberg, Joachim Jensen, Louis Winding

Basim singles chronology
"Alt det jeg ville have sagt" (2008)	"Jeg vil" (2008)	"Baby, jeg savner dig" (2009)

"Jeg vil" is a song by Danish singer Basim. The song was released in Denmark in October 2008 as the second single from his debut studio album Alt det jeg ville have sagt (2008). The song has peaked to number 26 on the Danish Singles Chart.

== Track listing ==
Digital download
No.	Title	Length
1.	"Jeg vil"	4:05

== Chart performance ==
=== Weekly charts ===
Chart (2008)	Peak position
Denmark (Tracklisten)	26

== Release history ==
Region	Date	Format	Label
Denmark	October 2008	Digital download	Universal Music Group
