= Carpark North =

Danish electronic rock band

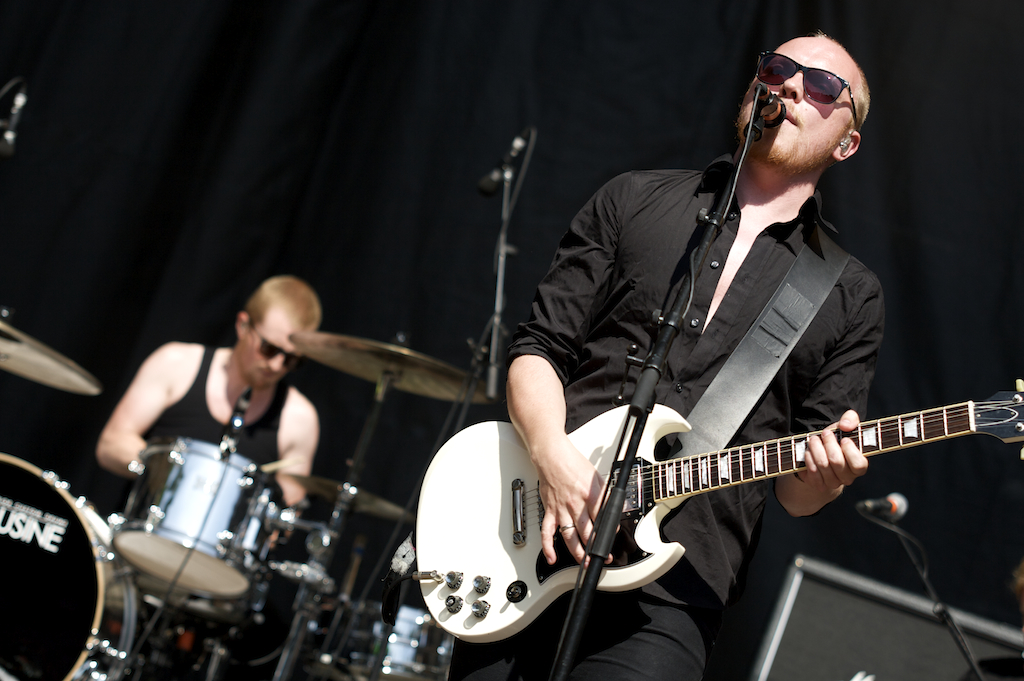

Background information
- Origin: Denmark
- Genres: Electronic rock
- Years active: 1999–present
- Labels: Copenhagen, EMI Medley, Sony Music
- Members: Lau Højen; Søren Balsner; Morten Thorhauge
- Website: www.carparknorth.dk

Carpark North is a Danish electronic rock band. The band was formed in Aarhus, Denmark on 28 July 1999 by Lau Højen (vocal, guitar), Søren Balsner (bass, synthesisers) and Morten Thorhauge (drums). The name "Carpark North" was created from the electro and rock genres: "Carpark" stands for car parks, edges, roughness, metal – the rock part, and "North" stands for northern lights, stars ethereal electronics.

== History ==
The foundation for Carpark North was laid at Mellerup Efterskole, where Søren Balsner and Lau Højen met and formed a band. This band played in the national championship in rock in 1997.

Søren and Lau split up after Mellerup, and Lau started his education at high school – Aarhus Katedralskole. Here he joined a band – "Spacekraft" and met Morten Thorhauge a young drummer from Søften. After a couple of months Lau and Morten formed their own band, and contacted Søren.

The first notes by Carpark North were played on a hot summer day in July 1999 in the MGK-facilities in Aarhus, Denmark.

In January 2010, the band announced that they had been signed internationally by Sony Music.

In 2016, the band released "Unbreakable," the theme song for LEGO's Nexo Knights television series.

== Members ==
- Lau Højen – vocals, guitar
- Søren Balsner – bass, synths, vocals
- Morten Thorhauge – drums

== Awards ==
- Danish Music Awards (2006) – Video of the Year ("Human"), directed by Martin de Thurah
- Robert (2004) – Best Film Score ("Transparent & Glasslike")
- Zulu Award (2003) – Newcomer of the Year
- P3 Guld (2003) – Hit of the Year ("Transparent & Glasslike")
- Gaffa Prisen (2003) – Newcomer of the Year
- P3 Prisen (2001) – Newcomer MP3 Prisen

== Appearances in media ==
- TV show Alias (2005) – with the song "Homeland" from Carpark North.
- Video game FIFA 08 (2007) – with the song "Human" from All Things to All People.
- Film Midsommer (2003) – Carpark North's debut Carpark North was chosen to be the official soundtrack for the film.
- Film Nordkraft (2005)

== Discography ==
=== Studio albums ===
Title	Album details	Peak chart positions
Title	Album details	DEN
Carpark North	Released: 26 February 2003; Label: EMI	1
All Things to All People	Released: 25 April 2005; Label: EMI	4
Grateful	Released: 8 September 2008; Label: Copenhagen Records	5
Lost	Released: 27 August 2010; Label: Sony Music	—
Phoenix	Released: 27 January 2014; Label: Copenhagen Records/Universal Music	4
Hope	Released: 27 October 2017; Label: Copenhagen Records/Universal Music	4
Air	Released: 4 April 2025; Label: United Records/Universal Music	28

=== Compilation albums ===
Title	Album details	Peak chart positions
Title	Album details	DEN
Best Days (Greatest & Live)	Released: 1 November 2010; Label: Copenhagen Records	10

=== EPs ===
- Carstereo (2000) (demo)
- 40 Days EP (2002)

=== Singles ===
Title	Year	Peak chart positions		Album
Title	Year	DEN Singles Chart	DEN P3 Tjeklisten	Album
"There's a Place"	2001	—	—	Non-album single
"40 Days"	2002	—	—	40 Days EP
"Transparent & Glasslike"	2003	24^{[+]}	1	Carpark North
"Wild Wonders"	2003	—	1	Carpark North
"Kiss Me"	2003	—	5	Carpark North
"Human"	2005	9	1	All Things to All People
"Best Day"	2005	—	2	All Things to All People
"Fireworks"	2005	—	8	All Things to All People
"Song About Us" (Live in Copenhagen)	2005	—	—	Non-album single
"The Beasts"	2006	—	4	All Things to All People
"Shall We Be Grateful"	2008	5	2	Grateful
"More"	2008	22	6	Grateful
"Save Me From Myself"	2009	12	2	Grateful
"Leave My Place"	2009	—	17	Grateful
"Lost (Peace)"	2010	—	—	Lost
"Just Human"	2010	—	—	Lost
"Burn It"	2010	27	—	Best Days (Greatest & Live)
"Leave My Place" (re-release)	2011	—	—	Lost
"Everything Starts Again"	2011	34	—	Best Days (Greatest & Live)
"Army of Open Arms"	2013	25	—	Phoenix
"32" (featuring Stine Bramsen)	2013	5	—	Phoenix
"You're My Fire" (featuring Nik & Jay)	2014	22	—	Phoenix
"Renegade"	2014	38	—	Phoenix
"Unbreakable"	2016	—	—	Non-album singles
"Heroes" (with Samu Haber)	2018	—	—	Non-album singles
"If I Were Your King"	2023	—	—	Non-album singles
"—" denotes releases that did not chart.

Notes

- ^{+} – "Transparent & Glasslike" didn't chart on the Danish Singles Chart until in 2009.
