= Alt det jeg ville have sagt =

Single by Basim

from the album Alt det jeg ville have sagt
- Released: 11 August 2008
- Recorded: 2008
- Genre: Pop
- Length: 3:01
- Label: Universal Music Group
- Songwriter(s): Lars Pedersen, Peter Smith

Basim singles chronology
"Alt det jeg ville have sagt" (2008)	"Jeg vil" (2008)

"Alt det jeg ville have sagt" is the debut single by Danish singer Basim. The song was released in Denmark on 11 August 2008, as the lead single from his debut studio album Alt det jeg ville have sagt (2008). The song peaked at number 34 on the Danish Singles Chart.

== Track listing ==
Digital download
No.	Title	Length
1.	"Alt det jeg ville have sagt"	3:07

== Chart performance ==
=== Weekly charts ===
Chart (2008)	Peak position
Denmark (Tracklisten)	34

== Release history ==
Region	Date	Format	Label
Denmark	11 August 2008	Digital download	Universal Music Group
