= I Can Be (Ida song) =

Single by Ida

from the album Seize the Day
- Released: 31 March 2012
- Recorded: 2012
- Genre: Pop
- Length: 3:02
- Label: Sony Music Entertainment
- Songwriter(s): Ida Østergaard Madsen; Søren Andersen; Tobias Stenkjaer

Ida singles chronology
"I Can Be" (2012)	"Underdog" (2013)

"I Can Be" is the debut single by Danish singer Ida who won the fifth Danish series of The X Factor. It was released as a Digital download in Denmark on 31 March 2012. The song entered the Danish Singles Chart at number 1. The song is included on her debut studio album Seize the Day (2013).

== Track listing ==
Digital download
No.	Title	Length
1.	"I Can Be"	3:02

== Chart performance ==
=== Weekly charts ===
Chart (2012)	Peak position
Denmark (Tracklisten)	1

== Release history ==
Region	Date	Format	Label
Denmark	31 March 2012	Digital download	Sony Music Entertainment
