= Thomas Ring =

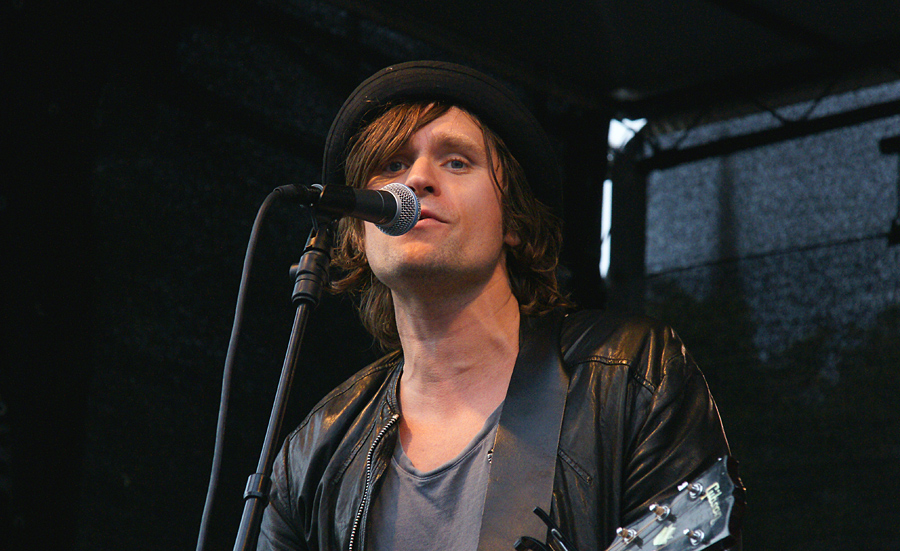

Background information
- Born: Thomas Ring Petersen; 17 February 1980 (age 45)
- Origin: Copenhagen, Denmark
- Genres: Pop, Rock
- Occupation: Singer
- Instrument: Vocals
- Years active: 2010–present

Thomas Ring Petersen (born 17 February 1980), better known as Thomas Ring or simply as Thomas, is a Danish singer who rose to fame as the winner of the third Danish series of The X Factor.

Thomas started as table tennis player reaching the national level by the age of 17. When he turned 18, he got a guitar for birthday and Christmas present from his parents, Berit and Ib. He soon started writing lyrics and music leaving table tennis. He graduated from Falkonergårdens Gymnasium and is a qualified teacher at Københavns Dag- og Aftenseminarium (KDAS).

In 2017, Thomas competed in Dansk Melodi Grand Prix 2017 with the song, "Vesterbro", but he did not advance to the superfinal.

== Performances during X Factor ==
Episode	Theme	Song	Artist	Result
Live show 1	Free Choice	"Viva La Vida"	Coldplay	Safe
Live show 2	Michael Jackson	"Man in the Mirror"	Michael Jackson	Safe
Live show 3	Rock	"When You Where Young"	The Killers	Safe
Live show 4	UK Number Ones	"Mad World"	Michael Andrews & Gary Jules	Safe
Live show 5	James Bond Associated Of DR Big Band	"You Know My Name"	Chris Cornell	Safe
Live show 6 – Semi-final	Gasolin	"Langebro"	Gasolin	Safe
Live show 6 – Semi-final	Viewers Choice	"Karma Police"	Radiohead	Safe
Live show 7 – Final	Free choice	"With or Without You"	U2	Safe
Live show 7 – Final	Duet with guest artist	"Ensom" with Medina	Medina	Safe
Live show 7 – Final	Winner's single	"My Dream"	Thomas	Winner

== Discography ==
=== Albums ===
Album Title	Album details	Peak chart positions
Album Title	Album details	DEN
Wrong Side of the Daylight	Released: 4 March 2011; Label: Sony Music Entertainment; Format: CD, Digital download	2
Sideways	Released: April 2011; Label: Sony Music Entertainment; Format: CD, Digital download	24
Gadedreng	Released: 17 February 2017; Label: Sony Music Entertainment; Format: Digital download	–

=== Singles ===
Year	Single	Peak chart positions	Album
Year	Single	DEN	Album
2010	"My Dream"	1	Non-album single
2011	"Break the Silence"	4	Wrong Side of the Daylight
2011	"Leave a Light On"	—	Wrong Side of the Daylight
2013	"The Fire Still Burns"	—	Sideways
2016	"Mit Danmark"	—	Gadedreng
2016	"Stjernekaster"		Gadedreng
2017	"Vesterbro"	—	Gadedreng

Preceded by Linda Andrews	X Factor (Denmark); Winner; 2010	Succeeded by Sarah Skaalum Jørgensen
