= Grateful (Carpark North album) =

Studio album by Carpark North
- Released: 8 September 2008
- Genre: Electronic rock
- Length: 43:00
- Label: Copenhagen Records

Carpark North chronology
All Things to All People (2005)	Grateful (2008)	Lost (2010)

Singles from Grateful
- 1. "Shall We Be Grateful" Released: 2008; 2. "More" Released: 2008; 3. "Save Me from Myself" Released: 2009; 4. "Leave My Place" Released: 2009

Grateful is the third studio album by Danish electronic rock band Carpark North, released on 8 September 2008. The album has spawned four singles: "Shall We Be Grateful", "More", "Save Me from Myself" and "Leave My Place". The song "Save Me from Myself" was covered by Brazilian Christian rock band Oficina G3 and Christian musician Michael W. Smith.

In late 2006 the band started building their own recording studio "Yderlandet" in Copenhagen, and began to work on their third album. Around the same time Carpark North left EMI for a Danish independent label, Copenhagen Records, to have total control over their sound. In mid 2007 they were contacted by American producer Brian Sperber (Moby, Julian Casablancas), who wanted to produce their next release. Sperber joined the production mid-way and finished the songs together with mixing the album.

The album was certified platinum in Denmark and became their most successful release to date. 'The title, Grateful, suddenly made more and more sense to us, 'cause we WERE really amazed by the success gained from this album. During those months we were in a constant state of gratefulness,' said the band's vocalist Lau Højen.

== Track listing ==
No.	Title	Length
1.	"More"	3:26
2.	"Shall We Be Grateful"	3:24
3.	"Save Me from Myself"	4:04
4.	"Leave My Place"	4:37
5.	"Lost (Peace)"	4:12
6.	"Last Song"	3:51
7.	"The Everlasting Tie"	3:57
8.	"Within My Reach"	4:00
9.	"Bring the Lights"	3:16
10.	"Cancer"	4:00
11.	"Shutdown"	4:13

== Charts ==
Chart (2008)	Peak position
Danish Albums (Hitlisten)	5
