= Høje Gladsaxe =

Coordinates: 55°43′45″N 12°29′30″E

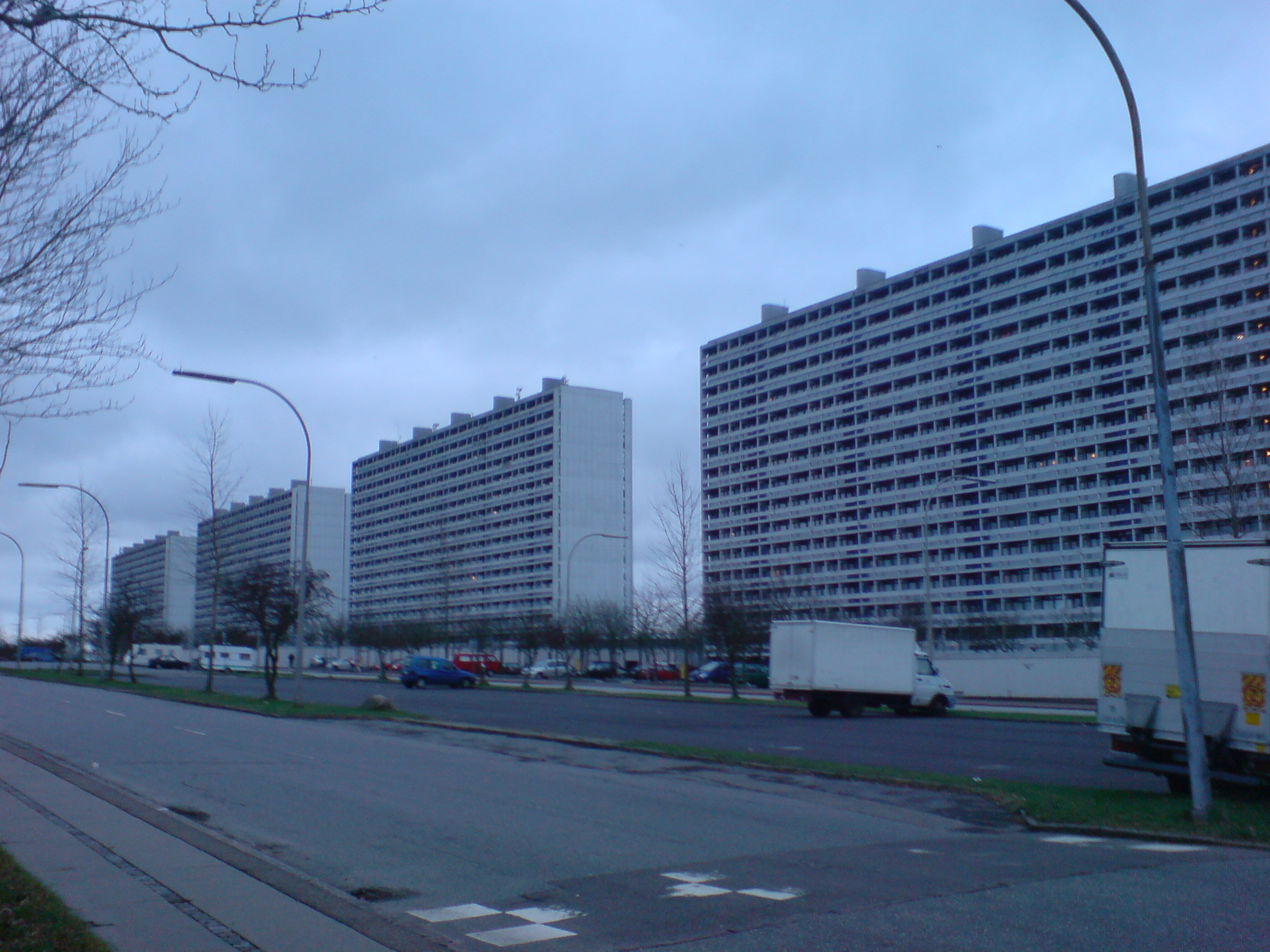
Høje Gladsaxe

Høje Gladsaxe is a large housing project, approximately 10 km northwest of central Copenhagen, Denmark. The project contains five 15-storey blocks, two 8-storey blocks and some smaller blocks. It contains around 2,500 apartments. The project was finished in 1966.

== Notable people ==
- Anis Basim Moujahid (born 1992), stage name Basim, a Danish pop singer and songwriter; of Moroccan origin, but lives in Høje Gladsaxe,
