= Carpark North (album) =

Studio album by Carpark North
- Released: 26 February 2003
- Recorded: Puk Studios, Randers, Denmark
- Genre: Rock
- Length: 42:53
- Label: EMI
- Producer: Joshua, Carpark North

Carpark North chronology
Carpark North (2003)	All Things to All People (2005)

Singles from Carpark North
- 1. "Transparent & Glasslike" Released: 2003; 2. "Wild Wonders" Released: 2003; 3. "Kiss Me" Released: 2003

Professional ratings
Review scores
Source	Rating
Gaffa	5/6 stars

Carpark North is the debut album by Danish electronic rock band Carpark North. It was released on 10 February 2003.

Two songs from the album were previously released: "There's a Place" in 2001 on the airwaves of Danish national radio, and "40 Days" on Carpark North's 40 Days EP.

The album was used as a soundtrack for the Danish teen-horror hit movie "Midsommer". The first single from the album, "Transparent & Glasslike" was an instant hit on the radio, and the album sold 10,000 units the first week. Over the following months the debut was certified platinum in Denmark, and the following Danish tour was sold out.

In 2005, the song "Homeland" was used in the hit American TV series Alias.

== Track listing ==
No.	Title	Length
1.	"Homeland"	5:10
2.	"Transparent & Glasslike"	3:36
3.	"There's a Place"	4:24
4.	"I and You"	5:21
5.	"In the Dark"	2:28
6.	"Kiss Me"	4:51
7.	"40 Days"	3:07
8.	"Wild Wonders"	3:54
9.	"Spain"	4:25
10.	"The Last End"	6:25

== Charts ==
Chart (2003)	Peak position
Danish Albums (Hitlisten)	1
