= All Things to All People =

Studio album by Carpark North
- Released: 25 April 2005
- Genre: Rock
- Length: 43:53
- Label: EMI
- Producer: Joshua

Carpark North chronology
Carpark North (2003)	All Things to All People (2005)	Grateful (2008)

Singles from All Things to All People
- 1. "Human" Released: 2005; 2. "Best Day" Released: 2005; 3. "Fireworks" Released: 2005; 4. "The Beasts" Released: 2006

Professional ratings
Review scores
Source	Rating
Gaffa	4/6 stars

All Things to All People is the second studio album by Danish electronic rock band Carpark North. It was recorded in the early 2005 and released on 25 April 2005 through EMI. The idea behind the album was to "make the rock more hard and the electro more sparkling".

== Promotion ==
"Human", the first single from the album, was accompanied by a powerful video by Danish director Martin de Thurah, which won several awards: a DMA (Danish Grammy) in 2006 for "Best video of the Year", "Best Music Video" at RESFEST, Los Angeles, a "Grand Prix" at the Festival International des Art du Clip in Provence, and was also exhibited at an art museum in Ontario, Canada. The video received a lot of attention worldwide and was the stepping-stone for Carpark North to an international audience.

The single Human was later featured in the worldwide hit game FIFA 08, and the second single "Best Day" was the third most played song on Danish radio in 2005. The song "Rest" was used in the 2005 Danish film Nordkraft.

== Track listing ==
No.	Title	Length
1.	"Berlin"	4:00
2.	"Human"	2:32
3.	"Best Day"	4:27
4.	"Fireworks"	4:21
5.	"Run"	4:35
6.	"Song About Us"	4:10
7.	"Newborn"	3:19
8.	"Rest"	5:07
9.	"The Beasts"	6:36
10.	"Heart of Me"	4:46

== Charts ==
Chart (2005)	Peak position
Danish Albums (Hitlisten)	4
