= Basim (singer) =

Danish singer (born 1992)

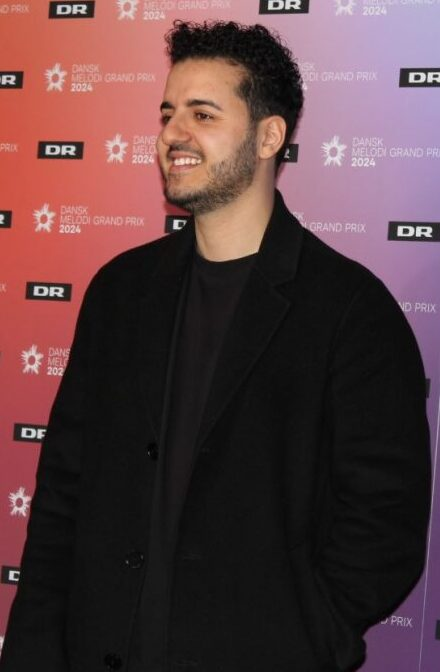
- Basim at Dansk Melodi Grand Prix 2024

Background information
- Born: Anis Basim Moujahid; 4 July 1992 (age 33); Copenhagen, Denmark
- Genres: Pop
- Occupation: Singer
- Instrument: Vocals
- Years active: 2008–present
- Labels: Universal

Anis Basim Moujahid (born 4 July 1992), better known as Basim, is a Danish pop singer and songwriter. He is of Moroccan origin. He has released two albums, Alt det jeg ville have sagt in 2008 and Befri dig selv in 2009. Basim represented Denmark in the Eurovision Song Contest 2014 on home ground in Copenhagen, Denmark with the song "Cliche Love Song". The following year he was the Danish spokesperson at Eurovision.

== Career ==
=== 2008: The X Factor and Alt det jeg ville have sagt ===
Aged 15, he took part in the 2008 edition of the talent program The X Factor and reached the quarterfinals before being voted out. After X Factor, Basim released his debut album in 2008 entitled Alt det jeg ville have sagt (meaning "Everything I would have said"). For the album, he collaborated with Danish X Factor judge Remee and engaged on a tour in the country. The album reached No. 8 in the Danish Albums Chart going gold. There were three singles from the album, "Alt det jeg ville have sagt", "Jeg vil" and "Baby, jeg savner dig".

=== Performances during X Factor ===
| Episode | Theme | Song | Artist | Result |
|---|---|---|---|---|
| Audition | Free Choice | "I Believe I Can Fly" | R. Kelly | Through to Bootcamp (Day 1) |
| Bootcamp (Day 1) | Free Choice | | | Through to Bootcamp (Day 2) |
| Bootcamp (Day 2) | Free Choice | "I Believe I Can Fly" | R. Kelly | Through to Live Shows |
| Live show 1 | Hits from the Tjeklist | "Du Kan Gøre Hvad Du Vil" | Christian Brøns | Safe |
| Live show 2 | FilmHits | "You Are the Music in Me" | Zac Efron and Vanessa Hudgens featuring Olesya Rulin | Safe |
| Live show 3 | Disco | "Celebration" | Kool & the Gang | Safe |
| Live show 4 | Sing Danish | "Tænder på dig" | Jakob Sveistrup | Safe |
| Live show 5 | BigBand | "Can't Take My Eyes Off You" | Frankie Valli | Bottom two |
| Live show 6 | Anne Linnet | "Glor på Vinduer" | Anne Linnet | Eliminated (4th) |
| Live show 6 | Elvis Presley | "Always on My Mind" | Elvis Presley | Eliminated (4th) |

=== 2009–2010: Befri dig selv and reality shows ===
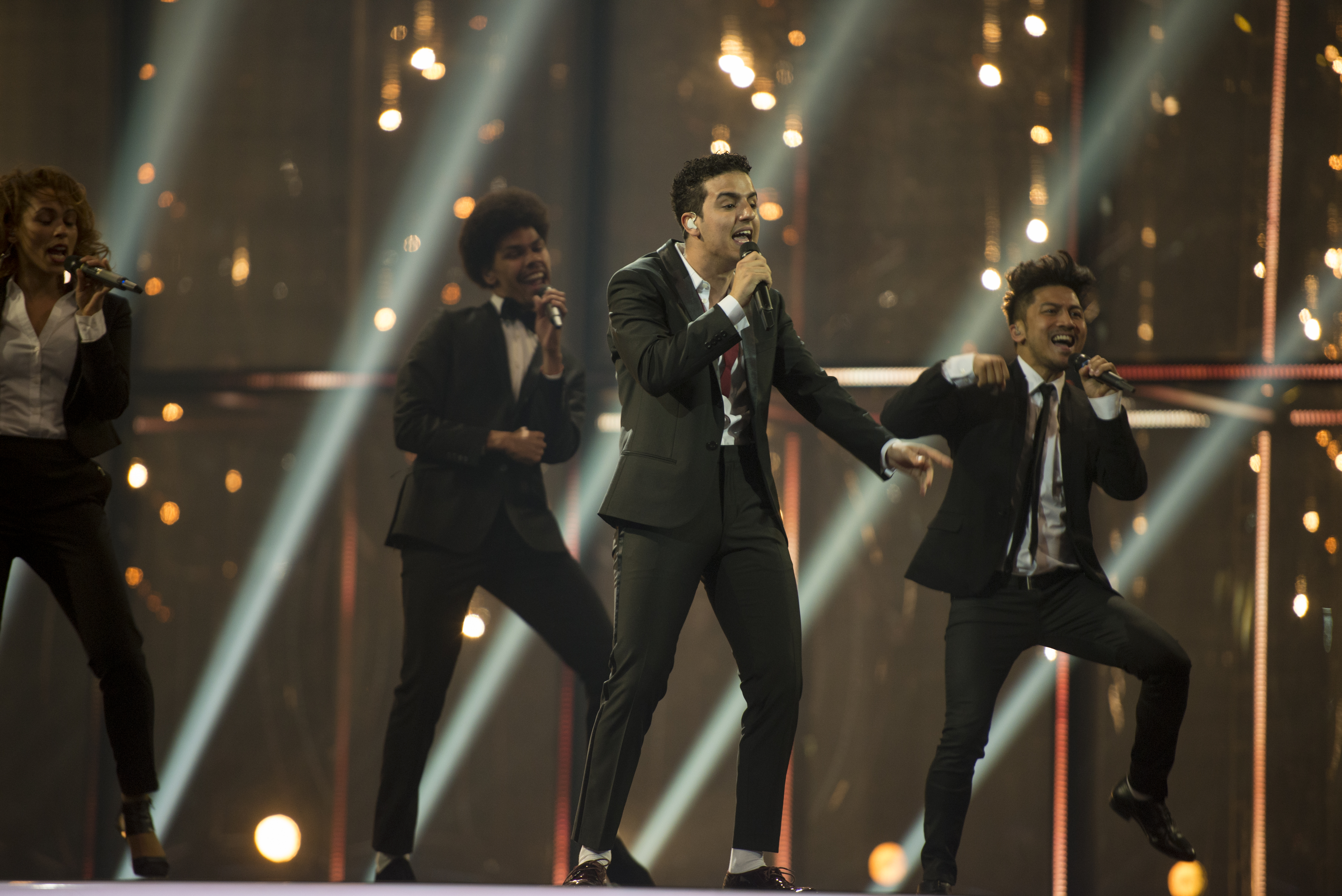
Basim on the stage of Eurovision 2014

In October 2009, he released his second album Befri dig selv (in Danish "Free yourself"). The album reached No. 21 on the Danish Albums Chart and saw release of two singles "Lad ikke solen gå ned" (reaching No. 15 in the Danish Singles Chart) and title track "Befri dig selv". Basim has also participated in the 2009 edition of Vild med dans, the Danish edition of Dancing with the Stars, where he danced with Claudia Rex, finishing 9th. He also competed on the Scandinavian version of Wipeout in 2010, however failed to make it past the Qualifier.

=== 2014–present: Eurovision Song Contest ===
On 8 March 2014, Basim won Dansk Melodi Grand Prix 2014 (the Danish qualification for Eurovision) with "Cliche Love Song". Basim represented Denmark in the Eurovision Song Contest 2014. He performed 23rd in the final and ultimately placed 9th, scoring 74 points. The following year Basim was the Danish spokesperson at the Eurovision Song Contest 2015 in Vienna. He was one of the contestants of Dansk Melodi Grand Prix 2024 with the song "Johnny". but came 2nd in the superfinal.

== Personal life ==
Basim is the son of Abdel Moujahid and his wife Zohra. His father, Abdel, suffered from cancer. Basim's rendition on the album Alt det jeg ville have sagt entitled Himlen Har Alt For Mange Engle ("Heaven Has Too Many angels") was dedicated to his father who died in 2012.

Basim's older brother Nabil Moujahid took part in the 2010 edition (third season) of the Danish X Factor as part of the group formation In-Joy. The four-member formation also including Essi, Jannick and Kevin was one of the nine finalists during the show. However In-Joy was eliminated at the end of the second week of the live shows of the competition finishing eighth overall.

== Discography ==
=== Studio albums ===
| Title | Details | Peak positions |
| Title | Details | DEN |
|---|---|---|
| Alt det jeg ville have sagt | Released: 13 October 2008; Label: Universal; Format: Digital download, CD | 8 |
| Befri dig selv | Released: 19 October 2009; Label: Universal; Format: Digital download, CD | 21 |

=== Extended plays ===
Title
5 (EP)
Details
- Released: 8 February 2013
- Label: Sony Music Entertainment
- Format: Digital download, CD
Notes

| No. | Title | Length |
|---|---|---|
| 1. | "Hjerteslag" | 4:16 |
| 2. | "Mayday" | 4:04 |
| 3. | "Stjæler mit hjerte" | 4:08 |
| 4. | "Kun et liv" | 4:14 |
| 5. | "Min verden" | 3:21 |
| 6. | "Ta' mig tilbage" | 4:09 |

=== Singles ===
| Single | Year | Peak chart positions | | | | | | | | | | Album |
| Single | Year | DEN | AUT | BE (Fl) Tip | BEL (Wa) Tip | GER | IRE | NL | SWE | SWI | UK | Album |
|---|---|---|---|---|---|---|---|---|---|---|---|---|
| "Alt det jeg ville have sagt" | 2008 | 34 | — | — | — | — | — | — | — | — | — | Alt det jeg ville have sagt |
| "Jeg vil" | 2008 | 26 | — | — | — | — | — | — | — | — | — | Alt det jeg ville have sagt |
| "Baby, jeg savner dig" | 2009 | — | — | — | — | — | — | — | — | — | — | Alt det jeg ville have sagt |
| "Befri dig selv" | 2009 | — | — | — | — | — | — | — | — | — | — | Befri dig selv |
| "Lad ikke solen gå ned" (with Lis Sørensen) | 2009 | 15 | — | — | — | — | — | — | — | — | — | Befri dig selv |
| "Ta' mig tilbage" | 2011 | 30 | — | — | — | — | — | — | — | — | — | Non-album singles |
| "Cliche Love Song" | 2014 | 2 | 37 | 68 | 46 | 50 | 38 | 71 | 9 | 55 | 46 | Melodi Grand Prix 2014 |
| "Picture in a Frame" | 2014 | — | — | — | — | — | — | — | — | — | — | Non-album singles |
| "Kostbar" | 2015 | — | — | — | — | — | — | — | — | — | — | Non-album singles |
| "Comme ci comme ça" (featuring Gilli) | 2017 | 2 | — | — | — | — | — | — | — | — | — | Non-album singles |
| "Aji Aji" | 2017 | 6 | — | — | — | — | — | — | — | — | — | Non-album singles |
| "Tilfældigt" (featuring Benny Jamz) | 2018 | 7 | — | — | — | — | — | — | — | — | — | Non-album singles |
| "Tanker" | 2018 | 32 | — | — | — | — | — | — | — | — | — | Non-album singles |
| "Umuligt" | 2018 | — | — | — | — | — | — | — | — | — | — | Non-album singles |
| "Lov mig" | 2019 | — | — | — | — | — | — | — | — | — | — | Non-album singles |
| "La historia" | 2019 | — | — | — | — | — | — | — | — | — | — | Non-album singles |
| "Du gør det godt" (featuring Johnson and Hedegaard) | 2021 | 22 | — | — | — | — | — | — | — | — | — | Paradise Hotel 2021 |
| "Versace badekåber" (with Skinz) | 2022 | — | — | — | — | — | — | — | — | — | — | Non-album singles |
| "Det er mig der står herude og banker på" | 2022 | — | — | — | — | — | — | — | — | — | — | Non-album singles |
| "Bye Bye" (featuring $hybxi) | 2022 | — | — | — | — | — | — | — | — | — | — | Non-album singles |
| "Hvem er de?!" (with Jimilian) | 2022 | — | — | — | — | — | — | — | — | — | — | Non-album singles |
| "Johnny" | 2024 | — (Note: "Johnny" did not enter the official Track Top 40 chart, but peaked at No. 8 on the Airplay Top 20 chart.) | — | — | — | — | — | — | — | — | — | Melodi Grand Prix 2024 |
"—" denotes a single that did not chart or was not released.

=== Music videos ===
| Year | Title | Reference |
|---|---|---|
| 2008 | "Jeg vil" | |
| 2009 | "Befri dig selv" | |
| 2011 | "Ta' mig tilbage" | |
