= Denmark in the Eurovision Song Contest 2020 =

- Eurovision Song Contest 2020
- Country: Denmark
- Selection process: Dansk Melodi Grand Prix 2020
- Selection date: 7 March 2020

Competing entry
- Song: "Yes"
- Artist: Ben and Tan
- Songwriters: Emil Lei; Jimmy Jansson; Linnea Deb

Placement
- Final result: Contest cancelled

Participation chronology

Denmark was set to be represented at the Eurovision Song Contest 2020 with the song "Yes" written by Emil Lei, Jimmy Jansson and Linnea Deb. The song was performed by the duo Ben and Tan. The Danish broadcaster DR organised the national final Dansk Melodi Grand Prix 2020 in order to select the Danish entry for the 2020 contest in Rotterdam, Netherlands. The national selection consisted of a radio semi-final and a televised final. In the final, the winner was selected over two rounds of voting. The results of the first round were decided upon through the combination of jury voting and public voting while in the second round, the winner was selected solely by public televoting. "Yes" performed by Ben and Tan was the winner after gaining 61% of the public vote.

Denmark was drawn to compete in the second semi-final of the Eurovision Song Contest which took place on 14 May 2020. However, the contest was cancelled due to the COVID-19 pandemic.

== Background ==
Prior to the 2020 contest, Denmark had participated in the Eurovision Song Contest forty-eight times since their first entry in 1957. Denmark had won the contest, to this point, on three occasions: in 1963 with the song "Dansevise" performed by Grethe and Jørgen Ingmann, in 2000 with the song "Fly on the Wings of Love" performed by Olsen Brothers, and in 2013 with the song "Only Teardrops" performed by Emmelie de Forest. In the 2019 contest, "Love Is Forever" performed by Leonora qualified Denmark to the final, where it placed twelfth.

The Danish national broadcaster, DR, broadcasts the event within Denmark and organises the selection process for the nation's entry. DR confirmed their intentions to participate at the 2020 Eurovision Song Contest on 25 May 2019. Denmark has selected all of their Eurovision entries thus far through the national final Dansk Melodi Grand Prix. Along with their participation confirmation, the broadcaster announced that Dansk Melodi Grand Prix 2020 would be organised in order to select Denmark's entry for the 2020 contest.

== Before Eurovision ==
=== Dansk Melodi Grand Prix 2020 ===
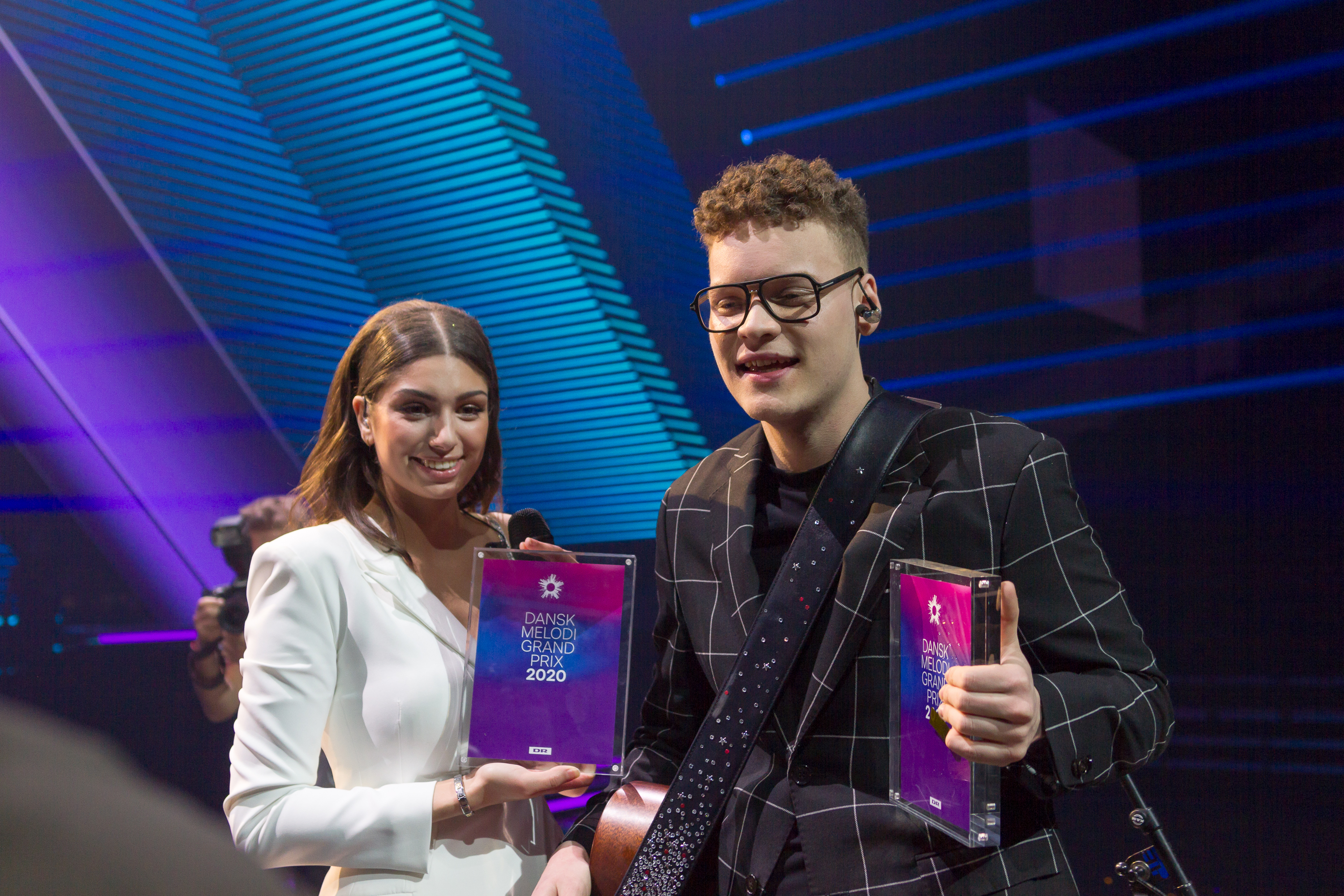
Ben and Tan at Dansk Melodi Grand Prix 2020

Dansk Melodi Grand Prix 2020 was the 50th edition of Dansk Melodi Grand Prix, the music competition that selects Denmark's entries for the Eurovision Song Contest. The event consisted of a radio semi-final held between 20 and 24 January 2020 followed by a final held on 7 March 2020. The final was televised on DR1 as well as streamed online at DRTV.

==== Format ====
Nine songs competed in a semi-final which consisted of three regional groups of three songs. The winner of each group as determined exclusively by an online public vote by listeners of DR P4 qualified to the final, while a nine-member jury panel composed of members from the nine regional DR P4 stations selected two wildcards out of the remaining non-qualifying songs for the final. Ten songs consisting of the five semi-final qualifiers and five pre-qualified songs competed in the final where the winner was determined over two rounds of voting. In the first round, the top three songs based on the combination of votes from a public vote and a five-member jury panel qualified to the superfinal. In the superfinal, the winner was determined exclusively by a public vote. Viewers were able to vote via SMS or a mobile application specifically designed for the competition. Viewers using the app to cast a vote were provided with one free vote.

==== Competing entries ====
DR opened a submission period on 2 October 2019 for artists and composers to submit their entries. Entries could be submitted throughout the year, however only songs submitted by 1 November 2019 were considered for the 2020 edition of the competition. The broadcaster received 600 entries during the submission period. The regional DR P4 jury selected nine songs for the semi-final from the entries submitted to the broadcaster, while a selection committee of industry professionals selected the five pre-qualified songs for the final. The competing artists and songs in the semi-final were announced on 20 January 2020, while the five pre-qualified finalist acts were announced and officially presented on 31 January 2020. Among the competing artists was RoxorLoops who represented Belgium in the Eurovision Song Contest 2011 as part of the group Witloof Bay.

The regional DR P4 jury was composed of:

- Sebastian Lind (P4 Fyn)
- Jacob Hansen (P4 Syd)
- Søren Krogh (P4 Trekanten)
- Bryan Rice (P4 Sjælland)
- Jonas Petersen (P4 København)
- James Benedict Thomas (P4 Bornholm)
- Laura Mo (P4 Nordjylland)
- Julie Berthelsen (P4 Østjylland)
- Marie Frank (P4 Midt & Vest)

Artist	Song	Songwriter(s)
Ben and Tan	"Yes"	Emil Lei, Jimmy Jansson, Linnea Deb
Benjamin Kissi	"Faith"	Benjamin Kissi, Frederik Tao Nordsøe Schjoldan, Gisli Gislason
Emil	"Ville ønske jeg havde kendt dig"	Esben Svane, Emil Vestergaard Klausen, Gavyn Bailey, Tim Schou
Isam B	"Bølger"	Babak Vakili, Isam Bachiri, Morten Woods
Jamie Talbot	"Bye Bye Heaven"	Tom Oehler, Hampus Eurenius, Aron Blom
Jasmin Rose feat. RoxorLoops	"Human"	Erik Smaaland, Gavin Jones, Grace Risch, Lise Cabble
Kenny Duerlund	"Forget It All"	Henrik Tala, Mila Falls, Patrik Jean, Kenny Duerlund
Maja og de Sarte Sjæle	"Den eneste goth i Vejle"	Timo Mastrup-Andersen
Mielou	"We Could Be So Beautiful"	Thomas Reil, Jeppe Reil, Bruce R. F. Smith, Eric Lumiere
Nick Jones	"2AM"	Jon Hällgren, Lukas Hällgren, Hampus Eurenius, George Keller
Samsara	"For You"	Lars 'Chief 1' Pedersen, Remee, Kwamie Liv, Sara Amalie Gerup
Sander Sanchez	"Screens"	Jonas Thander, Liam Craig, Christopher Wortley
Søren Okholm	"Impossible Dreamers"	Tobias Stigaard Stenkjær, Peter Jantzen, Nanna Supriya Wedel, Søren Fynbo Okholm
Sys Bjerre	"Honestly"	Lasse Lyngbo, Sys Bjerre

==== Semi-final ====
Listeners of DR P4 were able to cast one vote per group on the official DR website each day between 20 and 24 January 2020. The song with the most votes in each group that advanced to the final were announced on 24 January 2020, while the two wildcards selected by the regional DR P4 jury were announced on 31 January 2020.

Semi-final – 20–24 January 2020
Region	Artist	Song	Result
Southern Denmark	Jamie Talbot	"Bye Bye Heaven"	Wildcard
Southern Denmark	Kenny Duerlund	"Forget It All"	Advanced
Southern Denmark	Nick Jones	"2AM"	—N/a
Eastern Denmark	Samsara	"For You"	—N/a
Eastern Denmark	Søren Okholm	"Impossible Dreamers"	—N/a
Eastern Denmark	Ben and Tan	"Yes"	Advanced
Northern Denmark	Emil	"Ville ønske jeg havde kendt dig"	Wildcard
Northern Denmark	Sander Sanchez	"Screens"	Advanced
Northern Denmark	Mielou	"We Could Be So Beautiful"	—N/a

==== Final ====
The final took place on 7 March 2020 at the Royal Arena in Copenhagen, hosted by Hella Joof and Rasmus Bjerg. Due to the emerging COVID-19 pandemic, the show took place with no live audience being admitted. For the first time since 1999, a live orchestra was used in the final; the Antonelli Orchestra accompanied each performance in varying capacities. The running order was determined by DR and announced on 4 March 2020. In the first round of voting the top three advanced to the superfinal based on the votes of a five-member jury (50%) and a public vote (50%). The five-member jury panel was composed of: Pelle Peter Jencel (radio host on DR P3), Mich Hedin Hansen (songwriter and music producer), Ida Corr (singer), Lasse Kramhøft (music producer) and Nicolai Molbech (radio host and DJ). In the superfinal, the winner, "Yes" performed by Ben and Tan, was selected solely by a public vote. In addition to the performances of the competing entries, Wafande and Danish Eurovision 1961 entrant Dario Campeotto performed as the interval acts.

Final – 7 March 2020
R/O	Artist	Song	Result
1	Isam B	"Bølger"	—N/a
2	Ben and Tan	"Yes"	Advanced
3	Maja og de Sarte Sjæle	"Den eneste goth i Vejle"	—N/a
4	Benjamin Kissi	"Faith"	—N/a
5	Emil	"Ville ønske jeg havde kendt dig"	Advanced
6	Sys Bjerre	"Honestly"	—N/a
7	Jamie Talbot	"Bye Bye Heaven"	—N/a
8	Sander Sanchez	"Screens"	Advanced
9	Kenny Duerlund	"Forget It All"	—N/a
10	Jasmin Rose feat. RoxorLoops	"Human"	—N/a

Superfinal – 7 March 2020
R/O	Artist	Song	Televote	Place
1	Ben and Tan	"Yes"	61%	1
2	Emil	"Ville ønske jeg havde kendt dig"	19%	3
3	Sander Sanchez	"Screens"	20%	2

==== Ratings ====
Viewing figures by show
Show	Date	Viewers	Ref.
Final	7 March 2020	1,194,000	

== At Eurovision ==
According to Eurovision rules, all nations with the exceptions of the host country and the "Big Five" (France, Germany, Italy, Spain and the United Kingdom) are required to qualify from one of two semi-finals in order to compete for the final; the top ten countries from each semi-final progress to the final. The European Broadcasting Union (EBU) split up the competing countries into six different pots based on voting patterns from previous contests, with countries with favourable voting histories put into the same pot. On 28 January 2020, a special allocation draw was held which placed each country into one of the two semi-finals, as well as which half of the show they would perform in. Denmark was placed into the second semi-final, to be held on 14 May 2020, and was scheduled to perform in the second half of the show. However, due to the COVID-19 pandemic, the contest was cancelled.

Prior to the Eurovision Song Celebration YouTube broadcast in place of the semi-finals, it was revealed that Denmark was set to perform in position 11, following the entry from Switzerland and before the entry from Albania.
