= Denmark in the Eurovision Song Contest 2019 =

- Eurovision Song Contest 2019
- Country: Denmark
- Selection process: Dansk Melodi Grand Prix 2019
- Selection date: 23 February 2019

Competing entry
- Song: "Love Is Forever"
- Artist: Leonora
- Songwriters: Lise Cabble; Melanie Wehbe; Emil Lei

Placement
- Semi-final result: Qualified (10th, 94 points)
- Final result: 12th, 120 points

Participation chronology

Denmark was represented at the Eurovision Song Contest 2019 with the song "Love Is Forever" written by Lise Cabble, Melanie Wehbe and Emil Lei. The song was performed by Leonora. The Danish broadcaster DR organised the national final Dansk Melodi Grand Prix 2019 in order to select the Danish entry for the 2019 contest in Tel Aviv, Israel. Ten songs competed in a televised show where "Love Is Forever" performed by Leonora was the winner as decided upon through the combination of jury voting and public voting over two rounds.

Denmark was drawn to compete in the second semi-final of the Eurovision Song Contest which took place on 16 May 2019. Performing during the show in position 7, "Love Is Forever" was announced among the top 10 entries of the second semi-final and therefore qualified to compete in the final on 18 May. It was later revealed that Denmark placed tenth out of the 18 participating countries in the semi-final with 94 points. In the final, Denmark performed in position 6 and placed twelfth out of the 26 participating countries, scoring 120 points.

== Background ==
Prior to the 2019 contest, Denmark had participated in the Eurovision Song Contest forty-seven times since their first entry in 1957. Denmark had won the contest, to this point, on three occasions: in 1963 with the song "Dansevise" performed by Grethe and Jørgen Ingmann, and twice in Sweden: in 2000 with the song "Fly on the Wings of Love" performed by Olsen Brothers, and again in 2013 with the song "Only Teardrops" performed by Emmelie de Forest. In the 2018 contest, "Higher Ground" performed by Rasmussen qualified Denmark to the final placing ninth.

The Danish national broadcaster, DR, broadcasts the event within Denmark and organises the selection process for the nation's entry. DR confirmed their intentions to participate at the 2019 Eurovision Song Contest on 10 August 2018. Denmark has selected all of their Eurovision entries thus far through the national final Dansk Melodi Grand Prix. On 22 August 2018, the broadcaster announced that Dansk Melodi Grand Prix 2019 would be organised in order to select Denmark's entry for the 2019 contest.

== Before Eurovision ==
=== Dansk Melodi Grand Prix 2019 ===
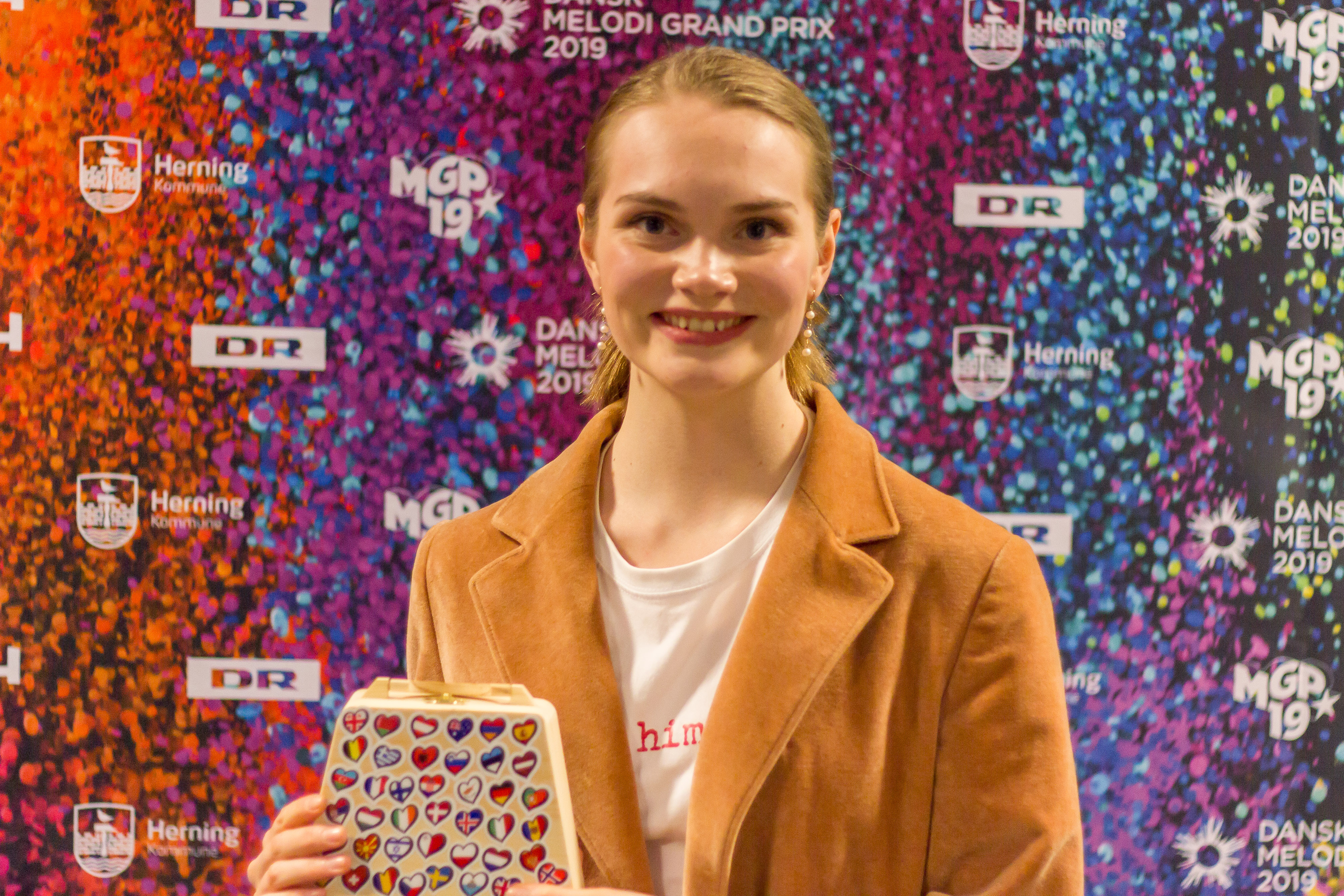
Leonora backstage during Dansk Melodi Grand Prix 2019

Dansk Melodi Grand Prix 2019 was the 49th edition of Dansk Melodi Grand Prix, the music competition that selects Denmark's entries for the Eurovision Song Contest. The event was held on 23 February 2019 at the Jyske Bank Boxen in Herning, hosted by Johannes Nymark and Kristian Gintberg and televised on DR1 as well as streamed online at DR TV. The show was also televised in Greenland on KNR1 as well as streamed online at KNR TV. The national final was watched by 1.324 million viewers in Denmark.

==== Format ====
Ten songs competed in one show where the winner was determined over two rounds of voting. In the first round, the top three songs based on the combination of votes from a public vote and a ten-member jury panel qualified to the superfinal. In the superfinal, the winner was determined by the public and jury vote. Viewers in Denmark and Greenland were able to vote via SMS or a mobile application specifically designed for the competition. Viewers using the app to cast a vote were provided with one free vote. The ten-member jury panel was composed of ten Danish Eurovision fans: Peter Bach, Clara Amalie Singerholm Christiansen, Benjamin Holstebroe, Jonas Jacobsen, Christina Janus, Kristina Møller Karlsen, Annette Kjungberg Kjeldsen, Mila Kovalj, Jonas Leth-Jensen and Ole Tøpholm.

==== Competing entries ====
DR opened a submission period on 22 August 2018 for artists and composers to submit their entries. Entries could be submitted throughout the year, however only songs submitted by 26 September 2018 were considered for the 2019 edition of the competition. The entertainment director for DR, Jan Lagermand Lundme, stated that the competition would seek out "high quality songs that have a strong chorus" with emphasis on songs that stand out to viewers. The broadcaster received 800 entries during the submission period. 30 songs were shortlisted from the entries submitted to the broadcaster and a selection committee of OGAE Denmark members, Eurovision viewers and industry professionals selected ten songs. DR held a press meet and greet at the Koncerthuset in Copenhagen on 31 January 2019 where the competing artists and songs were announced and officially presented. Notably, for the first time since 1979 the Greenlandic language was heard in DMGP; Julie and Nina's song League of Light was sung in both English and Greenlandic.

Artist	Song	Songwriter(s)
Humørekspressen	"Dronning af baren"	Christian Kroman, Søren Schou, Chapper, Peter Lützen
Jasmin Gabay	"Kiss Like This"	Lise Cabble, Clara Sofie Fabricius, Fredrik Sonefors
Julie and Nina	"League of Light"	Julie Berthelsen, Nina Kreutzmann Jørgensen, Marcus Winther-John, Joachim Ersgaard
Leeloo	"That Vibe"	Laurell Barker, Ludvig Hilarius Brygmann, Maria Marcus
Leonora	"Love Is Forever"	Lise Cabble, Melanie Wehbe, Emil Lei
Marie Isabell	"Dancing with You in My Heart"	Greg C. Curtis, Miguel Garcia, Petrus Wessman, John Ballard
Rasmus Faartoft	"Hold My Breath"	Martin Skriver, Tim Schou, Thomas Agerholm, Sebastian Owens, Benjamin Rønn, Marcus Elkjer
Sigmund Trondheim	"Say My Name"	Christoffer Stjerne, Abigail F. Jones
Simone Emilie	"Anywhere"	Jeanette Bonde, Fred Miller, Fredrik Sonefors
Teit Samsø	"Step It Up"	Christoffer Stjerne, Lise Cabble, Nanna Larsen

==== Final ====
The final took place on 23 February 2019. In the first round of voting the top three advanced to a superfinal based on the votes of a ten-member jury (50%) and a public vote (50%). In the superfinal, the winner, "Love Is Forever" performed by Leonora, was selected by the public and jury vote. In addition to the performances of the competing entries, Stig Rossen, Danish Eurovision 2010 entrant Chanée and N'evergreen and Danish Eurovision 2018 entrant Rasmussen performed as the interval acts.

Final – 23 February 2019
R/O	Artist	Song	Result
1	Simone Emilie	"Anywhere"	—N/a
2	Jasmin Gabay	"Kiss Like This"	—N/a
3	Rasmus Faartoft	"Hold My Breath"	—N/a
4	Marie Isabell	"Dancing with You in My Heart"	—N/a
5	Sigmund Trondheim	"Say My Name"	Advanced
6	Humørekspressen	"Dronning af baren"	—N/a
7	Julie and Nina	"League of Light"	Advanced
8	Teit Samsø	"Step It Up"	—N/a
9	Leonora	"Love Is Forever"	Advanced
10	Leeloo	"That Vibe"	—N/a

Superfinal – 23 February 2019
R/O	Artist	Song	Jury	Televote	Total	Place
1	Sigmund Trondheim	"Say My Name"	14%	9%	23%	3
2	Julie and Nina	"League of Light"	12%	23%	35%	2
3	Leonora	"Love Is Forever"	24%	18%	42%	1

=== Promotion ===
Leonora made several appearances across Europe to specifically promote "Love Is Forever" as the Danish Eurovision entry. On 6 April, Leonora performed during the Eurovision in Concert event which was held at the AFAS Live venue in Amsterdam, Netherlands and hosted by Cornald Maas and Marlayne. On 14 April, Leonora performed during the London Eurovision Party, which was held at the Café de Paris venue in London, United Kingdom and hosted by Nicki French and Paddy O'Connell. On 21 April, Leonora performed during the Eurovision Pre-Party Madrid event, which was held at the Sala La Riviera venue in Madrid, Spain and hosted by Tony Aguilar and Julia Varela. On 24 April, Leonora performing during the Eurovision Pre-Party, which was held at the Vegas City Hall in Moscow, Russia and hosted by Alexey Lebedev and Andres Safari.

== At Eurovision ==
According to Eurovision rules, all nations with the exceptions of the host country and the "Big Five" (France, Germany, Italy, Spain and the United Kingdom) are required to qualify from one of two semi-finals in order to compete for the final; the top ten countries from each semi-final progress to the final. The European Broadcasting Union (EBU) split up the competing countries into six different pots based on voting patterns from previous contests, with countries with favourable voting histories put into the same pot. On 28 January 2019, a special allocation draw was held which placed each country into one of the two semi-finals, as well as which half of the show they would perform in. Denmark was placed into the second semi-final, to be held on 16 May 2019, and was scheduled to perform in the first half of the show.

Once all the competing songs for the 2019 contest had been released, the running order for the semi-finals was decided by the shows' producers rather than through another draw, so that similar songs were not placed next to each other. Denmark was set to perform in position 7, following the entry from Romania and before the entry from Sweden.

The two semi-finals and final were broadcast on DR1 with commentary by Ole Tøpholm. The Danish spokesperson, who announced the top 12-point score awarded by the Danish jury during the final, was 2018 Danish Eurovision entrant Rasmussen.

=== Semi-final ===
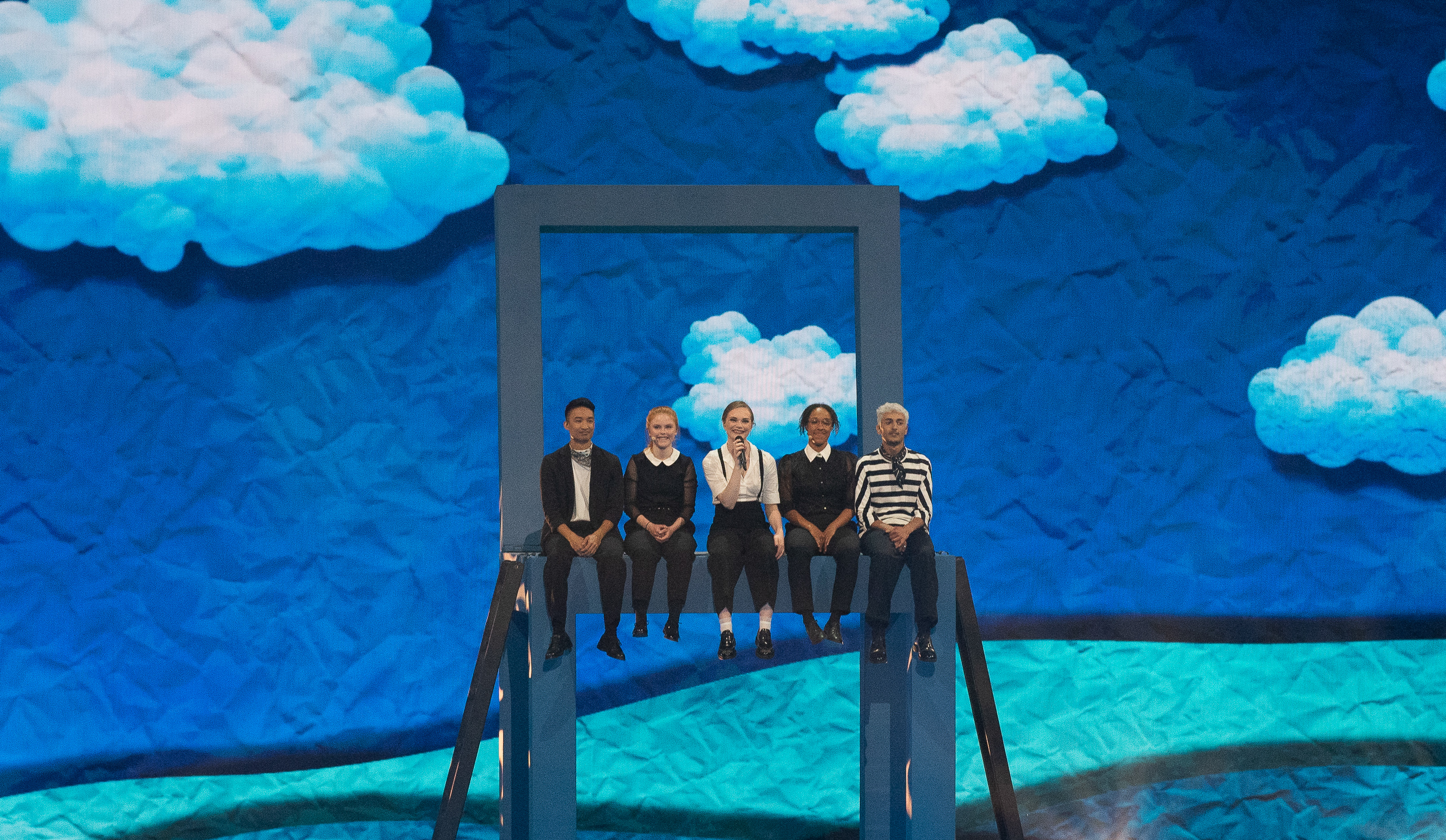
Leonora during a rehearsal before the second semi-final

Leonora took part in technical rehearsals on 6 and 10 May, followed by dress rehearsals on 15 and 16 May. This included the jury show on 15 May where the professional juries of each country watched and voted on the competing entries.

The Danish performance featured Leonora dressed in a white blouse and black trousers and performing with two dancers and two backing vocalists. The performance began with Leonora behind two screens that displayed a blue sky summer background and later pulled away to reveal the audience. During the second verse, Leonora climbed a ladder onto a big chair to join the backing vocalists. The dancers finished the performance by carrying ladders to climb towards the chair and sit upon with the other performers. The LED screens displayed an animated country scene with blue sky and clouds as well as a rising sun with rays of light flowing out. The two dancers that joined Leonora were Ryan Jacolbe and Sinan Spahi, while the two backing vocalists were: Andrea Heick Gadeberg and Sofie Niebuhr McQueen. An additional off-stage backing vocalist was also featured: Jeanette Bonde.

At the end of the show, Denmark was announced as having finished in the top 10 and subsequently qualifying for the grand final. It was later revealed that Denmark placed tenth in the semi-final, receiving a total of 94 points: 41 points from the televoting and 53 points from the juries.

=== Final ===
Shortly after the second semi-final, a winner's press conference was held for the ten qualifying countries. As part of this press conference, the qualifying artists took part in a draw to determine which half of the grand final they would subsequently participate in. This draw was done in the order the countries were announced during the semi-final. Denmark was drawn to compete in the first half. Following this draw, the shows' producers decided upon the running order of the final, as they had done for the semi-finals. Denmark was subsequently placed to perform in position 6, following the entry from Russia and before the entry from San Marino.

Leonora once again took part in dress rehearsals on 17 and 18 May before the final, including the jury final where the professional juries cast their final votes before the live show. Leonora performed a repeat of her semi-final performance during the final on 18 May. Denmark placed twelfth in the final, scoring 120 points: 51 points from the televoting and 69 points from the juries.

=== Voting ===
Voting during the three shows involved each country awarding two sets of points from 1-8, 10 and 12: one from their professional jury and the other from televoting. Each nation's jury consisted of five music industry professionals who are citizens of the country they represent, with their names published before the contest to ensure transparency. This jury judged each entry based on: vocal capacity; the stage performance; the song's composition and originality; and the overall impression by the act. In addition, no member of a national jury was permitted to be related in any way to any of the competing acts in such a way that they cannot vote impartially and independently. The individual rankings of each jury member as well as the nation's televoting results were released shortly after the grand final.

Below is a breakdown of points awarded to Denmark and awarded by Denmark in the second semi-final and grand final of the contest, and the breakdown of the jury voting and televoting conducted during the two shows:

==== Points awarded to Denmark ====
Points awarded to Denmark (Semi-final 2)
Score	Televote	Jury
12 points		Italy
10 points	Sweden	
8 points	Norway	
7 points		Latvia
6 points		United Kingdom
5 points	Latvia	Germany; Norway
4 points	Netherlands	Austria
3 points	Lithuania	Ireland; Netherlands; Russia
2 points	Austria; Ireland; Malta; Switzerland	Sweden; Switzerland
1 point	Albania; Armenia; Croatia	Moldova

Points awarded to Denmark (Final)
Score	Televote	Jury
12 points		Italy
10 points		
8 points		
7 points	Sweden	Georgia; Latvia; Netherlands
6 points	Estonia; United Kingdom	Hungary
5 points	Netherlands; Norway	Poland
4 points	France; Germany; Iceland; Italy	Moldova; Norway; Slovenia
3 points	Slovenia	Montenegro; United Kingdom
2 points		Estonia; Serbia
1 point	Israel; Portugal; Switzerland	Belgium; France; Germany

==== Points awarded by Denmark ====
Points awarded by Denmark (Semi-final 2)
Score	Televote	Jury
12 points	Norway	Sweden
10 points	Sweden	North Macedonia
8 points	Netherlands	Norway
7 points	Azerbaijan	Netherlands
6 points	Switzerland	Latvia
5 points	Malta	Croatia
4 points	Lithuania	Switzerland
3 points	Russia	Russia
2 points	Moldova	Austria
1 point	North Macedonia	Azerbaijan

Points awarded by Denmark (Final)
Score	Televote	Jury
12 points	Norway	Sweden
10 points	Sweden	North Macedonia
8 points	Estonia	Germany
7 points	Netherlands	Netherlands
6 points	Switzerland	Switzerland
5 points	Azerbaijan	Norway
4 points	Iceland	Azerbaijan
3 points	Italy	Russia
2 points	Australia	Estonia
1 point	Spain	Italy

==== Detailed voting results ====
The following members comprised the Danish jury:

- Henrik Milling (jury chairperson) – radio host, DJ, music expert
- Anders Bisgaard – radio host
- Katinka Buchwald Bjerregaard – singer and songwriter
- Julie Berthelsen – singer
- Johnny Reimar – singer and songwriter

Detailed voting results from Denmark (Semi-final 2)
R/O	Country	Jury							Televote	
R/O	Country	H. Milling	A. Bisgaard	K. Bjerregaard	J. Berthelsen	J. Reimar	Rank	Points	Rank	Points
01	Armenia	5	10	10	13	17	14		15	
02	Ireland	17	7	17	6	10	13		16	
03	Moldova	10	11	12	15	14	15		9	2
04	Switzerland	9	2	14	4	9	7	4	5	6
05	Latvia	2	4	5	10	8	5	6	12	
06	Romania	12	16	7	17	16	16		13	
07	Denmark									
08	Sweden	1	1	9	1	4	1	12	2	10
09	Austria	15	9	4	9	7	9	2	17	
10	Croatia	11	15	8	3	2	6	5	11	
11	Malta	14	5	16	11	6	11		6	5
12	Lithuania	13	12	3	16	11	12		7	4
13	Russia	7	14	13	5	5	8	3	8	3
14	Albania	16	17	11	14	13	17		14	
15	Norway	4	3	15	7	1	3	8	1	12
16	Netherlands	8	8	2	2	12	4	7	3	8
17	North Macedonia	3	13	1	8	3	2	10	10	1
18	Azerbaijan	6	6	6	12	15	10	1	4	7

Detailed voting results from Denmark (Final)
R/O	Country	Jury							Televote	
R/O	Country	H. Milling	A. Bisgaard	K. Bjerregaard	J. Berthelsen	J. Reimar	Rank	Points	Rank	Points
01	Malta	24	10	22	13	15	16		12	
02	Albania	25	23	11	14	21	21		22	
03	Czech Republic	4	5	9	18	16	11		11	
04	Germany	9	11	7	3	2	3	8	17	
05	Russia	11	6	18	2	7	8	3	13	
06	Denmark									
07	San Marino	7	13	23	24	8	14		20	
08	North Macedonia	3	9	3	7	4	2	10	18	
09	Sweden	1	1	12	1	3	1	12	2	10
10	Slovenia	17	24	2	22	23	13		16	
11	Cyprus	12	19	17	23	22	23		21	
12	Netherlands	14	2	4	5	9	4	7	4	7
13	Greece	23	25	25	25	24	25		25	
14	Israel	21	21	14	16	10	17		23	
15	Norway	5	7	19	11	1	6	5	1	12
16	United Kingdom	10	12	16	10	5	12		15	
17	Iceland	19	20	8	21	25	18		7	4
18	Estonia	2	8	10	8	11	9	2	3	8
19	Belarus	20	18	20	20	20	24		19	
20	Azerbaijan	13	3	5	6	12	7	4	6	5
21	France	22	15	6	17	17	15		14	
22	Italy	8	16	1	9	18	10	1	8	3
23	Serbia	16	22	15	12	19	19		24	
24	Switzerland	6	4	13	4	6	5	6	5	6
25	Australia	18	17	21	15	13	22		9	2
26	Spain	15	14	24	19	14	20		10	1
