= Gavyn =

Gavyn is a masculine given name and a variant spelling of Gavin. Notable people with the name include:

- Gavyn Arthur (1951–2016), British judge and Lord Mayor of London
- Gavyn Bailey (born 1998), American singer-songwriter and producer
- Gavyn Davies (born 1950), British businessman
- Gavyn Wright, British violinist and orchestra leader

Fictional characters

- Prince Gavyn, superhero from DC Comics
- Gavyn Sykes, character from the Star Wars franchise
