= Leonora (singer) =

Danish singer and figure skater

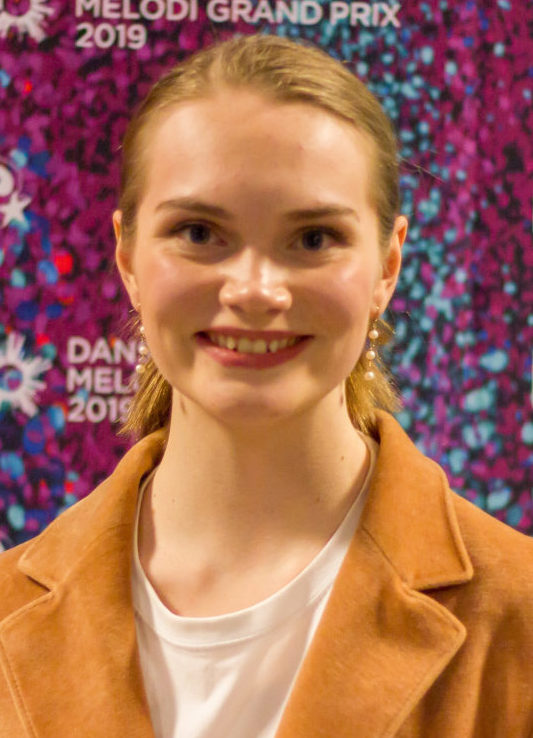
- Leonora in 2019

Background information
- Born: Leonora Colmor Jepsen; 3 October 1998 (age 27); Hellerup, Denmark
- Occupations: Musician, singer
- Instrument: Vocals
- Years active: 2018–present

Leonora Colmor Jepsen (born 3 October 1998), also known simply as Leonora, is a Danish singer and former competitive figure skater. As a figure skater, she was a two-time national junior champion in singles in 2015, 2016 and represented her country at the 2016 World Junior Championships. As a singer, she won the 2019 Dansk Melodi Grand Prix and represented Denmark at that year's Eurovision Song Contest in Tel Aviv, finishing 12th with 120 points.

== Early life ==
Born and raised in Hellerup to the north of Copenhagen where she still lives, Leonora received her high school diploma from Gammel Hellerup Gymnasium. She has written many songs of her own, performing in cafés, libraries and small school concerts.

== Career ==
As a figure skater, she competed in the ISU World Junior Championships in 2016 and in the ISU JGP Riga Cup 2015. In December 2016, Leonora and her brother Linus were gold medallists at the Danish figure-skating championships. She had previously been Denmark's junior champion skating solo. She now no longer competes but works as a figure-skating trainer and choreographer.

She represented her country in the Eurovision Song Contest 2019 in Tel Aviv with the song "Love Is Forever". She won Danish Melodi Grand Prix 2019 after gaining 42% of the public and jury vote in the superfinal, beating favorites Julie & Nina, and Sigmund. Her song "Love Is Forever", written by Lise Cabble, Melanie Wehbe and Emil Lei, combines four different languages: English, Danish, German and French.

== Competitive highlights ==
JGP: Junior Grand Prix

Event	14–15	15–16
International: Junior
Junior Worlds		42nd
JGP Latvia		23rd J
NRW Trophy		20th J
Ice Challenge	19th J	
Nordics	7th J	12th J
Coupe du Printemps	6th J	
National: Junior
Danish Champ.	1st J	1st J
Levels: J = Junior

== Discography ==
=== Singles ===
Title	Year	Peak chart positions				Album
Title	Year	DEN	SCO	SWE Heat.	UK Down.	Album
"Love Is Forever"	2019	16	77	12	61	Non-album singles
"Turquoise"	2020	—	—	—	—	Non-album singles
"—" denotes a recording that did not chart or was not released in that territory.

Awards and achievements
Preceded by Rasmussen with "Higher Ground"	Denmark in the Eurovision Song Contest; 2019	Succeeded by Ben and Tan with "Yes"
