= Hatting, Denmark =

Hatting
- Town
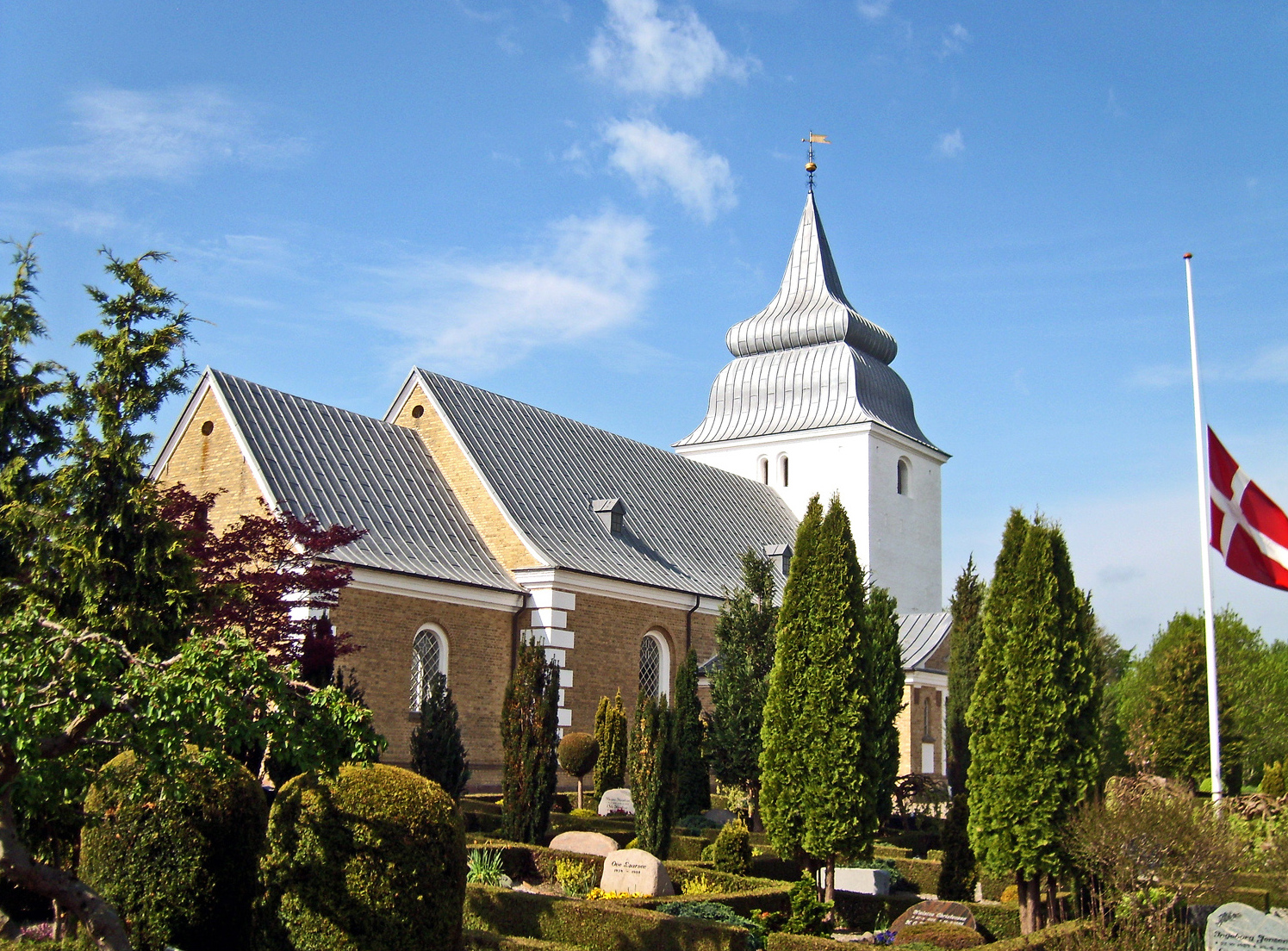
- Hatting Church

- Location in Denmark Hatting (Central Denmark Region)
- Coordinates: 55.85403°N 9.76533°E
- Country: Denmark
- Region: Region Midtjylland
- Municipality: Horsens Municipality

Area
  - Urban: 1.5 km^{2} (0.58 sq mi)

Population (2026)
  - Urban: 2,132
  - Urban density: 1,400/km^{2} (3,700/sq mi)
- Time zone: UTC+1 (CET)
  - Summer (DST): UTC+2 (CEST)
- Postal code: DK-8700 Horsens

Hatting is a town in Horsens Municipality, Denmark, with a population of 2,132 (1 January 2026).

== Notable people ==
- Bodil Kjær (born 1932 in Hatting) a Danish architect, furniture designer, professor and researcher, who has specialized in interior design and city planning
- Kristian Kjærlund (born 1966 in Hatting) a Danish singer, won X Factor (Danish season 12)
