= Mathilde Caffey =

Danish-American singer

- Born: Mathilde Elisabeth Caffey; 7 October 2004 (age 21); Aalestrup, Denmark
- Origin: Aalestrup, Denmark
- Genres: Pop
- Occupation: Singer
- Instrument: Vocals
- Years active: 2020–present

Mathilde Caffey is a Danish-American singer. She became the runner-up of the thirteenth season of the Danish version of the X Factor behind the winner Alma Agger.

== Performances during X Factor ==
Episode	Theme	Song	Artist	Result
Audition	Free choice	"Crazy"	Gnarls Barkley	Through to 5 Chair Challenge
5 Chair Challenge	Free choice	"Zombie"	The Cranberries	Through to bootcamp
Bootcamp	Free choice	"Learning to Live"	Beth Hart	Through to live shows
Live show 1	Signature	"Boring People"	L Devine	Bottom two (9th)
Live show 1	Save me song	"A Change Is Gonna Come"	Sam Cooke	Saved
Live show 2	Songs from the 1980s	"Sweet Dreams Seven Nation Army Mashup"	Pomplamoose Featuring Sarah Dugas	Safe (1st)
Live show 3	Songs with a message	"Here"	Alessia Cara	Safe (3rd)
Live show 4 – Semi-final	Songs from musicals	"Right Round"	Flo Rida featuring Kesha	Safe (1st)
Live show 5 – Final (Friday)	Judge's Choice	"Baby"	Bishop Briggs	Safe (2nd)
Live show 5 – Final (Friday)	Duet with a Special Guest	"Ghost"/"Leap of Faith" (with Christopher)	Christopher	Safe (2nd)
Live show 5 – Final (Saturday)	Winner's song	"Karma is a Bitch"	CH10	Runner-up

== Discography ==
=== Singles ===
- "Karma is a Bitch" (2020)
