= Jamie Talbot (singer) =

Danish singer

- Born: 30 September 1988 (age 37); Aalborg, Denmark
- Origin: Aalborg, Denmark
- Genres: Pop,
- Occupation: Singer
- Instrument: Vocals
- Years active: 2018–present

Jamie Talbot (born 30 September 1988) is a Danish singer who was runner-up on the eleventh season of the Danish version of the X Factor behind the winners Place on Earth. He competed in Dansk Melodi Grand Prix 2020 with the song "Bye Bye Heaven" but he did not advance to the final 3.

== Performances during X Factor ==
Episode	Theme	Song	Artist	Result
Audition	Free choice	"Genie"	Jamie Talbot's Father	Through to 5 Chair Challenge
5 Chair Challenge	Free choice	"Sign of the Times"	Harry Styles	Through to bootcamp
Bootcamp	Free choice	"Sanctuary"	Iron Maiden	Through to live shows
Live show 1	My Song	"Famous"	Nathan Sykes	Safe (2nd)
Live show 2	Made in Denmark	"For Evigt"	Volbeat feat. Johan Olsen	Safe (2nd)
Live show 3	Girlpower	"Make Me Feel"	Janelle Monáe	Safe (4th)
Live show 4	Decade 17/18	"Say Something"	Justin Timberlake feat. Chris Stapleton	Safe (2nd)
Live show 5	Something at Heart	"Everybody Knows"	Leonard Cohen	Bottom two (4th)
Live show 5	Save me song	"Let It Be"	The Beatles	Saved
Live show 6 – Semi-final	Songs from their previous performances on X Factor	"Sign of the Times"	Harry Styles	Safe (2nd)
Live show 6 – Semi-final	Duet with a Special Guest	"You Can Close Your Eyes" (with Marie Keis Uhre)	James Taylor	Safe (2nd)
Live show 7 – Final	Judges Choice	"Starlight"	Muse	Safe (2nd)
Live show 7 – Final	Andreas Kryger and Kewan Padré's Choice	"Good Kisser"	Usher	Safe (2nd)
Live show 7 – Final	Winner's single	"Goldmine"	Jamie Talbot	Runner-up

== Discography ==
=== Singles ===
- "Goldmine" (2018)
- "Before We Drown" (2019)
- "Nightmare" (2019)
- "Bye Bye Heaven" (2020)
- "Try Again" (2021)
- "Tear Me a Moon" (2021)
- "Lila" (2021)
- "Has It" (2021)

=== Studio albums ===
- "Has It" (2021)
