= X Factor (Danish TV series) season 11 =

X Factor
- Season 11
- Hosted by: Sofie Linde Ingversen (DR1); Joakim Linde Ingversen (DR1) (from 1st to 2nd live shows), (DR Ultra) (from 3rd live show); Jacob Riising (DR Ultra) (from 1st to 2nd live shows)
- Judges: Thomas Blachman; Sanne Salomonsen; Remee
- Winner: Place on Earth
- Winning mentor: Thomas Blachman
- Runner-up: Jamie Talbot
- Finals venue: DR Byen

Release
- Original network: DR1; DR Ultra (Ultra Factor)
- Original release: January 1 – April 6, 2018

Season chronology
- ← Previous; Season 10 Next → Season 12

X Factor is a Danish television music competition to find new singing talent. Sofie Linde Ingversen returned to host the show for the 3rd time. Thomas Blachman and Remee returned for their respective tenth and eight series as judges and were joined by a new judge Sanne Salomonsen who replaced Mette Lindberg. This season mark the end of X Factor Denmark on DR, followed an announcement made by DR on August 16. On December 21, 2017, TV2 announced the show would be continued the 12th series would be broadcast by them. Place on Earth won the competition and became the 3rd group to win the competition and Thomas Blachman became the winning mentor for the second time.

== Judges and hosts ==
Sofie Linde Lauridsen returned as the host for the 3rd time and Thomas Blachman and Remee also returned, joined by a new Judge Sanne Salomonsen who replaced Mette Lindberg. On February 17 Sofie Linde became a mother after she gave birth to her first child, a daughter, named Trine. Therefore, she cannot be ready for the live shows on February 23 she will be temporarily replaced by her husband Joakim Linde Ingversen until shes ready to return again within the next 7 weeks of live shows.

Season 11 judges

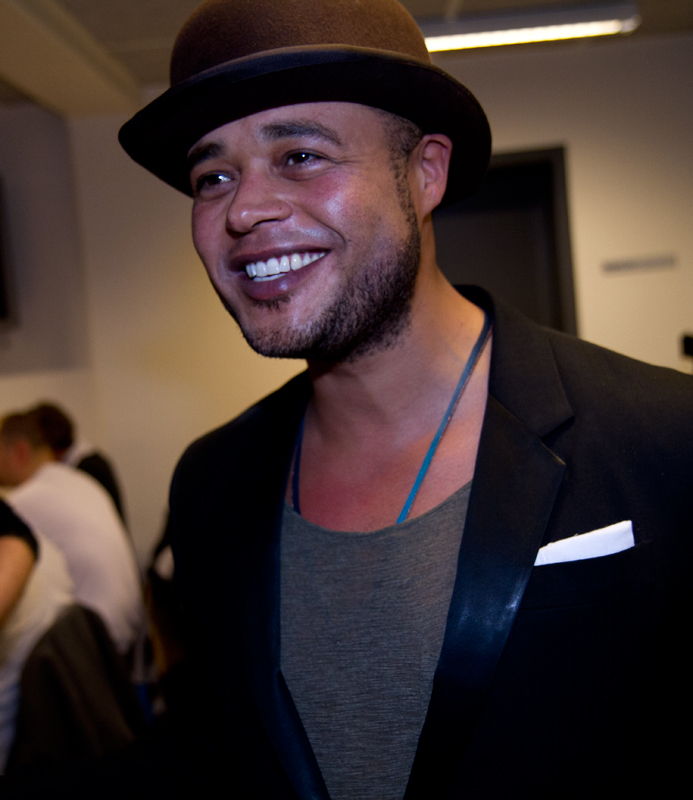
Remee

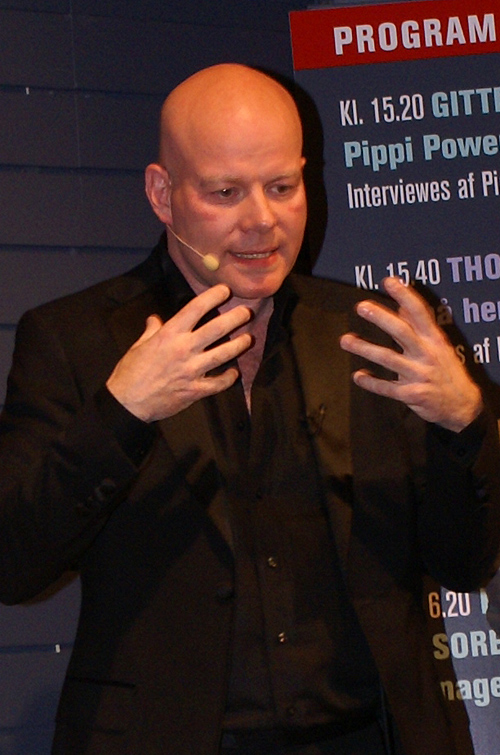
Thomas Blachman

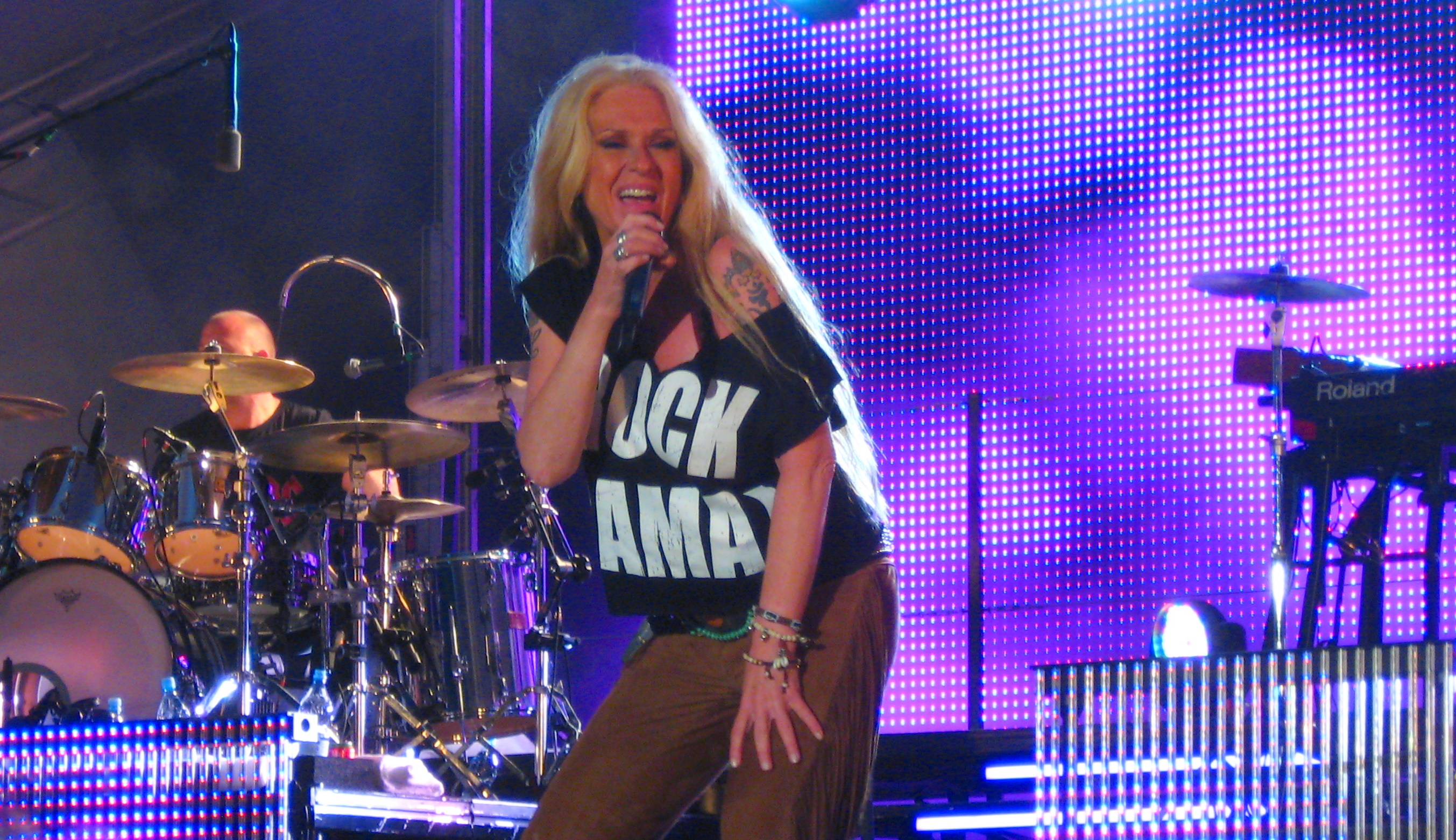
Sanne Salomonsen

== Selection process ==
Auditions took place in Copenhagen and Aarhus.

=== 5 Chair Challenge ===
The 5 Chair Challenge returned for season 11. Sanne Salomonsen mentored the 15-22s, Remee has the Over 23s and Thomas Blachman has the Groups.

The 16 successful acts were:

- 15-22s: Isabella, Marcus, Oliver, Sigmund, Vita
- Over 23s: Anja, Jamie, Laura, Olivur, Rasmus, Vanessa
- Groups: Anne Mette & Tomas, Ivalu & Judithe, Os To, Place on Earth, Sol & Christian

Laura was originally eliminated from the 5 Chair Challenge but Remee later regretted his decision. Therefore, he brought Laura back in the competition and therefore, 16 acts would be competing in Bootcamp.

=== Bootcamp ===
The Bootcamp took place at Schackenborg Slot.

The 7 eliminated acts were:

- 15-22s: Isabella, Marcus
- Over 23s: Laura, Olivur, Vanessa
- Groups: Ivalu & Judithe, Os To

== Contestants ==
Key:

– Winner
– Runner-up

Act	Age(s)	Hometown	Category (mentor)	Result
Place on Earth	17-22	Ølstykke, Herlev & Horsens	Groups (Blachman)	Winner
Jamie Talbot	29	Copenhagen	Over 23s (Remee)	Runner-up
Rasmus Therkildsen	27	Brønshøj	Over 23s (Remee)	3rd place
Sigmund Trondheim	22	Horsens	15-22s (Salomonsen)	4th place
Vita Jensen	17	Døstrup	15-22s (Salomonsen)	5th place
Sol & Christian	15-17	Nykøbing Falster & Hindborg	Groups (Blachman)	6th place
Anne Mette & Tomas	46-51	Testrup	Groups (Blachman)	7th place
Oliver Bendixen	15	Tilst	15-22s (Salomonsen)	8th place
Anja Nynne	27	Copenhagen	Over 23s (Remee)	9th place

== Live shows ==
The live shows started on February 23 at DR Byen.

Colour key

–	Contestant was in the bottom two and had to sing again in the Sing-Off
–	Contestant received the fewest public votes and was immediately eliminated (no Sing-Off)
–	Contestant received the most public votes

Contestants' colour key:

– 15-22s (Salomonsen's contestants)
– Over 23s (Remee's contestants)
– Groups (Blachman's contestants)

Contestant	Week 1	Week 2	Week 3	Week 4	Week 5	Week 6	Week 7	
Contestant	Week 1	Week 2	Week 3	Week 4	Week 5	Week 6	1st round	2nd round
Place on Earth	1st 16,1%	1st 17,5%	1st 18,3%	1st 20,6%	3rd 21,1%	1st 29,2%	1st 41,0%	Winners; 58,3%
Jamie Talbot	2nd 14,3%	2nd 16,8%	4th 16,3%	2nd 19,9%	4th 19,7%	2nd 27.3%	2nd 30,3%	Runner-up; 41,7%
Rasmus Therkildsen	4th 12,1%	3rd 14,1%	3rd 17,0%	4th 16,4%	1st 25,1%	3rd 24,3%	3rd 28,7%	Eliminated (Week 7)
Sigmund Trondheim	5th 11,4%	4th 12,1%	2nd 17,6%	3rd 19,0%	2nd 22,7%	4th 19,1%	Eliminated (Week 6)	
Vita Jensen	6th 9,1%	5th 10,5%	5th 12,3%	6th 7,8%	5th 11,4%	Eliminated (Week 5)		
Sol & Christian	3rd 13,7%	6th 10,1%	6th 11,9%	5th 16,3%	Eliminated (Week 4)			
Anne Mette & Tomas	7th 8,1%	8th 8,2%	7th 6,7%	Eliminated (Week 3)				
Oliver Bendixen	9th 7,2%	7th 8,9%	Eliminated (Week 2)					
Anja Nynne	8th 8,0%	Eliminated (Week 1)						
Sing-Off	Anja Nynne, Oliver Bendixen	Anne Mette & Tomas, Oliver Bendixen	Sol & Christian, Anne Mette & Tomas	Sol & Christian, Vita Jensen	Jamie Talbot, Vita Jensen	The act that received the fewest public votes was automatically eliminated.		
Blachman voted out	Anja Nynne	Oliver Bendixen	Anne Mette & Tomas	Vita Jensen	Vita Jensen	The act that received the fewest public votes was automatically eliminated.		
Salomonsen voted out	Anja Nynne	Anne Mette & Tomas	Sol & Christian	Sol & Christian	Jamie Talbot	The act that received the fewest public votes was automatically eliminated.		
Remee voted out	Oliver Bendixen	Oliver Bendixen	Anne Mette & Tomas	Sol & Christian	Vita Jensen	The act that received the fewest public votes was automatically eliminated.		
Eliminated	Anja Nynne; 9th	Oliver Bendixen; 8th	Anne Mette & Tomas; 7th	Sol & Christian; 6th	Vita Jensen; 5th	Sigmund Trondheim; 4th	Rasmus Therkildsen; 3rd	Jamie Talbot; Runner-Up
Eliminated	Anja Nynne; 9th	Oliver Bendixen; 8th	Anne Mette & Tomas; 7th	Sol & Christian; 6th	Vita Jensen; 5th	Sigmund Trondheim; 4th	Rasmus Therkildsen; 3rd	Place on Earth; Winner

=== Live show details ===
==== Week 1 (February 23) ====
- Theme: My Song

Contestants' performances on the first live show
Act	Order	Song	Result
Rasmus Therkildsen	1	"Misbehaving"	Safe
Vita Jensen	2	"Effortless"	Safe
Anne Mette & Tomas	3	"Technicolour Beat"	Safe
Jamie Talbot	4	"Famous"	Safe
Sigmund Trondheim	5	"Love Runs Out"	Safe
Place on Earth	6	"Slip Away"	Safe (Highest votes)
Anja Nynne	7	"Bust Your Windows"	Bottom two
Sol & Christian	8	"Sommer"	Safe
Oliver Bendixen	9	"Human"	Bottom two
Sing-Off details
Anja Nynne	1	"Walk Away"	Eliminated
Oliver Bendixen	2	"Please Don't Lie"	Saved

Judges' votes to eliminate

- Remee: Oliver Bendixen
- Salomonsen: Anja Nynne
- Blachman: Anja Nynne

==== Week 2 (March 2) ====
- Theme: Made In Denmark
- Musical Guest: Nephew ("Amsterdam")

Contestants' performances on the second live show
Act	Order	Song	Result
Sigmund Trondheim	1	"Dansevise"	Safe
Sol & Christian	2	"Stjerner på Himlen"	Safe
Rasmus Therkildsen	3	"Heroes and Saints"	Safe
Vita Jensen	4	"I Don't Mind"	Safe
Anne Mette & Tomas	5	"Roger"	Bottom two
Oliver Bendixen	6	"Flawless"	Bottom two
Place on Earth	7	"So Mournful the Elegy, So Comforting the Hymn"	Safe (Highest votes)
Jamie Talbot	8	"For Evigt"	Safe
Sing-Off details
Anne Mette & Tomas	1	"Hold Back the River"	Saved
Oliver Bendixen	2	"Lay Me Down"	Eliminated

Judges' votes to eliminate

- Blachman: Oliver Bendixen
- Salomonsen: Anne Mette & Tomas
- Remee: Oliver Bendixen

==== Week 3 (March 9) ====
- Theme: Girlpower

Contestants' performances on the third live show
Act	Order	Song	Result
Place on Earth	1	"Running Up That Hill"	Safe (Highest votes)
Jamie Talbot	2	"Make Me Feel"	Safe
Sol & Christian	3	"Tænkt på et Sted"	Bottom two
Sigmund Trondheim	4	"Cool for the Summer"	Safe
Anne Mette & Tomas	5	"If I Stay"	Bottom two
Rasmus Therkildsen	6	"Godspeed (Sweet Dreams)"	Safe
Vita Jensen	7	"Only Girl (In the World)"	Safe
Sing-Off details
Sol & Christian	1	"Viva Voce"	Saved
Anne Mette & Tomas	2	"The Other Side"	Eliminated

Judges' votes to eliminate

- Salomonsen: Sol & Christian
- Remee: Anne Mette & Tomas
- Blachman: Anne Mette & Tomas

==== Week 4 (March 16) ====
- Theme: Decade 17 & 18 (Songs from year 2017 and 18)

Contestants' performances on the fourth live show
Act	Order	Song	Result
Sol & Christian	1	"Liv Før Døden"	Bottom two
Vita Jensen	2	"I Miss You"	Bottom two
Rasmus Therkildsen	3	"Silence"	Safe
Place on Earth	4	"Say Something Loving'"	Safe (Highest votes)
Sigmund Trondheim	5	"Bad Liar"	Safe
Jamie Talbot	6	"Say Something"	Safe
Sing-Off details
Sol & Christian	1	"The Day After Tomorrow"	Eliminated
Vita Jensen	2	"Wicked Game"	Saved

Judges' votes to eliminate

- Salomonsen: Sol & Christian
- Blachman: Vita Jensen
- Remee: Sol & Christian

==== Week 5 (March 23) ====
- Theme: Something at Heart
- Group Performance: "All You Need Is Love" performed by the top 5

Contestants' performances on the fifth live show
Act	Order	Song	Result
Sigmund Trondheim	1	"Danmark"	Safe
Jamie Talbot	2	"Everybody Knows"	Bottom two
Place on Earth	3	"Pilgrim"	Safe
Vita Jensen	4	"Say Something"	Bottom two
Rasmus Therkildsen	5	"Glory"	Safe (Highest votes)
Sing-Off details
Jamie Talbot	1	"Let It Be"	Saved
Vita Jensen	2	"Read All About It"	Eliminated

Judges' votes to eliminate

- Remee: Vita Jensen
- Salomonsen: Jamie Talbot
- Blachman: Vita Jensen

==== Week 6: Semi-final (March 30) ====
- Theme: Songs from their previous performances on X Factor and duet with a special guest
- Musical Guest: Rak-Su ("Dimelo")

Contestants' performances on the sixth live show
Act	Order	First song	First time Performed	Order	Second song (Duet with a special guest)	Result
Jamie Talbot	1	"Sign of the Times"	5 Chair Challenge	5	"You Can Close Your Eyes" (with UHRE)	Safe
Place on Earth	2	"Nightcall"	Bootcamp	6	"UFO" (with Dorit Chrysler)	Safe (Highest votes)
Rasmus Therkildsen	3	"Jealous"	Audition	7	"Cracked" (with Safri Duo)	Safe
Sigmund Trondheim	4	"Side to Side"	Audition	8	"Malibu" (with Skinz)	Eliminated

The semi-final did not feature a Sing-Off and instead the act with the fewest public votes, Sigmund Trondheim, was automatically eliminated.

After Sigmund Trondheim's elimination, he sang "Alive" by Sia.

==== Week 7: Final (April 6) ====
- Theme: Judges Choice, Andreas Kryger and Kewan Padré's Choice, Winner's Single
- Musical guest: Thomas Helmig ("Vi er de eneste to") Anne-Marie ("Friends")
- Group Performances: ("Don't Stop Me Now" performed by X Factor 2018 Contestants and X Factor All Stars) ("Det Mig Der Står Herude og Banker"/"Den Jeg Elsker" performed by X Factor 2018 auditionees)

Contestants' performances on the seventh live show
Act	Order	Judges Choice Song	Order	Andreas Kryger & Kewan Padré's Choice Song	Order	Winner's single	Result
Rasmus Therkildsen	1	"Freedom"	4	"Pillowtalk"	N/A	N/A (Already eliminated)	3rd Place
Place on Earth	2	"Wake Up"	5	"Electric Feel"	8	"Young"	Winner
Jamie Talbot	3	"Starlight"	6	"Good Kisser"	7	"Goldmine"	Runner-up
