= Young (Place on Earth song) =

Single by Place on Earth
- Released: 30 March 2018
- Genre: Pop, soul
- Length: 3:35
- Label: Sony Music Denmark
- Songwriters: Kwamie Liv; Nicolai Kornerup

"Young" is the debut single of the Danish trio Place on Earth, winners of the eleventh season of the Danish version of X Factor. The English language song was their winner's song for the finale of the show on 6 April 2018.

== Charts ==
Chart (2018)	Peak position
Denmark (Tracklisten)	26
