= Rasmus Therkildsen =

- Born: 1990/1991; Brønshøj, Denmark
- Origin: Brønshøj, Denmark
- Genres: Pop
- Occupation: Singer
- Instrument: Vocals
- Years active: 2018–present

Rasmus Therkildsen (born 1990 or 1991), is a Danish singer where he came in third place of the eleventh season of the Danish version of the X Factor.

== Performances during X Factor ==
Episode	Theme	Song	Artist	Result
Audition	Free choice	"Jealous"	Labrinth	Through to 5 Chair Challenge
5 Chair Challenge	Free choice	"Happier"	Ed Sheeran	Through to bootcamp
Bootcamp	Free choice	"Back from the Edge"	Bruce Dickinson	Through to live shows
Live show 1	My Song	"Misbehaving"	Labrinth	Safe (4th)
Live show 2	Made in Denmark	"Heroes and Saints"	Nikolaj Grandjean	Safe (3rd)
Live show 3	Girlpower	"Godspeed (Sweet Dreams)"	Dixie Chicks	Safe (3rd)
Live show 4	Decade 17/18	"Silence"	Marshmello feat. Khalid	Safe (4th)
Live show 5	Something at Heart	"Glory"	Common and John Legend	Safe (1st)
Live show 6 – Semi-final	Songs from their previous performances on X Factor	"Jealous"	Labrinth	Safe (3rd)
Live show 6 – Semi-final	Duet with a Special Guest	"Cracked" (with Safri Duo)	Pentatonix	Safe (3rd)
Live show 7 – Final	Judges Choice	"Freedom"	Beyoncé feat. Kendrick Lamar	3rd Place
Live show 7 – Final	Andreas Kryger and Kewan Padré's Choice	"Pillowtalk"	Zayn	3rd Place

== Discography ==
=== Singles ===
- "Rescue" (2018)
