= X Factor (Danish TV series) season 13 =

X Factor
- Season 13
- Hosted by: Sofie Linde Ingversen
- Judges: Thomas Blachman; Oh Land; Ankerstjerne
- Winner: Alma Agger
- Winning mentor: Thomas Blachman
- Runner-up: Mathilde Caffey
- Finals venue: X Factor studios in Brøndby

Release
- Original network: TV2
- Original release: January 1 – May 23, 2020

Season chronology
- ← Previous; Season 12 Next → Season 14

X Factor is a Danish television music competition to find new singing talent. Thomas Blachman, Oh Land and Ankerstjerne returned as the judges and Sofie Linde Ingversen returned as the host for the fifth time.

For the first time in the show's history, the number of live shows were cut, from seven weeks to five weeks. This was in light of the show's suspension owing to precautions over the COVID-19 pandemic.

Act Magnus & Aksel withdrew following this suspension due to the latter's academic commitments on the date of the show's intended return.

Alma Agger became the winner of the show.

For the first time ever on the Danish X Factor all 3 contestants from the same category finished in the top 3.

And also Thomas Blachman became the 2nd judge to win the show with all 3 categories and to win 3 seasons in a row.

== Judges and hosts ==
Thomas Blachman returned for the twelfth time as a judge, with Oh Land and Ankerstjerne returning following their debuts last season. Sofie Linde Ingversen returned as the host for the fifth time.

== Selection process ==
Auditions took place in Copenhagen and Aarhus

The 5 Chair Challenge returns for season 13. Blachman will mentor the 15-22s, Oh Land has the Over 23s and Ankerstjerne has the Groups.

The 15 successful acts were:

- 15-22s: Alma, Emil, Karen Marie, Mathilde, Nichlas
- Over 23s: Elina, Ilona, John, Kali, Nicklas
- Groups: Da-Noize, Kjurious, Magnus & Aksel, Smokey Eyes, Sway

=== Bootcamp ===
The 6 eliminated acts were:

- 15-22s: Karen Marie, Nichlas
- Over 23s: Elina, John
- Groups: Da-Noize, Kjurious

== Contestants ==
Key:

– Winner
– Runner-up
– Withdrew

Act	Age(s)	Hometown	Category (mentor)	Result
Alma Agger	20	Copenhagen	15-22s (Blachman)	Winner
Mathilde Caffey	15	Aalestrup	15-22s (Blachman)	Runner-up
Emil Wismann	21	Sønderborg	15-22s (Blachman)	3rd place
Smokey Eyes	22-23	Various	Groups (Ankerstjerne)	4th place
Ilona Artene	24	Vester Hornum	Over 23s (Oh Land)	5th place
Magnus & Aksel	19	Various	Groups (Ankerstjerne)	6th place
Kaspar "Kali" Andersen	34	Helsingør	Over 23s (Oh Land)	7th place
Sway	15-18	Various	Groups (Ankerstjerne)	8th place
Nicklas Mietke	23	Amager	Over 23s (Oh Land)	9th place

== Live shows ==
Colour key

–	Contestant was in the bottom two and had to sing again in the Sing-Off
–	Contestant received the fewest public votes and was immediately eliminated (no Sing-Off)
–	Contestant received the most public votes
–	Contestant withdrew from the competition

Contestants' colour key:

– 15-22s (Blachman's contestants)
– Over 23s (Oh Land's contestants)
– Groups (Ankerstjerne's contestants)

Contestant	Week 1	Week 2	Week 3	Week 4	Week 5	
Contestant	Week 1	Week 2	Week 3	Week 4	Friday	Saturday
Alma Agger	3rd 15.3%	2nd 16.6%	1st 18.7%	2nd 23.4%	1st 33.3%	Winner; 36.8%
Mathilde Caffey	9th 7.1%	1st 22.5%	3rd 16.9%	1st 25.9%	2nd 29.2%	Runner-up; 34.8%
Emil Wismann	2nd 15.5%	4th 15.0%	5th 13.9%	3rd 18.6%	3rd 23.3%	3rd Place; 28.4%
Smokey Eyes	7th 8.1%	5th 12.9%	4th 16.1%	4th 17.4%	4th 14.2%	Eliminated
Ilona Artene	4th 12.3%	6th 7.4%	7th 8.6%	5th 15.0%	Eliminated (Week 4)	
Magnus & Aksel	1st 17.3%	3rd 16.1%	2nd 17.1%	Withdrew	Withdrew (Week 4)	
Kaspar "Kali" Andersen	5th 8.8%	7th 6.0%	6th 8.7%	Eliminated (Week 3)		
Sway	6th 8.2%	8th 3.5%	Eliminated (Week 2)			
Nicklas Mietke	8th 7.4%	Eliminated (Week 1)				
Sing-Off	Nicklas Mietke, Mathilde Caffey	Kaspar "Kali" Andersen, Sway	Ilona Artene, Kasper "Kali" Andersen	The act that received the fewest public votes was automatically eliminated.		
Blachman voted out	Nicklas Mietke	Sway	Ilona Artene	The act that received the fewest public votes was automatically eliminated.		
Oh Land voted out	Mathilde Caffey	Sway	Kaspar "Kali" Andersen	The act that received the fewest public votes was automatically eliminated.		
Ankerstjerne voted out	Nicklas Mietke	Kaspar "Kali" Andersen	Kaspar "Kali" Andersen	The act that received the fewest public votes was automatically eliminated.		
Eliminated	Nicklas Mietke; 9th	Sway; 8th	Kaspar "Kali" Andersen; 7th	Ilona Artene; 5th	Smokey Eyes; 4th	Emil Wismann; 3rd Mathilde Caffey; Runner-up
Eliminated	Nicklas Mietke; 9th	Sway; 8th	Kaspar "Kali" Andersen; 7th	Magnus & Aksel; 6th	Smokey Eyes; 4th	Alma Agger; Winner

=== Week 1 (February 21) ===
- Theme: Signature

Contestants' performances on the first live show
Act	Order	Song	Result
Nicklas Mietke	1	"Sanctify"	Bottom two
Mathilde Caffey	2	"Boring People"	Bottom two
Magnus & Aksel	3	"Mother"	Safe
Kaspar "Kali" Andersen	4	"Ingen Skam" (Original song)	Safe
Alma Agger	5	"Unforgettable"	Safe
Smokey Eyes	6	"Olympisk"	Safe
Ilona Artene	7	"I Care"	Safe
Emil Wismann	8	"E45"	Safe
Sway	9	"Formation"	Safe
Sing-Off details
Nicklas Mietke	1	"My Prerogative"	Eliminated
Mathilde Caffey	2	"A Change Is Gonna Come"	Safe

Judges' votes to eliminate

- Oh Land: Mathilde Caffey
- Blachman: Nicklas Mietke
- Ankerstjerne: Nicklas Mietke

=== Week 2 (February 28) ===
- Theme: Songs from the 1980s
- Musical Guest: Limahl ("The NeverEnding Story")

Contestants' performances on the second live show
Act	Order	Song	Result
Smokey Eyes	1	"The Look"	Safe
Alma Agger	2	"In the Air Tonight"	Safe
Sway	3	"Ain't Nothin' Goin' On but the Rent"	Bottom two
Kaspar "Kali" Andersen	4	"Kys det nu"	Bottom two
Emil Wismann	5	"Militskvinder"	Safe
Ilona Artene	6	"One Day I'll Fly Away"	Safe
Magnus & Aksel	7	"Kom Tilbage Nu"	Safe
Mathilde Caffey	8	"Sweet Dreams Seven Nation Army Mashup"	Safe
Sing-Off details
Sway	1	"River"/"My Type"	Eliminated
Kaspar "Kali" Andersen	2	"Du Ik Alene" (Original song)	Safe

Judges' votes to eliminate

- Oh Land: Sway
- Ankerstjerne: Kaspar "Kali" Andersen
- Blachman: Sway

=== Week 3 (March 6) ===
- Theme: Songs with a message
- Musical Guest: Scarlet Pleasure ("Better")

Contestants' performances on the third live show
Act	Order	Song	Result
Emil Wismann	1	"Fedterøv"	Safe
Magnus & Aksel	2	"Fashion"	Safe
Ilona Artene	3	"Fighter"	Bottom two
Smokey Eyes	4	"Blowin' in the Wind"	Safe
Mathilde Caffey	5	"Here"	Safe
Kaspar "Kali" Andersen	6	"Til mine dages ende" (Original song)	Bottom two
Alma Agger	7	"Swim Good"	Safe
Sing-Off details
Ilona Artene	1	"One and Only"	Safe
Kaspar "Kali" Andersen	2	"Epiqoneri" (Original song)	Eliminated

Judges' votes to eliminate

- Ankerstjerne: Kaspar "Kali" Andersen
- Blachman: Ilona Artene
- Oh Land: Kaspar "Kali" Andersen

=== Week 4: Semi-Final (May 15) ===
- Theme: Songs from musicals
- Musical Guest: Citybois ("Kærlighed Gør Blind")
- Group Performance: ("Can't Stop the Feeling!")

Contestants' performances on the fourth live show
Act	Order	Song	Film	Result
Alma Agger	1	"Bigger"	The Lion King	Safe
Emil Wismann	2	"Itsi-Bitsi"	Steppeulven	Safe
Ilona Artene	3	"Chim Chim Cher-ee"	Mary Poppins	Eliminated
Smokey Eyes	4	"I Want to Hold Your Hand"	Across the Universe	Safe
Mathilde Caffey	5	"Right Round"	Pitch Perfect	Safe

The semi-final did not feature a sing-off and instead the act with the fewest public votes, Ilona Artene, was automatically eliminated.

After Ilona Artene was eliminated she performed "Scared to Be Lonely" by Martin Garrix and Dua Lipa

Magnus & Aksel withdrew from the competition following the show's suspension due to the latter's academic commitments on the date of the show's intended return.

=== Week 5: Final (May 22/23) ===
- Theme: Judges Choice, Duet with a Special artist

May 22

Contestants' performances on the fifth live show
Act	Order	First song (Judges Choice)	Order	Second song (Duet with a Special Guest)	Result
Mathilde Caffey	1	"Baby"	5	"Ghost"/"Leap of Faith" (With Christopher)	Safe
Smokey Eyes	2	"Only Love Can Hurt Like This"	6	"Verden er i Farver"/"Istedagde" (With Hjalmer)	Eliminated
Emil Wismann	3	"Jyder i København"	8	"Blitz Baby"/"Jeg skal nok vente" (With Jung)	Safe
Alma Agger	4	"Everything I Wanted"	7	"Lonely"/"Nudes" (With Jada)	Safe

- Theme: Winner's song
- Musical guest: Lukas Graham ("Love Songs")
- Group performance: "Hun Kommer Tilbage" (Jung performed by auditionees), "Memories" (Maroon 5 performed by The 9 Contestants)

May 23

Contestants' performances on the final results live show
Act	Order	Winner's song	Result
Alma Agger	1	"The Last Dance"	Winner
Emil Wismann	2	"Selvmord på Dansegulvet"	3rd Place
Mathilde Caffey	3	"Karma is a Bitch"	Runner-up

The Audionees did not performed on stage they performed at home via video because of Coronavirus.

Sofie Linde only announced the winner but after the voting stats for the final came out it was revealed that Mathilde Caffey became the runner-up and Emil Wismann finished in 3rd Place.
