= Sys Bjerre =

Danish singer-songwriter

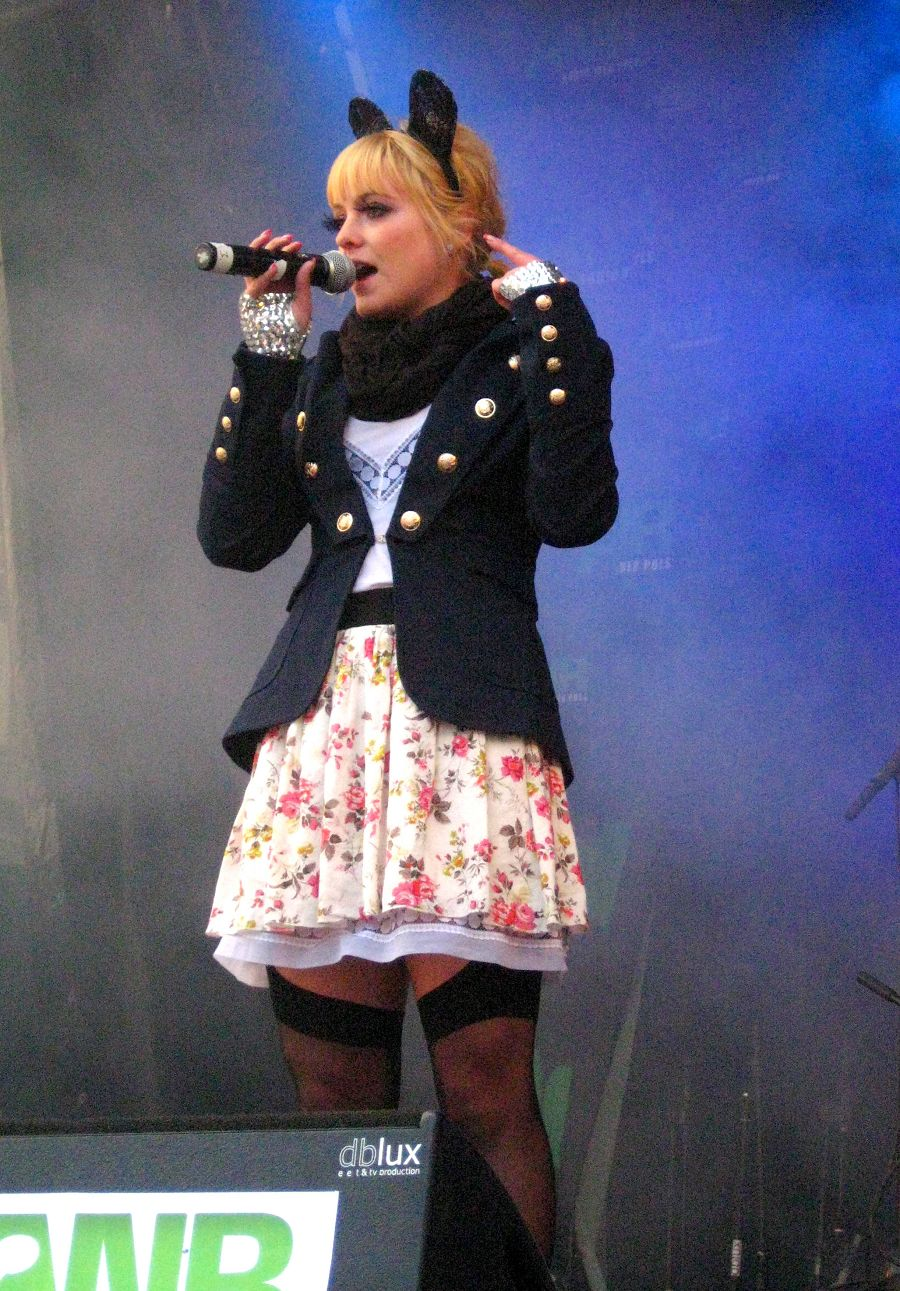
Sys Bjerre in 2010.

Sys Bjerre is a Danish singer-songwriter.

== Career ==
Bjerre broke through in the Danish music scene with the hit "Malene" in the summer of 2008. Previously, she had sung a duet with Thomas Buttenschøn and been on tour with Tue West. On 28 October 2008 it was publicly announced that Danmarks Radio had accepted her as co-host of Boogie together with Jeppe Voldum. Sys Bjerre was invited to the casting.

== Discography ==
=== Albums ===
Year	Album	Peak position	Certification
Year	Album	DAN	Certification
2008	Gør det selv	1	2× Platinum
2010	All In	5	Gold
2012	Sys	6	
2015	Alle Mine Fejl	-	
2021	Lad Os Lave Noget Smukt Før Vi Dør		

=== Singles ===
Year	Single	Peak position	Certification	Album
Year	Single	DAN	Certification	Album
2008	"Malene"	1	3x Platin	Gør det selv
2008	"Kegle"	3	Platinum	Gør det selv
2008	"Det'cember"	22		Non-album single
2009	"Tag dig sammen" (featuring UFO)	—		Non-album single
2010	"Alle mine veninder"	5	Gold	All In
2010	"Kære farmor – Du som er i Herlev"	34		All In
2012	"Sku' ha' gået hjem"	33		Sys
2012	"Hey Vanessa"	—		Sys
2020	"Honestly"	—		Melodi Grand Prix 2020
"—" denotes single that did not chart or was not released.

as featuring artist

Year	Single	Peak position	Certification	Album
Year	Single	DAN	Certification	Album
2011	"Luftkasteller" (Sebastian featuring Sys Bjerre)	–		Øjeblikkets mester
2012	"På vej" (Magtens Korridorer featuring Sys Bjerre)	35		Spil noget vi kender
