= Place on Earth =

Danish musical trio

- Origin: Ølstykke, Horsens, Herlev, Denmark
- Genres: Pop
- Years active: 2018–2019
- Members: Mille Katharina Hassenkam; Kathrine Ørnfelt; Andreas Falch Kruse

Place on Earth is a Danish trio consisting of Mille Katharina Hassenkam, Kathrine Ørnfelt and Andreas Falch Kruse. They became the winners of the eleventh season of the Danish version of the X Factor. They were put together at bootcamp by Thomas Blachman.

== Performances during X Factor ==
Episode	Theme	Song	Artist	Result
Audition	Free choice	N/A	N/A	N/A
5 Chair Challenge	Free choice	N/A	N/A	N/A
Bootcamp	Free choice	"Nightcall"	Kavinsky feat. Lovefoxxx	Through to live shows
Live show 1	My Song	"Slip Away"	Perfume Genius	Safe (1st)
Live show 2	Made in Denmark	"So Mournful the Elegy, So Comforting the Hymn"	Hymns from Nineveh	Safe (1st)
Live show 3	Girlpower	"Running Up That Hill"	Kate Bush	Safe (1st)
Live show 4	Decade 17/18	"Say Something Loving"	The xx	Safe (1st)
Live show 5	Something at Heart	"Pilgrim"	Fink	Safe (3rd)
Live show 6 - Semi-final	Songs from their previous performances on X Factor	"Nightcall"	Kavinsky feat. Lovefoxxx	Safe (1st)
Live show 6 - Semi-final	Duet with a Special Guest	"UFO" (with Dorit Chrysler)	Rue Royale	Safe (1st)
Live show 7 - Final	Judges Choice	"Wake Up"	Arcade Fire	Safe (1st)
Live show 7 - Final	Andreas Kryger and Kewan Padré's Choice	"Electric Feel"	MGMT	Safe (1st)
Live show 7 - Final	Winner's single	"Young"	Place on Earth	Winners

== Discography ==
=== Singles ===
- "Young" (2018)
- "Square" (2018)

=== EPs ===
- Square (2018)

Preceded by Morten Nørgaard	X Factor (Denmark); Winner; 2018	Succeeded by Kristian Kjærlund
