= Kristian Kjærlund =

Danish singer (born 1996)

- Born: 1996; Hatting, Horsens, Denmark
- Origin: Hatting, Horsens, Denmark
- Genres: Pop
- Occupation: Singer
- Instrument: Vocals
- Years active: 2019–present
- Labels: Sony Music

Kristian Kjærlund is a Danish singer who became the winner of the twelfth season of the Danish version of the X Factor.

== Performances during X Factor ==
Episode	Theme	Song	Artist	Result
Audition	Free choice	"Stare Into The Sun"	Graffiti6	Through to 5 Chair Challenge
5 Chair Challenge	Free choice	"Cough Syrup"	Young the Giant	Through to bootcamp
Bootcamp	Free choice	"The Ballad of Mona Lisa"	Panic! at the Disco	Through to live shows
Live show 1	My Song	"Sweet Dreams, TN"	The Last Shadow Puppets	Safe (5th)
Live show 2	Songs from the contestant's birthyears	"Common People"	Pulp	Safe (2nd)
Live show 3	Songs from 2018/2019	"Electrified"	Just Loud	Safe (2nd)
Live show 4	Songs from films	"Blood in the Cut"	K.Flay	Safe (1st)
Live show 5	Nordic songs	"Youth knows no pain"	Lykke Li	Safe
Live show 6 – Semi-final	One Hit Wonders	"You Get What You Give"	New Radicals	Safe (2nd)
Live show 6 – Semi-final	Duet with a Special Guest	"Wish You Were Gay" (with Chili Pedersen)	Billie Eilish	Safe (2nd)
Live show 7 – Final	Judge's Choice	"Do I Wanna Know?"	Arctic Monkeys	Safe (1st)
Live show 7 – Final	Producer's Choice	"Green Light"	Lorde	Safe (1st)
Live show 7 – Final	Winner's single	"Lost and Profound"	Kristian Kjærlund	Winner

== Discography ==
=== Singles ===
- "Lost and Profound" (2019)
- "Where's The Show1" (2019)
- "Anywhere" (2019)

=== EPs ===
Preceded by Place on Earth	X Factor (Denmark) winner 2019	Succeeded by Alma Agger
