= Ben and Tan =

Danish pop duo

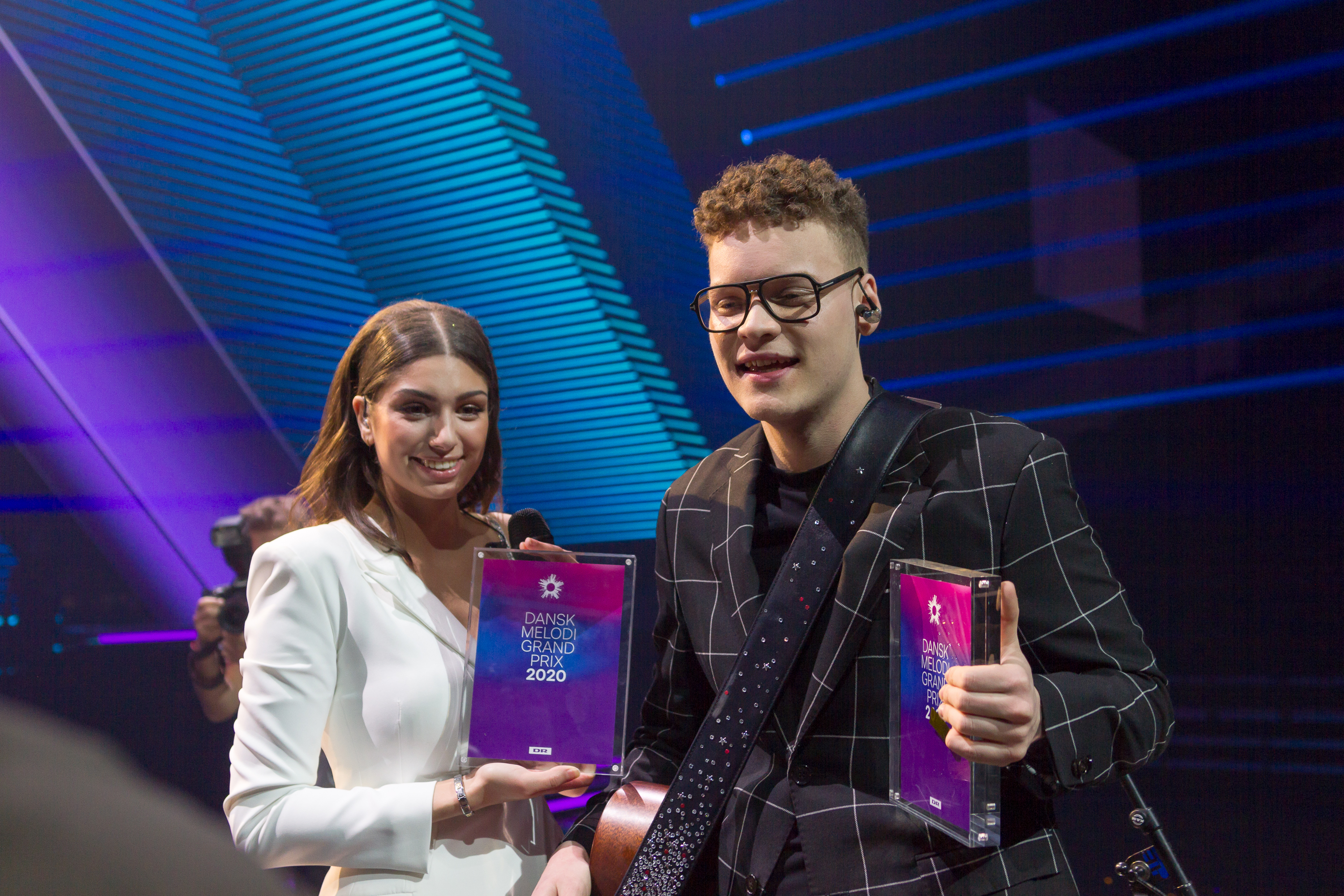
- Ben and Tan at the Dansk Melodi Grand Prix 2020

Background information
- Origin: Denmark
- Genres: Pop
- Years active: 2020–present
- Members: Benjamin Rosenbohm; Tanne Balcells

Ben and Tan are a Danish duo consisting of Benjamin Rosenbohm (born 3 June 2002) and Tanne Balcells (born 15 January 1998). They were due to represent Denmark in the Eurovision Song Contest 2020 in Rotterdam, with the song "Yes", until it was cancelled due to the COVID-19 pandemic.

In 2019, they both participated in the twelfth season of the talent show X Factor and became a duo after the show ended.

== Career ==
=== 2019: X Factor ===
Rosenbohm and Balcells met in 2019 during the twelfth series of X Factor. Rosenbohm entered the competition alone, whereas Balcells competed as a part of girl group Echo. Both were successful in the auditions, 5 Chair Challenge, and Bootcamp, making it through to the live televised shows.

Balcells, as a part of Echo, made it to the semi-final, but was eliminated after the group received the fewest public votes, finishing the competition in fourth place.

Rosenbohm made it to the final where he performed three songs, including what would have been his winner's single, but was not successful and finished runner-up to Kristian Kjærlund.

==== Performances ====
Performed	Song	Original artist	Result
Benjamin Rosenbohm
Audition	"Wait for the Moment"	Vulfpeck	Successful
5 Chair Challenge	"Untitled"	Rex Orange County	Successful
Bootcamp	"Home"	Bruno Major	Successful
Week 1	"When You Love Someone"	James TW	Safe (2nd)
Week 2	"Cry Me a River"	Justin Timberlake	Safe (1st)
Week 3	"Be My Mistake"	The 1975	Safe (1st)
Week 4	"Earned It"	The Weeknd	Safe (2nd)
Week 5	"Crazy Love"	Future Animals	Safe
Semi-final	"A Girl Like You" "Planets"	Edwyn Collins; Nicklas Sahl	Safe (1st)
Final	"Be Alright" "Lost" "Worth a Broken Heart"	Dean Lewis; Frank Ocean; Own song	Runner-up (2nd)
Tanne Balcells (as a part of Echo)
Bootcamp	"Secret Love Song"	Little Mix	Successful
Week 1	"High Five"	Sigrid	Safe (7th)
Week 2	"Clocks"	Coldplay	Safe (6th)
Week 3	"Blur"; Final showdown: "A Thousand Years"	MØ; Christina Perri	Bottom two (7th)
Week 4	"Chiquitita"; Final showdown: "Comfortably Numb"	ABBA; Pink Floyd	Bottom two (6th)
Week 5	"When I Grow Up"	Fever Ray	Safe
Semi-final	"All the Things She Said" "Fjerne slægtninge" After elimination: "Somewhere Only We Know"	t.A.T.u. Bisse; Keane	Eliminated (4th)

=== 2020: Eurovision Song Contest ===
On 7 March 2020, Rosenbohm and Balcells were one of 10 acts that participated in the Dansk Melodi Grand Prix, an annual music competition held in Denmark to determine the country's representative for the Eurovision Song Contest. The pair won with their song "Yes", receiving 61% of the vote, and were therefore due to represent Denmark in the Eurovision Song Contest.

On 18 March 2020, the European Broadcasting Union announced the cancellation of the Eurovision Song Contest 2020 due to the uncertainty surrounding the spread of coronavirus throughout Europe.

=== 2021: Dansk Melodi Grand Prix ===
The duo tried again to represent Denmark in Eurovision trying to participate in the DMGP 2021 submitting their single "Iron Heart" as a proposal, but it was rejected by DR, the song was also rejected by SVT for Melodifestivalen 2021.

== Personal life ==
Rosenbohm was born in Berlin, Germany to a Malagasy father and German mother and moved to Denmark at a young age. Balcells was born in Barcelona, Spain to a Spanish father and Danish mother before moving to Denmark.

== Discography ==
=== Singles ===
Title	Year	Peak chart positions		Certifications
Title	Year	DEN	SWE	Certifications
"Yes"	2020	30	— (Note: "Yes" did not enter the Swedish Singellista Chart, but peaked at number eighteen on the Swedish Heatseeker Chart.)	GLF: Gold
"Summer Nights"	2020	—	—	
"Hallelujah"	2020	—	—	
"Iron Heart"	2021	—	—	
"—" denotes a single that did not chart or was not released.

== Notes ==
Awards and achievements
Preceded by Leonora with "Love Is Forever"	Denmark in the Eurovision Song Contest; 2020 (cancelled)	Succeeded by Fyr & Flamme with "Øve os på hinanden"
