= X Factor (Danish TV series) season 12 =

X Factor
- Season 12
- Hosted by: Sofie Linde Ingversen (TV 2)
- Judges: Thomas Blachman; Oh Land; Ankerstjerne
- Winner: Kristian Kjærlund
- Winning mentor: Thomas Blachman
- Runner-up: Benjamin Rosenbohm
- Finals venue: Forum Horsens

Release
- Original network: TV 2 TV 2 Zulu (Z Factor)
- Original release: January 4 – April 12, 2019

Season chronology
- ← Previous; Season 11 Next → Season 13

X Factor is a Danish television music competition to find new singing talent. This season will be the first season broadcast on TV2. after DR1 announced on August 16, 2017, that Season 11 is the final season broadcast on their channel. Kristian Kjærlund won the competition and Thomas Blachman became the winning mentor for the 3rd time and the 2nd judge to win 2 seasons in a row.

== Judges and hosts ==
Sofie Linde Lauridsen returned as the main host of the show for the 4th time. Thomas Blachman returned as a judge for the 11th time while Remee and Sanne Salomonsen decided to quit. Oh Land and Ankerstjerne replaced them as judges.

== Selection process ==
Auditions took place in Copenhagen, Aarhus and Odense.

=== 5 Chair Challenge ===
The 5 Chair Challenge returns for season 12. Ankerstjerne will mentor the 15-22s, Blachman has the Over 23s and Oh Land has the Groups/Bands.

The 15 successful acts were:

- 15-22s: Albina, Benjamin, Live, Patrick, Rasmus
- Over 23s: Andrea, Emil, Frank, Gina, Kristian
- Groups: Celina, Danjal & Mathias, Dr. Rolf & Kanylerne, Echo, Maria & Bea, Wild Mountains

=== Bootcamp ===
The 6 eliminated acts were:

- 15-22s: Albina, Rasmus
- Over 23s: Emil, Frank
- Groups: Celina, Danjal & Mathias, Wild Mountains

== Contestants ==
Key:

– Winner
– Runner-up
– Withdrew

| Act | Age(s) | Hometown | Category (mentor) | Result |
|---|---|---|---|---|
| Kristian Kjærlund | 23 | Horsens | Over 23s (Blachman) | Winner |
| Benjamin Rosenbohm | 16 | Copenhagen | 15-22s (Ankerstjerne) | Runner-up |
| Live Vogel | 15 | Espergærde | 15-22s (Ankerstjerne) | 3rd place |
| Echo | 15-21 | Various | Groups (Oh Land) | 4th place |
| Maria & Bea | 18 | Haderslev & Sønderborg | Groups (Oh Land) | 5th place |
| Patrick Smith | 18 | Rødby | 15-22s (Ankerstjerne) | 6th place |
| Gina Michaells | 43 | Brande | Over 23s (Blachman) | 7th place |
| Andrea Brøndsted | 29 | Copenhagen | Over 23s (Blachman) | 8th place |
| Dr. Rolf & Kanylerne | 59-70 | Various | Groups (Oh Land) | 9th place |

== Live shows ==
Colour key

| – | Contestant was in the bottom two and had to sing again in the Sing-Off |
| – | Contestant received the fewest public votes and was immediately eliminated (no Sing-Off) |
| – | Contestant received the most public votes |
| – | Contestant withdrew from the competition |

Contestants' colour key:

– 15-22s (Ankerstjerne's contestants)
– Over 23s (Blachman's contestants)
– Groups (Oh Land's contestants)

| Contestant | Week 1 | Week 2 | Week 3 | Week 4 | Week 5 | Week 6 | Week 7 | |
| Contestant | Week 1 | Week 2 | Week 3 | Week 4 | Week 5 | Week 6 | 1st round | 2nd round |
|---|---|---|---|---|---|---|---|---|
| Kristian Kjærlund | 5th 10.8% | 2nd 16.6% | 2nd 17.2% | 1st 24.8% | Safe | 2nd 30.7% | 1st 47.7% | Winner; 54.3% |
| Benjamin Rosenbohm | 2nd 14.3% | 1st 17.2% | 1st 18.1% | 2nd 21.8% | Safe | 1st 34.0% | 2nd 37.8% | Runner-Up; 45.7% |
| Live Vogel | 1st 17.1% | 3rd 15.0% | 4th 13.8% | 4th 14.0% | Safe | 3rd 18.6% | 3rd 14.5% | Eliminated (Week 7) |
| Echo | 7th 10.2% | 6th 11.1% | 7th 11.4% | 6th 11.8% | Safe | 4th 16.6% | Eliminated (Week 6) | |
| Maria & Bea | 3rd 13.9% | 5th 13.0% | 3rd 14.2% | 3rd 15.6% | Withdrew | Withdrew (Week 5) | | |
| Patrick Smith | 8th 6.0% | 7th 7.4% | 5th 13.8% | 5th 12.0% | Eliminated (Week 4) | | | |
| Gina Michaells | 4th 13.0% | 4th 13.6% | 6th 11.4% | Eliminated (Week 3) | | | | |
| Andrea Brøndsted | 6th 10.5% | 8th 6.2% | Eliminated (Week 2) | | | | | |
| Dr. Rolf & Kanylerne | 9th 4.1% | Eliminated (Week 1) | | | | | | |
| Sing-Off | Dr. Rolf & Kanylerne, Patrick Smith | Patrick Smith, Andrea Brøndsted | Gina Michaells, Echo | Patrick Smith, Echo | —N/a | The act that received the fewest public votes was automatically eliminated. | | |
| Ankerstjerne voted out | Dr. Rolf & Kanylerne | Andrea Brøndsted | Gina Michaells | Echo | —N/a | The act that received the fewest public votes was automatically eliminated. | | |
| Oh Land voted out | Patrick Smith | Andrea Brøndsted | Gina Michaells | Patrick Smith | —N/a | The act that received the fewest public votes was automatically eliminated. | | |
| Blachman voted out | Dr. Rolf & Kanylerne | Patrick Smith | Echo | Patrick Smith | —N/a | The act that received the fewest public votes was automatically eliminated. | | |
| Eliminated | Dr. Rolf & Kanylerne; 9th | Andrea Brøndsted; 8th | Gina Michaells; 7th | Patrick Smith; 6th | Maria & Bea; 5th | Echo; 4th | Live Vogel; 3rd | Benjamin Rosenbohm; Runner-Up |
| Eliminated | Dr. Rolf & Kanylerne; 9th | Andrea Brøndsted; 8th | Gina Michaells; 7th | Patrick Smith; 6th | Maria & Bea; 5th | Echo; 4th | Live Vogel; 3rd | Kristian Kjærlund; Winner |

=== Live show details ===
==== Week 1 (March 1) ====
- Theme: My Song

Contestants' performances on the first live show
| Act | Order | Song | Result |
|---|---|---|---|
| Echo | 1 | "High Five" | Safe |
| Kristian Kjærlund | 2 | "Sweet Dreams, TN" | Safe |
| Benjamin Rosenbohm | 3 | "When You Love Someone" | Safe |
| Dr. Rolf & Kanylerne | 4 | "Hvorfor sku' vi synge" (Original song) | Bottom two |
| Gina Michaells | 5 | "Keep Lying" | Safe |
| Patrick Smith | 6 | "Entertaineren" | Bottom two |
| Andrea Brøndsted | 7 | "Poison" | Safe |
| Maria & Bea | 8 | "Bad Girls" | Safe |
| Live Vogel | 9 | "When the Party's Over" | Safe |
Sing-Off details
| Dr. Rolf & Kanylerne | 1 | "Nattens Sang" (Original song) | Eliminated |
| Patrick Smith | 2 | "Det si'r sig selv" | Safe |

Judges' votes to eliminate

- Ankerstjerne: Dr. Rolf & Kanylerne
- Oh Land: Patrick Smith
- Blachman: Dr. Rolf & Kanylerne

==== Week 2 (March 8) ====
- Theme: Songs from the contestant's birthyears

Contestants' performances on the second live show
| Act | Order | Song | Result |
|---|---|---|---|
| Live Vogel | 1 | "White Flag" | Safe |
| Maria & Bea | 2 | "Freestyler" | Safe |
| Patrick Smith | 3 | "De er meget interesserede i"/"Du kan gøre hvad du vil" | Bottom two |
| Andrea Brøndsted | 4 | "Eternal Flame" | Bottom two |
| Benjamin Rosenbohm | 5 | "Cry Me a River" | Safe |
| Gina Michaells | 6 | "I'm Not in Love" | Safe |
| Echo | 7 | "Clocks" | Safe |
| Kristian Kjærlund | 8 | "Common People" | Safe |
Sing-Off details
| Patrick Smith | 1 | "Quang's Sang" | Safe |
| Andrea Brøndsted | 2 | "Don't Know Why" | Eliminated |

Judges' votes to eliminate

- Ankerstjerne: Andrea Brøndsted
- Blachman: Patrick Smith
- Oh Land: Andrea Brøndsted

==== Week 3 (March 15) ====
- Theme: Songs from 2018/2019
- Musical Guest: Hugo Helmig ("Young Like This")

Contestants' performances on the third live show
| Act | Order | Song | Result |
|---|---|---|---|
| Maria & Bea | 1 | "I Like It" | Safe |
| Benjamin Rosenbohm | 2 | "Be My Mistake" | Safe |
| Kristian Kjærlund | 3 | "Electrified" | Safe |
| Live Vogel | 4 | "God Is a Woman" | Safe |
| Echo | 5 | "Blur" | Bottom two |
| Gina Michaells | 6 | "Hope Is a Dangerous Thing for a Woman like Me to Have – but I Have It" | Bottom two |
| Patrick Smith | 7 | "Sort Tulipan" | Safe |
Sing-Off details
| Gina Michaells | 1 | "I Hope You Dance" | Eliminated |
| Echo | 2 | "A Thousand Years" | Safe |

Judges' votes to eliminate

- Oh Land: Gina Michaells
- Blachman: Echo
- Ankerstjerne: Gina Michaells

==== Week 4 (March 22) ====
- Theme: Songs from movies

Contestants' performances on the fourth live show
| Act | Order | Song | Movie | Result |
|---|---|---|---|---|
| Patrick Smith | 1 | "Barndommens Gade" | Barndommens Gade | Bottom two |
| Echo | 2 | "Chiquitita" | Mamma Mia! | Bottom two |
| Kristian Kjærlund | 3 | "Blood in the Cut" | XXX: Return of Xander Cage | Safe |
| Live Vogel | 4 | "Life on Mars?" | The Life Aquatic with Steve Zissou | Safe |
| Maria & Bea | 5 | "Gangsta's Paradise" | Dangerous Minds | Safe |
| Benjamin Rosenbohm | 6 | "Earned It" | Fifty Shades of Grey | Safe |
Sing-Off details
| Patrick Smith | 1 | "Fra mark til by" (Original song) | | Eliminated |
| Echo | 2 | "Comfortably Numb" | | Safe |

Judges' votes to eliminate

- Ankerstjerne: Echo
- Oh Land: Patrick Smith
- Blachman: Patrick Smith

==== Week 5 (March 29) ====
- Theme: Nordic songs
- Musical Guests: Alexander Oscar & SVEA ("Complicated")
- Group Performance: "Off to See the World"

Contestants' performances on the fifth live show
| Act | Order | Song | Result |
|---|---|---|---|
| Benjamin Rosenbohm | 1 | "Crazy Love" | Safe |
| Echo | 2 | "When I Grow Up" | Safe |
| Live Vogel | 3 | "Alle skuffer over tid" | Safe |
| Kristian Kjærlund | 4 | "Youth Knows No Pain" | Safe |
| Maria & Bea | N/A | "Født i dag" | Withdrew |

Maria & Bea withdrew from the competition because of personal reasons, one of them being that Bea's father died, so this week there will be no elimination. However, there will still be a voting but all the publics votes will go through to next week.

==== Week 6: Semi-final (5 April) ====
- Theme: One Hit Wonders & Duet with a Special Guest
- Musical Guests: Emil Kruse & Benjamin Hav ("Air Tonight")

Contestants' performances on the sixth live show
| Act | Order | First song (One Hit Wonders) | Order | Second song (Duet with a Special Guest) | Result |
|---|---|---|---|---|---|
| Kristian Kjærlund | 1 | "You Get What You Give" | 6 | "Wish You Were Gay" (With Chili) | Safe |
| Live Vogel | 2 | "Stand by Me" | 5 | "2000 meter i frit fald" (With Katinka Bjerregaard) | Safe |
| Benjamin Rosenbohm | 3 | "A Girl Like You" | 8 | "Planets" (With Nicklas Sahl) | Safe |
| Echo | 4 | "All the Things She Said" | 7 | "Fjerne slægtninge" (With Bisse) | Eliminated |

The semi-final did not feature a sing-off and instead the act with the fewest public votes, Echo, were automatically eliminated.

This week's publics votes were combined from last weeks votes.

After Echo were eliminated they performed "Somewhere Only We Know" by Keane

==== Week 7: Final (12 April) ====
- Theme: Judge's Choice, Producer's Choice and Winner's single
- Musical guests: Alphabeat ("Shadows") Scarlet Pleasure ("24/7")
- Group Performances: ("Giant" performed by X Factor 2019 Contestants) ("Shallow"/"7 Rings"/"My Silver Lining" performed by Malte Ebert, Sofie Linde and Audtionees)

Contestants' performances on the seventh live show
| Act | Order | Judge's Choice Song | Order | Producer's Choice Song | Producer | Order | Winner's single | Result |
|---|---|---|---|---|---|---|---|---|
| Benjamin Rosenbohm | 1 | "Be Alright" | 4 | "Lost" | Malthe Rostrup | 8 | "Worth a Broken Heart" | Runner-Up |
| Kristian Kjærlund | 2 | "Do I Wanna Know?" | 5 | "Green Light" | Nicolai Kornerup | 7 | "Lost and Profound" | Winner |
| Live Vogel | 3 | "Finale på et filmset" | 6 | "Special" | Malthe Rostrup | N/A | N/A (Already eliminated) | 3rd Place |
