= Gavyn Bailey =

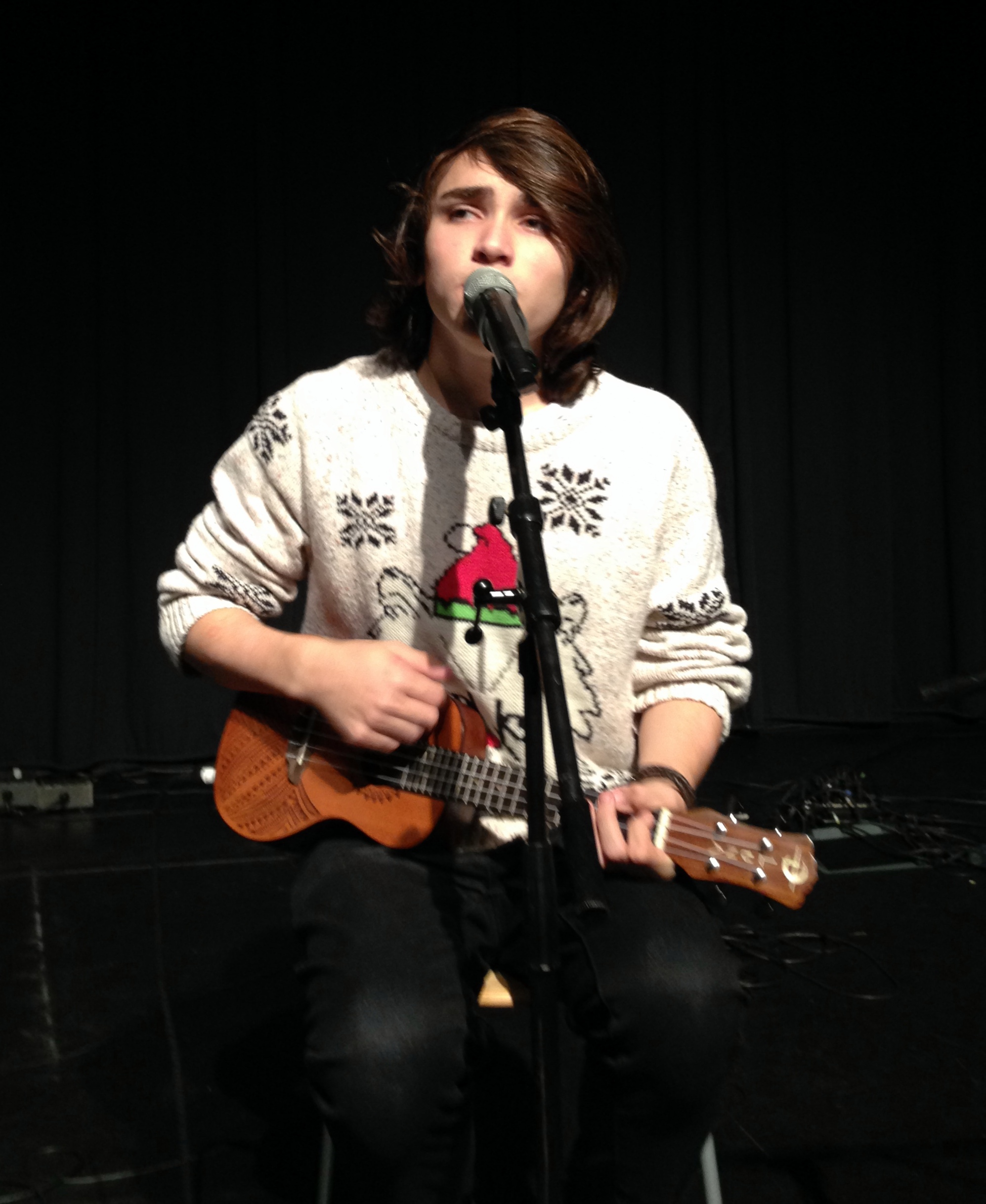
- Gavyn in 2013.

Background information
- Born: May 29, 1998 (age 28); Laguna Niguel, CA, U.S.
- Genre: singer-songwriter
- Occupations: Artist; Songwriter; Producer; Podcast host
- Instruments: Vocals; guitar; ukulele
- Years active: 2013–present
- Labels: Bump into Genius Music, Warner/Chappell Music
- Website: www.gavynbailey.com

Gavyn Matthew Bailey (born May 29, 1998) is an American singer, songwriter, producer, and podcast host. He entered the music industry with his first EP, Sickly in Love, in 2013, which reached number four on the iTunes Singer/Songwriter Charts. Bailey’s music has been featured on MTV's Degrassi and FreeForm's Party of Five (2020 TV series). In 2016, he signed a publishing deal with Bump Into Genius and Warner/Chappell Music. He is a co-writer of "Ville Ønske Jeg Havde Kendt Dig" performed by Emil, which placed third at the 2020 Dansk Melodi Grand Prix.

In January 2021, Bailey, along with Haley Chapman, co-founded "And That's That On That," an entertainment and music interview podcast, which debuted in the Top 50 Music Interview Charts on Apple Podcasts.

== Discography ==
EPs

- Sickly in Love (2013)

Singles

- Golden Gate (2023)
- Change Your Mind (2020)
- Grass Is Never Greener (2020)
- Numb Me, Bad (2019)
- No Space (2019)
- Fragile (2015)

=== Songwriting discography ===
Year	Artist	Album	Song	Credits
2020	Emil		"Ville Ønske Jeg Havde Kendt Dig"	Co-writer
2019	Moody		"The Breakup"	Co-writer
2019	Moody		"Gotta Get Up"	Co-writer
2019	Dylan Jordan		"without u"	Co-writer
2018	Xenia		"Love You Give Away"	Co-writer
2017	Tim Schou		"Novocaine"	Co-writer, producer

== Personal life ==
Bailey was born with kidney failure and received his first kidney transplant at 3 years old. After the transplanted kidney eventually failed, he underwent a second transplant in December of 2025, after over a year on dialysis. His brother, Landyn, donated his kidney through a paired exchange program for living-donors through Mayo Clinic, which ultimately enabled Bailey to receive a compatible match.

He has also spoken publicly about his past and present experiences with mental health and has served as an ambassador for Children's Hospital of Orange County's Mental Health Initiative.
