= Sebastian Lind =

Danish singer-songwriter (born 1988)

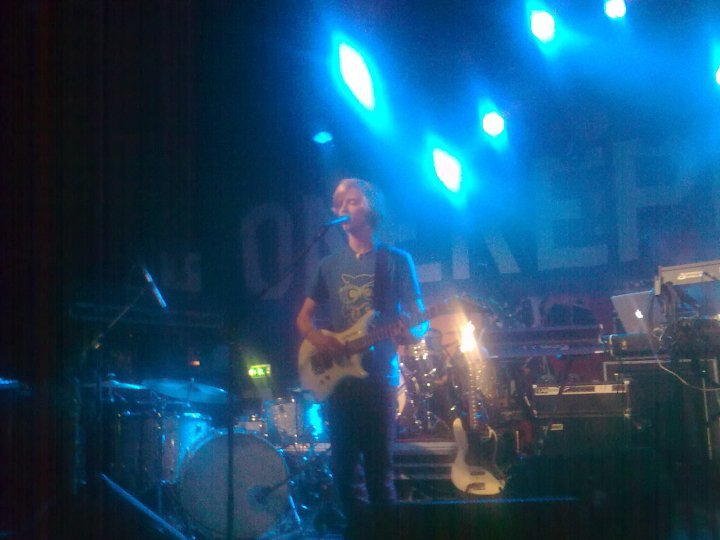

Background information
- Born: Sebastian Lind Hansen; 28 August 1988 (age 37); Denmark
- Years active: 2009–2016; 2020–present
- Label: Universal
- Website: sebastianlind.dk

Sebastian Lind (born Sebastian Lind Hansen; 28 August 1988) is a Danish singer-songwriter.

He released his first single "Stop These Feet", on 24 September 2011 and toured with Mads Langer on the first half of his 2009–10 tour, as supporting act.

He released his first album Sebastian Lind, on 17 May 2010, and released an EP called I Will Follow on 26 September 2011.

In April 2012 he supported Marit Larsen on her tour in Germany for five concerts.

== Discography ==
=== Albums ===
Year	Title	Peak chart positions	
Year	Title	DEN	GER
2010	Sebastian Lind	—	—
2011	I Will Follow	—	99
2013	Messed Up Happy Kid	23	—
2020	Never See You Like That	—	—
"—" denotes items which were not released in that country or failed to chart.

=== EPs ===
- 2011: I Will Follow

=== Singles ===
- 2009: "Stop These Feet"
- 2010: "Wait and See"
- 2012: "Get You"
- 2016: "Unreal"
- 2016: "Until I Die, pt. 1"
- 2016: "Until I Die, pt. 2"
- 2017: "Break"
- 2019: "Destiny"
- 2019: "Animal"
- 2019: "Run Away"
- 2019: "Hungry"
- 2021: "Bleeding God"
- 2021: "That Mood”
- 2021: "Endless Chase"
- 2021: "Life is Strange"
