= Alma Agger =

Danish singer

- Born: Christianshavn, Copenhagen, Denmark
- Origin: Copenhagen, Denmark
- Genres: Pop
- Occupation: Singer
- Instrument: Vocals
- Years active: 2020–present
- Labels: Sony Music

Alma Agger is a Danish singer. She was the winner of the thirteenth season of the Danish version of the X Factor.

== Performances during X Factor ==
| Episode | Theme | Song | Artist | Result |
|---|---|---|---|---|
| Audition | Free choice | "If I Ain't Got You" | Alicia Keys | Through to 5 Chair Challenge |
| 5 Chair Challenge | Free choice | "Daddy Lessons" | Beyoncé featuring Dixie Chicks | Through to bootcamp |
| Bootcamp | Free choice | "Idontwannabeyouanymore" | Billie Eilish | Through to live shows |
| Live show 1 | Signature | "Unforgettable" | French Montana Featuring Swae Lee | Safe (3rd) |
| Live show 2 | Songs from the 1980s | "In the Air Tonight" | Phil Collins | Safe (2nd) |
| Live show 3 | Songs with a message | "Swim Good" | Frank Ocean | Safe (1st) |
| Live show 4 – Semi-final | Songs from musicals | "Bigger" | Beyoncé | Safe (2nd) |
| Live show 5 – Final (Friday) | Judge's Choice | "Everything I Wanted" | Billie Eilish | Safe (1st) |
| Live show 5 – Final (Friday) | Duet with a Special Guest | "Lonely"/"Nudes" (with Jada) | Jada | Safe (1st) |
| Live show 5 – Final (Saturday) | Winner's song | "The Last Dance" | Clare Maguire | Winner |

== Discography ==
=== Singles ===
- "The Last Dance" (2020)
- "Om Lidt Er Jeg På Vej" (2020)
- "Hver For Sig" (2020)
- "Uundgåelig" (2021)

=== EPs ===
- "Alma Agger" (2021)

| Preceded by Kristian Kjærlund | X Factor (Denmark) winner 2020 | Succeeded by Solveig Lindelof |
