= Nina Kreutzmann Jørgensen =

Greenlandic singer

Nina Kreutzmann Jørgensen (born 1977) is a Greenlandic-Danish singer who is popular in both Greenland and Denmark. From the 1990s, she was the lead singer in the rock band Qulleq. She has frequently performed on Danish television, especially in connection with Julehilsen til Grønland , a Christmas greetings programme.

== Biography ==
Born on 17 July 1977 in Nuuk, Nina Kreutzmann Jørgensen began to sing at an early age, frequently attending music schools and receiving singing training in Denmark. Singing in Greenlandic, she soon became Greenland's most popular female singer. She is married to the singer and guitarist Malik Olsen, whom she met in high school. After singing with Olsen, Julie Berthelsen and the Ole Kristiansen band, in 1997 they formed Qulleq, recording their first album Qulleq lissinnut (Qulleq To You) with Nina as the lead singer.

In 2000, Nina became a member of the Icelandic singer Björk's Greenland choir, performing a short solo piece while on tour in 2001. That year, she was also included in the album Zedna, featuring Greenland's most popular singers. In 2008, she was one of the artists featured on the album Eqqissineq (Peace) which sold over 6,500 copies in Greenland in 2009, winning "gold" status. She toured in Greenland and Denmark in 2008 and 2009. The following year, she was the lead singer in Julie Berthelsen's choir, appearing on TV2's Allstars.

In addition to her singing career, Nina works as a teacher at the Nuuk international school, where she also teaches music. She considers teaching her vocation: "It means so much to me to communicate music to the children. To see them develop, gain confidence and begin to perform."

As of 2026, Nina was living in Nuuk with her partner, Niviaq Korneliussen, and their son.
