= Love Is Forever (Leonora song) =

2019 song by Leonora

Single by Leonora
- Released: 1 February 2019
- Length: 3:01
- Label: TheArrangement
- Songwriter(s): Lise Cabble; Melanie Wehbe; Emil Rosendal Lei
- Producer(s): Emil Rosendal Lei

Leonora singles chronology
"Love Is Forever" (2019)	"Turquoise" (2020)

Music video
- "Love Is Forever" on YouTube

Eurovision Song Contest 2019 entry
- Country: Denmark
- Artist(s): Leonora
- Languages: English; French; Danish; German
- Composer(s): Lise Cabble; Melanie Wehbe; Emil Rosendal Lei
- Lyricist(s): Lise Cabble; Melanie Wehbe; Emil Rosendal Lei

Finals performance
- Semi-final result: 10th
- Semi-final points: 94
- Final result: 12th
- Final points: 120

Entry chronology
- ◄ "Higher Ground" (2018)
- "Yes" (2020) ►

"Love Is Forever" is a song by Danish singer Leonora that was Denmark's entry at the Eurovision Song Contest 2019 in Tel Aviv. It is the first multilingual entry from Denmark in Eurovision and also the first Danish entry with Danish lyrics since the removal of the language rule in 1999. It was performed at the second semi-final on 16 May 2019, and qualified for the final, where it placed 12th with 120 points.

== Eurovision Song Contest ==
The song represented Denmark in the Eurovision Song Contest 2019, after Leonora was chosen through Dansk Melodi Grand Prix 2019, the music competition that selects Denmark's entries for the Eurovision Song Contest. On 28 January 2019, a special allocation draw was held which placed each country into one of the two semi-finals, as well as which half of the show they would perform in. Denmark was placed into the second semi-final, held on 16 May 2019, and was scheduled to perform in the first half of the show. Once all the competing songs for the 2019 contest had been released, the running order for the semi-finals was decided by the show's producers rather than through another draw, so that similar songs were not placed next to each other. Denmark performed in position 7 and qualified for the final on 18 May 2019. Denmark performed sixth in the final. At the end of the voting, the song had received 120 points, ending 12th.

== Charts ==
Chart (2019)	Peak position
Denmark (Tracklisten)	16
Lithuania (AGATA)	69
Scotland (OCC)	77
Sweden Heatseeker (Sverigetopplistan)	12
UK Singles Downloads (OCC)	61
