= Lise Cabble =

Danish singer and songwriter

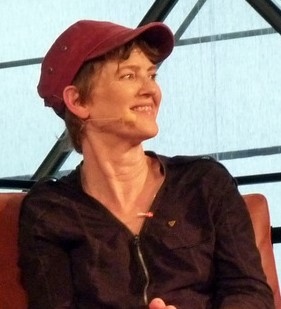
Lise Cabble in an interview in 2013.

Lise Cabble (born 10 January 1958, in Amager) is a Danish singer and songwriter. Cabble has written more than ten songs for Dansk Melodi Grand Prix and Eurovision Song Contest performers. Notable songs include the 1995 Danish song Fra Mols til Skagen (co-written with Mette Mathiesen and performed by Aud Wilken) and the winner of the Eurovision Song Contest 2013, Only Teardrops (co-written with Julia Fabrin Jakobsen and Thomas Stengaard and performed by Emmelie de Forest).

From the early 1980s to the late 1990s, Cabble was the lead singer in the all female rock bands Clinic Q and then Miss B. Haven.

== Selected credits ==
- 1991: "Sidste nummer" written with Mette Mathiesen, performed by Kim Larsen
- 1995: "Fra Mols til Skagen" written with Mette Mathiesen, performed by Aud Wilken as the Danish entry to the Eurovision Song Contest 1995 in Dublin, Ireland.
- 2000: "Uden dig" written with Mette Mathiesen, performed by Sanne Gottlieb
- 2001: "Tog Jeg Fejl" written with Mette Mathiesen, performed by Sanne Gottlieb
- 2008: "When Tomorrow Comes" written with Braager and Jepsen, performed by Michael Learns to Rock
- 2008: "Løgumkloster" performed by Marianne van Toornburg
- 2008: "Kortslutning" written with Jonas Krag and Boe Larsen, performed by Celina Ree
- 2008: "Catwoman" written with Borch, performed by Johnny Deluxe
- 2008: "Blue Christmas" written with Zorde and Klein, performed by Peter Frødin
- 2008: "Hooked on You" written with Lasse Lindorff and Mogens Binderup, performed by Lasse Lindorff
- 2009: "Big Bang Baby" written with duo Nordstrøm, performed by Claus Christensen
- 2009: "Det' det" written with Mogens Binderup and Lasse Lindorff, performed by Sukkerchok
- 2009: "Taxa" written with Zorde and Mogens Binderup, performed by Sanne Salomonsen
- 2009: "Hel igen" written with Krag and Mogens Binderup, performed by Sanne Salomonsen
- 2009: "Kun dig" written with Rune Braager and MariaMatilde Band, performed by MariaMatilde Band
- 2009: "Rocket" written with Halvor Jensen and Fält, performed by Mohamed Ali
- 2010: "Kæmper for kærlighed" written with Lasse Lindorff and Martin Michael Larsson, performed by Sukkerchok
- 2010: "Come Come Run Away" written with Munk, performed by Silas & Kat
- 2011: "New Tomorrow" written with Jakob Glæsner, performed by A Friend In London as the Danish entry to the Eurovision Song Contest 2011 in Düsseldorf, Germany.
- 2012: "Universe" written with Simon Borch and Boe Larsen, performed by Karen Viuff
- 2013: "Only Teardrops" written with Julia Fabrin Jakobsen and Thomas Stengaard, performed by Emmelie de Forest as the Danish entry to the Eurovision Song Contest 2013 in Malmö, Sweden, which it won.
- 2015: "Tæt på mine drømme" written with Maria Danielle Andersen and Jacob Glæsner, performed by Julie Bjerre in Dansk Melodi Grand Prix 2015
- 2018: "Starlight" performed by Anna Ritsmar in Dansk Melodi Grand Prix 2018
- 2019: "Love Is Forever" written with Melanie Wehbe and Emil Lei, performed by Leonora as the Danish entry to the Eurovision Song Contest 2019 in Tel Aviv, Israel.
- 2021: "Silver Bullet" written with Gisli Gislason, Rasmus Soeegren and August Emil, performed by The Cosmic Twins in Dansk Melodi Grand Prix 2021.
