= Hymns from Nineveh =

Danish pop folk musical project

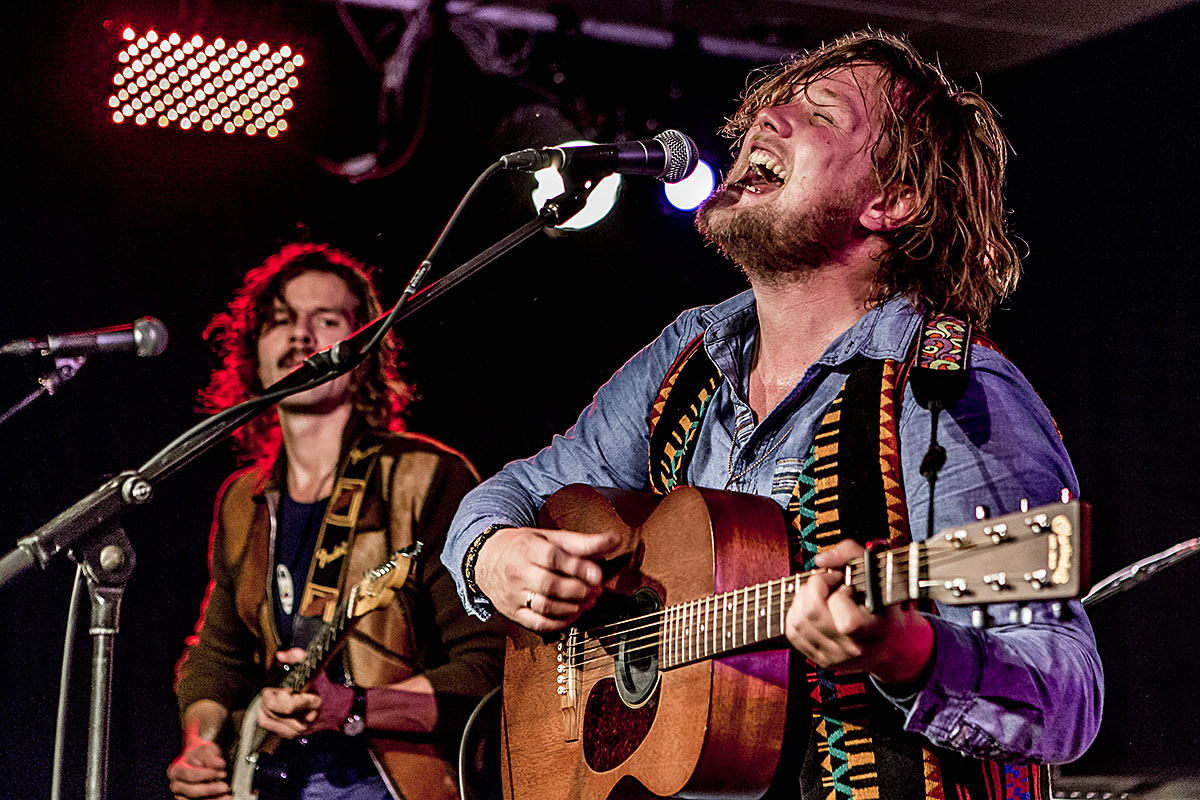

Background information
- Origin: Denmark
- Genres: Indiepop
- Years active: 2007–present
- Labels: Warner Music Denmark
- Members: Jonas Petersen; Live band: Nikolaj Paakjær, Jakob Brixen, Jacob Haubjerg, Carl Andreas Brixen
- Website: www.hymns.dk

Hymns from Nineveh is a pop folk musical project of Danish singer and guitarist Jonas Petersen established in 2007 and signed to Warner Music Denmark.

Jonas Petersen started with the 4-member indiepop band Attrap in 2006 and appeared in DR P3 program Elektriske Barometer. Although Attrap's release House of Dreams and the track "1234" found critical acclaim, the project folded in 2007.

After Attrap, Petersen started his solo music project Hymns from Nineveh, with live performances by Petersen (vocals and guitar), Nikolaj Paakjær (piano, organ and synthesizer), Jakob Brixen (electric guitar, banjo and shahi baaja, a type of Indian sitar), Jacob Haubjerg (bass) and Carl Andreas Brixen (drums). It took part in a number of festivals and live events.

The initial recording was the EP Uncomplicated Christmassongs, on 30 November 2009 followed on 21 February 2011 by the official debut self-titled album Hymns from Nineveh. The Danish music site Gaffa considered the album as the best Danish album of 2011. The band also released on 22 November of the same year a follow-up Endurance in Christmas Time.

In September 2013, the band released Vision supported by Parlophone Music.

== Discography ==
=== Albums ===
Year	Album	Peak positions	Certification
Year	Album	DEN	Certification
2011	Hymns From Nineveh	7	
2011	Endurance In Christmas Time	33	
2013	Visions	5	
2016	Sunday Music	-	

=== EPs ===
Year	Album	Peak positions	Certification
Year	Album	DEN	Certification
2009	Uncomplicated Christmassongs	–	
