= Julie Berthelsen =

Danish-Greenlandic musician (born 1979)

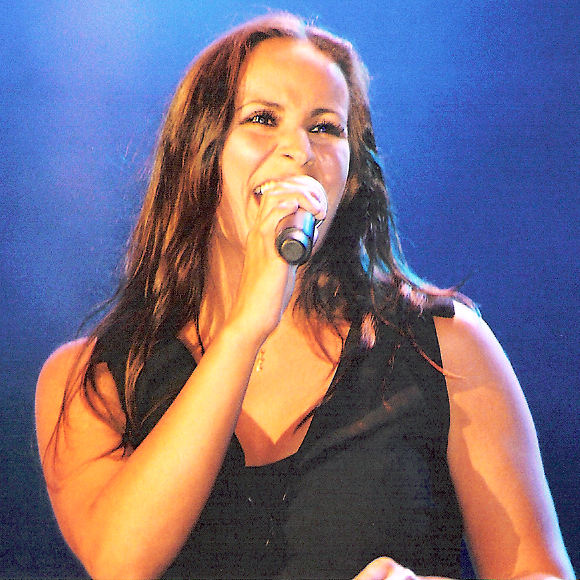
- Tivoli Garden, Copenhagen 15 June 2007

Background information
- Born: Julie Ivalo Broberg Berthelsen; 7 June 1979 (age 46); Århus, Denmark
- Origin: Nuuk, Greenland; Kingdom of Denmark
- Genres: Pop
- Occupations: Singer; songwriter; actress
- Years active: 1994–present
- Website: www.julie.gl

Julie Ivalo Broberg Berthelsen (born 7 June 1979), also known by her mononym Julie, is a Danish-born Greenlandic pop singer, songwriter, and actress. She is known largely for her success on the TV series Popstars. Although she finished in second place, she has become more popular and successful than the first-place winner. She grew up in Nuuk, the capital of Greenland.

Julie has given a variety of performances, the most noteworthy of which was at Christiansborg Palace, in front of the Danish Royal family for the wedding of Crown Prince Frederik and Crown Princess Mary in May 2004. Another performance worthy of note was her rendition of the Beatles song "Ob-La-Di, Ob-La-Da" on 22 November 2008 at The White Concert, held in Horsens, Denmark on the 40th anniversary of the release of "The Beatles" (a.k.a. "The White Album").

== Discography ==
Albums

- 2003: Home
- 2004: Julie
- 2006: Asasara
- 2009: Lige nu
- 2010: Closer

Singles

- 2002: "Every Little Part of Me"
- 2003: "Shout (Our Love Will Be the Light)"
- 2003: "Completely Fallen"
- 2004: "It's a Wonderful Feeling"
- 2014: "Jesus and Josephine" (with Martin Brygmann)
- 2019: "League of Light" (with Nina Kreutzmann Jørgensen)
