= List of churches in Gentofte Municipality =

This is a list of churches in Gentofte Municipality, Greater Copenhagen, Denmark.

== Church of Denmark ==
Name	Location	Year	Coordinates	Image	Refs
Dyssegård Church	Hellerup	1961	55°43′55″N 12°32′26.6″E		
Gentofte Church	Gentofte	c. 1100			
Hellerup Church	Hellerup	1900	55°44′3.6″N 12°34′23″E		
Helleruplund Church	Hellerup	1956	55°44′10.6″N 12°33′19″E		
Jægersborg Church	Jægersborg	1941	55°45′37.5″N 12°32′35.5″E		
Church of Mesias	Charlottenlund	1926	55°44′43″N 12°34′2″E		
Ordrup Church	Ordrup	1878	55°45′34.2″N 12°34′32″E		
Skovshoved Church	Skovshoved	c. 1915	55°45′45″N 12°35′34″E		
Vangede Church	Vangede	1976	55°44′49.8″N 12°34′17.8″E		

== Roman–Catholic ==
Name	Location	Year	Coordinates	Image	Refs
St. Andrew' Church	Ordrup	1873	55°45′42.9″N 12°34′8.7″E		
St. Theresa' Church	Hellerup	1935	55°43′51″N 12°33′20″E		

== See also ==
- List of Churches in Gladsaxe municipality
