= Benjamin Hav =

Danish rapper (born 1985)

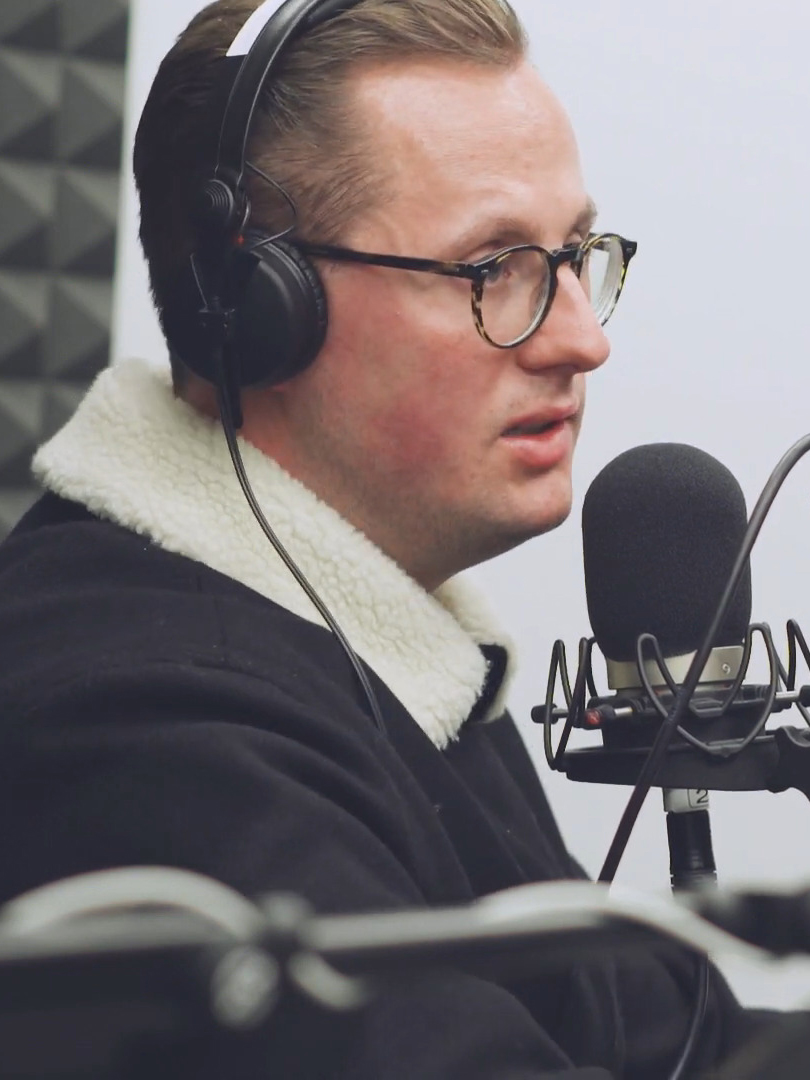
- Hav in 2019

Background information
- Born: Mads Benjamin Kortland Hav; 12 June 1985 (age 41); Østerbro, Denmark
- Genre: Hip hop
- Occupations: Rapper, musician
- Member of: Benal

Mads Benjamin Kortland Hav (born 12 June 1985) is a Danish rapper and musician. He debuted in 2013 with the EP Baby with producer Magnus Albert Wanscher in the duo Benal. The duo has received several awards for their releases.

In 2020, Hav became a solo artist with the albums Spice Up Your Life and Dit syge dyr. The following year, he released the album Tesla with the disco track "Den dejligste boy" which went platinum in Denmark. He received the Gaffa Award for Hip Hop Album of the Year in 2022 for the album Tesla. In recent years, he has worked as a solo artist with "Familien", his musical collective and backing band, and in 2023 he received the Gaffa Award for Livenavn of the Year 2023. His fourth studio album Jeg vil bare gerne være et godt menneske, men det er ikke let was released on 31 January 2025, after he announced in an interview with Euroman that it would be released on that date.

In 2026, Hav was featured as a judge on the nineteenth season of the Danish entertainment program X Factor, ultimately mentoring the winner of the season.

== Early life ==
Hav was born on 12 June 1985, in Østerbro, Copenhagen. He is the son of Danish lyricist Niels Hav, and his mother worked as a nurse and social worker. He grew up on Willemoesgade in Østerbro. He and his family originally lived in Jebjerg in Salling, but moved to Copenhagen due to his father's work. Hav has two older sisters, born in 1975 and 1972, and a younger sister born in 2001. Hav's parents divorced when Hav was 13 years old, and Hav and his mother moved into an apartment complex close to Willemoesgade. When Hav turned 20, his mother moved out of the apartment, while he remained there. He later exchanged apartments and moved into his current home in the same building.

Hav played soccer as a child, and at the age of 12, he began playing piano, bass, drums, and singing in various youth bands inspired by Nirvana, Deep Purple, and The Cranberries. At the age of 13, he wrote and submitted a rap song to the P3 program Frankies Julespecial, which held a song contest. Hav won the competition and received as a prize the finished production of his song in collaboration with Kenn 'The Killer' Haunstoft from the Danish eurodance group Cargo. Hav has stated that he smoked hash daily between the ages of 14 and 23.

== Career ==
Hav worked as an administrative employee at a job center and later as a communications coach at the Danish call center, LN Eurocom, while also producing music in his spare time. At one point, Hav began making music with producer Adam Sampler, and through him, Hav came into contact with Danish rapper Pede B and producers Lukas Lunderskov and Casper Simonsen from the record label Beskidt Lyd in 2011. Through Pede B, Hav also managed to get gigs, where he performed under the alias Benjah. In 2011, Hav met producer Magnus Albert Wanscher through Pede B. Hav and Wanscher began collaborating and formed the duo Benal in 2012. In 2013, Benal participated in P3's KarriereKanonen, but did not win. Benal officially disbanded in 2019.

A year later, in 2020, Hav debuted as solo artist with his first two albums, Spice Up Your Life and Dit syge dyr. The following year, in 2021, he released his third album Tesla with the disco track "Den dejligste boy" which was certified platinum in Denmark. He received the Gaffa Award for Hip Hop Album of the Year in 2022 for Tesla.

In January 2023, Hav announced his Denmark tour, “Big Show!”. Hav and his live band Familien kicked off the tour on 26 October 2023, in Greve and finished the tour on 2 December 2023, at Royal Arena after playing 15 venues across the country.

That same year, Hav he received the Gaffa Award for Livenavn of the Year 2023, and launched the YouTube channel Benjamin's World, where he posts weekly videos featuring people and experiences that pique his curiosity.

Hav's fourth studio album Jeg vil bare gerne være et godt menneske, men det er ikke let was released on 31 January 2025, after he announced the album in an interview with Danish men's magazine Euroman.

In August 2025, TV 2 announced that Hav would be a new judge on the upcoming season of the Danish version of the entertainment program X Factor. Hav took over from Simon Kvamm and became a judge alongside Thomas Blachman and Drew Sycamore. Hav was the winning mentor when his final contestant Hugo A won the competition.

== Personal life ==
Hav is married to Mille Kortland Hav. The couple has two daughters, as well as a bonus daughter from his wife's previous relationship.

Hav has Asymmetric crying facies (ACF), which manifests itself in the muscles on the left side of his lower lip being underdeveloped or paralyzed, causing his smile to appear crooked.

== Discography ==
=== Studio albums ===
Title	Details	Peak chart positions	Certifications
Title	Details	DEN	Certifications
Spice Up Your LIfe	Released: 3 January 2020; Label: Sony Music Denmark	2	DEN: Gold
Dit syge dyr	Released: 10 January 2020; Label: Sony Music Denmark	10	
Tesla	Released: 5 March 2021; Label: Sony Music Denmark	5	DEN: Platinum
Jeg vil bare gerne være et godt menneske, men det er ikke let	Released: 31 January 2025; Label: Sony Music Denmark	2	DEN: Platinum

=== Singles ===
Title	Details	Peak chart positions	Certifications
Title	Details	DEN	Certifications
"Air Tonight" (Emil Kruse featuring Benjamin Hav)	Released: 22 March 2019; Label: Universal Music Denmark	20	DEN: Platinum
"Nik & Jay" (TopGunn featuring Benjamin Hav)	Released: 26 April 2019; Label: Ung & Eksponeret	8	DEN: 2× Platinum
"Plastic" (Pind featuring Benjamin Hav)	Released: 15 November 2019; Label: Sony Music Denmark	—	DEN: Platinum
"Musse"	Released: 3 January 2020; Label: Sony Music Denmark	—	DEN: Gold
"Spice Up Your Life"	Released: 3 January 2020; Label: Sony Music Denmark	—	DEN: Gold
"Tættere end vi tror" (P3 featuring Benjamin Hav, Christopher, Clara, Don Stefano, Jada, Lukas Graham, Mads Langer and Tessa)	Released: 27 April 2020; Label: DR Salg	1	DEN: Platinum
"The Show Must Go On"	Released: 22 May 2020; Label: Sony Music Denmark	—	
"Hold min Hånd"	Released: 24 July 2020; Label: Sony Music Denmark	—	
"Den dejligste Boy"	Released: 5 February 2021; Label: Sony Music Denmark	28	DEN: Platinum
"T-Pain" (with Larry 44)	Released: 6 August 2021; Label: Sony Music Denmark	31	
"Cannelloni & Kød"	Released: 19 November 2021; Label: Sony Music Denmark	—	DEN: Gold
"Hvidt Flag" (Thomas Helmig featuring Benjamin Hav)	Released: 3 June 2022; Label: Sony Music Denmark	—	
"Esbjerg, torden og regn"	Released: 26 May 2023; Label: Sony Music Denmark	—	
"Sirjegsindssyg" (Lamin and Artigeardit featuring Benjamin Hav)	Released: 1 September 2023; Label: Universal Denmark	26	
"Første dag" (featuring Ella Augusta)	Released: 13 October 2023; Label: Sony Music Denmark	12	DEN: 3× Platinum
"København" (Rune Rask and TooManyLeftHands featuring Suspekt and Benjamin Hav)	Released: 29 May 2024; Label: Tabu Records	3	DEN: Platinum
"Husk at vær' Happy"	Released: 14 June 2024; Label: Sony Music Denmark	40	
"Du ligner din mor" (with Lukas Graham)	Released: 27 December 2024; Label: Sony Music Denmark	1	
"Portugal"	Released: 22 May 2026; Label: Sony Music Denmark	14	DEN: Gold
"Larger Than Life" (Christopher featuring Benjamin Hav)	Released: 9 October 2026; Label: EMI Nordic	3	
"—" denotes a single that did not chart or was not released in that territory.
