= Aage Rafn =

Danish architect

Aage Ragn
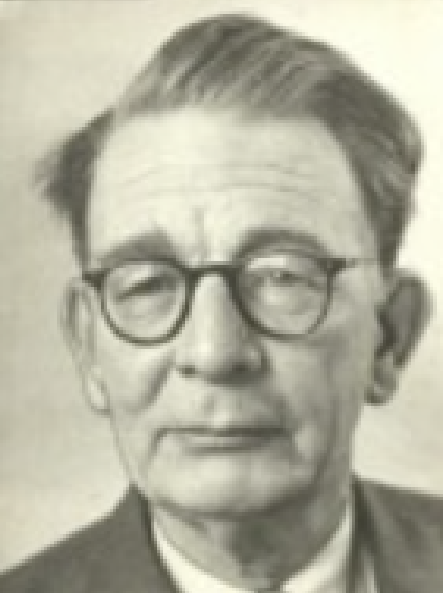
- Born: 21 April 1890; Copenhagen, Denmark
- Died: 7 May 1953 (aged 63); Ordrup, Denmark
- Occupation: Architect
- Awards: Eckersberg Medal (1936)

Signature
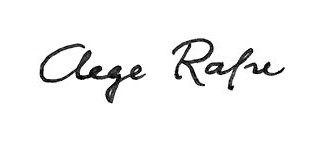

Aage Rafn (21 April 1890 – 7 May 1953) was a Danish architect and designer. He headed Kunsthåndværkerskolen in Copenhagen from 1924.

== Early life and education ==
Rafn was born on 21 April 1890 in Copenhagen, the son off Carl Hjalmar Rafn (1848–1919) and Anna Elisabeth Albertine Kaper (1867–1942).His father served as headmaster of the Metropolitan School from 1902 to 1918. His paternal grandfather was the antiquaria, writer and publisher Carl Christian Rafn. Rafn matriculated from Metropolitanskolen in 1908. He enrolled at the Royal Danish Academy of Fine Arts in 1909 and graduated from Kunstakademiets Arkitektskole in 1919. He won the academy's great gold medal in 1921.

== Career ==
Already as students, Rafn and Kay Fisker won 2nd prize in am architectural competition to design the stations on a new railway on Bornholm. They were later commissioned to design the stations with significant changes. Their railway stations were influenced by Martin Nyrop's National Romantic style. Like the majority of his contemporaries, Rafn would later work within the idioms of first Nordic Classicism and then Functionalism. He operated his own architectural studio from 1916. He also worked for Hack Kampmann on the new Copenhagen Police Headquarters (1918–24). Together with Holger Jacobsen and Kampmann's son Hans Jørgen Kampmann, he was responsible for completing the project after Kampmann's death.

In 1936, together with Hans Jørgen Kampmann, he was awarded the Rckersberg Medal for Vartov gl. Kloster on Lersø Park Allé in Copenhagen.

Rafn was also active as a designer of firniture, lamps and ceramics. He headed the Danish Museum of Arts and Crafts's Håndværkerskole in 1925–30 and the Danish Technical Society's Kunsthåndværkerskole in 1930–45.

== Personal life ==
On 1 October 1927, Rafn married Lucie Hoel (1903–). She was the daughter of engineer Johan Hoel (1866–1944) and Agnes Elisabeth Ohlsen (1876–1943).

Rafn died on 7 May 1953 and is buried at Mariebjerg Cemetery.

== List of works ==
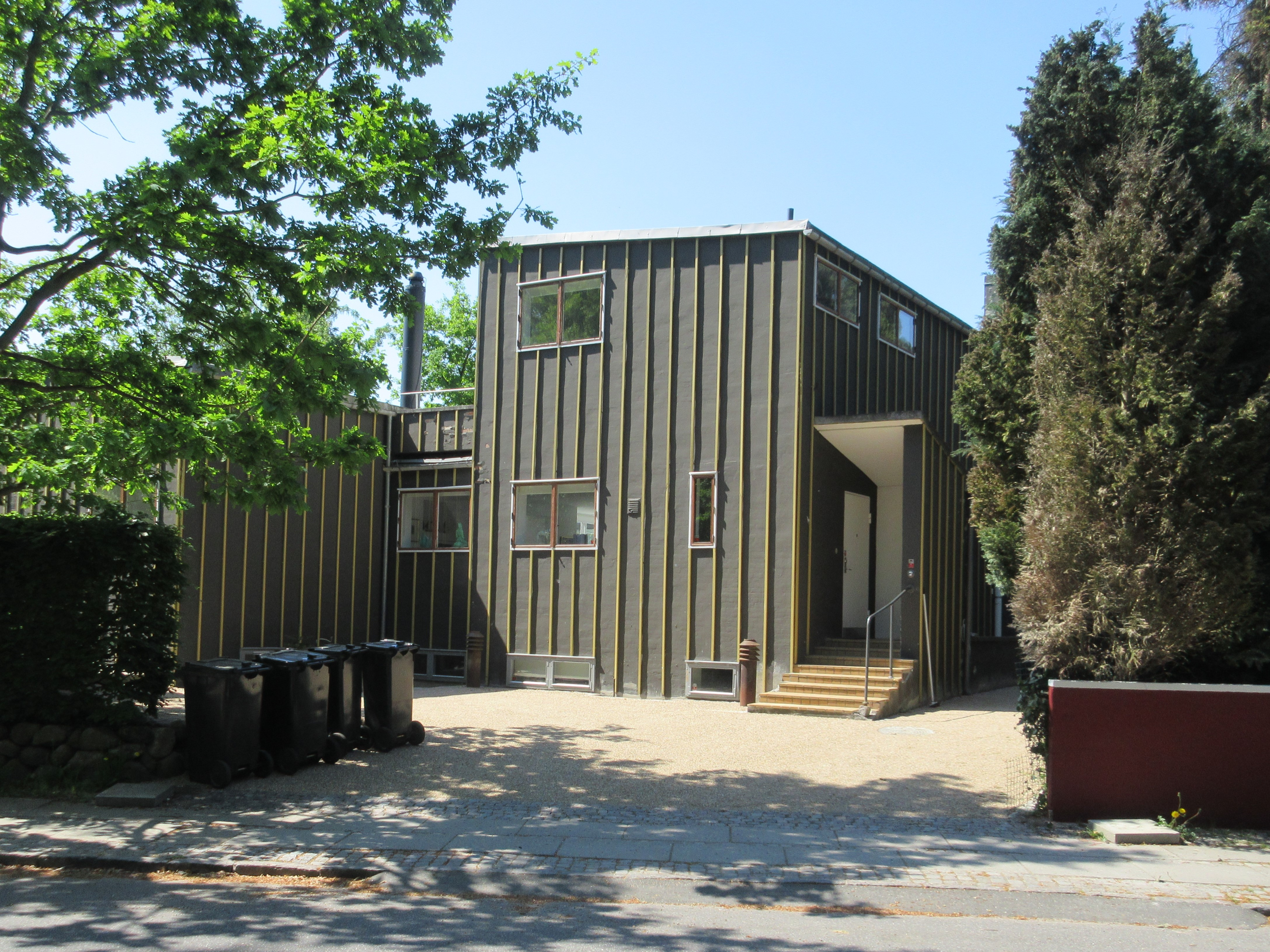
The Aage Rafn House at Krathusvej 8 in Ordrup.

- Stations of the Gudhjem Railway (with Kay Fisker, 1915–16)
  - Åløse Station
  - Ostermarie Station, Østermarie
  - Æsterlars Station, Østerlars
  - Gudhjem Station, Gudhjem
  - Christianshøj Station, Almindingen
- Copenhagen Police Headquarters, Polititorvet, Copenhagen (1918–24, with Hack Kampmann, Christian and Hans Jørgen Kampmann, Holger Jacobsen og Anton Frederiksen, listed)
- Gl. Vartov Vej 22, Hellerup (1920, præmieret 1921, expanded 1956, 1960, listed)
- Adaption of Store Mariendal, Strandvejen 135, Hellerup (1928, demolished)
- Købmandsbo, Frederikssundsvej 106 A-C, Copenhagen (1930, 1st årize with Kaj Gottlob and Hans Jørgen Kampmann)
- Skovvangen 18, Charlottenlund (1931)
- Sankt Lukas Stiftelsen, Bernstorffsvej 20, Hellerup (1931– started by Valdemar Birkmand)
  - Orphanage (1934)
  - Nursing home (1936)
- Løvgården, Søndre Fasanvej 25–69, Frederiksberg (1931, with Hans Jørgen Kampmann, also attributed to Peter Nielsen)
- Housing estate at Horsekildevej 22–48, Cæcilievej 9–13, Lauravej 1–25, Blankavej 12–16, Valby (1932, præmieret 1933, with Hans Jørgen Kampmann)
- Vartov gl. Kloster, Lersø Parkallé 28 A-X, Copenhagen (1934–36, diploma 1935, Eckersberg Medal 1936, with Hans Jørgen Kampmann)
- Christianshavns Vuggestue og Daghjem, Ved Stadsgraven 11–13, København (1935)
- Solgården, Skodsborg Strandvej 153–157, Skodsborg (1935, windows changed)
- Aage Tafn House, Krathusvej 7, Charlottenlund (1936, listed)
- Teknisk Skole, Julius Thomsens Gade 5, København (1938, udvidet med Den grafiske Højskole 1942–43, præmieret 1946, sammen med S.C. Larsen)
- Aldersrenteboliger for Københavns Kommune ved Bavnehøj Allé, Tranehavegård 1–43, 214, 22–38 Valby (1941, 1943, Bissen's Prize 1948)
- Renovation of Hellebækgård for Det Kongelige Opfostringshus, Hellebæk (1952)
