= Sankt Lukas Stiftelsen =

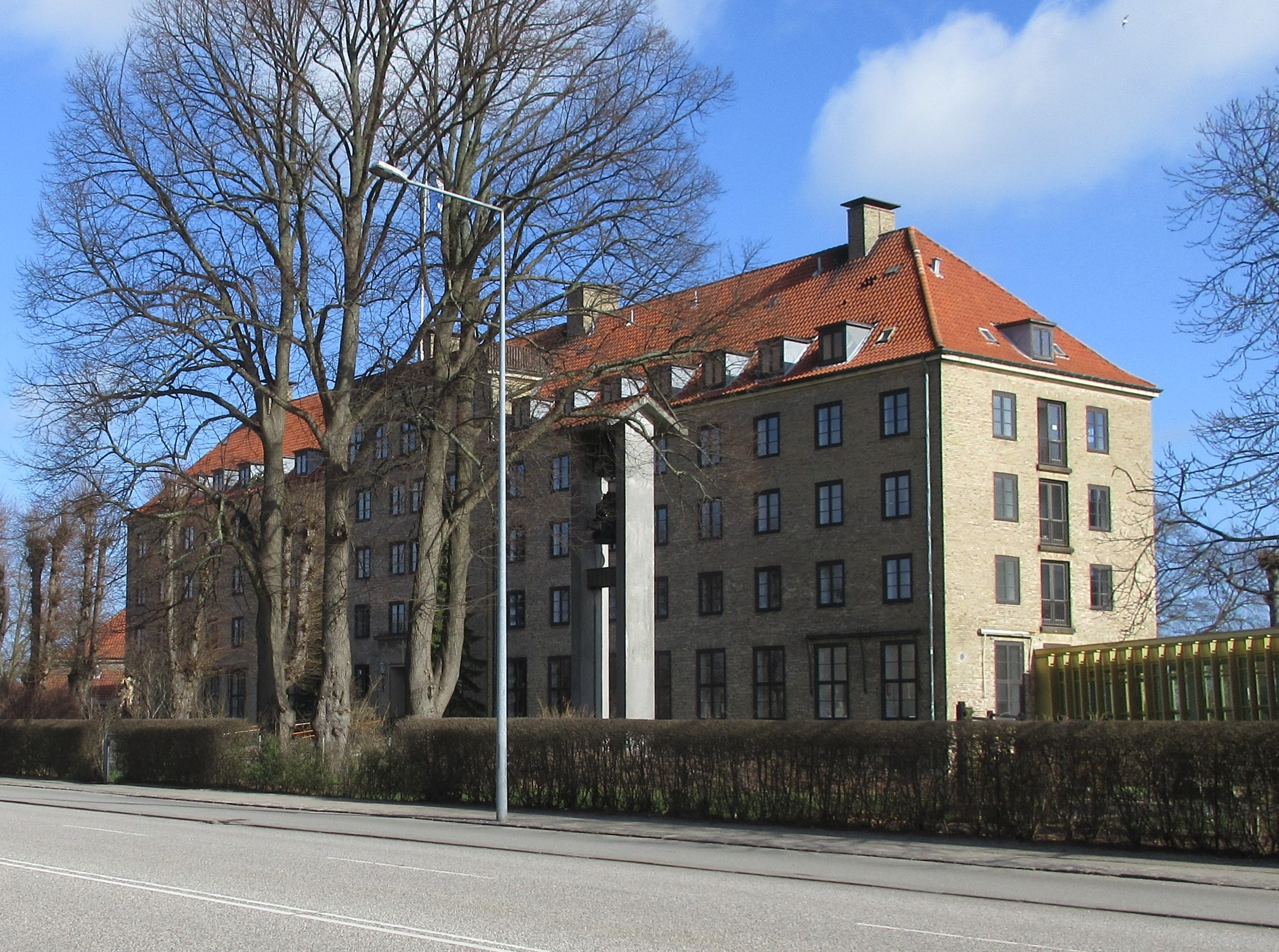
The main building at Bernstorffsvej 20

Sankt Lukas Stiftelsen is a Deacon institution located at Bernstorffsvej 20 in Hellerup, Gentofte Municipality, Copenhagen, Denmark.

== History ==
Sankt Lukas Stiftelsen was founded by Isabelle Brockenhuus-Løwenhielm and pastor Vilhelm Kold from Indre Mission on 8 May 1900. Its current premises were inaugurated in 1932. The land had previously belonged to the Lundegaard estate. The buildings were designed by the architect Valdemar Birkmand and Aage Rafn.

== Today ==
Sankt Lukas Stiftelsen comprises a home for the elderly, a daycare, a hospice and a cohousing community. The complex also comprises a chapel.

== People ==
=== Protectors ===
- 1934 – 1952: Queen Alexandrine
- 1953 – 1972: King Frederik IX
- 1973 – 2000: Queen Ingrid
- 2001 – Queen Margrethe II

=== Chairmen ===
- 1898 – 1926: O. Oxholm
- 1926 – 1932: Vilhelm Kold
- 1932 – 1937: E. Hvidberg
- 1937 – 1940: Kai Jensen
- 1940 – 1947: Hj. Cortsen
- 1947 – 1966: H.W. Sprechler
- 1966 – 1977: Poul Hartling
  - J.B. Leer Andersen
- 1978 – 1992: Henning Palludan
- 1992 – 1998: C.C. Jessen
- 1999 – 2007: Arne Oluf Andersen
- 2007 – 2008: Steen Hildebrandt
- 2008 – 2014: Arne Oluf Andersen
- 2014 – Nina Berrig
