= Alfred Cock-Clausen =

Danish architect (1886–1983)

Alf Cock-Clausen
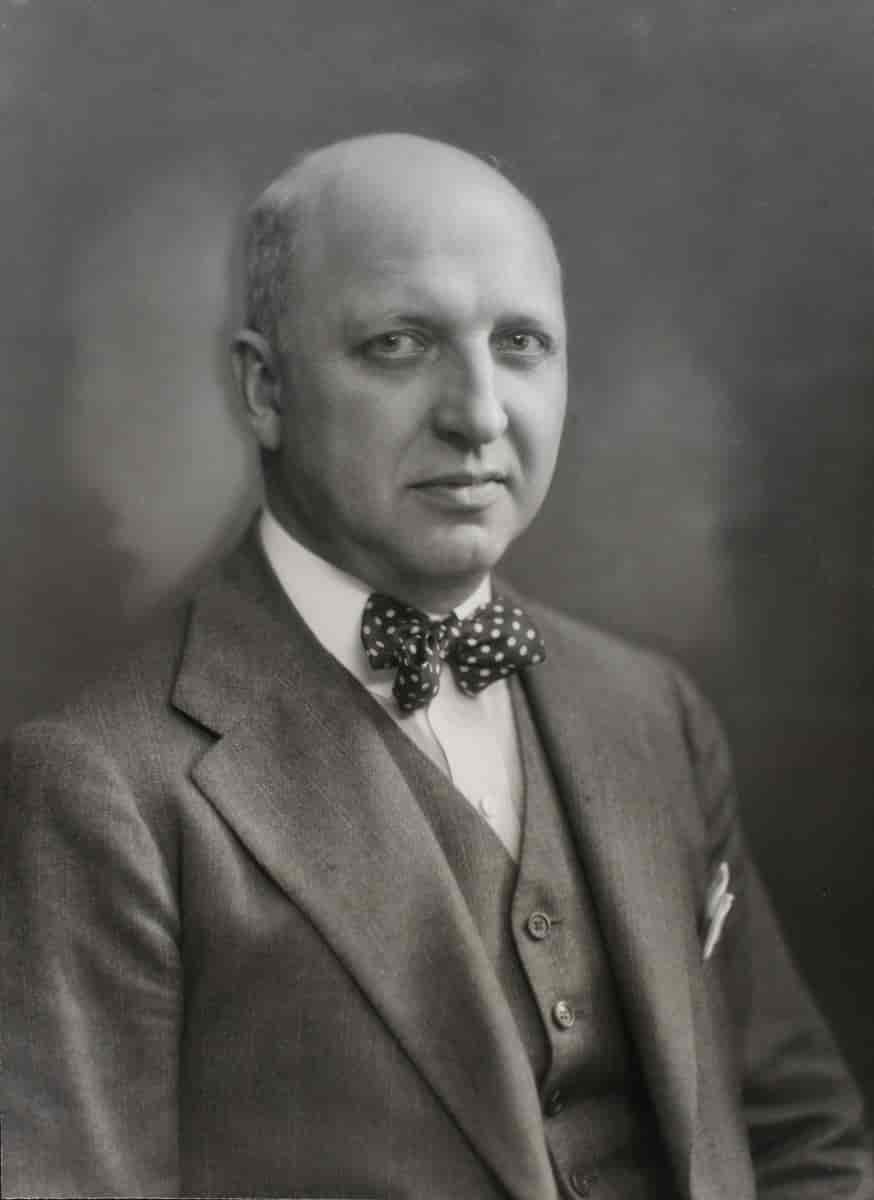
- Alf Cock-Clausen
- Born: 2 March 1886; Copenhagen, Denmark
- Died: 10 July 1983 (aged 97); Copenhagen, Denmark
- Resting place: Vestre Cemetery (Copenhagen)
- Education: Royal Danish Academy of Fine Arts
- Occupation: Architect
- Buildings: Guttenberghus

Alf Cock-Clausen (2 March 1886 – 10 July 1983) was a Danish architect. He was active during the transition from Neoclassicism to Functionalism and many of his works show influence from Art Deco. His factory for the distillery De Danske Spritfabrikker at Aalborg's harbour front was declared a Danish Industrial Heritage Site in 2009.

Other works include the headquarters of publisher Guttenberghus (now Egmont Media), now partly converted into the Danish Film Institute, and the Richshuset in Copenhagen.

== Early life and education ==
Alf Cock-Claussen was born in Copenhagen, the son of Ludvig Clausen who was also an architect, working at city architect Ludvig Fenger's office. He attended the Technical School in Copenhagen from 1894 to 1906 and studied architecture at the Royal Danish Academy of Fine Arts from 1905 until 1911. He won the Academy's small gold medal in 1913 and worked as a draughtsman and executing architect from 1905 until 1917, first for Hack Kampmann and later Gotfred Tvede. He traveled in Germany in 1910 and in Italy in 1913 on a scholarship from the Art Academy. In 1816 he received Theophilus Hansens Legat.

== Career ==
Cock-Claussen worked for De Danske Spritfabrikker (English: the Danish Distillers), designing numerous facilities around the country, including the factories in Hobro (1925), Aalborg (1929–1930), Randers, Slagelse, Roskilde (1941) and Copenhagen (in collaboration with Preben Hansen). Other notable works in Copenhagen include Gutenberghus at Gothersgade (1926–29, expanded 1935 and 1961), now the Danish Film Institute, the Richshuset at City Hall Square (1934–36) and St. Theresa's Church in Hellerup.

== Personal life ==
Cock-Clausen married Ellen Margrethe Tvede (1886–1980) in 1911. They were the parents of figure skater Per Cock-Clausen (1912– 2002). He died in Copenhagen in 1883 and was buried at Vestre Kirkegård.

== List of works ==
=== For De Danske Spritfabrikker ===
- Numerous works for De Danske Spritfabrikker: The architectural design of the factory core in Hobro (1925) and in Aalborg (1929–1930), Randers, Slagelse, Roskilde (1941) and Copenhagen (in collaboration with Preben Hansen), as well as the factories' experimental farms Frederikshøj at Aalborg and Jernbjerggaarden by Slagelse.

=== Other ===
- Two houses, Aalborg (1912)
- Villa, 29 Ehlersvej, Hellerup (1919)
- Villa,1 Louis Petersens Vej, Rungsted (1923)
- Villa, 76 Tuborgvej, Hellerup (1928)
- Villa, 50 Baunegårdsvej, Gentofte (1931)
- Villa, 6 Krathusvej, Ordrup (1933)
- Villa, 7 Granhøjen, Gentofte (1935)
- Main building, Vestergård, Stubbekøbing (1918)
- Main building, Trinderup (1941)
- Residential blocks, 39-51 Humlebækgade, Copenhagen (1923)
- Residential blocks, 7-13 Baunehøj Allé, Copenhagen (1929)
- Krogs Fiskerestaurant, 38 Gammel Strand, Copenhagen (1915–1916)
- Det Classenske Fideicommis' summer camps at Corselitze and Næsgård, Falster (1918)
- Femmers Kvindeseminarium, 50 Struenseegade (1922–23) and adaption for Metropolitanskolen (1938)
- Gutenberghus, 55 Gothersgade (1926–1929, now the Danish Film Institute) and 7-11 Vognmagergade (1935 and 1961)
- Stables, Basnæs (1926)
- Sct. Michaels Stiftelsen, later Rygaards School, 54 Bernstorffsvej, Hellerup (1934–35 and 1955)
- St. Theresa's Church, 56 Bernstorffsvej, Hellerup (1934–35)
- Richs Building, 16 Rådhuspladsen, Copenhagen (1934–36)
- Office and laboratory building, Grindstedværket, Aarhus (1949–51)
- Københavns Vognmandslaugs alderdomshjem, Brønshøj
- De Danske Sprængstoffabrikker, Jyderup (now Jyderup State Prison)
- Dansk-Fransk Dampskibsselskab,
- Den Københavnske Søassuranceforening, Copenhagen
- De Private Assurandører, Copenhagen

== Gallery ==
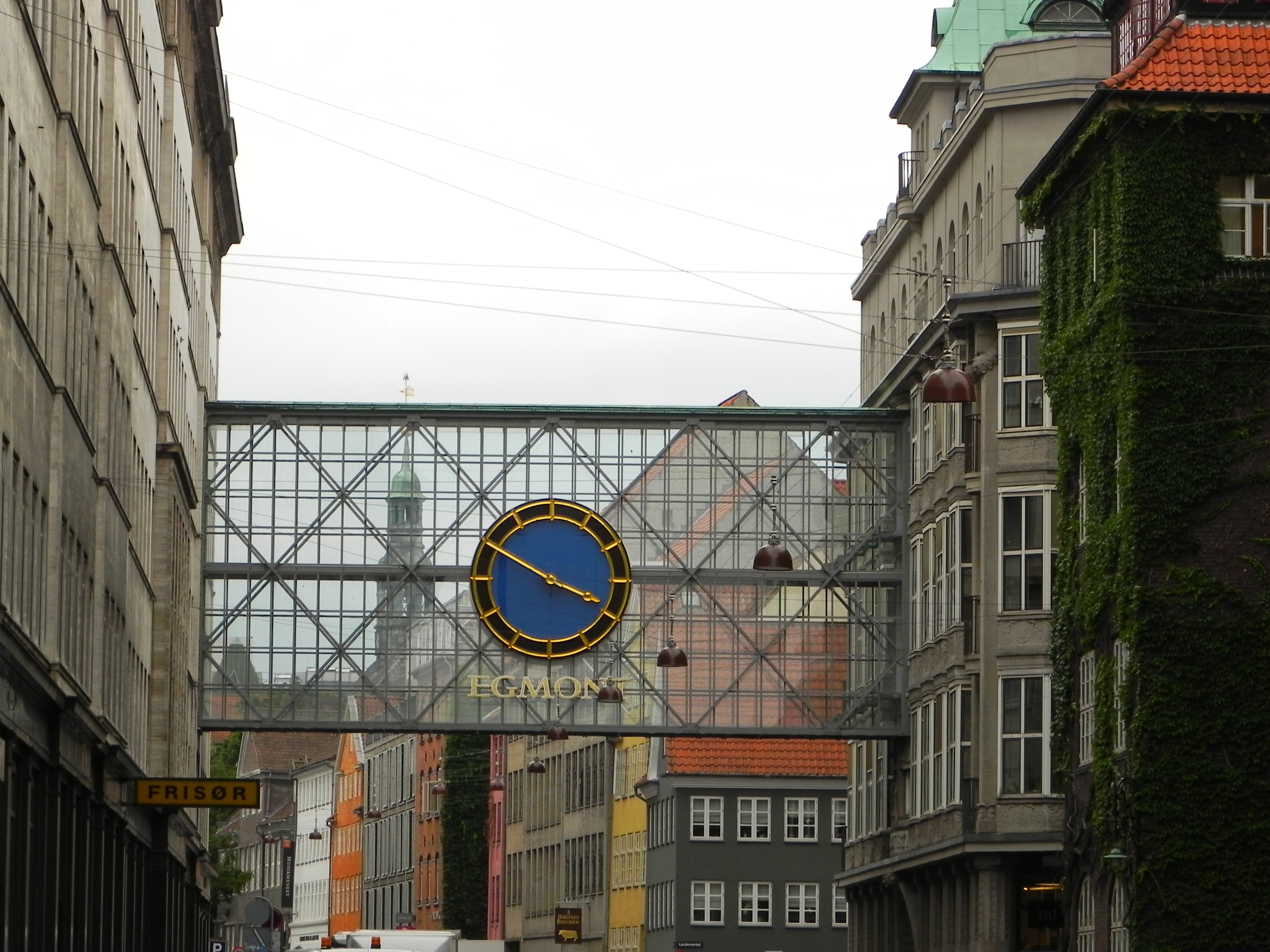
Egmont clock sign in Copenhagen (1935)

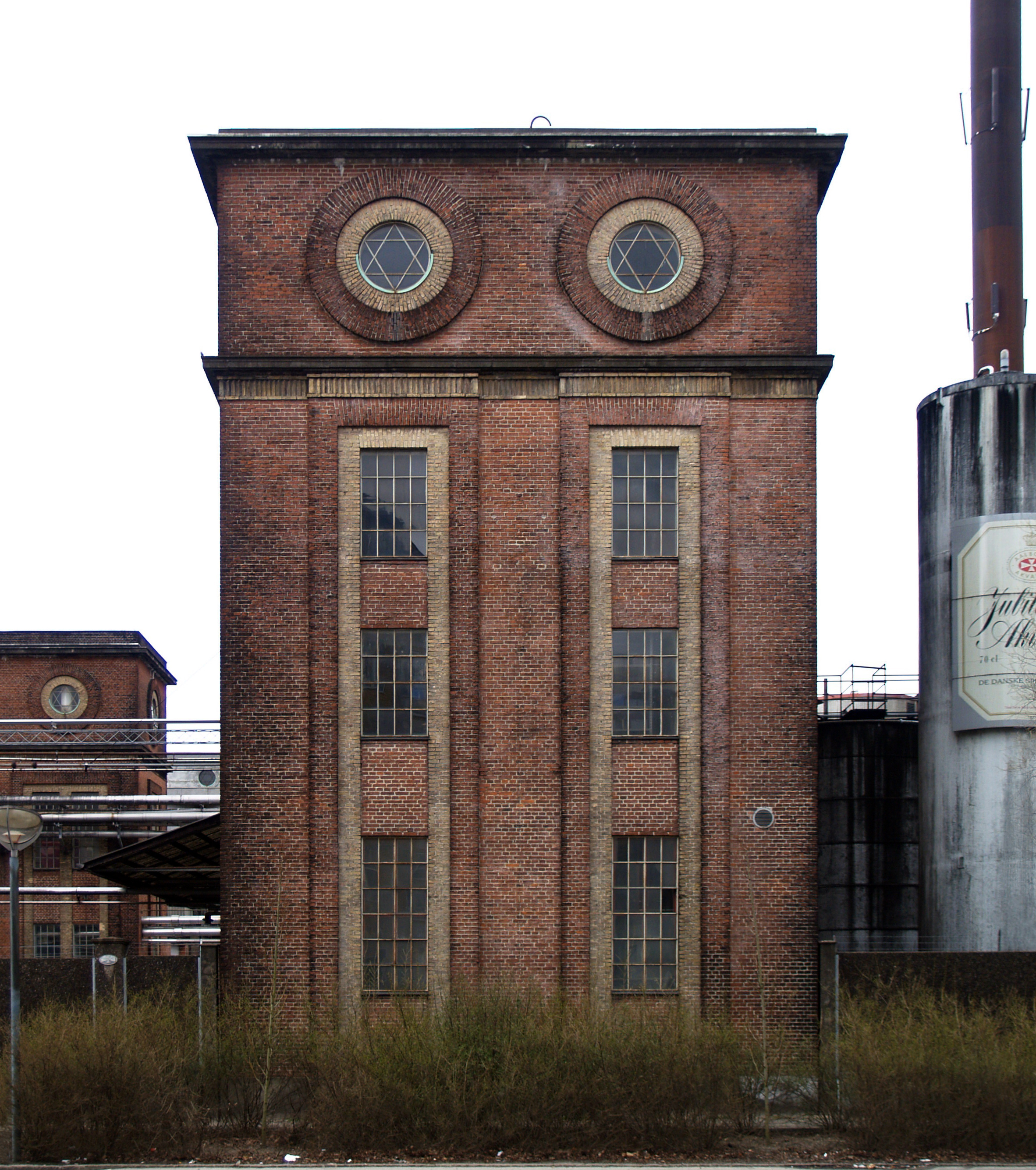
De Danske Spritfabrikker, Aalborg (1929–1931)

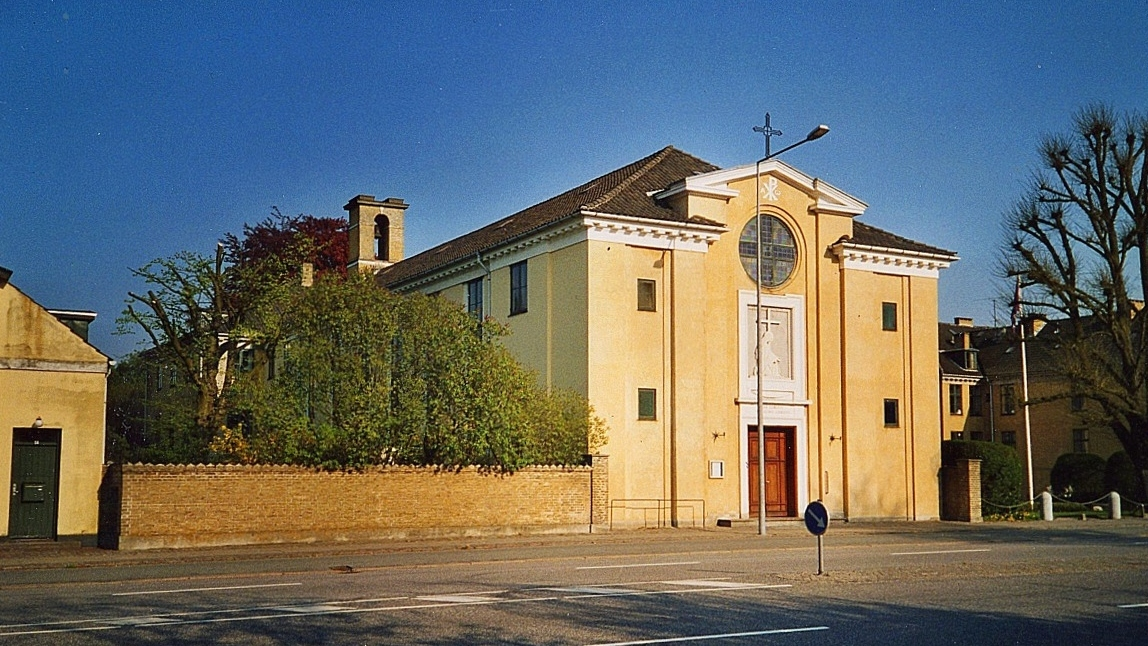
St. Theresa's Church, Hellerup (1935)

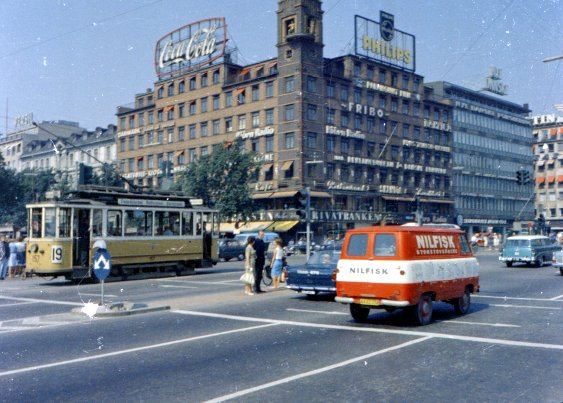
Richshuset, Copenhagen (1936)
