= St. Theresa's Church, Denmark =

St. Theresa's Church
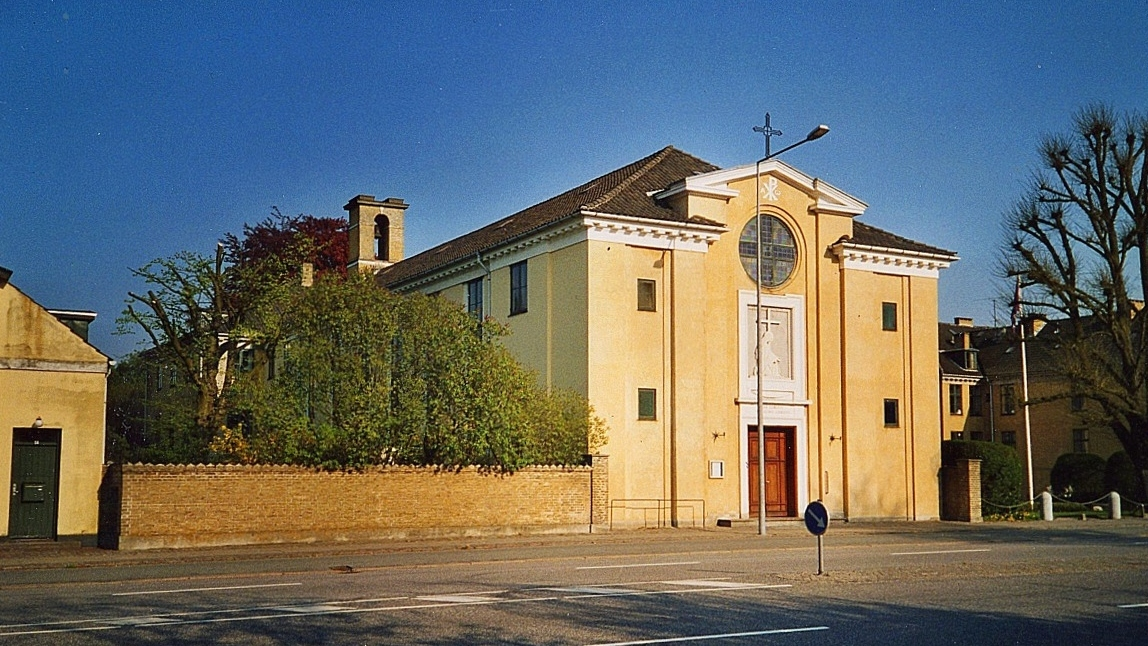
- St. Theresa's Church
- St. Theresa's Church
- 55°43′51″N 12°33′20″E
- Location: Hellerup, Gentofte Municipality
- Country: Denmark
- Denomination: Roman Catholic
- Website: Official website

History
- Status: Church
- Founded: 1935
- Dedication: Thérèse of Lisieux

Architecture
- Functional status: Active
- Architect: Alf Cock-Clausen

Administration
- Diocese: Copenhagen
- Parish: St. Theresa's Parish

St. Theresa's Church (Danish: Sankt Therese Kirke) is a Roman Catholic church located at Bernstorffsvej in Hellerup, Gentofte Municipality, Copenhagen, Denmark. It is part of a larger complex which also comprises Rygaards International School.

The congregation now has about 500 members above the age of 16 from 314 households.

== History ==
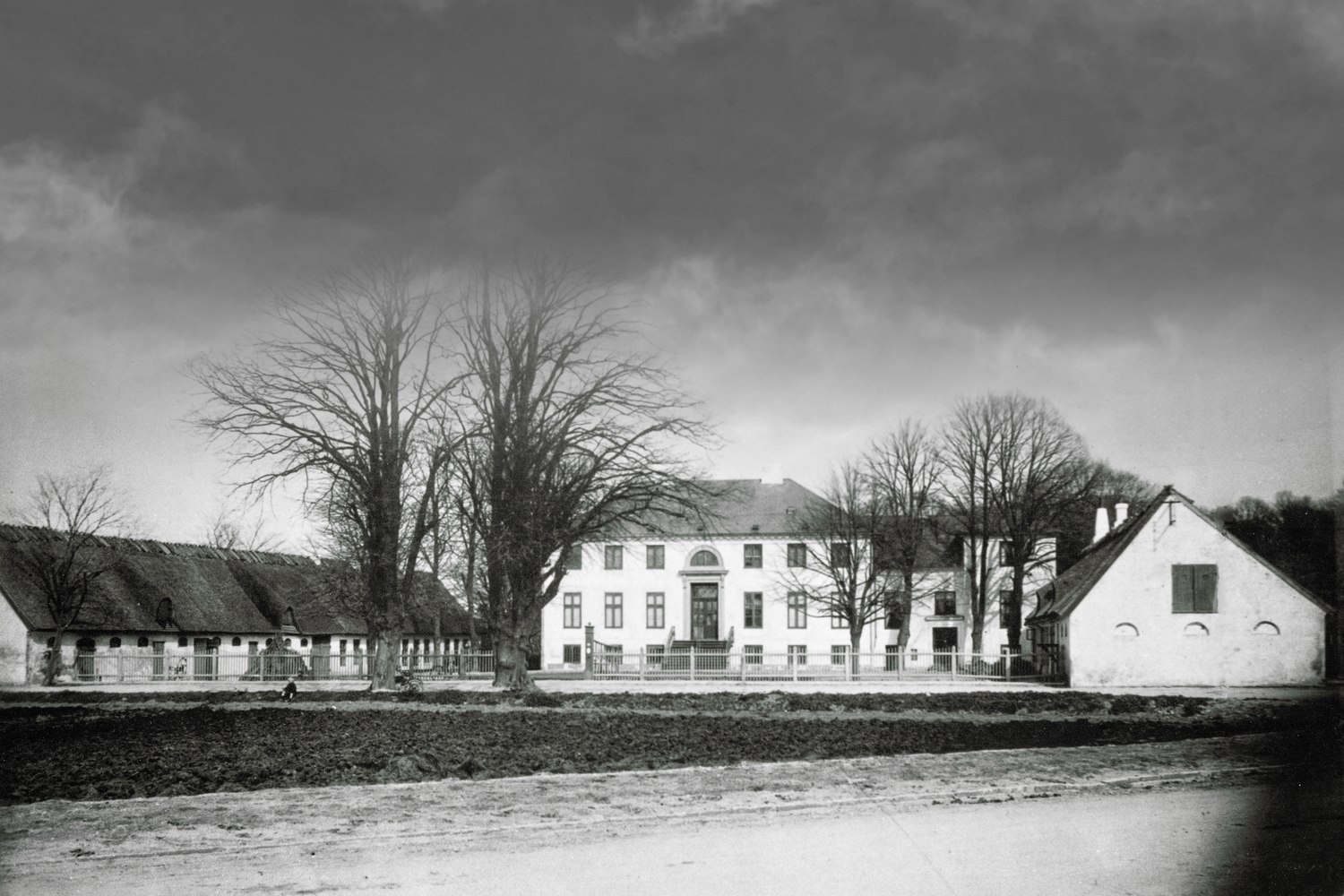
Rygaard before the changes

A group of Assumption Sisters came to Denmark in 1908. From 1909 to 1920 they were based at Amalievej 16 in Frederiksberg, and later at St. Andrew's College in Ordrup. In 1930 they acquired the property Rygaard on Bernstorffsvej in Hellerup. A chapel was installed in a room with high ceilings in the main wing. Mass was read on a daily basis from 13 August 1930. The plan was to replace the two side wings with a church and a residential wing but they were put on hold.

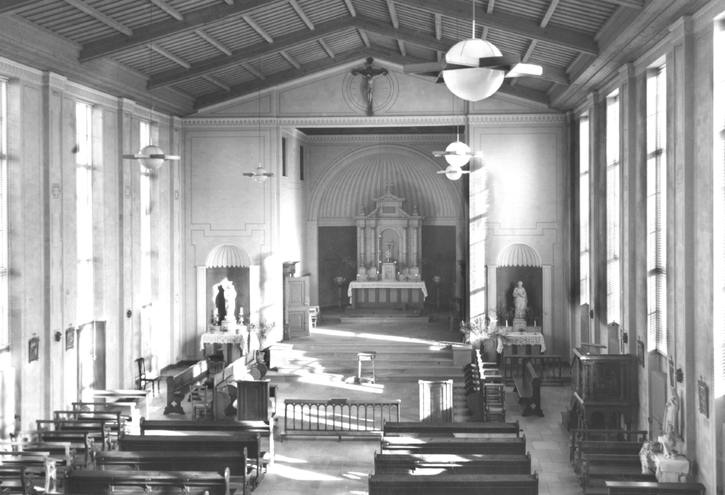
The interior of St. Theresa's Church

The plans for the construction of a church were revived when the Sisters celebrated the 25-year anniversary of their arrival in Denmark on 12 October 1933. It was announced that it would be dedicated to Thérèse of Lisieux as the first church in Scandinavia. The architect Alf Cock-Clausen was charged with the design of the new building. Construction began on 3 January 1935 and the foundation stone was set by Bishop Josef Brems on 9 March. The church was dedicated on 14 December 1935.

St. Theresa's Parish was erected from St. Andrew's Parish on 1 January 1942. A residence for the pastor was built in 1954. The congregation initially had 350 members.

The south wing was demolished and replaced by a new wing with class rooms, gymnastics hall and school kitchen in 1958–59.

In 1988 the Assumption Sisters announced that they would leave Rygaard. The following year it began sharing priests with St. Andrew's Parish, and in 2008 the parishes were formally merged again.

== Architecture ==
The church forms the north wing of the complex. It is 35 metre long, 12 metres wide and 10 metres tall. Above the main entrance is a relief by Aage Nielsen-Edwin depicting St. Theresa with the cross. It was added in 1936.

Six tall, rectangular windows are located on each side of the nave. The chancel is raised five steps.

== Furnishings ==
The baptismal font was formerly located in Hornbæk Church. It was a gift to Bishop Thorvald Suhr who gave it to the church. It was restored by the sculptor Axel Theilmann. The baptismal dish is made of brass. It was designed by the Benedictians at Jagtvej and executed by Cissellør Jetmar.

The pews were originally borrowed from the decommissioned Rosenkranskirke in Vesterbro. The current altar was installed in the early 1970s.

The first organ was purchased in 1944. The current organ comes from Högseröd Church in Sweden. It was installed by Frederiksborg Orgelbyggeri and inaugurated on 24 May 1979.

The church received a new statue of St. Theresa as a gift in 1952. It was carved in walnut tree by the sculptor Ejgil Vedel Smith. Another statue in the church depicts the Joseph and Mary with the infant Jesus.
