= Jeg vil bare gerne være et godt menneske, men det er ikke let =

2025 studio album by Benjamin Hav

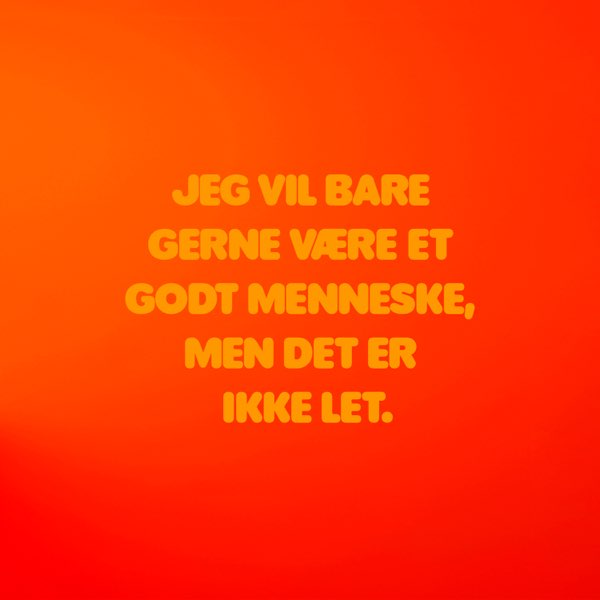

Studio album by Benjamin Hav
- Released: 31 January 2025
- Genre: Hip-hop
- Length: 35:44
- Label: Sony Music Denmark
- Producer: Emil Falk

Benjamin Hav chronology
Tesla (2021)	Jeg vil bare gerne være et godt menneske, men det er ikke let (2025)

Singles from Jeg vil bare gerne være et godt menneske, men det er ikke let
- 1. "Første dag" Released: 13 October 2023; 2. "Husk at vær' happy" Released: 14 June 2024; 3. "Du ligner din mor" Released: 27 December 2024

Jeg vil bare gerne være et godt menneske, men det er ikke let (transl. I just want to be a good person, but it's not easy) is the fourth studio album by Danish rapper and songwriter Benjamin Hav. It was released by Sony Music Denmark on 31 January 2025.

== Release and reception ==
After the album was initially teased in late 2024, Hav officially confirmed the album's release date in an interview with Euroman on 21 January 2025. The album was released on 31 January, containing 12 tracks. Several songs were released as singles prior to the album's launch, including "Du ligner din mor" featuring Lukas Graham, a song which reached number one on the Hitlisten charts.

Reviews of the album were mixed. Soundvenue writer Kjartan Stolberg was critical of the album, stating Hav had become a parody of himself, with the rapper's irony and humour getting in the way of revealing himself emotionally. Familien, a backing band who were a large part of the album's performances including "Kolding", did receive praise for their performance. Gaffa's reviewer had a similar negative review, giving the album two of six stars while calling it Hav's weakest album without any noteworthy hits. The magazine also touched on the irony and humour becoming "annoying" rather than entertaining.

Politiken reviewer Pernille Jensen gave the album a more favourable review, with four of six stars, characterising the album as an evolution rather than regression. Jyllands-Posten praised the album with four of six stars, commenting on Familien's performance leading the album to sound like a live performance rather than a studio album. Ralf Christensen, for Dagbladet Information, called the album "nonsense pop" while still giving the album an overall positive review.

While the album received mixed reviews, several songs from the album did achieve success, with "Første dag" featuring Ella Augusta reaching number 12 on the Hitlisten charts and achieving triple-platinum certification from IFPI Danmark. "Første dag" was later nominated for the Listener Hit (Danish: P3 Lytterhittet) at the 2024 P3 Guld, hosted by DR P3. The album peaked at number two on the Danish charts, achieving platinum certification.

== Accolades ==
Year	Award	Category	Recipient(s)	Result	Ref.
2024	P3 Guld	Listener Hit	"Første dag" (Benjamin Hav feat. Ella Augusta)	Nominated	

== Track listing ==
No.	Title	Lyrics	Producer(s)	Length
1.	"Bo og lis"	Benjamin Hav; Emil Falk	Falk	4:26
2.	"Du ska' med"	Hav; Falk	Falk	3:09
3.	"Jeg er jo ikke psykopat"	Hav; Falk; Birthe Neumann	Falk	0:49
4.	"Første dag" (featuring Ella Augusta)	Hav	Falk	3:13
5.	"Du ligner din mor" (featuring Lukas Graham)	Hav; Falk	Falk	3:06
6.	"Dream team"	Hav; Falk; Andreas Stigkær	Falk	3:23
7.	"Kolding" (featuring Familien)	Hav; Falk; Birk Nevel; Viggo Bandholm; Toben Jensen; Kristoffer Sjelberg; Bastian Sjelberg	Falk	2:42
8.	"Jeg har skudt en hund"	Hav; Falk; Neumann	Falk	3:03
9.	"Husk at vær' happy"	Hav; Falk	Falk	3:00
10.	"Jeg elsker dig"	Hav; Falk	Falk	3:07
11.	"Love tonight"	Hav; Falk	Falk	3:59
12.	"Farvel"	Hav; Falk	Falk	1:37
Total length:				35:44

== Charts ==
=== Weekly charts ===
Weekly chart performance
Chart (2025–2026)	Peak position
Danish Albums (Hitlisten)	2

=== Year-end charts ===
Year-end chart performance
Chart	Year	Position
Danish Albums (Hitlisten)	2025	14

== Certifications ==
Certifications
Region	Certification	Certified units/sales
Denmark (IFPI Danmark)	Platinum	20,000^{‡}
^{*} Sales figures based on certification alone.^{‡} Sales+streaming figures based on certification alone.
