= Pind (rapper) =

Danish rapper and producer (born 1996)

- Born: Frederik Pind Schmidt; 1996 (age 29–30); Herning, Denmark
- Genres: Hip-hop; rap
- Occupations: Rapper; record producer; songwriter
- Years active: 2018–present
- Labels: Sony Music Denmark; PIND.PROD.

Frederik Pind Schmidt (born 1996), better known mononymously as Pind, is a Danish rapper, record producer, and songwriter. He has released one studio album and two EPs, with his debut EP achieving gold certification from IFPI Danmark. "Plastic" featuring Benjamin Hav, achieved platinum certification and became Pind's most successful single.

== Early life ==
Born in Herning in 1996, Pind grew up in the Vesterhede neighborhood in Ringkøbing, a town on the west coast of Jutland. He grew up playing football until his early teenage years, playing for the youth teams of Rindum SU and Ringkøbing IF. He was later dropped from Ringkøbing's team due to smoking cigarettes. Around the same time as he lost interest in playing football, he became interested in music when a friend introduced him to FL Studio, after which he spent several years learning to make beats and techno.

Pind has also discussed his childhood had numerous occasions of pulling "a few too many pranks", which included acts of vandalism and fighting which led to police encounters. He described his experiences as both traumatic and formative. After finishing his education from Ringkøbing Handelsskole, he began work at a clothing store in Copenhagen his interest in music continued to grow and later led to him moving back to Jutland.

== Career ==
Pind began making music as a teenager, attempting to reach out to artists in other countries by sending them beats, before instead focusing on making music for himself. After making five songs, which would later become his first EP, he reached out to a contact at Sony Music Denmark who was looking for a DJ at the time. Within a short time, Pind had signed a record deal with Sony Music Denmark. He made his music debut with the release of the single "Torpedo" on 7 December 2018. Several days later, he made his live performance debut at Lille Vega in Copenhagen while his debut song was receiving praise across Danish media outlets. The song was streamed over 70,000 times on Spotify in its first three months of release. His second single, "Indlæg", went on to achieve gold certification from IFPI Danmark.

Pind released his debut EP on 15 November 2019, entitled Videre. A song from the album, "Plastic" featuring fellow Danish rapper Benjamin Hav, became one of his most successful songs. The song was met with high praise from DR P3's Pelle Peter, who stated the song was "a fairly unique sound that makes you listen an extra time". The song eventually became Pind's first platinum certification. The song's success led to Pind being nominated for The Voice Awards's top prize, though he ultimately did not win.

Pind released his debut studio album, Lotus, on 1 April 2022. The music video for "Avalon", the lead single from the album, was filmed during the later months of 2019 in Ringkøbing, with Pind stated that filming a music video in the town was important to him, wanting to showcase where he grew up. Additional scenes from the music video were filmed in Skjern. Lotus went on to reach number 29 on the Danish top 40 charts, though was met with mixed reviews. By 2025, he had left Sony Music and was without a major label. He self-released his EP, Menneskelige Tendenser, in November 2025 after working in his own studio in Aarhus.

== Discography ==
=== Studio albums ===
Title	Details	Peak chart positions
Title	Details	DEN
Lotus	Released: 1 April 2022; Label: Sony Music Denmark	29

=== Extended plays ===
Title	Details	Certifications
Videre	Released: 15 November 2019; Label: Sony Music Denmark	IFPI DEN: Gold
Menneskelige tendenser	Released: 14 November 2025; Label: PIND.PROD.	

=== Singles ===
Title	Year	Certifications	Album
"Torpedo"	2018		Non-album singles
"Indlæg"	2019	IFPI DEN: Gold	Non-album singles
"Eventyr"	2019		Non-album singles
"Plastic" (featuring Benjamin Hav)	2019	IFPI DEN: Platinum	Videre
"Jeg Har Glemt" (featuring Josva)	2020		Non-album single
"Avalon"	2021		Lotus
"DISCO FOMO"	2023		Non-album singles
"Ups"	2024		Non-album singles
"Din Sang"	2024		Non-album singles
"Sådan nogen som os" (featuring Martin Johannes Larsen)	2025		Non-album singles
"Fri mand"	2025		Menneskelige Tendenser

== Award nominations ==
Year	Award	Category	Recipient(s)	Result	Ref.
2020	The Voice Awards	The Prize	Pind	Nominated	
