= Ella Augusta =

Danish singer (born 2005)

- Born: Ella Augusta Drori Mikkelsen; 7 May 2006 (age 20)
- Origin: Denmark
- Genre: Pop
- Occupation: Singer
- Years active: 2022–present
- Label: The Bank Records

Ella Augusta Drori Mikkelsen (born 7 May 2006) is a Danish singer. Releasing one studio album and one extended play, she has been nominated for several awards in her native Denmark, including New Danish Name of the Year from the Danish Music Awards.

== Career ==
Augusta was born in Denmark. Her father is a singer and songwriter, performing under the name Erann DD, and her mother is a fashion designer. She is the youngest of three children. She became interested in music at a young age, appearing in a Christmas show at her school in grade 7. Singing in the wrong tone, she was upset with her own performance and, taking it as an opportunity to improve, she created an Instagram account where she uploaded her first song. The song was later discovered by a producer, who helped her sign to a record label. In December 2022, she released her first single, "Når solen skinner (Fra græsner)".

Augusta's first song in 2023 was released on 21 April, a feature on the song "Jeg vil have dig helt" by Lord Siva. On 13 October 2023, Benjamin Hav released his song "Første dag", which featured Augusta on accompanying vocals. The song soon became DR P3's "Inevitable", the song of the week. Reaching number 11 on the Danish top 40 chart, it saw the duo nominated for Listener Hit at the 2024 P3 Guld awards show. Augusta was also named for a solo award during the award show, however she would leave the show without winning either nomination. The song went on to achieve triple-platinum certification by IFPI Danmark in September 2026.

Augusta released her first extended play on 3 May 2024, which received positive reviews from music critics. The album reached number 17 on the Danish chart and achieved gold certification. She released a set of live songs to her YouTube in August 2024 following the end of a series of music festivals. By the end of 2024, Augusta was nominated for the New Danish Name of the Year award from the Danish Music Awards.

On 8 August 2026, Augusta announced her debut album, Lilla. The album was released on 14 August 2026.

=== Live performances ===
Augusta began performing to larger audiences in 2024, including accompanying Pil in February. Augusta and Benjamin Hav also performed their song "Første dag" together during the series finale of X Factor in April 2024. Augusta began a touring festivals in Denmark in 2024, playing at SPOT, Roskilde, and Smukfest.

== Discography ==
=== Studio albums ===
Title	Details	Peak chart positions
Title	Details	DEN
Lilla	Release date: 14 August 2026; Label: The Bank Records	25

=== Extended plays ===
Title	Details	Peak chart positions	Certifications
Title	Details	DEN	Certifications
Sytten	Released: 3 May 2024; Label: The Bank Records	17	IFPI DEN: Gold

=== Singles ===
Title	Year	Peak chart positions	Certifications	Album
Title	Year	DEN	Certifications	Album
"Når solen skinner (fra Græsner)"	2022	—		Non-album single
"Jeg vil have dig helt" (Lord Siva featuring Ella Augusta)	2023	—		8 Dage I April
"Første dag" (Benjamin Hav featuring Ella Augusta)	2023	11	IFPI DEN: 3× Platinum	Jeg vil bare gerne være et godt menneske, men det er ikke let
"Baglæns"	2024	24	IFPI DEN: Platinum	Sytten
"Uendelighed"	2025	—		Lilla
"Bedre held næste gang" (with Ida Laurberg)	2025	—		Lilla
"Prøveperiode"	2026	—		Lilla
"En mildest talt elendig samtale" (with Chris Burton)	2026	—		Lilla
"Tættere på hende" (featuring Pil)	2026	—		Lilla
"—" denotes a recording that did not chart or was not released in that territory.

== Awards and nominations ==
Year	Award	Category	Recipient(s)	Result	Ref.
2024	Danish Music Awards	New Danish Name of the Year	Augusta	Nominated	
2024	P3 Guld	The Talent	Augusta	Nominated	
2024	P3 Guld	Listener Hit	"Første dag" (Benjamin Hav feat. Ella Augusta)	Nominated	
