= Øregård Gymnasium =

Public gymnasium school in Copenhagen

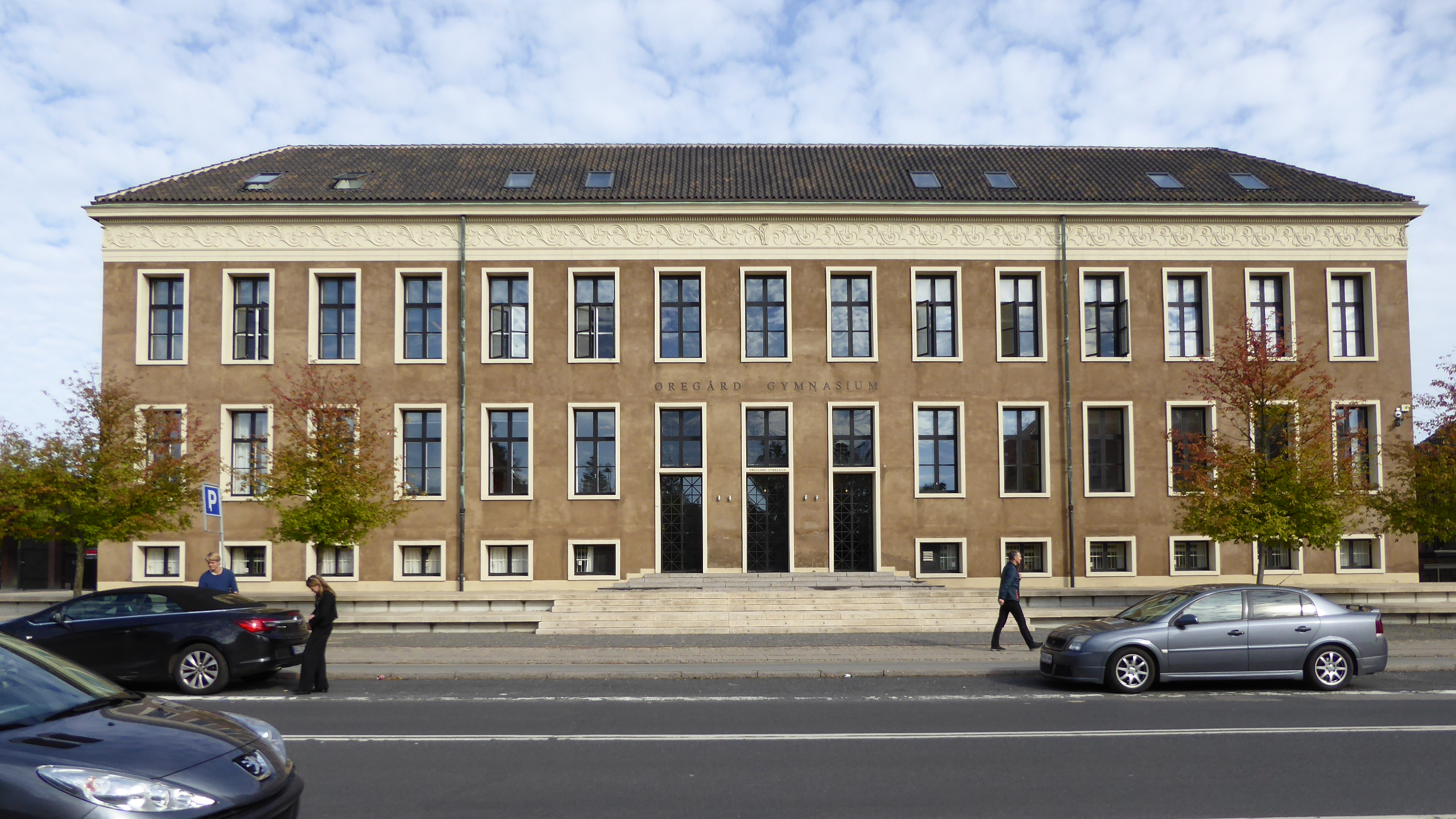

Location
- Gentofte Municipality, Copenhagen, Denmark
- Coordinates: 55.7380°N 12.5669°E

Information
- Type: Public gymnasium
- Founded: 1903
- Principal: Pia Nyring
- Enrollment: 726
- Website: www.oregard.dk

The Øregård Gymnasium is a gymnasium in the Hellerup district of Gentofte Municipality in the northern suburbs of Copenhagen, Denmark. The neoclassical main building from 1924 is listed.

== History ==
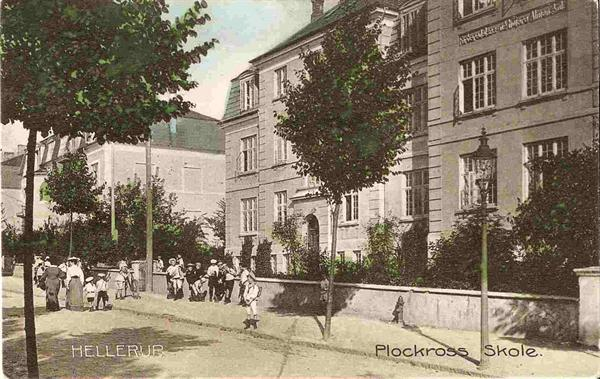
Plockross' School in 1908

Øregård Gymnasium was founded in 1903 by V. Plockross under the name Plockross' Skole. The building was located at Duntzfelts Allé 8. It received its current name when Gentofte Municipality took over the school in 1919. The current main building on Gersonsvej was inaugurated in 1924. It was designed by G. B. Hagen and Edvard Thomsen. Gehrdt Bornebusch undertook a renovation of the building in 1977–80. The building was listed in 1995.

== Principals ==
- 1903-1910: V. Plockross
- 1910-1912: Paul Branth
- 1912-1927: Jens M. Krarup
- 1927-1950: Herluf Møller
- 1950-1972: Paul Rubinstein
- 1972-1986: Tage Bülow-Hansen
- 1986-2000: Lis Holck
- 2001- : Pia Nyring

== Notable students ==
- 1924: Aksel Schiøtz, tenor
- 1930: Mærsk Mc-Kinney Møller, businessman
- 1958: Gregers Algreen-Ussing, architect
- 1985: Thomas Rathsack, former member of jægerkorpset and author
- 1986: Frederik X, King of Denmark
- 1986: Prince Joachim of Denmark
- 1987: Lykke Friis, politician
- (2026): Isabella of Denmark, princess
