= Bernstorffsvej =

Street in Gentofte, Copenhagen, Denmark

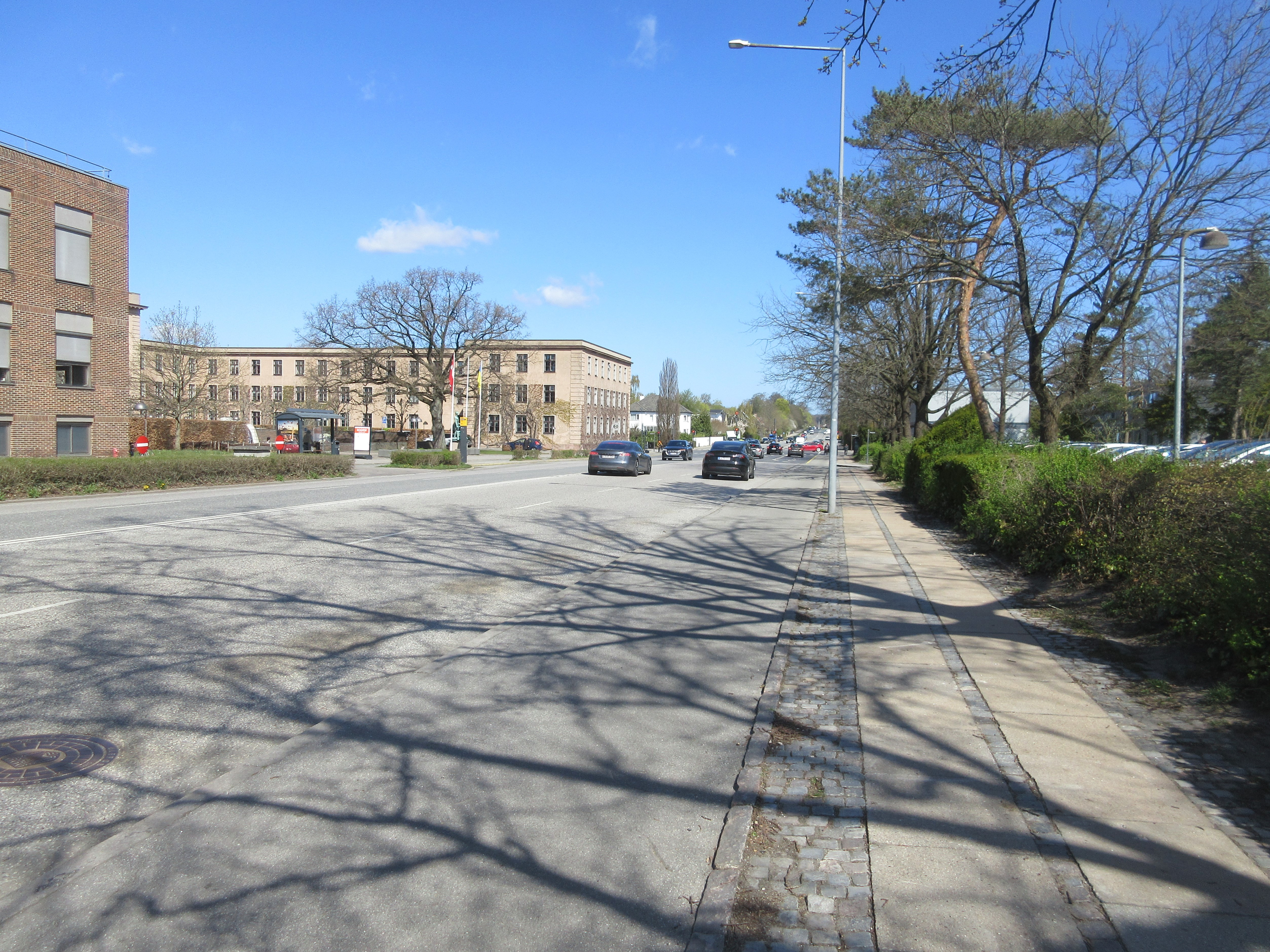
- Bernstorffsvej with Gentofte Yown Hall to the left.
- Interactive map of Bernstorffsvej
- Length: 3,800 m (12,500 ft)
- Location: Gentofte Municipality, Copenhagen, Denmark
- Quarter: Gentofte
- Postal code: Bernstorffsvej station
- Coordinates: 55°44′35.7″N 12°33′24.22″E
- South end: Lyngbyvej
- Major junctions: Tuborgvej
- North end: Jægersborg Allé

Construction
- Completion: 1770

Bernstorffsvej is a major road in the Gentofte Municipality, located in the northern suburbs of Copenhagen, Denmark. It runs from Lyngby to a five-way roundabout on Jægersborg Allé in the north. The road passes several notable Danish buildings, including Gentofte Town Hall, Helleruplund Church, the Roman Catholic, St. Theresa's Church, Hellerup Cemetery and Bernstorff Park.

== History ==
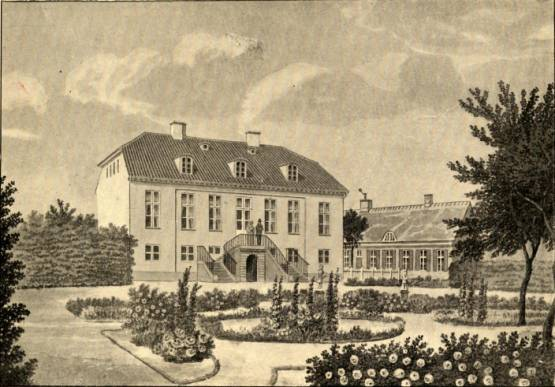
Rygaard painted by Heinrich Gustav Ferdinand Holm in c. 1840

In 1752, the pheasantry at Jægersborg was given to Count Johann Hartwig Ernst von Bernstorff from the King. Bernstorff Palace was later completed by him in 1765. Jean Marmillod, a French engineer, was called to Denmark by Bernstorff to improve the road systems around Copenhagen. Marmillod thus became responsible for the construction of Bernstorffsvej, which he completed in 1770. The road was built to link the Royal Frederiksborg Road with Bernstorff Palace and Jægersborg Allé. Unlike Jægersborg Allé at its northern end, which was only opened for the members of the court and not opened to the public until 1829, Bermstorffsvej was open to the public and created in 1770. The junction where the two roads met, known as Femvejen (The Five-Way), was initially used by royal hunting parties in connection with par force hunting.

== Notable Buildings and Residents ==
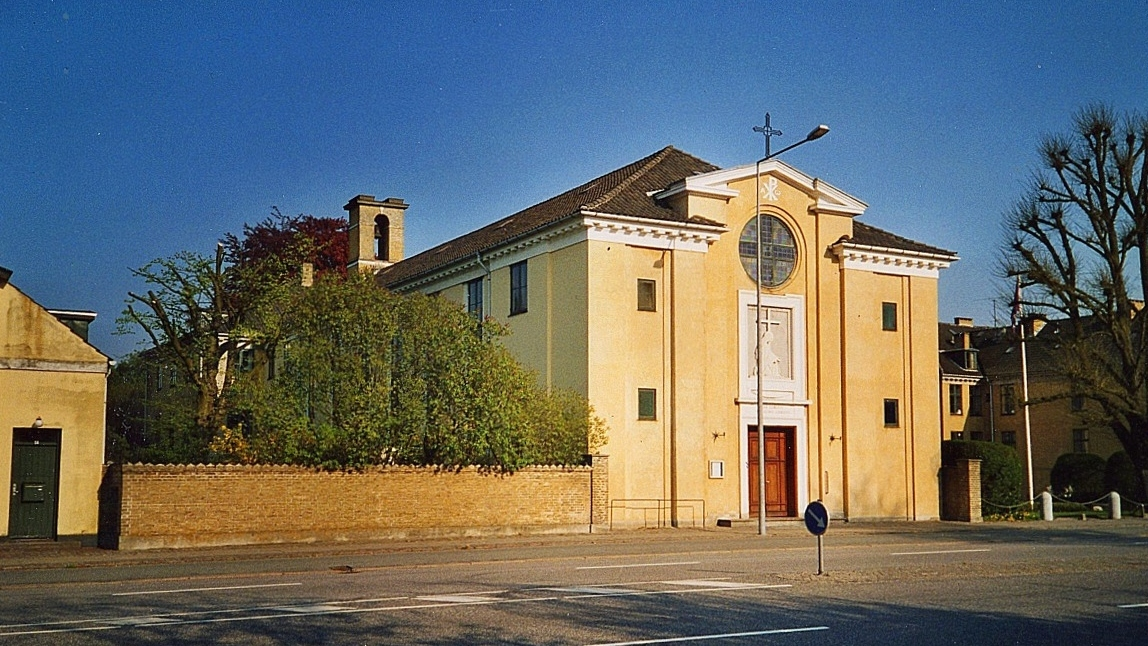
St. Theresa's Church

In the late 18th and 19th century, along with the road that originated in the old farms, several of the properties were converted into country houses. One such property, Rygaard, was acquired by a Roman Catholic school in 1930, which is now known as Rygaards International School. The old main wing, designed by Vilhelm Tvede, dates back to 1886. The north wing was replaced by St. Theresa's Church (No. 56) in 1930. The church was designed by Alf Cock-Clausen, who also replaced Rygaard's south wing with a new building, containing classrooms for the school.

Helleruplund (No. 98) is another old country house. The property was called Nordre Svejgård until 1875. The current building, designed by H.P. Ditlefsen, dates back to 1891. Another surviving country house is Heslegård (No. 95), which was owned by the Minister of Financial Affairs Wilhelm Sponneck from 1866 to 1883. The current buildings date back to 1920 and were designed by the architects Therkel Hjejle and Niels Rosenkjær.

Sankt Lukas Stiftelsen (No. 20) was constructed in 1929–31 and was designed by Valdemar Birkmand and Aage Rafn.

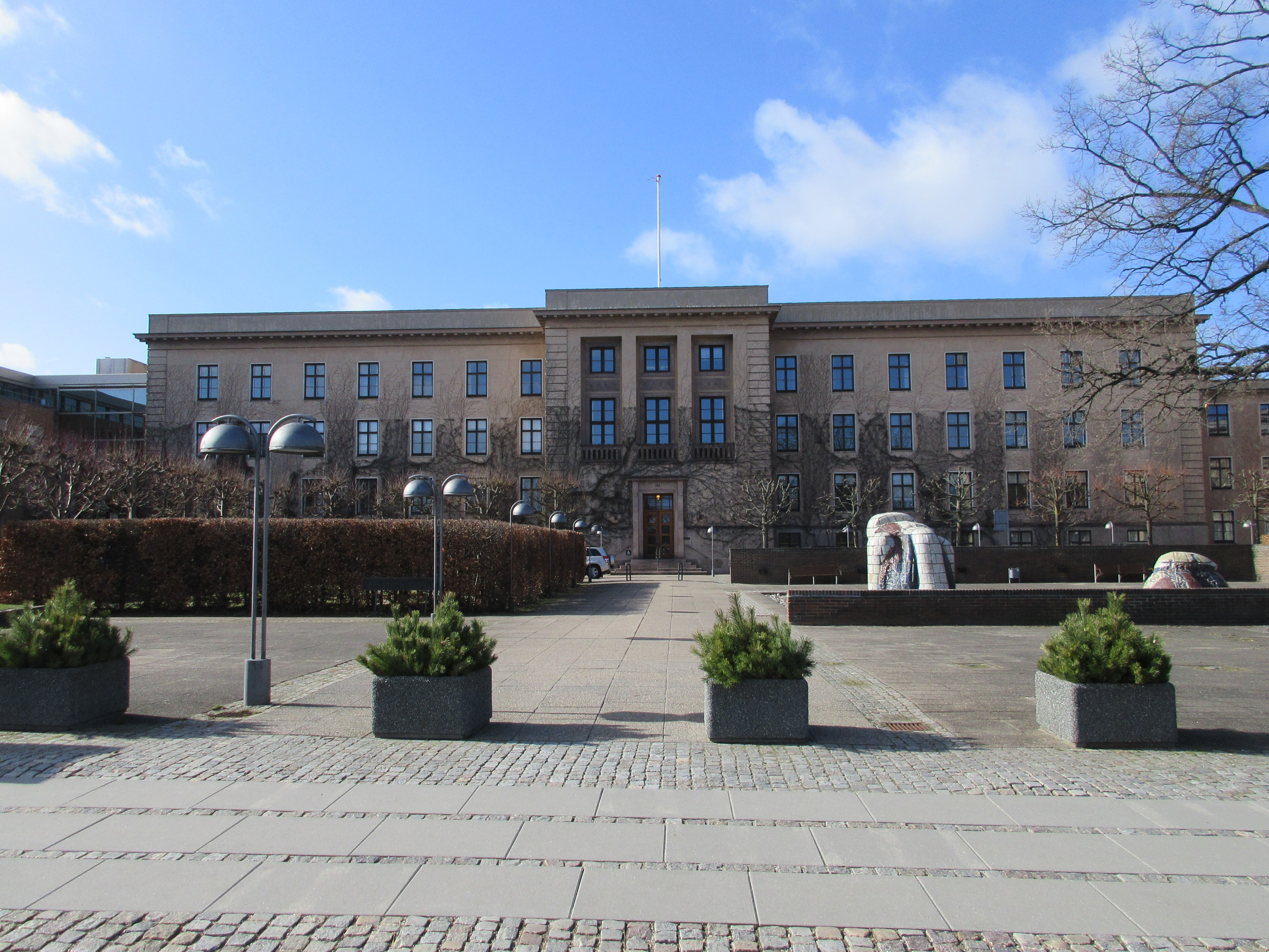
Gentofte Town Hall.

Gentofte Town Hall (No. 159) was constructed in 1934–36 and was designed by Thorvald Jørgensen. The Gentofte Fire Station, built in 1938, is next to it. It was designed by Thorvald Jørgensen in collaboration with Kai Rasmussen.

Helleruplund Church (No. 73) is a Church of Denmark parish church. It is from 1955 to 1956 and was designed by Arthur Wittmaack and Vilhelm Hvalsøe.

The house at No. 17, which was made in 1931, was built as a test house for Dansk Cement Central by the architect Frits Schlegel. The house at No. 27 was built for count Christian Albrecht Frederik Lerche-Lerchenborg by Tyge Hvass in 1938. The two Modernist houses at No. 93B-C, were built by Vilhelm Lauritzen from 1956 to 1957, for him and his family.

== Public art ==
In front of Gentofte Town Hall, there is a group of sculptures called "The Freedom Monument," designed by Axel Poulsen in 1954. Next to it is a water feature from 1978 by Allan Schmidt, featuring an abstract sculpture with two organic figures. The sculpture was created in collaboration with Royal Copenhagen, consisting of circa 500 glazed ceramic tiles in white, blue, and reddish-brown colors.

== Park and green spaces ==
Bernstorff Park is located at the northern end of the street. Gellerup Cemetery is located next to Helleruplund Church.

== Transport ==
Bernstorffsvej Station (No. 145) is a station of the Hillerød radial of the S-train network.
