= Steen Hildebrandt =

Steen Hildebrandt (born in 1944) is a Danish academic and author on business, organizational theory and management. He is Professor Emeritus of Management Studies at Aarhus School of Business, University of Aarhus and an associated professor at Copenhagen Business School.

== Other pursuits ==
In 2004 he founded the management consultancy firm Hildebrandt & Brandi in collaboration with Søren Brandi. He was chairman of Sankt Lukas Stiftelsen in 2007–2008.

== Personal life ==
Hildebrandt is married and lives in the Frederiksberg district of Copenhagen. He has two grown-up children.

== Bibliography in English ==
- 1998 The learning organisations: Experiences from Danish enterprises. (with Søren Brandi) Original title in Danish: Lærende organisationer. Erfaringer fra danske virksomheder.
- 2001 Gold through competence. (Steen Hildebrandt and Søren Brandi (ed.) Original title in Danish: Kompetenceguldet.
- 2003 Management by use of diversity. (with Søren Brandi) Original title in Danish: Mangfoldighedsledelse.
- 2005 Managing the changes. (with Søren Brandi) Original title in Danish: Ledelse af forandring.
