= List of churches in Gladsaxe Municipality =

This is a list of churches in Gladsaxe Municipality, Greater Copenhagen, Denmark.

== Church of Denmark ==
Name	Location	Year	Coordinates	Image	Refs
Bagsværd Church	Bagsværd	1976	55°45′42.46″N 12°26′40.21″E		
Buddinge Church	Buddinge	1968	55°44′39.2″N 12°29′41.7″E		
Gladsaxe Church	Gladsaxe	c. 1180	55°22′22.19″N 12°28′21.71″E		
Harald'sChurch	Søborg	1967	55°43′44.76″N 12°29′53.52″E		
Mørkhøj Church	Mørkhøj	1960	55°43′27″N 12°28′15″E		
Stengård Church	Bagsværd	1962	55°45′23.03″N 12°28′34.17″E		
Søborg Church	Søborg	1914	55°44′6.5″N 12°30′43″E		
Søborgmagle Church	Søborg	1968	55°43′23.16″N 12°34′34.92″E		

== See also ==
- List of churches in Gentofte Municipality
