= Carl Gunnar Feilberg =

Danish geographer, ethnographer and explorer (1894–1972)

- Born: October 22, 1894; Copenhagen, Denmark
- Died: January 6, 1972 (aged 77); Hellerup, Denmark
- Occupations: Travel writer, Explorer, Ethnographer
- Spouse: Martha Siegumfeldt
- Children: one son
- Writing career
- Pen name: C. G. Feilberg
- Genres: Travel writing, Enthography, Exploration
- Notable work: La Tente Noire

Carl Gunnar Feilberg (October 22, 1894 – January 6, 1972) was a Danish geographer, ethnographer and explorer of Asia. He was a professor of human geography at the University of Copenhagen, known for his ethnographic fieldwork among the Lur pastoralists in Luristan, Iran. His research focused on nomadism and material culture, particularly the structure and distribution of black tents. Feilberg collected extensive ethnographic materials, now housed in the National Museum of Denmark and Moesgaard Museum. His major works include La Tente Noire (1944) and Les Papis (1952).

== Life ==
Feilberg was born in Copenhagen, Denmark on October 22, 1894. His father was Henning Frederik Feilberg (1865 - 1940) and his mother Anny Caroline Louise Olsen (1867 - 1934). His paternal grandfather was the pastor and folklorist Henning Frederik Feilberg. He graduated from the Østersøgades Gymnasium, Copenhagen in 1912. He attended the University of Copenhagen and in 1919 he was awarded a Master of Theology (Candidatus theologiæ) with excellence for the university's historical prize essay. He married Martha Siegumfeldt and they had a son Anders F S Feilberg. He died in Hellerup in Denmark on January 6, 1972.

== Work ==
Feilberg was appointed to the Chair of Human Geography at University of Copenhagen in 1949. By the help of the Danish company, Kampsax, Feilberg travelled in 1935 to Iran, where he carried out ethnographical fieldwork in Bala Geriveh among the Papi tribe in Southern Luristan in Iran from the end of March to the end of July. Feilberg, who carried out fieldwork among the Lur pastoralists, dealt with the history of nomadism through an intricate analysis of the structure and distribution of the black tent (La tente Noire, Copenhagen, 1944). During his stay in the district of Luristan in Iran he gathered the huge number of material cultures of the nomads of Luristan and gave them to the National Museum of Denmark. Feilberg, funded by the Carlsberg Foundation, stayed with KAMPSAX engineers (in Bala Gariveh, southern Luristan) who had been contracted during the mid-1930s to build the Trans-Iranian railway. He made collections of ethnographic materials and took many pictures of people, working and relaxing; of tents and winter dwellings; of tools, rugs, carpets, and other domestic equipment; of animals; and of weddings and musical instruments. The photographs and collections are curated at the Danish National Museum (Copenhagen) and at the Prehistoric Museum (Moesgaard).

== Publications ==
- "Bidrag til de afrikanske Agerbrugsredskabers Kulturhistorie. Nogle Hakketyper i Belgisk Congo." (Geografisk Tidsskrift, Bind 37; 1934)
- La Tente Noire: Contribution Ethnographique à l'Histoire Culturelle des Nomades. Published 1944 by [Impr. par B. Lunos Bogtr.] in Kobenhavn.
- Les Papis: Tribu Persane de Nomades Montagnards du Sudouest de l'Iran. Published 1952 by I kommission hos Gyldendal in København .
- Afrika. En Verdensdel lukker sig op.Det Danske Forlag, København 1945.
- Hovedlinier i vor tids kulturgeografi by Carl Gunnar Feilberg (1963)

== General references ==
- Concise Biographical Companion to Index Islamicus, Volume 1 Bio-Bibliographical Supplement to Index Islamicus, 1665-1980, Volume One. A-G:
