= Helleruplund Church =

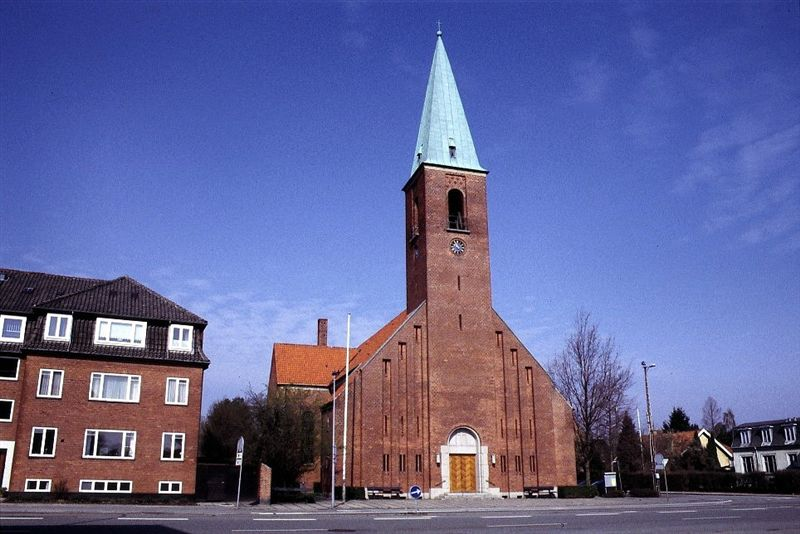
- Helleruplund Church
- 55.736278°N 12.555278°E
- Location: Bernstorffsvej 73; 8000 Hellerup
- Country: Denmark
- Denomination: Protestant Church

History
- Status: Church

Architecture
- Architect(s): Arthur Wittmaack; Vilhelm Hvalsøe
- Completed: 1956

Specifications
- Materials: Brick

Helleruplund Church (Danish: Helleruplund Kirke) is a Church of Denmark parish church situated at Bernstorffsvej 73 in Hellerup. Gentofte Municipality, Greater Copenhagen, Denmark. With just over 600 seats, it is the second largest church in the Diocese of Helsingør.

== History ==
A new church in the Bernstorffsvej area was first proposed in 1940. A committee was put in charge of realizing the project in 1942. A site was also acquired. The chair of the committee was the chaplain from Hellerup Church, Nørup-Nielsen, who would later become the first pastor of Helleruplund Church. He was the one who proposed the name with a reference to the property at Bernstorffsvej 98.

The construction of the church was delayed by World War II and the shortage of building materials that followed after the liberation. Helleruplund Parish was disjoined from those of Hellerup, Dyssegård and Gentofte in 1949. A temporary church was also inaugurated in a wooden building which had been acquired from the Knivholdt Camp at Frederikshavn, dismantled and rebuilt at Bernstorffsvej.

In the early 1950s the plans for a permanent church was finally revived. The church was designed by Arthur Wittmaack and Vilhelm Hvalsøe. The foundation stone was set on 11 Kune 1966 by church minister Bodil Koch and it was inaugurated in December 1956. The temporary church was used as a parish hall until a new one was built.

== Architecture ==
The church is built in red brick and stands on a base of granite. It has a cruciform layout and a canted chancel. The tower stands 42 m tall and has a copper-clad spire sloping shoulders. Its clock was a gift from Superfoss-CEO Vonsild. The church bells were donated by A.P. Møller og hustru Chastine Mc-Kinney Møllers Fond. The main entrance, with a granite portal, is set under a carved cross in the bottom of the tower. The four glass paintings in the chancel were created by Poul-Henrik Jensen In 1959 and 1966.
