= Pede B =

Danish rapper (born 1984)

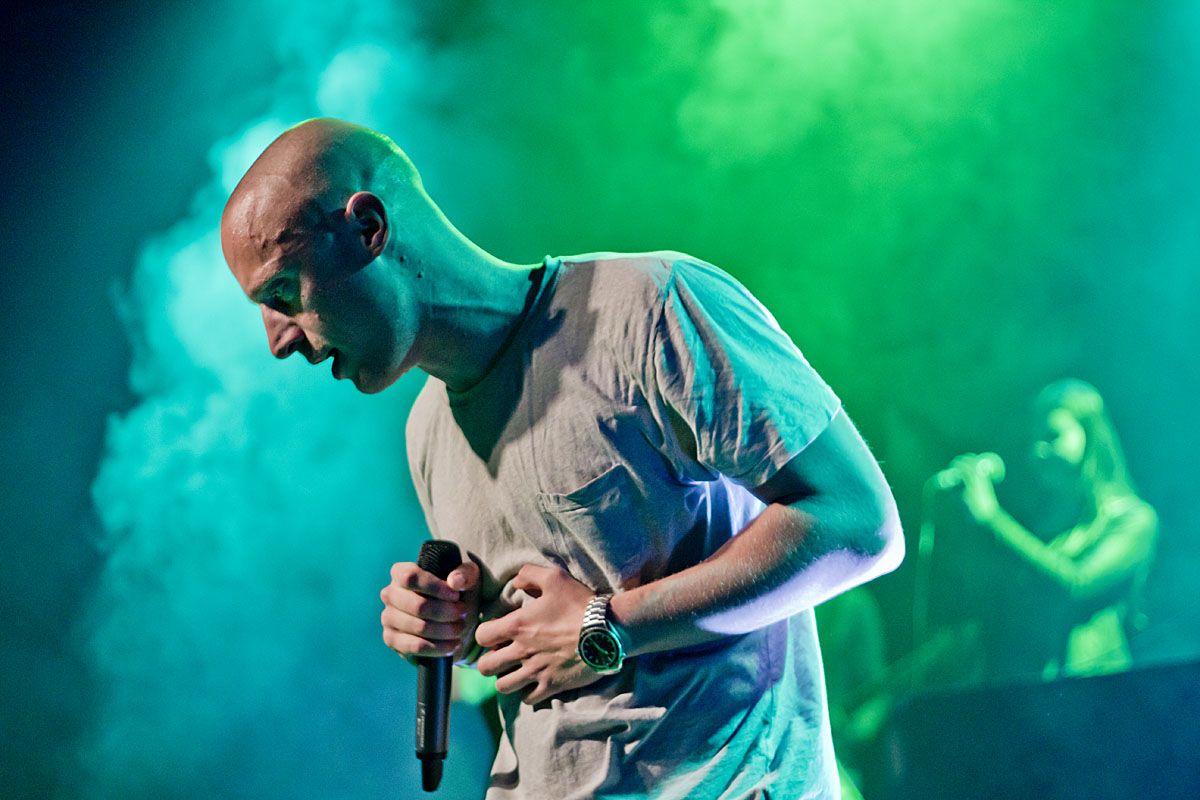
Pede B in 2012

Peter Ankjær Bigaard, better known by his stage name Pede B (born in 1984), is a Danish rapper originating from Hellerup. Starting rapping at a young age, he took part in MC's Fight Night, winning the title three times in 2005, 2007 and 2009, becoming the only rapper to score a hat-trick of victories in the competition's history. He has cooperated with many rappers, and with his album Over Askeskyen very notably with DJ Noize. The album reached number 3 on Hitlisten, the official Danish Albums Chart.

== Discography ==
=== Albums ===
Year	Album	Peak positions	Certification
Year	Album	DEN	Certification
2005	Et barn af tiderne	–	
2008	Stadig beskidt	23	
2010	Jungleloven	–	
2012	Over Askeskyen	3	
2013	Over Askeskyen 2	18	
2015	Byggesten	7	
2016	Gin & Cocio	21	
2017	Sparring	11	
2018	Over Askeskyen 3	34	
2020	Gøgeungen	34	
2021	Gumbo (with Tue Track)	32	

Mixtape

- 2009: B-Mennesket - The Mixtape
- 2010: Skarpe Skud Part 1 - Startskuddet
- 2010: Skarpe Skud Part 2 - Barneleg
- 2011: Skarpe Skud Part 3 - Løb Mens Du Kan
- 2012: Skarpe Skud Part 4 - Jorden Er Giftig
- 2013: Skarpe Skud Part 5 - En Chance Til

=== Singles ===
- 2008: "Stadig Beskidt"
- 2008: "Mørket Falder På"
