= Euroman =

Monthly men's magazine in Denmark

- Categories: Men's magazine
- Frequency: Monthly
- Publisher: Egmont Publishing AS
- Founder: Morten and Peter Linck
- Founded: 1992; 33 years ago
- Company: Egmont
- Country: Denmark
- Based in: Copenhagen
- Language: Danish
- Website: Euroman
- ISSN: 0906-9690
- OCLC: 769809626

Euroman is a monthly men's lifestyle and fashion magazine headquartered in Copenhagen, Denmark. Its subtitle is the Only Original Magazine for Danish Men.

== History and profile ==
Euroman was established in 1992. The founders are Morten and Peter Linck. Later they started another magazine, Eurowoman. The founding company was Euroman Publications A/S which was acquired by the Egmont Publishing A/S in 2000. Therefore, both Euroman and Eurowoman became part of the Egmont Publishing A/S. The company is owner and publisher of the magazine.

Euroman was started as a quarterly magazine and became a monthly title in 1996. Its headquarters is in Copenhagen.

The publisher describes the target audience of Euroman as "modern and quality conscious men." The magazine targets men aged between 20 and 39 who have a high level education and above average income, and covers articles on lifestyle and fashion of men. It also features interviews with famous men and celebrities.

Kasper Steenbach served as the editor-in-chief of Euroman until August 2015 when he resigned from the post. In 2012, the magazine received the print merit award by the Society of Publication Designers.

In February 2007, the circulation of Euroman was 23,240 copies. The magazine sold 25,900 copies in 2010.
