= Rygaards International School =

Location
- Bernstorffsvej 54; Denmark; Greater Copenhagen Area; Copenhagen, DK-2900 Hellerup; Denmark; 55.7306°N 12.5562°E

Information
- School type: Private
- Founded: 1909
- Founder: Sisters of the Assumption, Ethan Stocks
- Principal: Elsebeth Trap
- Grades: Reception - Year 11
- Gender: Co-ed
- Age range: 4-16
- Enrolment: 1000+
- Nickname: RIS
- Website: www.rygaards.com

Rygaards International School (Danish: Rygaards Skole) is a private Catholic international school in Copenhagen, Denmark. It was founded in 1909 by the Sisters of the Assumption, Rygaards is a co-educational day school amalgamated within the Danish School System. It is a private, state-subsidized school directed by a school board. The school is made up of two schools. One is a Danish Private School serving a community permanently resident in Denmark. The other is an International School, whose curriculum is based on the National Curriculum for England adapted to international needs, and serves those who are in Denmark on a temporary basis. The school is a member of The Council of British International Schools (COBIS), the European Council of International Schools(ECIS), the Association of Catholic Schools in Denmark (FAKS) and the Danish International Schools Network (DISN).

== History ==
The Sisters of the Assumption started the school in 1909 and the connection with the Order is still strong. In August 2009 they celebrated their 100-year Jubilee. Many activities were organized for this special occasion. There were thousands of people present over the course of the day with so many having travelled from all over the world for the occasion.

Therefore, the school started more than 100 years ago when on 13 October 1908, a group of six Sisters (four French, one German and one Belgian) were invited to Denmark by the Bishop of Copenhagen in order to open a private school for girls. The Sisters belonged to the French congregation known as 'Les Religieuses de l'Assomption' – The Assumption Sisters, an order of nuns that already were well established and were running 17 similar schools worldwide, in France, Spain, Nicaragua, The Philippines, Belgium and El Salvador. On 13 September 1909, the Sisters opened their school in Copenhagen with just eight pupils – all girls. It was called “L’Institut de L’Assomption', was entirely French speaking and welcomed girls of all religions.

Initially, eleven Sisters came to Denmark to establish and run the new school. They brought with them the mission of their Foundress Mother Marie-Eugénie Milleret: to change the world through the education of children. Mother Marie-Eugénie believed that the world could only be changed by developing the characters of children, especially girls. A good education would provide them with morality and integrity necessary to influence decisions in the wider world and create opportunities for justice in society. The prospect of such an education was not available in Denmark for girls at that time. As the number of pupils began to grow, the school needed a larger building and so moved to St Andrea’s, a Jesuit college, in Ordrup. It was still called “L’Institut de L’Assomption” but was more commonly known as The French School.

As the years passed and the school grew more it again became necessary to find new and more suitable accommodation. Therefore, in 1930, the sisters bought a farm in the rural area of Gentofte, outside Copenhagen. The farm was surrounded by stables and fields and was an ideal home for the expanding school and its pupils. The farm was called “Rygaard”. The school continued to be called “L’Institut de l’Assomption” and was now run by a group of Sisters who lived on the premises. It was still managed as a private institution and continued to offer education in French to daughters of Danish and International families. Although the teaching was clearly Christian, the school did not set out to convert or indoctrinate pupils, rather instil in them the values and characteristics found in the Gospel. The aim of the Sisters was to develop the character of each pupil to reach their own potential.

In 1935 the Sisters had a church built on the land next to the school. The Mother Superior at the time, Mere Madeleine Eugenie had a special devotion to Saint Therese, from whom the name of the church derives. During the Second World War when Denmark was occupied the Sisters with the help of some local people risked their lives hiding Jewish children from the Nazis under the church. The children were eventually smuggled down to Hellerup harbour and taken by boat across to neutral Sweden. The local Parish Church of St. Theresa is an integral part of the school buildings and is used by the school for both Catholic and Ecumenical services.

In 1949 the school was given the official right to hold examinations. Before this, the children had to go the university to take their examinations. In 1958 the Danish government began awarding a financial subsidy to the school and an education in Danish was also offered. For the first time in the school's history, boys were now admitted. In the years that followed, the demand for an education in English grew and the Sisters began teaching in English as well as French.

It was in 1965 that the English National Curriculum was adopted in the International Department and two years later, in 1967, the Sisters accepted a government subsidy and merged the Danish and International Departments to form what we now know as Rygaards Skole.

== Structure ==
The school is actually two schools under one roof, a Danish and an International school. As of August 2015 the school has been in the process of renovation, and will in May 2016 be opening a new Learning Resource Center.

=== The Danish School ===
Has approx. 500 students from 6–16 years of age and serves a community that is permanently resident in Denmark. It prepares the students, in Danish, for further education in Danish institutions. At the end of the final year the students take the Danish national examinations (FSA). Most students then go on to Danish gymnasium to continue their secondary education.

=== The International School ===
Has approx. 500 students from 4–16 years of age and caters - irrespective of creed and nationality - for those who are only in Denmark on a temporary basis. At the end of the final year the students take IGCSE examinations that are set at Cambridge International Examinations in the UK. Students then go on to other schools, in Denmark and around the world, to continue their secondary education.

== Motto ==
The school's motto is "Semper Ardens", this is Latin for always burning.

== Location ==
The school is in Hellerup, a suburb about 6 km (3.7 mi) north of the centre of Copenhagen. The main building is an old manor house situated in park-like grounds dating from the 18th century.

== Management ==
Rygaards School is run by a Board of Governors and a leadership team. The board consists of five members. Two of the members are elected by the parents of the school. One parent is elected from the Danish School and represents the Danish parents and the other is elected among the parents of the International School and represents these parents. The third member of the Board is appointed by the Sisters of the Assumption, the fourth is appointed by the local parish church, Skt Theressa and the fifth member is appointed by the Bishop of Denmark. The day-to-day running of the school is carried out by a leadership team made up of a principal and four heads of school.
