= Hellerup =

Suburb of Copenhagen in Gentofte Kommune

Coordinates: 55°44′0″N 12°34′0″E

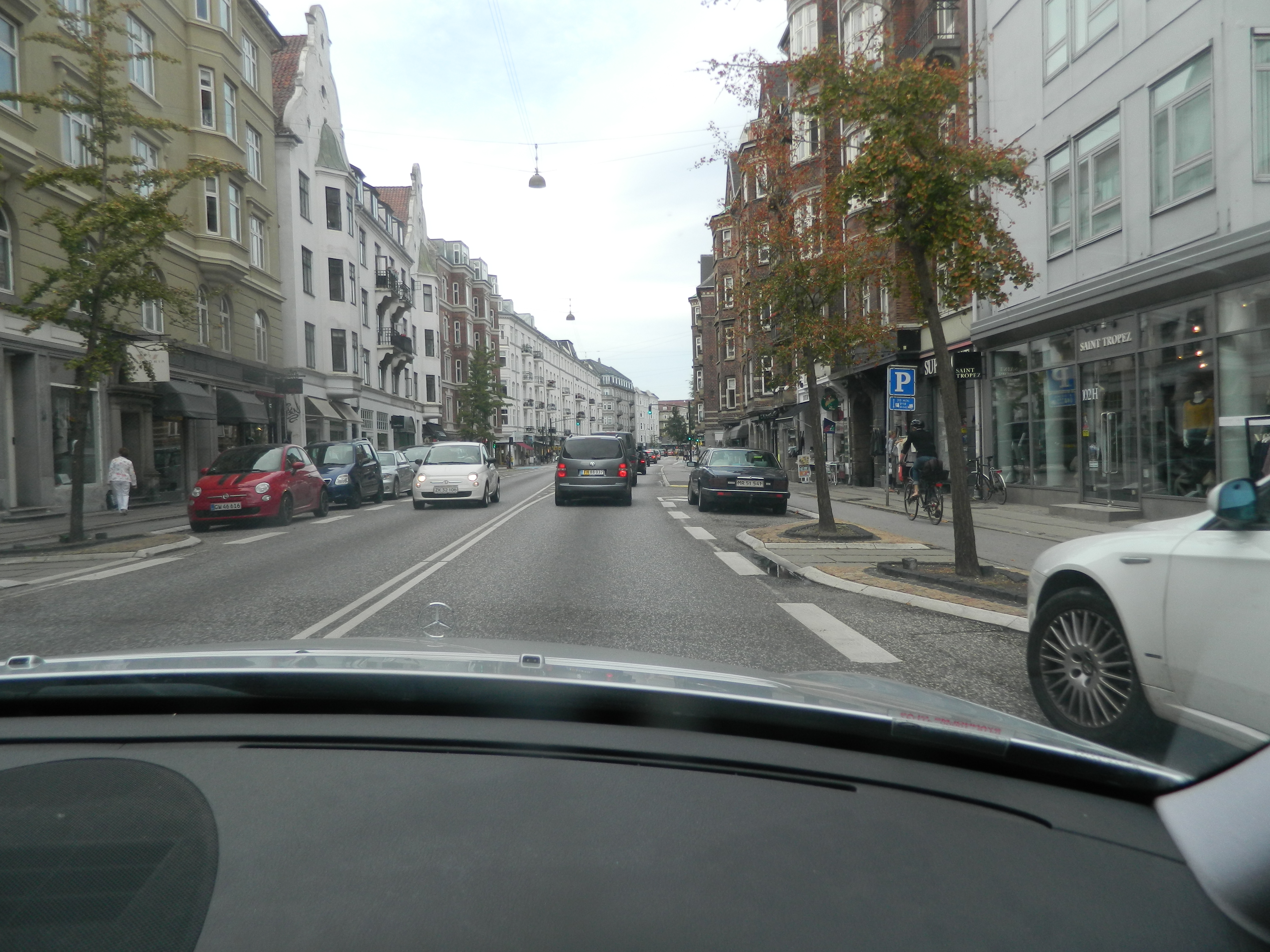
The street Strandvejen through the northern Copenhagen district Hellerup

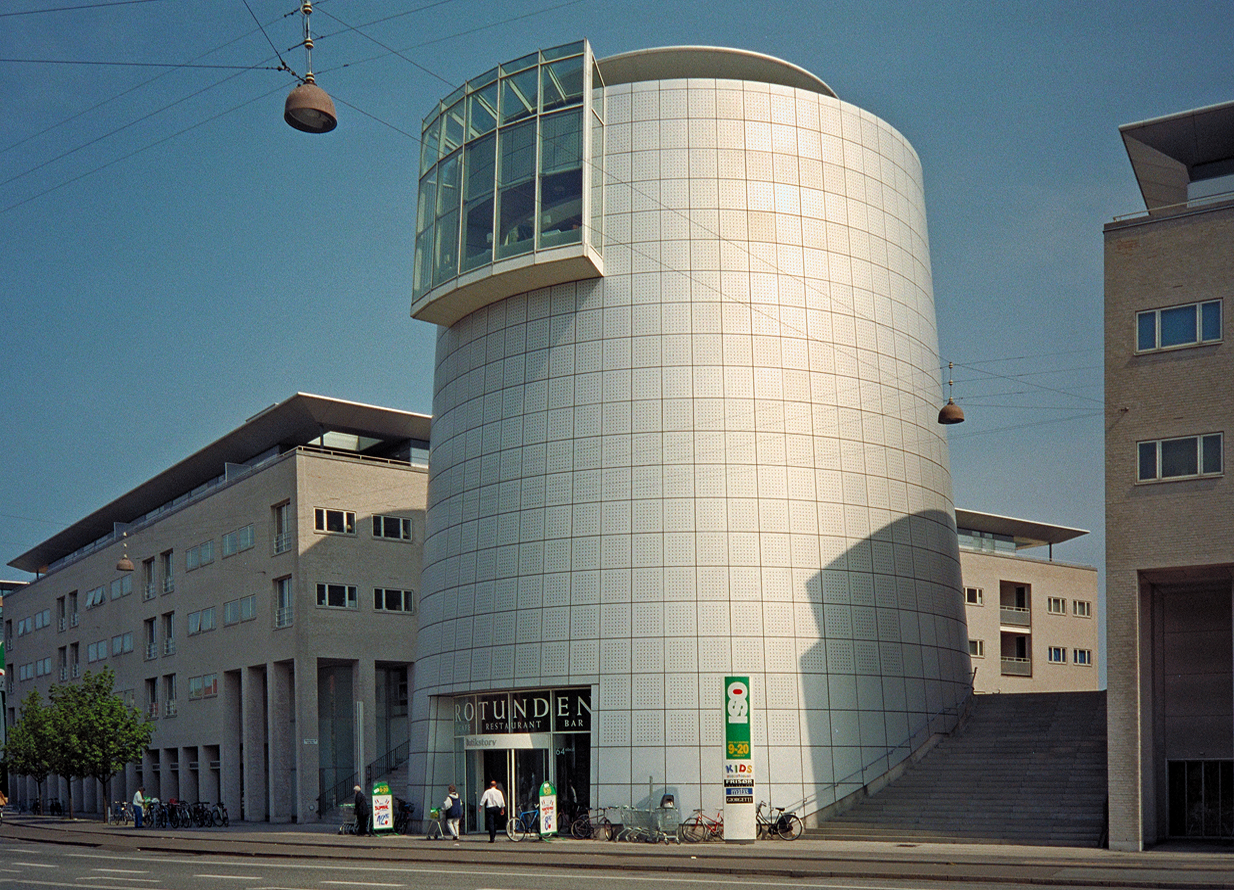
Rotunden at Strandvejen in Hellerup

Hellerup (Danish pronunciation: [ˈhɛlˀəʁɔp]) is a very affluent district of Gentofte Municipality in the suburbs of Copenhagen, Denmark. The most urban part of the district is centred on Strandvejen and is bordered by Østerbro to the south and the Øresund to the east. It comprises Tuborg Havn, the redeveloped brewery site of Tuborg Breweries, with the Waterfront Shopping Center, a marina and the headquarters of several large companies. Other parts of the district consist of single family detached homes. Local landmarks include the science centre Experimentarium and the art Øregaard Museum.

== Geography ==
With an area of approximately 515 hectares, Hellerup covers 20% of the municipality. The district is bounded by the municipal border with Copenhagen (Østerbro) to the south, the Øresund to the east, Charlottenlund Forrest to the north, Lyngbyvej to the southwest and Niels Andersens Vej/Eivindsvej to the northwest. As of a January 2012, Hellerup had a population of 18,781, equaling 25% of the municipal population.

The Hellerup postal district (2900 Hellerup) includes a somewhat larger area since part of Østerbro has the postal code 2900 Hellerup.

== History ==
=== Country houses and open countryside ===
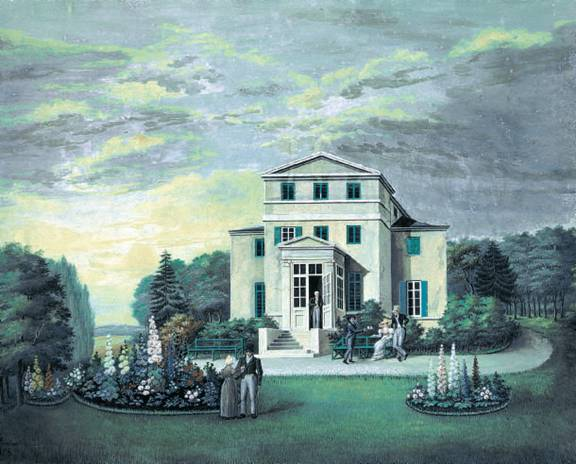
Namesake Hellerupgård as it appeared after 1802

In spite of its name, with the suffix -rup, Hellerup does not originate in an old village. In the 18th century the area was still open countryside with scattered country houses. One of them, Lokkerup, was renamed Hellerupgård when it was acquired by Johan David Heller in 1748. It would later lend its name to the modern district of Hellerup. Hellerupgård was later purchased by the merchant and shipowner Erich Erichsen. He commissioned the French architect Joseph-Jacques Ramée to build a new house in 1802. Other country houses included Øregård, Blidah and Taffelbay.

One of the oldest properties in the area was Vartov, a former watermill which had been acquired by Frederick II in 1566 and used as a hunting lodge. It was converted into a hospital for the poor in 1607 and later used as a home for beggars after a new hospital was built closer to the city. The naval officer Charles Frédéric le Sage de Fontenay acquired it in the 18th century and converted it into a country house.

=== Harbour and early industry ===
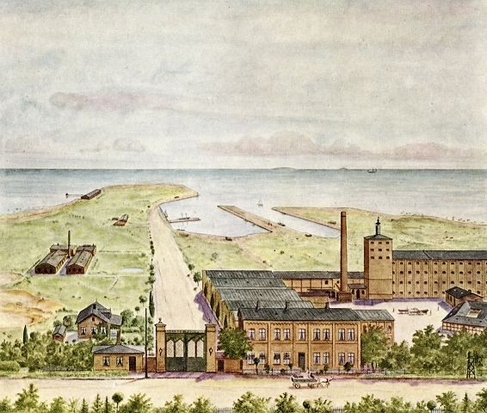
Tuborg Breweries with the small harbor in the background, c. 1880

A harbor was built on the coast between 1869 and 1873. The new Tuborg Brewery was inaugurated that year.

=== C. L. Ibsen and redevelopment of the area ===
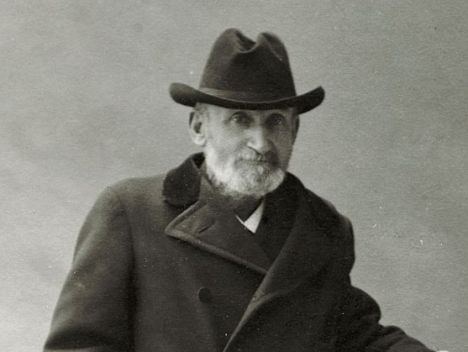
Carl Ludvig Ibsen

In 1887, Carl Ludvig Ibsen began to acquire land in the area with the intention to sell it off in lots to developers and private citizens. He purchased Hellerupgård, Lille Mariendal and Slukefter in Hellerup as well as Smakkegård, Rygård, Lundegård and Stengård in Gentofte. The land in Hellerup alone added up to 37 hectares. He also reclaimed an area along the coast just north of Tuborg Breweries, leading to the creation of the three parallel streets resulted in the streets Frederikkevej, Marievej og Carolinevej. He did not build on the land himself but prepared it with sewers and roads and then sold it off in lots to developers and private citizens. In the mid-1890s, redevelopment of the areas on the west side of Strandvejen began, resulting in streets such as Ryvangs Allé, Svanemøllevej, Callisensvej, Ehlersvej and Tuborgvej. A new gasworks, Strandvejsgasværket, opened adjacent to Tuborg Breweries in 1893. Many of the new homes had WCs and electricity.

In 1916, Ibsen placed his remaining land in a company, A/S De Ibsenske Grunde i Gjentofte Sogn, which existed until 1945.

== Present day ==
Notable sites in Hellerup include "Store og Lille Tuborg", which later lent the name to the Tuborg breweries that opened on the site and operated until the merger of the companies brewing operations with Carlsberg. As of 1996, it has been a residential area with numerous apartments overlooking the harbour. The site is also home to the headquarters of several Danish and international companies.

Hellerup is home to the science center Experimentarium.

The coast road, Strandvejen, runs through the main thoroughfare of the town and is home to numerous shops and boutiques. Other features of Strandvejen are the beach at Charlottenlund Beach Park and Charlottenlund Palace. Hellerup also has two churches, one built in 1900 and the other in 1959.

The ASA Film studio, founded in 1936, was based in Hellerup and produced some of the most notable films in Denmark.

== Education ==
Tranegårdskolen is a state school located in Hellerup. Among others it is attended by the four children of the Danish King and Queen.

Rygaards International School is located in Hellerup. Hellerup School is also located in Hellerup. It is known as the school of the future partly because of the open layout, international contacts and project-based education. It runs a five-year Maths and Science programme in collaboration with Gammel Hellerup Gymnasium.

Gammel Hellerup Gymnasium is a public secondary school that was attended by Prince Felix of Denmark from 2018 to 2021.

Øregård Gymnasium was founded in 1903 as Plock Ross School. In 1919, Gentofte municipality took over the school, which was renamed Øregård Gymnasium. In 1924, the school moved into a new main building designed by architects GB Hagen and Edward Thomsen.

== Notable people ==
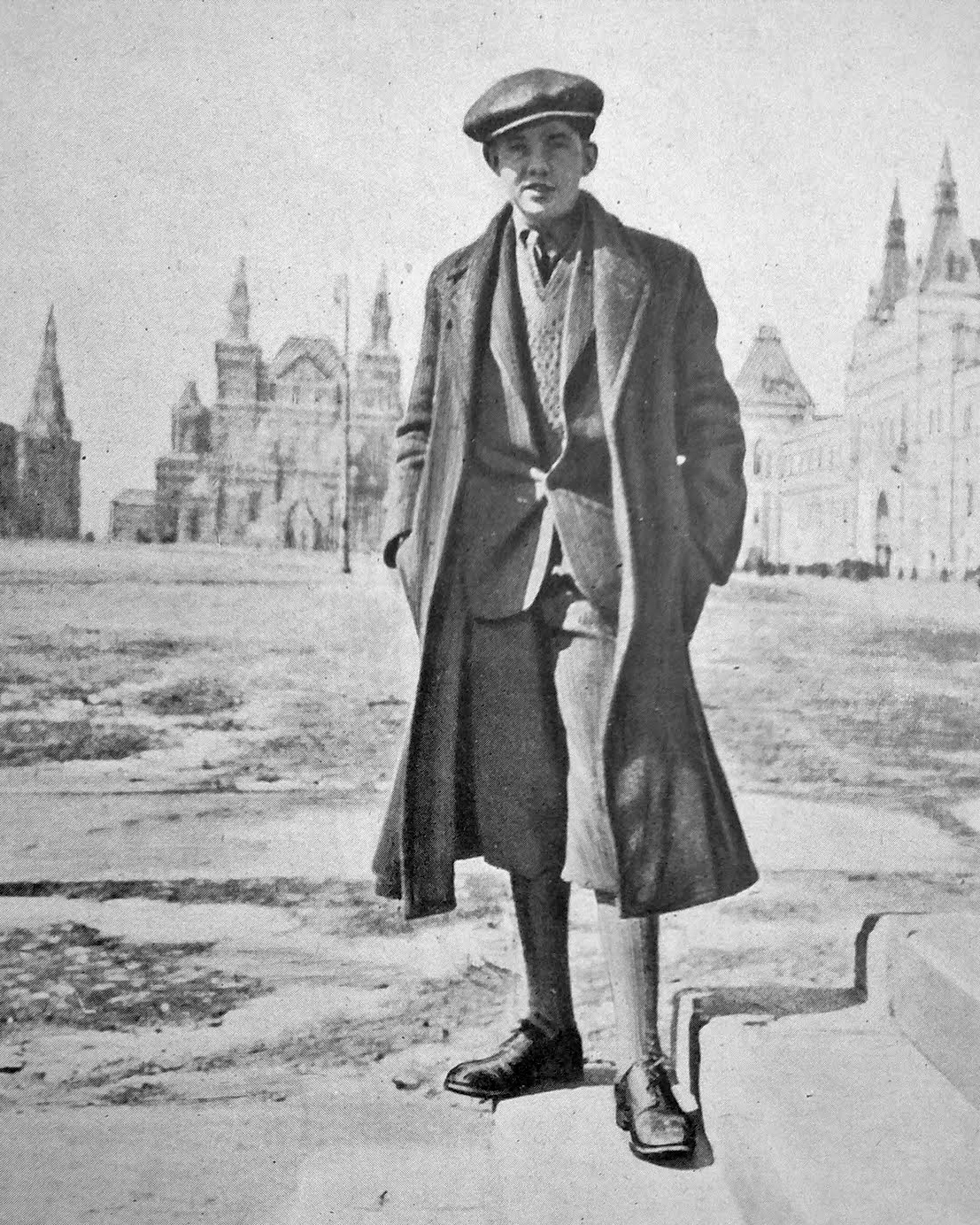
Palle Huld, 1928

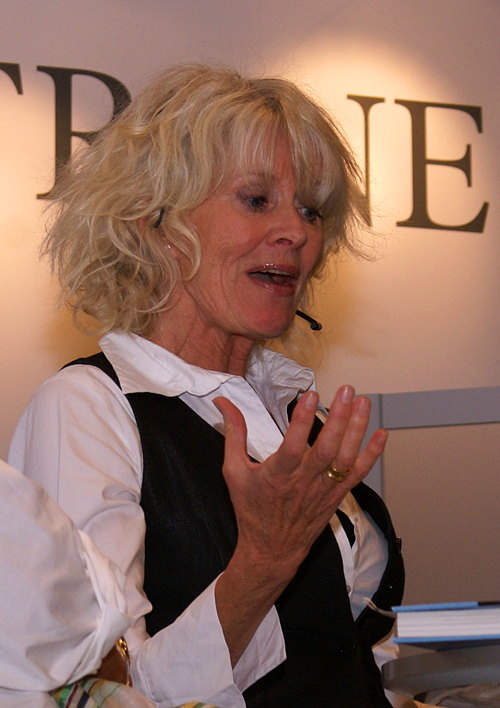
Lisbet Lundquist, 2008

=== Arts and entertainment ===
- Frederik Sødring (1809–1862 in Hellerup) a Danish landscape painter
- Lorenz Frølich (1820–1908 in Hellerup) a Danish painter, illustrator, graphic artist and etcher
- Clara Wæver (1855–1930 in Hellerup) was a Danish embroiderer
- Karina Bell (1898 in Hellerup – 1979) a Danish film actress
- Palle Huld (1912 in Hellerup – 2010) a Danish film actor and writer
- Sigrid Horne-Rasmussen (1915 in Hellerup – 1982) a Danish stage and film actress
- Hans-Henrik Krause (1918 in Hellerup – 2002) a Danish actor and film director
- Poul Bundgaard (1922 in Hellerup – 1998) a Danish actor
- Birgit Sadolin (born 1933 in Hellerup) a Danish actress
- Finn Aabye (born 1935 in Hellerup) a film producer, former director of Danish Film Institute
- Lars Bloch (born 1938 in Hellerup) a Danish actor and producer
- Lisbet Lundquist (born 1943 in Hellerup) a Danish film actress
- Henrik Prip (born 1960 in Hellerup) a Danish actor
- Mew Alternative rock band who were signed to international major record label, Sony
- Pede B (born 1984 in Hellerup) stage name of Peter Ankjær Bigaard, a Danish rapper
- Stine Fischer Christensen (1985), a Danish actress
- Leonora (born 1998 in Hellerup), stage name of Leonora Colmor Jepsen, a Danish singer and former competitive figure skater

=== Public thinking and business ===
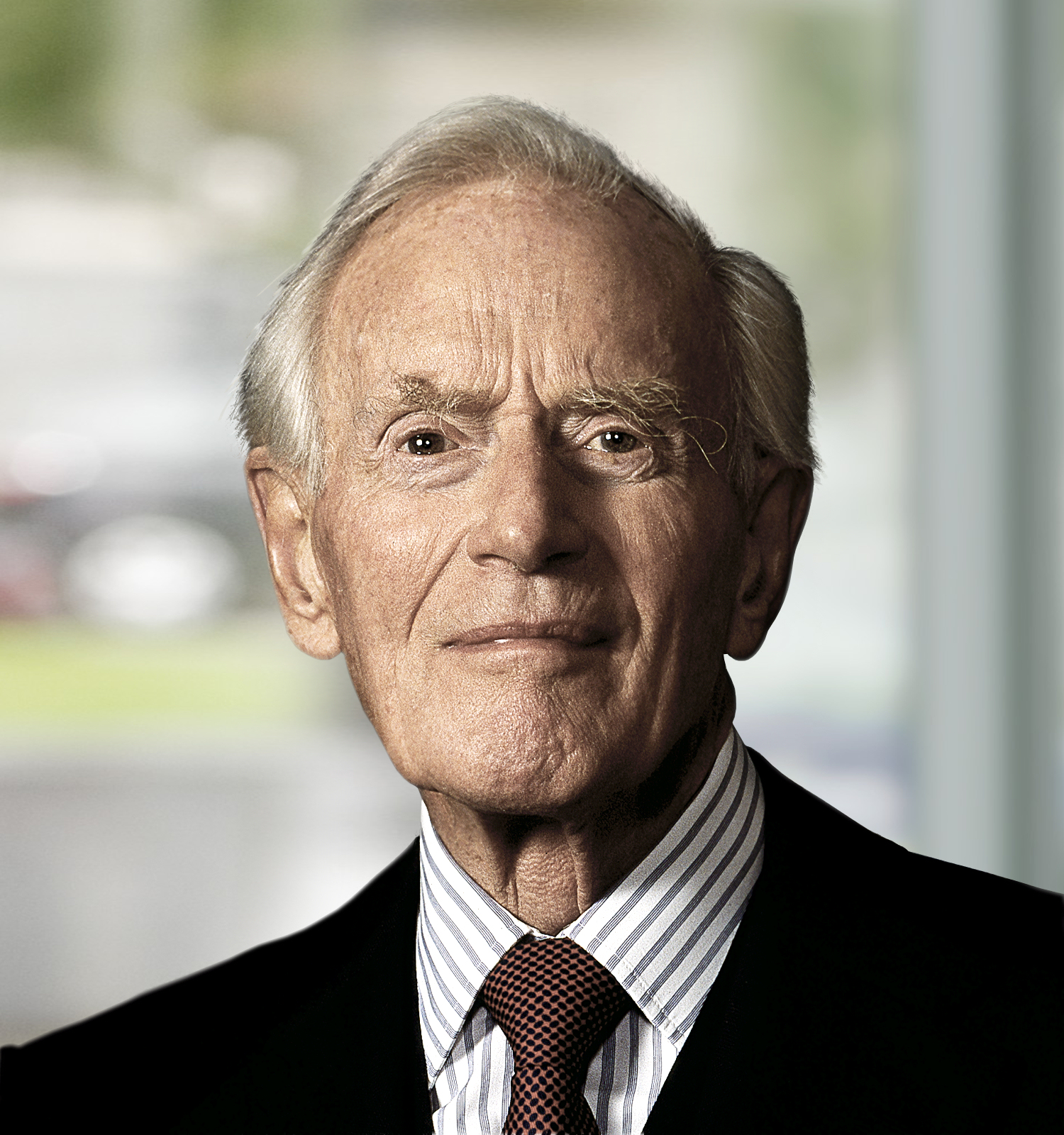
Mærsk Mc-Kinney Møller

- Holger Pedersen (1867–1953 in Hellerup) a Danish linguist
- Hother A. Paludan (1871–1956 in Hellerup) a Danish architect and civil servant
- Lis Jacobsen (1882–1961 in Hellerup) a Danish philologist, archaeologist and writer
- Carl Gunnar Feilberg (1894–1972 in Hellerup) a Danish geographer, ethnographer and explorer of Asia
- Christian Frederik von Schalburg (1906–1942) a Danish army officer, the second commander of Free Corps Denmark lived in Hellerup in the 1920s
- Vera Schalburg (1907–1946) a Soviet, German and British agent, lived in Hellerup in the 1920s
- Mærsk Mc-Kinney Møller (1913 in Hellerup – 2012) a Danish shipping magnate and Denmark's wealthiest person
- Karl Gustav Stricker Brøndsted (1915 in Hellerup – 1945) a member of the Danish resistance executed by the German occupying power

=== Sport ===
- Hans Bjerrum (1899 in Hellerup – 1979) a Danish field hockey player, team silver medallist at the 1920 Summer Olympics later founded Bierrum which makes concrete cooling towers
- Jørgen Ulrich (1935 in Hellerup – 2010) a Danish tennis player
- Torben Piechnik (born 1963 in Hellerup) a Danish former professional footballer with over 400 caps
- Paul Elvstrøm (born 1928 in Hellerup) a Danish sailor who won four Olympic gold medals and twenty world titles in a range of classes including Snipe, Soling, Star, Flying Dutchman, Finn, 505, and 5.5 Metre. For his achievements, Elvstrøm was chosen as "Danish Sportsman of the Century.
- Nicolas Beer (born 1996 in Hellerup) a Danish racing driver

=== Science and academia ===
- Andreas Mogensen (born 1976) Danish astronaut and engineer. The first Dane in space
- Aage Bohr (1922–2009 in Hellerup), Danish physicist and recipient of the Nobel Prize in Physics in 1975. Son of world-renowned physicist Niels Bohr
- Kaj Strand (1907–2000), Danish-American astronomer
