= Medina discography =

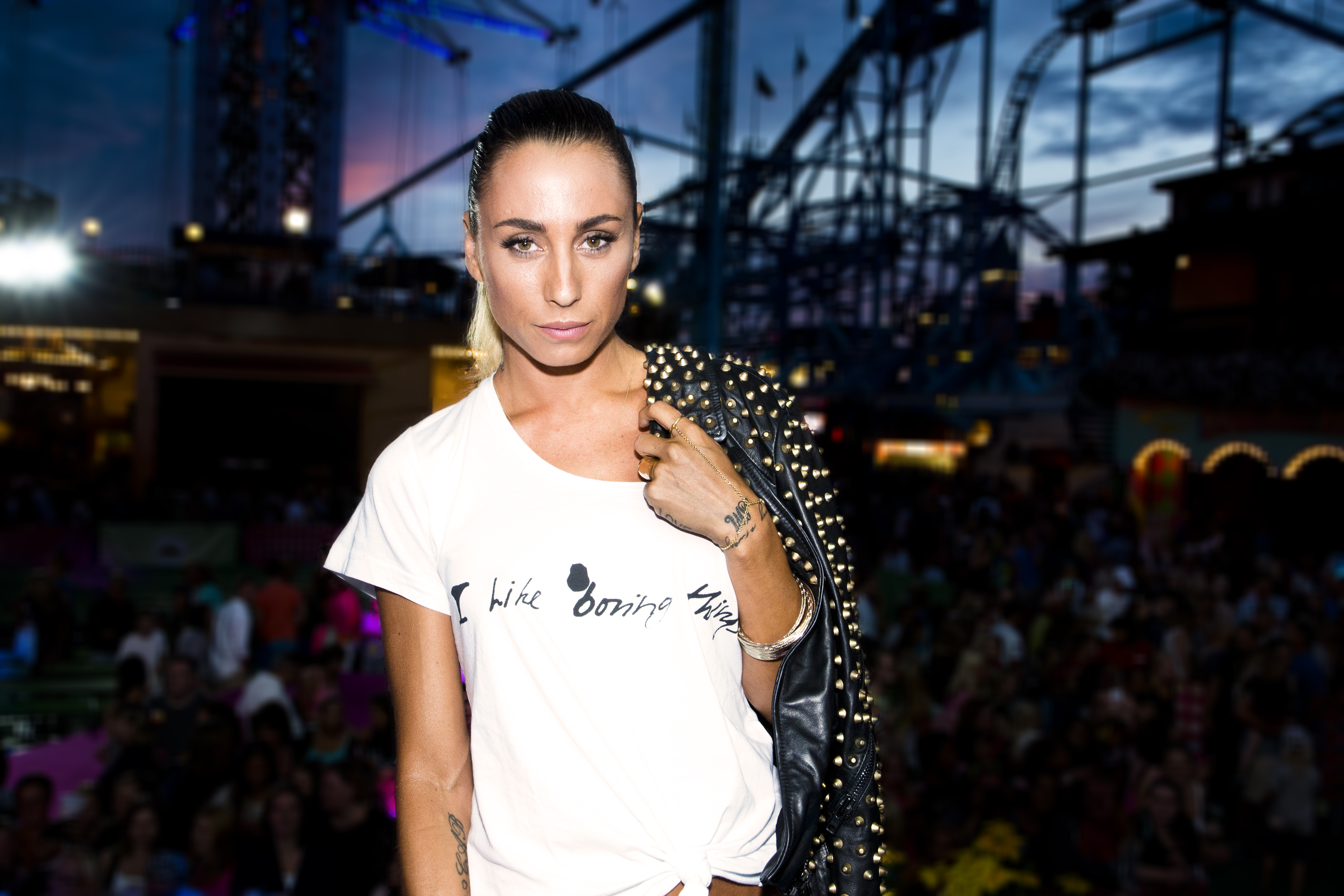
- Medina at Sommarkrysset in Stockholm, 2014
- Studio albums: 7
- Extended plays: 2
- Live albums: 2
- Singles: 43
- Promotional singles: 4

The discography of Danish pop artist Medina consists of seven studio albums. Three of these have spawned commercially successful singles that have peaked at number one on the official Danish singles chart. In total, Medina has forty-three singles with her most successful one internationally being "You and I".

Tæt på, Medina's debut Danish studio album, was released in September 2007. She released the singles in Denmark titled "Flå", "Et øjeblik" and "Alene" in 2007 and released "Okay" in 2008.

Velkommen til Medina, Medina's second Danish studio album, was released in August 2009. She rose to national fame in 2008 with the release of "Kun for mig" (which was later released as the English "You and I"). The single spent six weeks at number 1 on the Danish Singles Chart. The second single off the album, "Velkommen til Medina" also peaked at number 1 in Denmark which spent five weeks at the top of chart. Even Medina's third and fourth single, "Ensom" and "Vi to" peaked at number 2 in Denmark.

Welcome to Medina, Medina's debut English studio album, was released in July 2010. In September 2009, Medina released an English-language version of "Kun for mig", titled "You and I", in the UK, Germany, Austria and Switzerland. This version reached number 39 on the UK Singles Chart and entered the Top 10 on the German Singles Chart.

For altid, Medina's third Danish studio album, was released in September 2011. The first three single from the album "For altid", "Synd for dig" and "Kl. 10" peaked at number 1 in Denmark. "12 dage", "Lyser i mørke" and "Har du glemt" also entered the Top 10 in Denmark.

Forever, Medina's second English studio album, was released in June 2012. The album includes the singles "Forever", "Happening", "Boring (It's Too Late)" and "Waiting for Love". A second edition of the album was released entitled Forever 2.0.

Tæt På – Live, Medina's debut Live album, was released in March 2014. The album includes the single "Jalousi", which peaked at number 1 on the Danish Singles Chart.

== Albums ==
=== Danish studio albums ===
| Title | Album details | Peak chart positions | Certifications |
| Title | Album details | DEN | Certifications |
|---|---|---|---|
| Tæt på | Released: September 17, 2007; Label: At:tack; Formats: CD, digital download | — | |
| Velkommen til Medina | Released: August 31, 2009; Label: Labelmade, At:tack; Formats: CD, digital download | 2 | DEN: 5× Platinum |
| For altid | Released: September 19, 2011; Label: Labelmade, A:larm; Formats: CD, digital download | 2 | DEN: 3× Platinum |
| Grim | Released: October 12, 2018; Label: Labelmade, Universal; Formats: CD, digital download | 5 | |
"—" denotes an album that did not chart or was not released in that territory.

=== English studio albums ===
| Title | Album details | Peak chart positions | | | | Certifications |
| Title | Album details | DEN | AUT | GER | SWI | Certifications |
|---|---|---|---|---|---|---|
| Welcome to Medina | Released: July 23, 2010; Label: EMI; Formats: CD, digital download | 11 | 45 | 9 | 24 | DEN: Gold; GER: Gold |
| Forever | Released: June 1, 2012; Label: EMI; Formats: CD, digital download | 15 | 39 | 8 | 13 | |
| We Survive | Released: February 26, 2016; Label: We Love Music; Formats: CD, digital download | 20 | — | 39 | — | |
"—" denotes an album that did not chart or was not released in that territory.

=== Live albums ===
| Title | Album details | Peak chart positions |
| Title | Album details | DEN |
|---|---|---|
| Tæt På – Live | Released: March 17, 2014; Label: Labelmade, A:larm; Formats: CD, digital download | 2 |
| Det Bliver Altid Forår | Released: April 17, 2020; Label: Labelmade; Formats: Digital download | — |

=== Extended plays ===
| Title | Album details |
|---|---|
| Medina | Released: April 15, 2011; Label: EMI; Formats: digital download |
| Arrogant | Released: April 4, 2014; Label: Labelmade, A:larm; Formats: digital download |

== Singles ==
=== Danish singles ===
| Title | Year | Peak chart positions | Certifications | Album |
| Title | Year | DEN | Certifications | Album |
|---|---|---|---|---|
| "Flå" (featuring Ruus) | 2007 | — | | Tæt på |
| "Et øjeblik" (featuring Joe True) | 2007 | — | | Tæt på |
| "Alene" | 2007 | — | | Tæt på |
| "Okay" | 2008 | — | | Tæt på |
| "Kun for mig" | 2008 | 1 | DEN: 2× Platinum (Note: To retrieve singles certifications that currently cannot be found in IFPI Denmark, select the field Track Top-40 along the following listed below: For Kun for mig (2× Platinum), select: Track Top-40: Uge 53-2009; For Velkommen til Medina (Platinum), select: Track Top-40: Uge 53-2009; "Track Top-40". hitlisten.nu. Archived from the original on March 13, 2012.) | Velkommen til Medina |
| "Kun for dig" (featuring L.O.C.) | 2009 | 1 | | Velkommen til Medina |
| "Velkommen til Medina" | 2009 | 1 | DEN: Platinum | Velkommen til Medina |
| "Ensom" | 2009 | 2 | DEN: Platinum | Velkommen til Medina |
| "Vi to" | 2010 | 2 | DEN: 2× Platinum | Velkommen til Medina |
| "For altid" | 2011 | 1 | DEN: Platinum | For altid |
| "Synd for dig" | 2011 | 1 | DEN: Platinum | For altid |
| "Kl. 10" | 2011 | 1 | DEN: Platinum | For altid |
| "12 dage" | 2012 | 8 | | For altid |
| "Lyser i mørke" | 2012 | 5 | DEN: Gold | For altid |
| "Har du glemt" | 2012 | 4 | DEN: Gold | For altid |
| "Jalousi" | 2014 | 1 | DEN: Platinum | Tæt på – Live |
| "Strip Pt. 1" | 2014 | 6 | | Arrogant |
| "Giv Slip" | 2014 | 1 | | Non-album singles |
| "Når intet er godt nok" | 2014 | 1 | DEN: Platinum | Non-album singles |
| "Forgabt (Jeg fucking elsker dig)" | 2016 | 20 | | Non-album singles |
| "Elsk mig" | 2017 | 10 | | Grim |
| "Det smukkeste" | 2017 | 21 | | Grim |
| "Skyttegrav" | 2018 | 27 | | Grim |
| "Det ku' være mig" | 2018 | 22 | | Grim |
| "Folk som os" (with Hjalmer) | 2019 | 39 | | Non-album singles |
| "Sir det ikk" | 2019 | 17 | | Non-album singles |
| "Større end os" | 2020 | — | | Non-album singles |
| "Til den lyse morgen" | 2020 | — | | Non-album singles |
| "I nat" (with Artigeardit) | 2020 | 22 | | Non-album singles |
| "Lidt endnu" (with D1ma) | 2023 | 4 | | Non-album singles |
| "Danser for mig selv" | 2024 | 32 | | Non-album singles |
| "Giv mig alt" | 2024 | 26 | | Non-album singles |
| "Rick Ross Pt. 2" (with Tessa) | 2024 | 5 | | Non-album singles |
| "Gemt dit nummer" (with Burhan G) | 2026 | 6 | | Non-album singles |
| "Den forbandede kærlighed" (with Andreas Odbjerg) | 2026 | 30 | | Non-album singles |
"—" denotes a single that did not chart or was not released in that territory.

=== Non-Danish singles ===
| Title | Year | Peak chart positions | | | | | | | Certifications | Album |
| Title | Year | DEN | AUT | GER | SWE | SWI | UK | US Dance Digital | Certifications | Album |
|---|---|---|---|---|---|---|---|---|---|---|
| "You and I" | 2009 | 23 | 25 | 10 | 42 | 30 | 39 | 42 | GER: Gold | Welcome to Medina |
| "Lonely" | 2010 | — | 46 | 26 | — | — | — | — | | Welcome to Medina |
| "Addiction" | 2010 | 1 | — | 59 | — | — | — | 33 | DEN: Platinum | Welcome to Medina |
| "Gutter" | 2011 | 8 | — | 43 | — | — | — | — | | Welcome to Medina |
| "The One" | 2011 | — | — | 64 | — | — | — | — | | Welcome to Medina |
| "Execute Me" | 2011 | — | — | — | — | — | — | — | | Welcome to Medina |
| "Forever" | 2012 | — | 19 | 21 | — | 15 | — | — | | Forever |
| "Happening" | 2012 | — | — | 68 | — | — | — | — | | Forever |
| "Boring (It's Too Late)" | 2013 | — | — | — | — | — | — | — | | Forever |
| "Waiting for Love" | 2013 | — | — | — | — | — | — | — | | Forever |
| "Junkie" (featuring Svenstrup & Vendelboe) | 2013 | — | — | — | — | — | — | — | | Forever 2.0 |
| "Fool (I Feel Bad for You)" | 2014 | — | — | — | — | — | — | — | | Forever 2.0 |
| "We Survive" | 2016 | — | — | — | — | — | — | — | | We Survive |
| "Único" | 2017 | — | — | — | — | — | — | — | | Non-album singles |
| "Si Tú Fueras Mía" (with LennyGM) | 2017 | — | — | — | — | — | — | — | | Non-album singles |
| "Beautiful" | 2017 | — | — | — | — | — | — | — | | Non-album singles |
| "Holding On" | 2019 | — | — | — | — | — | — | — | | Non-album singles |
"—" denotes a single that did not chart or was not released in that territory.

=== As a featured artist ===
| Title | Year | Peak chart positions | | Album |
| Title | Year | DEN | UK | Album |
|---|---|---|---|---|
| "100 dage" (Thomas Helmig featuring Medina) | 2009 | 1 | — | Tommy Boy |
| "Mest ondt" (Burhan G featuring Medina) | 2010 | 1 | — | Burhan G |
| "Du säger du älskar mig" (Supermarkets featuring Medina) | 2011 | — | — | Non-album single |
| "Lågsus" (Specktors featuring Medina) | 2012 | 1 | — | Kadavermarch |
| "Hvad der sker her" (Nik & Ras featuring Medina) | 2012 | 5 | — | Non-album singles |
| "Overdose" (Wolfgang Gartner featuring Medina) | 2013 | — | — | Non-album singles |
| "This Could Be Something" (Anton Ewald featuring Medina) | 2014 | — | — | On My Way |
| "Clarity" (Remix) (Zedd featuring Medina) | 2014 | — | — | Clarity (Deluxe Edition) |
| "Ud af mørket" (Shaka Loveless featuring Medina) | 2015 | 21 | — | Til vi ligger |
| "Hvis det virkelig er vigtigt" (Benal featuring Medina) | 2017 | — | — | Hvis det virkelig er vigtigt |
| "Venstre" (Unge Ferrari & Medina) | 2017 | — | — | Romeo må dø |
| "First Time" (M-22 featuring Medina) | 2017 | — | 20 | Non-album singles |
| "Stjernerne falder" (Marie Key featuring Medina) | 2018 | — | — | Giganter |
| "Who Do You Love" (Zookeepers & Medina) | 2019 | — | — | Non-album singles |
| "No Skrubs" (TopGunn featuring Medina) | 2020 | — | — | Sas |
"—" denotes a single that did not chart or was not released in that territory.

== Promotional singles ==
| Title | Year | Album |
|---|---|---|
| "Satser alt" | 2007 | Non-album single |
| "Selfish" | 2010 | Welcome to Medina |
| "Keep Me Hanging" | 2012 | Forever |
| "Jeg venter" | 2013 | For altid |

== Other charted songs ==
| Title | Year | Peak chart positions | Album |
| Title | Year | DEN | Album |
|---|---|---|---|
| "Har du det ligesom mig" (featuring Young) | 2011 | 33 | For altid |
| "Hvis bare" (featuring Skinz) | 2012 | 39 | For altid |
| "Rick Ross" | 2024 | 40 | Velkommen til Medina |

== Guest appearances ==
| Title | Year | Other performer(s) | Album |
|---|---|---|---|
| "Jeg troede" | 2006 | — | Fidibus soundtrack |
| "Kender du mig" | 2006 | Joe True | Fidibus soundtrack |
| "Der findes ingen" | 2014 | Skinz | Byen sover aldrig |

== Music videos ==
| Year | Title | Director |
|---|---|---|
| 2007 | "Et øjeblik" | —N/a |
| 2008 | "Okay" | —N/a |
| 2008 | "Kun For Mig" | —N/a |
| 2009 | "You and I" | —N/a |
| 2009 | "Velkommen til Medina" | Peter Stenbæk |
| 2010 | "Ensom" | Tomace |
| 2010 | "Vi to" | Sigurd Hoeyen |
| 2010 | "Lonely" | —N/a |
| 2011 | "Gutter" | —N/a |
| 2011 | "Addiction" | —N/a |
| 2011 | "For altid" | Michael Sauer Christensen |
| 2011 | "The One" | —N/a |
| 2011 | "Synd for dig" | Martin Skovbjerg |
| 2011 | "Kl. 10" | Michael Sauer Christensen |
| 2011 | "Execute Me" | —N/a |
| 2012 | "12 dage" | Martin Skovbjerg |
| 2012 | "Forever" | —N/a |
| 2012 | "Lyser i mørke" | Martin Skovbjerg |
| 2012 | "Happening" | Martin Skovbjerg |
| 2012 | "Boring (It's Too Late)" | Michael Sauer Christensen |
| 2012 | "Har du glemt" | Martin Skovbjerg |
| 2013 | "Waiting for Love" | —N/a |
| 2013 | "Junkie" | —N/a |
| 2014 | "Jalousi" | —N/a |
| 2014 | "This Could Be Something" (Anton Ewald feat. Medina) | —N/a |
| 2014 | "Giv slip" | —N/a |
| 2014 | "Når intet er godt nok" | —N/a |
| 2016 | "We Survive" | —N/a |
| 2016 | "Forgabt (Jeg fucking elsker dig)" | —N/a |
| 2017 | "Elsk Mig" | —N/a |
| 2018 | "Skyttegrav" | —N/a |
| 2019 | "Sir det ikk" | —N/a |
| 2019 | "Holding On" | —N/a |
