= List of number-one hits of 2011 (Denmark) =

This article shows all the songs that has been number one on the official Danish singles chart, Tracklisten, in 2011, as compiled by Nielsen Music Control in association with the Danish branch of the International Federation of the Phonographic Industry (IFPI).

== Chart history ==
Issue date	Song	Artist(s)	Ref.
7 January	"Sjus"	Kato featuring Ida Corr, Camille Jones, Johnson	
14 January	"Det burde ikk være sådan her"	Xander	
21 January	"Hold It Against Me"	Britney Spears	
28 January	"Out of It"	Fallulah	
4 February	"Out of It"	Fallulah	
11 February	"Out of It"	Fallulah	
18 February	"Grenade"	Bruno Mars	
25 February	"Grenade"	Bruno Mars	
4 March	"Mod solnedgangen"	Nik & Jay	
11 March	"Mod solnedgangen"	Nik & Jay	
18 March	"Jeg vil altid"	Jokeren	
25 March	"Mod solnedgangen"	Nik & Jay	
1 April	"Min øjesten"	Sarah	
8 April	"Min øjesten"	Sarah	
15 April	"Min øjesten"	Sarah	
22 April	"Min klub først"	Rosa Lux featuring Alberte	
29 April	"Party Rock Anthem"	LMFAO featuring Lauren Bennett and GoonRock	
6 May	"Dybt vand"	Svenstrup & Vendelboe featuring Nadia Malm	
13 May	"Mr. Saxobeat"	Alexandra Stan	
20 May	"Mr. Saxobeat"	Alexandra Stan	
27 May	"Klaus Pagh"	Suspekt	
3 June	"The Lazy Song"	Bruno Mars	
10 June	"For altid"	Medina	
17 June	"For altid"	Medina	
24 June	"For altid"	Medina	
1 July	"Loca People"	Sak Noel	
8 July	"Loca People"	Sak Noel	
15 July	"Loca People"	Sak Noel	
22 July	"Loca People"	Sak Noel	
29 July	"Loca People"	Sak Noel	
5 August	"Loca People"	Sak Noel	
12 August	"Moves Like Jagger"	Maroon 5 featuring Christina Aguilera	
19 August	"Moves Like Jagger"	Maroon 5 featuring Christina Aguilera	
26 August	"Moves Like Jagger"	Maroon 5 featuring Christina Aguilera	
2 September	"I mine øjne"	Rasmus Seebach	
9 September	"I mine øjne"	Rasmus Seebach	
16 September	"I mine øjne"	Rasmus Seebach	
23 September	"Fugt i fundamentet"	Nik & Ras featuring Pharfar and Burhan G	
30 September	"Synd for dig"	Medina	
7 October	"We Found Love"	Rihanna featuring Calvin Harris	
14 October	"We Found Love"	Rihanna featuring Calvin Harris	
21 October	"We Found Love"	Rihanna featuring Calvin Harris	
28 October	"We Found Love"	Rihanna featuring Calvin Harris	
4 November	"We Found Love"	Rihanna featuring Calvin Harris	
11 November	"Geronimo"	Aura Dione	
18 November	"Geronimo"	Aura Dione	
25 November	"Geronimo"	Aura Dione	
2 December	"We Found Love"	Rihanna featuring Calvin Harris	
9 December	"Kl. 10"	Medina	
16 December	"Kl. 10"	Medina	
23 December	"Kl. 10"	Medina	
30 December	"Kl. 10"	Medina	

== See also ==
- 2011 in music
