= Svenstrup & Vendelboe (album) =

Studio album by Svenstrup & Vendelboe
- Released: 14 October 2013
- Recorded: 2009–2013
- Genres: House, pop, dance
- Length: 60:26
- Labels: labelmade, disko:wax
- Producers: Svenstrup, Vendelboe

Singles from Svenstrup & Vendelboe
- 1. "I nat" Released: 5 April 2010; 2. "Dybt vand" Released: 11 April 2011; 3. "Glemmer dig aldrig" Released: 3 February 2012; 4. "Where Do We Go from Here" Released: 12 November 2012; 5. "Hvor ondt det gør" Released: 13 September 2013; 6. "Alt er intet" Released: 2 January 2014; 7. "Battlefield" Released: 2 juny 2014

Svenstrup & Vendelboe is the self-titled debut album by the Danish DJ and producer duo Svenstrup & Vendelboe. It was released October 14, 2013, on the :labelmade: and disco: wax. The album contains four platinum-selling singles "I Nat", "Dybt Vand", "Glemmer Dig Aldrig", "Where Do We Go From Here" and more recently "Hvor Ondt Det Gør" . The album peaked in Danish charts on 7 position.

== Track listing ==
| No. | Title | Writer(s) | Length |
|---|---|---|---|
| 1. | "Intro" | Kasper Svenstrup, Thomas Vendelboe | 2:43 |
| 2. | "I nat" (featuring Karen) | Svenstrup, Vendelboe, Karen Rosenberg | 3:38 |
| 3. | "Glemmer dig aldrig" (featuring Nadia Malm) | Svenstrup, Vendelboe, Engelina Andrina | 3:10 |
| 4. | "Helicopter" | Svenstrup, Vendelboe | 5:23 |
| 5. | "Dybt vand" (featuring Nadia Malm) | Svenstrup, Vendelboe, Andrina | 4:00 |
| 6. | "Battlefield" (featuring Camille Jones) | Svenstrup, Vendelboe, Andrina, Camille Jones | 5:06 |
| 7. | "Alt er intet" (featuring Theis) | Svenstrup, Vendelboe, Andrina, Theis Andersen | 4:15 |
| 8. | "Du skal aldrig lede mere" (featuring Xander) | Svenstrup, Vendelboe, Andrina, Xander Linnet | 6:03 |
| 9. | "Sticky Fingers" | Svenstrup, Vendelboe | 4:48 |
| 10. | "Where Do We Go from Here" (featuring Christopher) | Svenstrup, Vendelboe, Andrina, Christopher Nissen | 3:12 |
| 11. | "Hvor ondt det gør" (featuring Josefine) | Svenstrup, Vendelboe, Andrina, Clemens Telling | 3:09 |
| 12. | "Proximity Infatuation" | Svenstrup, Vendelboe | 7:39 |
| 13. | "Festen er forbi" (featuring Engelina) | Svenstrup, Vendelboe, Andrina | 3:33 |
| 14. | "Junkie" (bonus track)" (Medina featuring Svenstrup & Vendelboe) | Medina Valbak, Andrina, Svenstrup, Vendelboe | 3:47 |

== Chart performance ==
| Chart (2013) | Peak position |
|---|---|
| Danish Albums (Hitlisten) | 7 |

== Release history ==
| Region | Date | Format | Label |
|---|---|---|---|
| Denmark | 14 October 2013 | Digital Download | Labelmade/Disco:wax |
