= List of number-one hits of 2012 (Denmark) =

This article shows all the songs that has been number one on the official Danish singles chart, Tracklisten, in 2012, as compiled by Nielsen Music Control in association with the Danish branch of the International Federation of the Phonographic Industry (IFPI).

== Chart history ==
Issue date	Song	Artist(s)	Ref.
6 January	"Kl. 10"	Medina	
13 January	"City Boy"	Donkeyboy	
20 January	"City Boy"	Donkeyboy	
27 January	"City Boy"	Donkeyboy	
3 February	"Should've Known Better"	Soluna Samay	
10 February	"Somebody That I Used to Know"	Gotye featuring Kimbra	
17 February	"Somebody That I Used to Know"	Gotye featuring Kimbra	
24 February	"Somebody That I Used to Know"	Gotye featuring Kimbra	
2 March	"Somebody That I Used to Know"	Gotye featuring Kimbra	
9 March	"Somebody That I Used to Know"	Gotye featuring Kimbra	
16 March	"Somebody That I Used to Know"	Gotye featuring Kimbra	
23 March	"Somebody That I Used to Know"	Gotye featuring Kimbra	
30 March	"I Can Be"	Ida	
6 April	"I Can Be"	Ida	
13 April	"I Can Be"	Ida	
20 April	"Drunk in the Morning"	Lukas Graham	
27 April	"Tacata'"	Tacabro	
4 May	"Tacata'"	Tacabro	
11 May	"Tacata'"	Tacabro	
18 May	"Call Me Maybe"	Carly Rae Jepsen	
25 May	"Tomgang"	Shaka Loveless	
1 June	"Euphoria"	Loreen	
8 June	"Euphoria"	Loreen	
15 June	"Euphoria"	Loreen	
22 June	"Euphoria"	Loreen	
29 June	"Call Me Maybe"	Carly Rae Jepsen	
6 July	"Call Me Maybe"	Carly Rae Jepsen	
13 July	"Gi' Mig"	Joey Moe	
20 July	"Lågsus"	Specktors featuring. Medina	
27 July	"Hun tog min guitar"	Muri & Mario	
3 August	"Hun tog min guitar"	Muri & Mario	
10 August	"Flytta på dej!"	Alina Devecerski	
17 August	"Helt min egen"	L.O.C.	
24 August	"Overgir mig langsomt"	Mads Langer	
31 August	"Overgir mig langsomt"	Mads Langer	
7 September	"Hjertestarter"	Nephew	
14 September	"Gangnam Style"	PSY	
21 September	"Gangnam Style"	PSY	
28 September	"Gangnam Style"	PSY	
5 October	"Gangnam Style"	PSY	
12 October	"Gangnam Style"	PSY	
19 October	"Gangnam Style"	PSY	
26 October	"Gangnam Style"	PSY	
2 November	"Better Than Yourself (Criminal Mind Pt 2)"	Lukas Graham	
9 November	"Diamonds"	Rihanna	
16 November	"Diamonds"	Rihanna	
23 November	"Diamonds"	Rihanna	
30 November	"Diamonds"	Rihanna	
7 December	"Diamonds"	Rihanna	
14 December	"Scream & Shout"	will.i.am & Britney Spears	
21 December	"Scream & Shout"	will.i.am & Britney Spears	
28 December	"Scream & Shout"	will.i.am & Britney Spears	

== See also ==
- 2012 in music
