= Forever (Medina album) =

Studio album by Medina
- Released: 1 June 2012
- Recorded: 2011–12
- Genres: Electropop; dance-pop; eurodance; R&B
- Length: 49:25
- Label: EMI
- Producers: Providers, DEEKAY

Medina chronology
For altid (2011)	Forever (2012)	Tæt På - Live (2014)

Forever 2.0

Singles from Forever
- 1. "Forever" Released: April 13, 2012; 2. "Happening" Released: September 14, 2012; 3. "Boring (It's Too Late)" Released: February 22, 2013; 4. "Waiting for Love" Released: May 23, 2013; 5. "Junkie" Released: August 20, 2013; 6. "Fool (I Feel Bad for You)" Released: January 21, 2014

Forever is the second English-language album by Danish singer Medina. It was released on 1 June 2012 through EMI. The album consists of ten original songs and three translated songs from her third Danish album, For altid (2011): "Forever", "Happening" and "Black Lights". "Forever" was released as the album's lead single on 13 April 2012.

== Singles ==
The album's title track, "Forever" was released as the album's lead single on 13 April 2012.

"Happening" was released as the second single on 14 September 2012.

"Boring" was released as the album's first promotional single on 11 May 2012 through the iTunes Store and was released as the album's third single under its new title "Boring (It's Too Late)" on 22 February 2013.

"Waiting for Love" was released as the third promotional single on 25 May 2012 and was released as the fourth single on 23 May 2013.

"Junkie" was released as the fifth single on 20 August 2013.

A remix of "Fool (I Feel Bad for You)" was released as the sixth and final single on 21 January 2014.

=== Promotional singles ===
"Boring" was released as the album's first promotional single on 11 May 2012 through the iTunes Store and was released as the album's third single under its new title "Boring (It's Too Late)" on 22 February 2013.

"Keep Me Hangin'" was released as the second promotional single on 18 May 2012.

"Waiting for Love" was released as the third promotional single on 25 May 2012 and was released as the fourth single on 23 May 2013.

== Track listing ==
No.	Title	Writer(s)	Producer(s)	Length
1.	"Forever"	Medina Valbak, Rasmus Stabell, Jeppe Federspiel, Nazerine Henderson, Engelina Andrina	Providers	3:32
2.	"Butterflies"	Valbak, Stabell, Federspiel, Michelle Bell	Providers	3:42
3.	"Scars"	Valbak, Alexander James, Stabell, Federspiel	Providers	3:39
4.	"Happening"	Valbak, Stabell, Federspiel, Ross Golan	Providers	4:03
5.	"Boring"	Valbak, James, Stabell, Federspiel	Providers	4:03
6.	"Hotels"	Valbak, Stabell, Federspiel, Bell	Providers	3:30
7.	"Good to You"	Valbak, Stabell, Federspiel, Bell, Theis Andersen	Providers	4:02
8.	"Close to Nothing"	Valbak, Stabell, Federspiel	Providers	3:52
9.	"Keep Me Hangin'"	Tim McEwan, Valbak	DEEKAY	3:20
10.	"Black Lights"	Valbak, Stabell, Federspiel, Henderson, Andrina	Providers	3:45
11.	"Waiting for Love"	McEwan, Johannes Jørgensen, Lesley Roy	DEEKAY	4:00
12.	"Like You Hurt Me"	McEwan, Valbak	DEEKAY	3:41
13.	"Threesome"	Valbak, Stabell, Federspiel	Providers	3:41

German iTunes Store additional track
No.	Title	Writer(s)	Producer(s)	Length
14.	"Forever" (Svenstrup & Vendelboe Remix)	Valbak, Stabell, Federspiel, Andrina, Henderson	Svenstrup & Vendelboe (remix)	7:05

=== Special Edition ===
- The second disc includes all ten tracks from Medina's third Danish studio album, For altid.

Disc 2
No.	Title	Writer(s)	Producer(s)	Length
1.	"Synd for dig"	Medina Valbak, Rasmus Stabell, Jeppe Federspiel	Providers	3:31
2.	"For altid"	Valbak, Stabell, Federspiel	Providers	3:33
3.	"Vend om"	Valbak, Stabell, Federspiel	Providers	3:50
4.	"Kl. 10"	Valbak, Stabell, Federspiel	Providers	4:04
5.	"Lyser i mørke"	Valbak, Stabell, Federspiel, Andrina	Providers	3:47
6.	"12 dage"	Valbak, Stabell, Federspiel	Providers	4:21
7.	"Gode mennesker"	Valbak, Stabell, Federspiel	Providers	4:01
8.	"Ejer hele verden"	Valbak, Stabell, Federspiel	Providers	3:25
9.	"Har du det ligesom mig" (featuring Young)	Valbak, Stabell, Federspiel, Young	Providers	4:56
10.	"Lykkepille"	Valbak, Stabell, Federspiel	Providers	3:57
11.	"Forever" (Jean Élan Remix)	Valbak, Stabell, Federspiel, Nazerine Henderson, Engelina Andrina	Providers	6:43
12.	"Forever" (DJ Tonka's True House Mix)	Valbak, Stabell, Federspiel, Larsen, Henderson	Providers	4:32
13.	"Forever" (Tagteam Terror Remix)	Valbak, Stabell, Federspiel, Larsen, Henderson	Providers	4:38
14.	"Forever" (Svenstrup & Vendelboe Remix)	Valbak, Stabell, Federspiel, Larsen, Henderson	Providers	7:05

=== Forever 2.0 ===
- On 9 October 2012 Medina posted on her official Facebook page that she was working on an English version of "Synd for dig". The re-release will contain five new tracks: "Fool (I Feel Bad for You)", which is the English version of "Synd for dig", "I'm Waiting", "Perfect Drug" and two collaborations, one being "Junkie" a collaboration with Danish producer duo Svenstrup & Vendelboe and a remix of the previous released single "Happening" which features American R&B recording artist Lloyd.

Forever
No.	Title	Writer(s)	Producer(s)	Length
1.	"Fool (I Feel Bad for You)"	Medina Valbak, Rasmus Stabell, Jeppe Federspiel, Ross Golan	Providers	3:29
2.	"Forever"	Valbak, Stabell, Federspiel, Nazerine Henderson, Engelina Andrina	Providers	3:32
3.	"Butterflies"	Valbak, Stabell, Federspiel, Michelle Bell	Providers	3:42
4.	"Scars"	Valbak, Alexander James, Stabell, Federspiel	Providers	3:39
5.	"I'm Waiting"	Valbak, Stabell, Federspiel, Andrina		3:47
6.	"Happening"	Valbak, Stabell, Federspiel, Golan	Providers	4:03
7.	"Boring (It's Too Late)"	Valbak, James, Stabell, Federspiel	Providers	4:03
8.	"Hotels"	Valbak, Stabell, Federspiel, Bell	Providers	3:30
9.	"Good to You"	Valbak, Stabell, Federspiel, Bell, Theis Andersen	Providers	4:02
10.	"Junkie" (featuring Svenstrup & Vendelboe)	Valbak, Andrina, Kaspar Svenstrup, Thomas Vendelboe	Svenstrup & Vendelboe	3:49
11.	"Close to Nothing"	Valbak, Stabell, Federspiel	Providers	3:52
12.	"Keep Me Hangin'"	Tim McEwan, Valbak	DEEKAY	3:20
13.	"Black Lights"	Valbak, Stabell, Federspiel, Henderson, Andrina	Providers	3:45
14.	"Waiting for Love"	McEwan, Johannes Jørgensen, Lesley Roy	DEEKAY	4:00
15.	"Like You Hurt Me"	McEwan, Valbak	DEEKAY	3:41
16.	"Threesome"	Valbak, Stabell, Federspiel	Providers	3:41
17.	"Perfect Drug"	Valbak, Golan, Stabell, Federspiel	Providers	3:56
18.	"Happening" (featuring Lloyd) (bonus track)	Valbak, Stabell, Federspiel, Golan	Providers	4:02

=== US version ===
- On 10 December 2013 Forever was released in the US by Ultra Records. This release contains fourteen tracks of the album Forever 2.0 and a new track "Afraid", which is the English version of the song "Har du glemt".

US version
No.	Title	Writer(s)	Producer(s)	Length
1.	"Fool (I Feel Bad for You)"	Medina Valbak, Rasmus Stabell, Jeppe Federspiel, Ross Golan	Providers	3:29
2.	"Forever"	Valbak, Stabell, Federspiel, Nazerine Henderson, Engelina Andrina	Providers	3:32
3.	"Junkie" (featuring Svenstrup & Vendelboe)	Valbak, Andrina, Kaspar Svenstrup, Thomas Vendelboe	Svenstrup & Vendelboe	3:49
4.	"Butterflies"	Valbak, Stabell, Federspiel, Michelle Bell	Providers	3:42
5.	"Scars"	Valbak, Alexander James, Stabell, Federspiel	Providers	3:39
6.	"I'm Waiting"	Valbak, Stabell, Federspiel, Andrina		3:47
7.	"Happening"	Valbak, Stabell, Federspiel, Golan	Providers	4:03
8.	"Boring"	Valbak, James, Stabell, Federspiel	Providers	4:03
9.	"Hotels"	Valbak, Stabell, Federspiel, Bell	Providers	3:30
10.	"Good to You"	Valbak, Stabell, Federspiel, Bell, Theis Andersen	Providers	4:02
11.	"Keep Me Hangin'"	Tim McEwan, Valbak	DEEKAY	3:20
12.	"Waiting for Love"	McEwan, Johannes Jørgensen, Lesley Roy	DEEKAY	4:00
13.	"Afraid"	Valbak, Stabell, Federspiel, Cozi, Nina Woodford	Providers	4:22
14.	"Perfect Drug"	Valbak, Golan, Stabell, Federspiel	Providers	3:56
15.	"Happening" (featuring Lloyd) (bonus track)	Valbak, Stabell, Federspiel, Golan	Providers	4:02

Notes

- "Forever" is the English version of "For altid".
- "Happening" is the English version of "Kl. 10".
- "Black Lights" is the English version of "Lyser i mørke".
- "Fool (I Feel Bad for You)" is the English version of "Synd for dig".
- "I'm Waiting" is the English version of "Jeg venter".
- "Perfect Drug" is the English version of "Lykkepille".
- "Afraid" is the English version of "Har du glemt".

== Charts ==
Chart (2012)	Peak position
Austrian Albums (Ö3 Austria)	39
Danish Albums (Hitlisten)	5
German Albums (Offizielle Top 100)	8
Swiss Albums (Schweizer Hitparade)	13

== Release history ==
Region	Date	Format(s)	Label	Edition(s)
Austria	1 June 2012	CD, digital download	EMI	Standard, Special Edition
Denmark	1 June 2012	CD, digital download	Labelmade	Standard, Special Edition
Germany	1 June 2012	CD, digital download	EMI	Standard, Special Edition
Switzerland	1 June 2012	CD, digital download	EMI	Standard, Special Edition
Austria	7 December 2012	CD, digital download	EMI	Forever 2.0 (re-release)
Germany	7 December 2012	CD, digital download	EMI	Forever 2.0 (re-release)
Switzerland	7 December 2012	CD, digital download	EMI	Forever 2.0 (re-release)
Denmark	7 January 2013	CD, digital download	Labelmade	Forever 2.0 (re-release)
United Kingdom	10 December 2013	Digital download	Labelmade	Forever 2.0 (re-release)
United States	10 December 2013	Digital download	Labelmade	Forever 2.0 (re-release)
