= Happening (song) =

Single by Medina

from the album Forever
- Released: 14 September 2012
- Recorded: 2012
- Genre: Electropop, R&B
- Length: 4:04 (Album Version); 3:09 (Radio Edit)
- Label: Labelmade, EMI
- Songwriter(s): Medina Valbak, Rasmus Stabell, Jeppe Federspiel, Ross Golan
- Producer(s): Providers

Medina singles chronology
"Hvad der sker her" (2012)	"Happening" (2012)	"Har du glemt" (2012)

Happening is a song by Danish singer Medina from her second English studio album Forever. The song is the English version of her Danish song "Kl. 10" from her third Danish album "For altid". It was released as the second single from the album on 14 September 2012. "Happening" was written by Medina Valbak, Rasmus Stabell, Jeppe Federspiel and Ross Golan, and was produced by the Danish producer-team Providers.

== Background and inspiration ==
In a video interview about the song Medina stated that "[...] It's about meeting someone, he is unfaithful with his girlfriend, and I'm waiting for him to break-up with her, and he keeps promising me that in 10 o'clock or in this English version it's 2 am, he's gonna break up with her, so it's basically me waiting for him to do it, so him and I can be together forever".

== Music video ==
The music video for the single was filmed in early August. The video premiered on 5 September 2012 on her official myvideo.de channel and a day later on the label's YouTube channel.

== Live performances ==
Medina performed the song on 1 September 2012 at the box fight of the world champion Felix Sturm against Daniel Gaele, that was aired live on Sat 1. She also performed the song on 15 September 2012 at the "SWR3 New Pop Festival" in Baden-Baden.

== Track listing ==
- Amazon.de digital download (Germany)
1. "Happening" (Radio Edit) – 3:09
2. "Happening" (Ronen Dahan Remix) – 5:38
3. "Happening" (Get No Sleep Collective Remix)– 5:48
- iTunes digital download
1. "Happening" (Radio Edit) – 3:09
2. "Happening" (Decalicious Remix) – 4:15
3. "Happening" (Granity Remix) – 4:02
4. "Happening" (Ronen Dahan Remix) – 5:38
5. "Happening" (Get No Sleep Collective Remix)– 5:48

== Charts ==
Chart (2012)	Peak position
Germany (GfK)	68

== Personnel ==
- Songwriting – Medina Valbak, Rasmus Stabell, Jeppe Federspiel, Ross Golan
- Production and instruments – Providers
- Vocals – Medina
- Mixing and mastering – Anders Schuman, Providers

== Release history ==
Region	Date	Format	Label
Germany Switzerland	14 September 2012	Digital download	EMI
