= DYBT (disambiguation) =

DYBT is an FM radio station in Cebu City, Philippines known as Monster BT 105.9. It may also refer to:

- Dybt vand, a 1999 Danish thriller television film
- "Dybt vand" (song), a single by Svenstrup & Vendelboe
