= Addiction (Medina song) =

Single by Medina

from the album Welcome to Medina
- Released: 1 November 2010
- Recorded: 2010
- Genre: Electropop
- Length: 3:37
- Label: EMI
- Songwriter(s): Medina Valbak, Rasmus Stabell, Jeppe Federspiel, Lisa Greene
- Producer(s): Providers

Medina singles chronology
"Lonely" (2010)	"Addiction" (2010)	"Gutter" (2011)

Music video
- "Addiction" on YouTube

"Addiction" is a song by Danish singer Medina from her international debut studio album Welcome to Medina. It was released as the third single from the album on 1 November 2010. The electropop song was written by Medina, Providers and Lisa Greene and it was produced by Providers. "Addiction" peaked at number one in Denmark, becoming Medina's fifth number-one single. In the US, the song peaked at number one on Billboard's Hot Dance Airplay chart.

== Live performances ==
Medina performed the song on DR's Sport 2010 and during the "Welcome to Medina Tour" in Germany.

== Chart performance ==
"Addiction" debuted at number 59 in Germany and stayed in the chart for nine weeks. In Denmark the song debuted at number 16 on the chart in the release week of the album Welcome to Medina due to a high number of downloads and dropped off the chart two weeks later. On December 17, 2010 "Addiction" peaked at number one in Denmark. The song has spent a total of 21 weeks on the chart, and has since been certified platinum by the International Federation of the Phonographic Industry (IFPI) for sales of 30,000 units. On the issue dated 21 May 2011, "Addiction" peaked at number one on Billboard's Hot Dance Airplay chart in the United States.

== Track listing ==
- Danish digital download
1. "Addiction" – 2:53
- Danish iTunes digital download EP - (Remixes Vol. 1)
1. "Addiction" (Rune RK Remix) – 6:21
2. "Addiction" (Traplite Remix) – 5:30
3. "Addiction" (Svenstrup & Vendelboe Remix) – 5:07
- German CD single
1. "Addiction" – 2:53
2. "The One" (Acoustic Version) – 3:55
- German digital download EP
1. "Addiction" – 3:37
2. "The One" (Acoustic Version) – 3:57
3. "Addiction" (Five Star DJ Remix) – 6:28
- US digital download
1. "Addiction" (Radio Edit) – 2:53
2. "Addiction" (Extended Version) – 5:06

== Charts ==
=== Weekly charts ===
Chart (2010–2011)	Peak position
CIS Airplay (TopHit)	194
Denmark (Tracklisten)	1
Denmark Airplay (Tracklisten)	1
Germany (GfK)	59
Latvia (European Hit Radio)	34
US Hot Dance Airplay (Billboard)	1

=== Year-end charts ===
Chart (2010)	Position
Denmark (Tracklisten)	29
Chart (2011)	Position
Denmark (Tracklisten)	43

== Certifications ==
Region	Certification	Certified units/sales
Denmark (IFPI Danmark)	Platinum	30,000^{^}
^{^} Shipments figures based on certification alone.

== Release history ==
Region	Date	Format	Label	Ref.
Denmark	1 November 2010	Digital download	Labelmade, At:tack Music	
Germany	26 November 2010	CD single, digital download	EMI	
United States	5 April 2011	Digital download	Ultra Records	
