= Junkie =

Junkie, a term often used as a pejorative referring to a person with a drug addiction, mainly heroin dependence, it may also refer to:

- Junkie (novel), a 1953 novel by William S. Burroughs
- The Junkies, or The Sports Junkies, a radio program

== Songs ==
- "Junkie" (song), by Medina, 2013
- "Junky" (song), by Brockhampton, 2017
- "Junkie", by James from Pleased to Meet You, 2001
- "Junkie", by Kelis from Wanderland, 2001
- "Junkie", by Ozzy Osbourne from Down to Earth, 2001
