= For altid (album) =

Studio album by Medina
- Released: 19 September 2011
- Recorded: 2011
- Genres: Electropop; dance-pop
- Length: 46:35
- Label: Labelmade / A:larm / Universal Music
- Producers: Medina & Providers

Medina chronology
Welcome to Medina (2010)	For altid (2011)	Forever (2012)

Singles from For altid
- 1. "For altid" Released: May 30, 2011; 2. "Synd for dig" Released: September 19, 2011; 3. "Kl. 10" Released: October 31, 2011; 4. "12 dage" Released: March 26, 2012; 5. "Lyser i mørke" Released: July 12, 2012; 6. "Har du glemt" Released: October 29, 2012

Professional ratings
Review scores
Source	Rating
Berlingske Tidende	4/6 stars
Dagbladet Information	(medium)
Ekstra Bladet	2/6 stars
Gaffa	2/6 stars
Jyllands-Posten	4/6 stars
Politiken	3/6 stars
Soundvenue	2/6 stars

For altid (Forever) is the fourth studio album released by Danish singer Medina. It was released in Denmark on 19 September 2011 through Labelmade, A:larm and Universal Music, peaking at number 2 on the Danish Albums Chart. Three singles of this album have peaked at number 1 on the Danish Singles Chart, and the other singles were all in the top ten.

== Singles ==
"For altid" was released on 30 May 2011 as the lead single from the album. It peaked on number 1 for five consecutive weeks on the Danish Singles Chart and was certified platinum. "Synd for dig" was released on 19 September 2011 as the second single from the album. It peaked on number 1 on the Danish Singles Chart and was also certified platinum. "Kl. 10" was released on 31 October 2011 as the third single from the album. It peaked on number 1 for five consecutive weeks on the Danish Singles Chart. "12 dage" was released as the fourth single on 26 March 2012. It peaked on number 8 on the Danish Singles Chart being the first single of the album to not reach number one. "Lyser i mørke" was released on 12 July 2012 as the fifth single from the album. The video for the song was filmed in early June 2012, and premiered the same day of the release of this single. It peaked on number 5 on the Danish Single Charts and was certified gold. "Har Du Glemt" was released as the first single of the re-release of "For Altid" and the sixth single overall. It peaked on number 4 on the Danish Single Charts.

== Track listing ==
Standard listing
No.	Title	Length
1.	"Synd for dig"	3:29
2.	"For altid"	3:32
3.	"Vend om"	3:50
4.	"Kl. 10"	4:04
5.	"Lyser i mørke"	3:47
6.	"12 dage"	4:20
7.	"Gode mennesker"	4:01
8.	"Ejer hele verden"	3:25
9.	"Har du det ligesom mig" (featuring Young)	4:56
10.	"Lykkepille"	3:56

=== Special Edition ===
The album was re-released as a "Special Edition" on October 29, 2012. The release contains all tracks of the standard edition and additional 11 new tracks, four of them being new recorded songs, Lågsus a song by Danish hip-hop group Specktors in which Medina is featured, five remixes of the singles and a remix of "Jeg Venter".

Special Edition listing
No.	Title	Length
11.	"Jeg venter"	3:48
12.	"Har du glemt"	4:25
13.	"Hvis bare" (featuring Skinz)	4:47
14.	"En nat"	4:16
15.	"Lågsus" (Spektors featuring Medina)	3:33
16.	"For altid" (Svenstrup & Vendelboe Remix)	7:07
17.	"Synd for dig" (ELOQ Remix featuring Kidd)	3:37
18.	"Kl. 10" (Granity Remix)	4:03
19.	"12 dage" (Eagerstunn Remix)	4:11
20.	"Lyser i mørke" (The Eclectic Moniker Remix)	3:35
21.	"Jeg venter" (Odd Collection Remix)	3:18

== Chart performance ==
The album entered the charts on September 23, 2011, at number 3. The next week it reached its peak-position on number 2, where it stayed for one week. After 54 consecutive weeks the album drop-off the charts. It re-entered the charts on November 9, 2012, after the release of the Special edition of "For Altid" on number 6. As of December 21, 2012 the album sold more than 30,000 copies in Denmark, thus being certified platinum.

== Charts and certifications ==
=== Charts ===
Chart (2011)	Peak position
Danish Albums Chart	2

=== Year-end charts ===
Chart (2011)	Position
Danish Albums Chart	16

=== Certifications ===
Region	Certification	Certified units/sales
Denmark (IFPI Danmark)	3× Platinum	60,000^{‡}
^{‡} Sales+streaming figures based on certification alone.

== Release history ==
Region	Date	Format(s)	Label	Edition(s)
Denmark	September 19, 2011	CD, digital download	Labelmade / A:larm / Universal Music	Standard
Germany	June 1, 2012 (as part of "Forever (Special Edition)")	CD, digital download	EMI	Forever (Special Edition)
Denmark	October 29, 2012	CD, digital download	Labelmade / A:larm / Universal Music	For Altid (Special Edition)
