= Forever (Medina song) =

Single by Medina

from the album Forever
- Released: 13 April 2012
- Genre: Electropop, dance-pop
- Length: 3:31
- Label: EMI
- Songwriter(s): Medina Valbak, Rasmus Stabell, Jeppe Federspiel, Engelina Andrina, Nazerine Henderson
- Producer(s): Providers

Medina singles chronology
"12 dage" (2012)	"Forever" (2012)	"Lyser i mørke" (2012)

Alternative cover
- Danish/US cover

"Forever" is a song by Danish electropop singer Medina from her second English-language album Forever. The song was released as the album's lead single on 13 April 2012. "Forever" was translated into English from Medina's Danish number-one single "For altid". It samples the song "The One". In the original Danish-language version "For altid" her song "Vi to" is sampled. "Forever" was written by Medina, Providers, Engelina Andrina, and Nazerine Henderson. It was produced by Providers.

== Music video ==
The music video was shot in New York and was directed by Michael Sauer Christensen. The video premiered on 7 May 2012 on her official myvideo.de channel and a day later on the labels YouTube channel.

== Track listing ==
- Digital download
1. "Forever" – 3:31
- Digital EP
1. "Forever" – 3:33
2. "Forever" (Jean Elan Remix) – 6:44
3. "Forever" (DJ Tonka's True House Mix) – 4:31
4. "Forever" (Tagteam Terror Remix) – 4:36
- US digital download — remixes (part 1)
1. "Forever" (Tagteam Terror Remix) – 4:37
2. "Forever" (Jean Elan Radio Mix) – 3:33
3. "Forever" (Jean Elan Remix) – 6:44
4. "Forever" (DJ Tonka's True House Radio Mix) – 3:15
5. "Forever" (DJ Tonka's True House Mix) – 4:32
6. "Forever" (Svenstrup & Vendelboe Remix) – 7:06
- US digital download — remixes (part 2)
1. "Forever" (Trentemøller Remix) – 5:50
2. "Forever" (Morten Breum Remix) – 6:28
3. "Forever" (Roger Sanchez & S.co Remix) – 6:16

== Charts ==
Chart (2012)	Peak position
Austria (Ö3 Austria Top 40)	19
CIS Airplay (TopHit)	182
Germany (GfK)	21
Latvia (European Hit Radio)	26
Poland (Dance Top 50)	41
Switzerland (Schweizer Hitparade)	15

== Release history ==
Region	Date	Format(s)	Label	Ref.
Austria	13 April 2012	Digital download	EMI	
Germany	13 April 2012	Digital download	EMI	
Switzerland	13 April 2012	Digital download	EMI	
Austria	18 May 2012	CD single	EMI	
Germany	18 May 2012	CD single	EMI	
Switzerland	18 May 2012	CD single	EMI	
Denmark	21 May 2012	Digital download	Labelmade	
United States	26 June 2012	Digital download	Ultra Records	
United States	21 August 2012	Digital download — remixes (part 1)	Ultra Records	
United States	30 October 2012	Digital download — remixes (part 2)	Ultra Records	
