= Giv Slip =

Single by Medina
- Released: 25 August 2014
- Recorded: 2014
- Genre: Pop
- Length: 3:18
- Label: Labelmade, A:larm, Universal Music
- Songwriter(s): Mads Møller, Thor Nørgaard, Medina

Medina singles chronology
| "Strip Pt. 1" (2014) | "Giv Slip" (2014) | "Når intet er godt nok" (2014) |

"Giv Slip" is a song performed by Danish pop, dance and R&B singer and songwriter Medina. It was released on 25 August 2014 as a digital download in Denmark. The song peaked at number 1 on the Danish Singles Chart.

An English version titled "Let Go" was included on her English album, We Survive (2016).

== Music video ==
A music video to accompany the release of "Giv Slip" was first released onto YouTube on 25 August 2014 at a total length of three minutes and twenty-four seconds.

== Track listing ==
Digital download
| No. | Title | Length |
|---|---|---|
| 1. | "Giv Slip" | 3:18 |

== Chart performance ==
=== Weekly charts ===
| Chart (2014) | Peak position |
|---|---|
| Denmark (Tracklisten) | 1 |

== Release history ==
| Region | Date | Format | Label |
|---|---|---|---|
| Denmark | 25 August 2014 | Digital download | Labelmade, A:larm, Universal Music |
