= Har du glemt =

Single by Medina

from the album For altid
- Released: 29 October 2012
- Recorded: 2012
- Genre: Electropop, dance-pop
- Length: 4:25
- Label: Labelmade, A:larm, Universal Music
- Songwriter(s): Jeppe Federspiel, Rasmus Stabell, Medina

Medina singles chronology
"Happening" (2012)	"Har du glemt" (2012)	"Boring (It's Too Late)" (2013)

"Har du glemt" (English: Have you forgotten) is a song performed by Danish pop, dance and R&B singer and songwriter Medina. It was released on 29 October 2012 as a digital download in Denmark. The song was released as the first single of the re-release of For altid. The song peaked at number 4 on the Danish Singles Chart.

== Track listing ==
Digital download
No.	Title	Length
1.	"Har du glemt"	4:25

== Chart performance ==
=== Weekly charts ===
Chart (2012)	Peak position
Denmark (Tracklisten)	4

== Release history ==
Region	Date	Format	Label
Denmark	29 October 2012	Digital download	Labelmade, A:larm, Universal Music
