= Når intet er godt nok =

Single by Medina
- Released: 8 November 2014
- Recorded: 2014
- Genre: Pop
- Length: 3:27
- Label: Labelmade, Universal Music
- Songwriter(s): Mads Møller, Thor Nørgaard, Medina

Medina singles chronology
"Giv Slip" (2014)	"Når intet er godt nok" (2014)	"We Survive" (2016)

"Når intet er godt nok" is a song performed by Danish pop, dance and R&B singer and songwriter Medina. It was released on 8 November 2014 as a digital download in Denmark. The song peaked at number 1 on the Danish Singles Chart.

An English version titled "Good Enough" was included on her English album, We Survive (2016).

== Music video ==
A music video to accompany the release of "Når Intet Er Godt Nok" was first released onto YouTube on 30 November 2014 at a total length of three minutes and forty-nine seconds.

== Track listing ==
Digital download
No.	Title	Length
1.	"Når Intet Er Godt Nok"	3:27

== Chart performance ==
=== Weekly charts ===
Chart (2014)	Peak position
Denmark (Tracklisten)	1

== Release history ==
Region	Date	Format	Label
Denmark	8 November 2014	Digital download	Labelmade, Universal Music
