= We Survive =

Studio album by Medina
- Released: 26 February 2016
- Recorded: 2015
- Genre: Electropop
- Length: 47:06
- Label: Labelmade, We Love Music, Universal
- Producer: Pitchshifters, Stannard, Howes, Gill

Medina chronology
Tæt På - Live (2014)	We Survive (2016)	Grim (2018)

Singles from We Survive
- 1. "We Survive" Released: 12 February 2016

We Survive is the third English language studio album and sixth in total by the Danish singer and songwriter Medina. It was released worldwide on 26 February 2016 by Labelmade, We Love Music and Universal. The album consists of ten original songs and three translated songs from her Danish singles, "Jalousi", "Når intet er godt nok" and "Giv Slip".

== Singles ==
The title song "We Survive" was released as the album's first single on 12 February 2016, a music video accompanies the track.

== Themes ==
Thematically the album deals with envy, love, rejection, and a sense of emptiness throughout. However other themes include embracing yourself, on tracks like Liquid Courage.

== Reception ==
We Survive received mixed reviews upon release, however there is heavy emotional lyrical content throughout the album. It was considered her darkest albums when it was released.

== Track listing ==
We Survive
No.	Title	Writer(s)	Producer(s)	Length
1.	"Runnin Out of Love"	Mads Møller, Thor Nørgaard, Medina Valbak, Lauren Seymour, Mats Lie Skåre	Pitchshifters	3:28
2.	"We Survive"	Richard "Biff" Stannard, Ash Howes, Møller, Nørgaard, Lindy Robbins, Jetta John Hartley, Valbak	Stannard, Howes	3:43
3.	"Someone New"	Jason Gill, Valbak	Gill	3:58
4.	"Jealousy"	Møller, Nørgaard, Theis Andersen, Valbak	Pitchshifters	3:43
5.	"Good Enough"	Møller, Nørgaard, Valbak	Pitchshifters	3:26
6.	"Let Go"	Møller, Nørgaard	Pitchshifters	3:17
7.	"For U"	Møller, Nørgaard, Valbak, Isa Ljunggren	Pitchshifters	3:59
8.	"Liquid Courage"	Møller, Nørgaard, Valbak, Lindy Robbins	Pitchshifters	3:44
9.	"Young in Love"	Møller, Nørgaard, Valbak, Terri Bjerre	Pitchshifters	3:46
10.	"By Your Side"	Møller, Nørgaard, Valbak	Pitchshifters	3:52
11.	"Grass"	Møller, Nørgaard, Valbak	Pitchshifters	3:22
12.	"Karma's a Bitch"	Gill, Valbak	Gill	3:27
13.	"Walking Mistake"	Møller, Nørgaard, Valbak	Pitchshifters	3:21

Notes

- "Jealousy" is the English version of "Jalousi".
- "Good Enough" is the English version of "Når intet er godt nok".
- "Let Go" is the English version of "Giv Slip".

== Charts ==
Chart (2016)	Peak position
Danish Albums (Hitlisten)	20
German Albums (Offizielle Top 100)	39
