= Hvad der sker her =

Single by Nik & Ras featuring Medina
- Released: 9 July 2012
- Recorded: 2012
- Genre: Dance, Comedy
- Length: 4:05
- Label: Immergut, Musicall, Panamericana
- Songwriter(s): Nikolaj Lie Kaas; Lasse Kramhoeft; Soeren Schou; Medina Danielle Oona Valbak; Ricco Wichmann

Nik & Ras singles chronology
"Fugt I Fundamentet" (2011)	"Hvad der sker her" (2012)

Medina singles chronology
"Lågsus" (2012)	"Hvad der sker her" (2012)	"Happening" (2012)

"Hvad der sker her" is a song performed by Danish R&B, Hip-Hop and pop duo Nik & Ras. It was released on 4 September 2012 as a digital download in Denmark on iTunes. The song features vocals from Danish pop, dance and R&B singer and songwriter Medina. The song peaked at number 5 on the Danish Singles Chart.

== Track listing ==
Digital download
No.	Title	Length
1.	"Hvad der sker her" (feat. Medina)	4:05

== Chart performance ==
Chart (2012)	Peak position
Denmark (Tracklisten)	5

== Release history ==
Region	Date	Format	Label
Denmark	4 September 2012	Digital download	Immergut, Musicall, Panamericana
