= Lonely (Medina song) =

Single by Medina

from the album Welcome to Medina
- Released: 3 September 2010
- Genre: Electropop
- Length: 3:11
- Label: EMI
- Songwriter(s): Medina Valbak, Rasmus Stabell, Jeppe Federspiel, Terri Bjerre
- Producer(s): Providers

Medina singles chronology
"Mest ondt" (2010)	"Lonely" (2010)	"Addiction" (2010)

"Lonely" is a song by Danish electropop singer Medina from her international debut album Welcome to Medina. It was released as album's second single on 3 September 2010 in Germany, Austria and Switzerland. Co-written by American singer Terri Bjerre, the song is an English version of "Ensom", which was released as the third single from Medina's second Danish studio album on 2 November 2009 in Denmark.

== Track listing ==
- German CD single
1. "Lonely" – 3:09
2. "Lonely" (Svenstrup & Vendelboe Remix) – 4:48
- German digital download
1. "Lonely" (Single Edit) – 3:12
2. "Lonely" (DBN RMX) – 5:19
3. "Lonely" (Svenstrup & Vendelboe Remix) – 4:50
4. "Lonely" (Massimo Nocito & Jewelz Remix) – 6:13
5. "Lonely" (Plastik Funk's Dirty House RMX) – 7:28
6. "Lonely" (Gooseflesh Remix) – 5:29

== Personnel ==
- Songwriting – Medina Valbak, Rasmus Stabell, Jeppe Federspiel, Terri Bjerre
- Production and instruments – Providers
- Vocals – Medina
- Mixing and mastering – Anders Schuman, Providers

== Charts ==
Chart (2010)	Peak position
Austria (Ö3 Austria Top 40)	46
Germany (GfK)	26
Latvia (European Hit Radio)	5

== Release history ==
Region	Date	Label	Format
Germany	3 September 2010	EMI	CD, digital download
Austria	3 September 2010	EMI	CD, digital download
Switzerland	3 September 2010	EMI	CD, digital download
