= Jalousi =

Single by Medina

from the album Tæt På - Live
- Released: 3 February 2014
- Recorded: 2013
- Genre: Pop
- Length: 3:41
- Label: Labelmade, A:larm, Universal Music
- Songwriter(s): Theis Andersen, Mads Møller, Thor Nørgaard, Medina
- Producer(s): Pitchshifters

Medina singles chronology
"Fool (I Feel Bad for You)" (2014)	"Jalousi" (2014)	"Strip Pt. 1" (2014)

"Jalousi" is a song performed by Danish pop, dance and R&B singer and songwriter Medina. It was released on 3 February 2014 as a digital download in Denmark as the lead single from her debut live album Tæt På - Live (2014). The song peaked at number 1 on the Danish Singles Chart.

== Music video ==
A music video to accompany the release of "Jalousi" was first released onto YouTube on 3 February 2014 at a total length of three minutes and fifty-four seconds. The video was directed by Amar & Waqas.

== Track listing ==
Digital download
No.	Title	Length
1.	"Jalousi"	3:41

== Chart performance ==
=== Weekly charts ===
Chart (2014)	Peak position
Denmark (Tracklisten)	1

== Release history ==
Region	Date	Format	Label
Denmark	3 February 2014	Digital download	Labelmade, A:larm, Universal Music
