= Arrogant (EP) =

EP by Medina
- Released: 3 February 2014
- Studio: Denmark
- Genre: Pop
- Length: 21:55
- Label: Labelmade / A:larm

Medina chronology
Tæt På - Live (2014)	Arrogant (2014)	We Survive (2016)

Singles from Arrogant
- 1. "Strip, Pt. 1" Released: 3 April 2014

Professional ratings
Review scores
Source	Rating
Gaffa	3/6 stars

Arrogant is a primarily Danish extended play released by Danish singer Medina. It was released in Denmark on 3 February 2014 on iTunes through Labelmade / A:larm. Medina announced the EP on the same day at the 2014 Zulu Awards, where she performed "Strip, Pt. 1" with rapper Kidd. Medina stated "There are many Danes who think I am arrogant, but I love myself, and why should I not allow myself to be proud of what I have achieved?" The EP is a showdown with the pop sound Medina has become known for, and according to the singer, has put her in the booth: "I've really needed it, because this is the music I come from."

== Style ==
The EP's songs show heavy use of autotune, the songs were co-written by the Danish production team Pitchshifters (Mads Møller and Thor Nørgaard), and Medina.

== Tracks ==
No.	Title	Writer(s)	Length
1.	"Arrogant" (featuring Højer Øye)	Medina Valbak, Benjamin H. Johnson, Mads Møller, Thor Nørgaard	3:27
2.	"Couchie"	Valbak, Møller, Nørgaard	2:53
3.	"Falske Mennesker" (featuring Gilli)	Valbak, Kian Rosenberg Larsen, Møller, Nørgaard	4:27
4.	"Isboks" (featuring Xander)	Valbak, Xander Linnet, Møller, Nørgaard	3:27
5.	"Strip, Pt. 1" (featuring Kidd)	Valbak, Nicholas Westwood Kidd, Møller, Nørgaard	3:40
6.	"Strip, Pt. 2" (featuring Kidd)	Valbak, Kidd, Møller, Nørgaard	4:01
Total length:			21:55

== Release history ==
Region	Date	Format(s)	Label	Edition(s)
Denmark	February 3, 2014	digital download	Labelmade / A:larm	Standard
