= Execute Me =

Single by Medina

from the album Welcome to Medina
- Released: 18 November 2011
- Recorded: 2010
- Genre: Electropop
- Length: 3:12
- Label: EMI
- Songwriter(s): Medina Valbak, Rasmus Stabell, Jeppe Federspiel, L. Greene
- Producer(s): Providers

Medina singles chronology
"Kl. 10" (2011)	"Execute Me" (2011)	"12 dage" (2012)

"Execute Me" is a song by Danish electropop singer Medina. It was released as the sixth single of the album "Welcome to Medina" on November 18, 2011. The song is written by Medina, Jeppe Federspiel, Rasmus Stabell and Lisa Greene and was produced by Providers.

== Background and inspiration ==
"Execute Me" was written by Medina, Jeppe Federspiel, Rasmus Stabell and Lisa Greene for Medinas debut international album "Welcome to Medina". About the songs inspiration Medina stated "There are moments in a relationship, when you ask yourself if the partner is the right one. When you assess that you are not happy with this relationship, you should be brave enough to end it. This step isn't easy, but in the long term you will be better. That's what the song stands for."

== Critical reception ==
Mix1.de gave the song a positive review giving the single 7 out of 8 points. CDstars.de listed the song as a play tip. Katja Scherle from laut.de gave the song a negative review stating that the song was "predictable", "unimaginative" and "sluggish".

== Music video ==
The music video was shot during concerts of the US tour, the "Welcome to Medina Tour" in Germany and on festivals in Denmark. The video premiered on 31 October 2011 on Medinas official myvideo.de channel.

== Live performances ==
Medina performed the song on the "Welcome to Medina Tour" in Germany and on her club tour in the USA. She also performed the song on selected festivals in Denmark. Medina performed the song in an unplugged version on 8 November 2011 at Sat 1 Früstücksfernsehen.

== Track listing ==
- German digital download
1. "Execute Me" - 3:36
2. "Execute Me" (Get No Sleep Collective Remix) - 5:36
3. "Execute Me" (Sola Plexus Remix Edit) - 3:37
4. "Execute Me" (Sola Plexus Remix) - 5:06
- Digital download music video
1. "Execute Me"

== Personnel ==
- Songwriting – Medina Valbak, Rasmus Stabell, Jeppe Federspiel, Lisa Greene
- Production and instruments – Providers
- Vocals – Medina
- Mixing and mastering – Anders Schuman, Providers

== Release history ==
Region	Date	Label	Format
Germany	18 November 2011	EMI Germany	Digital download
