= Gutter (song) =

Single by Medina

from the album Welcome to Medina
- Released: March 4, 2011
- Recorded: 2011
- Genre: Electropop
- Length: 3:25
- Label: Labelmade
- Songwriter(s): Medina Valbak, Rasmus Stabell, Jeppe Federspiel, Viktoria Siff Emilie Hansen
- Producer(s): Providers

Medina singles chronology
"Addiction" (2010)	"Gutter" (2011)	"Du säger du älskar mig" (2011)

Music video
- "Gutter" on YouTube

Gutter is a song by Danish singer Medina from her international debut studio album Welcome to Medina. It was released as the fourth single from the album on March 4, 2011. The electropop song was written by Medina, Providers and Viktoria Siff Emilie Hansen and it was produced by Providers. "Gutter" peaked at number eight in Denmark.

== Track listing ==
- Danish digital download
1. "Gutter" – 3:25
- Danish digital download — remixes
1. "Gutter" (Svenstrup & Vendelboe Remix) – 5:55
2. "Gutter" (Blank & Jones Club Mix) – 6:45
3. "Gutter" (Blank & Jones Dub Mix) – 6:29
4. "Gutter" (Blank & Jones Radio Edit) – 3:37
- Austrian/German/Swiss digital download
1. "Gutter" – 3:25
2. "Gutter" (Blank & Jones Club Mix) – 6:45
3. "Gutter" (Blank & Jones Radio Edit) – 3:37
4. "Gutter" (Blank & Jones Dub Mix) – 6:29
5. "Gutter" (Gabriel Schwarz Remix) – 3:29
6. "Gutter" (Svenstrup & Vendelboe Remix) – 5:55
- Austrian/German/Swiss CD single
1. "Gutter" – 3:24
2. "Gutter" (Blank & Jones Club Mix) – 6:45
- US digital download
1. "Gutter" – 3:25
2. "Gutter" (Svenstrup & Vendelboe Remix) – 5:55
3. "Gutter" (Blank & Jones Radio Edit) – 3:37
4. "Gutter" (Blank & Jones Club Mix) – 6:45
5. "Gutter" (Blank & Jones Dub Mix) – 6:29

== Charts ==
Chart (2011)	Peak position
CIS Airplay (TopHit)	204
Denmark (Tracklisten)	8
Germany (GfK)	43

== Release history ==
Region	Date	Format	Label	Ref.
Denmark	March 4, 2011	Digital download	Labelmade	
Denmark	March 4, 2011	Digital download — remixes	Labelmade	
Austria	March 18, 2011	CD single, digital download	EMI	
Germany	March 18, 2011	CD single, digital download	EMI	
Switzerland	March 18, 2011	CD single, digital download	EMI	
United States	May 17, 2011	Digital download	Ultra Records	
