= The Lazy Song =

2011 single by Bruno Mars

Single by Bruno Mars

from the album Doo-Wops & Hooligans
- Released: February 15, 2011
- Genre: Reggae; reggae-pop; ska
- Length: 3:15 (album version); 3:08 (single version)
- Label: Atlantic; Elektra
- Songwriters: Bruno Mars; Philip Lawrence; Ari Levine; K'naan
- Producer: The Smeezingtons

Bruno Mars singles chronology
"Grenade" (2010)	"The Lazy Song" (2011)	"Talking to the Moon" (2011)

Music video
- "The Lazy Song" on YouTube

"The Lazy Song" is a song by American singer-songwriter Bruno Mars for his debut studio album, Doo-Wops & Hooligans (2010). It was serviced to contemporary hit radios in the United States on February 15, 2011, as the album's third single by Atlantic and Elektra. Development of "The Lazy Song" began while Mars, Philip Lawrence and Ari Levine were hanging around the studio and did not feel like working. The trio produced the track under their alias, the Smeezingtons, and wrote the song in collaboration with rapper K'naan. Musically, "The Lazy Song" borrows "heavily from roots reggae" and compared to the reggae style of Jason Mraz, while lyrically it is an anthem to laziness.

"The Lazy Song" reached number four on the US Billboard Hot 100, while it topped the charts in Denmark and in the United Kingdom. It charted on most markets within the top five. It was certified diamond by the Recording Industry Association of America (RIAA), Music Canada (MC) and by the Syndicat national de l'édition phonographique (SNEP) . It was one of the best selling digital singles of 2011.

Cameron Duddy and Mars directed the accompanying music video, in which Mars hangs out with five dancers wearing monkey masks while jesting around in his underwear. Mars promote "The Lazy Song" on the television show American Idol and NBC's Today Show. It was sung during The Doo-Wops & Hooligans Tour (2010–12), the Hooligans in Wondaland Tour (2011), and occasionally on The Moonshine Jungle Tour (2013–14).

== Development and production ==
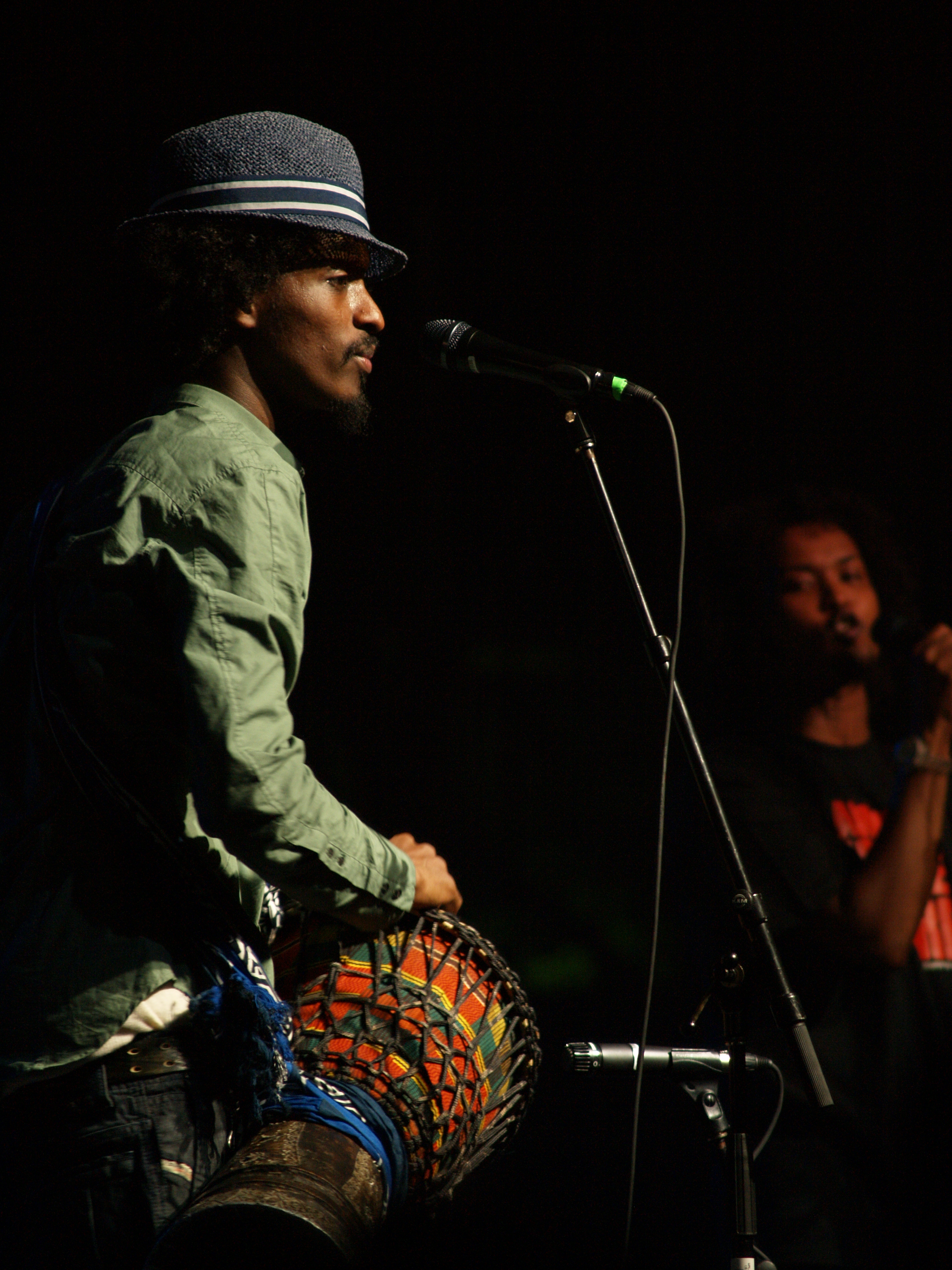
K'naan (pictured) co-wrote the track

In an interview with Sound on Sound, Ari Levine explained how they came up with the song "[It] was a very tough song to write, even though it is so simple. That song began one day when we were hanging around the studio and hadn't written a song for a few days and we were kind of burnt out and didn't feel like working. We felt lazy. 'K'naan' was in the studio with us, and the four of us suddenly came up with this idea." He added, "After that we had a really hard time getting the groove and the drums to sit right. Once you have one piece of the puzzle, like when you realise that a drum track is good, you can add other things in after that."

Bruno Mars affirmed that they were trying to be "magical and historic" thus creating a track "that was better than the Beatles". Due to the frustration of not being able to do so, Mars said "Today I don't feel like doing anything at all", which according to him was an eye-opener. In 2013, on the GQ Cover Story, the artist revealed that he did not like the song.

"The Lazy Song" was written by Mars, Philip Lawrence, Levine and K'naan, while production was handled by the former three production-team, the Smeezingtons. Levine and Mars played all the instruments on the track and recorded them. The former was also responsible for engineering the song at Levcon Studios in Los Angeles, California. Jash Negandhi (DJ Dizzy) was responsible for the scratching on the track. The single was mixed at Larrabee Sound Studios in Los Angeles, California by Manny Marroquin, while Christian Plata and Erik Madrid served as the assistants for mix. It was mastered by Stephen Marcussen at Marcussen Mastering in Hollywood, California.

== Composition ==
The Lazy Song
An 18-second sample of the song features Mars singing over a moderate reggae beat.

"The Lazy Song" is a reggae, reggae-pop and ska track, borrowing "heavily from roots reggae". According to the digital sheet music published by Alfred Music Publishing, the song was written in the key of B major and is set in time signature of common time with a tempo of 88 beats per minute. "The Lazy Song" instrumentation features scratching and a drum beat. Its production has been compared to the reggae style of Jason Mraz and Sugar Ray. Tim Sendra of AllMusic said it was one of the tracks from Doo-Wops & Hooligans that captured the laid-back groove.

Lewis Corner, reviewer of Digital Spy wrote that "Bruno pulls a sickie in this reggae-pop number about, well, absolutely nothing." Corner described Mars as a "couch potato of the daytime TV variety" due to the lyrics of the song "I'm gonna kick my feet up then stare at the fan/ Turn the TV on, throw my hand in my pants". Lyrically, the song makes reference to MTV, the P90X home fitness DVDs, and the Cali Swag District song "Teach Me How to Dougie" (2010). Eric Henderson of Slant Magazine noted the lyrics "paints a portrait of Al Bundy as a young man". The Scotsman considered the song a "celebration of head-in-the-sand idleness and irresponsibility". Similarly, Jim Farber of Daily News dubbed it a "hymn to sloth". The single version of the song is three minutes and eight seconds and features whistling, which is not present on the album version, which is three minutes and fifteen seconds.

== Release ==
"The Lazy Song" was the third single to be released from Mars's debut studio album Doo-Wops & Hooligans (2010). Atlantic and Elektra Records released the song, initially for airplay on contemporary hit radio in the United States, on February 15, 2011. On April 22, the single was issued for radio airplay in Italy by Warner Music Group.

On May 8 and 9, 2011, the single was released in the UK via digital download and as a CD single, respectively, containing both the single edit version and The Hooligans remix of "Grenade", by Warner Music Group. On February 18, 2011, it was released via digital download in New Zealand, containing the single version of the song. On May 27, 2011, a CD single was released on Germany, Austria and Switzerland.

== Critical reception ==
"The Lazy Song" has received generally positive reviews from contemporary music critics. Tony Clayton-Lea of The Irish Times highlighted "The Lazy Song" as one of the best tracks on the album, placing it firmly on his download list. Sean Fennessey of The Washington Post praised the song’s irresistible charm, calling its tone “endearing” and emotionally rich, and commending Mars for striking that delicate balance so artfully. Lewis Corner of Digital Spy described the song as a breezy, summery ditty that's "head-boppable"—a light, playful track perfectly suited to Mars’s relaxed, carefree vibe; he gave it three out of five stars, acknowledging its fun and easygoing appeal. Blues & Soul magazine noted the reggae-tinged influence, celebrating its laid-back groove and saying that, while deceptively simple, the song shines in its nostalgic, feel-good sensibility. Andy Gill of The Independent appreciated the track as a "laidback acoustic groove" with a subtle reggae-lite gloss, applauding its mellow instrumentation and relaxed atmosphere. Entertainment Weekly's Leah Greenblatt observed that The Lazy Song uniquely suits Mars’s strengths—its easy, casual tone feels perfectly natural coming from him, highlighting his charming, unforced delivery.

Alexis Petridis of The Guardian, gave the song a negative review, writing that "The Lazy Song" "gets no further than the second verse before Mars – nothing if not keen to keep his fans abreast of his every activity in a world of 360-degree connectivity – announces that he's planning on having a wank".

=== Accolades ===
In 2011, the song received a nomination at the MP3Music Awards for "The BNC Award Best/New/Act", but lost. It also received a nomination for the Choice Summer Song award at the 2011 Teen Choice Awards. In 2011, the song was nominated at the NRJ Music Awards and Billboard Music Awards for, respectively, International Song of the Year and Top Streaming Song (Video). In 2012, at the ASCAP Pop Music Awards, "The Lazy Song" was one of the winners of Most Performed Songs, and at the RTHK International Pop Poll Awards won "Top 10 Gold International Gold Songs". The song, according to Spotify and 300,000 users, was considered a "Hangover Cure".

== Commercial performance ==
"The Lazy Song" spent a total of 27 weeks on the US Billboard Hot 100 chart and peaked at number four. It also peaked at number three on Billboard's Pop Songs chart and at number two on the Adult Top 40 chart. The single sold over 1 million digital copies in the United States in May 2011, becoming Mars's fifth consecutive million-selling single as a solo and featured artist combined. The song has sold 3,262,000 digital copies in the United States as of September 2012. It has been certified Diamond by the Recording Industry Association of America (RIAA). The song rose to number 5 on the Canadian Hot 100 chart, having started at number 85 on March 19, 2011. It was certified diamond by Music Canada (MC).

In New Zealand, it debuted at number eighteen on the New Zealand Singles Chart and peaked at number three. It was certified four times platinum by the Recorded Music NZ (RMNZ). It entered the Australian ARIA Singles Chart at number ten on February 28, 2011, and eventually reached number six. It was certified five times platinum by the Australian Recording Industry Association (ARIA). In the United Kingdom, "The Lazy Song" peaked at the top of the UK Singles Chart, becoming Mars's third solo chart-topping song in under a year following "Just the Way You Are" and "Grenade". The song has sold 747,000 copies in the United Kingdom as of October 2016 and was certified three times platinum by the British Phonographic Industry (BPI).

The single debuted at number 18 on the Denmark and peaked at number one. In Germany it reached number nine. "The Lazy Song" started at number 26 in the Dutch Top 40 on April 2, 2011, and peaked at number four in its eighth week on the chart. The single debuted at number ten on the Ö3 Austria Top 40 and peaked at number four. In Switzerland it entered the singles chart at number 29 and climbed to number nine. In Italy, it peaked at number ten in the FIMI Singles Chart Italy and was certified double platinum by the Federazione Industria Musicale Italiana (FIMI). In France, the single was certified diamond by Syndicat national de l'édition phonographique (SNEP), despite peaking at number 11. It was one of the best selling digital singles of 2011 with sales of 6.5 million copies.

== Music videos ==
=== Background and development ===
Mars was able to watch the video his label had produced for the song prior to the release of Doo-Wops & Hooligans. Finding that it did not represent the song the way he wanted, the singer asked the label to record another. The latter agreed and gave him a "couple thousand dollars" to do so. With it, Mars bought chimpanzee masks and shot the video in two days in Los Angeles, California. After filming 12 takes, the tenth was the one chosen. Presented as a one shot video, it was directed by Mars and Cameron Duddy. American dance group Poreotics appear in the video as the masked dancers.

=== Synopsis ===
Mars and the Poreotics in a shot from the official music video.

The video opens with Mars sporting black sunglasses and a flannel shirt, singing and hanging out in a bedroom with five similarly-dressed dancers wearing chimpanzee masks. While Mars sings about what he feels like doing on a day off, he and the dancers perform boy-band-reminiscent dance moves and fool around in mimicry of the song's lyrics. Fellow Smeezingtons member Philip Lawrence makes a cameo appearance, lip-syncing the line "Oh my God, this is great!", before being driven off by the dancers. When Mars sings "I'll just strut in my birthday suit/and let everything hang loose!", they drop their pants. The video ends with him pouring yellow confetti over the dancers then striking a pose together with them, and the returned Lawrence, for the camera.

=== Reception ===
The music video was nominated at the 2011 MTV Video Music Awards for Best Choreography. The UK Music Video Awards also recognized it with a nomination in the "Best Pop Video – UK" category at the 2011 ceremony. The music video was nominated at the Myx Music Awards 2012 for Favorite International Video. As of September 2025, the music video has received over 3 billion views on YouTube.

=== Alternate version ===
An alternate music video, directed by Nez and produced by Anne Johnson, was released in May 2011. It features Leonard Nimoy wearing a bathrobe and slippers all day, "enjoy[ing] the lazy life". He is seen wandering around the neighborhood, visiting the supermarket for "jello and milk", and flipping off his neighbours. Mars and Lawrence make a cameo in the video, walking out of the grocery store as Nimoy walks in. Nimoy's Star Trek castmate William Shatner also makes a brief appearance.

== Live performances and other media ==
It was first performed live on Kidd Kraddick, on October 19, 2010. On October 22, 2010, a "soulful" arrangement of the song was sung for a Billboard Tastemakers video session. On April 28, 2011, he performed the song on the tenth season of American Idol. Mars also performed it at the NBA All-Star Tip Off Pre-Show in February 2011. The song was also performed on NBC's Today Show on June 24, 2011. According to MTV's Dannielle Genet, the singer "really got the crowd amped" during the performance of the track. On June 28 of that year Mars performed in the X Factor finale of France with the two finalists. On July 27, 2011, he performed the song at KIIS FM.

It was the seventh song of his debut world tour, The Doo-Wops & Hooligans Tour (2010), the eight song on the Hooligans in Wondaland Tour (2011), and it was performed in Australia, Asia and on the second North America leg of his world tour, The Moonshine Jungle Tour (2013–14). Occasionally, Mars would perform a more upbeat, ska punk version of the song.

In 2020, American singer-songwriter Bennett covered "The Lazy Song" as part of the tenth anniversary of Mars's debut album.

== Track listing ==
Digital download
No.	Title	Length
1.	"The Lazy Song" (Single Version)	3:08

CD Single
No.	Title	Length
1.	"The Lazy Song" (Album Version)	3:15
2.	"Catch a Grenade" (The Hooligans Remix)	3:30

== Personnel ==
Credits adapted from the liner notes of Doo-Wops & Hooligans.

- Bruno Mars – lead vocals, instrumentation, songwriting
- Philip Lawrence – songwriting
- Ari Levine – songwriting, instrumentation, engineer
- K'naan – songwriting
- The Smeezingtons – production
- Jash Negandhi (DJ Dizzy) – scratching
- Manny Marroquin – mixing
- Christian Plata – mixing assistant
- Erik Madrid – mixing assistant
- Stephen Marcussen – mastering

== Charts ==
=== Weekly charts ===
Chart performance for "The Lazy Song"
Chart (2011)	Peak position
Australia (ARIA)	6
Austria (Ö3 Austria Top 40)	4
Belgium (Ultratop 50 Flanders)	4
Belgium (Ultratop 50 Wallonia)	7
Brazil (Billboard Brasil Hot 100)	55
Canada Hot 100 (Billboard)	5
Canada AC (Billboard)	2
Canada CHR/Top 40 (Billboard)	6
Canada Hot AC (Billboard)	2
Czech Republic Airplay (ČNS IFPI)	1
Denmark (Tracklisten)	1
Finland (Suomen virallinen lista)	14
France (SNEP)	11
Germany (GfK)	9
Hungary (Rádiós Top 40)	1
Hungary (Single Top 40)	7
Iceland (RÚV)	23
Ireland (IRMA)	4
Israel International Airplay (Media Forest)	2
Italy (FIMI)	10
Mexico (Billboard Ingles Airplay)	14
Netherlands (Dutch Top 40)	4
Netherlands (Single Top 100)	11
New Zealand (Recorded Music NZ)	3
Poland Airplay (ZPAV)	2
Portugal Digital Songs Sales (Billboard)	8
Scottish Singles Sales (Official Charts)	3
Slovakia Airplay (ČNS IFPI)	1
Spain (Promusicae)	21
Sweden (Sverigetopplistan)	19
Switzerland (Schweizer Hitparade)	9
UK Singles (Official Charts)	1
UK Hip Hop/R&B (Official Charts)	1
US Billboard Hot 100	4
US Adult Contemporary (Billboard)	13
US Adult Pop Airplay (Billboard)	2
US Hot Latin Songs (Billboard)	34
US Pop Airplay (Billboard)	3
US Rhythmic Airplay (Billboard)	15

=== Year-end charts ===
2011 year-end chart performance
Chart (2011)	Position
Australia (ARIA)	14
Austria (Ö3 Austria Top 40)	45
Belgium (Ultratop Flanders)	17
Belgium (Ultratop Wallonia)	60
Canada (Canadian Hot 100)	17
Denmark (Tracklisten)	24
Germany (Media Control AG)	51
Hungary (Rádiós Top 40)	59
Italy (Musica e dischi)	53
Netherlands (Dutch Top 40)	21
Netherlands (Single Top 100)	26
New Zealand (Recorded Music NZ)	11
Sweden (Sverigetopplistan)	65
Switzerland (Schweizer Hitparade)	37
UK Singles (Official Charts Company)	15
US Billboard Hot 100	26
US Adult Top 40 (Billboard)	19
US Adult Contemporary (Billboard)	36
US Mainstream Top 40 (Billboard)	26

== Certifications ==
List of certifications
Region	Certification	Certified units/sales
Australia (ARIA)	5× Platinum	350,000^{‡}
Austria (IFPI Austria)	Gold	15,000^{*}
Belgium (BRMA)	Gold	15,000^{*}
Canada (Music Canada)	Diamond	800,000^{‡}
Denmark (IFPI Danmark)	2× Platinum	180,000^{‡}
France (SNEP)	Diamond	333,333^{‡}
Germany (BVMI)	Gold	150,000^{^}
Italy (FIMI)	2× Platinum	100,000^{‡}
Mexico (AMPROFON)	Gold	30,000^{*}
New Zealand (RMNZ)	4× Platinum	120,000^{‡}
Spain (Promusicae)	Platinum	60,000^{‡}
Switzerland (IFPI Switzerland)	Platinum	30,000^{^}
United Kingdom (BPI)	3× Platinum	1,800,000^{‡}
United States (RIAA)	Diamond	10,000,000^{‡}
Streaming
Denmark (IFPI Danmark)	Platinum	100,000^{†}
Japan (RIAJ)	Platinum	100,000,000^{†}
^{*} Sales figures based on certification alone.^{^} Shipments figures based on certification alone.^{‡} Sales+streaming figures based on certification alone.^{†} Streaming-only figures based on certification alone.

== Release history ==
List of release history showing region(s), date(s), format(s) and label(s)
Region	Date	Format	Label	Ref.
United States	February 15, 2011	Contemporary hit radio	Atlantic; Elektra	
New Zealand	February 18, 2011	Digital download	Elektra	
Italy	April 22, 2011	Radio airplay	Warner Music Group	
United Kingdom	May 8, 2011	Digital download	Unknown	
United Kingdom	May 9, 2011	CD single	Warner	
Germany	May 27, 2011	CD single	Elektra	
Austria	May 27, 2011	CD single	Elektra	
Switzerland	May 27, 2011	CD single	Elektra	

== See also ==
- List of Billboard Hot 100 top 10 singles in 2011
- List of number-one hits of 2011 (Denmark)
- List of number-one singles of 2010 (Hungary)
- List of UK R&B Singles Chart number ones of 2011
- List of UK Singles Chart number ones of the 2010s
