= Welcome to Medina =

Studio album by Medina
- Released: 23 July 2010
- Genre: Electropop
- Labels: Parlophone, EMI, Labelmade, Ultra
- Producers: Providers (also exec.), Thomas Børresen (exec.)

Medina chronology
Velkommen til Medina (2009)	Welcome to Medina (2010)	For altid (2011)

Singles from Welcome to Medina
- 1. "You and I" Released: 3 May 2010; 2. "Lonely" Released: 3 September 2010; 3. "Addiction" Released: 26 November 2010; 4. "Gutter" Released: 18 March 2011; 5. "The One" Released: 12 August 2011; 6. "Execute Me" Released: 21 November 2011

Alternative cover
- Danish edition

Welcome to Medina is the international debut studio album by Danish electropop singer Medina. It was released on 23 July 2010 in Germany, Switzerland and Austria and 26 July 2010 in Denmark The album was preceded by the release of the lead single, "You and I", on 3 May 2010.

Welcome to Medina is the international edition of her second Danish studio album, Velkommen til Medina (2009). The album's four hit singles, "Kun for mig", "Velkommen til Medina", "Ensom" and "Vi to" have been translated into "You & I", "Welcome to Medina", "Lonely" and "The One", while the rest are new songs recorded for the international market. The album was re-released on 26 November 2010 with a new song entitled "Sundown", and a second disc containing music videos and remixes. A further version of the album was rereleased on 11 November 2011 as "Welcome to Medina (Ultimate Collection)". The release contains all the tracks from the standard and special edition, additional remixes and the two new Danish singles "For Altid" and "Synd For Dig".

== Chart performance ==
In Germany, Welcome To Medina entered the German Albums Chart at number ten. In its second week, the album rose to number nine, achieving a new peak position.

The album also charted in Austria and Switzerland peaking at number 45 and 24, respectively.

== Singles ==
"You and I" was released as the album's lead single on 21 September 2009 in the UK, where it peaked at number 39, and on 3 May 2010 in Germany, Austria and Switzerland, peaking at number 10, 25 and 30, respectively.

"Lonely" was released as the album's second single on 3 September 2010 in Germany and Austria, where it peaked at number 26 and 46, respectively.

"Addiction" is the third single of the album, released on 26 November 2010 in Germany. The song reached number 1 on the Danish Singles Chart.

"Gutter" was released as the album's fourth single on 18 March 2011 in Germany and peaked at number 43 on the German Singles Chart and at number 8 on the Danish Singles Chart.

"The One" was released as the fifth single from the album on 12 August 2011. The music video for the song premiered on 27 July 2011, and is similar to the Danish version entitled "Vi to", but with some new scenes with Medina singing in different parts. The single peaked at number 64 on the German Singles Chart.

"Execute Me" was released as the sixth and final single from the album on 11 November 2011 in Germany and Austria. The release contains the album version, two remixes and the music video, which premiered on 24 October 2011

=== Promotional singles ===
"Selfish" was released digitally in Germany on 15 October 2010 as a promotional single.

== Track listing ==
No.	Title	Writer(s)	Length
1.	"Welcome to Medina"	Medina, Rasmus Stabell, Jeppe Federspiel, Lisa Greene	3:55
2.	"You and I"	Medina, Stabell, Federspiel, Adam Powers, Julie Steincke	2:54
3.	"Addiction"	Medina, Stabell, Federspiel, Greene	3:38
4.	"Lonely"	Medina, Stabell, Federspiel, Terri Bjerre	3:11
5.	"6 AM"	Medina, Stabell, Federspiel, Bjerre	3:29
6.	"In Your Arms"	Medina, Stabell, Federspiel, Greene	3:40
7.	"Happy"	Medina, Stabell, Federspiel, Greene	3:33
8.	"The One"	Medina, Stabell, Federspiel, Bjerre	3:58
9.	"Gutter"	Medina, Stabell, Federspiel, Viktoria Siff Emilie Hansen	3:26
10.	"Selfish"	Medina, Stabell, Federspiel, Bjerre	3:46
11.	"Execute Me"	Medina, Stabell, Federspiel, Greene	3:40
12.	"You and I" (Acoustic Version)	Medina, Stabell, Federspiel, Powers, Steincke	2:57

Amazon.de bonus track
No.	Title	Length
13.	"You and I" (Deadmau5 Remix)	6:18

German iTunes Store and Spotify bonus tracks
No.	Title	Length
13.	"You and I" (Deadmau5 Remix)	6:17
14.	"You and I" (Spencer and Hill Remix)	6:19
15.	"You and I" (Plastic Funk Remix)	5:29
16.	"You and I" (Dash Berlin Radio Edit)	3:01

=== Special Edition ===
Disc 1
No.	Title	Writer(s)	Length
1.	"Welcome to Medina"	Medina, Rasmus Stabell, Jeppe Federspiel, Lisa Greene	3:55
2.	"You and I"	Medina, Stabell, Federspiel, Adam Powers, Julie Steincke	2:54
3.	"Addiction"	Medina, Stabell, Federspiel, Greene	3:38
4.	"Lonely"	Medina, Stabell, Federspiel, Terri Bjerre	3:11
5.	"6 AM"	Medina, Stabell, Federspiel, Terri Bjerre	3:29
6.	"In Your Arms"	Medina, Stabell, Federspiel, Greene	3:40
7.	"Happy"	Medina, Stabell, Federspiel, Greene	3:33
8.	"The One"	Medina, Stabell, Federspiel, Terri Bjerre	3:58
9.	"Gutter"	Medina, Stabell, Federspiel, Viktoria Siff Emilie Hansen	3:26
10.	"Selfish"	Medina, Stabell, Federspiel, Terri Bjerre	3:46
11.	"Execute Me"	Medina, Stabell, Federspiel, Greene	3:40
12.	"You and I" (Acoustic Version)	Medina, Stabell, Federspiel, Powers, Steincke	2:57
13.	"Sundown"	Medina, Stabell, Federspiel, Terri Bjerre	3:08

Disc 2
No.	Title	Length
1.	"Kun for mig"	4:15
2.	"Velkommen til Medina"	4:56
3.	"Ensom"	4:11
4.	"Vi To"	4:00
5.	"Yo Sin Ti" (You And I-Spanish Version)	4:15
6.	"You and I" (Deadmau5 Remix)	6:18
7.	"You And I" (Spencer & Hill Remix)	6:19
8.	"You And I" (Svenstrup & Vendelboe Remix)	5:04
9.	"You And I" (The Gooseflesh Remix)	5:10
10.	"Lonely" (DBN RMX)	5:18
11.	"Lonely" (Svenstrup & Vendelboe Remix)	4:50
12.	"Lonely" (Gooseflesh Remix)	5:30
13.	"Lonely" (Plastik Funk's Dirty House RMX)	7:26

=== Ultimate Collection ===
Disc 1
No.	Title	Writer(s)	Length
1.	"Welcome to Medina"	Medina, Rasmus Stabell, Jeppe Federspiel, Lisa Greene	3:55
2.	"You and I"	Medina, Stabell, Federspiel, Adam Powers, Julie Steincke	2:54
3.	"Addiction"	Medina, Stabell, Federspiel, Greene	3:38
4.	"Lonely"	Medina, Stabell, Federspiel, Terri Bjerre	3:11
5.	"6 AM"	Medina, Stabell, Federspiel, Terri Bjerre	3:29
6.	"In Your Arms"	Medina, Stabell, Federspiel, Greene	3:40
7.	"Happy"	Medina, Stabell, Federspiel, Greene	3:33
8.	"The One"	Medina, Stabell, Federspiel, Terri Bjerre	3:58
9.	"Gutter"	Medina, Stabell, Federspiel, Viktoria Siff Emilie Hansen	3:26
10.	"Selfish"	Medina, Stabell, Federspiel, Terri Bjerre	3:46
11.	"Execute Me"	Medina, Stabell, Federspiel, Greene	3:40
12.	"You and I" (Deadmau5 Remix)	Medina, Stabell, Federspiel, Powers, Steincke	6:18
13.	"Lonely" (Massimo Nocito & Jewelz Remix)	Medina, Stabell, Federspiel, Bjerre	6:12
14.	"Addiction" (FiveStarDeejays Remix)	Medina, Stabell, Federspiel, Greene	6:31
15.	"Gutter" (Blank & Jones Club Mix)	Medina, Stabell, Federspiel, Hansen	6:47
16.	"The One" (Get No Sleep Collective Remix)	Medina, Stabell, Federspiel, Bjerre	6:09
17.	"Execute Me" (Get No Sleep Collective Remix)	Medina, Stabell, Federspiel, Greene	5:37
18.	"Execute Me" (Sola Plexus Remix)	Medina, Stabell, Federspiel, Greene	5:06
19.	"You and I" (Svenstrup & Vendelboe Remix)	Medina, Stabell, Federspiel, Powers, Steincke	5:04
20.	"Lonely" (Svenstrup & Vendelboe Remix)	Medina, Stabell, Federspiel, Bjerre	4:50
21.	"Addiction" (Svenstrup & Vendelboe Remix)	Medina, Stabell, Federspiel, Greene	5:07
22.	"Gutter" (Svenstrup & Vendelboe Remix)	Medina, Stabell, Federspiel, Hansen	5:56
23.	"The One" (Svenstrup & Vendelboe Remix)	Medina, Stabell, Federspiel, Bjerre	4:42
24.	"Ensom"	Valbak, Stabell, Federspiel	4:11
25.	"Kun for mig"	Valbak, Stabell, Federspiel	4:16
26.	"Vi to"	Valbak, Stabell, Federspiel	4:01
27.	"Stikker du af"	Valbak, Stabell, Federspiel	3:23
28.	"Er du med"	Valbak, Stabell, Federspiel	5:09
29.	"For altid"	Valbak, Stabell, Federspiel	3:34
30.	"Synd for dig"	Valbak, Stabell, Federspiel	3:30
31.	"You and I" (Acoustic Version)	Medina, Stabell, Federspiel, Powers, Steincke	2:56
32.	"Sundown" (Radio Edit)	Medina, Stabell, Federspiel, Bjerre	3:10
33.	"Velkommen til Medina"	Medina, Stabell, Federspiel	4:56
34.	"Yo sin ti" (You and I - Spanish Version)	Medina, Stabell, Federspiel	4:15

== Personnel ==
- Providers – production, mixing, mastering
- Rasmus Stabell – executive producer, instruments
- Jeppe Federspiel – executive producer, instruments
- Thomas Børresen – executive producer
- Medina Valbak – vocals
- Anders Schumann – mixing, mastering

== Charts ==
Chart (2010)	Peak position
Austrian Albums (Ö3 Austria)	45
Danish Albums (Hitlisten)	11
European Top 100 Albums (Billboard)	74
German Albums (Offizielle Top 100)	9
Swiss Albums (Schweizer Hitparade)	24

== Certifications ==
Region	Certification	Certified units/sales
Denmark (IFPI Danmark)	Gold	15,000^{^}
Germany (BVMI)	Gold	100,000^{^}
^{^} Shipments figures based on certification alone.

== Release history ==
Region	Date	Label	Format	Edition	Catalog
Germany	23 July 2010	EMI	CD, digital download	Standard	5099964821924
Switzerland	23 July 2010	EMI	CD, digital download	Standard	5099964821924
Austria	23 July 2010	EMI	CD, digital download	Standard	5099964821924
Denmark	26 July 2010	At:tack Music	CD, digital download	Standard	ATTACKCD 116
Sweden	17 November 2011	EMI	CD, digital download	Standard	5099994704723
Germany	26 November 2010	EMI	CD, digital download	Special Edition	5099964821900
Switzerland	26 November 2010	EMI	CD, digital download	Special Edition	5099964821900
Austria	26 November 2010	EMI	CD, digital download	Special Edition	5099964821900
United States	6 September 2011	Ultra Records	Digital download	Standard	
Germany	18 November 2011	EMI	Digital download	Ultimate Collection	5099973086451
Switzerland	18 November 2011	EMI	Digital download	Ultimate Collection	5099973086451
Austria	18 November 2011	EMI	Digital download	Ultimate Collection	5099973086451
