= Skinz =

Danish singer

Mohamed Ahmed is a Danish singer of Somali descent who is signed to Universal Music Denmark. He has released an EP titled Byen sover aldrig and has collaborated with a number of other Danish artists, notably Danish singer Medina.

== Discography ==
=== Albums ===
Year	Album	Peak positions
Year	Album	DEN
2018	Ingen drama	4

=== EPs ===
Year	Album
2014	Byen sover aldrig

=== Singles ===
Year	Title	Peak positions	Album
Year	Title	DEN	Album
2014	"Der findes ingen" (featuring Medina)	20	Byen sover aldrig
2017	"Jeg har en pige"	9	Ingen Drama
2017	"I min zone"	27	Ingen Drama
2017	"Jaloux"	39	Ingen Drama
2018	"Malibu"	8	Ingen Drama
2018	"Ubesvaret opkald"	29	Ingen Drama
2018	"Højre og venstre" (feat. Ericka Jane)	19	Ingen Drama
2020	"Glemmer alting" (with Faustix)	19	Non-album singles
2021	"Jeg kan lide din vibe" (with Jimilian)	34	Non-album singles
2023	"Alfabet (ABC)"	38	Non-album singles
2023	"00'er pige"	21	Non-album singles
2025	"For mig selv" (featuring Jimilian)	39	Non-album singles
2025	"Åboulevarden"	13	Non-album singles

Featured in

Year	Album	Peak positions	Album
Year	Album	DEN	Album
2012	"Hvis bare" (Medina featuring Skinz)	39	Non-album release
2017	"Legende" (Gulddreng featuring Skinz)	7	Non-album release
