= Tæt på =

Studio album by Medina
- Released: 13 September 2007
- Genre: Pop, R&B
- Language: Danish
- Label: At:tack Music
- Producer: Copenhaniacs, Providers

Medina chronology
Tæt på	Velkommen til Medina

Singles from Tæt på
- 1. "Flå" Released: 2007; 2. "Et øjeblik" Released: 2007; 3. "Alene" Released: 2007; 4. "Okay" Released: 2007

Tæt på (Close by) is the debut album from Danish singer/songwriter Medina. It was released on 13 September 2007 by At:tack Music. The album was produced by two production teams: Copenhaniacs and Providers, with 11 tracks and guest appearances by rappers Joe True and Ruus, and singer Joey Moe.

== Tracks ==
No.	Title	Writer(s)	Producer	Length
1.	"Et øjeblik" (featuring Joe True)	Medina Valbak, Rasmus Stabell, Jeppe Federspiel, Tue Søborg Volder, Daniel Klein, Burhan Genc	Providers	3:18
2.	"Okay"	Valbak, Stabell, Federspiel	Providers	3:27
3.	"Føler du noget"	Valbak, Philip Dencker, Jens Lomholt, Daniel Muschinsky	Copenhaniacs	4:02
4.	"Alene"	Valbak, Stabell, Federspiel	Providers	4:17
5.	"Flå" (featuring Ruus)	Valbak, Dencker, Lomholt	Copenhaniacs	3:20
6.	"Find beatet"	Valbak, Stabell, Federspiel	Providers	3:31
7.	"Du taber mig"	Valbak, Stabell, Federspiel, Daniel Davidsen	Providers	3:50
8.	"Afklaret"	Valbak, Dencker, Lomholt, Daniel Fridell	Copenhaniacs	4:46
9.	"For hvad det er værd"	Valbak, Philip Dencker, Jens Lomholt, Muschinsky	Copenhaniacs	4:42
10.	"Jeg lever" (featuring Joey Moe)	Valbak, Stabell, Federspiel	Copenhaniacs	4:42
11.	"Vinden vender"	Valbak, Stabell, Federspiel	Providers	4:56
