= Glemmer dig aldrig =

Single by Svenstrup & Vendelboe featuring Nadia Malm

from the album Svenstrup & Vendelboe
- Released: 3 February 2012
- Recorded: 2011/12
- Genre: Dance
- Length: 3:08
- Label: Labelmade / Sony Music / Disco:wax
- Songwriter(s): Kasper Svenstrup; Thomas Vendelboe; Engelina Larsen

Svenstrup & Vendelboe singles chronology
"Dybt vand" (2011)	"Glemmer dig aldrig" (2012)

Nadia Malm singles chronology
"Dybt vand" (2011)	"Glemmer dig aldrig" (2012)	"Where Do We Go from Here" (2012)

"Glemmer dig aldrig" is a song by Danish electro, dance and house duo Svenstrup & Vendelboe, featuring vocals from Nadia Malm. It was released in Denmark as a digital download on 3 February 2012. The song peaked at number 2 on the Danish Singles Chart on its first week of release.

== Track listing ==
Digital download
No.	Title	Length
1.	"Glemmer dig aldrig" (Original)	3:08

== Chart performance ==
Chart (2012)	Peak position
Denmark (Tracklisten)	2

== Release history ==
Region	Date	Format	Label
Denmark	4 February 2011	Digital Download	Labelmade / Sony Music / Disco:wax
