= I nat =

Single by Svenstrup & Vendelboe featuring Karen

from the album Svenstrup & Vendelboe
- Released: 24 May 2010
- Recorded: 2010
- Genre: Dance
- Length: 3:04
- Label: Sony Music / Disco:wax

Svenstrup & Vendelboe singles chronology
| "I nat" (2010) | "Dybt vand" (2011) |

"I nat" is a song by Danish electro, dance and house duo Svenstrup & Vendelboe, featuring vocals from Karen. It was released in Denmark as a digital download on 24 May 2010. The song peaked at number 12 on the Danish Singles Chart.

== Music video ==
A music video to accompany the release of "I nat" was first released onto YouTube on 21 October 2010 at a total length of three minutes and forty-nine seconds. As of April 2016 it has received over 700,000 views.

== Track listing ==
Digital download
| No. | Title | Length |
|---|---|---|
| 1. | "I Nat" (Original Edit) | 3:35 |
| 2. | "I Nat" (Svenstrup & Vendelboe Club Remix) | 5:30 |
| 3. | "I Nat" (Kato Remix) | 6:05 |
| 4. | "I Nat" (Simon Gain & Anders K Remix) | 7:34 |
| 5. | "I Nat" (Dany Coast & Adam Quist Remix) | 7:33 |
| 6. | "I Nat" (DJ Aligator Remix) | 5:11 |
| 7. | "I Nat" (Jay Adams Remix) | 5:25 |

== Chart performance ==
| Chart (2010) | Peak position |
|---|---|
| Denmark (Tracklisten) | 12 |

== Release history ==
| Region | Date | Format | Label |
|---|---|---|---|
| Denmark | 24 May 2010 | Digital Download | Sony Music / Disco:wax |
