= 12 dage =

Single by Medina

from the album For altid
- Released: 26 March 2012
- Recorded: 2011
- Genre: Electropop, R&B
- Length: 4:20
- Label: Labelmade
- Songwriter(s): Jeppe Federspiel, Rasmus Stabell, Medina

Medina singles chronology
"Execute Me" (2011)	"12 dage" (2012)	"Forever" (2012)

"12 dage" is a song by Danish singer Medina from her third studio album For altid. It was released as the fourth single from the album on 26 March 2012. The song peaked at number 8 on the Danish Singles Chart.

== Music video ==
A music video to accompany the release of "12 dage" was first released onto YouTube on 26 March 2012 at a total length of four minutes and thirty-six seconds.

== Track listing ==
Digital download (Album version)

1. "12 dage" – 4:20

Digital download single

1. "12 dage" (Eaggerstunn Remix) - 4:10
2. "12 dage" (Lucas Nord Remix) - 6:45
3. "12 dage" (Dixone Remix) - 5:07

== Chart performance ==
Chart (2012)	Peak position
Denmark (Tracklisten)	8

== Release history ==
Region	Date	Format	Label
Denmark	26 March 2012	Digital download	Labelmade
