= For altid =

Single by Medina

from the album For altid
- Released: 30 May 2011
- Recorded: 2011
- Genre: Electropop, dance-pop
- Length: 3:32
- Label: Labelmade
- Songwriter(s): Jeppe Federspiel, Rasmus Stabell, Medina

Medina singles chronology
"Du säger du älskar mig" (2011)	"For altid" (2011)	"The One" (2011)

"For altid" is a song by Danish singer Medina from her third studio album For altid. It was released as the lead single from the album on 30 May 2011. "For altid" peaked at number one in Denmark, becoming Medina's sixth number-one single. The song was translated into the English song "Forever" which was released in 2012.

== Track listing ==
- Danish digital download
1. "For Altid" – 3:32
- Danish iTunes digital download EP
1. "For Altid" (Svenstrup & Vendelboe Remix Club Edit) – 7:06
2. "For Altid" (Svenstrup & Vendelboe Remix Radio Edit) – 3:20

== Charts ==
=== Weekly charts ===
Weekly chart performance for "For altid"
Chart (2011)	Peak position
Denmark (Tracklisten)	1

=== Year-end charts ===
Year-end chart performance for "For altid"
Chart (2011)	Position
Danish Singles Chart	7

== Certifications ==
Certifications for "For altid"
Country	Certification
Denmark	Platinum

== Release history ==
Release history and formats for "For altid"
Region	Date	Format	Label
Denmark	30 May 2011	Digital download	Labelmade
Germany	16 April 2012	Digital download	EMI
Various	16 April 2012	Digital download	Ultra
