= Det burde ikk være sådan her =

Single by Xander
- Released: October 2010
- Recorded: 2010
- Label: ArtPeople
- Songwriter: Xander

Music video
- "Det burde ikk være sådan her" on YouTube

"Det burde ikk være sådan her" is a Danish language debut single written and performed by Xander (full name Alexander Theo Linnet) from his album Over skyer, under vand.

"Det burde ikk være sådan her" (Danish: It Shouldn't Be Like This) was released on Artpeople label in October 2010 entering Tracklisten, the official Danish Singles Chart dated 8 October 2010, and reached the top of the chart on 31 December 2010 staying for one week. The single returned to the top of the chart once again on 7 January 2011 for one more week.

The official music video was directed by Uffe Truust Video and produced by Esben Staun-Olsen.

Peak (2010)	Highest position
Denmark (Tracklisten)	1

== Year-end charts ==
Chart (2010)	Position
Danish Singles Chart	26
Chart (2011)	Position
Danish Singles Chart	32
