= Tæt På – Live =

Live album by Medina
- Released: 17 March 2014
- Genre: Pop
- Label: Labelmade / A:larm

Medina chronology
Forever (2014)	Tæt På – Live (2014)	Arrogant (2014)

Singles from Tæt På – Live
- 1. "Jalousi" Released: 3 February 2014

Tæt På – Live is a live album released by Danish singer Medina. It was released on 17 March 2014 as a digital download in Denmark. The album peaked at number 2 on the Danish Albums Chart.

== Singles ==
"Jalousi" was released as the lead single from the album on 3 February 2014. The song peaked at number 1 on the Danish Singles Chart.

== Track listing ==
Tæt På – Live track listing
No.	Title	Length
1.	"Ensom"	4:35
2.	"Lyser i mørke"	4:36
3.	"12 dage"	4:10
4.	"Perfektion"	3:52
5.	"Vi to"	5:09
6.	"Kl. 10"	5:06
7.	"Lykkepille"	3:23
8.	"Synd for dig"	3:33
9.	"Jeg venter"	4:48
10.	"En nat"	4:46
11.	"Gode mennesker"	4:10
12.	"Har du glemt"	5:43
13.	"For altid"	9:07
14.	"Jalousi"	4:09
15.	"Kun for mig"	7:09
16.	"Jalousi" (studio recording)	3:41

== Chart performance ==
Chart performance for Tæt På – Live
Chart (2014)	Peak position
Danish Albums (Hitlisten)	2

== Release history ==
Release history and formats for Tæt På – Live
Region	Date	Format	Label
Denmark	17 March 2014	Digital download	Labelmade / A:larm
