= Junkie (song) =

Single by Medina featuring Svenstrup & Vendelboe

from the album Forever
- Released: 20 August 2013
- Recorded: 2012
- Genre: Electropop
- Length: 3:49
- Label: EMI
- Songwriter(s): Medina Valbak, Engelina Andrina, Kaspar Svenstrup, Thomas Vendelboe

Medina singles chronology
"Waiting for Love" (2013)	"Junkie" (2013)	"Fool (I Feel Bad for You)" (2014)

Svenstrup & Vendelboe singles chronology
"Hvor ondt det gør" (2013)	"Junkie" (2013)	""Dyyh Dyyh" (204)"

"Junkie" is a song performed by Danish pop, dance and R&B singer and songwriter Medina, featuring Svenstrup & Vendelboe. It was released on 20 August 2013 as a digital download in Denmark. The song was released as the fifth single from her second English-language album Forever. The song peaked at number 18 on the Danish Singles Chart.

== Track listing ==
Digital download
No.	Title	Length
1.	"Junkie" (feat. Svenstrup & Vendelboe)	3:49

== Chart performance ==
=== Weekly charts ===
Chart (2013)	Peak position
Denmark (Tracklisten)	18

== Release history ==
Region	Date	Format	Label
Denmark	20 August 2013	Digital download	EMI
