= The One (Medina song) =

Single by Medina

from the album Welcome to Medina
- Released: 15 August 2011
- Recorded: 2011
- Genre: Pop
- Length: 3:58
- Label: EMI
- Songwriter(s): Terri Bjerre, Medina Valbak, Rasmus Stabell, Jeppe Federspiel
- Producer(s): Providers

Medina singles chronology
| "For altid" (2011) | "The One" (2011) | "Synd for dig" (2011) |

The One is a song by Danish singer Medina from her international debut studio album Welcome to Medina. It was released as the fifth single from the album on 15 August 2011. The song was written by Medina, Providers and Terri Bjerre and it was produced by Providers. "The One" peaked at number 64 in Germany.

== Track listing ==
- Danish digital download
1. "The One" – 3:58

== Charts ==
| Chart (2011) | Peak position |
|---|---|
| Germany (GfK) | 64 |

== Release history ==
| Region | Date | Format | Label |
|---|---|---|---|
| Germany | 15 August 2011 | Digital download | EMI |
