= Lyser i mørke =

Single by Medina

from the album For altid
- Released: 12 July 2012
- Recorded: 2011
- Genre: Electropop, dance-pop
- Length: 3:48
- Label: Labelmade
- Songwriters: Jeppe Federspiel, Rasmus Stabell, Medina, Engelina

Medina singles chronology
| "Forever" (2012) | "Lyser i mørke" (2012) | "Lågsus" (2012) |

Lyser i mørke is a song by Danish singer Medina from her third studio album For altid. It was released as the fifth single from the album on 12 July 2012. "Lyser i Mørke" peaked at number 5 in Denmark. A music video for the song was recorded in early June 2013 and released on the same day as the single.

== Track listing ==
- Danish digital download
1. "Lyser i mørke" – 3:48

== Charts and certifications ==
=== Charts ===
| Chart (2012) | Peak position |
|---|---|
| Denmark (Tracklisten) | 5 |

=== Certifications ===
| Country | Certification |
|---|---|
| Denmark | Gold |
