= Specktors =

Danish hip hop group

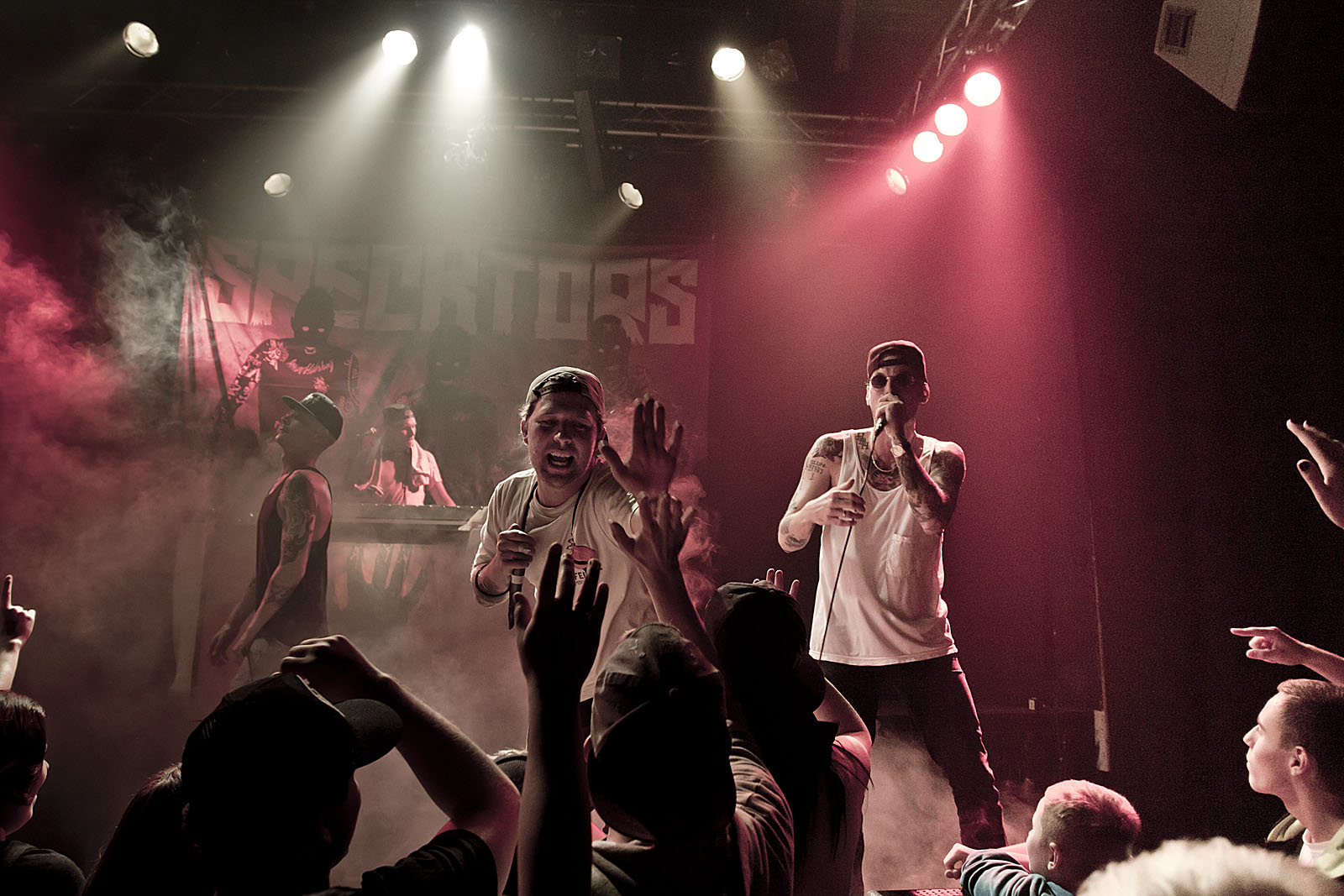

Background information
- Origin: Copenhagen, Denmark
- Genres: Hip hop
- Years active: 2008-present
- Labels: EMI Denmark
- Members: Sluzh; Jonas For Fa'en; Wanr
- Past members: Anders "Drysset" Drøidal
- Website: www.specktors.dk

Specktors is a Danish hip hop group formed in 2008 by Sluzh, Jonas For Fa'en, Wanr and Anders "Drysset" Drøidal. When Drøidal left the band, he wasn't replaced and Specktors became a trio. The band usually combines hip hop with electronic influences. The band is signed to EMI Denmark.

Specktors started working in the Copenhagen underground / club scene and in April 2008 launched a tour all over Denmark. They had their break when their song "Hellerup Ansigt // Amar Røv" was played by DJ Kjeld Tolstrup on Denmark's P3 radio program Unga Bunga. Soon after they landed a deal in 2009 with Music For Dreams label, where they released their debut album Shanksville on 9 September 2009 (090909). The album included collaborations with MagerMayn, Pato Siebenhaar, MC Ena (from Fagget Fairys) and Jokeren.

In summers of 2011 and 2012, they performed at the Roskilde Festival. In 2012, they made some mixtapes, releasing in June 2012 their second album Kadavermarch. The first track to release as a single was "Lågsus", a huge hit featuring Danish singer Medina going straight to #1 on Tracklisten, the official Danish Singles Chart.

== Discography ==
=== Albums ===
Title	Album Details	Peak chart positions
Title	Album Details	DEN
Shanksville	Released: 9 September 2009; Label: Music for Dreams; Formats: CD, digital download	—
Vi ved at du ved det	Released: 13 May 2011; Label: Self-released; Format: Digital download	—
'Kadavermarch	Released: 25 June 2012; Label: EMI Music Denmark; Formats: CD, digital download	11
4 Life	Released: 8 May 2020; Label: Warner Music; Format: Digital download, streaming	27

=== Singles ===
Year	Single	Peak position	Album
Year	Single	DEN	Album
2009	"Hellerup Ansigt // Amar Røv"	—	Shanksville
2010	"Broerne Brænder"	—	Shanksville
2010	"Længe Leve De Døde"	—	Shanksville
2012	"Bunden Op"	—	Kadavermarch
2012	"Lågsus" (featuring Medina)	1	Kadavermarch
2013	"Yndlingssang"	37	
2019	"Unz Unz" (featuring Nonsens)	12	
2020	"Gutterne" (featuring Nonsens)	12	
2022	"Lågsus for evigt" (with Tessa and TopGunn)	5	

Featured in

Year	Single	Peak position	Album
Year	Single	DEN	Album
2013	"Ejer det" (Kato featuring Specktors & Djämes Braun)	4	Non-album single
