= Lågsus =

Single by Specktors featuring Medina

from the album Kadavermarch
- Released: 9 July 2012
- Recorded: 2012
- Genre: Hip-Hop/Rap
- Length: 3:30
- Label: EMI Music

Specktors singles chronology
"Bunden Op" (2012)	"Lågsus" (2012)

Medina singles chronology
"Lyser i mørke" (2012)	"Lågsus" (2012)	"Hvad der sker her" (2012)

"Lågsus" is a song performed by Danish hip-hop group Specktors, released as the second single from their second studio album Kadavermarch (2012). It was released on 9 July 2012 as a digital download in Denmark on iTunes. The song features vocals from Danish pop, dance and R&B singer and songwriter Medina. The song peaked at number 1 on the Danish Singles Chart.

== Track listing ==
Digital download
No.	Title	Length
1.	"Lågsus" (feat. Medina)	3:30

== Chart performance ==
Chart (2012)	Peak position
Denmark (Tracklisten)	1

== Release history ==
Region	Date	Format	Label
Denmark	9 July 2012	Digital download	EMI Music
