= Nadia Malm =

Danish singer

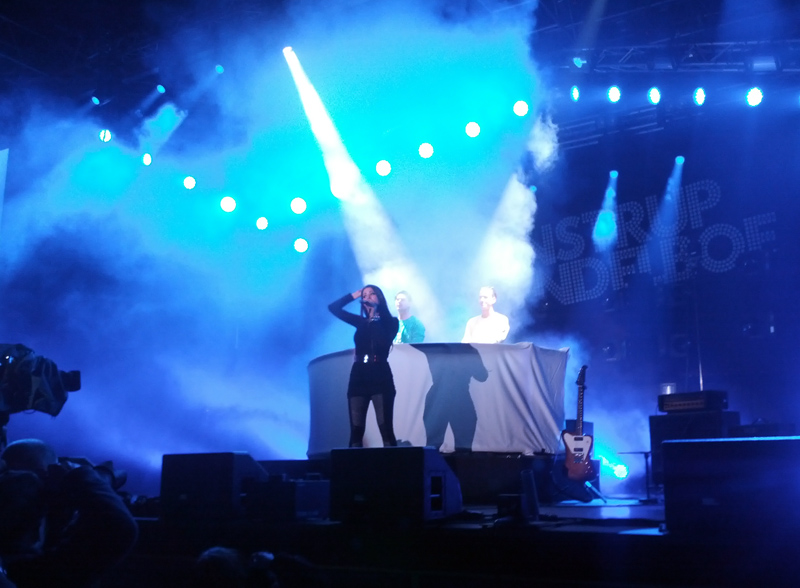
- Nadia in a concert in Fredagsrock Tivoli, 2013

Background information
- Born: Nadia Malm Hansen; 22 October 1986 (age 39); Brøndby, Denmark
- Genres: Pop, electropop
- Occupation: Singer
- Instrument: Vocals
- Years active: 2004–present
- Label: disco:wax
- Website: www.ola.cd

Nadia Malm Hansen (born 22 October 1986) better known as Nadia Malm is a Danish singer most known for her collaboration with Svenstrup & Vendelboe.

She took part in the Danish reality television show Idols in season 2 in 2004 broadcast on TV 3. She came in bottom three in week 1 of the show on 12 October 2004 and was eliminated alongside Jacob. The series was won by Rikke Emma Niebuhr.

Despite the lackluster results in Idols, she continued with a musical career. Her collaboration with Svenstrup & Vendelboe brought her a No. 1 chart-topper on the Danish Singles Chart with the single "Dybt vand" featuring Nadia Malm. This was followed by another successful single by Svenstrup & Vendelboe entitled "Glemmer dig aldrig" again featuring vocals of Nadia Malm.

== Discography ==
Featured in

Title	Year	Peak chart positions	
Title	Year	DEN	NOR
"Dybt vand" (Svenstrup & Vendelboe feat. Nadia Malm)	2011	1	1
"Glemmer dig aldrig" (Svenstrup & Vendelboe feat. Nadia Malm)	2012	1	1
"En som er din (jeg gi'r slip)"	2012	33	—
