= Synd for dig =

Single by Medina

from the album For altid
- Released: 19 September 2011
- Recorded: 2011
- Genre: Electropop, dubstep
- Length: 3:29
- Label: Labelmade
- Songwriter(s): Jeppe Federspiel, Rasmus Stabell, Medina

Medina singles chronology
"The One" (2011)	"Synd for dig" (2011)	"Kl. 10" (2011)

Synd for dig is a song by Danish singer Medina from her third studio album For altid. It was released as the second single from the album on 19 September 2011. "Synd for dig" peaked at number one in Denmark, becoming Medina's seventh number-one single.

== Track listing ==
- Danish digital download
1. "Synd For Dig" – 3:29
- Danish iTunes digital download remix
1. "Synd For Dig" (ELOQ Remix Feat. KIDD) – 3:37

== Charts and certifications ==
=== Charts ===
Chart (2011)	Peak position
Denmark (Tracklisten)	1

=== Year-end charts ===
Chart (2011)	Position
Danish Singles Chart	31

=== Certifications ===
Country	Certification
Denmark	Platinum

== Release history ==
Region	Date	Format	Label
Denmark	19 September 2011	Digital download	Labelmade
