= Xander (Danish singer) =

Danish singer

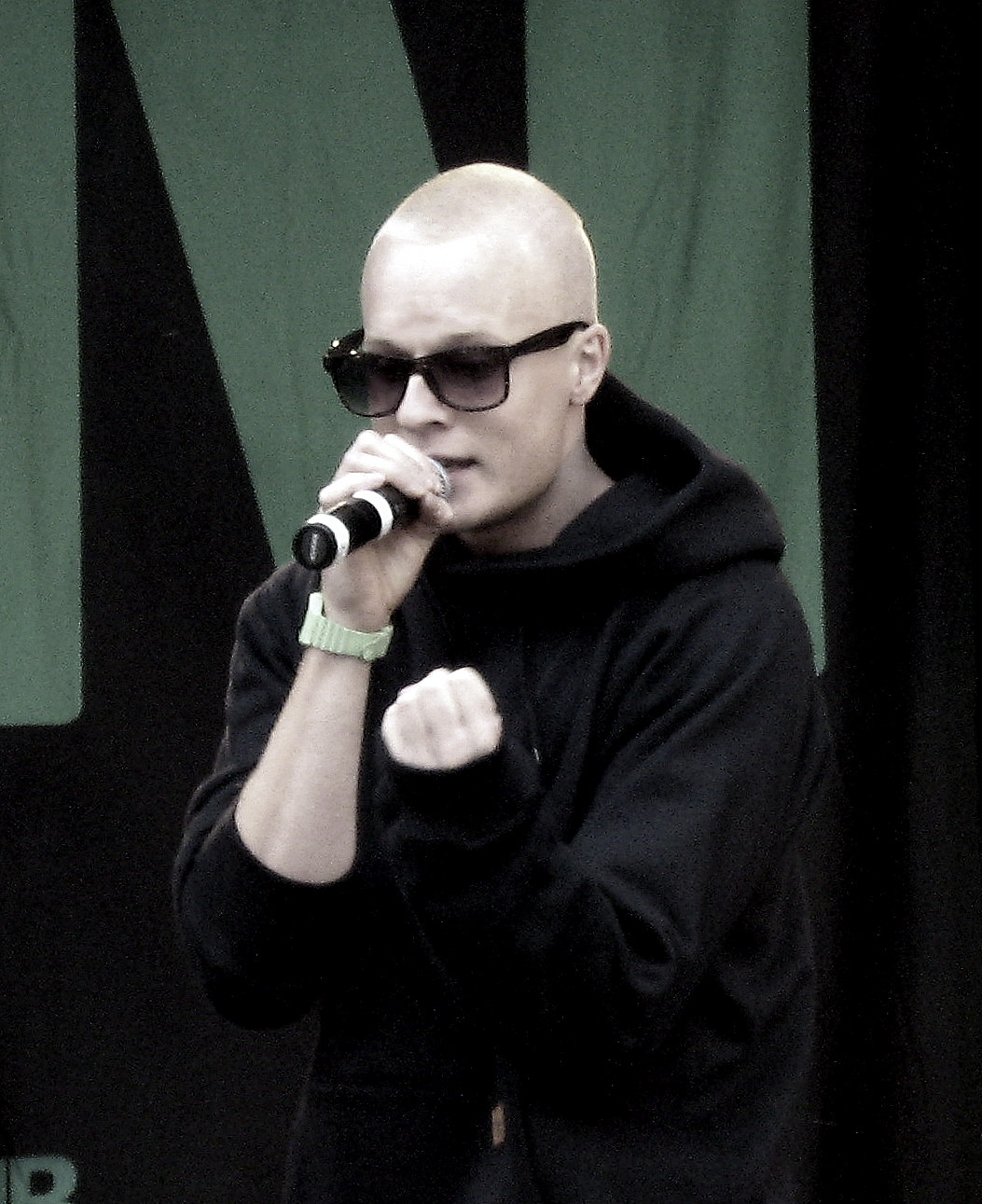
- Xander in 2011

Background information
- Born: Alexander Theo Linnet; 4 April 1988 (age 38)
- Origin: Copenhagen, Denmark
- Genres: Pop
- Occupations: Singer, songwriter
- Instrument: Vocals
- Years active: 2010–present
- Label: ArtPeople

Alexander Theo Linnet (born 4 April 1988), performing under his mononym Xander, is a Danish pop singer and songwriter. Xander is the son of singer Anne Linnet and Mads Buhl Nielsen. He is signed to the ArtPeople record label.

He debuted with the hit single "Det burde ikk være sådan her" (meaning "It should not be like this" in Danish) in September 2010, making to the top of the Danish charts selling over 30,000 copies. Xander released his debut album, Over skyer, under vand (meaning "Above clouds, under water" in Danish) on 28 February 2011.

== Discography ==
=== Albums ===
Year	Title	Highest position	Certification
Year	Title	Denmark	Certification
2011	Over skyer, under vand	9	
2012	Hvis jeg skrev dig en sang	7	
2016	Indre by	8	
2020	Indre by 2	27	

=== Singles ===
Year	Single	Peak chart positions	Certifications	Album
Year	Single	Denmark	Certifications	Album
2010	"Det burde ikk være sådan her"	1	Gold	Over skyer, under vand
2011	"Os to og mine lagner"	25		Over skyer, under vand
2012	"Over alle bjerge"	17		
2012	"Hvis jeg skrev dig en sang"	20		

==== Featured singles ====
Year	Single	Peak chart positions	Certifications
Year	Single	Denmark	Certifications
2011	"Den første nat" (Ankerstjerne feat. Xander)	10	
2011	"En anden" (Wafande feat. Xander)	19	
