= Dybt vand (song) =

Single by Svenstrup & Vendelboe featuring Nadia Malm

from the album Svenstrup & Vendelboe
- Language: Danish
- Released: 22 April 2011
- Recorded: 2010/11
- Genre: Dance
- Length: 3:58
- Label: Labelmade / Sony Music / Disco:wax
- Songwriters: Kasper Svenstrup * Thomas Vendelboe * Engelina Larsen

Svenstrup & Vendelboe singles chronology
| "I nat" (2010) | "Dybt vand" (2011) | "Glemmer dig aldrig" (2012) |

Nadia Malm singles chronology
| "Dybt vand" (2011) | "Glemmer dig aldrig" (2012) |

"Dybt vand" is a song by Danish electro, dance and house duo Svenstrup & Vendelboe, featuring vocals from Nadia Malm. It was released in Denmark as a digital download on 22 April 2011. The song peaked at number 1 on the Danish Singles Chart.

== Music video ==
A music video to accompany the release of "Dybt vand" was first released onto YouTube on 7 June 2011 at a total length of three minutes and thirty-three seconds. As of April 2016 it has received over 3 million views.

== Track listing ==
Digital download
| No. | Title | Length |
|---|---|---|
| 1. | "Dybt vand" (Radio Edit) | 3:12 |
| 2. | "Dybt vand" (Original) | 3:58 |

== Chart performance ==
| Chart (2011) | Peak position |
|---|---|
| Denmark (Tracklisten) | 1 |

== Release history ==
| Region | Date | Format | Label |
|---|---|---|---|
| Denmark | 22 April 2011 | Digital Download | Labelmade / Sony Music / Disco:wax |
