= Kl. 10 =

Single by Medina

from the album For altid
- Language: Danish
- Released: 31 October 2011
- Recorded: 2011
- Genre: Electropop, R&B
- Length: 4:04
- Label: Labelmade
- Songwriters: Jeppe Federspiel, Rasmus Stabell, Medina

Medina singles chronology
| "Synd for dig" (2011) | "Kl. 10" (2011) | "Execute Me" (2011) |

Kl. 10 is a song by Danish singer Medina from her third studio album For altid. It was released as the third single from the album on 31 October 2011. "Kl. 10" peaked at number one in Denmark for five consecutive weeks, becoming Medina's eighth number-one single.

== Track listing ==
- Danish digital download
1. "Kl. 10" – 4:04

== Charts and certifications ==
=== Charts ===
| Chart (2011) | Peak position |
|---|---|
| Denmark (Tracklisten) | 1 |

=== Year-end charts ===
| Chart (2011) | Position |
|---|---|
| Danish Singles Chart | 32 |

=== Certifications ===
| Country | Certification |
|---|---|
| Denmark | Platinum |

== Release history ==
| Region | Date | Format | Label |
|---|---|---|---|
| Denmark | 31 October 2011 | Digital download | Labelmade |
