= Svenstrup & Vendelboe =

Danish musical duo

- Origin: Denmark
- Genres: Pop, electropop
- Years active: 2007 – present
- Members: Kasper Svenstrup; Thomas Vendelboe
- Website: www.svenstrupvendelboe.com

Svenstrup & Vendelboe is an electro / dance / house producer team from Denmark, consisting of Kasper Svenstrup and Thomas Vendelboe.

Svenstrup and Vendelboe, produced music together for several years under various names. But in 2007 they decided to focus entirely on the commercial house scene under the name Svenstrup & Vendelboe. They became famous for the single "I Nat" with singer Karen. But their big breakthrough came with their remix of Medina's single "Kun for mig" winning two Danish DeeJay Awards in 2010 for their mix of the song. In 2011, they also released "Dybt vand" featuring Danish singer Nadia Malm on vocals. They have remixed hits by Robyn, Basim, Burhan G, Brinck, Emma, Medina, Outlandish and many others.

== Discography ==
=== Albums ===
Year	Album	Peak chart positions	Certification
Year	Album	DEN	Certification
2013	Svenstrup & Vendelboe	7	

=== Singles ===
Title	Year	Peak chart positions		Certification	Album
Title	Year	DEN	NOR	Certification	Album
2010	"I nat" (feat. Karen)	12	20	Gold	Svenstrup & Vendelboe
2011	"Dybt vand" (feat. Nadia Malm)	1	1	Platinum	Svenstrup & Vendelboe
2012	"Glemmer dig aldrig" (feat. Nadia Malm)	2	1	Platinum	Svenstrup & Vendelboe
2012	"Where Do We Go from Here" (feat. Christopher)	2	1		Svenstrup & Vendelboe
2013	"Hvor ondt det gør" (feat. Josefine)	6	3		Svenstrup & Vendelboe

Featured in

Title	Year	Peak chart positions	Certification	Album
Title	Year	DEN	Certification	Album
2013	"Junkie" (Medina feat. Svenstrup & Vendelboe)	18		Forever 2.0/US Vers., Svenstrup & Vendelboe
2014	"Dyyh Dyyh" (Dybvaaaad feat. Svenstrup & Vendelboe)	8		
