= Medina (singer) =

Danish musician

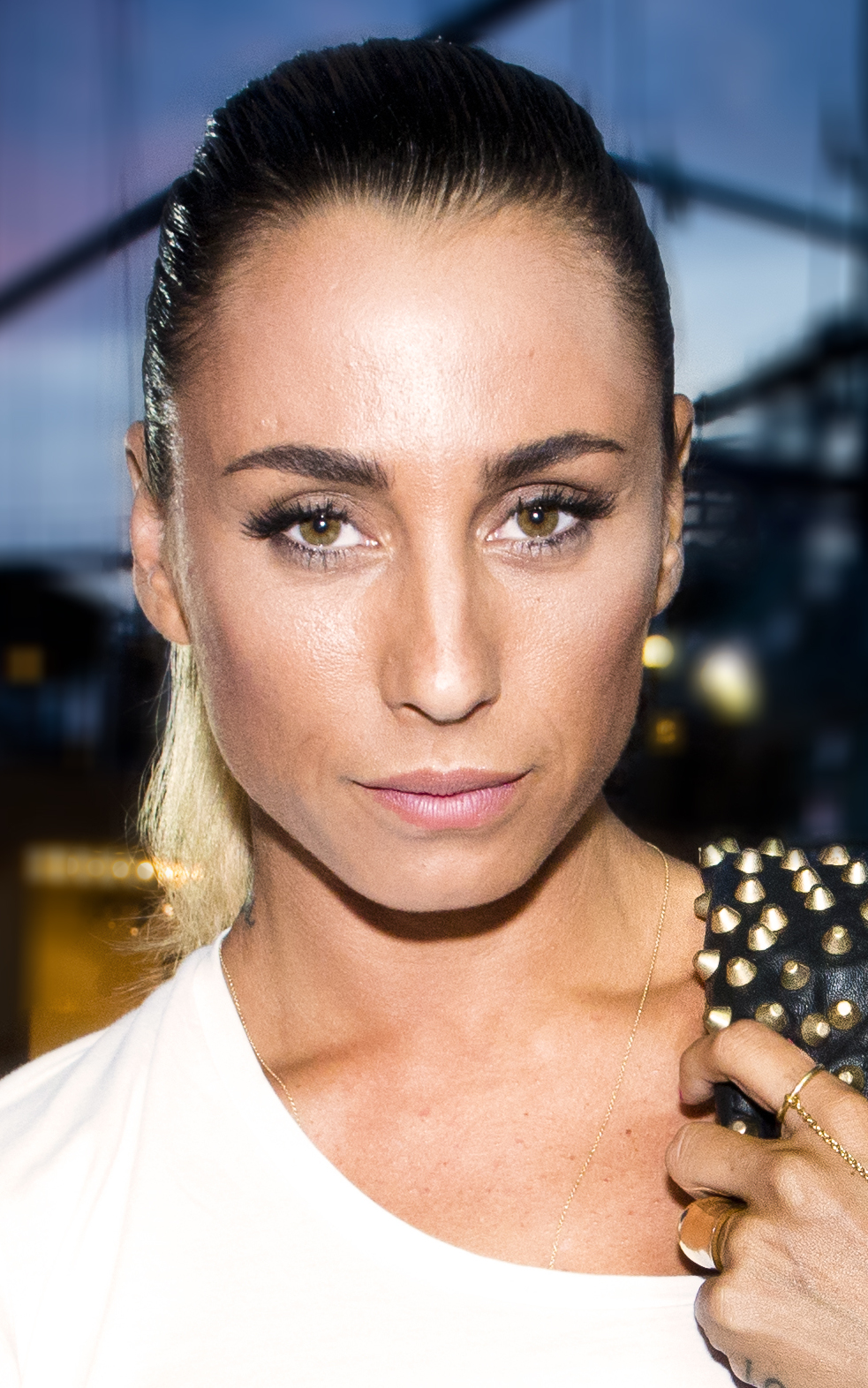
- Medina at Sommarkrysset in Stockholm 2014

Background information
- Born: Andrea Fuentealba Valbak; 30 November 1982 (age 43); Aarhus, Denmark
- Genres: Pop; dance; electropop; R&B
- Occupations: Singer; songwriter; actress
- Instrument: Vocals
- Years active: 2007–present
- Labels: Labelmade; Parlophone; EMI; Ultra; Republic
- Website: medinamusic.dk

Medina Danielle Oona Valbak (born Andrea Fuentealba Valbak; 30 November 1982), known as Medina (Danish: [me̝ˈtiːnæ]; Spanish: [meˈðina]), is a Danish singer and songwriter. She has released one EP and seven studio albums. She became popular with various singles such as "Kun for mig" in Scandinavia, and "Addiction" in various European and English-speaking countries. At the 2010 Danish Music Awards, she won female artist of the year, Album of the year, and Songwriter of the year.

== Career ==
=== 2007: Tæt på ===
She released her first two singles in Denmark titled "Flå" ("Rip") and "Et Øjeblik" ("One Moment") in 2007. These were followed by her debut album, Tæt på (Close by).

=== 2008–2010: Welcome to Medina and rise to fame ===
She rose to fame primarily within several countries in Western Europe in 2008 with the release of "Kun for mig" (which was later released in English as "You and I"), the lead single off her second album, Velkommen til Medina (Welcome to Medina). The single spent six weeks at number one on the Danish Singles Chart, eventually reaching triple-platinum status. The second single off the same album, "Velkommen til Medina" also charted number one in Denmark which spent five weeks at the top of the singles chart and reached a platinum status there. Medina's third and fourth single, "Ensom" ("Lonely") and "Vi to" ("The two of us") peaked at number two in Denmark, and they both earned her a platinum-award.

In September 2009, Medina released an English-language version of "Kun for mig", titled You and I, in the UK, Germany, Austria and Switzerland. This version reached thirty-nine on the UK Singles Chart and entered the top-ten on the German Singles Chart.

In 2009, two collaborative singles of Medina also reached the top of the Danish charts. First is "100 dage" by Medina and Thomas Helmig and the second is "Mest ondt" by Burhan G featuring Medina.

Awards won by Medina include Best Danish Act at the 2009 and 2011 MTV Europe Music Awards. In 2010 Medina won six awards at the Danish Music Awards, she was awarded Danish Female Artist of the Year, Danish Album of the Year (Velkommen til Medina), New Danish Name of the Year, Danish Hit of the Year (Vi to), Danish Songwriter of the Year (together with Providers) and Danish Producer of the Year (Providers for Medina).

In July 2010, Medina's international debut album, Welcome to Medina was released. It reached 9th in Germany, 45th in Austria, and 24th in Switzerland. Apart from seven new songs, the album also includes English-language versions of the four singles off its Danish counterpart, including "Lonely" (English version of "Ensom"), it was released as the second single from the album.

=== 2011–2012: For Altid and Forever ===
In 2011, her Danish studio album For Altid was released, including the single's "Synd for Dig", "For Altid", "Kl. 10", "12 Dage", "Lyser i Morke", and "Har du Glemt". The repackaged special edition included the final single "Junkie (featuring Svenstrup)", the latter released single's take on a more EDM, Dance-Pop sound, reminiscent of Velkommen til Medina. It was followed up in 2012 by the English version of the same name, titled Forever.

=== 2013–2018: Hiatus, small projects, and return with We Survive and Grim ===
From 2013 to 2015, Medina went on a short hiatus between 2012 and 2014, later embarking on smaller projects, including the release of an urban-inspired EP and a live album, both of which are rimarily in Danish.

Since 2016, she has released two studio albums, We Survive (English studio album) in 2016, and Grim (Danish studio album) in 2018.

=== 2019–2021: New singles, Det Bliver Altid Forår ===
Medina has released several new singles (featuring a single with the band Zookeeper's). In the first half of 2020, she released a new live album titled Det Bliver Altid Forår, the album includes several of her most famous Danish singles recorded and performed amidst a live audience, prior to the outbreak of COVID-19. She also married her partner in mid-2020. In July 2020, Medina announced via social media that new music was coming, leading to speculation that she would be releasing a new album. It is set to include multiple languages, a first for Medina. However, it has not been confirmed by Medina whether those rumours are true. Medina's new album is set to have a more urban and EDM sound compared to her previous studio albums.

In the latter half of 2020, Medina would go on to release several new singles, mostly in Danish, including several Danish covers from the new season of "Toppen Af Poppen" (Danish TV Show), where she made a return for the new season of the show.

Her fans call themselves "Medivas".

=== 2022–present: Medina documentary ===
Medina premiered a new documentary series about her current life and past struggles in 2022, titled Medina.

== Personal life ==
Medina's father is Chilean, her mother is a Dane who grew up in Malaysia. She changed her name in 2005 to Medina Danielle Oona Valbak after visiting a numerologist. The name "Medina" is not a reference to the Saudi Arabian city of Medina, rather it is a common name in Chile.

In 2007, she was in a relationship with Samir Soud. The couple had planned to get married, but they broke up in the wake of the success of Medina's first album. Shortly after that, she had a relationship with dancer Mathias Arvedsen until 2011. She has also dated Danish singer Xander. From 2012 to 2014 she dated and lived with Danish singer Christopher, As of 2014 she was in a relationship with model Mikkel Gregers Jensen; they broke up in 2015.

Medina was confirmed in August 2020 to be expecting her first child with husband Malo Chapsal. Medina announced on Instagram in December 2021, that she is expecting her second child with Malo Chapsal, expected to arrive in June 2022.

During the COVID-19 pandemic, Medina drew controversy for spreading misinformation regarding COVID-19 and its vaccines. She posted a story on her Instagram profile in December 2021 which said: "Sick how there are no limits to how much you can lie and misinform people!!!!".

== Discography ==
Danish studio albums

- Tæt på (2007)
- Velkommen til Medina (2009)
- For altid (2011)
- Grim (2018)

English studio albums

- Welcome to Medina (2010)
- Forever (2012)
- We Survive (2016)
