= Grøn Koncert =

Series of music festivals in Denmark

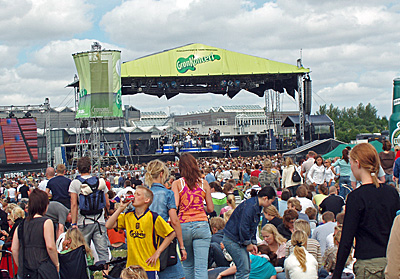
- Grøn Koncert in Århus, 2005.
- Dates: July
- Location: Various cities around Denmark
- Years active: 1983–present
- Website: www.groenkoncert.dk

Grøn Koncert (literally "Green Concert") is an annually recurring series of Danish one-day music festivals. Taking place in July, the concerts are performed by a selection of bands who tour around Denmark for about ten days. The concerts have been held every year since 1983, always with mostly or exclusively Danish artists.

The concerts are arranged by Muskelsvindfonden, a Danish support organisation for muscular dystrophy sufferers; the practical work for the concerts is done by several hundred people from "Det Grønne Crew", Muskelsvindfonden's concert volunteer group who also takes students from the Academy Of Live Technology in the UK. The main sponsor is Tuborg.

== List of concerts ==
Year	Dates	Host(s)	Performing artists	Entrance fee (DKK)	Number of volunteers	Number of spectators
1983	8 – 13 July		Sneakers, Frede Fup		40	
1984	13 – 22 July		Nanna, Sneakers, Frede Fup		44	
1985	11 – 21 July	Peter Larsen	Frede Fup, Michael Falch, Marquis de Sade		120	
1986	10 – 20 July	Frede Norbrink	Sanne Salomonsen, Thomas Helmig, TV-2		160	
1987	9 – 19 July	Jacob Haugaard	Anne Linnet, Thomas Helmig, One Two		150	
1988	8 – 17 July	Anne Marie Helger, Peter Larsen	Gnags, Sanne Salomonsen, Lis Sørensen		260	
1989	6 – 16 July	Hans Otto Bisgaard	Hanne Boel, Anne Linnet, Sanne Salomonsen, Dodo & the Dodo's		250	
1990	13 – 22 July	Jacob Haugaard	Gnags, Thomas Helmig, One Two		320	
1991	12 – 21 July	Jacob Haugaard	Anne Linnet, Ray Dee Ohh, Mats Ronander, Sko/Torp		325	
1992	10 – 19 July	Hans Otto Bisgaard	Gnags, Sanne Salomonsen, Lars H.U.G., Michael Learns to Rock		400	
1993	9 – 18 July	Jacob Haugaard	Henning Stærk, Hanne Boel, Lisa Nilsson, The Sandmen	20	450	
1994	15 – 24 July	Jacob Haugaard	Sanne Salomonsen, Gnags, Sort Sol, Zapp Zapp	30	450	
1995	7 – 16 July	Jacob Haugaard	Lis Sørensen, Thomas Helmig, Leningrad Cowboys, D:A:D	30	458	
1996	5 – 14 July	Jacob Haugaard	Savage Rose, Gnags, Angélique Kidjo, Sort Sol	40	500	
1997	11 – 20 July	Jacob Haugaard	Østkyst Hustlers, Poul Krebs, Thomas Helmig, TV-2	40	550	
1998	10 – 19 July	Jacob Haugaard	Eric Gadd, Aqua, Sneakers, D:A:D	60	600	
1999	9 – 18 July	Jacob Haugaard	Cartoons, All Saints, Thomas Helmig, TV-2	60	540	
2000	7 – 16 July	Jacob Haugaard	A*Teens, Det Brune Punktum, Sanne Salomonsen, Creamy, Funkstar De Luxe	75	600	
2001	13 – 22 July	Jacob Haugaard	Aqua, Den Gale Pose, Outlandish, Karen, TV-2, Poul Krebs	60/80	600	
2002	12 – 21 July	Jacob Haugaard, Banjos Likørstue	DJ Encore, Safri Duo, Tim Christensen, Big Fat Snake, Simple Minds, Junior Senior, Swan Lee, Superheroes	60/100	700	
2003	11 – 20 July	Jacob Haugaard, Banjos Likørstue	Junior Senior, Lars H.U.G., Suede, TV-2, Malk de Koijn, Mew, Carpark North	70/100	700	
2004	9 – 18 July	Jacob Haugaard, Banjos Likørstue	Nik & Jay, Big Fat Snake, Thomas Helmig, D:A:D, Tina Dickow, Tue West, Jokeren	70/100	680	
2005	15 – 24 July	Jacob Haugaard, Banjos Likørstue	Safri Duo, Tim Christensen, Sanne Salomonsen, TV-2, Peter Sommer, Kira & The Kindred Spirits, Johnny Deluxe, Niarn	80/120	650	
2006	14 – 23 July	Jacob Haugaard, Simon Jul Jørgensen	Poul Krebs, Nik & Jay, Nephew, Thomas Helmig, Magtens Korridorer, Tina Dickow, Anders Matthesen, L.O.C.	90/130	630	
2007	19 – 29 July	Jacob Haugaard, Simon Jul Jørgensen, Jøden	L.O.C., Beth Hart, Nephew, TV-2, Alphabeat, Ufo Yepha, Veto, MC's Fight Night Tag Team	100/150	650	
2008	17 – 27 July	Jacob Haugaard, Henrik Povlsen, Kanonkongen, Jøden	Magtens Korridorer, Aqua, Nik & Jay, D-A-D, Spleen United, Suspekt, Burhan G, MC's Fight Night Tag Team Battle	130/150	650	190,000
2009	16 – 26 July	Jacob Haugaard, Henrik Povlsen, Kanonkongen, Kristian Humaidan (UFO)	Sys Bjerre, Tim Christensen, L.O.C., Kashmir, Infernal, Volbeat, TV-2, MC's Fight Night Tag Team Battle	150/200	650	160,000
2010	15 – 25 July	Jacob Haugaard, Henrik Povlsen, Kanonkongen, Kristian Humaidan (UFO)	Alphabeat, Carpark North, D-A-D, Tina Dickow, Thomas Helmig, Medina, Selvmord, MC's Fight Night Tag Team Battle	150/200	650	187,000
2011	14 – 24 July	Jacob Haugaard, Henrik Povlsen, Kanonkongen	Dúné, Medina, De Eneste To, Tim Christensen, Kato & Friends, tv·2, Kashmir, Nik & Jay	170/250	650	125,000
2012	19 – 29 July	Jacob Haugaard, Tonni The Man, Henrik Povlsen, Kanonkongen	Burhan G, Alphabeat, Malk de Koijn, Rasmus Seebach, L.O.C., Nephew	180/230	650	191.000
2013	18 – 28 July	Jacob Haugaard, Tonni The Man, Sara Bro, David Neerup Mandel	Nik & Jay, Magtens Korridorer, Mads Langer, Carpark North, Medina, KATO, Donkey Sound with Wafande, Shaka Loveless, Klumben and Raske Penge, Lukas Graham	190/240	650	184.500
2014	17 – 27 July	Jacob Haugaard, Tonni The Man, Sara Bro, David Neerup Mandel	Mads Langer with Tim Christensen, Burhan G, Lågsus with Kidd TopGunn Specktors Djämes Braun, Shaka Loveless, Lukas Graham, Suspekt, Kashmir, Nik & Jay	200	650	175.500
2015	16 – 26 July	Jacob Haugaard, Tonni The Man, Sara Bro, David Neerup Mandel	Lågsus with Emil Stabil Cisilia Vild Smith, Christopher, Turboweekend with Oh Land, Magtens Korridorer with Østkyst Hustlers, Tina Dickow with Søren Huss, Medina, Lukas Graham, L.O.C. with B.A.N.G.E.R.S.	210/260		165.000
2016	21 – 31 July	Jacob Haugaard, Tonni The Man	Lågsus with Gilli Citybois Emil Stabil, Shaka Loveless with Rasmus Walter, Stine Bramsen with Nabiha, Mads Langer, De eneste to with Loveshop, Nik & Jay, Suspekt, D-A-D	225		155.500
2017	20 – 30 July	Jacob Haugaard, Tonni The Man, Sara Bro, Andrew Moyo	Rasmus Seebach, L.O.C., Christopher, S!vas with Ukendt Kunstner, The Minds of 99, Kongsted, Bro, Skinz, Jeppe Loftager	250/300		138.000
2018	19 – 29 July	Jacob Haugaard, Tonni The Man, Dennis Ravn, Signe Krarup JoJo	Lukas Graham, D-A-D, Aqua, Suspekt, Phlake, Joey Moe with Cisilia	275/350		191.000 (record)
