= Tuborg GreenFest =

Annual series of music events

Tuborg GreenFest is an annual series of rock music events that takes place in a few European countries during the summer months. Since 2005, Danish beer makers Tuborg, part of the Carlsberg Group, have brought together well-known rock bands and artists for one-day festivals in Russia, Serbia and Ukraine. 2008 saw concerts held in Bulgaria and Croatia for the first time, and in 2009 GreenFest premiered in Romania.

GreenFest borrows its name and image from the popular beer Tuborg Green, a pilsner popular with the youth for its long association with music.

== History ==
The Tuborg GreenFest mainly draws its inspiration from the Green Concerts (Grøn Koncerts) music tours that take place every year in its home country of Denmark. The concerts were started in 1983 by the Muscular Dystrophy Foundation (Muskelsvindfonden) to raise awareness and funds for treating the disease, and the concerts still remain popular today with Danish artists such as D.A.D, Big Fat Snake, Thomas Helmig, Tina Dickow, Jokeren, and Nik & Jay joining in the tours. In 2004, the whole tour generated 5.5 million Danish kroner for Muskelsvinfonden.

Tuborg also has a long-standing association with music festivals through its sponsorship dating from 2002 with Roskilde Festival, the largest rock festival in Northern Europe. Tuborg then turned its musical prowess to vehicle talent towards Europe with its association with the Exit Festival in Serbia, one of the largest music festivals in Europe. In 2007, it won the Yourope award for Best European Festival.

In 2006, the first Tuborg Green Revolution Tour played open-air concerts in six major cities across Ukraine. 2006 also saw the first transnational promotion with winners of Tuborg promotions across Ukraine, Bulgaria, Serbia and Croatia being taken to rock festivals in Tuborg tour buses. In addition Tuborg has been participating in Russia with its involvement in the production of such large-scaled musical events as the Maxidrom in 2004 and the Russian Music Awards in 2006.

Building on its musical credentials in 2007 Tuborg teamed up with Live Nation, the world's biggest musical events company, and has just signed a deal with Festival Republic, concert organisers of the Reading and Leeds Festival.

== Events by year ==
=== 2005 ===
==== Russia ====
Then called the Loud and Live Festival featuring Foo Fighters, Garbage and Queens of the Stone Age at the Olimpiyskiy stadium, Moscow, Russia on 29 June.

=== 2006 ===
==== Russia ====
This one-day festival featured The Rasmus, Agatha Christie, Smyslovye Gallyutsinatsii and Zemfira in Yekaterinburg, Russia on 14 June.

This one-day festival also featured Jamiroquai, The Rasmus, Mattafix and Smyslovye Gallyutsinatsii in St. Petersburg, Russia on 15 June.

This one-day festival also featured The Rasmus, Splean, Znaki, Smyslovye Gallyutsinatsii and Zemfira in Rostov-on-Don, Russia on 16 June.

=== 2007 ===
==== Ukraine ====
This three-day festival featured Placebo, David Guetta and Faithless at the Palace of Sport in Kyiv, Ukraine on 3–5 June.

==== Serbia ====
This one-day festival featured Red Hot Chili Peppers, Kasabian, Kiril Džajkovski, Edo Maajka, Ritam Nereda in Inđija, Serbia on 26 June.

==== Russia ====
The festival featured Linkin Park in Saint Petersburg on June 5 and Moscow on June 6.

This one-day festival also featured Metallica, HIM in Moscow on 18 July.

=== 2008 ===
==== Russia ====
This two-day festival featured Fatboy Slim, Groove Armada and Leeroy Thornhill in St. Petersburg on 19 June and Moscow, Russia on 20 June.

==== Serbia ====
This one-day festival featured Franz Ferdinand, Cypress Hill and The Raveonettes at Belgrade Arena, Serbia on 2 July.

==== Bulgaria ====
This one-day festival featured Whitesnake and Def Leppard in Sofia, Bulgaria on 4 July.

==== Croatia ====
The two-day festival featured Kaiser Chiefs in Zagreb, Croatia on December, 3rd.

=== 2009 ===
One-day festival with Depeche Mode in Bulgaria on 18 May.
One-day festival with Depeche Mode in Serbia on 20 May.
One-day festival with Depeche Mode in Croatia on 21 May.

One-day festival with Linkin Park, Funeral for a Friend and Lumen in Saint Petersburg, Russia on July 26.
Three-day festival with Guano Apes and Chicane in Bucharest, Romania from September 4 to September 6.

=== 2010 ===
One-day festival with Pink, Good Charlotte and Mumiy Troll in Saint Petersburg, Russia on July 18.

=== 2011 ===
One-day festival with Thirty Seconds to Mars, Skunk Anansie, The Pretty Reckless and Ассаи in Saint Petersburg, Russia on July 13.

=== 2012 ===
==== Russia ====
One-day festival with Red Hot Chili Peppers and The Vaccines in Saint Petersburg, Russia on July 20.

==== Ukraine ====
One-day festival with Red Hot Chili Peppers, Kasabian and The Vaccines in Olimpiyskyi National Sports Complex Kyiv, on 25 July 2012.

==== Romania ====
Three-day festival with Guns N' Roses, Machine Head, The Cult, Evanescence and other artists in Bucharest, Romania between June 29 and July 1.

=== 2013 ===
==== Russia ====
One-day festival with Limp Bizkit, Goldie, Dub FX, Kasta and Oxxxymiron in Saint Petersburg, Russia on June 29.

=== 2014 ===
==== Baku ====
One-day festival with Manga, Duman, mor ve ötesi and Elnur Hüseynov performance at the stadium named after Tofig Bakhramov on June 13.

==== Russia ====
One-day festival with The Prodigy, Die Antwoord, Hollywood Undead and Lyapis Trubetskoy in Saint Petersburg, Russia on June 29.

One-day festival with Die Antwoord, Leeroy Thornhill, Therr Maitz and Rocco in Krasnoyarsk, Russia on November 8.

One-day festival with Die Antwoord, Leeroy Thornhill, Therr Maitz and Dos Buratinos in Yekaterinburg, Russia on November 10.

=== 2015 ===
==== Russia ====
One-day festival with Muse, GusGus, Poets of the Fall and Jack Action in Saint Petersburg, Russia on June 21.

=== 2016 ===
==== Russia ====
The one-day festival was held under the name Tuborg Green Jam featered Earl Sweatshirt, Just Blaze, Skryptonite, Pharaoh and Samoe Bolshoe Prostoe Chislo in Moscow, Russia on August 13.

=== 2017 ===
==== Russia ====
The one-day festival was held under the name TBRG Open Fest featered Major Lazer, AJ Tracey, Skryptonite, Obladaet, Mount Kimbie, Markul, Tommy Cash, Malbek, Nazar Rad, Dj Nik One & Bumble Beezy and Meep in Moscow, Russia on September 30.
