= Tears (Danish band) =

Danish rock band

- Origin: Aarhus
- Genres: Jazz fusion
- Years active: 1967-1976
- Past members: Anne Linnet; Holger Laumann; Bent Lundgaard; Bjørn Veierskov; Jens Jefsen; Ed Jones; David Cadogan

Tears was a Danish band formed 1967 in Aarhus, as one of the first jazz-rock bands from Denmark. The first record Tears from 1970 became very rare when a fire at Spectator Records destroyed tapes and stock in 1972. In relation to Holger Laumann's job as a music teacher, Tears also recorded an album in 1970 under the name It's So Easy, which was a children's record with Lis Sørensen.

The singer Anne Linnet joined Tears at the age of 17, and participated on the two records from 1973 to 1974, which are still called a kind of jazz-rock. Her relationship with the band member Holger Laumann had a significant influence on how she later became a famous musician in Denmark, through Shit & Chanel. Tears called themselves Det Beskidte Dusin in 1975, and a record with the same name was released in 1977. Tears was not officially dissolved, but sometimes played in other contexts. Anne Linnet left Tears in 1976.

== Anne Linnet's first solo album ==
The album Sweet Thing from 1973 is often regarded as the first solo album from Anne Linnet. Tears at least functions as the backup band, like on the album Anne Linnet from 1975. Anne Linnet is on the album cover from 1973, where her name has a more prominent font style than Tears. The yellowish color depicts syrup, which fits with the title Sweet Thing.

== Discography ==
=== Albums ===
- Tears (Spectator Records, 1970)
- Sweet Thing (Artist, 1973)
- Tears in My Ears (Artist, 1974)

=== Singles ===
- Lyset (Artist, 1971)
- Pædagogisk drama (Edition Wilhelm Hansen, 1971)
