= MC's Fight Night =

MC's Fight Night (abbreviated as MCFN or MCSFN) is an annual event of the Danish hip hop community with competition in the disciplines of impromptu rap (freestyle) hosted by Primo Entertainment. Although earlier rappers from other Scandinavian countries were allowed, now the battle is confined solely to Danish rappers making it the definitive freestyle rap competition for rap in Denmark.

The event consists of "verbal battles" (i.e. games) between two rappers placed in a boxing ring and battles are done via microphones (hence the name MC, short for Microphone Controller). Those resorting to physical violence are disqualified. Finalists are decided after auditions held in various cities where hundreds of rappers apply. Judges eliminate one of the two contestants in 1/8 finals, quarterfinals, semifinals and the final finale. Each "battle" is limited to two laps of 1 minute on a particular subject. In the final, an extra free third round is added.

Those attending usually determining results. But in case of wide disagreements or split voting, the judges determine the winner in boxing style. The winner is crowned "MC's Fight Night Champ", while the rapper with the best monologue during the evening receives the "Den Gyldne Mikrofon" (The Golden Microphone) (also known as Årets Punchline Award). In addition to cash prizes (on a winner takes all basis - no prizes for runners-up), a championship belt was added as an additional reward in 2004 carrying names of all previous champions.

The event has attracted increasing attendance which has prompted the event organizers to switch the venue from Amager Bio with capacity of 800 where the earlier battles were held to Cirkusbygningen that accommodated 2000 people. In 2005 the organizers moved the event again to an even larger venue at KB Hallen, that could accommodate 4000 people. The event is always sold-out.

Participants also take part in charity work, including Grøn Koncert for Danish one-day music festivals in support of muscular dystrophy victims.

== Discography ==
The "battles" are recorded and important segments appear in annual releases by Primo Entertainment. For example:

- 2003: MC's Fight Night All-Stars
- 2005: Fight Beats
- 2006: Fight Beats Part 2
