= Sneakers (band) =

Danish rock band

- Origin: Copenhagen, Denmark
- Genres: Pop rock
- Years active: 1979–1985, 1998
- Labels: Mercury Records; Universal Music Group

Sneakers was a Danish rock band active from 1979 to 1985, and briefly reunited in 1998. Among its members were notably lead vocalist Sanne Salomonsen and on keyboards Morten Kærså. The group had big hits with "Sui-Sui" and particularly "Woodoo". Sneakers really made Sanne Salomonsen a pop icon in Denmark, and she continued with her solo career after Sneakers.

== History ==
Sneakers was formed in May 1979 in Copenhagen by keyboardist Morten Kærså and guitarist Poul Halberg as the main players. Sanne Salomonsen joined the year after, and the band released its first album, Sneakers in 1980. It became a success, which was followed the year after by the even more popular Sui-Sui with tracks, such as "Bellevue" and the title track of the album. With Sanne Salomonsen as lead vocalist, the band performed in Denmark with great success.

There were two more studio albums, and the group was then dissolved in February 1985. In the subsequent years, compilation albums were released including some rarities. Sneakers was reunited for a short while in 1998 to promote the compilation album Sneakers Greatest released in 1997, and performed at Grøn Koncert, as well as Midtfyns Festival the same year.

After Sneakers, members have continued to make their mark on the Danish scene in the bands Moonjam, Halberg Larsen, Danseorkestret and others, while Sanne Salomonsen mostly found success as a solo artist.

== Members ==
- Morten Kærså: keyboard & vocals (1979–1985)
- Sanne Salomonsen: vocals (1979–1985)
- Klaus Menzer: drums (1979–1985)
- Jacob Andersen: percussion (1979–1985)
- Poul Halberg: guitar (1979–1980)
- Moussa Diallo: bass (1979–1980)
- Mikkel Nordsø: guitar (1980–1985)
- Christian Dietl: bass (1980–1985)

== Discography ==
=== Studio albums ===
- 1980: Sneakers
- 1981: Sui-Sui
- 1982: Rou'let
- 1984: Katbeat

=== Compilation albums ===
- 1988: Sneakers / Sui-Sui
- 1994: Totale
- 1997: Sneakers Greatest (2 CDs)
- 2005: Woodoo
- 2005: Tag med mig
- 2005: De kender ikke Jimmi
- 2008: Sneakers & Sanne Salomonsen (3 CDs)
- 2008: Dejlige danske ... (2 CDs)
