= School of Euphoria =

School Of Euphoria

Studio album by Spleen United
- Released: 30 January 2012
- Genre: Electronic rock; synth-pop; acid
- Length: 43:55
- Label: Copenhagen Records
- Producer: Carsten Heller

Spleen United chronology
Neanderthal (2008)	School Of Euphoria (2012)	The Blur of Zebras (2024)

Singles from School of Eurphoria
- 1. "Sunset to Sunset" Released: 21 June 2010; 2. "Days of Thunder" Released: 21 November 2011; 3. "Misery" Released: 11 January 2012; 4. "Euphoria" Released: 22 October 2012

School Of Euphoria is the third studio album by Danish electronic rock band Spleen United, released on 30 January 2012 by Copenhagen Records. The album was developed over several years following Neanderthal (2008) and marked a decisive shift toward a more electronic and club-oriented sound, characterised by extensive use of synthesisers, programmed rhythms, and repetitive structures, including influences from acid house. Compared with the band's earlier work, School of Euphoria placed less emphasis on traditional rock instrumentation and song-based arrangements.

Upon release, School of Euphoria received generally positive reviews from Danish music critics, who praised its production and stylistic focus while offering more mixed responses to its pacing and emotional range. The album produced several singles, including "Days of Thunder", "Misery", and the title track "Euphoria", and was supported by a Danish tour in spring 2012. The release coincided with a period of heightened live activity for the band, including late-night festival performances and experimental concert formats.

In retrospect, School of Euphoria has been viewed as a defining release in Spleen United's catalogue, representing the culmination of the band's transition from alternative rock toward fully electronic expression.

== Background and recording ==
Following Neanderthal (2008), Spleen United spent several years developing material for a third studio album. In a January 2012 interview, frontman Bjarke Niemann stated that the extended production period was driven less by a lack of material than by an exploratory working process, during which the band tested multiple ideas and directions before committing to a final approach. According to Niemann, the recording process was divided into several phases. An initial period lasting more than a year focused on experimentation and research, during which the band explored different musical influences and production techniques without aiming for a finished product. A more structured recording phase began in early 2011, when the group entered the studio with a clearer vision for the album, though this vision continued to evolve during the sessions. As a result, the album was recorded multiple times as arrangements and production methods were repeatedly revised. Niemann described the band's intention with School Of Euphoria as a deliberate move away from conventional songwriting practices. He stated that the group sought to dismantle established structures in favour of a more open-ended and process-driven approach, allowing electronic elements and experimentation to play a central role in the album's composition and overall sound.

During the recording period for School Of Euphoria, bassist and guitarist Gaute Niemann left Spleen United. The departure was made public shortly after the album's release in February 2012, though Niemann stated that the decision had been taken earlier in the recording process and occurred without internal conflict. He cited increasing professional commitments outside the band as the primary reason for his departure. Despite leaving the group, Niemann remained involved with the album in a managerial capacity and contributed to its completion, including work related to the track "Misery".

== Composition and style ==
Reviewing the album for Soundvenue, Lasse Posborg Michelsen wrote that the band embraced electronic production more fully than on previous releases, referencing influences ranging from 1990s dance music to contemporary electronic producers such as Gold Panda and Four Tet. The review characterised the album as energetic and danceable, particularly in its opening tracks, while noting a drop in momentum on the second half. A retrospective article by The Electricity Club highlighted acid house influences on the album, including prominent use of TB-303-style basslines.

The song "Misery" features guest vocals by Danish actress and singer Gitte Nielsen. In interviews with GAFFA, frontman Bjarke Niemann described the track as addressing themes of loneliness and self-destructive behaviour, contrasting a pop-oriented musical framework with darker lyrical content. Nielsen has stated that she related personally to the song's themes, which influenced her contribution to the recording.

== Release and promotion ==
Ahead of the album's release, Spleen United issued a series of singles. The track "Sunset To Sunset" was first released in summer 2010, accompanied by a music video and an interactive promotional campaign that included a site with puzzles and visuals tied to the recording sessions and marathon performance that inspired its title. By late 2011, GAFFA reported that "Sunset To Sunset" was expected to appear on the band's forthcoming third album. This was followed by the release of the single "Days Of Thunder" on 21 November 2011, after which the band announced a Danish spring tour in support of the album.

School of Euphoria was released on 30 January 2012 by Copenhagen Records. Additional singles from the album included "Misery", and the title track "Euphoria", which were issued throughout 2012 and supported by music videos. The promotional campaign emphasised the album's electronic and club-oriented direction, aligning its release with festival appearances and late-night concert formats.

== Critical reception ==
Professional ratings
Review scores
Source	Rating
Ekstra Bladet	3/6 stars
GAFFA	5/6 stars
Jyllands-Posten	4/6 stars
Politiken	4/6
Soundvenue	4/6 stars
Århus Stiftstidende	4/6 stars

School of Euphoria was met with generally positive reviews from Danish music critics. Commentators largely welcomed the album's continued move toward electronic and dance-oriented music, though several noted a more restrained emotional and structural approach compared with the band's earlier releases. Reviewing the album for GAFFA, Michael José González praised its club-focused production and described it as a confident and cohesive electronic statement, highlighting the band's commitment to atmosphere and physicality. Politiken similarly characterised the album as a natural progression in Spleen United's development, noting its emphasis on repetition, texture, and mood rather than conventional rock songcraft.

Several reviewers commented on the album's structure and pacing. Soundvenue highlighted the strength of the opening tracks and the clarity of the album's electronic vision, while suggesting that its momentum diminished in the latter half. Writing for Jyllands-Posten, Peter Schollert echoed this assessment, noting that while the album was stylistically assured, its uniformity occasionally limited its dynamic range. Århus Stiftstidende described School of Euphoria as a focused and mature release, though less immediate than the band's previous work, emphasising its controlled and disciplined approach to electronic pop. In contrast, Thomas Treo of Ekstra Bladet offered a more critical response, framing the album's electronic focus as a pronounced stylistic shift that did not consistently result in memorable material, despite acknowledging the band's ambition and technical proficiency.

== Track listing ==
School of Euphoria track listing
No.	Title	Length
1.	"Days Of Thunder"	3:34
2.	"Misery (featuring Gitte Nielsen)"	4:27
3.	"Sunset To Sunset"	6:21
4.	"Simplicity"	4:24
5.	"Euphoria"	3:37
6.	"π"	1:43
7.	"Bright Cities Keep Me Awake"	3:27
8.	"Groundspeed"	4:02
9.	"µ"	1:36
10.	"Loebner"	4:13
11.	"It's A Wild Life"	6:31
Total length:		43:55

== Charts ==
Chart (2012)	Peak position
Danish Albums Chart	14
