= Fantaghirò 2 =

- German DVD cover
- Written by: Gianni Romoli
- Directed by: Lamberto Bava
- Starring: Alessandra Martines; Kim Rossi Stuart; Brigitte Nielsen
- Music by: Amedeo Minghi
- Country of origin: Italy
- Original language: Italian

Production
- Producers: Lamberto Bava; Andrea Piazzesi
- Cinematography: Gianlorenzo Battaglia
- Editor: Piero Bozza
- Running time: 200 minutes (2 parts)
- Production company: RAI
- Budget: Over 5 billion Italian lira

Original release
- Network: Canale 5
- Release: 20 December 1992

Fantaghirò 2 (also known as The Cave of the Golden Rose 2) is the second television film in the Fantaghirò series, directed by Lamberto Bava and originally aired in 1992 as a two-parter (and so is known in certain releases as Fantaghirò 3 and Fantaghirò 4 due to the previous instalment being a two-parter as well). Most of the principal cast of the previous film returned for this instalment.

The story of Fantaghirò 2 tells the continuing adventures of the titular princess (Alessandra Martines), daughter of a king without a male heir (Mario Adorf), as she and Prince Romualdo (Kim Rossi Stuart) are finally about to get married. However, Princess Fantaghirò is soon forced to fight for his heart against the wicked Dark Witch (Brigitte Nielsen) who opposes their pure relationship and has cast her love spell over the prince, and so Fantaghirò heads towards the Dark Kingdom to defeat the evil queen.

== Plot ==
=== Part 1 ===
Following the events of the first film, Princess Fantaghirò and King Romualdo are due to be married. The love between the two youths pushes the King to abdicate in favour of Fantaghirò, who will marry Romualdo. But the Dark Witch, an evil ruler of the faraway Dark Kingdom, is disgusted by the purity of their love and wishes to destroy it, and to this end she kidnaps Fantaghirò's father, demanding the kingdom of Fantaghirò in exchange for her life.

The couple holds off their wedding so Romualdo can lead their army to save Fantaghirò's father. On the journey to the Dark Kingdom, Romualdo, and his men encounter Forest Elves and their Queen, who force them to submit to a series of tests to prove that their intentions are pure. Romualdo passes them and the army continues on their way. They eventually reach the borders of the Dark Kingdom where they make camp for the night. As they are resting, the Dark Witch, magically disguised to look like Fantaghirò, arrives and gets Romualdo to kiss her. He faints and the evil queen takes him to her Dark Castle where she makes him her lover.

=== Part 2 ===
The real Fantaghirò has decided to secretly go to the Dark Kingdom on her own. She cuts her hair again and travels with her horse Golden Mane and friend the White Witch who transforms herself into a goose. Along the way, she encounters bandits led by the Lemon Gobbler, but she manages to escape. When she arrives at Romualdo's camp, she finds it abandoned. Fantaghirò enters the Dark Castle and learns that Romualdo's men have all been thrown in the dungeon. She negotiates with the Dark King to have a single duel between Fantaghirò and the Dark Kingdom's champion to decide the victor to avoid a war, with the losing kingdom submitting to the other. The king agrees but, Fantaghirò is shocked to discover that she has to fight her beloved, Romualdo, who has forgotten all about her and now loves the witch to the point of worship.

While Fantaghirò and Romualdo are duelling, the Dark Witch's minions Bolt and Lightning rebel against their mistress and drug her into sleep. Bolt and Lightning release Romualdo's men, who subdue Romualdo, stopping him from killing Fantaghirò. The group flees from the castle, taking Romualdo, as well as the Dark King as a hostage. Everyone's able to escape the Dark Kingdom except Romualdo, who runs back to the witch, and Fantaghirò, who chases after Romualdo and is forced to face the powerful witch in an uneven duel. Fantaghirò wins with her wits, by daring her enemy to turn herself into a crystal form, which the princess then smashes using a talking stone that she had found earlier in her adventure. With the Dark Witch gone, the Dark King is revealed to be Fantaghirò's father, who was bewitched to forget his true self.

It seems that Fantaghirò's victory put an end to all the witch's spells, as the Dark King reverts to being himself and Fantaghirò and Romualdo return to their castle. However, Romualdo's memories do not return. The desperate Fantaghirò, with the help of her protector the White Witch, recreates the events where they crossed paths for the first time. Romualdo starts to regain his memories but it turns out that a magical remnant of the Dark Witch has been hiding in his mind. She reappears to transform Fantaghirò into a lowly creature, but the White Witch and Lightning together manage to destroy the Dark Witch completely. Romualdo then guesses correctly that Fantaghirò has been turned into an ugly toad, and upon kissing her, the two are reunited again as their true love triumphed over evil.

== Cast ==
- Alessandra Martines as Fantaghirò
- Kim Rossi Stuart as Romualdo
- Brigitte Nielsen as the Dark Witch (voice: Aurora Cancian)
- Stefano Davanzati as Cataldo (voice: Fabrizio Pucci)
- Tomás Valík as Ivaldo (voice: Riccardo Onorato)
- Mario Adorf as the King (voice: Gianni Musy)
- Lenca Kubálková as Bolt (voice: Rossella Acerbo)
- Jakub Zdeněk as Lightning (voice: Laura Lenghi)
- Katarina Kolajova as the White Witch (voice: Elettra Bisetti)
- Karel Roden as Goldeye
- Anna Geislerová as the Queen of Elves (voice: Stella Musy)
- Barbora Kodetová as Catherine (voice: Francesca Draghetti)
- Kateřina Brožová as Carolyn (voice: Paola Valentini)
- Narrator: Gianni Giuliano

== Production ==
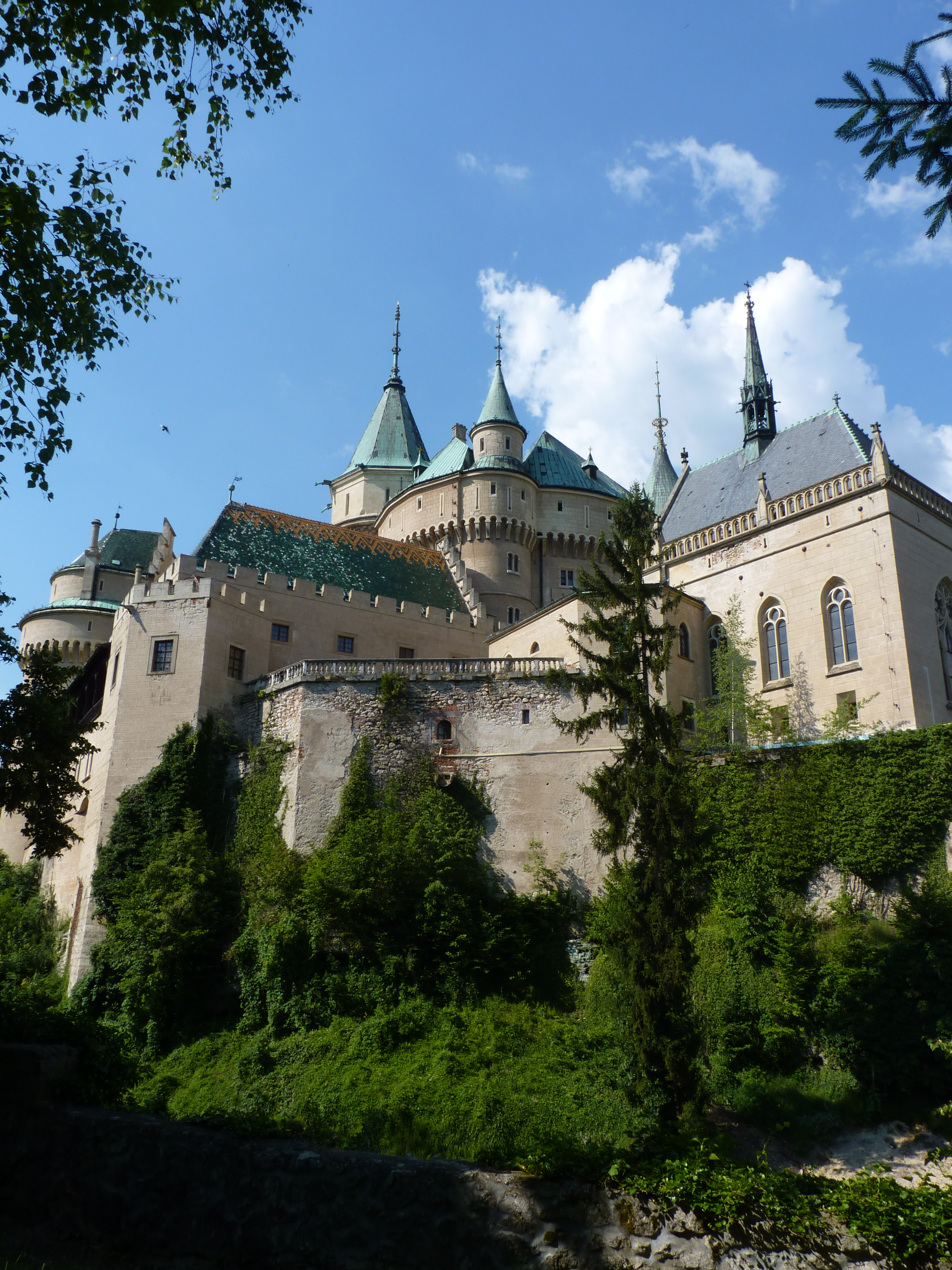
Bojnice Castle was the Black Witch's castle in the film

Director and producer Lamberto Bava made Fantaghirò 2 in Czechoslovakia to limit the costs. It was shot in July 1992 at Bojnice Castle, Bouzov Castle, a park and an artificial castle in Lednice, and in-studio in Bratislava by a mixed Italian and Czechoslovak crew of over 100. The film's special effects were created by Armando Valcauda, known from his work on the horror film Demons and its sequels, and the costumes were designed by Marisa D 'Andrea. The production cost 6 billion Italian lira.

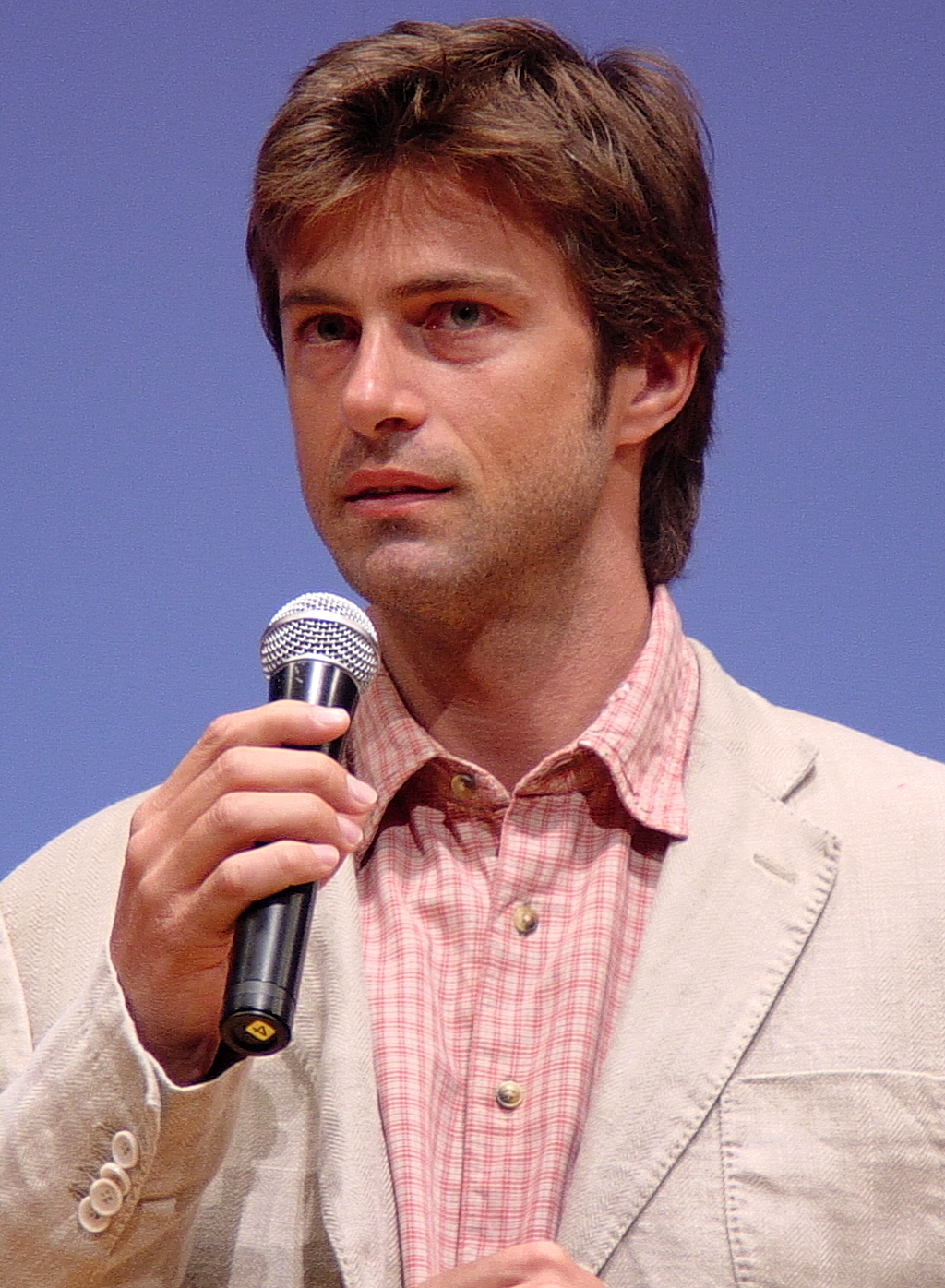
Kim Rossi Stuart in 2007

Kim Rossi Stuart claimed that he enjoyed the role of the evil Romulado, nicknamed "Romul' altro" ("Romul 'other") by the film crew, saying that "naughty second identity" was more fun to play than the "sympathetic cliché" of an honest and fair Romualdo, and especially liking the scenes of him being intimate with Brigitte Nielsen's sultry Dark Witch. During the filming of the fight between Romualdo and Fantaghiro, performed with no stunt doubles, his sword actually struck Alessandra Martines in the head, luckily causing no severe injury; Martines went to the hospital while still wearing her costume. Nielsen said her character was to be "more than a witch, but a queen, the type of Grimilde" from Disney's Snow White. Ángela Molina, who have both played both the White Witch and the White Knight in the first Fantaghirò, was replaced by Katarina Kolajova for the second film; Kolajova later married Cataldo's actor Stefano Davanzati whom she met on the set.

== Release ==
The film premiered on Canale 5, broadcast in two parts. The first part was originally scheduled for 21 December but was aired one day earlier to avoid the competition of the final episode of the sixth season of crime drama La piovra. The move sparked a "chain reaction" of programs being accordingly shuffled on other Italian channels. Fantaghirò 2 was later dubbed into multiple languages for foreign television broadcasts and released on home video (VHS and DVD) in Italy and several other countries. The film and its prequel and sequel were recut (reduced and intersected with each other) into a 200-minute compilation film titled La meravigliosa storia di Fantaghirò ("The Wonderful Story of Fantaghirò") in 1995.

== Reception ==
Fantaghiro 2 proved to be a commercial success, receiving the audience of 6,601,000 (25.11%) (first part) and 9,160,000 (30,6%) (second part) when first aired in Italy. Polish weekly Tele Tydzień gave it three stars out of five. Italian daily Corriere della Sera hailed the film maker Lamberto Bava, saying he has learnt the lessons of his father and comparing his work to Ridley Scott's Legend, and also applauding Brigitte Nielsen for her "difficult" role as the Black Witch. Nielsen's character was received so well that the popular villainess later returned for three successive chapters of the saga. Critique Film's Erika Musiedlak retrospectively opined it was the last Fantaghirò film worth watching, also praising Nielsen's "flawless" acting as a "marvelously diabolical" antagonist.

== Sequel ==
In the 1993 sequel, Fantaghirò fights against the handsome but cruel wizard Tarabas (Nicholas Rogers) and his mother, the witch Xellesia (Ursula Andress), to bring back to life the prince Romualdo, turned into a stone statue, and save the child princess Esmeralda.
