= Morten Kærså =

Danish composer, pianist, singer, and producer

Morten Kærså (born 26 September 1957) is a Danish composer, pianist, singer and producer. He is known from the bands Sneakers and Moonjam.

== See also ==
- List of Danish composers
