= Neanderthal (album) =

Studio album by Spleen United
- Released: 2008
- Genre: Synthpop
- Label: Copenhagen Records

Spleen United chronology
Godspeed Into the Mainstream (2005)	Neanderthal (2008)	School Of Euphoria (2012)

Neanderthal is the second studio album by Danish electronic rock band Spleen United. It topped the Danish Albums Chart at #1.

== Track listing ==
Disc I

1. Suburbia (4:27)
2. My Tribe (3:57)
3. Failure 1977 (4:17)
4. Heat (6:47)
5. Everybody Wants Revenge (4:07)
6. Dominator (3:56)
7. 66 (5:35)
8. High Rise (3:10)
9. My Tribe Part II (2:34)
10. Under the Sun (7:12)
11. My Jungle Heart (5:54)

Disc II

(Live From MTV Spanking New Music Tour)

1. Suburbia (5:03)
2. She Falls in Love with Machines
3. Dominator
4. My Jungle Heart (6:45)
5. My Tribe (4:36)

My Tribe

- 6. My Tribe (Video) - Good Boy! Creative (4:11)
- 7. My Tribe (Making The Video) – Carl Gustav Winther, Rie Neuchs (3:54)

== Charts ==
Chart (2008)	Peak position
Danish Albums Chart	1
