= Friværdi =

Studio album by Magtens Korridorer
- Released: 26 September 2005
- Genre: Rock
- Length: 36:55
- Label: Universal Music

Magtens Korridorer chronology
Bagsiden af Medaljen (1998)	Friværdi (2005)	Det Krøllede Håb (2007)

Friværdi is an album from the Danish band Magtens Korridorer.

Professional ratings
Review scores
Source	Rating
Gaffa	link

== Track listing ==
1. "Vesterbro" – 3:17
2. "Nordhavn Station" – 3:10
3. "Lorteparforhold" – 3:18
4. "Pisser På Plakaten" – 3:24
5. "Picnic (På Kastellet)" – 3:36
6. "Sara Har.." – 4:44
7. "Tilt" – 3:15
8. "Fnasksangen" – 3:35
9. "Lørdag Formiddag" – 3:40
10. "Leila Khaled" – 2:28
11. "Døden Nær" – 4:28
