= Brigitte Nielsen =

Danish actress, model, and singer (born 1963)

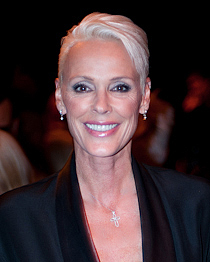
- Nielsen at London Fashion Week in 2010
- Born: Gitte Nielsen; 15 July 1963 (age 63); Rødovre, Denmark
- Occupations: Actress; model; singer
- Years active: 1984–present
- Known for: Rocky IV - Cobra (1986 film)
- Height: 6 ft 0 in (183 cm)
- Spouses: Kasper Winding (m. 1983; div. 1984); Sylvester Stallone (m. 1985; div. 1987); Sebastian Copeland (m. 1990; div. 1992); Raoul Meyer (m. 1993; div. 2005); Mattia Dessì (m. 2006)
- Partners: Mark Gastineau (1988–1990); Flavor Flav (2004–2005)
- Children: 5
- Website: brigittenielsen.com

Brigitte Nielsen (Danish pronunciation: [pʁiˈkitə ˈne̝lsn̩]; born Gitte Nielsen; 15 July 1963) is a Danish actress, model, and singer. She began her career modelling for Greg Gorman and Helmut Newton. She subsequently acted in the 1985 films Red Sonja and Rocky IV, later returning to the Rocky series in Creed II (2018). Nielsen starred in the 1986 film Cobra alongside her then-husband Sylvester Stallone. She played a villain in Beverly Hills Cop II (1987) and starred as the Black Witch in the 1990s Italian film series Fantaghirò. She later built a career starring in B-movies, hosting TV shows, and appearing on reality shows.

== Career ==
=== Modelling ===
Standing 1.83 m (6 ft 0 in), at the beginning of the 1980s, Nielsen did some modelling work, and was photographed by Greg Gorman and Helmut Newton. Nielsen posed for Playboy magazine multiple times, garnering the cover in December 1987. In the late 1980s, Marvel Comics approached Nielsen to pose for photographs dressed as the comic book character She-Hulk. Nielsen's exploits were well-covered in the entertainment media in the 1980s, and the world press started referring to her as an "Amazon" because of her tall stature.

=== Acting ===
In 1985, Nielsen began her acting career in the fantasy film Red Sonja alongside Arnold Schwarzenegger. That same year, she married Sylvester Stallone; the couple acted in two films together (Rocky IV and Cobra) before divorcing in 1987.

In 1987, Nielsen played Karla Fry in the film Beverly Hills Cop II (1987), alongside Eddie Murphy. In 1991, she was cast as Jennifer Walters/She-Hulk in a planned but never-produced film based on She-Hulk. She posed for photos dressed both as Jennifer Walters and her alter-ego, She-Hulk, before the film was cancelled.

Subsequently, she starred in 976-Evil II, The Double 0 Kid (1992), Chained Heat II (1993), Galaxis (1995), and Snowboard Academy (1997). She starred as the villainess of the Italian TV fantasy film Fantaghirò 2 and its sequels (1992–1996); her character was supposed to be killed off in the first of these films, but was then brought back due to popular demand.

In 2011, Nielsen voice acted for the Danish animated comedy film Ronal the Barbarian. In 2012, she played in the horror movie Eldorado. In 2013, she has featured in the short art film The Key alongside Ray Stevenson. In 2014, she starred in the science-fiction film Exodus, in the TV series Raising Hope, and in the action film Mercenaries. In 2018, she reprised her role of Ludmilla Drago from Rocky IV in Creed II. In 2022, she joined the cast of TV Series The Guardians of Justice, when she played Anubis Queen.

=== Music and writing ===
Nielsen started a music career in 1987. She released her debut album Every Body Tells a Story in that year and recorded a duet with Austrian pop star Falco, Giorgio Moroder's penned "Body Next to Body", which went to No. 22 in Germany and No. 6 in Austria. She released a follow-up album, I'm the One... Nobody Else, in 1992.

Nielsen released a few songs under the pseudonym "Gitta" because producers wanted to see if she could succeed as a singer without her name on the cover. The first song "No More Turning Back" peaked at No. 54 on the British Single Charts, No. 63 on the Dutch Single Charts and even reached the Top 10 in Spain. Other tracks recorded as Gitta were 2001's "Tic Toc" and 2002's "You're No Lady", a collaboration with Ru Paul.

Nielsen appeared in Michael Jackson's "Liberian Girl" music video in 1989 and in metal band Korn's music video for the single "Make Me Bad" in 2000. In 2008, German record label Edel Music re-released her 1991 album I'm the One... Nobody Else and the 1987 Every Body Tells a Story under the title Brigitte Nielsen. In 2012, she performed (as Gitte Nielsen) on the song "Misery" with Spleen United, from the album School of Euphoria.

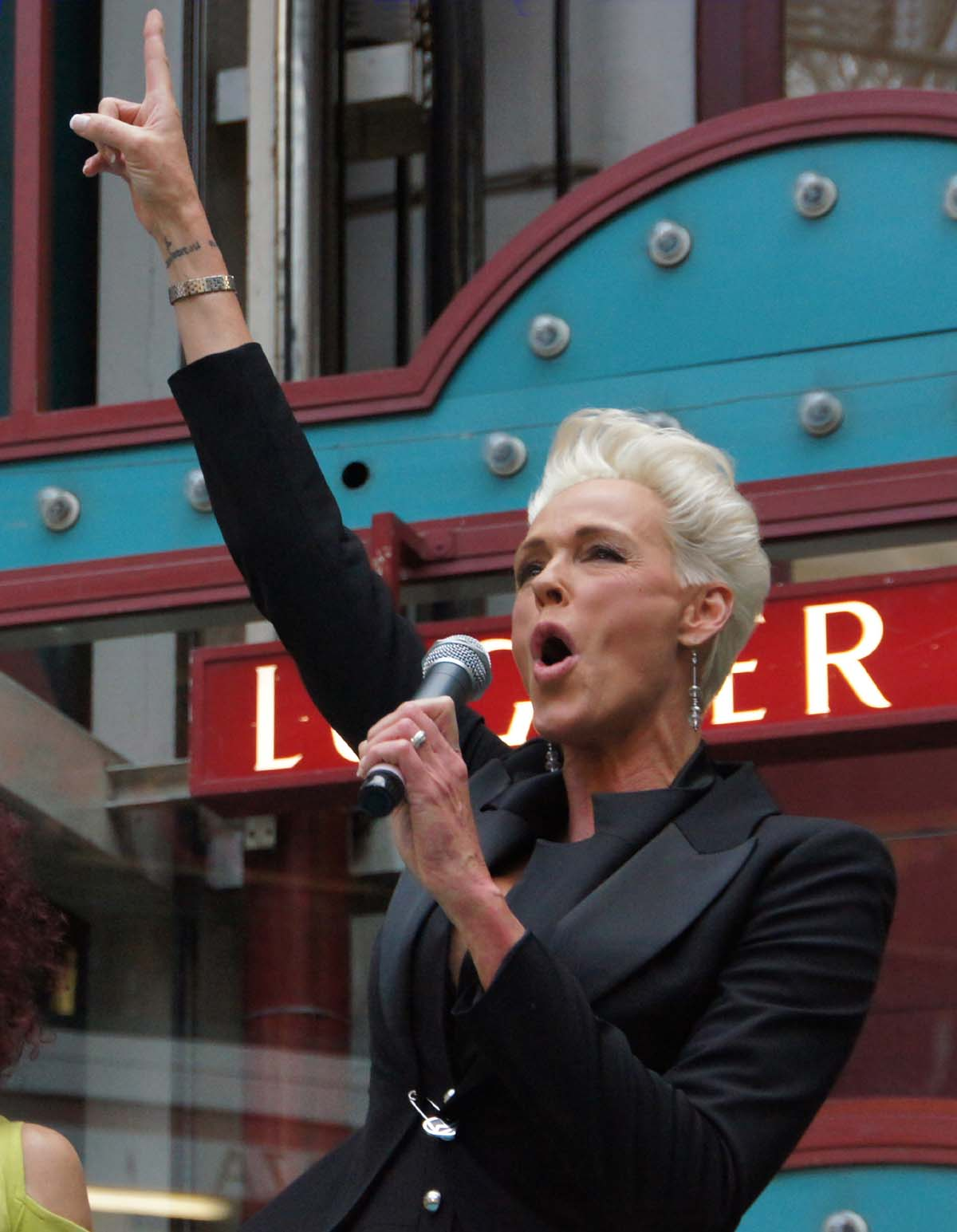
Nielsen was guest of Richard Lugner at the Vienna Opera Ball in 2012

In 2009, she published her first autobiography in Scandinavia titled "Gitte Nielsen – Du har kun ét liv – sådan fandt jeg tilbage til mig selv" ("You only have one life – this is how I found myself again"). The book reached the Top 5 of Denmark's bestseller list and was released in the United Kingdom under the title You Only Get One Life in 2011.

=== Television ===
Nielsen has worked for Italian television, hosting shows such as: Festival (1987), the 1992 edition of the Sanremo Music Festival, Retromarsh! (1996–1997), and ..la sai l'ultima? (1999). In 1997, she hosted a talk show series Gittes venner for a Danish TV network and some TV shows for RTSI, the Italian language Swiss television network. She guest starred for an episode of the German TV series Stuttgart Homicide, aired by ZDF on 28 March 2011, guest-hosted the British chat show Loose Women on 7 December 2010. In April 2011, she attended the British variety/talent show Sing If You Can, which aired on ITV.

Nielsen appeared on the first season of the Italian production of The Mole (2004) and on the third season of the VH1 reality show The Surreal Life (2004). Nielsen also appeared with Flav on VH1's Big in '04 Awards. In 2006, she guest-starred on Flav's other reality show, Flavor of Love. In 2003, Nielsen appeared in the Danish Big Brother VIP. In January 2005, she was a contestant in Britain's Celebrity Big Brother, along with her former mother-in-law, Jackie Stallone, coming third in the final public vote. In 2006, she appeared in another reality TV series, VH1's The Surreal Life: Fame Games. In 2007, she starred in a new British mockumentary Killing Brigitte Nielsen, which aired on Sky Travel. She also appeared in the first season of Celebrity Rehab with Dr. Drew, which chronicled her struggle to overcome her alcoholism at the Pasadena Recovery Center in Pasadena, California.

In May 2008, Nielsen revealed on German television that she would "renew" her body by having six plastic surgeries, which would cost €66,000 altogether. She was filmed during those surgeries by RTL and she had her own television show Aus alt mach neu – Brigitte Nielsen in der Promi-Beauty-Klinik. The same show was broadcast twice in Italy: at first under the title Celebrity Makeover: Brigitte Nielsen on SKY Italia in 2008 and secondly in 2009 on Italia 1. In 2009, Nielsen appeared as a panel speaker to a new group of addicts at the Pasadena Recovery Center, anticipating the two-year mark of her sobriety that coming July. Her appearance was aired in the third-season episode "Triggers", which aired in February 2010.

In 2010, Nielsen appeared as one of the celebrity contestants of TF1 reality show La Ferme Célébrités, the French version of the TV series The Farm. She was eliminated after one week, mainly due to her lack of fluency in French and subsequent difficulties to interact with the other contestants. Nielsen was one of the celebrity contestants of 2010's Let's Dance, the German version of Dancing with the Stars. That same year, she also took part of Celebrity Come Dine with Me in Denmark (Til middag hos... ), and in Germany (Das Perfekte Promi Dinner).

From 13 January 2012, Nielsen was one of the celebrity contestants and winner of Ich bin ein Star – Holt mich hier raus!, the German version of I'm a Celebrity...Get Me Out of Here!, broadcast by RTL Television. On 28 January 2012, she won the show as the "Jungle Queen". Bild revealed on 30 January 2012 that Nielsen had received the most calls from TV viewers throughout the entire show, ranking No. 1 with 30–50% of all call-ins. Nielsen was paid 150.000 Euro (approx. $163,000) for participating in the show, more than any other celebrity. In October 2012, Nielsen was featured in the Danish version of Maestro broadcast on DR1 in which celebrities competed for the chance to conduct a classical orchestra. In September 2013, she joined the cast of the German TV show Promi-Hochzeitsplaner (Celebrity Wedding planners) for Sat.1. The following year, she joined the panel of the German TV show Promi Shopping Queen for VOX.

From June 2015, she has hosted her own talk show Gitte Talks on the Danish TV Channel Kanal 4. From August 2016, she has also presented the dating show "Wirt sucht Liebe" ("Inkeeper Looking for Love") for the German TV channel RTL II.

== Personal life ==
Besides her native Danish, Nielsen is fluent in English, German and Italian, and has some understanding of French.

=== Relationships and family ===
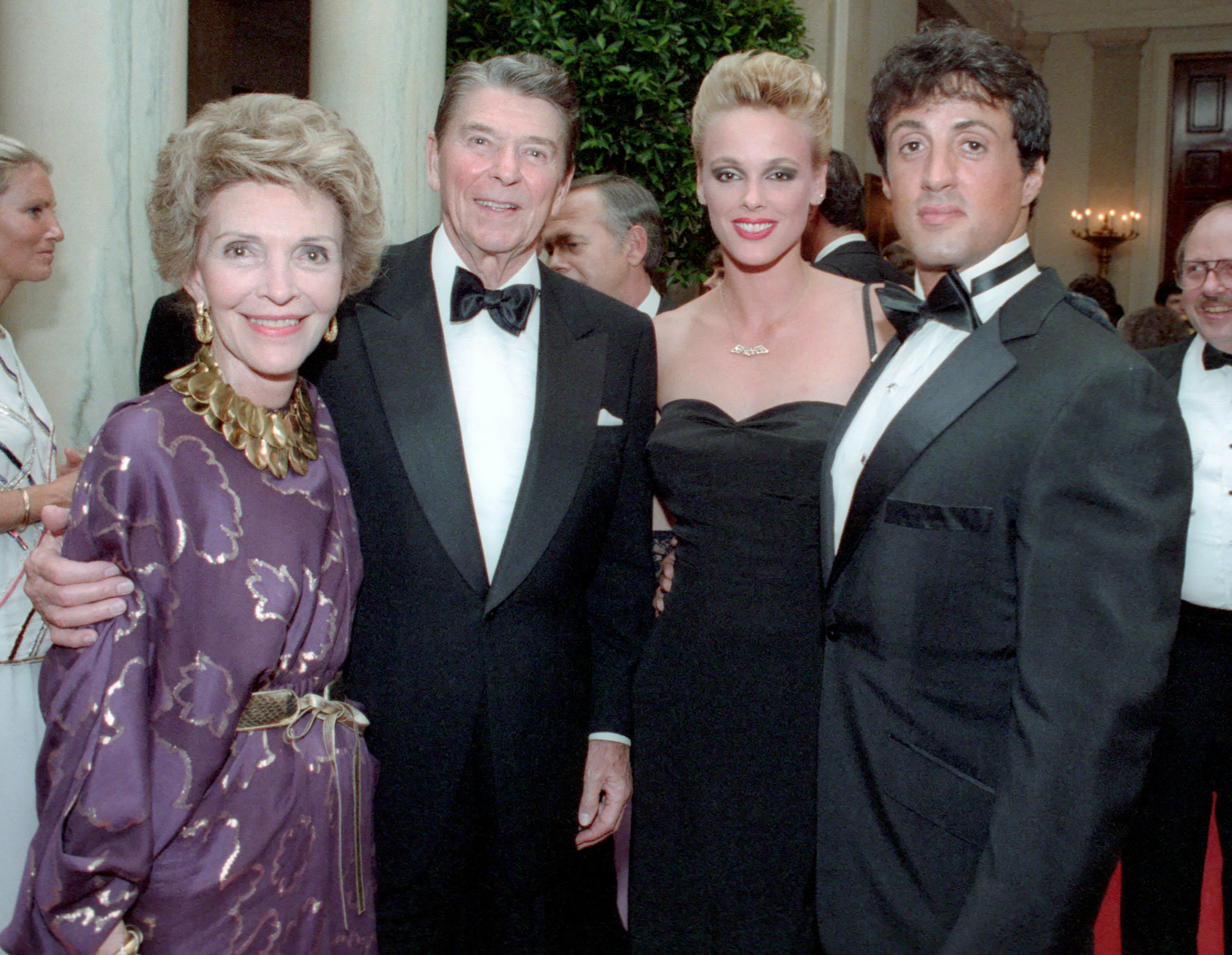
Nielsen with Sylvester Stallone, Ronald and Nancy Reagan at the White House, 1985

Nielsen has been married five times and has four sons and one daughter. Her first husband was Kasper Winding, to whom she was married from 1983 to 1984. They have one son, Julian Winding, who was largely raised by his father and had little contact with Nielsen.

In her 2011 book, she revealed having had an affair with Arnold Schwarzenegger during the filming of Red Sonja (1985), after Schwarzenegger had started a relationship with Maria Shriver. Schwarzenegger confirmed this in July 2020.

Nielsen became engaged to actor Sylvester Stallone during the production of Rocky IV. They married after the release of the film, on 15 December 1985, at the Beverly Hills, California home of producer Irwin Winkler. They eventually divorced. Their marriage and divorce were both highly publicized by the tabloid press due to their involvement on Rocky IV and Cobra.

From 1988 to 1990, Nielsen was in a relationship with American football player Mark Gastineau, with whom she had her second child, Killian Gastineau.

Between 1990 and 1992 Nielsen was married to director and photographer Sebastian Copeland. During a 2012 interview on the German reality TV show Ich bin ein Star – Holt mich hier raus!, she confessed to having had a one-night stand with Sean Penn in Cannes back in May 1991.

Nielsen married for a fourth time in 1993 to Raoul Meyer. They divorced in 2005. Nielsen has two sons with her fourth husband: Raoul Meyer Jr. and Douglas Meyer.

In 2004-2005, she had a relationship with rapper Flavor Flav, whom she met during her participation in VH1 reality show The Surreal Life.

Nielsen's husband Mattia Dessì (born 1978) lived with her in Italy as shown on Strange Love, which was filmed prior to their marriage. The couple were married in Malta on 8 July 2006. They reside in Palm Springs. In June 2018, she gave birth to her daughter Frida Dessì whilst being 1 month short of turning 55.

=== Alcohol problems ===
On 9 July 2007, Nielsen checked herself into the Cri-Help rehabilitation facility in North Hollywood following what some reports claim was a family intervention. Her manager, Steven Tempone, confirmed on 19 July 2007 that she had checked into a rehabilitation center and said, "All I know is it's something she did of her own free will and we're proud of her and wish her very well ... When she gets out we'll have a big birthday party, and Coca-Cola only." As of 22 July 2007, Nielsen was out of rehabilitation to attend the Comedy Central Roast of Flavor Flav. She remarked that she felt "like a new-born person ... I made a choice about a new life. It's not been easy but it was definitely time." While the date that Nielsen checked into rehabilitation was reported, she "had been in treatment for a few weeks." On 10 January 2008, VH1 began airing the reality TV series Celebrity Rehab. Nielsen appeared on the show for alcoholism. In a January 2010, TV Guide story on her success with sobriety, Celebrity Rehab producer John Irwin stated, "She's sober, and she quit smoking."

=== Plastic surgery ===
In mid-2008, Nielsen starred in the reality show Aus alt mach neu, broadcast by German TV station RTL. The theme of the show was Nielsen's attempt to look "as young as her husband" by undergoing plastic surgery. The show was aired in Italy as well, on Sky Italia during December 2008 and the following summer on Italia 1.

== Filmography ==
=== Film ===
| Year | Title | Role | Notes |
|---|---|---|---|
| 1985 | Red Sonja | Red Sonja | |
| 1985 | Rocky IV | Ludmilla Vobet Drago | |
| 1986 | Cobra | Ingrid Knudsen | |
| 1987 | Beverly Hills Cop II | Karla Fry | |
| 1988 | Bye Bye Baby | Lisa | |
| 1988 | Domino | Domino | |
| 1989 | Murder by Moonlight | Maggie Bartok | |
| 1992 | 976-Evil II | Agnes | |
| 1992 | The Double 0 Kid | Rhonda | |
| 1992 | Mission of Justice | Dr. Rachel K. Larkin | |
| 1992 | Fantaghirò 2 | Black Witch (Black Queen) | |
| 1993 | Fantaghirò 3 | Black Witch | |
| 1993 | Chained Heat II | Magda Kassar | |
| 1994 | Fantaghirò 4 | Black Witch | |
| 1995 | Compelling Evidence | Michelle Stone | |
| 1995 | Codename: Silencer | Sybil | |
| 1995 | Galaxis | Ladera | |
| 1996 | Fantaghirò 5 | Black Witch | |
| 1997 | Snowboard Academy | Mimi | |
| 1998 | Paparazzi | Gitte | |
| 1998 | She's Too Tall | Veronica Lamar | |
| 1999 | Hostile Environment | Minna | |
| 2000 | Doomsdayer | Elizabeth Gast | |
| 2008 | The Hustle | Rich lady | |
| 2009 | The Fish | Herself | |
| 2010 | Big Money Rustlas | Wife | |
| 2011 | Ronal the Barbarian | Amazon Queen | Voice |
| 2012 | Eldorado | Angel | |
| 2013 | The Key | | Short film |
| 2014 | Mercenaries | Ulrika | |
| 2015 | Exodus | Mother | |
| 2018 | Creed II | Ludmilla Vobet Drago | |
| 2019 | The Experience | Ezilda | |
| 2022 | The Bricklayer | Klausen | |

=== Television ===
| Year | Title too | Role | Notes |
|---|---|---|---|
| 1992 | Counterstrike | Monika Steile | Episode: "Bastille Day Terror" |
| 2000 | Un posto al sole | Gitte | 2 episodes |
| 2004 | The Surreal Life | Herself | 12 episodes (Season 3) |
| 2005 | Celebrity Big Brother | Herself | 3rd Place. Housemate with Jackie Stallone, her ex-mother-in-law. |
| 2005 | Strange Love | Herself | 11 episodes. The Surreal Life-spin-off on her Flavor Flav relationship. |
| 2006 | Flavor of Love | Herself | Episode: "IntteroGitted" |
| 2009 | Nite Tales: The Series | Mona | Episode: "Black Widow" |
| 2010 | La Ferme Célébrités | Herself | Evicted on day 7 |
| 2011 | Stuttgart Homicide | Gina Wartenberg | Episode: "Stuttgart ist sexy" |
| 2012 | Ich bin ein Star – Holt mich hier raus! | Herself | Won the season |
| 2014 | Raising Hope | Svetlana | Episode: "Road to the Natesville" |
| 2015 | Portlandia | Herself | Episode: "Healthcare" |
| 2015–present | Gitte Talks | Host | Danish TV-show (kanal4) |
| 2022 | The Guardians of Justice | Anubis Queen | 6 episodes |
| 2022 | Germany's Next Topmodel | Herself | 1 episode |

=== Video games ===
| Year | Title | Role | Note |
|---|---|---|---|
| 2026 | Grand Theft Auto VI | Madame Brigitte | Vice City FM radio co-host |

== Discography ==
=== Albums ===
- Every Body Tells a Story (1987)
- I'm the One... Nobody Else (1992)
- Brigitte Nielsen (2008, re-release of I'm the One... Nobody Else and Every Body Tells a Story)

=== Singles ===
- "Body Next to Body" – Falco meets Brigitte Nielsen; 1987; (No. 6 Austria, No. 22 Germany, No. 1 Japan)
- "Every Body Tells a Story"; 1987; (No. 38 Italy; No. 15 Germany)
- "Maybe"; 1988
- "Siento"; 1988 (South America only)
- "It's a Strange Love"; 1988
- "Rockin' Like a Radio"; 1990
- "My Girl (My Guy)"; 1991
- "How Could You Let Me Go?"; 1992
- "Work That Body"; 1993
- "No More Turning Back" (as Gitta); 2000; released by Jive; (No. 1 Spain, No. 1 Eurodance chart; No. 64 Netherlands, No. 54 UK)
- "Everybody's Turning Back" (as Gitta vs. Rozalla)
- "Tic Toc" (as Gitta); 2001; released by Blanco y Negro
- "You're No Lady" (as Gitta with Ru Paul); 2002; released by Do It Yourself; (No. 1 Spain)
- "Misery" (as Gitte Nielsen with Spleen United); 2012
