= Spleen United =

Danish electronic rock band

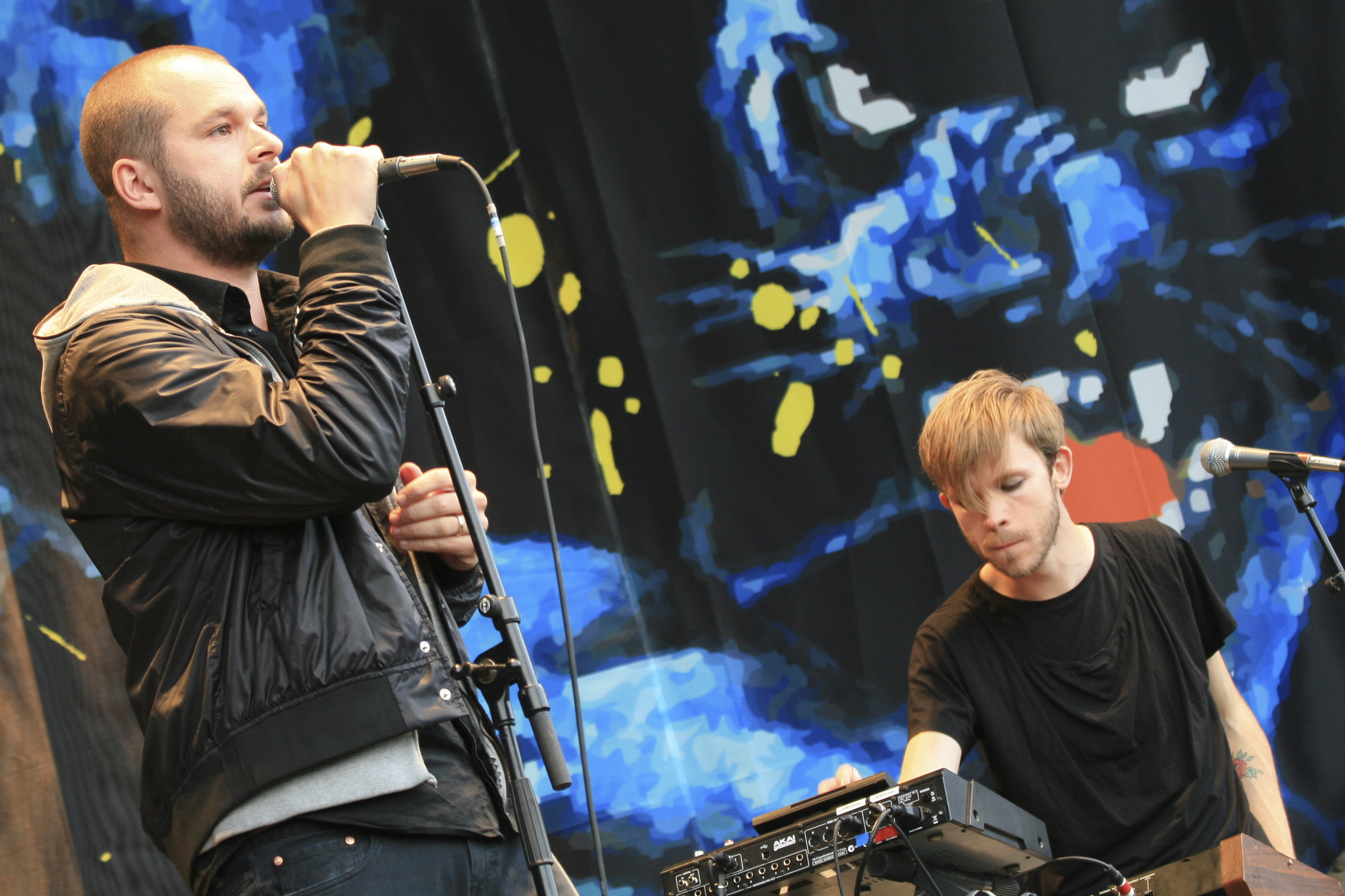
- Spleen United performing at Grøn Koncert in 2008

Background information
- Origin: Jelling, Denmark
- Genres: Electronic rock, synth-pop
- Years active: 2002–2013, 2019–present
- Label: Copenhagen Records
- Spinoffs: Lightwave Empire
- Members: Bjarke Niemann; Gaute Niemann; Kasper Nørlund; Rune Wehner; Jens Kinch
- Past members: Janus Nevel Ringsted
- Website: Official website

Spleen United are a Danish electronic rock and synth-pop band formed in Aarhus, Denmark, in 2002. The band consists of Bjarke Niemann (lead vocals, synth), Kasper Nørlund (synth, backing vocals), Rune Wehner (synth), Gaute Niemann (bass, guitar), and Jens Kinch (drums). The members have roots in Jelling, Denmark, and relocated from Aarhus to Copenhagen in 2007.

Known for combining synthesiser-driven electronics with rock instrumentation and pop-oriented songwriting, Spleen United emerged as one of the most prominent Danish alternative acts of the mid-to-late 2000s. Their debut album, Godspeed into the Mainstream (2005), established the band nationally, while commercial success followed with Neanderthal (2008), which topped the Danish album chart. After the release of School of Euphoria (2012), the band entered a hiatus amid line-up changes and internal tensions.

Spleen United reunited in their original line-up in 2019 and returned to recording with The Blur of Zebras (2024), their first studio album in twelve years.

== History ==
=== Formation and Godspeed into the Mainstream (2005–2007) ===
Spleen United was formed in Jelling, Denmark, where brothers Bjarke and Gaute Niemann grew up. Bjarke Niemann met future drummer Jens Kinch during primary school, and during their gymnasium years the group expanded to include Kasper Nørlund. Performing under the name Cabaret, the early lineup played heavy rock music at local venues in the Jutland area.

In the early 2000s, Bjarke and Gaute Niemann relocated to Aarhus, where the band gradually moved away from its earlier guitar-driven sound. Nørlund began introducing synthesizers into the group's material, and the shift toward electronic instrumentation was further developed when Rune Wehner joined the band as an additional synthesiser player. As electronic elements assumed a more prominent role, the band developed a sound combining synth-pop and electronic rock with pop-oriented song structures, a direction that came to define their early work.

Spleen United released their debut album, Godspeed into the Mainstream, in September 2005. Produced and mixed by Carsten Heller, the album marked a clear departure from the band's earlier rock-based approach, favouring synthesisers, pulsing rhythms, and dark electronic textures. Contemporary reviews described the album as drawing on elements of 1980s synth pop and shoegaze, with an emphasis on hypnotic, repetitive structures and atmospheric arrangements. Critics highlighted tracks such as the singles "Heroin Unltd" and "In Peak Fitness Condition" for their melodic hooks and distinctive electronic sound.

In retrospective assessments, Godspeed into the Mainstream has been described as an influential release in Danish electronic rock, with commentators noting its fusion of rock instrumentation and synthesisers and its lasting impact on the Danish alternative music scene in the years following its release.

In early 2006, Spleen United were invited to London to record a session for BBC Radio 1 following a performance at the Eurosonic Noorderslag festival in Groningen. The band subsequently recorded a session at Maida Vale Studios, which was broadcast on 19 June 2006 as part of the station's One World programme, providing early international exposure on British radio.

=== Neanderthal (2008–2011) ===
In late 2007, the band released the single "My Tribe", followed by their second studio album, Neanderthal, in January 2008. The album debuted at number one on the Danish album chart and was produced by American producer Michael Patterson, known for his work with artists such as Beck and Black Rebel Motorcycle Club. Singles from the album included "My Tribe", "Suburbia", "66", and "Failure 1977". "Suburbia" became the most played song on DR's P3 radio channel in 2008 and was later remixed by The Juan MacLean, among others. Following the album's release, the band undertook an extensive Danish tour, including appearances at the Roskilde Festival and Grøn Koncert.

In 2008, drummer Jens Kinch left the band, followed by Gaute Niemann's departure in 2010. During this period, the band continued as a quartet. From 16 to 17 April 2010, Spleen United conducted a continuous 24-hour improvisation performance, accompanied by an online project featuring interactive elements and exclusive content.

=== School of Euphoria and hiatus (2012–2018) ===
Spleen United released their third studio album, School of Euphoria, in January 2012. Building on the electronic direction of their previous releases, the album placed increased emphasis on synthesisers, programmed rhythms, and club-inspired structures, further distancing the band from their earlier guitar-driven sound. The album spawned the singles "Days of Thunder", "Sunset to Sunset", "Misery", and "Euphoria".

Upon release, the album received generally positive reviews from Danish music critics. Reviewers noted the band's move toward a more streamlined and dance-oriented electronic sound, with some highlighting the album's focus on atmosphere and physicality over traditional song structures. Critics at Politiken and GAFFA described the album as a confident continuation of the band's electronic direction, while Soundvenue characterised it as a polished but more restrained release compared with the band's earlier, more abrasive work.

Ahead of the album's release, the band announced a Danish spring tour in support of the record.

On 6 June 2012, Spleen United performed a late-night concert on the Arena stage at the Roskilde Festival. Reviews described the performance as a sustained, high-energy set characterised by extended tracks and a continuous, rave-like atmosphere that lasted until early morning. During the same festival, the band also staged a 24-hour performance titled From Sunset to Sunset on the festival grounds. The performance ran continuously from sunset to sunset, with parts of the music transmitted via headphones to accommodate festival campers.

Following a performance at the NorthSide Festival in Aarhus on 14 June 2013, Spleen United announced an indefinite hiatus. The concert was widely described as chaotic, featuring on-stage conflicts between band members, the destruction of instruments, and interruptions caused by crowd safety concerns. Media coverage following the performance reported internal tensions within the band and raised questions about its future. In 2016, Bjarke Niemann stated in interviews that the band had effectively disbanded, after which he formed the group Lightwave Empire.

=== Reunion and The Blur of Zebras (2019–present) ===
On 30 April 2019, Spleen United announced their reunion and a performance at the Roskilde Festival. The band reunited in its original lineup, with Gaute Niemann and Jens Kinch returning alongside Bjarke Niemann, Kasper Nørlund, and Rune Wehner.

On 10 June 2022, Spleen United released their first single in more than a decade, "Eat The Rich", which was followed up by another single "The Real Thing" on 28 October the same year.

In August 2024, Spleen United released their fourth studio album, The Blur of Zebras, their first full-length record in 12 years since School of Euphoria. The album marked a stylistic shift from the group's earlier, more club-oriented sound, incorporating mild, melodic and ambient-influenced elements that drew comparisons in the press to dreamier, psychedelic pop and bands such as Tame Impala, as well as Bjarke Niemann's solo project Lighthouse Empire. Reviews noted that while the band's return as album artists was significant after a long hiatus, the songwriting and sonic textures on The Blur of Zebras received a mixed reception from critics. The album was premiered with a concert at the Copenhagen Opera House.

== Discography ==
=== Studio albums ===
Year	Title	Peak position	Certification
Year	Title	DAN	Certification
2005	Godspeed into the Mainstream	12	Gold
2008	Neanderthal	1	Gold
2012	School of Euphoria	6	
2024	The Blur of Zebras	13	
"—" marks non-charting album

=== Singles ===
- "Heroin Unlimited" (2005)
- "In Peak Fitness Condition" (2005)
- "Spleen United" (2006)
- "She Falls in Love with Machines"
- "My Tribe" (2007)
- "Suburbia" (2008)
- "66" (2008)
- "Failure 1977" (2008)
- "Sunset to Sunset" (2010)
- "Days of Thunder" (2011)
- "Misery" (2012) (feat Gitte Nielsen)
- "Euphoria" (2012) (feat Sharin Foo)
- "Eat The Rich" (2022)
- "The Real Thing" (2022)
- "PEACE // 7 Days In The Burning Bright Sun" (2024)
- "Miss You Like Crazy" (2025)
- "Pure Emotions" (2025)
