= Anne Linnet Band =

Danish rock band

- Origin: Denmark
- Genres: Pop rock
- Years active: 1979–1983, May 2019
- Past members: Anne Linnet, Sanne Salomonsen, Lis Sørensen, Holger Laumann, Flemming Ostermann, Per Møller, Bent Lundgaard, Jan Glæsel

Anne Linnet Band was a Danish pop rock band with the singers Anne Linnet, Sanne Salomonsen and Lis Sørensen.

Anne Linnet Band was formed in 1979, and recorded the all-time ballad "Det er ikke det du siger" with Sanne Salomonsen on vocals.

Anne Linnet, Sanne Salomonsen and Lis Sørensen all had a successful solo career in the 1980s after Anne Linnet Band dissolved.

== Career ==
Anne Linnet Band began its debut tour on March 27, 1980, at Skråen in Aalborg. The tour was a great success and there were many subsequent concerts. The tour ended on April 12, 1980 in Jazzhus Montmartre. The subsequent tour began in December 1980 in Germany, and involved a concert on the Reeperbahn. Anne Linnet's later band Marquis de Sade took some inspiration from this tour at Hamburg's red-light district.

In 1981, Anne Linnet Band's first album of the same name Anne Linnet Band was released, followed by the final album Cha cha cha in 1982. The first album was certified for sales of 100 000 copies in 1982. Anne Linnet's then husband Holger Laumann played saxophone on both albums.

Anne Linnet had stated in the 2018 documentary program Anne, Sanne & Lis that a reunion of Anne Linnet Band would "not be in this life". However, the same documentary program rekindled conversation among the three singers, which ended up convincing them that a tour would be fun and a party for the fans. Even though Anne Linnet Band only existed for a few years in the '80s, they were successful. They went on a reunion tour in May 2019 to perform at five concerts in total across Denmark. At these popular reunion concerts after a 37-year break from Anne Linnet Band, they were still regarded as some of the greatest singers of Denmark from the '80s. The sold-out concert at Royal Arena with 15 000 spectators received acclaim in the media.

== Discography ==
=== Albums ===
- Anne Linnet Band (CBS Records, 1981)
- Cha cha cha (CBS Records, 1982)

=== Singles ===
- Måne, sol & stjerner / Det er ikke det du siger (CBS Records, 1981)
- Cha cha cha (CBS Records, 1982)
