= Anne Linnet =

Danish singer, composer, and writer

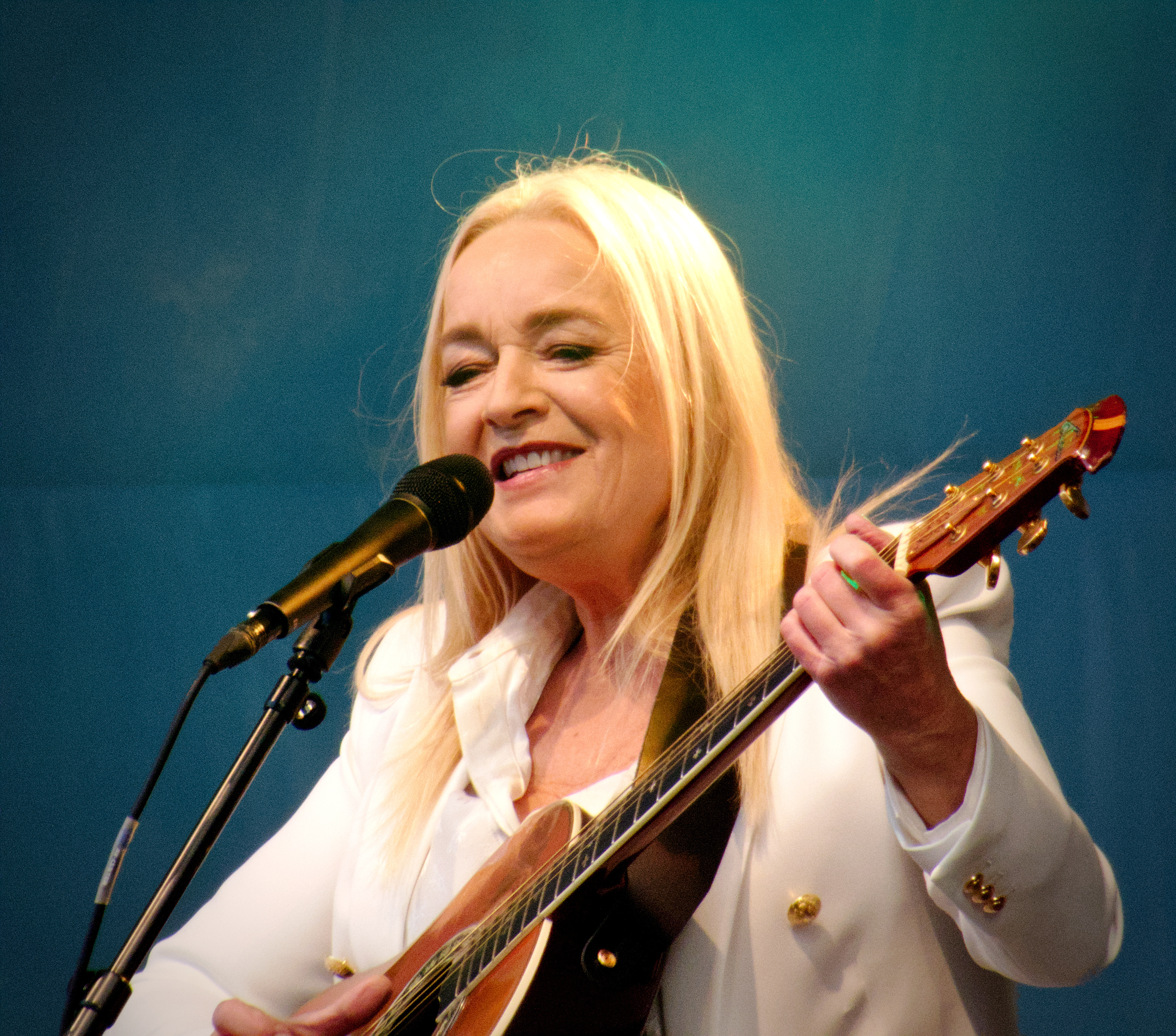
- Anne Linnet in February 2023.

Background information
- Born: 30 July 1953 (age 73); Århus, Denmark
- Genres: Pop, rock, musical, classical music
- Occupations: Musician, author
- Instruments: Vocals, guitar, keyboard, piano
- Years active: 1969 – present

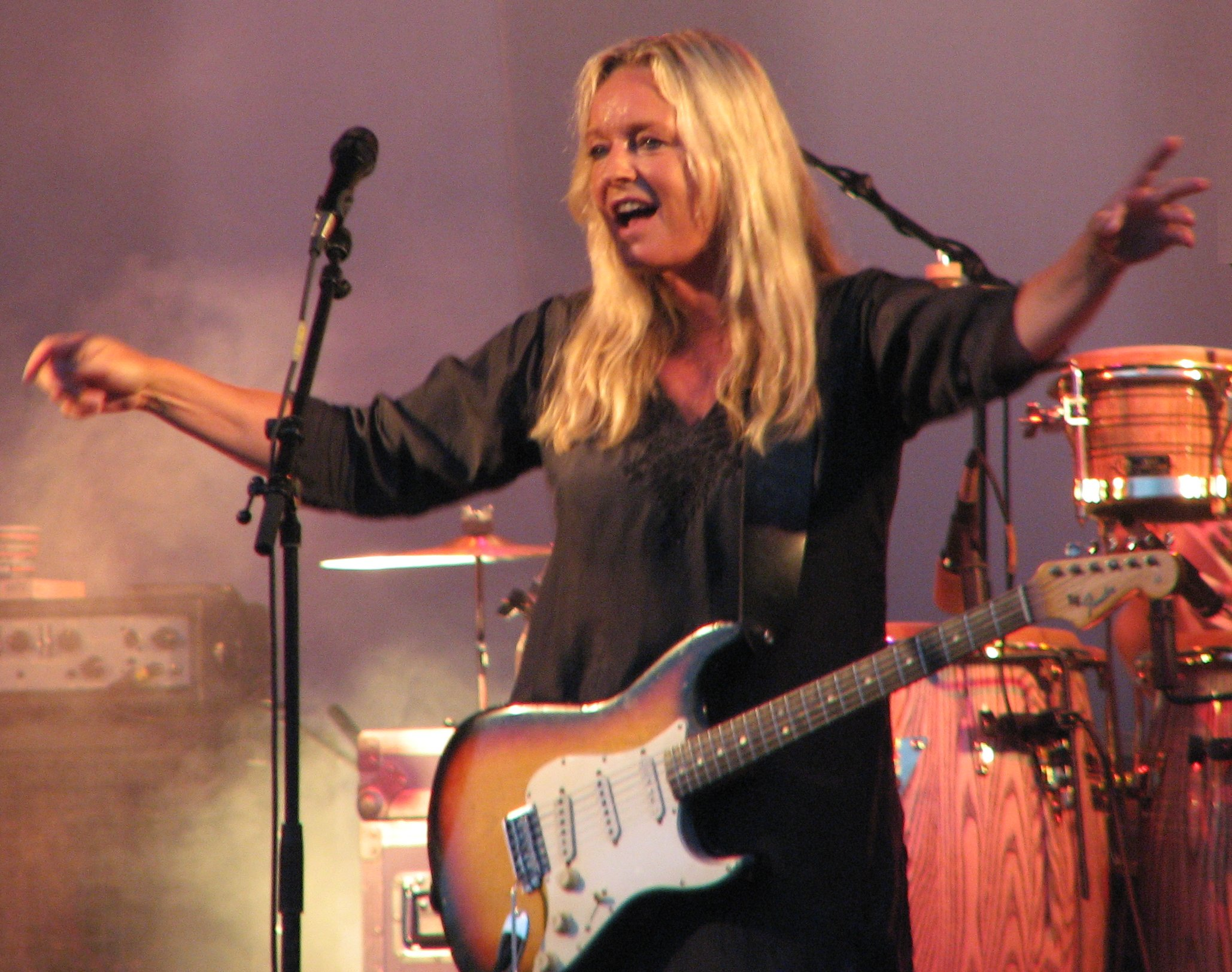
Anne Linnet during a concert in 2006.

Anne Kristine Linnet (born 30 July 1953) is a Danish singer, musician and songwriter. She has released a number of solo albums and has also been a member of the bands Tears, Shit & Chanel, Anne Linnet Band, Marquis de Sade and Bitch Boys. Anne Linnet is one of a small group of Danish songstresses who have been popular for multiple decades. She is, and has been for five decades, a distinctive figure on the Danish music scene and is known for her characteristic musical phrasings, memorable lyrics, and renewal through explorations into a number of music styles.

Linnet is a pioneer of female rock and has received several Danish awards, is Knight of the Dannebrog and is granted subsidies from the Danish Arts Foundation. Furthermore, she has received notability in Denmark for being outspoken about her bisexuality.

== Career ==
Anne Linnet began her career in 1969 by performing folk rock, and she was in the Århus-based band Tears from 1971 to 1976. Linnet recorded the albums Sweet Thing (often regarded as her solo album) and Tears in My Ears, both with the band Tears that also included Holger Laumann. Anne Linnet also sang musical works by Holger Laumann with Radioens Big Band and others for some time since 1971. In 1973, she was one of the founding members of the all-female band Shit & Chanel, which released four albums in their seven years together. One of their largest hits was the song "Smuk og dejlig" (Danish for "gorgeous and lovely"), written by Anne Linnet and it was actually about her crush on the Danish actress Ulla Henningsen. One of the reasons for the band's split was that the House of Chanel had won a lawsuit against them, regarding the use of the name Chanel. After that, the band members felt a need to move on and do something new.

Following the split, Anne Linnet formed Anne Linnet Band, which released two albums from 1981 to 1982. Two other singers and musicians in the band were Sanne Salomonsen and Lis Sørensen, both popular singers/musicians who have since had long and successful careers.

In 1983, a collection of poems by Anne Linnet were published named Glimt. In 1983, she also formed a new wave band named Marquis de Sade and they released an album of the same name that year. The sound was harder and more electronic, inspired by other European eighties bands, such as Eurythmics, and was a change from the softer pop/folk sound that had characterised her music until then. The musical theme and lyrics of Marquis de Sade centered on gender inequality and sadomasochism were also inspired by Hamburg's red-light district, which Anne Linnet Band had encountered during a tour. The album Linnet/Salomonsen from 1984 was the music for a play in Bellevue Teatret named Berlin 84, and was inspired by Toula and Barbarella who worked in a red-light district. The lyrics of Linnet/Salomonsen deal with issues of LGBT erasure and male privilege, and the album has similar themes to Marquis de Sade. Marquis de Sade released Hvid magi in 1985 and En elsker in 1986. At the time, they created some controversy, and became known for some of their songs having sadomasochistic ("Marquis de Sade") and lesbian ("Hils din mor", "Venus") themes. They had large hits with songs such as "Glor på vinduer", "Nattog" and "Venus".

In 1986, Anne Linnet released the song "Barndommens gade" for the film Early Spring, both based on the novel Barndommens gade by the Danish poet Tove Ditlevsen. Linnet set a number of Tove Ditlevsen's poems from this novel to music, which was released on the album Barndommens gade that year. The song of the same name became a hit and received the Robert Award for film score of the year. Linnet founded the record company Pladecompagniet at the turn of the year 1986/1987.

In 1988, Linnet released the album Jeg er jo lige her (Danish for "I am (after all) right here"). The album has sold in more than 400,000 copies, which makes it her commercial high point. The first single was the evergreen "Tusind stykker" (Danish for "thousand pieces"), which became a large hit, first in Anne Linnet's version, and later also in a Swedish version, performed by the Swedish singer and musician Björn Afzelius. In 1989, she released the album Min sang in collaboration with the Danish priest, author and lecturer Johannes Møllehave. The album contains poems inspired by Christian faith. Linnet and Møllehave have later collaborated on a series of church concerts and lectures.

In 1994, the record company Pladecompagniet was sold to Sony for more than ten million kroner. In 1994-'95, Linnet wrote a chamber opera named Thorvaldsen while she was resident in Rome. The opera was released on CD in 1996 and is about the Danish, 19th-century sculptor Bertel Thorvaldsen. In 1997, Linnet established her second all-female band Bitch Boys that released an album of the same name that year. In 1999, Linnet founded her second record company Circle Records, and the first part of her memoir named Hvor kommer drømmene fra? was published the same year. Four short children's books by Anne Linnet about Ivan the dog were released in 2000.

The album Over mig under mig by Marquis de Sade was released in 2002. All releases from Marquis de Sade have the name Anne Linnet on the cover, which is exemplified on this release with "Anne Linnet & Marquis de Sade". In 2006, she had a showing of her oil paintings in Rundetårn, Copenhagen. The same year, her song from Shit & Chanel named "Smuk og dejlig" (1976), was included in the Danish Culture Canon under the heading "Evergreens". Her album Go' sønda' morn' (1980) was included in the same canon under the category "Children's culture". In 2007, she released the critically acclaimed solo album Akvarium which became a success and reached first place on the Danish record chart.

In 2012, the second part of Anne Linnet's memoir named Testamentet was published. On 20 August 2012, it was announced that Linnet would replace Cutfather as a judge on X Factor for its sixth season, joining Thomas Blachman and fellow new judge Ida Corr (who replaced Pernille Rosendahl). She mentored the Groups category and came in third place with Wasteland. For unknown reasons, Linnet did not return as a judge for the seventh season and was replaced by original judge Remee.

== Personal life ==
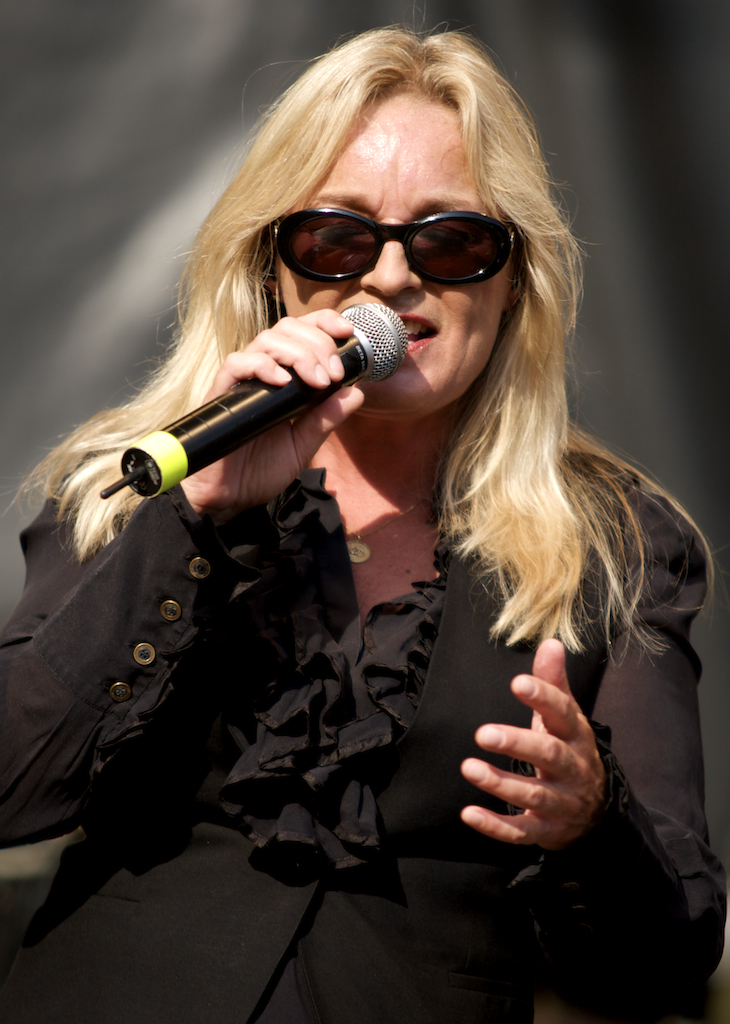
Anne Linnet, Nibe Festival 2009.

Anne Linnet passed her studentereksamen at Århus Statsgymnasium (A-level equivalent) and went on to obtain a degree from the Royal Academy of Music, Århus. She is a bisexual and has been in a romantic relationship with both males and females. From 1974 to 1985, she was married to the jazz musician Holger Laumann, whom she had lived together with since 1971. They had two children; Eva (Evamaria) and Jan Martin (Sean), now named Marcus. Anne Linnet's grief from the aftermath of her father's death from a blood clot in 1979 at age 58, as well as the divorce from Laumann in 1985 left her in shambles, she described to the magazine Gaffa in 2015, where she also stated: "The processing of grief in Marquis de Sade was a bit like this: if you pinch your arm so that it hurts, you don't feel so much that it also hurts somewhere else. It is often the case that other pain can trigger a kind of standstill in relation to the original grief."

Linnet is also the mother of Alexander Theo Linnet, whom she had with Mads Buhl Nielsen in 1988. On 6 June 2010, BT reported that Anne Linnet had signed a partnership and awaited children with 22-year-old Tessa Franck. On 31 July 2010, Tessa Franck Linnet gave birth to a daughter named Isolde Elisabeth Franck Linnet. Alexander followed a musical life like his mother and is known as Xander and his single "Det burde ikk være sådan her" topped the Danish Singles Charts in 2011. Linnet also has two adopted Romanian-born children, Peter and Maria. On 19 April 2013, Tessa gave birth to a boy named Nemo. In December 2013, Anne Linnet announced that the couple had separated. Anne Linnet married 38 years younger Kathrine Kjær, whom she had been in a relationship with since 2017. They were divorced in 2022.

Linnet has been involved in a long-running public dispute concerning the private use of space designated for public access along the Copenhagen waterfront. In the summer of 2026, Linnet was ordered by the Danish Planning Appeals Board to remove a hedge enclosing a small section of the harbourfront by her home on Holmen, along the canal near Danneskiold-Samsøes Allé. Under the local development plan adopted by Copenhagen Municipality, the public must have free access to walk along the waterfront, and the hedge and garden gate were therefore deemed to constitute an unlawful obstruction.

== Discography ==
=== Studio albums ===
- Sweet Thing (Artist, 1973)
- Anne Linnet (Abra Cadabra Production, 1975)
- Kvindesind (Exlibris, 1977)
- You're Crazy (Better Day Records, 1980)
- Go' sønda' morn' (Better Day Records, 1980)
- Roserne bryder ud (CBS Records, 1981)
- Marquis de Sade (CBS Records, 1983)
- Linnet/Salomonsen (CBS Records, 1984)
- Hvid magi (CBS Records, 1985)
- En elsker (CBS Records, 1986)
- Barndommens gade (CBS Records, 1986)
- Jeg er jo lige her (Pladecompagniet, 1988)
- Min sang (Pladecompagniet, 1989)
- Spring Capricious (Pladecompagniet, 1989)
- Krig og kærlighed (Pladecompagniet/Virgin, 1990)
- Det' så dansk (Pladecompagniet, 1992)
- Tal til mig (Pladecompagniet, 1993)
- Pige træd varsomt (Pladecompagniet, 1995)
- Thorvaldsen: En kammeropera af Anne Linnet (Mega Records, 1996)
- Jeg og du (Circle Records, 2001)
- Over mig under mig (Circle Records / Universal Music, 2002)
- Relax No. 1 (Circle Records, 2003)
- Her hos mig (Universal Music, 2005)
- Akvarium (Columbia / Sony BMG Music Entertainment, 2007)
- Anne Linnet (Columbia / Sony BMG Music Entertainment, 2008)
- Linnet's jul (Columbia / Sony Music, 2010)
- Kalder længsel (Columbia / Sony Music, 2012)
- Alle mine drømme til dig (ArtPeople, 2015)
- Sange til livet (Sony Music, 2022)
- Rubiner safirer krystaller (Sony Music, 2024)

=== Singles and EPs ===
- Lyset (Artist, 1971)
- Venner (CBS Records, 1985)
- Hunter and Dear (Universal Music, 2019)
- Vi synger julen ind (Sony Music, 2020)
- Danmark (Sony Music, 2022)

=== Compilations ===
- Univers (CBS Records, 1990)
- Nattog til Venus (Pladecompagniet, 1999)
- Boksen (Sony Music, 2009)
- De bedste (Columbia / Sony Music, 2011)

== Bibliography ==
- Go’ sønda’ morn’ (songbook), 1980
- Glimt (poetry collection), 1983
- Hvor kommer drømmene fra? (memoir), 1999
- Ivan som baby (children's book), 2000
- Ivan i skoven (children's book), 2000
- Ivan på stranden (children's book), 2000
- Ivan & Alexander (children's book), 2000
- Sangbog (songbook), 2011
- Testamentet (memoir), 2012
- Fucked (novel), 2019
