= Lis Sørensen =

Danish singer (born 1955)

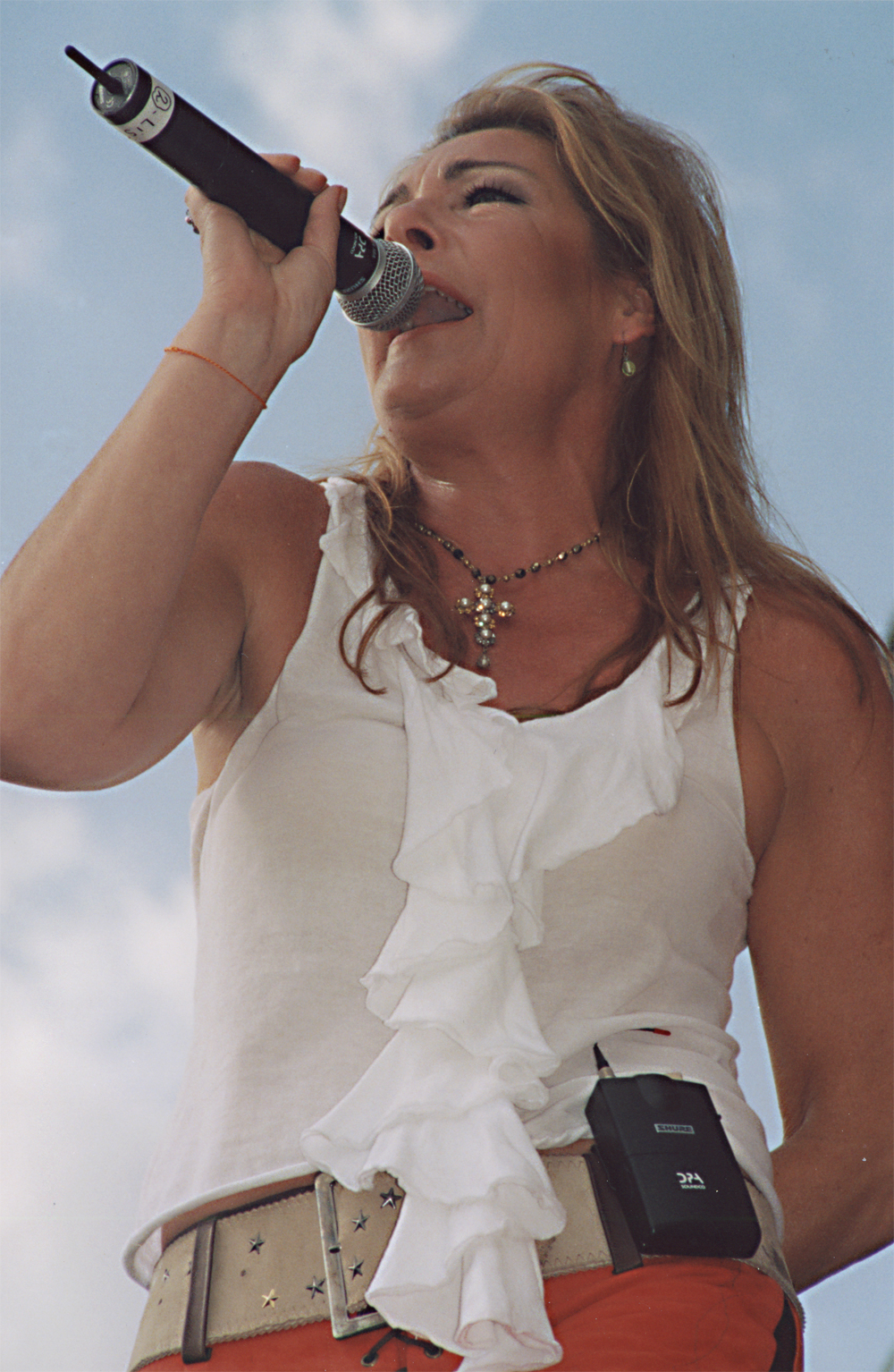
- Lis Sørensen in 2006

Background information
- Born: 28 May 1955 (age 71); Brabrand, Aarhus, Denmark
- Genres: Pop, rock
- Occupations: Singer; songwriter; musician
- Instruments: Vocals; guitar
- Years active: 1970–present
- Formerly of: Shit & Chanel, Anne Linnet Band
- Spouse: Jan Sivertsen (m. 1988; div. 2017)
- Website: lissorensen.dk

Lis Sørensen (born 28 May 1955) is a Danish pop/rock musician, singer, and songwriter. In the 1970s, she worked with Anne Linnet in Shit & Chanel, and they continued in the 1980s with Anne Linnet Band. In 1983, Sørensen released her first solo album. She is also known as the first artist to record the 1993 song "Torn" written, but never recorded, by Ednaswap, which Sørensen retitled "Brændt" (Danish for "Burned"). The song was later made famous by Natalie Imbruglia and Trine Rein.

Lis Sørensen is the mother of Danish songwriter and music producer Sly.

== Career ==
Sørensen's music career began when she recorded an album titled It's So Easy in 1970, with her music teacher Holger Laumann. Laumann was a member of the jazz/rock band Tears. She had her breakthrough at 17 years old.

She was educated in music pedagogy at the Aarhus and Aalborg Royal Academy of Music. Sørensen achieved fame with Shit & Chanel in the 1970s. Shit & Chanel became renowned as the first Danish all-female rock band to achieve a commercial breakthrough in the music industry. Among its admirers were the feminist Red Stocking Movement. However, the band was sued for its use of the Chanel name and had to change its name to Shit & Chalou instead.

Sørensen also sang backing vocals for Gasolin', Sebastian and others. Especially Sebastian also helped Lis Sørensen achieve success in the music industry, since they collaborated on some albums that were popular in Denmark. Anne Linnet Band consisted of the singers Lis Sørensen, Anne Linnet and Sanne Salomonsen, as well as Holger Laumann and others. Anne Linnet Band was a major success in Danish rock history for the few years the band existed.

Following the dissolution of Anne Linnet Band, Sørensen made her debut album as a solo artist Himmelen ned på Jorden in 1983, followed by other solo albums. Lis Sørensen's commercial pinnacle as a solo artist was her album Hjerternes sang from 1989, which has reached sales of 350,000 copies (only surpassed by Sanne Salomonsen with regard to sales of Danish rock albums from 1989).

Sørensen's compilation album Indtil dig igen: Sørensen's bedste was released in 1996, and has reached sales of 170,000 copies. She has also collaborated with Sanne Salomonsen and Tamra Rosanes in the music group Cowgirls, which recorded one album in 2001 named Girls Night Out.

== Discography ==
=== Studio albums ===
Year	Album	Peak positions	Certification
Year	Album	DEN	Certification
1983	Himmelen ned på Jorden		
1985	Lis Sørensen		
1987	Sigøjnerblod		
1989	Hjerternes sang		
1991	Vis dit ansigt		
1993	Under stjernerne et sted		
1995	Du ka' få mig til alt		
1998	Kærtegn		
2000	Rose	7	
2005	Con amor	3	
2010	For kærlighedens skyld	5	
2013	På sådan en morgen	3	Platinum
2017	Bedre tider	3	

=== Compilation albums ===
Year	Title	Peak positions
Year	Title	DEN
1996	Indtil dig igen: Sørensen's bedste	—
1999	Grænseløs Greatest	—
2005	Tæt på Ækvator (Alle tiders)	—
2007	De allerstørste sange	2
2013	På sådan en morgen: De 20 skønneste	—

=== Live albums ===
Year	Title	Peak positions
Year	Title	DEN
2003	Nærvær og næsten	39

=== Singles ===
Year	Title	Peak positions	Album
Year	Title	DEN	Album
2008	"Verden er i farver"	14	
2009	"Lad ikke solen gå ned" (with Basim)	15	Befri dig selv Basim album
