= Shit & Chanel =

Danish girl band

Shit & Chanel (Shit & Chalou)
- Origin: Aarhus, Denmark
- Genres: Pop rock, jazz rock
- Years active: 1974-1979: Shit and Chanel; 1980-1981: Shit & Chalou
- Past members: Anne Linnet; Astrid Elbek; Ulla Tvede Eriksen

Shit & Chanel (in its last year of existence Shit & Chalou) was a Danish all-female band in pop rock and jazz rock established in 1972/1973. The Aarhus-based band was made up of Anne Linnet, Astrid Elbek, Lis Sørensen, Lone Poulsen and Ulla Tvede Eriksen.

== Career ==
In the early 1970s, Anne Linnet used to be in the band Tears along with her husband Holger Laumann. Linnet had the idea of a female band, and Laumann suggested three of his former pupils: Two from Århus Friskole (Århus Free School), Astrid Elbæk and Ulla Tvede Eriksen to join Linnet to form a band. Soon, Lis Sørensen from Engdalskolen in Brabrand also joined in. They practiced at Eriksen's parents house near Brabrand Lake in Aarhus.

In 1975, they took part in the women-only Kvindefestival i Fælledparken in Copenhagen. After black American activist Angela Davis spoke, Shit & Chanel came on stage with an accompanying male band named Delta Blues Band playing for them, which immediately brought protests against the band by liberation movement organizers who had specified that this was an all-women event.

They released their eponymous début album Shit & Chanel that contained "Smuk og dejlig", that became very popular and a classic rock song in Denmark, and subject to many covers including Kulturkanonen in 2006, and Natasja Saad in 2007 just before her death. The last studio album of the band was in 1979.

In 1981, after Chanel threatened to sue the band for the derogative connotations of its adopted name, the band changed its name to Shit & Chalou. The band disbanded one year later, in 1982.

In 2012, a compilation album of their best hits was released, but credited to Shit & Chalou, although all the recordings had been made under Shit & Chanel. The compilation contains the four original albums of the band, a bonus CD with live material and other unreleased material.

== Discography ==
=== Studio albums ===
- 1976: Shit & Chanel
- 1977: Chanel no. 5
- 1978: Tak for sidst
- 1979: Dagen har så mange farver

=== Compilation albums ===
(Both released as Shit & Chalou)

| Year | Album | Peak position | Certification |
| Year | Album | DAN | Certification |
|---|---|---|---|
| 1982 | Shit & Chalou | – | |
| 2012 | Shit og Chalou 1974 - 1982 | 5 | |
