= Magtens Korridorer =

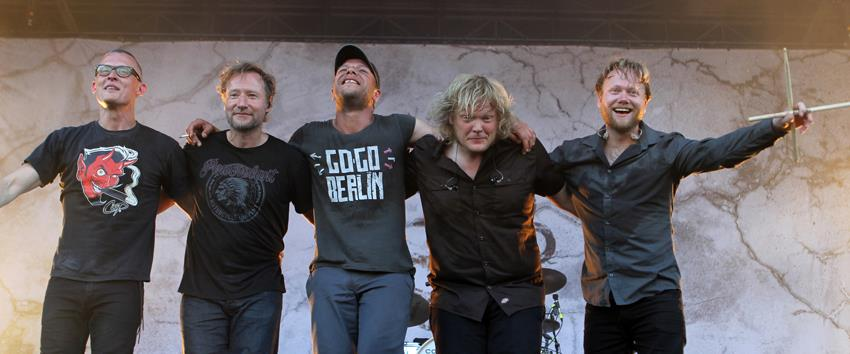
- Magtens Korridorer 21 July 2013. (Photo: Jessica Freiesleben)

Background information
- Origin: Copenhagen, Denmark
- Genres: Rock, Poetic post-punk
- Years active: 1995–Present
- Label: Universal Music
- Members: Johan Olsen; Rasmus Kern; Niklas Schneidermann; Terkel Møhl; Anders Ramhede
- Past members: Peter Bregnsbo; Jacob Ihlemann; Henrik Dylmer
- Website: http://www.magtenskorridorer.dk/

Magtens Korridorer is a band from Denmark which was started in 1995 in Copenhagen, Denmark. The band consists of Johan Olsen (vocals), Rasmus Kern (guitar, synth, samplers and other keys), Niklas Schneidermann (guitar), Terkel Møhl (bass) and Anders Ramhede (drums). The band's work is described as a mixture of rock and poetic post-punk.

== History ==
The band made a demo tape in 1996, which included the song "Hestevisen", which was featured on the hugely popular DR P3 radio show Tæskeholdet. This instantly propelled the band to national stardom, despite not having recorded an album yet.

The band went to the studio and recorded their debut album Bagsiden Af Medaljen in 1998, but the album failed to make a commercial breakthrough. For the following seven years, not much was heard from the band and Terkel, Niklas and Anders joined the band. In 2005, Magtens Korridorer caught the attention of Karrierekanonen, a program for discovering new musical talents in Denmark. That year, the band released the album Friværdi, which was a commercial and critical success. Several singles were released such as "Lorteparforhold", "Picnic (på Kastellet)", "Nordhavn Station" and "Sara har..."

Frontman Olsen is also a Ph.D. in molecular biology, and he teaches at the University of Copenhagen.

Magtens Korridorer opened Orange Stage at the 2006 Roskilde Festival.

Johan Olsen hosted a radio show on DR P3 during the summer of 2007 called Summer School.

== Discography ==
=== Albums ===
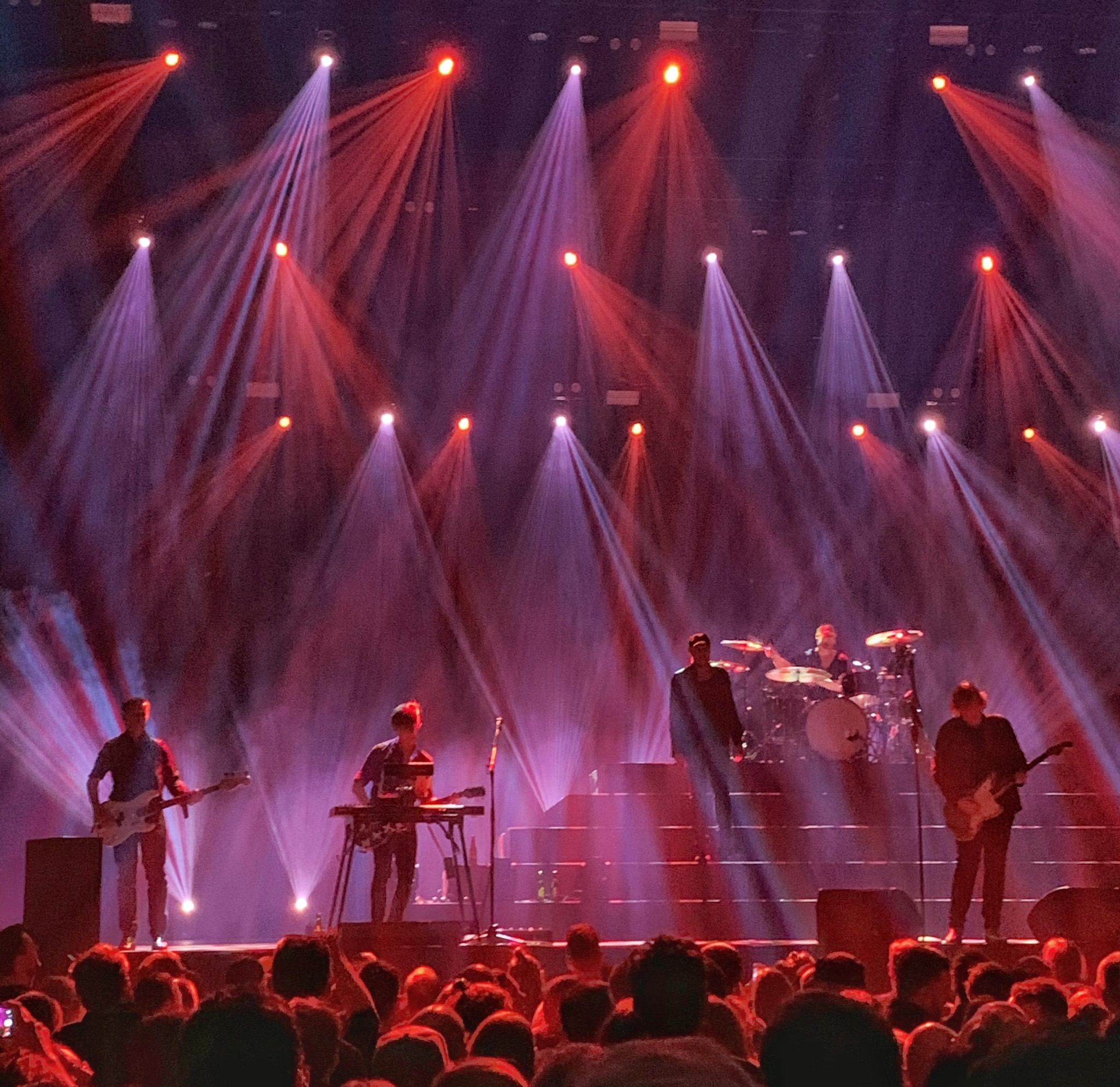
Magtens Korridorer performing live in 2019

Year	Album	Peak Position	Certifications
Year	Album	DAN	Certifications
1998	Bagsiden af medaljen	—	
2005	Friværdi	11	Platinum
2007	Det krøllede håb	2	Gold
2009	Milan Allé	3	Gold
2011	Imperiet falder	2	Gold
2012	Spil noget vi kender!	3	
2014	Før alting bliver nat	2	
2018	Halvt til helt	4	
2021	Club Promise	2	
2026	I kolde stjerners lys	4	
"—" denotes a release that did not chart.

Other live albums

- 2003: Magtens Korridorer i Humlebyen
- 2003: Stengade Live

=== EPs ===
- 1995: Intet nyt under solen
- 1996: Den første

=== Singles ===
Year	Single	Peak Position	Album
Year	Single	DAN	Album
2007	"Pandora"	22	
2009	"Milan allé"	11	
2011	"Kom og mærk"	36	
2012	"På vej" (feat. Sys Bjerre)	35	
2014	"Giv mig en dag"	14	
2014	"Sorte stråler"	37	
