= Muskelsvindfonden =

Danish non-profit organization

- Founded: 1971
- Founder: Evald Krog
- Type: Non-governmental organization, Non-profit organization
- Location: Aarhus, Denmark
- Region served: Denmark
- Method: Funds collection
- Members: 2600
- Volunteers: 3000
- Website: muskelsvindfonden.dk

Muskelsvindfonden (Lit. Muscular Dystrophy Foundation) is a Danish non-profit organization that strives to find a cure for neuromuscular disorders. Founded in 1971 volunteers and staff nationwide have helped to provide support and resources to those affected.

Muskelsvindfonden is focused on collecting funds for research and to make life more comfortable for people with severe physical handicaps. The organization holds an annual series of concerts across Denmark dubbed Grøn Koncert and holds an annual event for children with Circus Summarum when TV and circus personalities work together to perform for children.
