= Sanne Salomonsen =

Danish singer (born 1955)

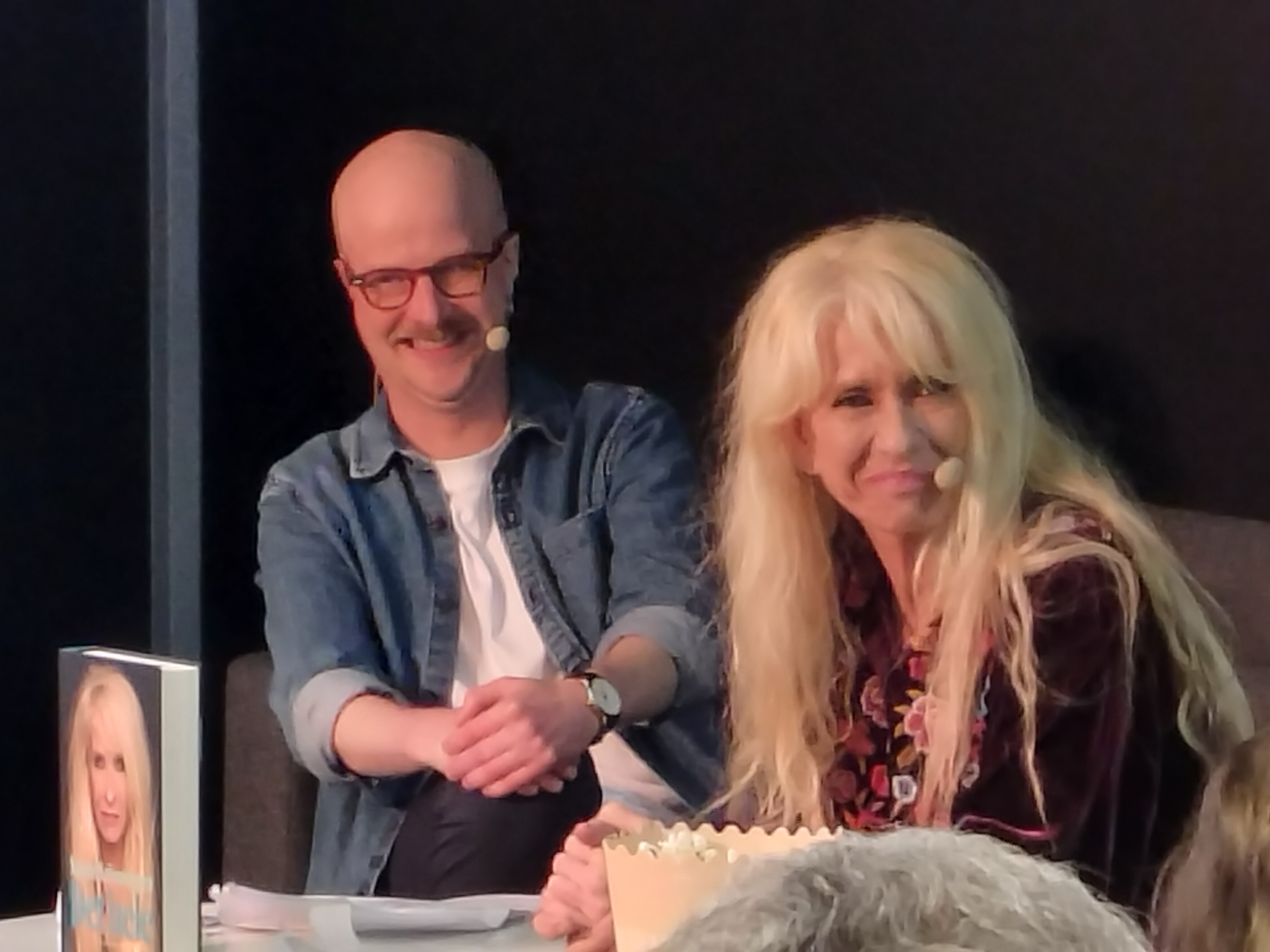
- Salomonsen (to the right) in 2025

Background information
- Born: 30 December 1955 (age 70); Copenhagen, Denmark
- Genres: Pop, rock, jazz, musical theatre, country music
- Occupations: Singer, songwriter
- Years active: 1967–present
- Formerly of: Flair, Anne Linnet Band, Sneakers

Susanne Salomonsen (born on 30 December 1955) is a Danish singer and songwriter, better known under the nickname Sanne Salomonsen. Salomonsen joined a local rock band in 1967, and her first solo album was released in 1973. She became one of the most famous singers in Denmark during the 1980s. Various songs sung or written by her have been on the local charts.

Sanne Salomonsen was a member of Anne Linnet Band and Sneakers, and got the nickname Rock Mama as an enduring pop icon in Danish rock music. She thought at age 31 around the time she got the nickname from a journalist: "When I heard that piece of music [from OneTwo], I thought that now, I have become a mom for a generation in rock music." She said in 2011: "I am always asked what I think about being called Rock Mama, but when I look around on the Danish scene then, I can after all clearly see, that if there is a rock mama then, it is me. That is how it is."

== Life and career ==
=== Early achievements and later stardom ===
Sanne Salomonsen was born in Copenhagen, and her natural hair color is red. She is the daughter of ornithologist Finn Salomonsen. Sanne Salomonsen performed at the age of 6 in the ballet Elves' Hill. She moved to Holte at age 11 with her family. She debuted as singer by joining her first band in 1967, and then the band Curled Edges (with members of the bands Beefeaters, Maxwells and Thors Hammer) in 1968. During 1970 to 1972, she performed in a musical named Touch, as well as Danish versions of the musicals Hair (as Sheila) and Godspell. She was called Lille Sanne Superstar (English: Little Sanne Superstar) by the time her first solo album was being recorded. Sanne Salomonsen's debut album was released in 1973, and she was in the group Flair from 1974 to 1977, and sang backing vocals for Sebastian and others.

Sanne Salomonsen became one of the most famous female rock singers in Denmark, as a member of Anne Linnet Band from 1979 to 1983, and Sneakers from 1979 to 1985 and subsequent commercial success as a solo artist. She became known as Rock Mama at around age 31 after a journalist came up with this nickname. Salomonsen had especially become a Danish pop icon by being the lead vocalist of Sneakers. Notably, her album Sanne from 1989 was the most sold Danish rock album that year.

During the 1980s, Sanne Salomonsen also starred in the movies Forræderne, Smugglarkungen and Svindlande affärer. After Sanne (1989), she continued the solo career with albums, such as Where Blue Begins (1991), Freedom (2003) and The Album (2005). Sanne was also in the country music group Cowgirls with Lis Sørensen and Tamra Rosanes, which released one album named Girls Night Out in 2001. This album sold 40 000 copies.

=== Disease and subsequent comeback ===
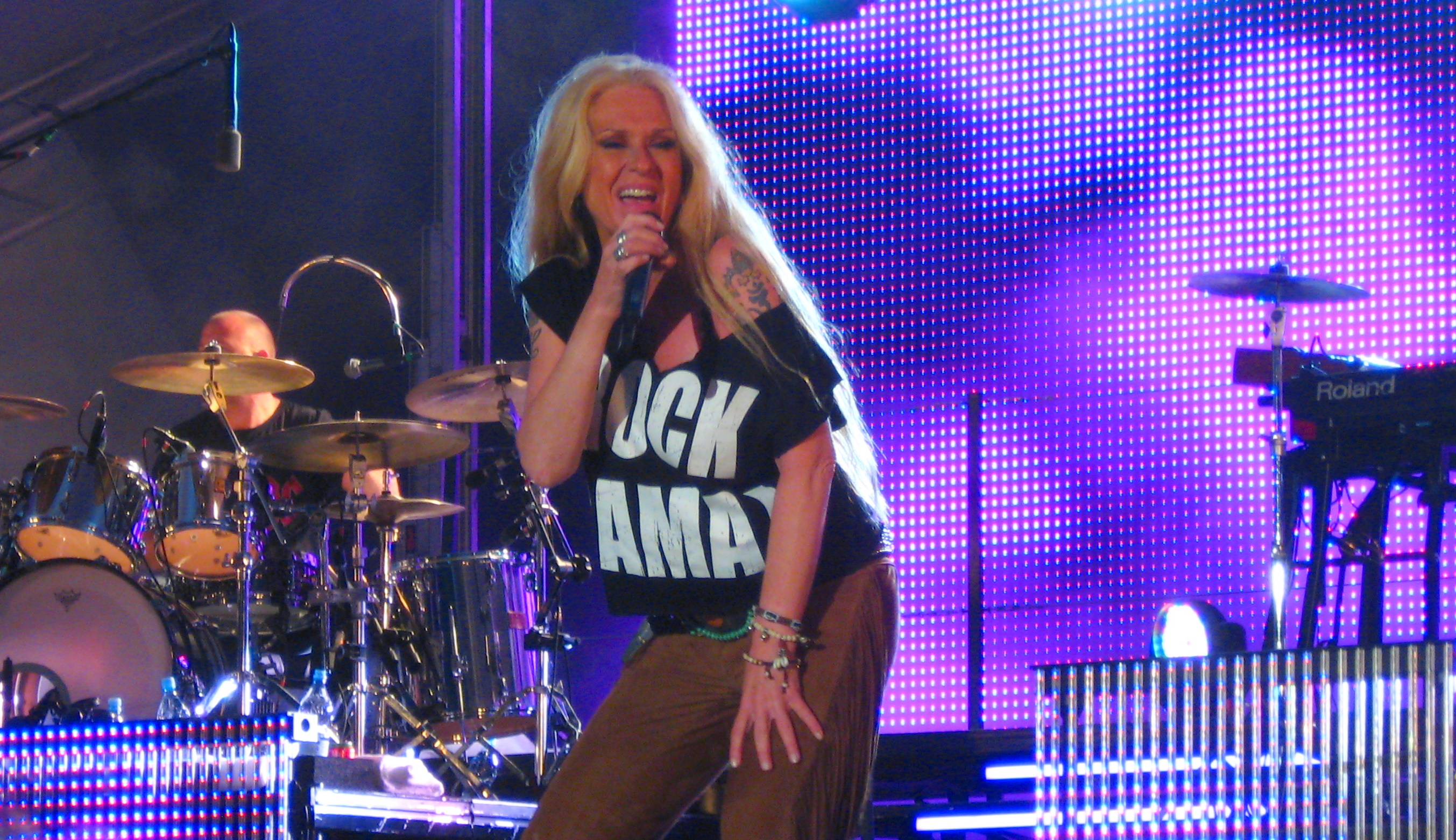
Sanne Salomonsen in Aalborg, 2010.

Sanne Salomonsen had an intracerebral hemorrhage on 5 May 2006 that made her paralyzed on one side of the face and in one arm, and interfered with her ability to speak and sing. She was able to call the ambulance herself, and there was no damage to her personality, except depression that required therapy. After partially recovering from paralysis and arduously being able to retrain her singing voice during the next few years, she got a Sanskrit tattoo on the right forearm that means: "Feel love and gratitude for everything and everyone every day".

Sanne Salomonsen later recounted in a news article, that she had tried to sing "Den jeg elsker elsker jeg" (a song written by her that became a big hit in the 1980s) while lying in the hospital, but could not. The muscles used for singing were paralyzed, she recounted and continued: "I was in distress, but very grateful to be alive at the same time". Her depression lasted ten months, where she struggled with social anxiety. Afterwards, the successful album Unico was released in March 2009, named after Sanne Salomonsen's horse. The album was on the Danish record chart for a year, and about 80 000 copies of the album were sold during the next few years. Unico was the fourth best selling Danish album in 2009.

== Discography ==
=== Studio albums ===
- 1973: Sanne Salomonsen (Label: Sonet) (Language: Danish)
- 1977: Precious Moments (Label: EMI) (Language: English)
- 1979: Hvide manke: Dyrepladen (Label: Elsound) (Language: Danish)
- 1984: Linnet/Salomonsen (Label: CBS) (Language: Danish)
- 1985: Sanne Salomonsen (Label: Virgin) (Language: Danish)
- 1987: Ingen engel (Label: Virgin) (Language: Danish)
- 1987: No Angel (Label: Virgin) (Language: English)
- 1989: Sanne (Label: Virgin) (Language: Danish)
- 1990: Love Is Gonna Call (Label: Virgin) (Language: English)
- 1990: Krig og kærlighed (Label: Pladecompagniet) (Language: Danish)
- 1991: Where Blue Begins (Label: Virgin) (Language: English)
- 1994: Language of the Heart (Label: Virgin) (Language: English)
- 1996: 1996 (Label: Virgin) (Language: Danish)
- 1996: 1996 (Label: Virgin) (Language: English)
- 1998: In a New York Minute (Label: Virgin) (Language: English)
- 2001: Evita (Label: Virgin) (Language: Danish)
- 2003: Freedom (Label: Medley Records) (Language: English)
- 2005: The Album (Label: Copenhagen Records) (Language: English)
- 2009: Unico (Label: Mermaid Records) (Language: Danish)
- 2011: Tiden brænder (Label: Mermaid Records) (Language: Danish)
- 2014: Hjem 2014 (Label: Mermaid Records) (Language: Danish)
- 2017: Baby Blue (Label: Mermaid Records) (Language: Danish)

=== Live albums ===
- 1994: Unplugged (Label: Virgin) (Language: Danish/English)
- 2005: The Show (Label: Copenhagen Records) (Language: Danish/English)

=== Compilations ===
- 2000: De bedste af de bedste (Label: Virgin) (Language: Danish/English) released same year in Sweden as Sannes bästa
- 2000: De bedste af de bedste vol. 2 (Label: Virgin) (Language: Danish/English) released same year in Sweden as Sannes bästa vol. 2
- 2006: The Hits (Label: Virgin) (Language: Danish/English)
- 2009: Sanne Salomonsen: 8 originale studio albums (Label: EMI) (Language: Danish/English)

== Filmography ==
- 1974: Mellemspil
- 1974: Den stjålne brud
- 1983: Forræderne
- 1985: Smugglarkungen
- 1985: Svindlande affärer
- 2005: The Show
- 2005: Sanne: Et portræt af hele Danmarks rock-mama
- 2010: Parterapi
- 2019: Valhalla
