= Big Fat Snake =

Danish pop/rock band

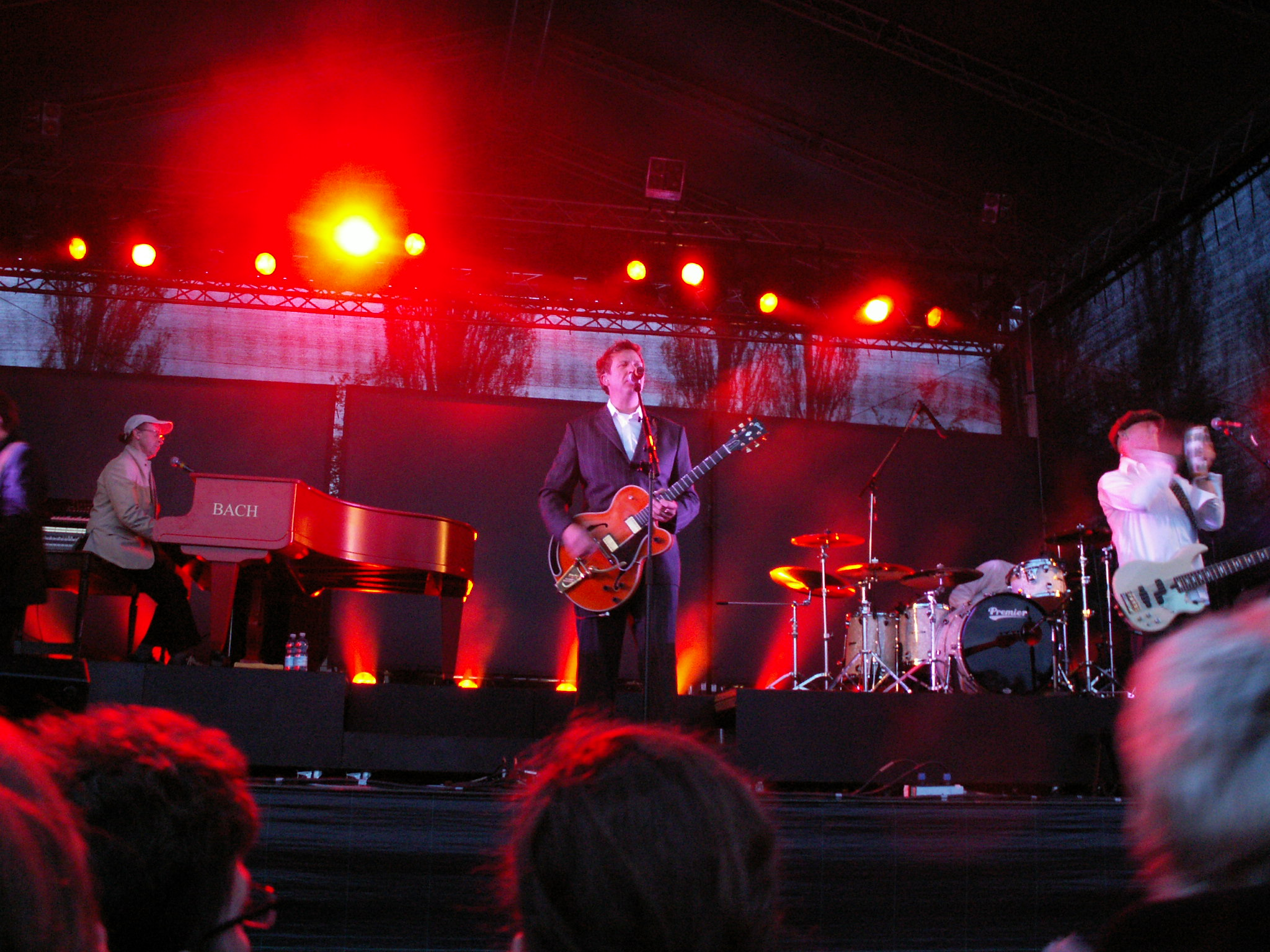
- Big Fat Snake in Odense, 2005

Background information
- Genres: Pop, rock
- Years active: 1990–present
- Members: Anders Blichfeldt; Asger Steenholdt; Jens Fredslund; Pete Repete (Peter Sørensen); Morten Jakobsen
- Past members: Peter Viskinde; Jacob Perbøll; Holger Kølle
- Website: bigfatsnake.com

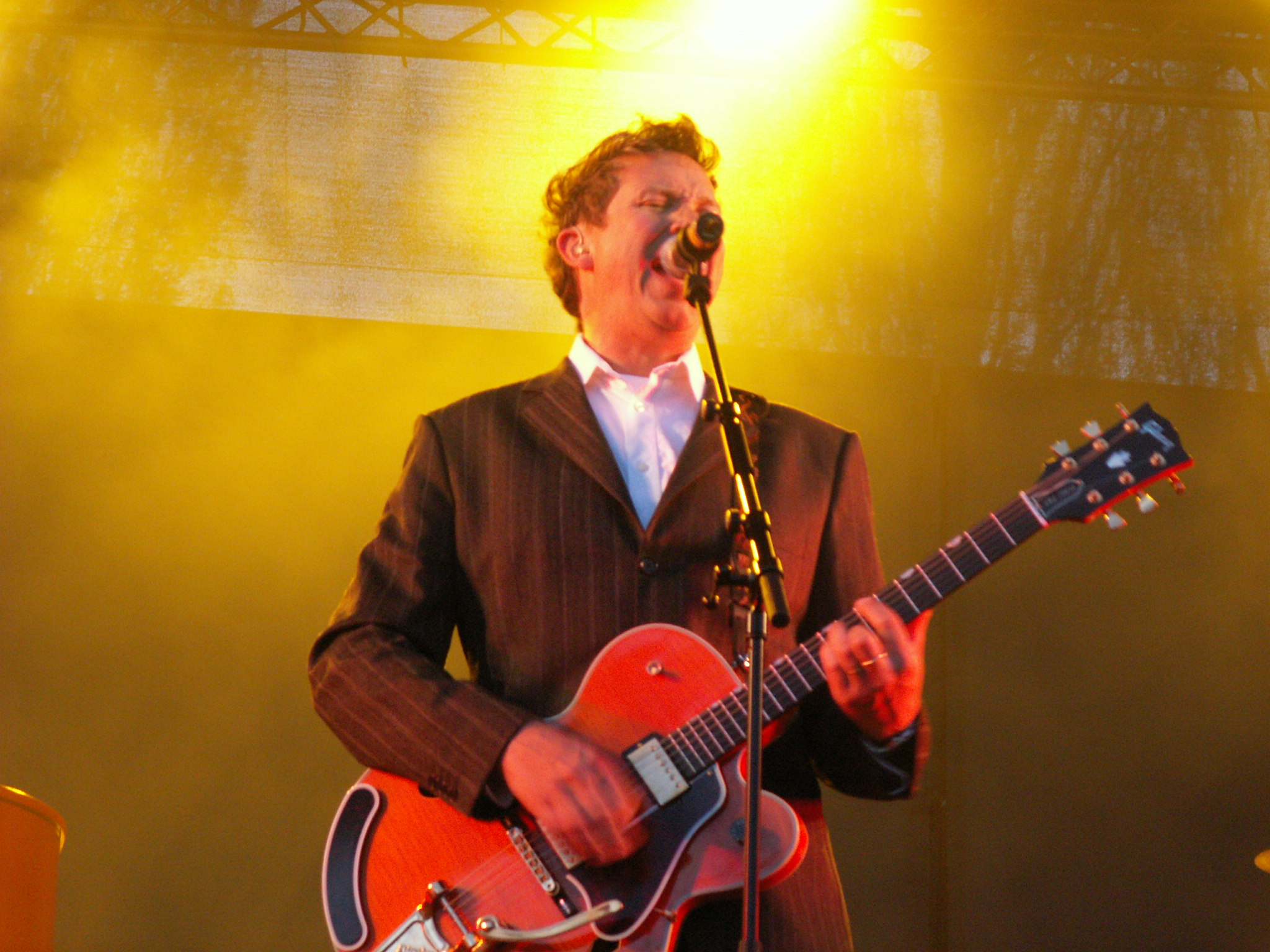
Lead singer Anders Blichfeldt

Big Fat Snake is a Danish pop/rock music group that was founded in 1990.

Peter Viskinde and Anders Blichfeldt first met in 1988 for the recording of a demo tape for the band "The Werners" that later changed name to "Verners Verdensorkester" ("Verner's World Orchestra"). The band soon fell apart due to lack of audience. They later formed a new band named after the lyrics of the Bob Dylan song "Wiggle Wiggle" and released their first album Big Fat Snake in 1991. Throughout the '90s, they released several records and built up a devoted audience in Denmark.

In 1997, the band's original bass player, Jacob Perbøll, quit the band and was replaced by Asger Steenholdt. In 2003 they recorded a live album, "One Night of Sin", together with the original Elvis Presley TCB Band and The Sweet Inspirations.

On 3 March 2009, it was announced that Peter Viskinde had left the band due to disagreements with the other bands members; in particular, lead singer Anders Blichfeldt. Viskinde then released the album Reel 1 under the Big Fat Snake name, claiming he owned the rights to it. A period of media war ensued, during which there existed two bands with the name. On 16 June 2009, the band name was given to the original band members in an out-of-court settlement, where Viskinde agreed to use another name for his new band. He chose the name Sheriff.

== Current members ==
- Anders Blichfeldt (1990–) vocals and guitar
- Pete Repete (1992–) keyboard
- Jens Fredslund (1992–) drums
- Asger J. Steenholdt (1997–2009) bass (2009–) guitar
- Morten Jay Jakobsen (2009–) bass

=== Former members ===
- Peter Viskinde (1990–2009) (died 2021) vocals and guitar
- Jacob Perbøll (1990–1997) bass
- Holger Kølle (1990–1992) drums

== Discography ==
=== Albums ===
- 1991: Big Fat Snake
- 1992: Born Lucky
- 1994: Beautiful Thing
- 1995: Midnight Mission
- 1996: Fight for Your Love
- 1996: Big Boys in Red & White
- 1997: Flames
- 1998: bigfatsnake.com

Year	Album	Peak positions	Certification
Year	Album	DEN	Certification
2000	Running Man	34	
2002	Play it By Ear	2	
2003	One Night of Sin	1	
2004	More Fire	1	IFPI DEN: 2× Platinum
2005	The Box	2	
2006	Between the Devil and the Big Blue Sea	1	IFPI DEN: Gold
2007	Nu	3	IFPI DEN: Gold
2009	What is Left is Right	1	
2011	Come Closer	3	IFPI DEN: Gold
2014	Idocrazy	2	

Live albums

Year	Album	Peak positions	Certification
Year	Album	DEN	Certification
2001	Live	–	
2013	Midnight Hour (Live)	9	

Compilation albums

- 1999: Recycled

Others

- 1996: JBL Power Performance (released by JBL/Harman Group as a promotion for their sound systems)
- 1998: BFS Forever (only released in Asia)
- 2009: Reel 1 (joint Big Fat Snake / Peter Viskinde album) (Peak DEN: #9)
