= Outlandish discography =

This article presents the discography of Outlandish, a Danish hip-hop group.

== Albums ==
=== Studio albums ===
Year	Album	Peak chart positions							Sales	Certifications
Year	Album	DEN	AUT	FIN	GER	NLD	SWE	SWI	Sales	Certifications
2000	Outland's Official: Released: 3 May 2000; Label: RCA, BMG; Formats: CD	19	—	—	—	—	—	—		
2002	Bread & Barrels of Water: Released: 9 September 2002; Label: RCA, BMG; Formats: CD, digital download	1	14	16	10	24	14	11	Worldwide: 250,000	DEN: Platinum
2005	Closer Than Veins: Released: 31 October 2005; Label: RCA, Sony BMG; Formats: CD, digital download	3	—	—	—	—	—	—		DEN: Platinum
2009	Sound of a Rebel: Released: 11 May 2009; Label: RCA, Sony Music; Formats: CD, digital download	5	—	—	—	—	—	—		DEN: Gold
2012	Warrior // Worrier: Released: 28 May 2012; Label: RCA, Sony Music; Formats: CD, digital download	2	—	—	—	—	—	—		DEN: Gold
2023	The Cornershop Carnival: Released: 27 October 2023; Label: Outland Music; Formats: CD, digital download									

=== Compilation albums ===
Year	Album
2004	Beats, Rhymes & Life: Released: 21 May 2004; Label: Outcaste Records; Formats: CD

== Singles ==
Year	Title	Peak chart positions										Certifications	Album
Year	Title	DEN	AUT	BEL	FIN	GER	NLD	NOR	SWE	SWI	UK	Certifications	Album
2000	"Walou"	—	—	5	—	72	27	—	35	—	197		Outland's Official
2002	"Guantanamo"	1	49	—	—	31	84	19	33	34	31		Bread & Barrels of Water
2002	"Gritty"	—	—	—	—	—	—	—	—	—	—		Bread & Barrels of Water
2003	"Aicha"	—	3	8	—	1	2	3	1	1	—	AUT: Gold; DEN: Gold; GER: Gold; NOR: Gold; SWI: Gold	Bread & Barrels of Water
2004	"Man binder os på mund og hånd"	2	—	—	—	—	—	—	—	—	—		non-album single
2005	"Look into My Eyes"	—	—	—	—	—	—	—	—	—	—	DEN: Gold	Closer Than Veins
2006	"Kom Igen" (featuring U$O)	—	—	—	—	—	—	—	—	—	—		Closer Than Veins
2006	"I Only Ask of God"	—	—	—	—	—	—	—	—	—	—	DEN: Platin	Closer Than Veins
2006	"Callin' U"	—	—	—	—	—	—	—	—	—	—		Closer Than Veins
2006	"In Good Hands"	—	—	—	—	—	—	—	—	—	—		Closer Than Veins
2006	"Angels Lower Their Wings"	—	—	—	—	—	—	—	—	—	—		Closer Than Veins
2009	"Rock All Day"	30	—	—	—	—	—	—	—	—	—		Sound of a Rebel
2009	"Feels Like Saving the World"	17	—	—	—	—	—	—	—	—	—		Sound of a Rebel
2010	"Let Off Some Steam"	—	—	—	—	—	—	—	—	—	—		Sound of a Rebel
2010	"After Every Rainfall Must Come a Rainbow"	—	—	—	—	—	—	—	—	—	—		non-album single
2011	"TriumF" (featuring Providers)	—	—	—	—	—	—	—	—	—	—		Warrior//Worrier
2012	"Warrior//Worrier"	3	—	—	—	—	36	—	—	—	—	DEN: Platinum	Warrior//Worrier
2012	"Ready to Love"	—	—	—	—	—	—	—	—	—	—		Warrior//Worrier
2013	"A Mind Full of Whispers"	—	—	—	—	—	—	—	—	—	—		Warrior//Worrier
2016	"My Old Man"	—	—	—	—	—	—	—	—	—	—		non-album single
"—" denotes releases that did not chart.

=== As featured artist ===
Year	Title	Peak chart positions	Certifications	Album
Year	Title	DEN	Certifications	Album
2010	"Desert Walk" (Kato featuring Outlandish)	4	DEN: Gold	Discolized
"—" denotes releases that did not chart.
