= Alex (singer) =

Danish singer- songwriter (born 1978)

Alex Ambrose (born 31 May 1978) is a Danish singer, songwriter and actor. As a soloist, he is better known by his first name Alex.

Alex Ambrose was born in Brøndbyøster, Brøndby Municipality (a suburb of Copenhagen) and grew up in a musical family. He was working as a teaching assistant when he took part in the talent contest Popstars on TV 2 in 2002. But he left the competition prematurely because he did not want to go in the same musical direction as it was expected of the winner.

In summer 2005 he became part of the group J.A.Z. (consisting of Alex Ambrose and his siblings, Marc Johnson and Johnson's sister Zindy Laursen) single "Ingen gør som vi gør". He sang the theme song for the Danish reality series Paradise Hotel in 2005 and aired on TV 3 and he took part in producing and singing in the song "Hvad nu hvis" (What if in English) as charity for UNICEF, along with Nik & Jay.

With the release of the album Ta' det tilbage, Alex changed from singing in English to singing in Danish. In 2008 he released "Din dag" through independent record label 13Beats.

== Discography ==
=== Albums ===
- 2003: Thirteen
- 2006: Ta' det tilbage

=== Singles ===
- 2003: "Them girls"
- 2003: "Hola"
- 2003: "So Beautiful"
- 2005: "Ingen gør som vi gør" (with J.A.Z.)
- 2005: "Paradise" (from reality show Paradise Hotel)
- 2005: "Os to"
- 2006: "Lever for dig (feat. Wendy Wonder & Ras Money)
- 2006: "Ta' det tilbage"
- 2006: "Jeg ser dig" (feat. Johnson)
- 2007: "Hvad nu hvis" (feat. Nik & Jay) - charity single for Unicef
- 2008: "Din dag" (feat. Søvnig)
- 2013: "Vi flyver"

=== Guest appearances in albums ===
- 2004: Årgang 79 - Niarn
- 2005: Mit første album - Gettic
- 2005: Gigolo Jesus - Jokeren
- 2005: Min tid - Mortito
- 2005: Release - Natasja
- 2005: Forklædt som voksen - Troo.L.S & Orgi-E
- 2006: Ingen som os - UFO Yepha
- 2006: Det passer - Johnson
- 2007: Første kapitel - NEMO
