= Marwan (rapper) =

Danish-Palestinian rapper

Muhamed Marwan (in Arabic محمد مروان) better known as just Marwan (born 1980) is a Danish-Palestinian rapper. Formerly known as SLP (Statsløs Palæstinenser, literally Stateless Palestinian), he also belongs to the Aarhus crew Pimp-A-Lot.

As a 10-year-old, Marwan came to Denmark from Saudi Arabia, he grew up in Aarhus. He has been writing rap songs since 2000 and starred, among other things, Pimp-A-Lot releases "Uden om systemet" in 2001 and "I er selv uden om det" in 2003.

Marwan released his debut album P.E.R.K.E.R. on the Danish indie record label Tabu Records. The album was produced by Tabu Records Lounge Lizzard and Marwan's main producer, Abu Malek. He followed it up in 2011 with the album Mennesker on the same label.

He is in Full Impact Productions (F.I.P.) or Full Impact Productions Gangsta Clique (F.I.P.G.C.).

After three years of silence since the album "Marwan", Marwan released the single "Århus V Veteran" with L.O.C. on 17 February 2017.

Marwan started together with Michel Svane (Drums/producer) and Søren Bendz (Guitar), the band SortHandsk in 2019. They released the album "SortHandsk" on 17/09/2021.

The album was recorded, mixed and mastered by Tue Madsen at Antfarm Studios.

The critically acclaimed album led to live concerts at Spot Festival, Copenhell and SmukFest.

== Discography ==
=== Albums ===
Year	Album	Peak positions	Certification	Notes
Year	Album	DEN	Certification	Notes
2007	P.E.R.K.E.R.	–		Track list: 1. "Ruller op" feat. Troo.L.S; 2. "Selvgjort, Velgjort"; 3. "Holder jeres øre åben /Fjern sporet" 4. "Sten i hans hånd" 5. "Hva' så hvad" feat. Suspekt; 6. "Hva' du ude på?" 7. "P.E.R.K.E.R."; 8. "Min blok" 9. "Intet håb" 10. "Regel #1" feat. U$O and L.O.C.; 11. "Du skylder" feat. Suspekt; 12. "Det Os"; 13. "Kom forbi" 14. "Sten i hans hånd" (remix feat. D.R)
2011	Mennesker	40		Track list: 1. "Mennesker"; 2. "Historien"; 3. "Drama"; 4. "Hvis du ser morgen" 5. "Fri"; 6. "Blod er tykkere end vand" 7. "Du gør en rig mand fattig" feat. Bai-D; 8. "Kærlighed & døden" 9. "Korrupte politi" 10. "Uden om systemet" feat. Troo.L.S & Orgi-E; 11. "Myldretid"; 12. "På vej ned" feat. L.O.C.; 13. "Det går godt"
2014	Marwan	14		Track list: 1. "Intro" (3:20); 2. "Økologisk" (2:53); 3. "ButterBombay" (3:40); 4. "Hov" (8:21); 5. "Vi vågner når vi dør (feat. Jooks) (4:11); 6. "Vænner mig ikk' til det (feat. Just) (3:46); 7. "Maui" (8:16); 8. "Søvnløs" (3:27); 9. "Gennemsigtig" (feat. Troo.L.S) (3:27); 10. "Uden om systemet (feat. S!vas) (4:11); 11. "Min vej (feat. L.O.C. & U$O) (3:40); 12. "Lyst for oven" (feat. Xander) (4:29)
