= Nej til knive =

Campaign against using knives and weapons in Danish nightclubs

Nej til knive (full title Nej til knive i nattelivet meaning "No to knives in nightlife" in Danish language) is a widespread awareness campaign in Denmark against using of knives and other deadly weapons in Danish nightclubs. The campaign started in 2010 and a great number of celebrities in entertainment gave their voices shooting brief videos for the campaign including Kenny Aleksandr, Alien Beat Club, Sys Bjerre, Oliver Bjerrehuus, Klaus Bondam, Erik Brandt, Morten Breum, Burhan G, Chapper, Julie Brandt Dam, Kira Eggers, Peter Frödin, Rune Glifberg, Robert Hansen, Hella Joof, Camille Jones, Zeenta Jonsson, Jooks, Sussi la Cour (aka Sussi la Cour), Nikolaj Koppel, Stine Kronborg, Lykke Mai, Michael Maze, Medina, Cyron B. Melville, Nik & Jay, Julie R. Ølgaard, Pharfar, Dan Rachlin, Remee, Karen Rosenberg, Claire Ross-Brown, Maibritt Saerens, Manu Sareen, Frederik Schlütter, Saseline Sørensen, Sukkerchok, Svenstrup & Vendelboe, Villy Søvndal, Stine Ternstrøm, Trisse Thomsen, Tomace, Kim Thurmann and others.
