= All You See =

All You See may refer to:

- "All You See", a 2004 song by En Vogue from Soul Flower
- "All You See", a 2009 song by J. Tillman from Vacilando Territory Blues
- All You See, a 2013 album by Nicolas Kummert with Yves Peeters Group

== See also ==
- All I See (disambiguation)
- All I See Is You (disambiguation)
- "All You See Is", a 2023 song by Algiers from Shook (album)
