= Pimp-A-Lot =

Danish hip hop collective

Pimp-A-Lot stylized as Pimp-A-LOT is a Danish hip-hop/rap collective established in 2000 in Aarhus V, by the Danish rapper Abu Malek.

The Pimp-A-lot crew has included some of the most popular and famous artists on the Danish hip hop scene, notably rappers:

- Johnson (full name Marc Johnson)
- U$O (real name Ausamah Saed)
- L.O.C. (real name Liam O'Connor)
- Marwan (full name Mohamed Marwan)
- Jøden (rapper) (real name Michael Christiansen)
- Player'n
- Cha D (real name Chadi Alderbas)
- Angie

In 2003, the collective released the 23-track album I R Selv Ude Om D on In Tha House Records label.
