= Beats, Rhymes & Life (Outlandish album) =

Presents... Beats, Rhymes & Life

Studio album by Outlandish
- Released: 26 April 2004
- Recorded: Alabama Manhattan
- Genre: Hip hop
- Label: Outcaste

Outlandish chronology
Bread & Barrels Of Water (2002)	Presents... Beats, Rhymes & Life (2004)	Closer Than Veins (2005)

Outlandish Presents... Beats, Rhymes & Life is a collaborative album released in 2004 by Outlandish and featuring collaborations with artists including The Fugees, Nusrat Fateh Ali Khan and Junoon.

== Track listing ==
1. "Walou" (Rishi Rich Remix) (Outlandish)
2. "Vocab" (Fugees)
3. "Respect" (Alliance Ethnik feat. Vinia Mojica)
4. "Past, Present, Future" (Majid)
5. "Chan Chan" (Compay Segundo)
6. "Ya Rayah" (Rachid Taha)
7. "Sohniye" (Juggy D)
8. "Dil Se/Satrangi Re" (AR Rahman)(Sonu Nigam & Kavita Krishnamurthy)(ed.musafirs)
9. "Aicha" (Proper Pak Remix) (Outlandish)
10. "We Are" (DJ Jazzy Jeff feat. Cy Young & Raheem)
11. "Inshallah" (Goodie Mob)
12. "Min Tid" (Petter)
13. "Quien Me Tienda La Mano Al Pas" (Pablo Milanés)
14. "La Maza" (Mercedes Sosa)
15. "Sweet Pain" (Nusrat Fateh Ali Khan)
16. "Ghoom" (Junoon)
