= Reviving the Islamic Spirit =

Islamic conference in Canada

Reviving the Islamic Spirit (RIS) is an annual Islamic conference typically held during the winter holiday season in Toronto, Ontario, Canada.

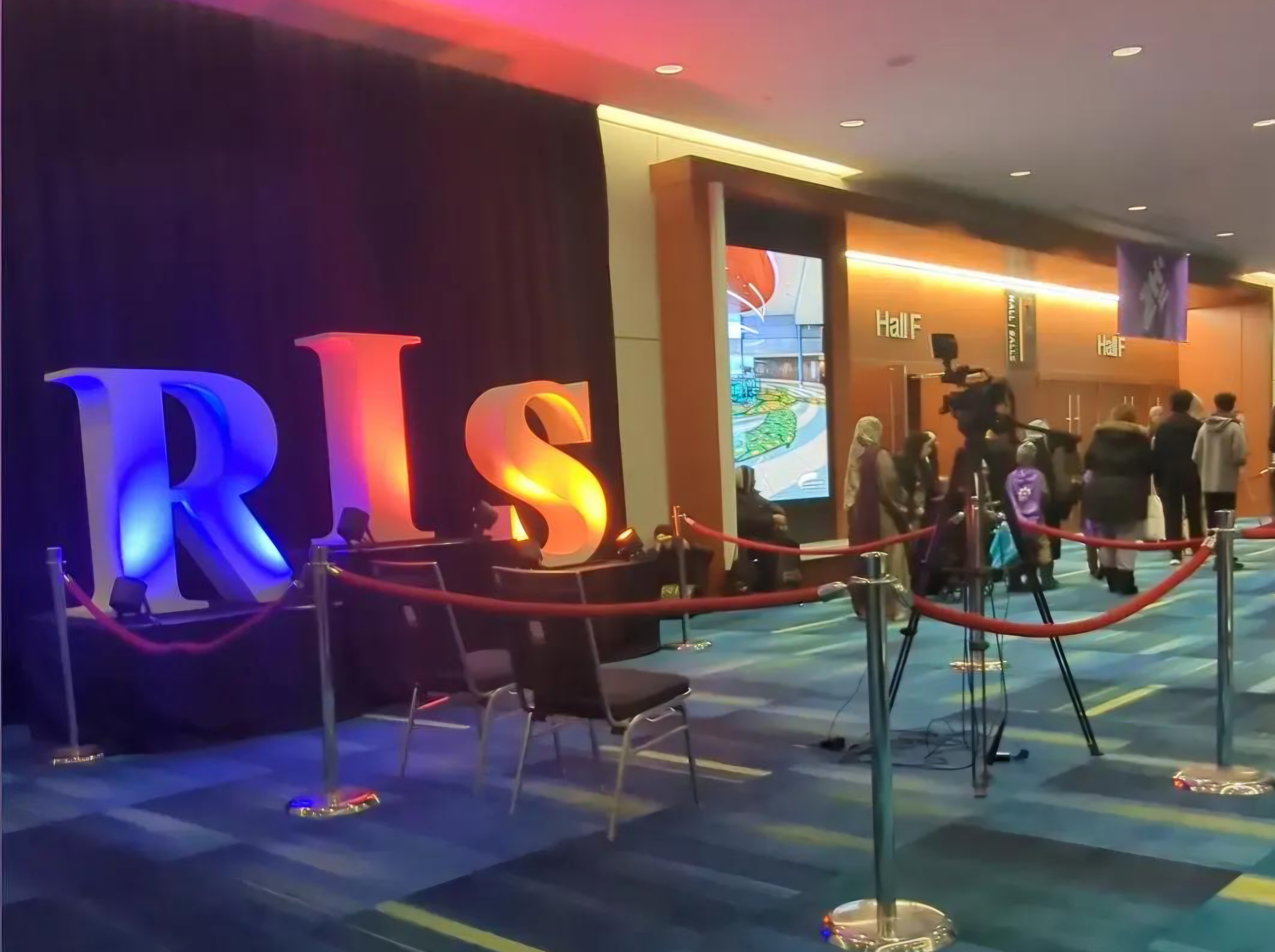
RIS 2024

The first conference was held in 2003, and has since become one of North America's largest Islamic conferences, alongside the ISNA convention in the United States. The conference has grown from 3,500 attendees in its first year to over 20,000 in 2011, making it the largest Islamic conference in Canada. Attendees and speakers attend from around the world, including the United States, Europe and the Middle East. In May 2010, RIS held its first American conference in Long Beach, California. Following the second U.S. edition at the Long Beach Convention Center on Memorial Day weekend the conference was discontinued.

== Overview ==
The format of the conference typically consists of a series of lectures over three days, generally structured around a specific central theme. Each year distinguished speakers, including both Islamic scholars and non-Muslims, are invited to lecture based on the selected theme of the conference. Previous conference themes have included the life of the Islamic prophet Muhammad, Canadian-Muslim identity, and Islamic civilization.

== Concert ==
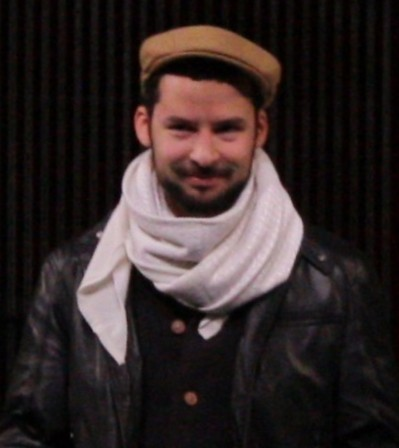
Isam Bachiri at RIS in 2009

A concert has been held at the end of the conference almost every year, usually consisting of nasheed (Islamic music) or performances by Muslim musicians. Main performers who have headlined the concert include: Junaid Jamshed, Sami Yusuf, Maher Zain, Najam Sheraz, Raihan, Native Deen and Danish hip-hop group Outlandish.

== Criticism and accusation of religious fundamentalism ==
The conference has invited some figures like Tariq Ramadan and Bilal Philips. Even Justin Trudeau has participated. Trudeau was criticized later by some media outlets, and other Jewish and Muslim groups, and as well by some members of his own party because they argued that the conference was problematic and had indirect connection with Hamas and that there were aspects of religious radicalism. Among other, there was a sponsor, IRFAN, which was said had sent suspicious funds to Hamas, apparently about 15 million dollars. The sponsor denied the allegations, but decided to withdraw from the conference in order not to cause more controversy. Trudeau himself rejected the criticism.

== Notable speakers ==
Two scholars have made an appearance at the conference every year since it began: Zaid Shakir and Hamza Yusuf except the 2017 conference, which Hamza Yusuf was unable to attend. Other notable speakers who have appeared over the years include:

- Muhammad bin Yahya al-Ninowy
- Mustafa Hosni
- Hamza Yusuf
- Abdullah bin Bayyah
- Habib Ali Al-Jifri
- Zaid Shakir
- Tariq Suwaidan
- Bilal Philips
- Siraj Wahhaj
- Jamal Badawi
- Attallah Shabazz, eldest daughter of Malcolm X
- Justin Trudeau
- Eric Margolis, journalist
- Robert Fisk, journalist
- Karen Armstrong, author
- Imran Khan, Pakistani cricketer and politician
- Michael Lerner, Rabbi
- Zakir Naik
- Suhaib Webb
- Yasir Qadhi
- Mark Siljander, former Republican U.S. Representative
- Chris Hedges, journalist
- Nouman Ali Khan
- Linda Sarsour
- Maulana Tariq Jameel

== List of conferences ==
RIS	Theme	Venue	Date
1	Reviving the Islamic Spirit	Metro Toronto Convention Centre	January 4–5, 2001
2	Changing Our Condition	Metro Toronto Convention Centre	January 2–4, 2004
3	Legacy of the Prophet	Rogers Centre	December 24–26, 2004
4	Islamic Civilization	Direct Energy Centre	December 23–26, 2005
5	The Neglected Sunnah: Patience in the Face of Rejection	Metro Toronto Convention Centre	December 22–24, 2006
6	Family Matters: The Basis of a Civil Society	Metro Toronto Convention Centre	December 28–30, 2007
7	Answering the Call of God's Messenger: Setting Prophetic Priorities for Muslims in the West	Metro Toronto Convention Centre	December 26–28, 2008
8	SOS: Saving the Ship of Humanity	Metro Toronto Convention Centre	December 25–27, 2009
9	Rules for the Road of Life: Reviving the 10 Commandments in the Modern World	Metro Toronto Convention Centre	December 24–26, 2010
10	Control, Chaos or Community: Three Ways, One World, Our Choice	Metro Toronto Convention Centre	December 23–25, 2011
11	Divine Light for Living Right: Prophetic Guidance in the Midst of Modern Darkness	Metro Toronto Convention Centre	December 21–23, 2012
12	Changing Our Condition: Rekindling the Light of Faith	Metro Toronto Convention Centre	December 27–29, 2013
13	He Came To Teach You Your Religion: Prophetic Answers to Angelic Questions	Metro Toronto Convention Centre	December 26–28, 2014
14	Alliance of Virtue	Metro Toronto Convention Centre	December 25–27, 2015
15	The Promise of God: Conditions for Renewal	Metro Toronto Convention Centre	December 23–25, 2016
16	Whither Islam? Rebooting Our Faith	Metro Toronto Convention Centre	December 22–24, 2017
17	RIS Reimagined	Metro Toronto Convention Centre	December 21–23, 2018
18	His Character was the Quran: Restoring the Quranic Narrative in Modern Times	Metro Toronto Convention Centre	December 20–22, 2019
19	An Unconventional Convention	Online	December 26–27, 2020
20	Together in Spirit	Online	December 25–26, 2020
21	A Blessed Reunion	Metro Toronto Convention Centre	December 23–25, 2022
22	Where Hearts Meet	Metro Toronto Convention Centre	December 22–24, 2023
