= Jooks =

Danish rapper (born 1980)

- Also known as: MC Jo, Dr. Jooks MacFive
- Born: Johan Forsby; 5 March 1980 (age 46)
- Origin: Denmark
- Genre: rap
- Occupations: Rapper, songwriter
- Years active: 1997–present
- Website: www.jooks.dk

Johan Forsby better known by his stage name Jooks (born 5 March 1980) is a Danish rapper signed to ArtPeople label.

He began his career performing under the name MC Jo. Johan Forsby gained fame after winning the DM i Rap rapping competition in 1997, in association with the rap band trio Rent mel consisting of him as MC Jo, Tegnedrengen and JernHenrik (later known as Hennesey). Johan Forsby also used at the time the name Dr. Jooks MacFive, shortening it later to Jooks.

Jooks cooperated with a number of renowned Danish rappers like L.O.C., Clemens, Jokeren, Niarn, Per Vers and rap band Suspekt.

In 2008, he had some success with "Jackmove" and "Træk vejret" and in June 2009 released his debut solo album, Privilegeret, which was an immediate success with the single "Hun vil ha' en rapper" topping the Tracklisten, the official Danish Singles Chart.

Jooks is married to Julia Lahme, and they have two children, Elias and Sofus.

== Discography ==
=== Albums ===
Year	Album	Peak positions
Year	Album	DEN
2009	Privilegeret	9
2015	Dyr	11

=== Singles ===
Year	Single	Peak positions	Album
Year	Single	DEN	Album
2009	"Hun vil ha' en rapper"	1	Privilegeret

Featured in

Year	Single	Peak positions	Album
Year	Single	DEN	Album
2009	"Har det hele" (Rune RK feat. Karen & Jooks)	8	
