= Jøden =

Jøden may refer to:

- Jøden, a Jewish ethnonym in Danish language
- Jøden (rapper) (born 1974), a Danish rapper
