= Room with a View =

Room with a View may refer to:

- A Room with a View, a 1908 novel by E. M. Forster

== Film and television ==
- A Room with a View (1985 film), a film adaptation of Forster's novel
- "Rm w/a Vu", a 1999 episode of Angel
- "Rooms with a View", a 2002 episode of Frasier
- A Room with a View (2007 film), a British television adaptation of Forster's novel

== Music ==
=== Albums ===
- Room with a View, a 1980 album by Player
- Room with a View (album), a 2001 album by Carolyn Dawn Johnson and the title song

=== Songs ===
- "A Room with a View", a song from the revue This Year of Grace by Noël Coward
- "Room with a View", a song by Atheist from Piece of Time
- "Room with a View", a song by Brother Ali from Shadows on the Sun
- "A Room with a View", a song by Death Angel from Act III
- "Room with a View", a song by Jeffrey Osborne
- "Room with a View", a song by The Tear Garden from Tired Eyes Slowly Burning
- "Room with a View", a song by Tina Dico from In the Red
- "Room with a View", a song by Tony Carey from Wilder Westen inclusive soundtrack
- "A Room with a V.U.", a song by Voivod from Infini
- "Room with a View", a song by Wall of Voodoo from Seven Days in Sammystown.
