= You Are All I See =

You Are All I See may refer to:

- You Are All I See, a 2011 album by Active Child
  - "You Are All I See", its title track
- "You Are All I See", a 1977 song by Dan Hill from the album Longer Fuse
- You Are All I See, a 2018 dance work by Wen Wei Wang

== See also ==
- All I See Is You (disambiguation)
- You're All I See (disambiguation)
