= Count to Ten =

Count to Ten can refer to:

- Count to Ten (album), an album by Tina Dico
- Count to Ten (film), a 1985 Argentine film directed by Oscar Barney Finn
- "Count to Ten", a song by Dala from the album This Moment Is a Flash
