= Orgie =

Orgie may refer to:

- Orgy, with Orgie being an alternative form. Plural orgies
- Orgi-E (born 1979), Danish rapper and member of Suspekt

== See also ==
- Orgia, religious rites in ancient Greece
- Orgie des Todes
