= All I See (disambiguation) =

"All I See" is a 2008 song by Australian singer Kylie Minogue.

All I See may also refer to:

== Other songs ==
- "All I See" (A+ song), 1996
- "All I See" (Christopher Williams song), 1992
- "All I See", by Couse and The Impossible from The World Should Know, 2005
- "All I See", by Dido from Girl Who Got Away, 2013
- "All I See", by Everyday People from You Wash... I'll Dry, 1990
- "All I See", by Fiend from I Won't Be Denied, 1995
- "All I See", by Frankmusik from Carissimi, 2021
- "All I See", by Hybrid from Reappear Here, 2010
- "All I See", by Kate Voegele from Gravity Happens, 2011
- "All I See", by Linda Thompson from Fashionably Late, 2002
- "All I See", by Lydia from Illuminate, 2008
- "All I See", by Mutemath from Vitals, 2015
- "All I See", by No-Man from Flowermix, 1995
- "All I See", by Presence from Inside, 1992
- "All I See", by Teddy Thompson from Teddy Thompson, 2000
- "All I See", by The Magic Numbers from Those the Brokes, 2006
- "All I See", by Tina Dico from A Beginning, a Detour, an Open Ending and The Road to Gävle, 2008 and 2009
- "All I See", by Bondax, 2014
- "All I See", by Girl and Girl, 2023
- "All I See", by Gary LeVox featuring Breland, 2021
- "All I See (Joy)", by Kayswitch feat Olamide, 2016
- "All I See", by Phyno featuring Duncan Mighty, 2019
- "All I See", by Thundamentals, 2020

== Other uses ==
- All I See, a 1988 novel by Cynthia Rylant

== See also ==
- All I See Is You (disambiguation)
