= Aïcha =

1996 song by Khaled

Single by Khaled

from the album Sahra
- Language: Arabic; French
- Released: 3 August 1996
- Studio: Studio Davout (Paris)
- Genre: Raï
- Length: 4:19
- Label: Barclay
- Songwriters: Jean-Jacques Goldman; Khaled
- Producer: Jean-Jacques Goldman

Khaled singles chronology
"Bakhta" (1995)	"Aïcha" (1996)	"Ouelli El Darek" (1997)

Music video
- "Aïcha" on YouTube

Aïcha "Aïcha" (/aɪˈiːʃə/ eye-EE-shə, French: [a.iʃa]; Arabic: عائشة, romanized: ʿāʾisha, pronounced [ˈʕaːʔiʃa]; Algerian Arabic: عايشة) is a song written by French singer-songwriter Jean-Jacques Goldman, performed by Algerian raï artist Khaled. In 1996, the song was released as a single containing two versions: a French version and a bilingual version sung in both French and Arabic. The Arabic lyrics were written by Khaled. On his 1996 album Sahra, the bilingual version is featured. The song's music video, which also uses the mixed language version, was directed by Sarah Moon.

== Lyrics ==
The song's lyrics are about a woman named Aïcha, who is being wooed by a man. He promises her pearls, jewels, poems, and other luxuries and romantic things, which she declines. The lyrics are all in French, as well as an Arabic verse sung by Khaled.

== Track listings ==
German maxi-CD single

1. "Aïcha" (bilingual version) — 4:20
2. "Aïcha" — 4:20
3. "Sratli" — 4:33

== Charts ==
=== Weekly charts ===
Chart (1996–1997)	Peak position
Belgium (Ultratop 50 Flanders)	25
Belgium (Ultratop 50 Wallonia)	1
France (SNEP)	1
Germany (GfK)	33
Netherlands (Dutch Top 40)	10
Netherlands (Single Top 100)	14
Switzerland (Schweizer Hitparade)	11

=== Year-end charts ===
Chart (1996)	Position
Belgium (Ultratop 50 Wallonia)	7
France (SNEP)	4
Netherlands (Dutch Top 40)	84

Chart (1997)	Position
Germany (Media Control)	59
Romania (Romanian Top 100)	80

== Certifications ==
Region	Certification	Certified units/sales
Belgium (BRMA)	Platinum	50,000^{*}
France (SNEP)	Diamond	750,000^{*}
^{*} Sales figures based on certification alone.

== Outlandish version ==
"Aicha"

Single by Outlandish

from the album Bread & Barrels of Water
- Released: 10 June 2003
- Recorded: 2002
- Studio: Mintman (Copenhagen)
- Genre: R&B
- Length: 4:37
- Label: RCA; BMG Denmark
- Songwriters: Carsten Mortensen; Isam Bachiri; Jean-Jacques Goldman; Roger Lenny Martinez; Waqas Ali Qadri
- Producers: Mintman; Outlandish

Outlandish singles chronology
"Gritty" (2002)	"Aicha" (2003)	"Man binder os på mund og hånd" (2004)

Music video
- "Aicha" on YouTube

In June 2003, Danish hip hop band Outlandish released an English version of the song, "Aicha", that was included on their album Bread & Barrels of Water (2002). Their version was produced and performed by Mintman, along with the band. The song peaked at number one in Germany, the Netherlands, Romania, Sweden, and Switzerland and became a top-10 hit in Austria, Flanders, and Norway. A video was also shot for the single.

=== Track listings ===
CD maxi

1. "Aicha" (4:37)
2. "Aicha" (Mintman Remix) (4:34)
3. "Aicha" (Instrumental) (4:08)
4. Outlandish feat. Majid & Asmaá – "El Moro" (5:24)

=== Charts ===
==== Weekly charts ====
Chart (2003)	Peak position
Austria (Ö3 Austria Top 40)	3
Belgium (Ultratop 50 Flanders)	8
Europe (Eurochart Hot 100)	4
Germany (GfK)	1
Hungary (Editors' Choice Top 40)	35
Italy (FIMI)	42
Netherlands (Dutch Top 40)	1
Netherlands (Single Top 100)	2
Norway (VG-lista)	3
Romania (Romanian Top 100)	1
Sweden (Sverigetopplistan)	1
Switzerland (Schweizer Hitparade)	1

==== Year-end charts ====
Chart (2003)	Position
Austria (Ö3 Austria Top 40)	17
Belgium (Ultratop 50 Flanders)	74
Germany (Media Control GfK)	7
Netherlands (Dutch Top 40)	13
Netherlands (Single Top 100)	21
Romania (Romanian Top 100)	29
Sweden (Topplistan)	6
Switzerland (Schweizer Hitparade)	4

== Other versions ==
The original song has since been remade by several singers and bands:

- The French version was performed by Khaled with fellow Raï singer Faudel at the famous 1998 1,2,3 Soleils concert in Paris
- Between 1996-1997, the Egyptian-born Brazilian singer Gilbert performed the song. The song was part of 1997-1998 Brazilian telenovela Por Amor soundtrack.
- A zouk version was made by Kassav'
- A salsa version was made by Africando
- A cappella versions by Penn Masala, Stanford Raagapella, Alaa Wardi, and Aquabella
- Indian/Dubai based singer, Rayshad Rauf adapted Outlandish's chorus part in one of his Mashups Don't,
- A nasheed (Islamic) version by Omar Esa

It has been adapted to several other languages:

- An Urdu version by Amanat Ali, titled Aaisha, was featured on the Pakistani Music program Coke Studio.
- A French / Arabic version by Lobo Ismail with altered lyrics and added a uniquely composed Arabic language rap sequence Video on YouTube
- An English rock version by Outlandish Video on YouTube
- A Polish version by Magma Video on YouTube
- A Malay version with bits of Arabic by Yasin, titled as Aishah Video on YouTube.
- A Serbian version was made by Dragana Mirković and was titled Hajde pogledaj me (Come on, look at me) Video on YouTube
- A Korean version by Tony An titled Aisha
- A Hebrew version, titled "Aisha" (Hebrew: עיישה), was written by Ehud Manor and performed by Haim Moshe Video on YouTube
- A Turkish version by Mutaf, titled "Ayşa"
- A Turkmen version by Mekan Ataýew, titled "Aişa"
- A Greek version, titled "M'aresei" (Greek: M'αρεσει), was performed by Kostas Bigalis. Video on youtube.
- A second Greek version, titled "Alithia Sou Leo" (Greek: Αλήθεια σου λέω), was performed by Stamatis Gonidis in 2006 Video on YouTube
- A Spanish / Arabic version titled "Aicha" by Amistades Peligrosas Video on YouTube
- A Croatian version was made by Duško Lokin. Song title is Aisha.
- A Norwegian version titled Aisha" was made by Emiré og Lillebror Video on YouTube
- A Breton version, Aisha, was made by Manau.
- A techno, Oriental, acoustic-guitar version (Aicha on YouTube) was performed by guitarist Muayad Jajo in Sulaimaniya in August 2014, published by Elite Studios.
- A German version titled Aicha by Moe Phoenix
- A Mandarin Chinese version titled Aicha by Ayisha Elseenya on youtube

== See also ==
- List of Romanian Top 100 number ones of the 2000s
