= Tina Dico =

Danish singer-songwriter

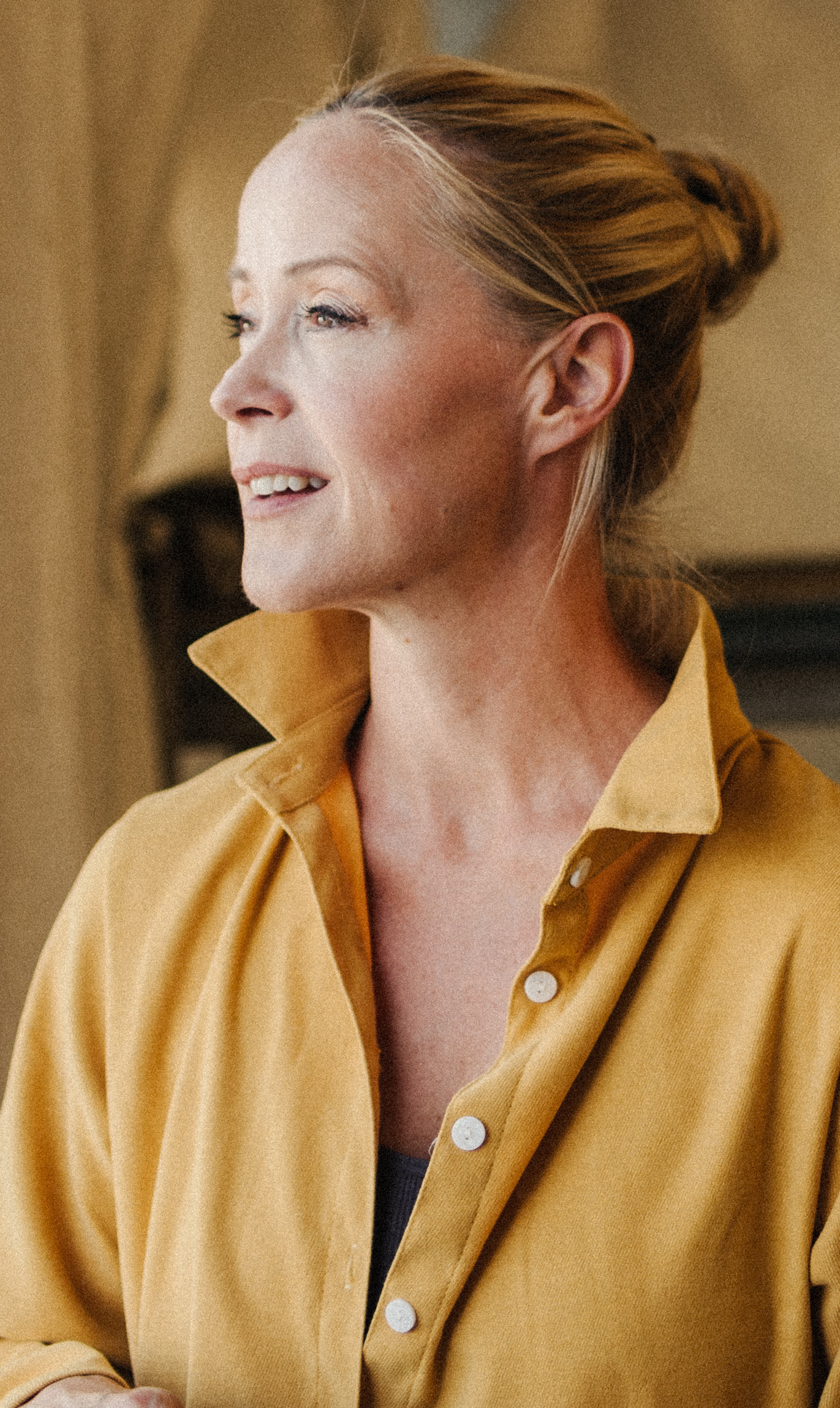
- Dico in Edmonton in 2024

Background information
- Born: Tina Dickow Danielsen; 14 October 1977 (age 49)
- Origin: Aarhus, Denmark
- Genres: Alternative; pop rock; synthpop; indie
- Instruments: Guitar, vocals
- Years active: 1997–present
- Label: Finest Gramophone
- Website: tinadico.com

Tina Dico (born Tina Dickow Danielsen on 14 October 1977) is a Danish singer-songwriter. She founded her own record label and releases her music independently, enjoying large success with her albums in her home country as well as critical acclaim across Europe.

In Denmark she performs both under her real name, Tina Dickow, and under the adopted name Tina Dico as well.

== Music career ==
=== A Handful of Danish EP ===
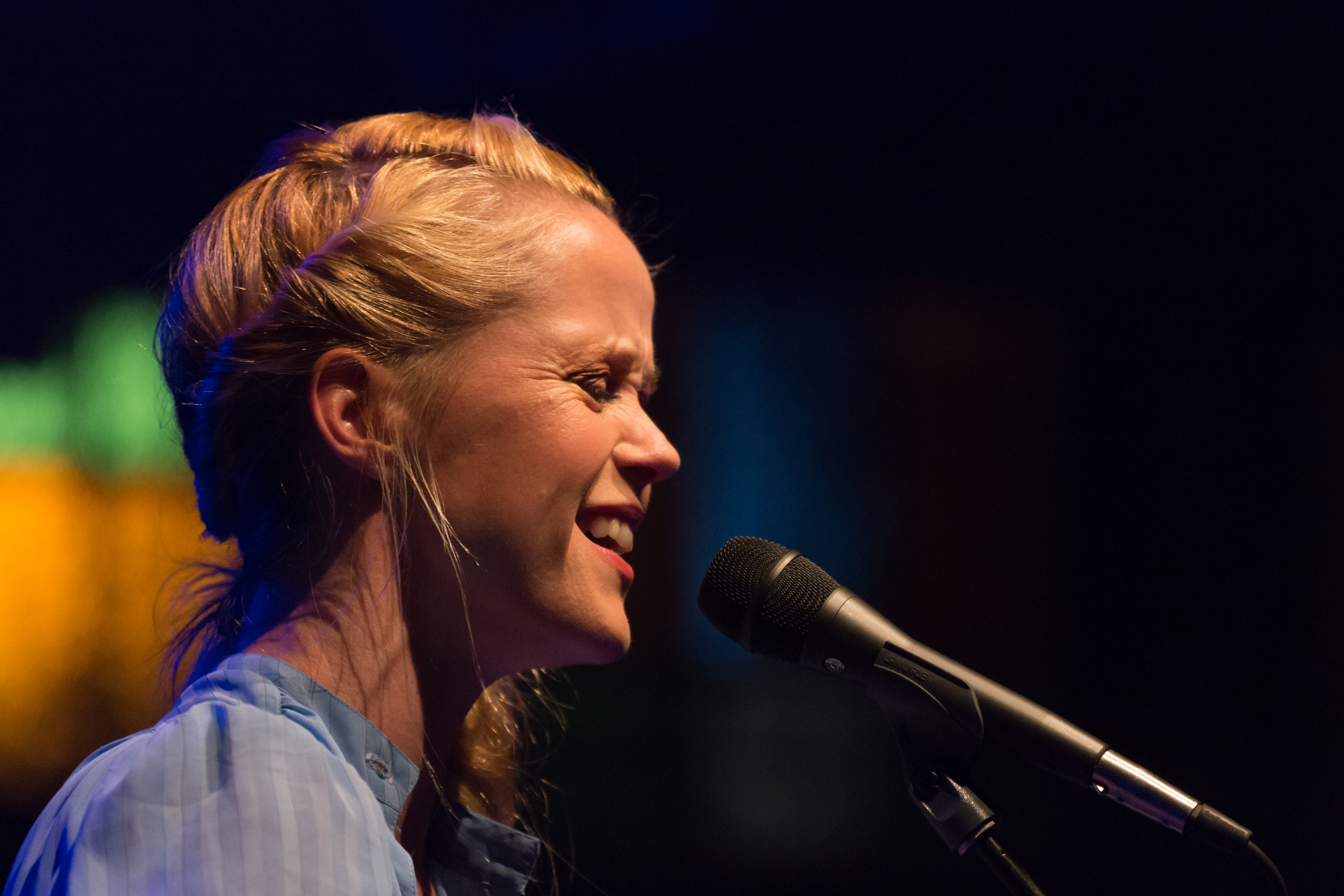
Tina Dico (2015)

In December 2014 Dico released a six-song digital-only EP entitled En Håndfuld Danske (A Handful of Danish), composed of Danish-language cover versions of other artists’ songs. The songs were chosen by fans in a poll announced in early October 2014 and were first made available free on Spotify on 1 December 2014. The EP became available for sale on iTunes on 12 January 2015.

=== Other works ===
Dico provided the voice for Queen Iduna in the Danish version of the Disney film Frozen II, known as Frost II in Denmark, singing the tracks "Alle svar" and "Kom nu frem". ("All Is Found" and "Show Yourself", respectively, in Danish.)

== Awards and achievements ==
In 2008, she received the Danish Crown Prince Couple's Culture Prize.

In 2005, her album, In The Red rose to No. 1 on the Danish album charts.

== Personal life ==
Dico married partner and collaborator Helgi Jónsson on 13 July 2014 near Reykjavík, where they live.

== Discography ==
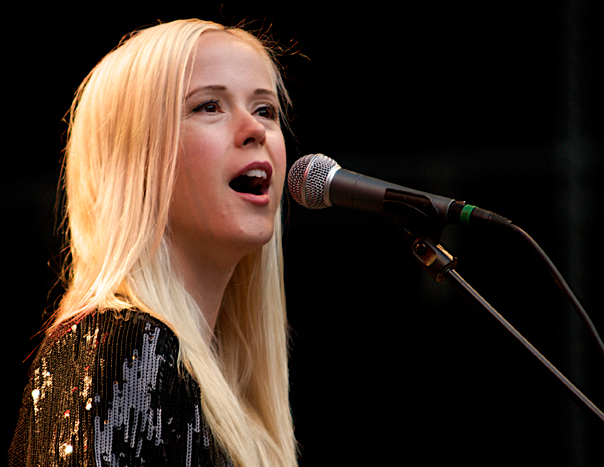
Tina Dickow (2009)

=== Studio albums ===
Year	Album	Peak position DEN	Certification	Credited as
2001	Fuel: Released: 2001; Label: Finest Gramophone; Track listing: No. / Title / Length; 1. / "My Mirror" / 4:59; 2. / "Fuel" / 4:34; 3. / "Forever" / 3:43; 4. / "More" / 4:33; 5. / "If I'd Sinned" / 4:36; 6. / "Watch Your Tongue" / 4:37; 7. / "Her Secret" / 5:18; 8. / "Your Waste of Time" / 5:51; 9. / "Different" / 5:28; 10. / "Back Where We Started" / 4:57; 11. / "Send My Best" / 4:23	–		Tina Dickow
2003	Notes: Released: 2003; Label: Finest Gramophone; Track listing: No. / Title / Length; 1. / "Notes" / 0:52; 2. / "Break of Day" / 3:50; 3. / "Warm Sand" / 3:15; 4. / "Boys and Girls" / 2:01; 5. / "Poetess Play" / 4:06; 6. / "Do Something" / 3:28; 7. / "Let's Get Lost" / 5:00; 8. / "Room with a View" / 3:06; 9. / "Too Much" / 4:12; 10. / "Undone" / 3:45; 11. / "Tenterground No.5" / 5:25; 12. / "So Long Hearts" / 2:56	40		Tina Dickow
2006	In The Red: Released: 2006; Label: Finest Gramophone	1		Tina Dico
2007	Count to Ten: Released: 2007; Label: Finest Gramophone	1		Tina Dickow
2008	A Beginning, A Detour, An Open Ending: Released: 2008; Label: Finest Gramophone	2		Tina Dico
2009	The Road to Gävle: Released: 2009; Label: Finest Gramophone; Track listing: No. / Title / Length; 1. / "Long Way Home/Rain on the Court" / 3:20; 2. / "Goldhawk Road" / 3:11; 3. / "In Love and War" / 2:44; 4. / "Rebel Song" / 3:08; 5. / "Swedish Skies" / 3:48; 6. / "There It Is!/Prison Exit (Ode to My Heart)" / 2:20; 7. / "Private Party" / 2:43; 8. / "Love All Around" / 3:19; 9. / "All I See" / 3:57; 10. / "Two Funerals" / 5:20; 11. / "Boot Meets Scull/Silence in the Car" / 2:26; 12. / "Hitchhiker's Theme" / 2:58; 13. / "River of What's Been" / 4:34	5		Tina Dickow
2010	Welcome Back Colour: Released: 2010; Label: Finest Gramophone; Track listing: No. / Title / Length; 1. / "Welcome Back Colour" / 3:33; 2. / "Paper Thin" / 4:16; 3. / "Nobody's Man" / 3:48; 4. / "Warm Sand" / 3:56; 5. / "One" / 3:51; 6. / "On the Run" / 3:56; 7. / "Sacre Coeur" / 5:06; 8. / "Open Wide" / 4:48; 9. / "Count to Ten" / 4:31; 10. / "Stains" / 3:33; 11. / "A New Situation" / 4:10; 12. / "Goldhawk Road" / 3:15; 13. / "Love All Around" / 3:40; 14. / "Instead" / 3:28; Special edition CD 2: No. / Title / Length; 1. / "Copenhagen" / 3:37; 2. / "Watching Him Go" / 3:47; 3. / "Glow" / 3:34; 4. / "Rebel Song" / 3:04; 5. / "Room with a View" / 3:45; 6. / "Let's Go Dancing" (featuring Teitur) / 3:39; 7. / "Home" / 3:19; 8. / "The City/London" / 4:44; 9. / "Strong Man" / 3:41; 10. / "Back Where We Started" / 3:40; 11. / "Break of Day" / 4:09; 12. / "Waltz" (featuring Helgi Jonsson) / 4:08	1		Tina Dickow
2012	Where Do You Go to Disappear?: Released: 7 September 2012; Label: Finest Gramophone; Track listing: No. / Title / Length; 0. / Untitled / 3:43; 1. / "We're All Experts" / 3:59; 2. / "Moon to Let" / 4:45; 3. / "The World Is Perfect" / 3:37; 4. / "Point of No Return" / 4:29; 5. / "The Time of Our Lives" / 4:51; 6. / "True North" / 4:45; 7. / "The Tip of the Iceberg" / 4:17; 8. / "You Wanna Teach Me to Dance" / 5:16; 9. / "Sunrise"; 10. / "The Other Side" / 3:23; 11. / "Where Do You Go to Disappear?" / 4:09; 12. / "You Leave You Learn" / 4:16; 13. / "Kids Go Where the Light Is" / 4:49	1		Tina Dickow
2014	Whispers: Released: 25 August 2014; Label: Finest Gramophone; No. / Title / Length; 1. / "The Woman Downstairs" / 4:23; 2. / "As Far as Love Goes" / 3:49; 3. / "Someone You Love" / 3:41; 4. / "Drifting" / 3:54; 5. / "Mines" / 4:26; 6. / "Whispers" / 3:59; 7. / "You Don't Step into Love" / 4:12; 8. / "Old Friends" / 4:03; 9. / "I Want You" / 4:08; 10. / "Thank You" / 2:46; 11. / "Spark" / 3:49; 12. / "Ask Again" / 4:18	–		Tina Dico
2015	En håndfuld danske: Released: Label: A:larm / Universal Music	12		Tina Dickow
2018	Fastland: Released: 28 September 2018; Label: A:larm / Universal Music; Track listing: No. / Title / Length; 1. / "Not Even Close" / 3:43; 2. / "Devil's Door" / 3:23; 3. / "Parked Car" / 4:12; 4. / "Fancy" / 3:40; 5. / "Hands" / 4:30; 6. / "Night Out" / 4:04; 7. / "Adams House" / 3:40; 8. / "People Are Strange" / 4:16; 9. / "Change Yourself" / 1:06; 10. / "Something You Can Keep" / 3:08	1		Tina Dico
2022	Bitte små ryk: Released: 3 April 2022; Label: Finest Gramophone; Track listing: No. / Title / Length; 1 / "Brev hjem" / 3:57; 2 / "Bitte små ryk" / 4:35; 3 / "Menneskedyr" (featuring Kjartan Arngrim) / 4:08; 4 / "Hjertestorm" / 4:29; 5 / "Højdesyge" / 4:36; 6 / "Lidt mere menneske" / 4:42; 7 / "Jeg har så travlt" / 4:29; 8 / "Chefen skal ha' fri" / 3:56; 9 / "Lige nu" / 3:30; 10 / "Lykken er..." / 4:46; 11 / "Cirkeldans" / 5:01	1		Tina Dickow
2026	Balancing Small Things on Sharp Edges: Released: 23 October 2026; Label: Finest Gramophone	1		Tina Dickow

=== EPs ===
Year	EP
2004	Far: Released: 2004; Label: Defend Music; Track listing: No. / Title / Length; 1. / "Warm Sand" / 3:39; 2. / "Break of Day" / 3:50; 3. / "Boys and Girls" / 2:12; 4. / "Haunted" / 3:32; 5. / "Let's Get Lost" / 5:01; 6. / "Back Where We Started" / 4:50
2007	A Beginning: Released: 2007; Label: Finest Gramophone
2008	A Detour: Released: 2008; Label: Finest Gramophone
2008	An Open Ending: Released: 2008; Label: Finest Gramophone

=== Live albums ===
Year	Album	Peak position DEN
2011	Live with the Danish National Chamber Orchestra: Released: 2011; Label: Finest Gramophone	12

=== Singles ===
Year	Song	Peak position	Album	Credited as
Year	Song	DEN	Album	Credited as
2009	"Open Wide"	1	Welcome Back Colour	Tina Dickow
2010	"Welcome Back Colour"	19	Welcome Back Colour	Tina Dickow
2010	"Copenhagen"	14	Welcome Back Colour	Tina Dickow
2012	"Moon to Let"	22	Where Do You Go to Disappear?	Tina Dico
2012	"You Wanna Teach Me to Dance"	24	Where Do You Go to Disappear?	Tina Dickow
2014	"Someone You Love"	13	Whispers	Tina Dickow
2014	"Old Friends"	26	Whispers	Tina Dickow
2014	"Mines"	11	Whispers	Tina Dickow

Featured on

Year	Song	Peak position	Album
Year	Song	DEN	Album
2011	"Helt alene" (Suspekt featuring Tina Dickow)	1	Elektra

=== Other appearances ===
- The 2004 album When It Falls by Zero7 features Tina Dico on vocals on the songs "Home" and "The Space Between".
- The 2006 album Precious Time by Canadian dance-rock band Euphoria features Tina Dico on vocals in the songs "Blue" and "Sinners and Saints".
- Instant Karma: The Amnesty International Campaign to Save Darfur (2007) Tina Dico (listed as Tina Dickow) cover of "Working Class Hero" (John Lennon)
- Side by Side – Duets Vol. 1 Award-winning American artist AM and Tina Dico perform the duet "While My Guitar Gently Weeps" (2008), a cover of a George Harrison song.
- On the soundtrack of the 2010 film Clash of the Titans, Dico performed and co-wrote the song "The Storm That Brought Me to You".
- Dico is listed as both "songwriter" and "featuring" on Helgi Jónsson's 2010 album Big Spring.
- Dico is featured on the hip-hop group Suspekt's album Elektra, which was released in September 2011.

== Sources ==
- ROSA-article about the release of Fuel
- ROSA-article about moving to England
- ROSA-article about the release of Notes
- Interview with Tina Dico about The Road to Gävle
- Biography from Tina Dico's own page
- GAFFA-price 2007
