= Johnson (rapper) =

Danish rapper (born 1979)

- Also known as: NiggerenISlæden, N.I.S.
- Born: Marc Kwabena Johnson; 1979 (age 46–47); Svendborg
- Origin: Svendborg, Denmark
- Genre: Rap
- Occupation: Rap
- Years active: 1998–present

Marc Kwabena Johnson (born 1979), better known as Johnson, is a Danish rapper. Previously he was known as NiggerenISlæden (alias N.I.S.). Before his solo career, he was a member of the band B.A.N.G.E.R.S. and J.A.Z. and has collaborated with many Danish hip hop artists.

== Career ==
Johnson was born in Svendborg to a Ghanaian father and a Danish mother. After his father's death, he moved to live with his mother and half sister, singer Zindy Laursen to Åbyhøj, Aarhus, where he grew up.

In 1998, he was a founding member of the rap group B.A.N.G.E.R.S. alongside other founding members U$O, L.O.C. and DJ Rescue. Together they released an EP entitled V.I.P. EP, and appeared in a small indie release with four tracks.

His big breakthrough came in 2004 with the release of his joint self-titled EP Johnson & Malone with childhood friend Ralle Malone on the Run for Cover label with producer Pilfinger from Glamour Hotel Music

In 2005, he built up on his success as a part of the group J.A.Z., that consisted of Marc Johnson, his sister Zindy Laursen and of Alex Ambrose. JAZ released the single "Ingen gør som vi gør" (meaning in Danish language Nobody does what we do).

Johnson's first solo album was released on 29 May 2006 entitled Det passer produced by Pilfinger. On this album Johnson collaborated with L.O.C., U$O and HAZ bandmate Alex Ambrose. In spring of 2007, he appeared alongside L.O.C. and U$O on the single "Ingen Diskussion".

On 21 September 2009, Johnson released his second solo album Alt mit shit (meaning All my shit in Danish). Singles from the album included "Bawler Hele Dagen" and "Teriyaki".

His forthcoming album will be produced by Pilfinger (from Glamour Hotel Music).

Johnson notably contributed to the collaborative single "Hey Shorty" that appeared in Thomas Kato's album Discolized. The single released in February 2010 was a big success reaching #2 on Tracklisten, the official Danish Singles Chart. Another collaboration was the 4 June 2010 released mixtape Got the anlæg going åndssvag with U$O downloadable freely at the website Gratismixtape.dk . Johnson also had a collaborative #1 hit on Tracklisten with "Sjus" that was done by Kato featuring Ida Corr, Camille Jones and Johnson himself.

In 2010 Johnson was also involved in the Danish television program AllStars where he represents his home town of Aarhus.

== Discography ==
=== Albums and EPs ===
As part of B.A.N.G.E.R.S.

- 2004L V.I.P. (EP)

Solo albums

- 2006: Det passer (on ArtPeople)
- 2009: Alt mit shit (on ArtPeople)

Duo albums

- 2004: Johnson & Malone (credited to Johnson & Malone on Run For Cover label)
- 2010: Got the anlæg going åndssvag (credited to Johnson and U$O on Selvfinancieret)

Appearing with other artist releases

- 1999: VIP EP (with B.A.N.G.E.R.S. on Rescue Records)
- 1999: Funkalation (with various artists on $kandalø$)
- 2000: Mr.Mista (with U$O on $kandalø$)
- 2001: Smoke & Mirrors (with various artists on Rescue Records)
- 2002: Uden Om Systemet (with Pimp-A-Lot)
- 2003: Dansk Rap 1988-2003 (with various artists on Playground Music)
- 2005: Jegvilgerneduvilgerneviskalgerne (with U$O on Virgin)
- 2005: Cassiopeia (with U$O on Virgin)
  - 2006: Cassiopeia Limited Edition (with U$O on Virgin)
- 2007: Hold Nu (with U$O on Sonet Records)

=== Singles ===
Charting singles

- 2009: "Bawler hele dagen" (Johnson) DK#34
- 2010: "Hey Shorty (Yeah Yeah Pt. II)" (Kato feat U$O and Johnson) DK#2
- 2010-11: "Sjus" (Kato feat. Ida Corr, Camille Jones and Johnson) DK#1

=== Song Collaborations ===
- 1999: "Skal Jeg Betale (So!)" / "Verdens Højeste Mand" (on Funkalation album by various artists)
- 2001: "Undskyld So - Snakker Du Til Os" (on U$O's album Mr. Mi$ta)
- 2004: "Der Ska' Mere Til" (Album Gadeplan with various artists)
- 2005: "Rowdy" (on Sheriff's album Benzin På Bålet)
- 2005: "Kan Du Ikk´ Li´ Mig" (on U$O's album JegvilgerneDuvilgerneViskalgerne)
- 2005: "Læg Den Hater Ned" (on L.O.C.'s album Cassiopeia)
  - 2006: "Læg Den Hater Ned" (on L.O.C.'s album Cassiopeia Limited Edition)
- 2006: "Jeg Ser Dig" (with Alex on album Ta' Det Tilbage)
- 2007: "Ingen Diskussion" / "Ingen Diskussion (Remix)" (U$O feat Johnson)
- 2009: "Hva Deer" (U$O feat Johnson)
- 2010: "Vinderholdet" (Joey Moe feat Johnson)
- 2010-11: "Sjus" (Kato feat. Ida Corr, Camille Jones & Johnson) DK#1
