= Closer Than Veins =

Studio album by Outlandish
- Released: 31 October 2005
- Genre: Hip hop
- Label: RCA, Sony BMG
- Producer: Jay-B Bisgaard, Saqib, Outlandish, Maximum Risk, Lucas Secon, Providers, Mintman, Ahsan

Outlandish chronology
Beats, Rhymes & Life (2004)	Closer Than Veins (2005)	Sound of a Rebel (2009)

Closer Than Veins is the third studio album by the Danish hip hop group Outlandish, released on 31 October 2005 by RCA Records.

== Track listing ==
No.	Title	Writer(s)	Producer(s)	Length
1.	"Introspective"	Waqas Qadri, Isam Bachiri, Lenny Martinez, Rahul Dev Burman, Jeppe Bisgaard, Saqib	Jay-B Bisgaard, Saqib, Outlandish	2:27
2.	"Any Given Time"	W. Qadri, Bachiri, Martinez, Frederik Nordsø, Louis Winding, Vicente Amigo	Maximum Risk	4:37
3.	"Look into My Eyes"	Gihad Ali, W. Qadri, Bachiri, Martinez, Omar Shah	Outlandish	4:03
4.	"Just Me"	Shah, W. Qadri, Bachiri, Martinez, Lucas Secon	Lucas Secon	3:53
5.	"Kom igen" (featuring U$O, ADL and Salah Edin)	W. Qadri, Bachiri, Martinez, Bisgaard, Saqib, Ausamah Saed, Adam Baptiste, Abid Tounssi, Otto Francker, Sejr-Volmer Sørensen	Jay-B Bisgaard, Saqib	4:25
6.	"Nothing Left to Do" / "The Vessel Interlude"	Shah, W. Qadri, Bachiri, Martinez, Jeppe Federspiel, Rasmus Stabell / Shaykh Abdallah Adhami, W. Qadri, Bachiri, Martinez	Providers / Outlandish	3:45
7.	"Beyond Words" (featuring Burhan G)	W. Qadri, Bachiri, Martinez, Bisgaard, Saqib, Burhan Genc, Christoph Borkowsky Akbar	Jay-B Bisgaard, Saqib	4:49
8.	"Words Stuck to Heart"	W. Qadri, Bachiri, Martinez, Secon, Donald McLean	Lucas Secon	3:37
9.	"Reggada" (featuring Taibi and Dany Raï)	Taib Ouaich, Mohamed Bellajrou, W. Qadri, Bachiri, Martinez, Nordsø, Winding	Maximum Risk	4:00
10.	"Callin' U"	W. Qadri, Bachiri, Martinez, Carsten Mortensen	Mintman	4:27
11.	"Sakeena"	W. Qadri, Bachiri, Martinez, Ahsan Qadri	Ahsan, Outlandish	5:11
12.	"I've Seen" (featuring Sami Yusuf)	W. Qadri, Bachiri, Martinez, A. Qadri, Sami Yusuf	Ahsan, Outlandish	4:32
13.	"Una Palabra" (featuring Majid)	Shah, W. Qadri, Bachiri, Martinez, Secon, Carlos Varela	Lucas Secon	3:28
14.	"I Only Ask of God"	W. Qadri, Bachiri, Martinez, Nordsø, Winding, León Gieco	Maximum Risk	3:42
15.	"Appreciatin'"	W. Qadri, Bachiri, Martinez, Bisgaard, Saqib	Jay-B Bisgaard, Saqib	4:20

UK edition bonus track
No.	Title	Length
16.	"Redemption Song"	3:46

Deluxe Edition bonus tracks
No.	Title	Writer(s)	Length
16.	"In Good Hands"	W. Qadri, Bachiri, Martinez	3:36
17.	"Angels Lower Their Wings"	W. Qadri, Bachiri, Martinez, Secon	4:21

Notes

- "Introspective" incorporates a sample from the title music from the movie Shalimar composed by Rahul Dev Burman.
- "Kom igen" incorporates replayed and re-sung elements of "Dansevise" composed by Otto Francker & Sejr-Volmer Sørensen, and sung by Grethe and Jørgen Ingmann.
- "The Vessel Interlude" incorporates a sample from the voice recording "The Vessel" of Shaykh Abdallah Adhami.
- "Beyond Words" incorporates a sample from "Ederlezi" composed by Christoph Bowkowsky.

== Charts and certifications ==
=== Charts ===
Chart (2005)	Peak position
Danish Albums Chart	3

=== Certifications ===
Region	Certification	Certified units/sales
Denmark (IFPI Danmark)	Platinum	40,000^{^}
^{^} Shipments figures based on certification alone.
