= Karen (singer) =

Danish singer

- Birth name: Karen Rosenberg
- Born: 20 June 1975 (age 49)
- Origin: Denmark
- Occupation: Singer
- Years active: 2000–present

Karen Rosenberg (born 20 June 1975), better known by her mononym Karen is a Danish R&B singer. She released three albums. Her debut album En til en in 2000 was produced by Saqib of Outlandish and Lasse Lindholm of Hvid Sjokolade. The album was nominated for three awards during the Danish Music Awards, eventually winning Best R&B. She also became famous with "Vis mig du' min mand" taken from the album. Her follow-up album Ingen smalle steder in 2004 was produced by her boyfriend producer Vagn Luv. In 2009, she released Stiletto, but with much lesser success. The album didn't chart on the Tracklisten.

In addition to music, she has become a radio and television celebrity. In 2002, she gained a role in sitcom Langt fra Las Vegas. She presents P3 radio station's Karen & Szhirley with co host Szhirley Haim. The program broadcasts's the best R&B releases in Denmark. She was also one of five official judges during the Dansk Melodi Grand Prix in 2011.

== Discography ==
=== Albums ===
Year	Album	Peak positions
Year	Album	DEN
2000	En til en	39
2004	Ingen smalle steder	23
2009	Stiletto	–

=== Singles ===
Year	Single	Peak positions	Album
Year	Single	DEN	Album
2009	"Sækken i katten"	19	Stiletto
2013	"Problemet"	28	TBA

Featured in

Year	Single	Peak positions	Album
Year	Single	DEN	Album
2010	"Har det hele" (Rune RK feat. Karen & Jooks)	8	
2010	"I nat" (Svenstrup & Vendelboe feat. Karen)	12	
