= Jøden (rapper) =

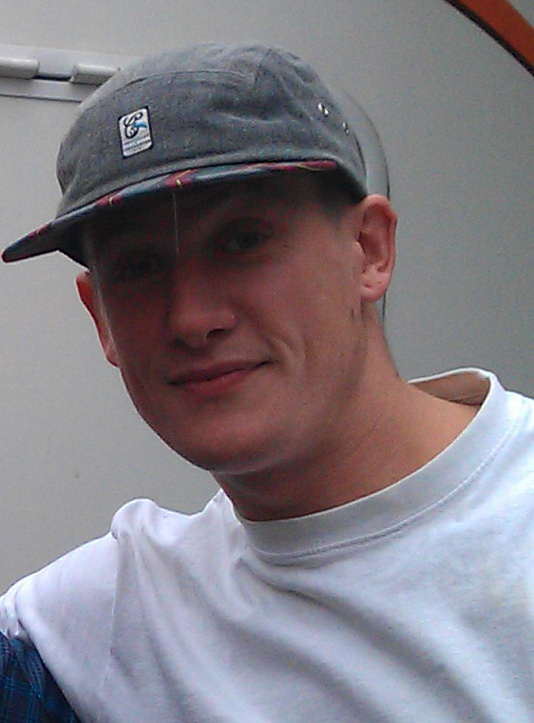
- Jøden in 2011.

Background information
- Born: Michael Mühlebach Christiansen; 7 August 1974 (age 52)
- Origin: Skanderborg, Denmark
- Genre: Hip hop
- Occupation: Rapper
- Years active: 2007–present
- Label: ArtPeople
- Formerly of: Pimp-A-Lot

Michael Mühlebach Christiansen (born 7 August 1974), better known by his stage name Jøden, is a Danish rapper signed to the ArtPeople label.

Mühlebach Christiansen was born in Skanderborg but grew up in Aarhus. He was born in a Catholic family, but was dubbed Jøden (lit. 'The Jew'). He released his debut album Monkeyjuice, produced by DJ Static, which charted in Denmark, reaching number 12. His debut single was "Hamrer Løs" with guest vocalist Peter Sommer.

Additionally, Jøden was a part of Pimp-A-Lot which included Danish-Palestinian rapper Marwan. He also hosted a number of MC's Fight Night rap events in 2006, 2007 and 2008.

In 2011, he started cooperating with Jonny Hefty (real name Jakob Øroms) and released a joint single in May 2011 "Gamle dreng" as well as some other tracks, eventually releasing a joint album in 2013, titled Den fede, which has also charted in Denmark.

== In popular culture ==
- In 2010, he appeared in TV 2 Zulu's Zulu Kvæg-ræs.
- The same year he hosted the live show UPS! Det er live.
- In 2012, he appeared in TV 2 Zulu show Tåber på eventyr and co-hosted with Karsten Green another season of UPS! Det er live.

== Discography ==
=== Albums ===
Solo

Year	Album	Peak positions	Certification
Year	Album	DEN a	Certification
2007	Monkeyjuice	12	

as Jonny Hefty & Jøden

Year	Album	Peak positions	Certification
Year	Album	DEN	Certification
2013	Den fede	6	

=== Singles ===
Year	Single	Peak positions	Album
Year	Single	DEN	Album
2007	"Hamrer Løs" (with Peter Sommer)	–	
