= Sound of a Rebel =

Studio album by Outlandish
- Released: 11 May 2009
- Genre: Hip hop, pop
- Label: RCA, Sony Music
- Producer: Bichi, René Cambony (exec.), Stefan Hoffenberg, Mintman, Outlandish (also exec.), Frederik Tao, Troo.L.S, Louis Winding

Outlandish chronology
Closer Than Veins (2005)	Sound of a Rebel (2009)	Warrior // Worrier (2012)

Singles from Sound of a Rebel
- 1. "Rock All Day" Released: 20 March 2009; 2. "Feels Like Saving the World" Released: 13 July 2009; 3. "Keep the Record on Play" Released: 2010; 4. "Let Off Some Steam" Released: 25 June 2010

Professional ratings
Review scores
Source	Rating
BBC	(favourable)

Sound of a Rebel is the fourth studio album by the Danish hip hop group Outlandish. It was released in Denmark on 11 May 2009. It is Outlandish's comeback album after four years of the band members working on solo projects.

== Music videos ==
- "Rock All Day"Video (Sound Of A Rebel - 2009)
- "Feels Like Saving The World"Video (Sound Of A Rebel - 2009)
- "Keep The Record On Play"Video (Sound Of A Rebel - 2010)
- "Let Off Some Steam"Video (Sound Of A Rebel - 2010)

== Track listing ==
No.	Title	Writer(s)	Producer(s)	Length
1.	"Rock All Day"	Outlandish, Frederik Tao Nordsø Schjoldan, Traditional	Frederik Tao, Outlandish	3:59
2.	"Feels Like Saving the World"	Outlandish, Schjoldan	Frederik Tao	4:18
3.	"Levanta" (featuring Mala Rodríguez and Yadam)	Outlandish, Mala Rodríguez, Yadam Gonzáles, Schjoldan	Frederik Tao	4:33
4.	"Keep the Record on Play" (featuring Ihab Tawfik)	Outlandish, Edwin Serrano, Schjoldan, Sadeeq Hamdi, Mohammed Bahaeldin	Frederik Tao, Outlandish	3:28
5.	"Always Remember"	Outlandish, Serrano, Schjoldan	Frederik Tao, Outlandish (co.)	3:54
6.	"The Emperor's New Beat"	Outlandish, Tobias "Bichi" Wilner, Traditional	Bichi, Outlandish (co.)	3:47
7.	"Let Off Some Steam"	Outlandish, Carsten Mortensen	Frederik Tao, Mintman (original production)	3:40
8.	"Amen"	Outlandish, Stefan Hoffenberg, Louis Winding	Louis Winding, Stefan Hoffenberg	4:22
9.	"Someday"	Outlandish, Bobby Nio, Schjoldan	Frederik Tao, Outlandish	3:44
10.	"Dale Duro" (featuring Lucy Love)	Outlandish, Schjoldan, Lucy Love	Frederik Tao, Outlandish (co.)	3:57
11.	"Crash n' Burn"	Outlandish, Troo.L.S	Troo.L.S	5:17
12.	"Sound of a Rebel"	Neil Young; arranged and additional lyrics by Outlandish	Bichi, Outlandish (co.)	4:11

iTunes Store additional tracks
No.	Title	Length
13.	"Out of Sight" (bonus track)	4:10
14.	"The Whole World" (pre-order bonus track)	7:11
15.	"Revolution 1"	4:28

== Charts and certifications ==
=== Charts ===
Chart (2009)	Peak position
Danish Albums Chart	5

=== Certifications ===
Region	Certification	Certified units/sales
Denmark (IFPI Danmark)	Gold	15,000^{^}
GCC (IFPI Middle East)	Gold	3,000^{*}
^{*} Sales figures based on certification alone.^{^} Shipments figures based on certification alone.
