= You're All I See =

You're All I See may refer to:

- "You're All I See", a 1953 song by Betty Clooney
- "You're All I See", a 1958 song by The Four Freshmen from the album Voices in Love
- "You're All I See", a 2010 song by The Word Alive from the album Deceiver

== See also ==
- All I See Is You (disambiguation)
- You Are All I See (disambiguation)
