= A Beginning, a Detour, an Open Ending =

Studio album by Tina Dico
- Released: 2008
- Genre: Pop rock
- Length: 74:34
- Label: Finest Gramophone

Tina Dico chronology
Count To Ten (2007)	A Beginning, a Detour, an Open Ending (2008)	The Road to Gävle (2009)

A Beginning, a Detour, an Open Ending is a 2008 album by Tina Dico. It is Dico's fifth studio album comprising a boxset of three EPs (shorter albums with 6–7 songs on each) recorded in March 2007, January 2008 and June 2008.

== Track listing ==
Source: Amazon

A Beginning
No.	Title	Length
1.	"He Doesn't Know"	4:07
2.	"Get To Know You"	4:28
3.	"In Love"	2:03
4.	"All I See"	4:09
5.	"Some Other Day"	3:42
6.	"Quarter To Forever"	4:53

A Detour
No.	Title	Length
1.	"No Time To Sleep"	3:51
2.	"Fallen Madonna"	4:04
3.	"Glow"	3:27
4.	"London"	3:53
5.	"Heaven and Hell"	3:38
6.	"Friend In a Bar"	2:58
7.	"The Road"	4:07

An Open Ending
No.	Title	Length
1.	"A New Situation"	4:04
2.	"Stains"	3:27
3.	"In Circles"	1:09
4.	"Walls" (feat. Helgi Jonsson)	3:56
5.	"Magic"	3:52
6.	"Security Check"	3:49
7.	"An Open Ending"	4:58
