= USO (rapper) =

Danish rapper (born 1981)

U$O
- Also known as: USO, Uso, U-Dollartegn (U-Dollar Signs)
- Born: Ausamah Saed; 1981 (age 44–45); Aarhus, Denmark
- Genre: Hip hop
- Years active: 2000–present

Ausamah Saed (born 1981), better known as U$O (alternatively USO, Uso) also known as U-Dollartegn (meaning U-Dollar Signs), is a rapper from Aarhus, Denmark, who released his debut album, Mr. Mista in 2000.

== Associations ==
U$O he was a member of the now defunct rap group B.A.N.G.E.R.S. together with L.O.C. (real name Liam O'Conner) and N.I.S. (Niggeren i Slæden), and later Johnson. They released the EP VIP

U$O is also a member of the group F.I.P. (Full Impact Productions) together with L.O.C. and Suspekt.

== Collaborations ==
He appeared on "Hey Shorty" (full title "Hey Shorty (Yeah Yeah Pt. 2)" by Kato's featuring U$O and Johnson. It reached #2 in the Danish Singles Chart.

He also appeared in the Tech N9ne 2011 single "Worldwide Choppers", also featuring Busta Rhymes, Ceza, D-Loc, JL of B. Hood, Twista, Twisted Insane and Yelawolf, from the album All 6's and 7's. It debuted on the U.S. Billboard Bubbling Under Hot 100 Singles chart at #4 and on the U.S. Billboard Heatseekers Songs chart at #15, becoming U$O's, D-Loc's, Ceza's, JL's, Twisted Insane's, and Yelawolf's most successful song in the U.S.

== Discography ==
=== Albums ===
Title and details	Notes
Mr. Mista: Released: 2000	Track list: 1. Preview; 2. Mr. Mi$ta (feat. Niarn); 3. Hvem Er Den Spiller?; 4. I går Var Det En Vild Nat (feat. Burhan G); 5. Homies & Kællinger; 6. Er Du En Stjerne? (feat. Shady Pimpz); 7. Kaster Dubs; 8. Undskyld So – Snakker Du Til Os? (feat. N.I.S.); 9. PlayerSvarer; 10. Den Forbudte Dans; 11. Lad Være Med At Dømme Mig; 12. Whoop Whoop!; 13. Vi Ved Hvordan Man Gør Det (feat. L.O.C.); 14. Outro
JegvilgerneDuvilgerneViskalgerne: Released: 2005	Track list: 1. Støver Mig Selv Af; 2. Kom så 3. Ikk´ å 4. Krom Skinner; 5. Kaster Dubs 2; 6. Hvorfor Ik' (feat Jokeren & Orgi-E); 7. Freaky og Farlig; 8. International Playa (feat. Tech N9ne); 9. Flyver Derned; 10. Er Det Fordi; 11. Interlude; 12. Du Er Så Dygtig; 13. Tag Dine Ting (Igen); 14. Vi Gør Dig Ikke Noget; 15. Vil Du Med; 16. Kan Du Ikk' Li' Mig (feat. Niarn & N.I.S); 17. Hvad Skal Jeg; 18. Interlude; 19. Har Jeg Ikke Set Dig Før; 20. Vil Du, Vil Du; 21. Freak; 22. U-Dollar Tegn
Vi Skal Alle Gerne Ha' Mere - Player Mix, Vol. 1: Type: Mix album; Released: 2005	Track list: 1. High Roller (feat. L.O.C.; 2. Gangsta Bitch; 3. Ser Dig (Too short Tribute); 4. Du ska være min Player - Sir Hun; 5. Har ik sag et Ord (feat. Bai-D og Troo.L.S; 6. Kom! (Bedroom remix); 7. Fuck en Punchline; 8. Hoteller, Hennessey og Hos; 9. Hva ska jeg gøre Ahmad.k (remix); 10. Den Sidste 50er 11. Freaky og Farlig (Broke Ass remix)
Hold Nu: Released: 2007	Track list: 1. Intro - 1.34; 2. Hold Nu - 4.31; 3. Barca Trøje - 3.57; 4. Hva' Sker Der (feat. Marwan) - 4.17; 5. Pisser Alle Af! - 4.45; 6. Fra Bilen - 3.51; 7. Hva' Tror Du Selv! - 3.53; 8. Hvor Rig Er Du? (feat. Sahra Da Silva) - 3.59; 9. Mit Hjem - 5.22; 10. Inderst Inde (feat. Søs Fenger) - 3.51; 11. Opfører Mig Pænt - 3.57; 12. Fuck Med Mig Mayn! (feat. Suspekt) - 3.44; 13. Chupa Chups (Du Så Vild)- 4.45; 14. Ingen Diskussion (feat. L.O.C. & Johnson) - 3.53; 15. Træt Af Alle De Stemmer - 4.05; 16. Ingen Diskussion (feat. L.O.C. & Johnson) (Remix) (Bonus Track) - 3.52
USupermayn: Type: Mixtape; Released: 2009	Track list: 1. Intro; 2. Alt For Meget; 3. Supermayn; 4. Drik Med En Rapper; 5. Amy Spritzvin; 6. Børnepenge; 7. Fuck At Date Hende; 8. Celina Ree; 9. Kig På Mig feat. Mester Jacob; 10. Vil Ik' Gi Dig; 11. Online Tricks; 12. Ruller Ondt; 13. Seksuel & Voksen; 14. Tidsmaskine feat. Marwan; 15. Verdensmester; 16. Hva Deeer feat. Johnson; 17. U-Dollar; 18. Du er en Gangsta; 19. Pimper Stadig; 20. Rejs Dig Nu
Got The Anlæg Going Åndssvag: Type: NP3; Mixes of Mester Jacob and White Noize (self-financed); Released: 2009	Track list: 1. Intro; 2. Celina Reemix; 3. 10/10; 4. Gi Den Op feat. Joey Moe; 5. Født Til At Tabe; 6. Hva Så Dajiieea; 7. Kamera Fon; 8. Transformer Cash; 9. Let Som En Fjer feat. Jonny Hefty; 10. Missionen Er Umulig; 11. Arbejder Marwan; 12. Tag Din Top Af; 13. Min Kæreste Har En Kæreste; 14. Roomservice feat. Alex; 15. We So Internationale feat. Sparkz & Capo; 16. Got The Anlæg Going Åndsvag
Elektrisk: Released: 2012	Track list: 1. Den Store Scene; 2. Lyset (feat. Jon Nørgaard); 3. Uden At Kigge Tilbage; 4. Flyvende (feat. L.O.C.); 5. Står Her Endnu; 6. Fuldt Hus (feat. L.O.C., Johnson, Marwan, Mester Jacob, Niarn, Per Vers, Pede B, Johnny Hefty, Jøden, Cas, Young, Joey Moe, J-Spliff, Majid, Ataf, Tue Track); 7. Duetter; 8. In My Room (feat. Johnny P); 9. Klapper Af Den (feat. Kato); 10. Monster; 11. Elektrisk (feat. Shawnna); 12. Når Du Går; 13. Skru' Op! Pt. 2 (feat. Trina & Johnson)

=== Mixtapes ===
- 2010: Got The Anlæg Going Åndssvag

=== Singles ===
Year	Single	Peak position	Certification
Year	Single	DAN	Certification
2011	"Skru' op!"	-	
2012	"Står Her Endnu"	36	
2012	"Klapper af den" (feat. Kato)	3	

Featured in

Year	Single	Peak position		Certification
Year	Single	DAN	US	Certification
2010	"Hey Shorty (Yeah Yeah Pt. 2)" (Kato feat. U$O and Johnson)	2	-	
2011	"Momentet" (L.O.C. feat. U$O)	3	-	
2011	"Worldwide Choppers" (Tech N9ne featuring Busta Rhymes, Yelawolf, Twista, U$O, Ceza, D-Loc, JL of B.Hood & Twisted Insane)	-	104	
