= Outland's Official =

Studio album by Outlandish
- Released: 2000
- Genre: Hip-hop
- Label: RCA, Sony BMG

Outlandish chronology
Outland's Official (2000)	Bread & Barrels of Water (2003)

Outland's Official is the debut album by Outlandish released in 2000.

== Track listing ==
1. "Intro"
2. "Walou"^{1}
3. "Mano A Mano" (featuring Majid)
4. "Wherever"
5. "The Bond Between Us"
6. "Come On"
7. "Fatima's Hand"¹ (featuring Majid)
8. "CPH Moro" (featuring Majid & Creative)
9. "Love Joint"
10. "Stick 'Em Up" (N.V.)
11. "Ill Kebab"
12. "Renovadores" (featuring Majid, Acorn & Jokeren)
13. "Heads To The Sky"

^{1} Songs repeated on "Bread & Barrels Of Water"
