= Count to Ten (album) =

Count To Ten

Studio album by Tina Dico
- Released: 2007
- Genre: Pop rock
- Length: 49:33
- Label: Finest Gramophone

Tina Dico chronology
In the Red (2006)	Count To Ten (2007)	A Beginning, a Detour, an Open Ending (2008)

Count To Ten is a 2007 album by Tina Dico.

== Track listing ==
No.	Title	Length
1.	"Count To Ten"	4:38
2.	"On The Run"	3:50
3.	"Open Wide"	4:42
4.	"Night Cab"	3:34
5.	"You Know Better"	5:10
6.	"Sacre Coeur"	5:02
7.	"Craftsmanship And Poetry"	3:50
8.	"My Business"	4:57
9.	"Cruel To The Sensitive Kind"	5:52
10.	"Everybody Knows"	5:03
11.	"Night Cab (Epilogue)"	2:55

- Sacre Coeur is also a Roman Catholic Basilica in Paris, France.
