= Suspekt =

Danish hip hop group

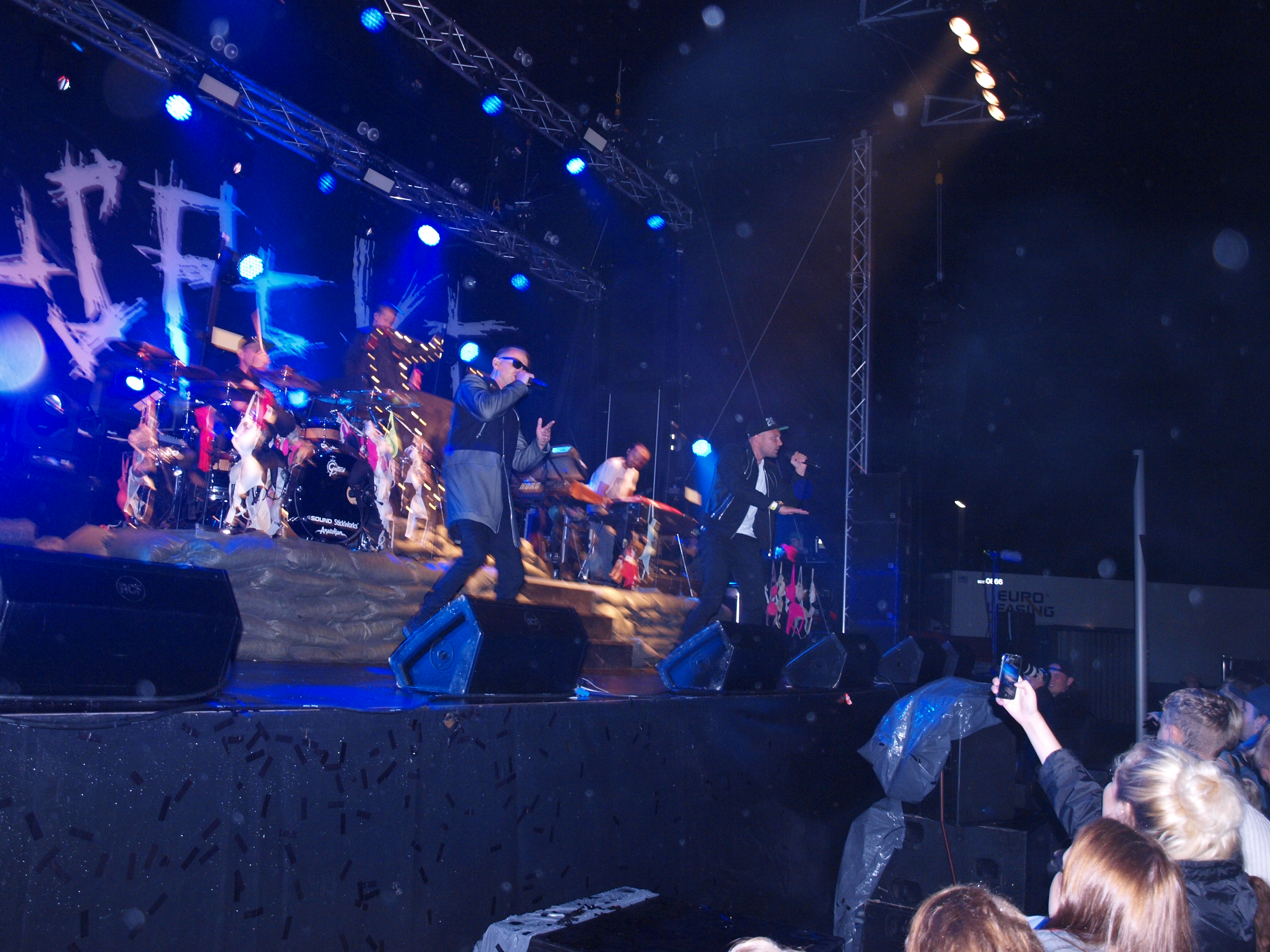

Background information
- Origin: Albertslund, Denmark
- Genres: Hip hop, horrorcore, dirty rap
- Years active: 1997–present
- Label: Tabu Records
- Members: Orgi-E; Bai-D; Rune Rask
- Past members: Troo.L.S

Suspekt is a Danish hip hop group. They are known for their dark, intense style, which has sometimes been described as horrorcore. The group consists of rappers Bai-D (Andreas Bai Duelund) and Orgi-E (Emil Simonsen), as well as producer Rune Rask. Former member Troo.L.S (Troels Nielsen) announced in 2008 that he would move to the United States to work, as a producer, with hip hop/R&B artist Akon.

In 1998, they founded the record label Tabu Records.

In 2009, the Suspekt members joined forces with rapper L.O.C., forming the group Selvmord.

== Collaborations ==
- The composer Frederik Magle has composed and arranged music for symphony orchestra on the album Elektra.

== Discography ==
=== Studio albums ===
Year	Album	Peak positions
Year	Album	DEN
1999	Suspekt	1
2003	Ingen slukker the Stars	20
2007	Prima Nocte	5
2011	Elektra	1
2014	V	1
2017	100% Jesus	1
2020	Sindssyge ting	1
2023	Ancient Aliens	2

=== Other albums ===
Year	Album	Peak positions
Year	Album	DEN
2009	Først var de bange	—
2015	Suspekt – Savklinge vinyl	10

=== Singles ===
Year	Title	Peak positions	Album
Year	Title	DEN	Album
2007	"Fuck af!"	10	Prima Nocte
2011	"Klaus Pagh"	1	Elektra
2011	"Helt alene" (feat. Tina Dickow)	21	Elektra
2014	"Søn af en pistol"	3	V
2014	"Bollede hende i går"	18	V
2014	"S.U.S.P.E.K.T."	8	V
2015	"Søndagsbarn" (feat. Lukas Graham)	3	
2016	"Hun blev bare så glad"	16	
2019	"Gonzo"	4	Sindssyge ting
2021	"Popo (lad mig se den igen)"	20	
2024	"Flere mål, 4–0" (with Rune Rask)	13	
2024	"Tænker ik på Andre" (with Uro)	1	
2026	"9 liv"	29	
2026	"Pizzaman"	33	

=== Other charted songs ===
Year	Title	Peak positions	Album
Year	Title	DEN	Album
2020	"Vil du med..."	3	Sindssyge ting
2020	"Mer prestige mer pastis" (featuring USO and Marwan)	33	Sindssyge ting
2020	"Fang mig i en brandert"	39	Sindssyge ting

== DVDs/Videos ==
- 2004: Danske videoer dér (Various Artists)
- 2004: Ingen slukker The Stars (DVD)
- 2008: Prima Nocte DVD – er du dum eller hva'!?
- 2009: Tabu-Records 10 års jubilæum

== Tabu Records ==
Suspekt have their own record label, Tabu Records, which they founded in 1998 Tabu Records consists of the Copenhagen-born Rune Rask, Emil Simonsen (Orgi-E), Andreas Bai Duelund (Bai-D), Troels Nielsen (Troo.L.S) and Kasper Færk. The record company has signed artists like Suspekt, VETO, JO:EL, Jeppe Rapp, Marwan, The Floor Is Made of Lava, Kasper Spez, Orgi-E, Troo.L.S
