= All I See Is You (disambiguation) =

All I See Is You is a 2016 American psychological drama film starring Blake Lively and Jason Clarke.

All I See Is You may also refer to:

== Other songs ==
- "All I See Is You", by Benjamin Ingrosso from Identification, 2018
- "All I See Is You", by Big Star from Keep an Eye on the Sky, 2009
- "All I See Is You", by Blue October from Spinning the Truth Around (Part 2), 2023
- "All I See Is You", by Dave Koz from Saxophonic, 2003
- "All I See Is You", by Tavares from Future Bound, 1978
- "All I See Is You", by The Cooper Temple Clause from Make This Your Own, 2007
- "Interlude: All I See Is You", by Tweet from Charlene, 2016
- "All I See Is You", by Dusty Springfield, 1966
- "All I See Is You", by Eddie and Sunshine, 1983
- "All I See Is You", by Full Intention, 2016
- "All I See Is You" (Afrojack Edit), by Jewelz & Sparks featuring Pearl Andersson, 2018
- "...All I See Is You...", by Larry Norman, 2007
- "All I See Is You", an unreleased song co-written by Natasha Bedingfield
- "All I See Is You", by Omnia featuring Christian Burns, 2016
- "All I See Is You", by Rabindra Danks featuring Rick Vito, 1973
- "All I See Is You", by Shane Smith and The Saints, 2015
- "All I See Is You", by The Cappetta Company featuring Suzie Cappetta

== Other works ==
- All I See Is You, a play starring Ciarán Griffiths in 2018
- "All I See Is You", a 2021 Yellowstone episode

== See also ==
- "All I See Is You, Velvet Brown", a 2021 song by Leon Vynehall from Rare, Forever
- All I See (disambiguation)
- You Are All I See (disambiguation)
- You're All I See (disambiguation)
