= Wen Wei Wang =

Chinese-Canadian businessman, choreographer, dancer, and teacher

- Born: 1965 (age 60–61); Xi'an, China
- Education: Langzhou Army Song and Dance Company, People's Liberation Army Academy of Art
- Occupations: Businessman, choreographer, dancer, teacher
- Career
- Current group: Ballet Edmonton, Wen Wei Dance
- Former groups: Ballet BC, Les Grands Ballet Canadiens, Judith Marcuse Dance Company
- Website: wenweidance.ca

Wen Wei Wang (born 1965) is a Chinese-Canadian businessman, choreographer, dancer, and teacher. Born in Xi'an, China, he moved to Vancouver permanently in 1991. He established the dance company Wen Wei Dance in 2003 and has since created 8 full-length works for the company. He is currently the artistic director of both Wen Wei Dance and Ballet Edmonton as of 2018.

== Early life and career ==
Wang's parents had hoped he would be involved in different art forms like painting or music, but his love of dance propelled his professional career. He began training at the Langzhou Army Song and Dance Company at the age of 12. In four years was he promoted to a full-time company dancer position at only 16. Wang trained in Russian style ballet as well as other movement forms like; Chinese folk dancing, tai chi, and martial arts. All these various movement studies inform his choreography today. Wang moved to Vancouver in 1986 on a short term cultural exchange with Lorita Leung Chinese Dance Company. He danced and taught for the company on his five-month tenure before moving back to China. Once back in China, he began choreographing and won his first award in 1986 in Gansu Province. He then began his education at People's Liberation Army Academy of Art in Beijing, participating in the country's only university-level choreography program at the time.

== Moving to Canada ==
Wang moved to Vancouver in 1991 when he was invited to the Contemporary Arts Summer Institute hosted by Simon Fraser University. From 1991 onwards, Wang resided in Vancouver full-time where he danced with Judith Marcuse Dance Company for two seasons and Ballet BC for seven seasons. He also participated in a choreography summer session with SFU in 1993 and briefly moved to Montreal to dance with Les Grands Ballet Canadiens for one season in 1995.

Wang also taught as a freelance teacher during the same period he danced professionally with Judith Marcuse, Ballet BC, and Les Grands Ballet Canadiens. He taught for various local institutions such as; Goh Ballet, Dancers Dancing, Arts Umbrella Junior Company, and the Chinese Cultural Centre. His career as a full-time teacher and choreographer followed his performance career. Outside of Wen Wei Dance, Wang has made pieces for Ballet BC, Ballet Jörgen, Alberta Ballet, North West Dance Project, a Vancouver Opera Production: Nixon in China, and for the San Francisco Opera Production of Nixon in China. In 2005, Wang partnered with Edam Dance's Peter Bingham. Together they created and performed Thirst in 2005.

== Company career ==
Wang formed his own company called Wen Wei Dance in 2003 after the premiere of his work Tao. Early on, the company was invited to tour internationally. Wang's solo work, One Man's, was created in 2005 and performed in the 7th Temporada Internacional de Danza Contemporanea Colombia.

Wen Wei Dance's 2006 work, a commission from CanDance Network, premiered in Ontario. The premiere was well-received and the company was afforded additional international touring opportunities in Italy, China, and across Canada.

In 2009, Wang began a collaborative process with Beijing Modern Dance Company creating pieces for the company with co-choreographer Gao Yanijzi. Under The Skin was their first work together and premiered in Ottawa in 2010. They later co-choreographed a production called Made In China that premiered in Banff, Alberta in 2015. The piece focused on their shared Chinese heritage.

In recent years Wen Wei Dance premiered two pieces, one of which the cast is all male and the other completely female. The former, Dialogue (2017), focuses on ideas of communication, mis-communication, language barrier, and sexuality. The latter, Ying Yun (2019), was named after and created for Wang's late mother. The piece features five women.

== Works ==
- At The Corner (2002) – Ballet Jörgen
- Four Dimensions (2003) – Ballet Jörgen
- Tao (2003) – Wen Wei Dance
- Thirst (2005) – Edam Dance
- One Man's (2005) – Wen Wei Dance
- Unbound (2006) – Wen Wei Dance
- Three Sixty Five (2007) – Wen Wei Dance
- Cockpit (2009) – Wen Wei Dance
- Chi (2009) – Northwest Dance Project
- Sections of Nixon In China (2010) – Vancouver Opera House
- Under The Skin (2010) – Wen Wei Dance with Beijing Modern Dance Company
- In Motion (2011) – Ballet BC
- Sections of Nixon In China (2012) – San Francisco Opera
- Night Box (2012) – Les Ballets Jazz de Montreal
- 7th Sense (2013) – Wen Wei Dance
- Made in China (2015) – Wen Wei Dance with Beijing Modern Dance Company
- Dialogue (2017) – Wen Wei Dance
- Swan (2017) – Ballet BC
- X-Body (2018) – Ballet Edmonton
- Last Words (2018) – Ballet Edmonton
- You Are All I See (2018) – Northwest Dance Project
- Ying Yun (2019) – Wen Wei Dance
- Le Quattro (2019) – Ballet Edmonton

== Awards ==
- 2000 : Clifford E. Lee Choreography Award
- 2006 : Isadora Award for Choreography (Unbound)
- 2009 : Rio Tinto Alcan Award (Cockpit)
- 2013 : Chrystal Dance Prize with Dance Victoria (Co-Winner with Gao Yanjinzi)
- 2013 : Top 25 Canadian Immigrant Award
