= Bread & Barrels of Water =

Bread & Barrels Of Water

Studio album by Outlandish
- Released: 2002
- Genre: Hip hop
- Label: RCA, Sony BMG
- Producer: Mintman - Saqib

Outlandish chronology
Outland's Official (2000)	Bread & Barrels Of Water (2002)	Beats, Rhymes & Life (2004)

Bread & Barrels of Water is the second album by Outlandish. It was released in 2002. This album is considered the real start of Outlandish. The international version of Bread & Barrels Of Water released at 2004 and it gave Outlandish increased popularity. This band became the first Danish (artist) band ever to hit the top of the charts around the world. Additionally, two songs from this album (Walou & Aicha) are chosen to be at the best 500 songs of the decade. The album reached number one in Denmark, Iceland, Norway & South Korea and it sold 2 million copies worldwide.

== Track listing ==
1. "Introduction"
2. "Guantanamo" - (reached #1 Denmark)
3. "Peelo"
4. "Walou"
5. "Aicha"
6. "Gritty"
7. "Interlude"
8. "If Only"
9. "Fatima’s Hand" (feat. Majid)
10. "El Moro" (feat. Majid)
11. "Eyes Never Dry"
12. "A Donkey Named Cheetah" (feat. Majid)
13. "Dirty Dirty East"
14. "Life is a Loom"

== Release history ==
Region	Date
Denmark	2002
Europe	2003

== Charts ==
=== Weekly charts ===
Chart (2003)	Peak position
Austrian Albums (Ö3 Austria)	14
Danish Albums (Hitlisten)	1
Dutch Albums (Album Top 100)	24
Finnish Albums (Suomen virallinen lista)	16
German Albums (Offizielle Top 100)	10
Swedish Albums (Sverigetopplistan)	14
Swiss Albums (Schweizer Hitparade)	11

=== Year-end charts ===
Chart (2003)	Position
German Albums (Offizielle Top 100)	90
Swiss Albums (Schweizer Hitparade)	88
