= Elektra (Suspekt album) =

Studio album by Suspekt
- Released: 12 September 2011
- Recorded: 2011
- Genre: Hip-hop, horrorcore, classical
- Length: 40:44
- Label: Universal, Tabu Records
- Producer: Rune Rask, Jonas Vestergaard

Suspekt chronology
Prima Nocte (2007)	Elektra (2011)

Elektra is the fourth studio album from Danish hip hop group Suspekt, released 12 September 2011. It is produced by Rune Rask and Jonas Vestergaard. The symphony orchestra Czech Film Orchestra is featured on Brænder Byen Ned (Burning Down The City), Helt Alene (All Alone), Nyt Pas (New Passport, which features a 3 minutes classical music ending), and Parasitter (Parasites). The orchestral music was recorded in the Rudolfinum Concert Hall, Prague, and was composed and orchestrated by Frederik Magle who also plays pipe organ on Parasitter. Danish singer Tina Dickow is featured on Helt Alene.

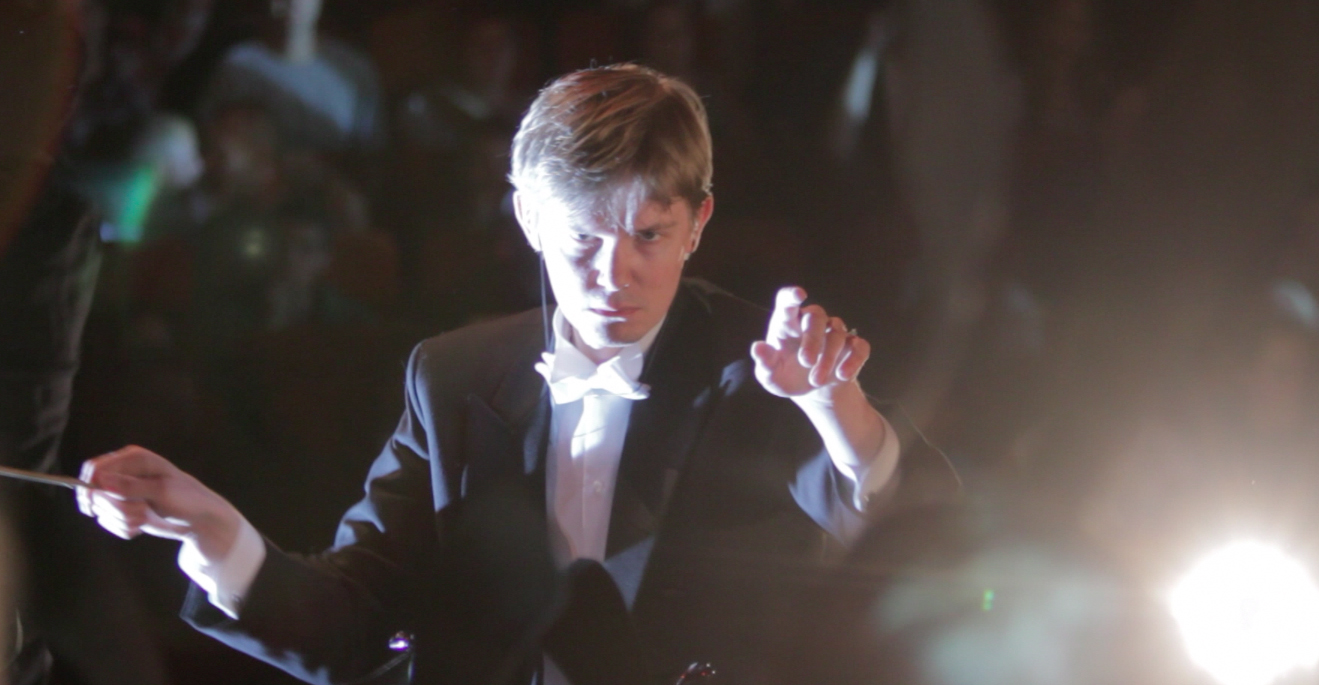
Frederik Magle conducting the orchestra in Koncerthuset at the release concert.

The album was presented in public for the first time at the release concert in Koncerthuset (Copenhagen), 10 September 2011. The concert was reviewed by the music magazine Gaffa, who gave it 6 stars

Elektra was favorably reviewed by Danish press including reviews in all major newspapers upon its release. The album was certified gold in November 2011.

Kendrick Lamar and executive producer Dr. Dre used "Helt Alene" as the main sample for the track "The Art of Peer Pressure" on Kendrick's album good kid, m.A.A.d city.

== Track listing ==
1. "Brænder byen ned" – 3:32
2. "Elektra - Requiem" – 1:08
3. "Ruller tungt" – 3:07
4. "Klaus Pagh – 3:20
5. "Far gir en is" – 2:08
6. "Helt alene" (feat. Tina Dickow) – 4:26
7. "Elektra" – 3:47
8. "Vi ses i helvede" – 3:27
9. "Nyt pas" – 5:22
10. "The Valley – 3:25
11. "Weekend kriger" – 3:04
12. "Parasitter" – 4:06
