= Warrior // Worrier =

Studio album by Outlandish
- Released: 28 May 2012
- Genre: Hip hop
- Label: Sony

Outlandish chronology
Sound of a Rebel (2009)	Warrior // Worrier (2012)

Warrior // Worrier is the fifth studio album by Denmark-based band Outlandish. It was released on 28 May 2012 by Sony Music. The album received Gold certification from the International Federation of the Phonographic Industry in Denmark.

== Tracklist ==
1. "Gypsy Cab" (3:48)
2. "Warrior//Worrier" (4:30)
3. "Barrio" (3:53)
4. "Sky Is Ours" (3:42)
5. "Better Days" (3:54)
6. "The Start" (5:00)
7. "Ready to Love" (3:55)
8. "Breathin' Under Water" (feat. Amir Sulaiman) (3:25)
9. "A Mind Full of Whispers" (3:45)
10. "Into the Night" (3:53)
11. "Gangsta Like Crazy" (4:21)
12. "Dreamin' & Streamin'" (feat. Rune RK) (3:36)
13. "Triumf" (feat. Providers) (3:25)
