= In the Red (Tina Dico album) =

Studio album by Tina Dico
- Released: 24 January 2006
- Genre: Pop rock
- Length: 52:19
- Label: Defend Music

Tina Dico chronology
Far (2004)	In the Red (2006)	Count to Ten (2007)

Professional ratings
Review scores
Source	Rating
AllMusic	4/5 stars

In the Red is a 2006 album by Tina Dico.

== Track listing ==
No.	Title	Length
1.	"Losing"	3:51
2.	"Warm Sand"	3:52
3.	"Nobody's Man"	4:02
4.	"The City"	4:22
5.	"Give In"	3:50
6.	"In the Red"	5:50
7.	"Head Shop"	3:54
8.	"Use Me"	3:43
9.	"Room with a View"	4:27
10.	"My Mirror"	4:16
11.	"One"	5:50
12.	"Long Goodbye"	4:19

Three songs on the album are new versions of previously released songs. An early version of "My Mirror" was released on Fuel (2001), while "Warm Sand" and "Room with a View" were originally released on the album Notes (2003).

=== Special edition ===
In 2007, a 2-disc 'Special Edition' of In the Red was released, featuring 11 tracks from an acoustic show at the Copenhagen Jazzhouse recorded on April 24, 2006, plus two B-sides. "Don't Think Twice, It's All Right" is listed as "Don't Think Twice" on the CD's back cover.

Bonus disc
No.	Title	Length
1.	"One"	3:31
2.	"Break of Day"	4:06
3.	"Craftsmanship and Poetry"	3:46
4.	"Use Me"	3:16
5.	"Room with a View"	3:33
6.	"Don't Think Twice, It's All Right" (Bob Dylan cover)	2:59
7.	"Magic"	4:10
8.	"Warm Sand"	4:51
9.	"Undone"	4:48
10.	"In the Red"	5:59
11.	"Back Where We Started"	4:25
12.	"When You're Away" (B-side of "Warm Sand")	4:25
13.	"Lost in Art" (B-side of "Losing")	5:11

== Charts ==
Chart (2006)	Peak position
Danish Albums (Hitlisten)	1
German Albums (Offizielle Top 100)	84
