= Orgi-E =

Danish rapper

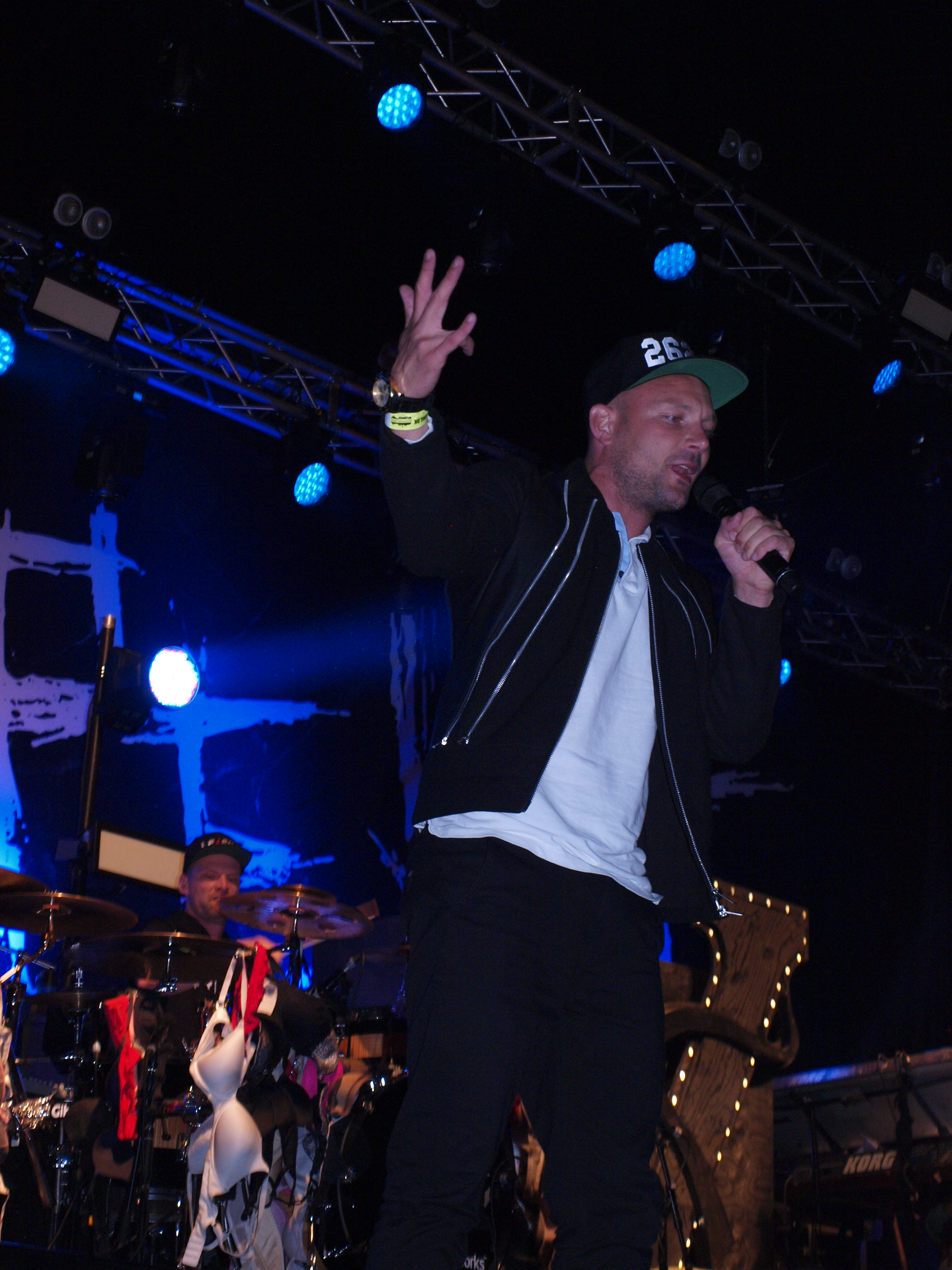
Orgi-E (2015)

Emil Simonsen better known by his stage name Orgi-E (born in 1979 in Denmark) is a Danish rapper who in 1997 became part of the formation Suspekt alongside Rune Rask and Bai-D (Andreas Bai Duelund). He has also developed his solo career independent of the group. In 2005, he cooperated with Troo.L.S, a previous member of Suspekt in the album Forklædt som voksen. In 2012 his solo album Klamfyr released on Tabu Records reached #1 on the Danish Albums Chart in its first week of release.

== Discography ==
=== Albums ===
Year	Album	Peak position	Certification
Year	Album	DK	Certification
2012	Klamfyr	1	

Collaborations

Year	Album	Peak position	Certification
Year	Album	DK	Certification
2005	Forklædt som voksen (Troo.L.S & Orgi-E)	10	

Suspekt albums

Year	Album	Peak position	Certification
Year	Album	DK	Certification
2011	Elektra	1	Gold

=== Singles ===
Year	Single	Peak position	Certification	Album
Year	Single	DK	Certification	Album
2012	"Singlepik"	13		Klam fyr
2012	"City2musik (Hva glor du på)"	20		Klam fyr
