= L.O.C. (rapper) =

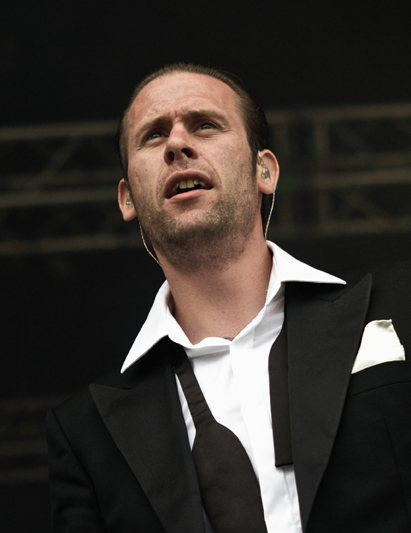
- L.O.C. performing at Grøn Koncert 2009 in Aalborg, 19 July 2009

Background information
- Also known as: L.O.C., Mr. Astair, Mr. Jim Beam
- Born: Liam Nygaard O'Connor; 10 July 1979 (age 47); Aarhus, Denmark
- Genres: Hip hop, rap
- Occupations: Rapper, songwriter
- Instrument: Vocal
- Years active: 1997–present
- Labels: Virgin Records (2001-2011); SGMD (2012-present)
- Website: www.loc.nu

Liam Nygaard O'Connor (born 10 July 1979), better known as L.O.C., is a Danish rapper, songwriter and TV-host.

== Biography ==
Born to Danish mother Susan Nygaard O'Conner and Irish father Dermot O'Conner. He started his career in 1995 together with Chadi Abdul-Karim (C.A.K.), when they started the group Alzheimer Klinikken. Two years later they released their first demotape "Respekten Stinker" (The Respekt Stinks). L.O.C.'s popularity made his group project B.A.N.G.E.R.S rise to quite the recognition in 1999 when they released the EP "V.I.P.". The group projekt consisted of, further than L.O.C., the Danish rappers USO, Marc Johnson and DJ Rescue. L.O.C. also formed the Danish Hip-Hop group F.I.P. in collaboration with Danish producers Rune Rask and Troo.L.S from Danish rap group Suspekt

L.O.C. quickly gained a greater popularity in 2001 with his debut album "Dominologi". In 2003 L.O.C. released the album "Inkarneret", which went platinum in 2004, with over 60,000 copies sold. His third album, "Cassiopeia", was released in 2005 and amongst other, contained the hit single "Du Gør Mig" (You Make Me). His fourth album "Melankolia / XXX Couture " was released on 17 March 2008 and sold over 20,000 copies in the first week. The single "XXX Coture" was made Danish Radio's Program 3 (P3) 'inevitable song of the week' and won the "Album of The Year"-price at The Danish Music Awards in 2009. L.O.C. has with his first four albums sold over 150,000 copies, which makes him the best selling rapper in Denmark. In 2009 L.O.C. formed the group Selvmord in collaboration with the Danish rap group Suspekt. They released their first album with the self titled "Selvmord" (Suicide) which became an instant success and went gold and also contained the hit single "Råbe Under Vand" (Yelling Under Water).

L.O.C.'s fifth album "Libertiner" was released in 2011 and won "Danish Urban Release of The Year" at Danish Music Awards 2011. "Libertiner" was also in the top ten of the most sold albums in Denmark in 2011.

In 2011, L.O.C. was one of the judges in TV2's adaptation of the music competition Voice. He coached Kim Wagner, who won the contest. He was furthermore also a judge in season two of the same program.

In 2012, L.O.C. created his own record company SGMD, which is an acronym for "SelvGjortMillionærDrøm" (SelfMadeMillionaireDream) and started a cooperative deal with the telecommunications company TDC A/S, which distributed and promoted his sixth album "Prestige, Paranoia, Persona Vol. 1". The album was put up for free download the first five weeks and on was downloaded over 100,000 times on the release date alone. On 1 October 2012, L.O.C.'s seventh album, "Prestige, Paranoia, Persona Vol. 2" was released in cooperation with Danish Red Cross whom received all profits from the sales.

== Private life ==
Since 2008, L.O.C. has been in a relationship with Danish actress and TV-host Cristiane Schaumburg-Müller; they were married on 22 December 2012 at Valdemars Castle in Denmark.

== Discography ==
=== Albums ===
- 1997: Respekten Stinker (Respect Stinks) (Alzheimer Klinikken)
- 1998: Første Træk (First Move) (Alzheimer Klinikken)
- 1999: V.I.P. Very Important Perker (B.A.N.G.E.R.S.) (Rescue Records)

Solo

Year	Album	Peak position	Certification
Year	Album	DEN	Certification
2001	Dominologi	32	DEN: 2× Platinum
2003	Inkarneret	6	DEN: 4× Platinum
2005	Cassiopeia	1	DEN: 4× Platinum
2006	Cassiopeia Limited Edition	—	
2008	Melankolia/XxxCouture	1	DEN: 3× Platinum
2011	Libertiner	1	DEN: Platinum
2012	Prestige, Paranoia, Persona Vol. 1	7	
2012	Prestige, Paranoia, Persona Vol. 2	1	DEN: Platinum
2014	Sakrilegium	40	DEN: Platinum
2015	Grand cru	2	
2016	Anno XV	1	DEN: Platinum
2019	Ekkokammer	6	
2021	Fuck L.O.C.	20	
2021	Extra	27	
"—" means no official position on the charts.

=== Mixtapes ===
- 2007: Nyt fra Vestfronten (News from the Western Front)
- 2008: Nyt fra Vestfronten 2
- 2009: Nyt fra Vestfronten 3

=== Singles ===
Year	Song	Peak	Certification	Album
Year	Song	DEN	Certification	Album
2008	"XXXCouture"	1		Melankolia / XXXCouture
2008	"Hvorfor vil du ikk?"	11		Melankolia / XXXCouture
2008	"Superbia"	15		Melankolia / XXXCouture
2011	"Ung for evigt"	2		Libertiner
2011	"Libertiner" (feat. Johan Olsen)	23		Libertiner
2011	"Momentet" (feat. U$O)	3		Libertiner
2011	"Langt ude"	22		Libertiner
2012	"Noget dumt"	3		Prestige, Paranoia, Persona Vol. 1
2012	"Helt min egen"	1		Prestige, Paranoia, Persona Vol. 1
2014	"Marquis"	1		Sakrilegium
2014	"Paradis Brænder"	—		Sakrilegium
2016	"Ti fod høj"	22		
2019	"Drømmen er vores"	17		

Featured in

Year	Song	Peak	Certification	Album
Year	Song	DEN	Certification	Album
2007	"Hospital" (Nephew feat. L.O.C.)	1		
2009	"Kun for dig" (Medina feat. L.O.C.)	1		
2014	"Karma" (Burhan G feat. L.O.C.)	1		

== Videography ==
- 2002: "Drik Din Hjerne Ud" (Drink Your Brains Out)
- 2002: "Absinthe"
- 2003: "Pop Det Du Har" (Pop What You Got)
- 2003: "Undskyld" (Sorry)
- 2004: "Hvem" (Who)
- 2005: "Frk. Escobar" (Miss Escobar)
- 2005: "De Sidste Tider" (The Last Times)
- 2005: "Du Gør Mig..." (You Make Me...)
- 2008: "XXXCouture"
- 2008: "Hvorfor vil du ikk'" (Why Won't You)
- 2008: "Superbia" feat. Simon Kvamm
- 2008: "Bare en Pige" (Just a Girl)
- 2011: "Ung For Evigt" (Young Forever)
- 2011: "Langt Ude"
- 2012: "Jeg er Judas" feat. Gigolo Jesus
- 2012: "Skyd Mig Ned" (Shoot me down)
- 2012: "Helt Min Egen" (Totally my own)

Collaborations

- 2003: "Skudtæt" by Suspekt and L.O.C.(Bulletproof)
- 2005: "Få Din Flaske På" by L.O.C. feat. Suspekt (Get Your Bottle On)
- 2006: "Gravøl" by Jokeren feat. L.O.C. and Niarn
- 2007: "Ingen Diskussion" by U$O feat. L.O.C. and Johnson (No Discussion)
- 2007: "Hospital" by Nephew feat. L.O.C.
- 2009: "Råbe Under Vand" – Selvmord (Screaming under the water)
- 2009: "OK" – Selvmord
- 2011: "Momentet" – L.O.C. feat. U$O (The moment)

== Filmography ==
- 2004: V/A – Danske Videoer Dér
- 2004: Ingen Slukker The Stars DVD – Suspekt
- 2005: 5 År Og Like Langt DVD –Tungtvann
- 2006: Antihelt Limited Edition DVD Niarn
- 2007: 07.07.07 Nephew
- 2008: XxxManilla – L.O.C.
- 2008: Prima Nocte Suspekt
