= Isam Bachiri =

Moroccan rapper and singer born in Denmark (born 1977)

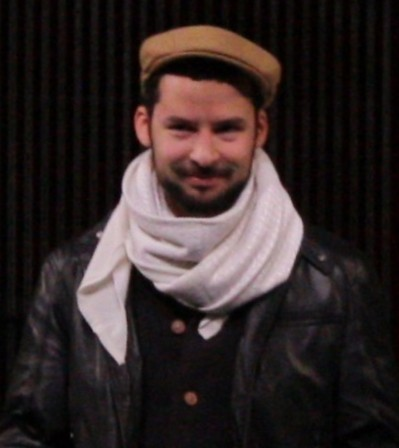

Background information
- Born: 1 August 1977 (age 49); Copenhagen, Denmark
- Genres: Hip hop, electronic
- Years active: 1997-present
- Label: Sony BMG Awakening
- Formerly of: Outlandish
- Website: http://www.outlandish.dk

Isam Bachiri (Arabic: عصام بشيري - born 1 August 1977), known by his stage name Isam B, is a Danish rapper, singer and songwriter. Formerly a member of the hip-hop group Outlandish, he has worked as a solo artist in recent years.

== Early life ==
Isam Bachiri is a Muslim of Moroccan Riffian descent born in 1977 in Copenhagen, Denmark.

Bachiri came into contact with music in his youth through the developing hip hop scene and subculture in America.

== Career ==
Between 1997 and 2017 Bachiri joined Waqas Ali Qadri and Lenny Martinez to form the Danish hip-hop group Outlandish, drawing upon the influences of their respective ethnic heritage, and in particular the Islamic faith of two of the band members.

== 'Ramadan in Copenhagen' in the Højskolesangbogen ==
In May 2019, a group of artists met to suggest songs for inclusion in the Danish Højskolesangbogen (folk highschool songbook) in order to better represent the nation's cultural diversity. Isam was one of the artists who participated in this meeting and discussion, and his song 'Ramadan i København' (Ramadan in Copenhagen) was one of the songs proposed for inclusion.

This led to some controversy, with the Danish People's Party using a social media post to object to the song's inclusion. Isam has since defended its inclusion, and notes the "great honour" of being included in the book, despite criticisms he has received as a result.

== Album ==
- Institution (2007) CD, Album) Genlyd 2000, Sony BMG Music Entertainment

Music Producer: Birk Nevel, Gustaf Ljunggren, Isam B, Jesper Haugaard, Morten Buchholtz, Søren Mikkelsen

- 2200 Carmen (CD, Album) (2009) Sony Music Entertainment

Music Producer: Isam B med band

- Lost For Words (2018)Warner Music Group

Music Producer: Ole Brodersen Meyer

== Singles&Ep ==
- Karen Isam B& Guld & Platin Sony Music Entertainment

Music Producer:Isam B& Guld & Platin

- Mad World (2010) Michael Parsberg Feat. Safri Duo & Isam B Disco wax, MP1

Music Producer: Michael Parsberg Feat. Safri Duo & Isam B

- Undone (Change Will Come) (2014) Sony Music Entertainment

Music Producer: Kay&Ndustry

- Faking A Smile (2015) Sony Music Entertainment

Music Producer: Kay&Ndustry

- Smile And Pretend (2017) Warner Music Group

Music Producer: Andreas "Maskinen" Sommer

- Life (2018) Warner Music Group

Music Producer: Mattis Jakobsen

- Peace Hymn (2018) Warner Music Group

Music Producer: Isam Bachiri, Morten Sewell Woods

- Man With A Plan (2018) Warner Music Group

Music Producer: Isam Bachiri

- Fortæl Fortæl (2022) Sony Music Entertainment

Music Composer, Producer: Kadir Demir, Kasper Falkenberg

== Book ==
Fædreland Fatherland
