= Troo.L.S =

Danish rapper and producer (born 1982)

- Born: Troels Nielsen; 1982 (age 43–44)
- Origin: Denmark
- Genres: Hip Hop, EDM, pop
- Occupations: Rapper, record producer, composer
- Years active: 1999–present

Troels Nielsen (born 1982) better known by his stage name Troo.L.S is a Danish musician and music producer from Albertslund, Copenhagen, Denmark.

His career debut was in the local Danish hip hop group Sidste Niveau. He also contributed to the group Suspekt and their self-titled album Suspekt in 1999. He later joined Suspekt, where he wrote, co-composed and also featured as a rapper on "Ingen Slukker The Stars" in 2003 and "Prima Nocte" in 2007.

In the 2005, an album called "Forklædt Som Voksen", a joint venture with Danish rapper Orgi-E, was released.

Troo.L.S' musical collaborations include Danish artists such as: L.O.C., U$O, Drengene Fra Angora and Anders Matthesen.

With Rune Rask, he co-wrote and composed the song "Gangsta Bop" that appears on Akon's album Konvicted.

For which the two received a Grammy Nomination.

In late 2007, he left Suspekt and subsequently signed to Akon's label Konvict and relocated to Atlanta, GA.

His productions feature artists such as Snoop Dogg, The Game and Tech N9ne.

== Discography ==
=== Albums ===
Year	Title	Contribution
1999	Suspekt (Suspekt)	Artist
2000	Kølig Kumpaner (Sidste Niveau)	Producer
2000	Tabu Recz (Tabu Recz)	Producer, Artist
2000	Mr. Malchau (Blaze It Up)	Producer
2001	L.O.C. (Dominologi)	Producer, Artist
2002	L.O.C., U$O, Troo.L.S (EP)	Producer, Artist
2003	Den Gale Pose (DGPlayers Remix)	Producer
2003	L.O.C. (Inkarneret)	Producer, Artist
2003	Jokeren (Alpha Han)	Artist
2004	U$O (JegVilGerneDuVilGerneViSkalGerne)	Producer
2004	Drengene Fra Angora (Drengene Fra Angora)	Producer
2005	L.O.C. (Cassiopeia)	Producer
2005	U$O (ViSkalAlleGerneHaMere Mixtape)	Producer, Artist
2005	Troo.L.S & Orgi-E (Forklædt Som Voksen)	Producer, Artist
2005	Jeppe Rapp (Ik Bare Et Par Sko EP)	Producer, Artist
2006	Anden (Soevnloes)	Producer
2006	Johnson (Det Passer)	Producer
2006	L.O.C. (Cassiopeia Limited Edition)	Producer
2006	Tech N9ne (EverReady The Religion)	Producer
2006	Akon (Konvicted)	Producer
2007	Nemo (Første Kapitel)	Producer, Artist
2007	Marwan (P.E.R.K.E.R.)	Producer, Artist
2007	L.O.C. (Nyt Fra Vestfronten Mixtape)	Producer, Artist
2007	Suspekt (Prima Nocte)	Producer, Artist
2007	The Game (Mixtape)	Producer
2008	U$O (Hold Nu)	Producer
2008	Szhirley (Hjerter Dame)	Producer
2009	Outlandish (Sound of a Rebel)	Producer
2009	Jooks (Priviligeret)	Producer
2011	Marwan (Mennesker)	Producer, Artist
2014	Uh Huh Her (Future Souls)	Producer
2014	Marwan (Marwan)	Producer, Artist
2020	Slip Away (Phlake & Mercedes The Virus)	Producer, Musician
