= Outlandish =

Danish hip-hop music group

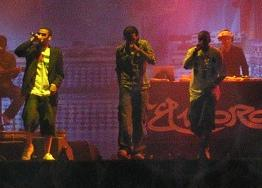

Background information
- Origin: Brøndby Strand, Denmark
- Genre: Hip hop
- Years active: 1997–2017; 2019–present
- Label: Labelmade
- Members: Waqas Ali Qadri; Lenny Martinez
- Past members: Isam Bachiri

Outlandish is a hip-hop music group based in Denmark. Formed in 1997, it currently consists of Waqas Ali Qadri and Lenny Martinez.

== Career ==
Their first formation consists of Isam Bachiri, Waqas Ali Qadri, and Lenny Martinez. All three members are religious, with Isam and Waqas being Muslims (of Moroccan and Pakistani origins, respectively) and Lenny being Catholic of Cuban and Honduran descent.

Their first single "Pacific to Pacific" was used in connection with an Amnesty International charity event. Next came the single "Saturday Night", a song that was later included on the soundtrack for the Danish film Pizza King.

The lyrics of their song "Look into My Eyes" are based on a poem by Gihad Ali, a Palestinian who wrote the piece when she was a teenager; the poem expresses the plight of those suffering from America's foreign policy with regards to Israel and Palestine. The video is based around the fairy-tale Little Red Riding Hood. It portrays an Israeli soldier as the Wolf and the Palestinian girl, wearing a keffiyeh (Arab scarf), as Little Red Riding Hood.

The singles from their second album Bread & Barrels of Water made a bigger impact on the international music charts, including their cover version of Khaled's "Aïcha", but with added English lyrics. The Outlandish version was a #1 hit in Germany and received a lot of airplay across Europe and Asia, especially on South Korean radio stations. "Guantanamo" also made a strong impression on the European charts.

Their single "Kom Igen" is featured on EA Sports game, FIFA 07.

Sound of a Rebel, Outlandish's fifth album was released on 11 May 2009. Its first single was "Rock All Day".

The group disbanded in 2017 as each member wanted to pursue personal projects. In 2019 band members Waqas and Lenny brought back the band as a duo while Isam continued to pursue a solo career. Outlandish has since released two singles and recently release a new album, titled The Cornershop Carnival.

The band reformed and returned in 2022.

An EP, Alabas, was released in June 2023.

== Appearances and activities ==
The band supported Sami Yusuf along with other nasheed artists at the "Concert for Peace in Darfur" held at Wembley Arena in 2007 in order to raise money for the families of genocide victims in the region.

The trio has participated in the Evening of Inspiration concerts (in aid of Islamic Relief charity) since 2006 and most recently participated in the 2008 concert which also featured Seven8Six, Raihan and Kareem Salama amongst fellow performers."

Outlandish performed a live percussion version of "Look into My Eyes" at the "Islamophobia" conference held in Copenhagen, Denmark in May 2006 which was hosted by the Islam Channel and included many theological and political speakers and community leaders.

Isam Bachiri features on the single "Still Strong" on Native Deen's album, Not Afraid To Stand Alone.

In 2004 during a concert in Musikhuset Aarhus Outlandish ordered a ban on alcohol sales during their performance because of the two Muslim members of the group. In 2019 Isam Bachiri stated about the episode with ban on alcohol sales that: ”… With regard to the ban of alcohol it was not a ban. We just asked to close down the bar while we performed. Prior and after the concert the people could do what they wanted. I have the belief I have, and it can tarnish one’s reputation when one is a public person and sticks the nose in".

In 2006 the Danish tabloid newspaper BT reported that the two Muslim members of the group had the Norwegian singer Herborg Kråkevik removed to another point on stage in a Danish television program on the grounds that she had bare shoulders. A press responsible person from the record label of the group commented that it "is part of their religion. But I don't think Herborg Kråkevik minded." The chairmen of the Youth of the Danish People's Party and the president of the Danish Women's Society criticized the incident, whereas the Danish Broadcasting Corporation stated that it had not made any changes in the program because of Outlandish, but at the same time stated that they could not speak on the behalf of the 200 persons which were involved with the show. Herborg Kråkevik, the implicated female singer, stated about the issue that: "Yes. There was something about my bare shoulders, but we solved it. I don’t think it is good if I say something about it. I obviously have many fans in Denmark". Outlandish themselves issued a press statement in which they dissociated themselves from the accusations of BT.

In 2007 Isam Bachiri and Waqas Qaadri performed at the large annual Canadian Muslim event Reviving the Islamic Spirit. At that occasion, the Danish tabloid BT wrote that the group performed for "extreme islamists", and that phrases like "the homosexuals should be punished with death" and "the Jews will encounter their demise" appeared at the conference. Outlandish denied the accusations. They stated that the conference was a peaceful Muslim convention whose main goal is to create integration and peaceful coexistence between Muslims and Non-Muslims in North America and mentioned that the highly respected American rabbi Michael Lerner had been an honorary guest and speaker at the conference. Associate Professor Torben Ruberg Rasmussen from University of Southern Denmark backed the statements of the group and he commented that: "There is no reason to condemn the event, and it is not a case of closet radicalism or anything reminding of that."

== Discography ==
- Outland's Official (2000)
- Bread & Barrels of Water (2002)
- Closer Than Veins (2005)
- Sound of a Rebel (2009)
- Warrior // Worrier (2012)
- The Cornershop Carnival (2023)
