= Niarn =

Danish rapper

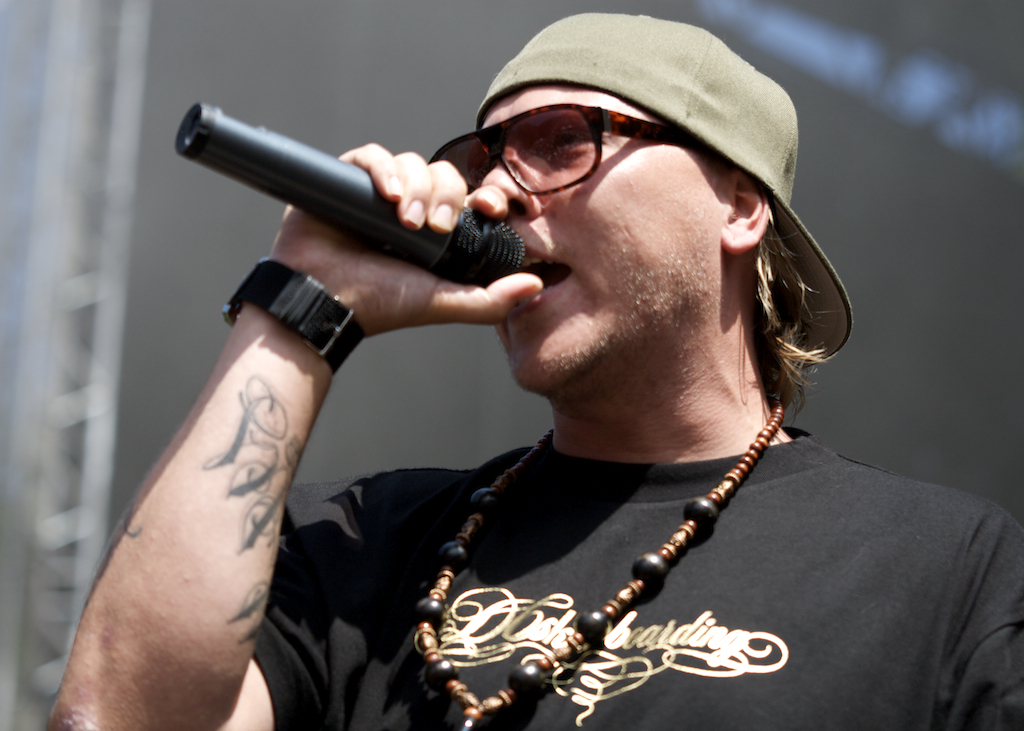

Background information
- Born: 10 July 1979 (age 47); Gug, Aalborg, Denmark
- Origin: Denmark
- Genre: Rap
- Occupation: Rapper
- Years active: 1995-2014 (as Niarn) 2014-now (as Niels Roos)
- Label: Copenhagen
- Website: https://www.nielsroos.dk/

Niels Shahverdi Roos (born 10 July 1979 in Gug near Aalborg), better known as Niarn, is a Danish rapper. Signed to Copenhagen Records, he has released five albums including the Danish chart-topping album Antihelt.

== Discography ==
=== Studio albums ===
Year	Album	Peak positions	Certification
Year	Album	DEN	Certification
2002	Glenn Francisco	–	
2004	Årgang '79	17	
2006	Antihelt	1	
2009	Rød Aalborg	7	
2014	Kommer aldrig igen	17	
2022	Stadig Årgang 79	22	

=== Singles ===
Year	Single	Peak positions	Album
Year	Single	DEN	Album
2006	"Glenn Francisco"	3	Glenn Francisco
2008	"Undskyld (Jeg var fuld)"	28	Rød Aalborg
2014	"Ingen tårer ingen ord" (feat. Pia Cohn & Bifrost))	28	Kommer aldrig igen
