= Burhan G (album) =

Studio album by Burhan G
- Released: 12 April 2010
- Recorded: 2009
- Label: Copenhagen Records
- Producer: Jon & Jules (Jon Andersson Ørom and Johannes Jules Wolfson) of Nexus

Burhan G chronology
Breakout (2007)	Burhan G (2010)	Burhan G Special Edition (2011)

Singles from Burhan G
- 1. "Kun dig" Released: 30 May 2008; 2. "Jeg vil ha' dig for mig selv" Released: 15 June 2009; 3. "Mest ondt" Released: 8 March 2010; 4. "Tættere på himlen" Released: 23 August 2010; 5. "Søvnløs" Released: 31 January 2011

Burhan G is the third studio album from the Danish R&B singer Burhan G which was released on 12 April 2010 at Copenhagen Records. This is however his first Danish language album after two all-English language albums Playground in 2004 and Breakout in 2007. The album Burhan G was developed with the collaboration of Rasmus Seebach and Nik & Jay and producers Jon & Jules (Jon Andersson Ørom and Johannes Jules Wolfson) of Nexus. The album reached #2 in the Danish Albums Chart making it the most successful album thus far of Burhan G.

The album's first single, "Kun dig" (translated as "Only You") came in late May 2008. The second single "Jeg vil ha' dig for mig selv" (translated as "I Want You for Myself") followed in June 2009. It was written in collaboration with Rasmus Seebach, and samples Milli Vanilli's 1988 hit "Girl You Know It's True". Parts of the lyrics are taken from Nik & Jay's "I Love Ya". In November 2009, Nik & Jay released a version with their own vocals. On 8 March 2010 the third single from the album "Mest Ondt" (translated as "What Hurts the Most"). The song was written by Burhan G and Sarah West and featured the guest singer Medina. The song was Burhan G's first ever number one hit on the Hitlisten, the Danish Singles Chart. Following the big success of the song, Burhan G released yet another single from the album "Tættere på himlen" (translated as "Closer to Heaven") this time featuring Nik & Jay, which again reached #1 in the Danish charts.

Burhan G explains his reasoning behind making the album in Danish in a press release: "I made this record in Danish mainly because I love music and because I love all the different ways of expressing them. I had made English albums so far. But then I began to delve into old Danish pop classics from various artists like Kim Larsen and Sanne Salomonsen and many others and took on myself to convey myself this way".

== Track list (2010) ==
1. "I stedet for dig" (3:40)
2. "Jeg vil ha' dig for mig selv" (3:44)
3. "Mest ondt" (featuring Medina) (3:53)
4. "Hvor er du" (3:48)
5. "Tættere på himlen" (featuring Nik & Jay) (4:46)
6. "Sommerregn" (4:24)
7. "Kun dig" (3:47)
8. "Kryptonit" (3:53)
9. "Søvnløs" (4:02)
10. "Min sang til dig" (4:51)

== Burhan G Special Edition (2011) ==
Burhan G Special Edition

Studio album by Burhan G
- Released: 3 October 2011
- Recorded: 2009
- Label: Copenhagen Records
- Producer: Jon & Jules (Jon Andersson Ørom and Johannes Jules Wolfson) of Nexus

Burhan G chronology
Burhan G (2010)	Burhan G Special Edition (2011)	Din for evigt (2013)

Singles from Burhan G Special Edition
- 1. "Tag hvad du vil" Released: 2011; 2. "Jeg' i live"" Released: 26 August 2011

With the great success of self-titled album Burhan G in 2010, he released Burhan G Special Edition on 3 October 2011 containing 15 tracks. They included 9 of the initial 10 tracks of the initial album. To the 9 tracks, he added 6 more tracks in the Special Edition. These included notably "Tag hvad du vil", a collaboration with Ankerstjerne that was released as a single and "Jeg' i live" also a single.

1. "I stedet for dig" (3:40)
2. "Jeg vil ha' dig for mig selv" (3:44)
3. "Mest ondt" (featuring Medina) (3:53)
4. "Hvor er du?" (3:48)
5. "Tættere på himlen" (featuring Nik & Jay) (4:46)
6. "Sommerregn" (4:24)
7. "Kun dig" (3:47)
8. "Kryptonit" (3:53)
9. "Søvnløs" (4:02)
10. "En sang til dig" (4:52)
11. "Jeg' i live (2011)" (3:14)
12. "Tag hvad du vil" (Ankerstjerne & Burhan G) (3:26)
13. "Jeg vil ha' dig for mig selv" (feat. Nik & Jay) (4:08)
14. "Smuk i nat" (2008)" (3:59)
15. "Tiden heler ingen sår" (2008) (3:40)

=== DVD ===
The release also came with a package that included DVD for Beta Sessions and with music videos as follows:

1. "I stedet for dig" (beta session)
2. "Jeg vil ha' dig for mig selv" (beta session)
3. "Søvnløs" (beta session)
4. "Mest ondt" (featuring Stine Bramsen; beta session)
5. "Tættere på himlen" (featuring Nik & Jay; beta session)
6. "Jeg vil ha' dig for mig selv" (music video)
7. "Mest ondt" (featuring Medina; music video)
8. "Tættere på himlen" (featuring Nik & Jay; music video)
9. "Søvnløs" (Music video)
1. "I stedet for dig" (3:40)
2. "Jeg vil ha' dig for mig selv" (3:44)
3. "Mest ondt" (featuring Medina) (3:53)
4. "Hvor er du" (3:48)
5. "Tættere på himlen" (featuring Nik & Jay) (4:46)
6. "Sommerregn" (4:24)
7. "Kun dig" (3:47)
8. "Kryptonit" (3:53)
9. "Søvnløs" (4:02)
10. "Min sang til dig"

== 2012 Burhan G rerelease ==
A 2012 release contained the same track list plus five more tracks:

1. "I stedet for dig" (3:40)
2. "Jeg vil ha' dig for mig selv" (3:44)
3. "Mest ondt" (featuring Medina) (3:53)
4. "Hvor er du" (3:48)
5. "Tættere på himlen" (featuring Nik & Jay) (4:46)
6. "Sommerregn" (4:24)
7. "Kun dig" (3:47)
8. "Kryptonit" (3:53)
9. "Søvnløs" (4:02)
10. "Min sang til dig" (4:51)
11. "Jeg' i live" (3:13)
12. "Tag hvad du vil" (Ankerstjerne featuring Burhan G) (3:22)
13. "Jeg vil ha' dig for mig selv" (featuring Nik & Jay) (4:08)
14. "Smuk i nat" (3:59)
15. "Tiden heler ingen sår" (3:41)

== Singles ==
There were 4 singles released from the album:

- "Kun dig"
- "Jeg vil ha' dig for mig selv"
- "Mest ondt" feat. Medina
- "Tættere på himlen" feat. Nik & Jay
- "Søvnløs"

== Charts ==
Year	Title	Highest position
Year	Title	DK
2011	Burhan G	2

== Certifications and sales ==
Region	Certification	Certified units/sales
Denmark (IFPI Danmark)	10× Platinum	200,000^{‡}
^{‡} Sales+streaming figures based on certification alone.
