= List of number-one hits of 2010 (Denmark) =

List of top-charting songs in Denmark

This article shows all the songs that has been number one on the official Danish singles chart, Tracklisten, in 2010, as compiled by Nielsen Music Control in association with the Danish branch of the International Federation of the Phonographic Industry (IFPI).

== Chart history ==
Artist	Single	Reached number 1	Weeks
Lady Gaga	"Bad Romance"	1 January 2010	3
The Rumour Said Fire	"The Balcony"	22 January 2010	3
Støt Haiti	"Skrøbeligt fundament"	12 February 2010	4
Cheryl Cole	"Fight for This Love"	12 March 2010	3
Thomas Ring	"My Dream"	2 April 2010	2
Lady Gaga featuring Beyoncé	"Telephone"	16 April 2010	1
Burhan G featuring Medina	"Mest ondt"	23 April 2010	1
Nephew featuring Landsholdet	"The Danish Way to Rock"	30 April 2010	1
Stromae	"Alors on danse"	7 May 2010	5
Lena	"Satellite"	11 June 2010	1
Nephew featuring Landsholdet	"The Danish Way to Rock"	18 June 2010	1
Yolanda Be Cool & DCUP	"We No Speak Americano"	25 June 2010	6
Shakira featuring Freshlyground	"Waka Waka (This Time for Africa)"	6 August 2010	1
Eminem featuring Rihanna	"Love the Way You Lie"	13 August 2010	8
Burhan G featuring Nik & Jay	"Tættere på himlen"	8 October 2010	3
Clara Sofie & Rune RK	"Når tiden går baglæns"	29 October 2010	1
Morten Breum featuring Sisse Marie	"Every Time (You Look at Me)"	5 November 2010	1
Clara Sofie & Rune RK	"Når tiden går baglæns"	12 November 2010	5
Medina	"Addiction"	17 December 2010	1
Clemens featuring Jon Nørgaard	"Champion"	24 December 2010	1
Xander	"Det burde ikk være sådan her"	31 December 2010	1

== See also ==
- 2010 in music
