= Velkommen til Medina =

Studio album by Medina
- Released: 31 August 2009
- Genre: Electropop
- Length: 39:22
- Label: At:tack Music
- Producers: Providers, Motrack

Medina chronology
Tæt på (2007)	Velkommen til Medina (2009)	Welcome to Medina (2010)

Singles from Velkommen til Medina
- 1. "Kun for mig" Released: 22 September 2008; 2. "Kun for dig" Released: 6 July 2009; 3. "Velkommen til Medina" Released: 24 July 2009; 4. "Ensom" Released: 2 November 2009; 5. "Vi to" Released: 19 April 2010

Alternative cover
- Special Edition

Professional ratings
Review scores
Source	Rating
AllMusic	3/5 stars
Berlingske Media	5/6 stars
Ekstra Bladet	4/6 stars
Gaffa	3/6 stars
Jyllands-Posten	3/6 stars
Politiken	4/6 stars
Soundvenue	1/6 stars

Velkommen til Medina (Danish for "Welcome to Medina") is the second studio album by the Danish pop singer Medina. It was produced by Providers and Motrack, and released on 31 August 2009 in Denmark.

The lead single of the album, "Kun for mig", was the best selling single of 2009 in Denmark with more than 60,000 units. By January 2010, the single had spent 52 non-consecutive weeks on the Danish Singles Chart, six of them at No. 1. In September 2009, an English version was released with the title "You and I" on Parlophone in the United Kingdom. It reached No. 39 on the UK Singles Chart and No. 27 on the UK Dance Chart. The song was released as the first single from Medina's first international album, Welcome to Medina, in Germany, Austria and Switzerland on 3 May 2010. It charted at No. 9, #25 and No. 30 in the respective countries.

== Track listing ==
No.	Title	Writer(s)	Producer(s)	Length
1.	"Velkommen til Medina"	Medina Valbak, Rasmus Stabell, Jeppe Federspiel	Providers	4:58
2.	"Kun for mig"	Valbak, Stabell, Federspiel	Providers	4:16
3.	"Rick Ross"	Valbak, Christian von Staffeldt	Motrack	3:01
4.	"Stikker du af"	Valbak, Stabell, Federspiel	Providers	3:24
5.	"Ensom"	Valbak, Stabell, Federspiel	Providers	4:12
6.	"Vi to"	Valbak, Stabell, Federspiel	Providers	4:02
7.	"Joanna"	Valbak, von Staffeldt	Motrack	3:30
8.	"Jante"	Valbak, Stabell, Federspiel	Providers	3:32
9.	"Perfektion"	Valbak, von Staffeldt	Motrack	3:19
10.	"Er du med"	Valbak, Stabell, Federspiel	Providers	5:10
Total length:				39:22

=== Special Edition ===
Disc 2
No.	Title	Producer(s)	Length
1.	"Kung for mig" (Akustisk Mix)	Jeppe Federspiel	3:40
2.	"Vi to" (Akustisk Mix)	Jeppe Federspiel	3:55
3.	"Ensom" (Akustisk Mix)	Jeppe Federspiel	4:12
4.	"Kun for mig" (Svenstrup & Vendelboe Remix)		5:02
5.	"Kun for mig" (Rune RK Remix)		6:00
6.	"You & I" (Original Mix)	Providers	4:12
7.	"You & I" (El Bruhn Remix)		4:44
8.	"You & I" (Filur Remix)		5:32
9.	"Kun for dig" (featuring LOC)	Providers, Rune Rask (vocal production)	4:13
10.	"Teri Yaad" (vs. Waqas)	Providers	4:13
11.	"Velkommen til Medina" (Svenstrup & Vendelboe Remix)		5:49
12.	"Velkommen til Medina" (Traplite Remix)		7:09
13.	"Velkommen til Medina" (Massimo & Dominique Remix)		6:32
Total length:			65:44

Additional notes:

- "Kung for mig (Akustisk Mix)", "Vi to (Akustisk Mix)" and "Ensom (Akustisk Mix)": produced by Jeppe Federspiel for Providersmusic
- "Kun for mig (Svenstrup & Vendelboe Remix)" and "You & I (Svenstrup & Vendelboe Remix)": remixed by Kasper Svenstrup and Thomas Vendelboe
- "Kun for mig (Rune RK Remix)": remix and additional production by Rune Reilly Kolsch
- "You & I (Original Mix)": produced by Providers for Soulcamp Entertainment
- "You & I (El Bruhn Remix)": remixed by Lasse Bruhn
- "You & I (Filur Remix)": remixed by Tomas Barfod and Kasper Bjørke
- "Kun for dig (featuring LOC)": produced by Providers for Soulcamp Entertainment, vocal production by Rune Rask, vocal by Liam O'Connor and Medina Valbak
- "Teri Yaad (vs. Waqas)": produced by Providers for Soulcamp Entertainment, vocal by Waqas Qadri
- "Velkommen til Medina (Traplite Remix)": remixed by Nicolas Brañas, Thomas Eke Ochu and Mikæl Gjøl
- "Velkommen til Medina (Massimo & Dominique Remix)": remix and additional production by Mads Jensen, co-produced by Dominik Zawadzki

== Credits and personnel ==
- Written and produced by Providers and Medina for Soulcamp
- Tracks 3, 7, 9: Written and produced by Motrack and Medina
- Vocals: Medina
- Instruments: Rasmus Stabell, Jeppe Federspiel, Christian von Staffeldt
- Mixed and mastered by Anders Schumann, Jeppe Federspiel and Rasmus Stabell in the C4 studio
- Track 10: Mixed and mastered by Mikkel Gemzø, Jeppe Federspiel and Rasmus Stabell in the C4 studio
- Photography and artwork by Sigurd Høyen
- Backstage photography by Rasmus Stabell
- Make-up by Simon Rihana
- Styling by Jesper Hintze and Martin Schultz
- Executive producers: Rasmus Stabell, Jeppe Federspiel, Thomas Børresen
