= Velkommen til Medina (song) =

Single by Medina

from the album Velkommen til Medina
- Released: 24 July 2009
- Recorded: 2008
- Genre: Electropop
- Length: 4:58
- Label: At:tack Music
- Songwriters: Medina Valbak; Jeppe Federspiel and Rasmus Stabell (Providers)
- Producer: Providers

Medina singles chronology
"Kun for mig" (2008)	"Velkommen til Medina" (2009)	"100 dage" (2009)

"Velkommen til Medina" is a Danish song by singer Medina, the second big single taken from the album Velkommen til Medina after the big success of her single "Kun for dig" taken from the same album.

The single was released on 24 July 2009 and topped the Danish Singles Chart for 5 weeks spending a total of 25 weeks on the Danish charts.

== Track list ==
- Single
1. "Velkommen til Medina" (Radio Edit)– 3:40
- Remixes
1. "Velkommen til Medina" – 4:58
2. "Velkommen til Medina" (Traplite Remix) – 7:10
3. "Velkommen til Medina" (Svenstrup & Vendelboe Remix) – 5:50
4. "Velkommen til Medina" (Funkstar Deluxe Remix) – 7:17
5. "Velkommen til Medina" (Anders K Remix) – 6:34
6. "Velkommen til Medina" (Massimo & Domz Remix) – 6:36

== Versions ==
An English language version entitled "Welcome to Medina" appears on her internationally released album Welcome to Medina.

== Charts ==
Charts	Peak position
Denmark (Tracklisten)	1

=== Certification ===
Country	Certification	Sold Copies
Denmark	Platinum	15,000+

=== Year-end Charts ===
Country	Position
Denmark	10
