= Vi to =

Single by Medina

from the album Velkommen til Medina
- Released: 19 April 2010
- Recorded: 2010
- Genre: Dance
- Length: 4:01
- Label: Labelmade / At:tack
- Songwriter(s): Medina Valbak, Rasmus Stabell, Jeppe Federspiel
- Producer(s): Providers

Medina singles chronology
"Ensom" (2009)	"Vi to" (2010)	"Mest ondt" (2010)

Vi to is a song by Danish singer Medina from her second studio album Velkommen til Medina. It was released as the fourth single from the album on 19 April 2010. The song was written by Medina, Rasmus Stabell and Jeppe Federspiel and was produced by Providers. "Vi to" peaked at number two in Denmark.

== Track listing ==
- Danish digital download
1. "Vi to" – 4:01
- Danish iTunes digital download EP
1. "Vi To" (Svenstrup & Vendelboe Remix) – 4:41

== Charts and certifications ==
=== Charts ===
Chart (2010)	Peak position
Denmark (Tracklisten)	2

=== Certifications ===
Country	Certification
Denmark	2× Platinum

== Release history ==
Region	Date	Format	Label
Denmark	19 April 2010	Digital download	Labelmade / At:tack
