= Ensom (song) =

Single by Medina

from the album Velkommen til Medina
- Released: 2 November 2009
- Recorded: 2009
- Genre: Dance
- Length: 3:25
- Label: Labelmade / At:tack
- Songwriter(s): Medina Valbak, Rasmus Stabell, Jeppe Federspiel
- Producer(s): Providers

Medina singles chronology
| "You and I" (2010) | "Ensom" (2009) | "Vi to" (2010) |

Ensom is a song by Danish singer Medina from her second studio album Velkommen til Medina. It was released as the third single from the album on 2 November 2009. The song was written by Medina, Rasmus Stabell and Jeppe Federspiel and was produced by Providers. "Ensom" peaked at number two in Denmark.

== Track listing ==
- Danish digital download
1. "Ensom" (Radio Edit) – 3:25
- Danish iTunes digital download EP
1. "Ensom" (Radio Edit) – 3:25
2. "Ensom" (Svenstrup & Vendelboe Remix) – 4:47
3. "Ensom" (Ronen Dahan Remix) – 4:15
4. "Ensom" (Jay Adams Remix) – 7:03
5. "Ensom" – 4:11
6. "Ensom" (Akustisk Mix) – 4:14

== Charts and certifications ==
=== Charts ===
| Chart (2009) | Peak position |
|---|---|
| Denmark (Tracklisten) | 2 |

=== Certifications ===
| Region | Certification | Certified units/sales |
|---|---|---|
| Denmark (IFPI Danmark) | Platinum | 30,000^{^} |
^{^} Shipments figures based on certification alone.

== Release history ==
| Region | Date | Format | Label |
|---|---|---|---|
| Denmark | 2 November 2009 | Digital download | Labelmade / At:tack |
