= X Factor (Danish TV series) season 15 =

X Factor
- Season 15
- Hosted by: Sofie Linde Ingversen
- Judges: Thomas Blachman; Kwamie Liv; Martin Jensen
- Winner: Mads Moldt
- Winning mentor: Thomas Blachman
- Runner-up: Kári Fossdalsá

Release
- Original network: TV2
- Original release: January 1 – April 8, 2022

Season chronology
- ← Previous; Season 14 Next → Season 16

X Factor is a Danish television music competition showcasing new singing talent. Thomas Blachman and Martin Jensen returned as judges while Oh Land quit, with Kwamie Liv becoming her replacement and Sofie Linde returned as the host.

For the first time on the Danish X Factor, all groups were eliminated in the first 3 live shows.

== Judges and hosts ==
Thomas Blachman and Martin Jensen returned as judges while Oh Land decided to quit as a judge and Kwamie Liv became the new judge Sofie Linde returned as the main host.

== Changes ==
For the first time on the Danish X Factor, no categories were given to the judges. Instead, they mentored one act from each category, one from the 15 to 22s, one from the Over 23s, and one group in the live shows.

== Selection process ==
Auditions took place in Copenhagen and Aarhus.

The 18 successful acts were:

- Thomas Blachman: Emma & Filip, Mads Moldt, Maria Ranum, Lasse Skriver, Meseret Tesfamichael, Wela & Garcia
- Kwamie Liv: 2 Harmonies, Oliver Antonio, Rune Duch, Mathias Julin, Lorenzo & Charlo, Tina Mellemgaard
- Martin Jensen: Mille Bergholtz, Kári Fossdalsá, Lotte Røntved Knudsen, Oscar, RoxorLoops & Jasmin, Sofie Thomsen

=== Bootcamp ===
The 9 eliminated acts were:

- Thomas Blachman: Emma & Filip, Lasse Skriver, Meseret Tesfamichael
- Kwamie Liv: 2 Harmonies, Rune Duch, Mathias Julin
- Martin Jensen: Lotte Røntved Knudsen, RoxorLoops & Jasmin, Sofie Thomsen

== Contestants ==
Key:

– Winner
– Runner-up

Act	Age(s)	Hometown	Mentor	Category	Result
Mads Moldt	16	Frederikshavn	Thomas Blachman	15-22s	Winner
Kári Fossdalsá	25	Aalborg	Martin Jensen	Over 23s	Runner-up
Tina Mellemgaard	18	Hoyvik, Faroe Islands	Kwamie Liv	15-22s	3rd Place
Mille Bergholtz	21	Falster	Martin Jensen	15-22s	4th Place
Maria Ranum	31	Copenhagen	Thomas Blachman	Over 23s	5th Place
Oliver Antonio	23	Birkerød	Kwamie Liv	Over 23s	6th Place
Lorenzo & Charlo	18-20	Ikast	Kwamie Liv	Groups	7th Place
Wela & Garcia	18-19	Valby	Thomas Blachman	Groups	8th Place
Oscar	17-18	Trige	Martin Jensen	Groups	9th Place

== Live shows ==
Colour key

–	Contestant was in the bottom two and had to sing again in the Sing-Off
–	Contestant received the fewest public votes and was immediately eliminated (no Sing-Off)
–	Contestant received the most public votes

Contestants' colour key:

– Kwamie Liv's Contestants
– Thomas Blachmans's Contestants
– Martin Jensen's Contestants

Contestant	Week 1	Week 2	Week 3	Week 4	Week 5	Week 6	Week 7	
Contestant	Week 1	Week 2	Week 3	Week 4	Week 5	Week 6	1st round	2nd round
Mads Moldt	1st 18,6%	1st 18,0%	1st 21,2%	1st 25,0%	2nd 22,80%	1st 32,8%	1st 51,3%	Winner; 59,9%
Kári Fossdalsá	9th 7,6%	6th 10,3%	6th 13,68%	3rd 16,51%	3rd 21,7%	3rd 21,7%	2nd 28,9%	Runner-up; 40,1%
Tina Mellemgaard	2nd 15,9%	3rd 14,9%	3rd 14,2%	5th 14,2%	1st 22,82%	2nd 25,5%	3rd 19,9%	Eliminated (Week 7)
Mille Bergholtz	4th 11,3%	2nd 17,3%	2nd 15,6%	4th 15,0%	4th 18,1%	4th 19,7%	Eliminated (Week 6)	
Maria Ranum	5th 11,1%	5th 11,3%	4th 13,73%	2nd 16,52%	5th 14,6%	Eliminated (Week 5)		
Oliver Antonio	7th 8,0%	4th 13,4%	5th 13,70%	6th 12,8%	Eliminated (Week 4)			
Lorenzo & Charlo	3rd 11,7%	8th 5,4%	7th 7,9%	Eliminated (Week 3)				
Wela & Garcia	6th 8,3%	7th 8,8%	Eliminated (Week 2)					
Oscar	8th 7,9%	Eliminated (Week 1)						
Sing-Off	Oscar, Kári Fossdalsá	Wela & Garcia, Lorenzo & Charlo	Lorenzo & Charlo, Kári Fossdalsá	Oliver Antonio, Tina Mellemgaard	Maria Ranum, Mille Bergholtz	The act that received the fewest public votes was automatically eliminated.		
Blachman voted out	Oscar	Lorenzo & Charlo	Lorenzo & Charlo	Oliver Antonio	Mille Bergholtz	The act that received the fewest public votes was automatically eliminated.		
Liv voted out	Kári Fossdalsá	Wela & Garcia	Kári Fossdalsá	Oliver Antonio	Maria Ranum	The act that received the fewest public votes was automatically eliminated.		
Jensen voted out	Oscar	Wela & Garcia	Lorenzo & Charlo	Tina Mellemgaard	Maria Ranum	The act that received the fewest public votes was automatically eliminated.		
Eliminated	Oscar; 9th	Wela & Garcia; 8th	Lorenzo & Charlo; 7th	Oliver Antonio; 6th	Maria Ranum; 5th	Mille Bergholtz; 4th	Tina Mellemgaard; 3rd	Kári Fossdalsá; Runner-Up
Eliminated	Oscar; 9th	Wela & Garcia; 8th	Lorenzo & Charlo; 7th	Oliver Antonio; 6th	Maria Ranum; 5th	Mille Bergholtz; 4th	Tina Mellemgaard; 3rd	Mads Moldt; Winner

=== Week 1 (February 26) ===
- Theme: Signature

Contestants' performances on the first live show
Act	Order	Song	Result
Oscar	1	"Fucking Smuk"	Bottom two
Oliver Antonio	2	"Watermelon Sugar"	Safe
Mads Moldt	3	"When I R.I.P"	Safe
Mille Bergholtz	4	"We Don't Have to Take Our Clothes Off"	Safe
Wela & Garcia	5	"Dancing in the Dark"	Safe
Tina Mellemgaard	6	"Street Lights"	Safe
Kári Fossdalsá	7	"Please Don't Go"	Bottom two
Maria Ranum	8	"Oblivion"	Safe
Lorenzo & Charlo	9	"Kig op fra gulvet"	Safe
Sing-Off details
Oscar	1	"I morgen er der også en dag"	Eliminated
Kári Fossdalsá	2	"Thinking Out Loud"	Saved

Judges' votes to eliminate

- Blachman: Oscar
- Liv: Kári Fossdalsá
- Jensen: Oscar

=== Week 2 (March 4) ===
- Theme: 200th Program anniversary
- Musical Guest: Saveus ("Dark Vibrations")

Contestants' performances on the second live show
Act	Order	Song	Sung before by	Result
Tina Mellemgaard	1	"If I Ain't Got You"	Laura (Season 1)	Safe
Wela & Garcia	2	"Time to Pretend"	Anthony Jasmin (Season 7)	Bottom two
Kári Fossdalsá	3	"Let Her Go"	Chresten (Season 6)	Safe
Maria Ranum	4	"Waiting Game"	Chili (Season 10)	Safe
Lorenzo & Charlo	5	"Efter Festen"	Mohamed (Season 2)	Bottom two
Mads Moldt	6	"1 Thing"	Mohamed (Season 2)	Safe
Oliver Antonio	7	"My Body Is a Cage"	Nicoline Simone & Jean Michel (Season 5)	Safe
Mille Bergholtz	8	"Stay"	Reem (Season 9)	Safe
Sing-Off details
Wela & Garcia	1	"Somebody Else"		Eliminated
Lorenzo & Charlo	2	"Jeg vil ha' dig for mig selv"		Saved

Judges' votes to eliminate

- Blachman: Lorenzo & Charlo
- Liv: Wela & Garcia
- Jensen: Wela & Garcia

=== Week 3 (March 11) ===
- Theme: SoMe-Stars (Social Media Stars)
- Musical Guest: Ericka Jane ("Forget Being Sober")

Contestants' performances on the third live show
Act	Order	Song	Result
Mads Moldt	1	"Holy"	Safe
Oliver Antonio	2	"House of Balloons"/"Glass Table Girls"	Safe
Mille Bergholtz	3	"Without Me"	Safe
Lorenzo & Charlo	4	"Industry Baby"	Bottom two
Maria Ranum	5	"Gangsta"	Safe
Kári Fossdalsá	6	"I'm So Tired..."	Bottom two
Tina Mellemgaard	7	"All I Need"	Safe
Sing-Off details
Lorenzo & Charlo	1	"I’m Sorry"	Eliminated
Kári Fossdalsá	2	"I’m Not The Only One"	Saved

Judges' votes to eliminate

- Jensen: Lorenzo & Charlo
- Liv: Kári Fossdalsá
- Blachman: Lorenzo & Charlo

=== Week 4 (March 18) ===
- Theme: TV & Movie Songs

Contestants' performances on the fourth live show
Act	Order	Song	Movie/TV show	Result
Oliver Antonio	1	"Another Way to Die"	Quantum of Solace	Bottom two
Maria Ranum	2	"Atlas"	The Hunger Games: Catching Fire	Safe
Mille Bergholtz	3	"Love Me like You Do"	Fifty Shades of Grey	Safe
Mads Moldt	4	"Wreak Havoc"	Suicide Squad	Safe
Tina Mellemgaard	5	"Same Girl"	Euphoria	Bottom two
Kári Fossdalsá	6	"Rewrite the Stars"	The Greatest Showman	Safe
Sing-Off details
Oliver Antonio	1	"Happier"		Eliminated
Tina Mellemgaard	2	"All I Ask"		Saved

Judges' votes to eliminate

- Blachman: Oliver Antonio
- Jensen: Tina Mellemgaard
- Liv: Oliver Antonio

=== Week 5 (March 25) ===
- Theme: Nordic Artists
- Group Performance: "Noget for nogen"
- Musical Guest: Molly Sandén ("Nån annan nu")

Contestants' performances on the fifth live show
Act	Order	Song	Result
Mille Bergholtz	1	"Such a Boy"	Bottom two
Maria Ranum	2	"The Middle"	Bottom two
Tina Mellemgaard	3	"Ord" (Original Song)	Safe
Kári Fossdalsá	4	"Svag"	Safe
Mads Moldt	5	"Dagdrøm"	Safe
Sing-Off details
Mille Bergholtz	1	"All I Want"	Saved
Maria Ranum	2	"Something To Say"	Eliminated

Judges' votes to eliminate

- Blachman: Mille Bergholtz
- Jensen: Maria Ranum
- Liv: Maria Ranum

=== Week 6: Semi-final (1 April) ===
- Theme: Party & The Day After
- Musical Guest: Solveig Lindelof ("Superficial")

Contestants' performances on the sixth live show
Act	Order	First song (Party Song)	Order	Second song (The Day After Song)	Result
Kári Fossdalsá	1	"Get Lucky"	5	"Dancing On My Own"	Safe
Mads Moldt	2	"SexyBack"	6	"Super Rich Kids"	Safe
Tina Mellemgaard	3	"Åben" (Original Song)	7	"I'll Never Love Again"	Safe
Mille Bergholtz	4	"Remember"	8	"Drunk in the Morning"	Eliminated

The semi-final did not feature a sing-off and instead the act with the fewest public votes, Mille Bergholtz was automacally eliminated

=== Week 7: Final (April 8) ===
- Theme: Judges Choice, Duet with a Special Guest, Winner Song
- Musical Guests: Brandon Beal & Lukas Graham together with the 3 finalists Tina, Kári & Mads Moldt ("Higher"), Dean Lewis "Hurtless"
- Group Performance: Cover Me in Sunshine" (P!nk performed by the 9 Finalists) "Half A Man"/"Be Alright" (Dean Lewis performed by Dean Lewis & The Auditionees)

Contestants' performances on the seventh live show
Act	Order	Judges Choice Song	Order	Duet song (with a Special Guest)	Result	Order	Winner Song	Result
Tina Mellemgaard	1	"Love On Top"	4	"Du er" & "Den jeg elsker, elsker jeg" with (Søs Fenger)	Eliminated	N/A (Already Eliminated)		3rd Place
Kári Fossdalsá	2	"Happy"	5	"Daughter of Jonah" & "House on Fire" with (Jonah Blacksmith)	Safe	8	"Believer"	Runner-up
Mads Moldt	3	"See You Again"	6	"Føler mig selv 100" & "Hjem fra Fabrikken" with (Andreas Odbjerg)	Safe	7	"Clingy"	Winner
