= You and I (Medina song) =

Single by Medina

from the album Welcome to Medina
- Released: 21 September 2009
- Recorded: 2009
- Genre: Electropop
- Length: 3:12
- Label: Parlophone
- Songwriters: Medina Valbak, Rasmus Stabell, Jeppe Federspiel, Adam Powers, Julie Steincke
- Producer: Providers

Medina singles chronology
"100 dage" (2009)	"You and I" (2009)	"Ensom" (2009)

"You and I" is a song by Danish electropop singer Medina. It was released in the United Kingdom on 21 September 2009 and in Germany, Austria and Switzerland on 3 May 2010. The song is an English version of the Danish song, "Kun for mig", released in late 2008 in Denmark, where it spent 52 weeks on the singles chart; six weeks at number one. Originally written by Medina, Jeppe Federspiel and Rasmus Stabell it was translated into English by Adam Powers and Julie Steincke, and released as Medina's debut single from her international studio album, Welcome to Medina.

"You and I" peaked at number thirty-nine in the UK, and at number six in the United States on Billboard's Hot Dance Airplay chart. It reached number three in Bulgaria and number ten in Germany (where it was also certified Gold) and Russia. The song also charted in Austria, Switzerland and Sweden.

== Critical reception ==
David Balls of entertainment website Digital Spy gave the song four out of five stars writing, "With its wistful chorus and cool-but-insistent beats, it's an affecting slice of break-up disco given a frisson of distinction by some authentically Chilean pan pipe flourishes [...] this has all the right ingredients to become a very big hit." Fraser McAlpine of BBC Chart Blog gave the song a positive review stating, "There's some standard synthing in the background, which creates a lovely air of isolation, with Medina's haunting vocals on the top telling the story of a love gone wrong. [...] it's perhaps not groundbreaking in any big way, since you've probably heard a variation on the general theme of this song millions of times before, but this one is well-crafted enough to be counted among the better examples."

== Live performances ==
Medina performed the song on the Greece version of X Factor on 12 February 2010. On 20 May 2010 she performed "You and I" on the 54th episode of the German television music show The Dome in Stuttgart. It was broadcast on 30 May 2010 on RTL II.

== Track listing ==
- UK / US digital download
1. "You and I" (Radio Edit) – 3:12
2. "You and I" (Deadmau5 Remix) – 6:19
3. "You and I" (Dash Berlin Vocal Remix)– 4:05
4. "You and I" (Spencer and Hill Remix) – 6:21
5. "You and I" (Svenstrup and Vendelboe Remix) – 5:06
6. "You and I" (Original Mix) – 4:15
- UK promo CD single #1
1. "You and I" (Radio Edit) – 3:11
2. "You and I" (Original Mix) – 4:16
3. "You and I" (Instrumental) – 4:17
- UK promo CD single #2
1. "You and I" (Original) – 6:29
2. "You and I" (Deadmau5 Remix) – 6:17
3. "You and I" (Dash Berlin Vocal Remix) – 9:38
4. "You and I" (Spencer & Hill) – 6:19
5. "You and I" (Kim Fai Magic Hotdog Dub Remix) – 7:35
6. "You and I" (Havin Zagross & Luciano Remix) – 7:04
7. "You and I" (Svenstrup & Venedelboe Remix) – 5:04
8. "You and I" (Original Edit) – 4:15
- German digital download
1. "You and I" (Radio Edit) – 3:10
2. "You and I" (Svenstrup and Vendelboe Remix) – 5:03
3. "You and I" (The Gooseflesh Remix) – 5:11
4. "You and I" (Get Busy Boys Remix) – 4:11
5. "You and I" (Beam vs. Jay Frog Remix) – 5:07
6. "You and I" (Massimo Nocito Remix) – 5:08
- German CD single
1. "You and I" (Radio Edit) – 3:11
2. "You and I" (Svenstrup & Vendelboe Rmx) – 5:04

== Personnel ==
- Songwriting – Medina Valbak, Rasmus Stabell, Jeppe Federspiel, Adam Powers, Julie Steincke
- Production and instruments – Providers
- Vocals – Medina
- Mixing and mastering – Anders Schuman, Providers

== Charts ==
=== Weekly charts ===
Chart (2009–2010)	Peak position
Austria (Ö3 Austria Top 40)	25
Bulgaria (IFPI)	3
CIS Airplay (TopHit)	10
Denmark (Tracklisten)	23
Germany (GfK)	10
Latvia (European Hit Radio)	9
Russia Airplay (TopHit)	10
Sweden (Sverigetopplistan)	42
Switzerland (Schweizer Hitparade)	30
UK Dance (OCC)	27
UK Singles (OCC)	39
US Hot Dance Airplay (Billboard)	6

=== Year-end charts ===
Chart (2009)	Position
Russia Airplay (TopHit)	160

Chart (2010)	Position
CIS (TopHit)	57
Germany (Media Control AG)	52
Russia Airplay (TopHit)	44

== Certifications ==
Region	Certification	Certified units/sales
Germany (BVMI)	Gold	150,000^{^}
^{^} Shipments figures based on certification alone.

== Release history ==
Region	Date	Label	Format
United Kingdom	21 September 2009	Parlophone	Digital download
United Kingdom	12 October 2009	Parlophone	CD single
United States	11 October 2009	EMI	Digital download
Germany; Austria; Switzerland	3 May 2010	EMI	Digital download
Germany; Austria; Switzerland	30 April 2010	EMI	CD single
