= 100 dage =

Single by Thomas Helmig featuring Medina

from the album Tommy Boy
- Released: 18 September 2009
- Recorded: 2009
- Genre: Pop
- Length: 4:16
- Label: Genlyd / Sony Music Entertainment
- Songwriter(s): Thomas Helmig

Thomas Helmig singles chronology
"Op Og Ned" (2006)	"100 dage" (2009)

Medina singles chronology
"Velkommen til Medina" (2009)	"100 dage" (2009)	"You and I" (2009)

100 dage is a song by Danish rock singer Thomas Helmig from his sixteenth studio album Tommy Boy, featuring vocals from Danish pop singer Medina. It was released on 18 September 2009. "100 dage" peaked at number one in Denmark.

== Track listing ==
- Danish digital download
1. "100 Dage" – 4:16

== Charts ==
Chart (2009)	Peak position
Denmark (Tracklisten)	1

== Release history ==
Region	Date	Format	Label
Denmark	18 September 2009	Digital download	Genlyd / Sony Music Entertainment
