= Din for evigt =

Studio album by Burhan G
- Released: 7 October 2013
- Recorded: 2012–2013
- Label: Copenhagen Records
- Producer: Burhan G, Fridolin Nordsø

Burhan G chronology
| Burhan G (album)#Burhan G Special Edition (2011) | Din for evigt (2013) |

Singles from Din for evigt
- 1. "Din for evigt" Released: 11 March 2013; 2. "Kalder mig hjem" Released: 19 August 2013; 3. "Ikke i nat, ikke endnu" Released: 10 February 2014; 4. "Karma" Released: 19 May 2014

Din for evigt is the fourth studio album of Danish singer Burhan G. The album released on 7 October 2013 reached number one on Tracklisten the official Danish Albums Chart and was certified platinum.

The title track "Din for evigt" was pre-released on 11 March 2013, also being certified platinum.

== Track list ==
- All songs were produced by Burhan G, except for "Karma" jointly produced by Burhan G and Fridolin Nordsø.

Standard edition
| No. | Title | Writer(s) | Length |
|---|---|---|---|
| 1. | "Før byen vågner" | Burhan Genc, Lars Ankerstjerne | 4:19 |
| 2. | "Din for evigt" | Genc, Ankerstjerne | 4:20 |
| 3. | "Kalder mig hjem" | Genc, Ankerstjerne | 3:33 |
| 4. | "Kærlighed & krig" (featuring Caroline Franceska) | Genc, Ankerstjerne | 5:03 |
| 5. | "Ikke i nat, ikke endnu" | Genc, Ankerstjerne | 4:00 |
| 6. | "Karma" (featuring L.O.C.) | Genc, Ankerstjerne, Liam O'Connor, Fridolin Nordsø | 3:09 |
| 7. | "Et bedre sted" | Genc, Ankerstjerne | 4:07 |
| 8. | "Verden drejer" (featuring Shaka Loveless) | Genc, Ankerstjerne, Shaka Loveless | 3:44 |
| 9. | "Tænk på mig" | Genc, Ankerstjerne | 4:57 |
| 10. | "Lever for dig" | Genc, Ankerstjerne | 4:25 |

== Chart performance ==
=== Weekly charts ===
| Chart (2013) | Peak position |
|---|---|
| Danish Albums (Hitlisten) | 1 |

=== Year-end charts ===
| Hitliste (2013) | Placing |
|---|---|
| Denmark | 7 |

== Certification ==
| Land (Organisation) | Certification |
|---|---|
| Denmark (IFPI) | Platin |
