= Telephone (song) =

2010 single by Lady Gaga featuring Beyoncé

Single by Lady Gaga featuring Beyoncé

from the EP The Fame Monster
- B-side: "Telephone" (Passion Pit Remix)
- Released: January 26, 2010
- Recorded: 2009
- Studio: Darkchild (Los Angeles); Groove (Osaka, Japan)
- Genre: Dance-pop
- Length: 3:41
- Label: Streamline; KonLive; Cherrytree; Interscope
- Songwriters: Lady Gaga; Rodney Jerkins; LaShawn Daniels; Lazonate Franklin; Beyoncé
- Producer: Rodney "Darkchild" Jerkins

Lady Gaga singles chronology
| "Video Phone" (2009) | "Telephone" (2010) | "Alejandro" (2010) |

Beyoncé singles chronology
| "Put It in a Love Song" (2010) | "Telephone" (2010) | "Why Don't You Love Me" (2010) |

Music video
- "Telephone" on YouTube

"Telephone" is a song by American singer Lady Gaga from her third extended play (EP), The Fame Monster (2009)—the reissue of her debut studio album, The Fame (2008). Featuring American singer Beyoncé, it was released as the EP's second single on January 26, 2010. Gaga and Beyoncé wrote "Telephone" with Rodney Jerkins, LaShawn Daniels, and Lazonate Franklin. Jerkins was responsible for the production, with Gaga co-producing with him. Gaga originally wrote the song for Britney Spears, who recorded a demo. "Telephone" conveys Gaga's fear of not finding time for fun given the increasing pressure for her to work harder as an artist. Musically, the song consists of an expanded bridge, verse-rap, and a sampled voice of an operator announcing that the phone line is unreachable. Beyoncé appears in the middle of the song, singing the verses in a "rapid-fire" way and accompanied by double beats.

"Telephone" received positive reviews from critics who called it a stand-out track from The Fame Monster and praised Gaga's chemistry with Beyoncé. Several critics included it in their best-of list of 2010. It was nominated for a Grammy Award for Best Pop Collaboration with Vocals, and it won a ASCAP Pop Music Award and a BMI Award. Following the album's release, the song charted in many countries, including Australia, Canada, the Netherlands, New Zealand, Sweden, and Hungary. Peaking at number three in the US, it was particularly successful in Europe where it topped the charts in Belgium, Croatia, Denmark, Ireland, Norway, and the UK. The song sold 7.4 million digital copies worldwide in 2010, making it the year's fourth-best-selling single.

The accompanying music video for "Telephone", shot as a short film, was filmed in an intense two-day shoot across multiple locations, with minimalist lighting and meticulous planning, allowing 150 setups per day to be captured. It is a continuation of the video for "Paparazzi" (2009), the fifth single from The Fame. It follows Beyoncé as she bails Gaga out of prison for killing her boyfriend; they go to a diner and poison the customers' breakfast. The video ends as they attempt to escape a high-speed police chase. It references Quentin Tarantino and his films Pulp Fiction (1994) and Kill Bill: Volume 1 (2003). The video received generally positive reviews and was nominated for three awards at the 2010 MTV Video Music Awards, including Video of the Year. In January 2015, Billboard named it the best video of the first half of the decade. NME listed it as one of the 100 greatest music videos of all time. Retrospective reviewers analyzed the video's themes, including feminism, lesbianism, and commentary on fame and celebrity culture.

In memory of fashion designer and friend Alexander McQueen, Gaga performed an acoustic rendition of "Telephone" at the 2010 BRIT Awards. She also sang it during the Super Bowl LI halftime show, and many of her concert tours and other live appearances. The song was covered by several artists, as well as characters from the television show Glee.

== Background and release ==
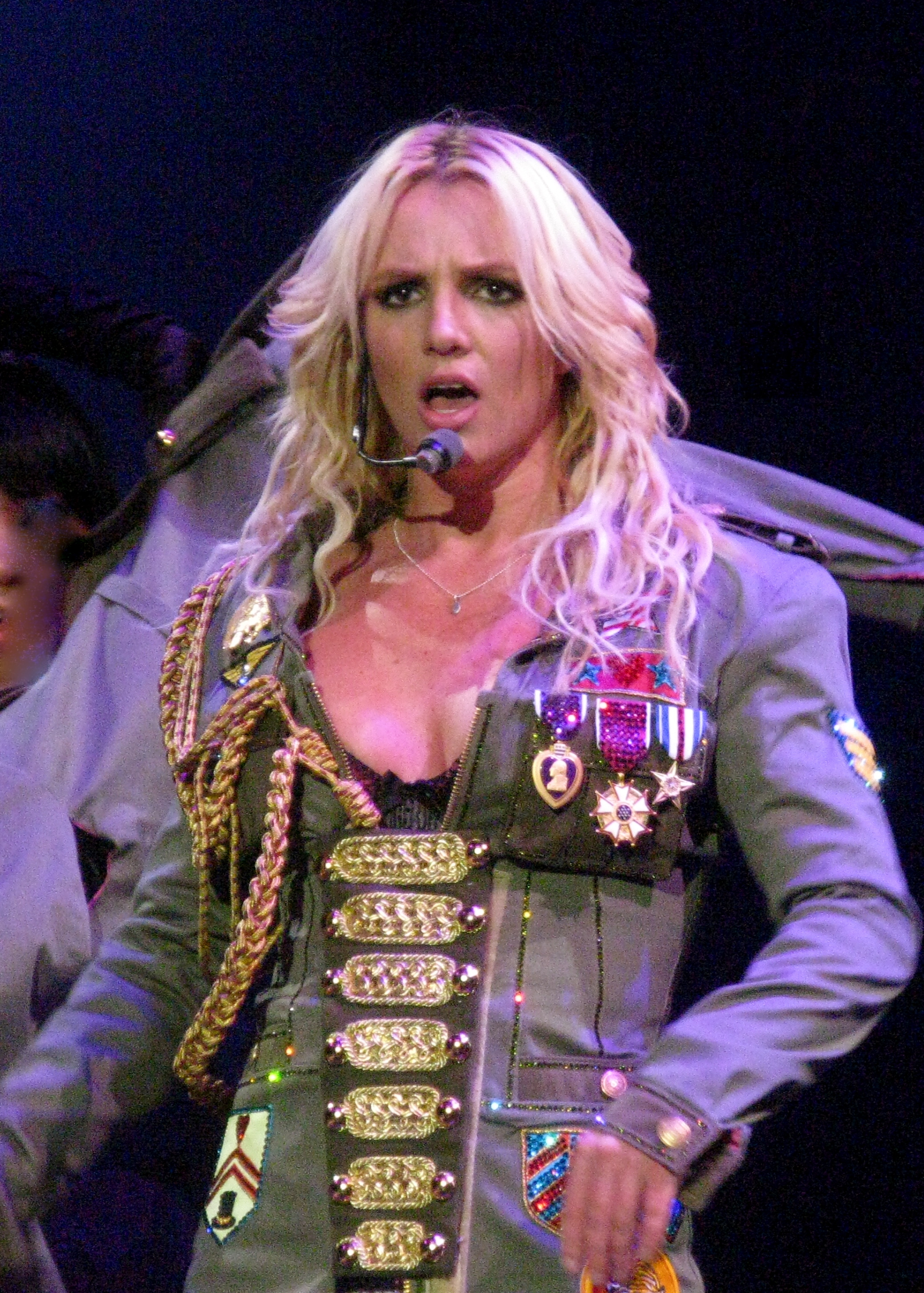
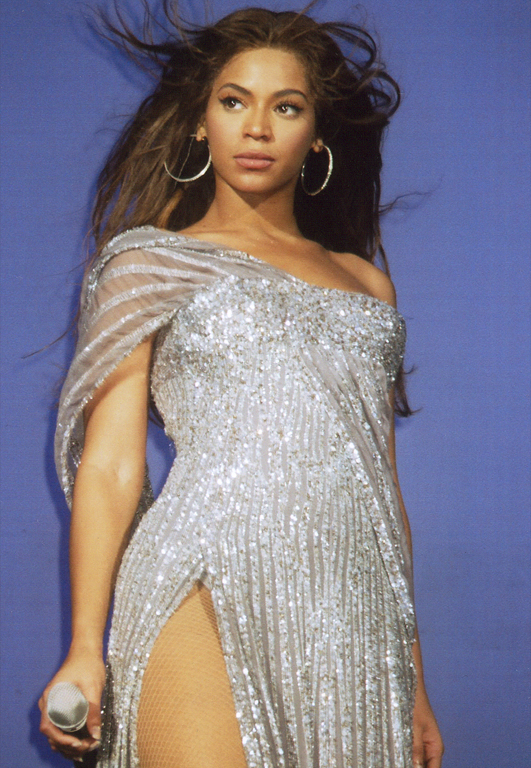
"Telephone" was initially written for Britney Spears (left, pictured in 2009). When she did not use it for her album, Gaga took the song and recorded it as a duet with Beyoncé (right, pictured in 2007).

Lady Gaga originally wrote "Telephone" for Circus (2008), singer Britney Spears's sixth studio album, yet Spears rejected it. Taking the song for herself, Gaga wanted Spears to be its guest vocalist though Beyoncé became the final choice. Gaga recorded "Telephone" with her for the extended play (EP) The Fame Monster (2009)—the reissue of her debut studio album, The Fame (2008). It was released as the EP's second single on January 26, 2010. The two previously collaborated on a remix of Beyoncé's "Video Phone" (2009).

The song was mainly inspired by Gaga's fear of not finding the time to have fun. She described it as a feeling of "suffocation—something that I have or fear is never being able to enjoy myself, [...] 'Cause I love my work so much, I find it really hard to go out and have a good time. [...] I don't go to nightclubs, [...] You don't see pictures of me falling out of a club drunk. I don't go—and that's because I usually go and then, you know, a whiskey and a half into it, I got to get back to work."

In May 2011, Gaga said her "emotional connection" with "Telephone" was difficult. When asked if it was because the song was originally written for Spears, she answered: "Well that's not exactly what happened, but I don't want to delve into that. I could delve into it if you turn [the recorder] off [...] But ultimately the mix and the process of getting the production finished was very stressful for me. So when I say it's my worst song it has nothing to do with the song, just my emotional connection to it."

== Music and lyrics ==
Gaga wrote "Telephone" with Rodney Jerkins, LaShawn Daniels, Lazonate Franklin, and Beyoncé. Jerkins served as the main producer, with Gaga co-producing with him. With Matty Green's assistance, the song was mixed at Chalice Recording Studios (Los Angeles, California) by Jerkins and Spike Stent. For the recording, Paul Foley was hired. Gene Grimaldi, Larry Ryckman, and Ari Blitz did the song's mastering at Oasis Mastering (Burbank, California), AfterMaster Recording, and Mastering Studios (Los Angeles). Mike "Handz" Donaldson recorded Gaga's vocals at Darkchild Studios (Los Angeles), and Hisashi Mizoguchi did Beyoncé's at Studio Groove (Osaka, Japan). Takayuki Matsushima assisted the latter recording. Special effects and additional vocal production were handled by Donaldson.

A dance-pop song, "Telephone" starts slowly as Gaga sings in a solemn voice over a harp melody, which changes immediately to a pounding beat. Beyoncé delivers her verse in a "rapid-fire" way accompanied by double beats. She sings her lyrics through a brief interlude and later backs the chorus during the rest of the song. "Telephone" consists of an expanded bridge, a verse-rap and an epilogue where a voice announces that the telephone line is unreachable at that moment.

The lyrics express Gaga's preference for dancing in the club to answering her boyfriend's persistent calls. Mikael Wood from the Los Angeles Times felt that the song is a meticulous reflection on this frustrating experience. Gaga describes the feeling as leaving "her head and her heart on the dance floor". According to Gaga, the phone addressed in the lyrics is not just a physical phone but also a person in her head telling her to keep working harder. "That's my fear—that the phone's ringing and my head's ringing, [...] Whether it's a telephone or it's just the thoughts in your head, that's another fear."

Exploring the history of telephone songs and their relationship with female empowerment in popular music, Lisa Colton, professor of musicology, saw "Telephone" as a modern interpretation of the relationship between technology, gender, and power. She argued that the telephone has been a popular subject in many songs due to its social history and function that are closely associated with issues such as gender equality. For example, in the past, women's roles were limited to that of operators or low-status employees, and the telephone was a source of controversy as some men worried it gave women more independence and opportunities for romantic engagements.

In his book Gaga Feminism: Sex, Gender, and the End of Normal, J. Jack Halberstam suggested that "Telephone" is not just a simple pop song but a deeper commentary on the role of technology in human lives, media manipulation, and the emergence of new forms of gender and sexuality in the digital age. The song explores the darker side of stalking, exemplified by the line "stop calling, stop calling". Halberstam wrote that Gaga and Beyoncé use the metaphor of the telephone to comment on the influence of technology on modern relationships, suggesting that heterosexuality may be becoming an outdated concept.

== Critical reception ==
The song garnered positive reviews from music critics. Nicki Escuerdo from Phoenix New Times, Michael Hubbard from MusicOMH and Evan Sawdey from PopMatters deemed it an album highlight. Many journalists centered their praise towards the song's structure and production. This includes Sawdey, who wrote that because of the rapid-fire beat and energetic verses, "Telephone" delivered an adrenaline-fueled experience. Popjustice had similar sentiments, writing: "It's a little bit like Gwen's 'What You Waiting For?' meets Timbaland's 'The Way I Are' meets about fifty other things [...] The structure's quite exciting". Hubbard praised Beyoncé's rapping, the bridge and the ending, calling it "maddeningly great".

Gaga's chemistry with Beyoncé was mostly praised; Sawdey and Billboard's Melanie Bertoldi wrote that the song's quality was enhanced due to this chemistry. Bertoldi found that it creates an atmosphere catchy enough to elicit some dancing from the listener. For Adam White of The Independent, "Telephone" showcased the duo at their "most basic", but deliberately so, as it was crafted for "nightclub frivolity", epitomizing the essence of "trash-pop, a noisy and glitchy slab of energy and dial tones resting entirely on their shared charisma". Billboard's Jason Lipshutz named the song Gaga's second best collaboration and called it her "most dynamic duet — and arguably the most compelling pop star team-up of the '00s". On the contrary, Sarah Hajibagheri from The Times and Brian Linder of IGN disliked Beyoncé's part; the former believed that her inclusion negatively added to the song's feeling of complete disorder. Armond White from the New York Press also expressed disappointment, writing that the song "celebrates a heedless refusal to communicate; to mindlessly, heartlessly indulge pop culture—Tarantino style".

In an early review, Yahoo! Music's Chris Willman compared "Telephone" with the duo's other collaborative song, "Video Phone", and wrote: "Maybe it's because the lack of a video for Gaga's 'Telephone' leaves more to the imagination, but if this were a contest, I'd have to say her tune trumps Beyonce's. It's not just that Jerkins has come up with such a feisty track, but that Gaga has the [atti]tude to go with it."

Several media outlets ranked "Telephone" as one of Gaga's best songs. (Note: The Guardian, Rolling Stone, The Independent, Billboard, Vulture and Uproxx) Calling it "a shuttering electro-pop banger", Billboard acknowledged the song as "an ass-kicking piece of empowerment pop during Gaga's most prolonged win streak". Vulture similarly recognized the song's feminist message in that Gaga "does things her way, with no regard for the male gaze or the music industry's gatekeepers". The website further wrote that the song "didn't just elevate Gaga as a pop star — it made her a new American icon".

== Chart performance ==
In November 2009, "Telephone" charted in Ireland, Australia and the UK, debuting at number 26, 29 and 30, respectively. In the US, the song peaked at number three on the Billboard Hot 100 and number one on the Hot Dance Club Songs and the Billboard Pop Songs chart, becoming Gaga's sixth consecutive chart-topper on the lattermost. It also became Beyoncé's sixth number-one on Pop Songs. With this, Gaga and Beyoncé tied with Mariah Carey for most number-ones since the Nielsen BDS-based Top 40 airplay chart launched in 1992. As of early February 2019, "Telephone" has sold 3.5 million digital downloads in the US.

"Telephone" reached number 12 on the UK Singles Chart on March 14, 2010, and climbed to number one the following week. It has sold 1.6 million copies and gained 107 million streams there as of January 2025 and was certified triple platinum by the British Phonographic Industry (BPI), making it Gaga's sixth-best-selling song in the region. According to a 2015 list by the Official Charts Company, "Telephone" was the third-best-selling vinyl single in the UK for the 2010s. The song reached number one in Ireland, number two in Sweden and number three in Hungary.

In Australia and New Zealand, "Telephone" reached a peak of number 3, and it was certified eight times platinum by the Australian Recording Industry Association (ARIA) for shipments of 560,000 copies. "Telephone" debuted at number 14 on the Canadian Hot 100 and peaked at number three, making it Gaga's sixth consecutive top-three single there. The song has been certified triple platinum by the Canadian Recording Industry Association (CRIA) for sales of 240,000 digital downloads.

According to the International Federation of the Phonographic Industry, the song was 2010's fourth-best-selling single, with digital sales of 7.4 million copies that year.

== Music video ==
=== Background and development ===
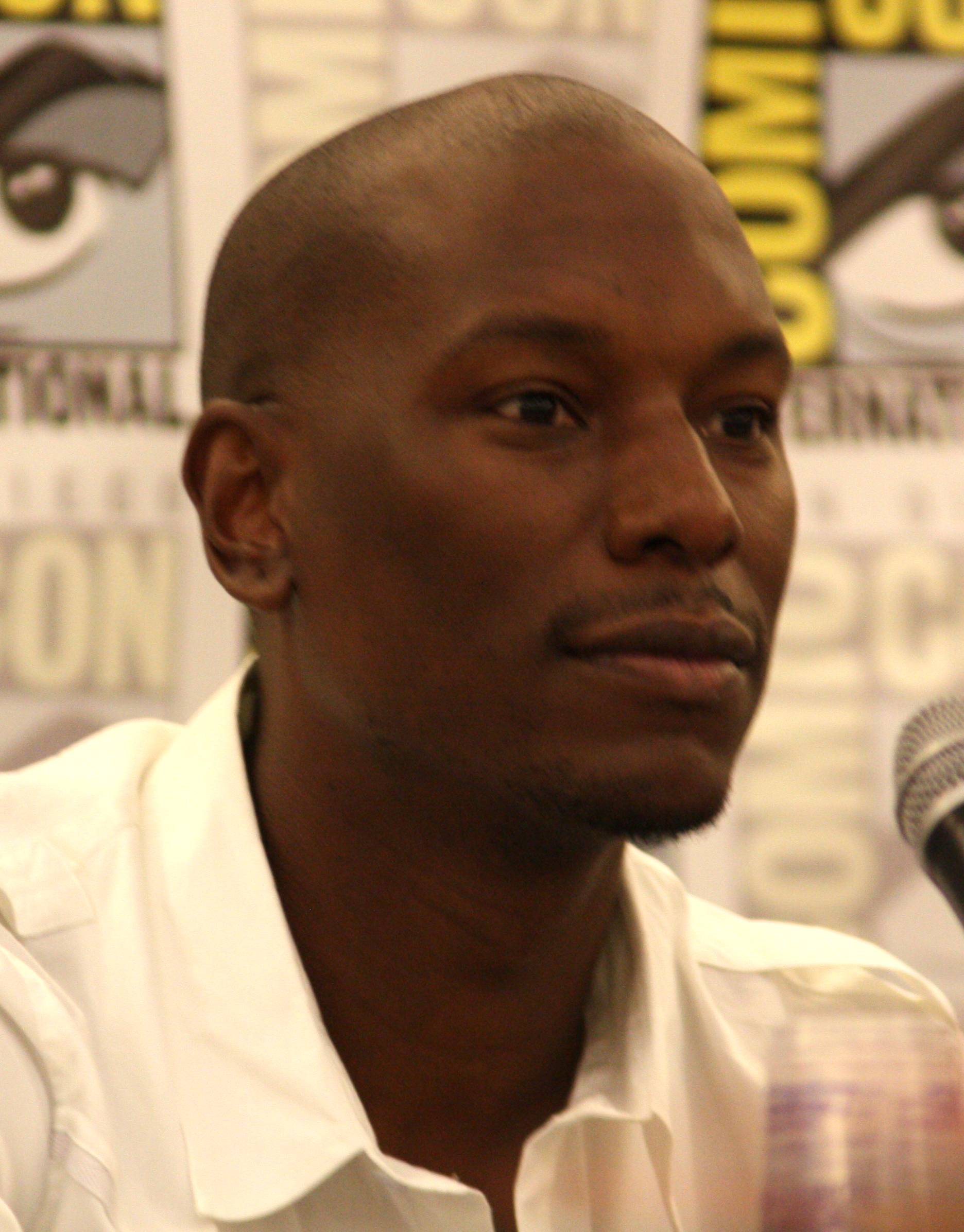
Tyrese Gibson (pictured in 2009) appeared in the music video.

New York magazine reported that the concept of the video involved Beyoncé as she bails Gaga out of jail. In published photos from the set, they were seen shooting in a car called the "Pussy Wagon", which Uma Thurman's character drove in Quentin Tarantino's 2003 film Kill Bill: Volume 1. The two wore "destroyed denim pieces" designed by Frank Fernández and Oscar Olima.

Other concepts of the video involve scenes at a diner and appearances from singer Tyrese Gibson and rock band Semi Precious Weapons. In February 2010, Gaga commented, "What I like about it is it's a real true pop event, and when I was younger, I was always excited when there was a big giant event happening in pop music and that's what I wanted this to be." She explained the deeper meaning of the video to E! Online:

There was this really amazing quality in 'Paparazzi', where it kind of had this pure pop music quality but at the same time it was a commentary on fame culture [...] I wanted to do the same thing with this video [...] There certainly is a Tarantino-inspired quality in the ['Telephone'] video [...] His direct involvement in the video came from him lending me the Pussy Wagon. We were having lunch one day in Los Angeles and I was telling him about my concept for the video and he loved it so much he said, "You gotta use the Pussy Wagon."

On February 15, 2010, Gaga posted three film stills from the music video. They depicted her in three settings: a kitchen where she wears a plastic chef's hat and a telephone hairdo; a diner with her dancers, where she is seen wearing an American flag patterned bikini and bandana; and a black-and-white photo of her in a hat made from multiple triangles and corded telephones. On March 9, more stills of the video were posted online. After a delay, the video premiered on E! News and Vevo on March 11.

=== Filming ===
Because of Gaga's and Beyoncé's busy schedules, director Jonas Åkerlund and cinematographer Pär Ekberg had to finish filming in two days while coordinating multiple locations, dance numbers and extras. They spent most of their preparation time scouting locations and discussing the script and shot lists. To ensure a natural look while properly showcasing the outfits, makeup, props and art details, Ekberg took a minimalistic approach to lighting that involved shooting without a big pre-light and adding a beauty light for the artists. Åkerlund utilized a mixture of hydrargyrum medium-arc iodide lamps (HMI) and fluorescent fixtures to light the prison interiors and the diner scenes that were filmed at The Four Aces Motel in Palmdale, California. He used a Briese beauty light for close-ups and singles. Prison scenes were filmed at Lincoln Heights Jail.

Using three cameras that ran almost constantly, the cinematography team could capture about 150 setups per day. For the kitchen scene, which was shot in a prison storage room, Åkerlund wanted to evoke a "clinical feel" and create "a mix of a kitchen and a laboratory". The majority of the video was filmed on Kodak Vision3 250D 5207, which Åkerlund considered one of his favorite film stocks. During post-production, the team wanted to keep the colors true to the original negative, with minor adjustments for contrast and grain.

=== Synopsis ===
The music video is over nine minutes long and serves as a continuation of "Paparazzi", where Gaga was arrested for killing her abusive boyfriend by poisoning his drink. Inside a women's prison, two guards put Gaga behind bars and strip her naked while several other inmates mock her. One of the guards comments: "I told you she didn't have a dick", referring to the rumors that Gaga is intersex. The video's first three minutes show her activities in the prison. Wearing sunglasses made out of half-smoked cigarettes, she kisses an inmate in the exercise yard and secretly steals her cell phone. Gaga also watches catfights in the commissary, which includes a cameo from her younger sister, Natali Germanotta. Gaga then answers a call from Beyoncé and begins to sing the song. She performs the first verse and chorus with other scantily clothed inmates and messages Beyoncé on the cell phone, thanking her for bailing her out. This is followed by a bridge featuring Gaga in a yellow caution tape outfit designed by Brian Lichtenberg. Other fashion pieces were designed by Thierry Mugler, Atsuko Kudo and Gaga's own creative team, Haus of Gaga; the video was outfitted by Nicola Formichetti.

Gaga gets inside the Pussy Wagon with Beyoncé, Honey Bee, a reference to the character Honey Bunny in Tarantino's film Pulp Fiction (1994). The two briefly talk and travel through the desert to stop at a diner. After exchanging a silent dialogue with Bobo (Gibson), her misogynist boyfriend, Beyoncé poisons his drink but fails to kill him. The video features an intermediate sequence called "Let's Make a Sandwich", where Gaga is seen wearing a folded-up telephone on her head and preparing a sandwich in a kitchen, while dancers cavort behind her. She poisons the food she prepares for the unsuspecting customers, causing them to die, including Bobo, characters played by Semi Precious Weapons and Lava – her Great Dane. Strutting around their corpses, Gaga and Beyoncé dance in American flag-inspired garments and shredded denim. The two make a getaway using the Pussy Wagon as a news reporter reports the murders at the diner. The final shots show the duo travelling through the desert while police sirens wail in the background. The video ends with the line "To Be Continued ..." followed by end credits. Åkerlund put this line as a joke to create a blend of a trailer, short film and movie scene that organically unfolds as it progresses.

=== Reception ===
"Gaga turned this companion piece to 'Paparazzi' into a pop culture event, roping in the Pussy Wagon from Kill Bill and a fancy co-star in Beyoncé. The Thelma and Louise arc has Beyoncé bailing Gaga out of jail to poison a diner full of customers, who look practically sepia-toned next to the bird-in-heat style costumes Beyonce and Gaga shimmy around in. What with its evasive dialogue and the gobs of hype leading up to its release, the video itself feels sort of like an elaborate inside joke we're all supposed to be in on."

— Rolling Stone's Mallika Rao talking about the music video.

Critics quickly hailed the video as "a visual feast", (Note: Matt Donnelly from Los Angeles Times) "a masterpiece of subversive artistry", (Note: Juliet Williams in the Journal of Popular Music Studies) and one that "more than measures up to the hype". (Note: Monica Herrera from Billboard) Amy Phillips from Pitchfork wrote it was "the most fun, most ridiculous, and arguably best music video of the year", and William Goodman of Spin called it a "big-budget, pop masterwork". According to James Montgomery from MTV, "Telephone" helped Gaga's ascent to the upper echelons of pop stardom, alongside others on par with Madonna and Michael Jackson in terms of showmanship. Tanner Stransky from Entertainment Weekly believed it was not on par with the video for Gaga's "Bad Romance"—the lead single from The Fame Monster—but still "better than anything else out there".

Matt Donnelly from the Los Angeles Times and Monica Herrera from Billboard praised the scenes with the fight between inmates; the former approvingly called it a video "packed with [...] poisoned diner food, an army of headpieces and lots of Gaga goodness". Some reviews praised Beyoncé, called "always fierce" by Jennifer Cady of E! and the video's "best part" by Amy Odell from New York. Others focused on the video's fashion and aesthetics. (Note: Donnelly, various fashion experts (including stylist Robert Verdi) and Variety) With "Telephone", Gaga made "much stronger pop-art statements", wrote stylist Robert Verdi. In a 2021 article, Variety named it Gaga's best music video based on its outfits, calling it a "phenomenal fashion feast".

Some reviews commented on the video's feminist themes. J. Jack Halberstam argued that the music video portrays a powerful image of sisterhood that aligns with the intimate bonds seen in movies such as Thelma & Louise (1991) and Set It Off (1996). Interpreting this review, theater theorist Bess Rowen wrote that Gaga's portrayal of women in her work challenges the conventional images of women in society, making her work relevant to modern feminism. Caryn Ganz of Rolling Stone believed it "is certainly cinematic and oddly feminist, and gasps at a larger statement about consumer culture". Ganz called the video a "mash-up of lesbian prison porn, campy sexploitation flicks and insidery winks at the two divas' public personas", noting, "If Quentin Tarantino and Russ Meyer remade Thelma & Louise as an orgy of product placement with fiercely choreographed interludes, this would be the result".

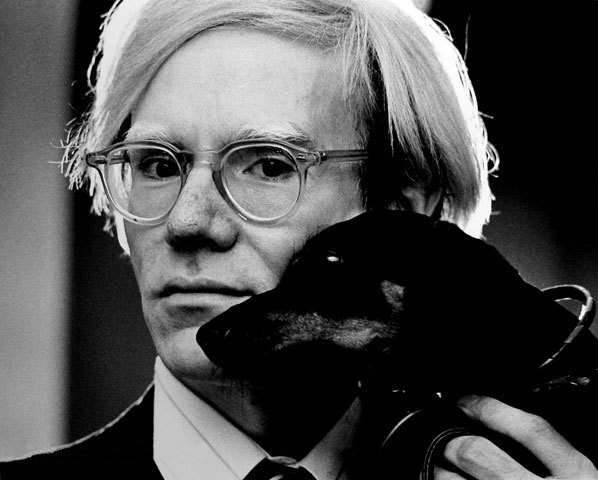
In the video, Gaga used items, which she said some viewers mistook as product placements, but were actually references to Andy Warhol (pictured in 1973), as part of her commentary on American commercialism in technology and information overload.

The video for "Telephone" earned Gaga the Guinness World Record for Most Product Placement in a Video. Talking with NME in 2011, Gaga said the display of these items was not meant to be product placements but references to Andy Warhol as part of a commentary on commercialism in the US regarding technology and information overload. Because of this misunderstanding, she decided to not showcase so many products in her future music videos. The same year, Gaga expressed dissatisfaction with the video in an interview with Time Out. Although Gaga believed she and Beyoncé worked well together, the incorporation of numerous ideas left her "brain throbbing", and she expressed a desire to have edited herself more. In a 2020 piece for The New York Times, Lindsay Zoladz found this self-criticism unfair as she believed the video to be "one of the wildest and most watchable pop artifacts of its era, a defining moment in the music video's migration from MTV to the unruly internet".

Some reviews were less enthusiastic. Labeling the video's narrative incoherent, Alyssa Rosenberg of The Atlantic disliked the use of a women's prison, muscular female prison guards and situational lesbianism. Armond White stated that it "epitomizes the insanity of the contemporary pop mainstream" and pays "homage to Tarantino's influence" in distorting "pop culture pleasure into nonsense". Despite calling the video "thoroughly mediocre", Douglas Haddow of The Guardian believed it was a highly effective advertisement in that Gaga successfully curated visual references and pop culture motifs designed to appeal to a wide range of demographics. He suggested that "Telephone" is indicative of a new era in which "content, celebrity and advertising" are fused together to create a marketable "goo".

=== Analysis ===
José M. Yebra of University of Zaragoza and Aylin Zafar of The Atlantic recognized feminist themes in the video. To start his analysis, Yebra wrote that Gaga is criminalized although she is a victim of domestic abuse. The all-female prison, named "prison for bitches", alludes to Gaga using the word "bitch" to mean female liberty. Her metaphorical freedom there is solidified by scenes where she engages in lesbianism, despite being in chains, and where her song "Paper Gangsta", a track about "girl power", plays. As such, Yebra concluded the prison becomes, ironically, a place free from male abuse. Zafar interpreted the scene with Beyoncé and Gaga eating Honey Buns as a reversal of the objectification of women through food. She saw the scenes featuring Wonder Bread and Miracle Whip as a challenge to the gender stereotype of the "perfect housewife" portrayed heavily in 1950s pop culture. According to Yebra, this stereotype is subverted through Gaga, who embodies a drag queen and a murderer, along with her flamboyant dancers, in an unexpected setting—the kitchen of an American middle-class family.

Gaga and Beyoncé in the Pussy Wagon, a car from Quentin Tarantino's 2003 film Kill Bill: Volume 1. Katrin Horn saw the car in "Telephone" as a symbol for "freedom, mobility, and unity" between Gaga and Beyoncé, as opposed to in Tarantino's film, where it visually represents the sexual objectification of the female protagonist. (Note: Kill Bill: Volume 1 similarly tells the story of a woman who embarks on a killing rampage.)

Katrin Horn, a postdoctoral fellow in American studies, analyzed the video's portrayal of sexuality. According to her, it was inspired by the "lesploitation" genre of B movies, known for their objectification of women's bodies and minimization of violence against women. The video subverts the genre by casting a muscular performance artist as the object of Gaga's desire, portraying female bodybuilders as prison guards and adding a "lesbian happy ending". It additionally portrays women (Note: These include a muscular inmate and "curvy" women of color.)—whom the "heteronormative culture" would normally reject—as attractive and places conventionally beautiful women in contexts that challenge their sexual allure. Horn further discussed how the video combines elements of the rape-revenge and road movie genres to create a new narrative that emphasizes female empowerment and solidarity.

In the book Lady Gaga and Popular Music: Performing Gender, Fashion, and Culture, Lori Burns and Marc Lafrance drew parallels between "Paparazzi" and "Telephone", and argued that Gaga's videos are not merely promotional but integral parts of her artistic production. For them, "Paparazzi" and "Telephone" are thematically linked works that form a broader narrative. They viewed the dance sequences in the videos as key moments in which the common themes and central narrative problems become apparent. Burns and Lafrance wrote the music videos represent two different ideas, but understanding how these oppositions are constructed is essential for fully comprehending their themes and meaning. "Paparazzi" shows a glamorous lifestyle of affluence and success, whereas "Telephone" represents crime, violence, poverty and vulgarity. The videos' chromatic elements also contrast with each other—"Paparazzi" uses opulent and refined colors, and "Telephone" employs cartoon and pop art hues. The authors believed these differences link the themes of Gaga's larger artistic interest in celebrity culture and its relation to spectacle and surveillance.

In a comparison of the videos for "Telephone" and "Video Phone", author Robin James wrote that misogyny in rap music is often used to "scapegoat black men", making them seem solely responsible for it although it is also common among white supremacists. James opined that to support post-racial (Note: The belief is that "they are bad because they are misogynist, not because they're black".) and post-feminist ideologies, the modern media has updated this trope by having female characters eliminate such misogynist black men. She found "Telephone" reinforced this belief: Gaga and Beyoncé form a "cross-racial bond" through their need to defeat the stereotypically misogynistic black man, thus confirming that the white supremacist patriarchy is indeed "multi-racial".

== Accolades ==
"Telephone" appeared in several year-end lists compiled by critics and publications, such as MTV News and PopMatters, which ranked it at number 10 and 29 respectively. The latter found it "the distilled essence of the Lady Gaga and the apex of her career to date". Rob Sheffield placed "Telephone" at number three on his Top 25 Singles of 2010 list for Rolling Stone, and Phillips placed it at number 55 for her Pitchfork top 100 list. In his description, Sheffield wrote that "Telephone" was a "communication breakdown on the dance floor" and "Beyonce, the most egregiously non-crazy pop star of our time, gets to pretend she's as nuts as Gaga for a few minutes." Phillips commented it was "one of the less weird tracks" on The Fame Monster. In the annual Pazz and Jop mass critics poll of the year's best in music, "Telephone" was ranked the 16th best single in 2010. One year later, Gary Trust of Billboard listed "Telephone" as one of the ten best all-female "hit collaborations".

In 2010, "Telephone" was nominated in the category for Fave Song at the Australian Nickelodeon Kids' Choice Awards and Favorite Song at the 37th People's Choice Awards. The following year, the song was nominated for the Grammy Award for Best Pop Collaboration with Vocals. It was recognized as one of the Most Performed Songs at the 2011 ASCAP Pop Music Awards. The same year, BMI recognized Gaga as one of the pop songwriters of the year, highlighting "Telephone" as one of her songs. It was also nominated for Best Single and won Best Collaboration at the 2011 Virgin Media Music Awards.

At the 2010 MTV Video Music Awards, the music video for "Telephone" won Best Collaboration and was nominated for Best Choreography and Video of the Year, losing both to Gaga's own "Bad Romance" video. It was placed at number three on NME's list of "50 Best Music Videos of 2010" and number seven on Spin's 20-item year-end list. Spin commented: "the decision to enlist the normally buttoned-up Beyoncé in Gaga's lezzie jailbird fantasia was genius". The writers of Pitchfork Media ranked the video as one of 2010's best. In January 2015, Billboard named it the best music video of the 2010s, writing that "Gaga had triumphed again, and that this decade was off to a spectacular start". NME placed it at number 17 on their 2011 list of the 100 best music videos of all time: "[it] eschews all the overreaching cosmic weirdness of her recent clips and settles for a nine-minute lesbo action-filled Tarantino rip-off".

== Live performances ==
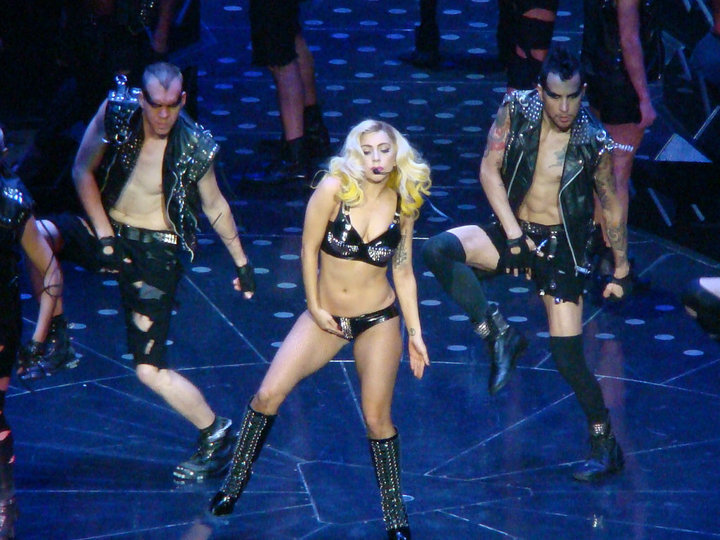
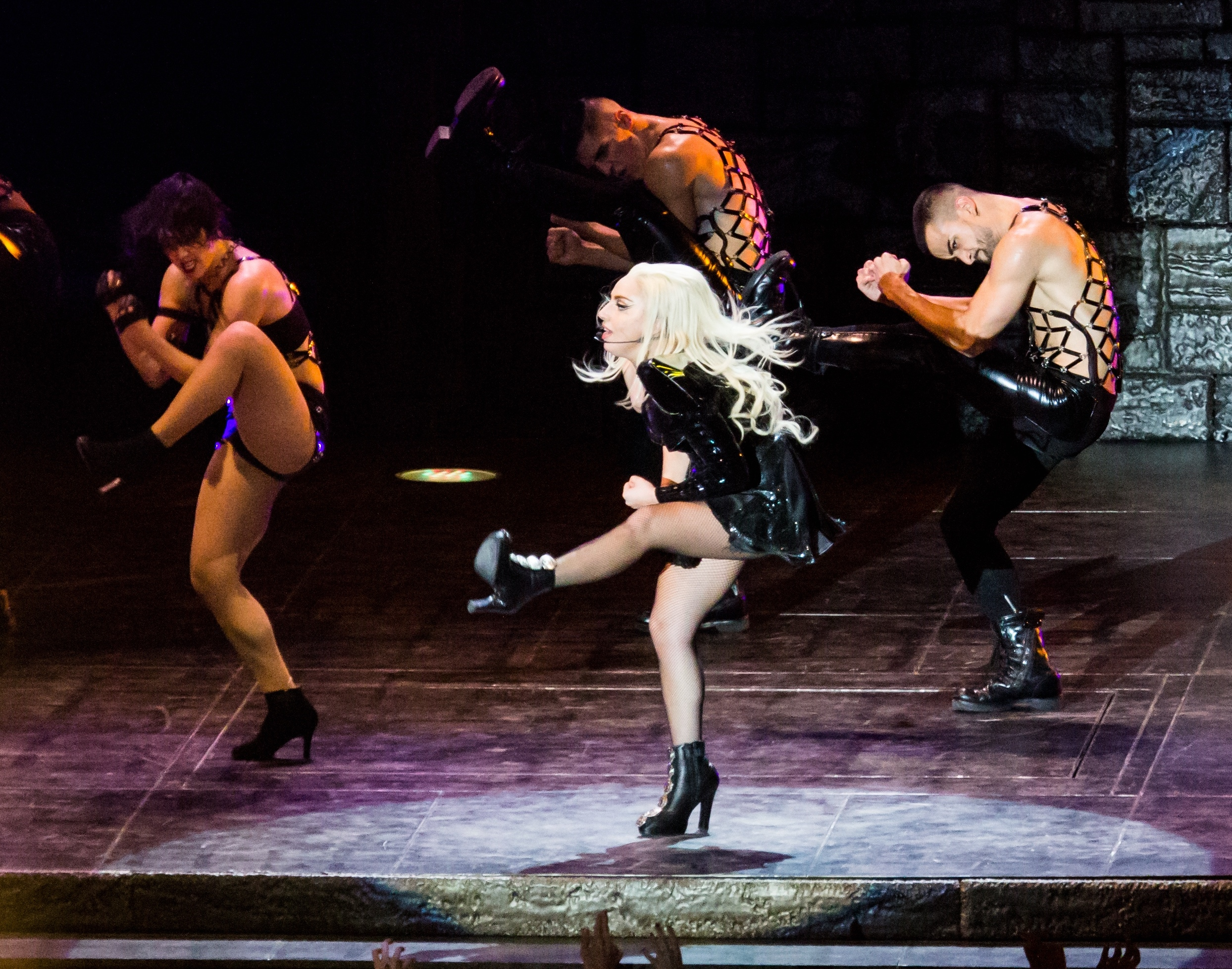
Gaga performing "Telephone" during the 2010 leg of The Monster Ball Tour (top) and on the Born This Way Ball tour (bottom) in 2012

Gaga and Beyoncé have never sung "Telephone" together on any live show, but both performed it individually. Beyoncé's only performance of "Telephone" was during her headlining Glastonbury Festival Performance on June 26, 2011. Gaga first sang "Telephone" with "Dance in the Dark", the fourth single from The Fame Monster, at the 2010 Brit Awards, where she wore an all-white outfit, complete with a lace mask by Philip Treacy and a Marie Antoinette-style wig. Inspired by the recent death of her friend, fashion designer Alexander McQueen, she changed the concept of her performance at the last minute to pay tribute to him. Gaga said, "I wanted to do a very, very forward performance, something that I felt was a true representation of the future." She sang "Telephone" in an acoustic rendition while playing on the piano. The performance was described as more restrained compared to her previous ones by The Wall Street Journal. In 2015, Liv Moss of Official Charts Company called it one of the "biggest, best and weirdest" performances in the history of Brit Awards. The following year, Daniel Welsh of HuffPost UK cited it as one of Gaga's 15 most memorable performances on television.

Gaga added "Telephone" to The Monster Ball Tour's setlist, for the 2010–2011 leg. She was dressed in black underwear and imitated a phone call with Beyoncé at the beginning of the performance, yelling "Beyoncé? You shady bitch!" to her cell phone. She then started singing the track while doing its choreography on an extended catwalk from the main stage. On March 3, 2010, she performed "Telephone" and "Brown Eyes" (from The Fame) on the British comedy chat show Friday Night with Jonathan Ross for an episode that aired two days later. She sang "Telephone" on the Japanese television show Music Station on April 16, during which she also played a keytar. In May 2011, Gaga performed the song during Radio 1's Big Weekend in Carlisle, Cumbria. She sang it on her concert tours the Born This Way Ball (2012–2013) and the ArtRave: The Artpop Ball tour (2014); during the latter it was part of a medley with "Poker Face".

In 2017, Gaga played "Telephone" as part of her biggest hits performances during the Super Bowl LI halftime show. She started the song while holding a crystal scepter in her hand. Later that year, she sang it at Coachella, where she appeared on stage inside a glass phone booth that was maneuvered by her dancers. Gaga added "Telephone" to the setlist to her concert tours – the Joanne World Tour (2017–2018) and The Chromatica Ball (2022) – and her Las Vegas residency show, Enigma (2018–2020). Reviewing The Chromatica Ball, Gigwise's Laviea Thomas wrote that it "stood out as one of the best performances of the evening. With fire catapulting into the sky, frantic stage lights, and a shed load of energy radiating off Gaga and her dancers."

== Other versions ==
On May 2, 2010, a demo of "Telephone" featuring vocals by Britney Spears leaked on the internet. After suggestions that the version might be fake, the producer of the song, Rodney Jerkins, confirmed its authenticity via Twitter, adding that the leaked version was an early, unmixed demo recording. The demo's musical style was compared to Spears's 2007 single "Piece of Me". Rob Sheffield of Rolling Stone praised Spears's version, including it at number 25 on his Top 25 Singles of the 2010 list.

Children's music group Kidz Bop covered the song but changed its line "I'm sippin that bubb" to "I'm eating that grub" to make it family-friendly. "Telephone" was covered by Lea Michele as Rachel Berry and Jake Zyrus as Sunshine Corazon for the American TV show Glee episode "Audition", which aired on September 21, 2010. Los Angeles Times found that Zyrus "sings a remarkable duet". Hours after its release, the song entered the top 10 of US' iTunes. Released as a single, it reached number 22 in Ireland and 30 in Australia. In 2019, Jonathan Van Ness and Karamo Brown from the reality show Queer Eye performed a lip sync of the song to a positive response from reviewers. (Note: Xavier Piedra of Billboard, Gerrad Hall of Entertainment Weekly and Rose Dommu of Out) The duo wore clothes similar to Gaga's black-studded look and Beyoncé's bejeweled blue outfit in the music video.

== Track listing and formats ==
- UK CD Single
1. "Telephone" (feat. Beyoncé) – 3:40
2. "Telephone" (Alphabeat Radio Edit) [feat. Beyoncé] – 4:51
- UK iTunes digital single
1. "Telephone" (feat. Beyoncé) – 3:40
2. "Telephone" (feat. Beyoncé) [Music Video] – 9:27
- European/Brazilian/New Zealand digital downloads
  - "Telephone" (Crookers Vocal Club Remix) [feat. Beyoncé] – 4:49
  - "Telephone" (Electrolightz Remix) [feat. Beyoncé] – 4:26
  - "Telephone" (Kaskade Club Remix) [feat. Beyoncé] – 5:24
  - "Telephone" (Ming Club Remix) [feat. Beyoncé] – 4:31
  - "Telephone" (Tom Neville's Ear Ringer Radio Edit) [feat. Beyoncé] – 4:17
- UK Alphabeat Extended Remix digital download
1. "Telephone" (Alphabeat Extended Remix) [feat. Beyoncé] – 6:41
- UK DJ Dan Extended Vocal Remix digital download
1. "Telephone" (DJ Dan Extended Vocal Remix) [feat. Beyoncé] – 5:59
- French Passion Pit Remix digital download
1. "Telephone" (Passion Pit Remix) [feat. Beyoncé] – 5:12
- UK 7" inch vinyl
1. "Telephone" (feat. Beyoncé) – 3:40
2. "Telephone" (Passion Pit Remix) [feat. Beyoncé] – 5:13
- International remix EP
1. "Telephone" (Alphabeat Club Remix) [feat. Beyoncé] – 6:41
2. "Telephone" (Crookers Vocal Club Remix) [feat. Beyoncé] – 4:50
3. "Telephone" (DJ Dan Vocal Club Remix) [feat. Beyoncé] – 5:59
4. "Telephone" (DJ Dan Vocal Radio Edit) [feat. Beyoncé] – 3:28
  - Only included on the digital release
5. "Telephone" (Doctor Rosen Rosen Club Remix) [feat. Beyoncé] – 6:25
6. "Telephone" (Electrolightz Remix) [feat. Beyoncé] – 4:26
7. "Telephone" (Kaskade Club Remix) [feat. Beyoncé] – 5:24
8. "Telephone" (Ming Club Remix) [feat. Beyoncé] – 4:31
9. "Telephone" (Passion Pit Remix) [feat. Beyoncé] – 5:13
10. "Telephone" (Tom Neville's Ear Ringer Club Remix) [feat. Beyoncé] – 7:14
- "The DJ Remixes" digital EP
1. "Telephone" (Alphabeat Radio Edit) [feat. Beyoncé] – 4:49
2. "Telephone" (Crookers Dub) [feat. Beyoncé] – 5:08
3. "Telephone" (DJ Dan Dub) [feat. Beyoncé] – 6:22
4. "Telephone" (Kaskade Dub) [feat. Beyoncé] – 4:40
5. "Telephone" (Kaskade Radio Edit) [feat. Beyoncé] – 3:43
6. "Telephone" (Ming Dub) [feat. Beyoncé] – 4:03
7. "Telephone" (Ming Radio Edit) [feat. Beyoncé] – 3:12
8. "Telephone" (Tom Neville's Ear Ringer Radio Edit) [feat. Beyoncé] – 4:18
9. "Bad Romance" (DJ Paulo's GaGa Oo-La La Remix) – 9:41

== Credits and personnel ==
Credits adapted from the liner notes of The Fame Monster.

=== Recording and management ===
- Gaga's vocals recorded at Darkchild Studios (Los Angeles, California)
- Knowles' vocals recorded at Studio Groove (Osaka, Japan)
- Mixed at Chalice Studios (Los Angeles, California)
- Mastered at Oasis Mastering (Burbank, California), AfterMaster Recording and Mastering Studios (Hollywood, California)
- Knowles appears courtesy of Music World Entertainment and Columbia Records
- Published by Stefani Germanotta P/K/A Lady Gaga (BMI), Sony/ATV Songs LLC, House Of Gaga Publishing Inc., Glojoe Music Inc. (BMI) Rodney Jerkins/EMI Blackwood Music Publishing (BMI), EMI April Music (ASCAP), EMI Blackwood/RJ Productions LLC, B-Day Publishing and EMI April Music, Inc. (ASCAP)

=== Personnel ===
- Lady Gaga – lead vocals, lyrics, composition, co-producer
- Beyoncé – featured vocals, lyrics
- Rodney "Darkchild" Jerkins – lyrics, composition, arrangement, producer, mixing
- LaShawn Daniels – composition, arrangement
- Lazonate Franklin – composition
- Paul Foley – recording
- Mike "Handz" Donaldson – recording (Gaga's vocals), special effects, additional vocal production
- Hisashi Mizoguchi – recording (Beyoncé's vocals)
- Mark "Spike" Stent – mixing
- Gene Grimaldi – mastering
- Larry Ryckman and Ari Blitz – mastering
- Takayuki Matsushima – Beyoncé's vocals recording assistant
- Matty Green – mixing assistant

== Charts ==
=== Weekly charts ===
2010–2013 weekly chart performance for "Telephone"
| Chart (2010–2013) | Peak position |
|---|---|
| Australia (ARIA) | 3 |
| Austria (Ö3 Austria Top 40) | 3 |
| Belgium (Ultratop 50 Flanders) | 1 |
| Belgium (Ultratop 50 Wallonia) | 1 |
| Bulgaria (IFPI) | 2 |
| Canada Hot 100 (Billboard) | 3 |
| Canada CHR/Top 40 (Billboard) | 1 |
| Canada Hot AC (Billboard) | 3 |
| CIS Airplay (TopHit) | 3 |
| Croatia International Airplay (HRT) | 1 |
| Czech Republic (Rádio – Top 100) | 9 |
| Denmark (Tracklisten) | 1 |
| Europe (European Hot 100 Singles) | 1 |
| Finland (Suomen virallinen lista) | 7 |
| France (SNEP) | 3 |
| Germany (GfK) | 3 |
| Global Dance Songs (Billboard) | 3 |
| Greece Digital Song Sales (Billboard) | 2 |
| Hungary (Dance Top 40) | 4 |
| Hungary (Rádiós Top 40) | 4 |
| Hungary (Single Top 40) | 3 |
| Ireland (IRMA) | 1 |
| Israel (Media Forest) | 2 |
| Italy (FIMI) | 2 |
| Italy Airplay (EarOne) | 7 |
| Japan Hot 100 (Billboard) | 21 |
| Luxembourg Digital Song Sales (Billboard) | 4 |
| Mexico (Billboard Mexican Airplay) | 4 |
| Mexico Anglo (Monitor Latino) | 1 |
| Netherlands (Dutch Top 40) | 6 |
| Netherlands (Single Top 100) | 10 |
| New Zealand (Recorded Music NZ) | 3 |
| Norway (VG-lista) | 1 |
| Poland Airplay (ZPAV) | 2 |
| Poland Dance (ZPAV) | 5 |
| Romania Airplay (Media Forest) | 4 |
| Russia Airplay (TopHit) | 3 |
| Scottish Singles Sales (Official Charts) | 1 |
| South Korea (Circle) | 20 |
| South Korea Foreign (Circle) | 1 |
| Spain (Promusicae) | 5 |
| Sweden (Sverigetopplistan) | 2 |
| Switzerland (Schweizer Hitparade) | 4 |
| Ukraine Airplay (TopHit) | 32 |
| UK Singles (Official Charts) | 1 |
| US Billboard Hot 100 | 3 |
| US Adult Contemporary (Billboard) | 23 |
| US Adult Pop Airplay (Billboard) | 14 |
| US Dance Club Songs (Billboard) | 1 |
| US Pop Airplay (Billboard) | 1 |
| US Rhythmic Airplay (Billboard) | 8 |

2017 weekly chart performance for "Telephone"
| Chart (2017) | Peak position |
|---|---|
| US Hot Dance/Electronic Songs (Billboard) | 13 |

2025 weekly chart performance for "Telephone"
| Chart (2025) | Peak position |
|---|---|
| Venezuela Airplay (Record Report) | 118 |

=== Monthly charts ===
Monthly chart performance for "Telephone"
| Chart (2010) | Position |
|---|---|
| Brazil (Brasil Hot 100 Airplay) | 20 |
| Brazil (Brasil Hot Pop Songs) | 9 |
| CIS Airplay (TopHit) | 13 |
| Russia Airplay (TopHit) | 12 |
| Ukraine Airplay (TopHit) | 51 |

=== Year-end charts ===
2010 year-end chart performance for "Telephone"
| Chart (2010) | Position |
|---|---|
| Australia (ARIA) | 20 |
| Austria (Ö3 Austria Top 40) | 36 |
| Belgium (Ultratop 50 Flanders) | 11 |
| Belgium (Ultratop 50 Wallonia) | 9 |
| Brazil (Crowley Broadcast Analysis) | 30 |
| Canada (Canadian Hot 100) | 15 |
| Croatia International Airplay (HRT) | 1 |
| CIS Airplay (TopHit) | 87 |
| Denmark (Tracklisten) | 23 |
| Europe (European Hot 100 Singles) | 12 |
| France (SNEP) | 30 |
| Germany (Official German Charts) | 50 |
| Hungary (Dance Top 40) | 24 |
| Hungary (Rádiós Top 40) | 33 |
| Ireland (IRMA) | 8 |
| Italy (FIMI) | 18 |
| Italy Airplay (EarOne) | 58 |
| Japan Hot 100 (Billboard) | 87 |
| Japan Adult Contemporary (Billboard Japan) | 13 |
| Netherlands (Dutch Top 40) | 15 |
| Netherlands (Single Top 100) | 45 |
| New Zealand (Recorded Music NZ) | 32 |
| Romania (Romanian Top 100) | 61 |
| Russia Airplay (TopHit) | 85 |
| South Korea Foreign (Circle) | 8 |
| Spain (PROMUSICAE) | 20 |
| Sweden (Sverigetopplistan) | 26 |
| Switzerland (Schweizer Hitparade) | 44 |
| UK Singles (Official Charts) | 15 |
| US Billboard Hot 100 | 16 |
| US Adult Pop Airplay (Billboard) | 47 |
| US Dance Club Songs (Billboard) | 38 |
| US Pop Airplay (Billboard) | 11 |
| US Radio Songs (Billboard) | 23 |
| US Rhythmic Airplay (Billboard) | 37 |
| Worldwide (IFPI) | 4 |

2013 year-end chart performance for "Telephone"
| Chart (2013) | Position |
|---|---|
| South Korea International (Gaon) | 199 |

2017 year-end chart performance for "Telephone"
| Chart (2017) | Position |
|---|---|
| US Hot Dance/Electronic Songs (Billboard) | 92 |

== Certifications and sales ==
Certifications and sales for "Telephone"
| Region | Certification | Certified units/sales |
|---|---|---|
| Australia (ARIA) | 8× Platinum | 560,000^{‡} |
| Austria (IFPI Austria) | Platinum | 30,000^{*} |
| Belgium (BRMA) | Gold | 15,000^{*} |
| Brazil (Pro-Música Brasil) | Diamond | 250,000^{‡} |
| Canada (Music Canada) | 3× Platinum | 120,000^{*} |
| Denmark (IFPI Danmark) | Platinum | 30,000^{^} |
| France (SNEP) | Gold | 150,000^{*} |
| Germany (BVMI) | Gold | 150,000^{^} |
| Italy (FIMI) | Platinum | 30,000^{*} |
| Japan (RIAJ) PC download | Gold | 100,000^{*} |
| Japan (RIAJ) Full-length ringtone | Platinum | 250,000^{*} |
| New Zealand (RMNZ) | 3× Platinum | 90,000^{‡} |
| Norway (IFPI Norway) | 2× Platinum | 120,000^{‡} |
| South Korea | — | 1,231,326 |
| Spain (Promusicae) | Platinum | 40,000^{*} |
| Spain (Promusicae) Since 2015 | Gold | 30,000^{‡} |
| Switzerland (IFPI Switzerland) | Gold | 15,000^{^} |
| United Kingdom (BPI) | 3× Platinum | 1,800,000^{‡} |
| United States (RIAA) | 5× Platinum | 5,000,000^{‡} |
Summaries
| Worldwide | — | 7,400,000 |
^{*} Sales figures based on certification alone.^{^} Shipments figures based on certification alone.^{‡} Sales+streaming figures based on certification alone.

== Release history ==
Release dates and formats for "Telephone"
| Region | Date | Format | Version | Label(s) | Ref. |
|---|---|---|---|---|---|
| United States | January 26, 2010 | Contemporary hit radio | Original | Streamline; KonLive; Cherrytree; Interscope | |
| United States | January 26, 2010 | Hot adult contemporary | Original | Streamline; KonLive; Cherrytree; Interscope | |
| United States | January 26, 2010 | Rhythmic radio | Original | Streamline; KonLive; Cherrytree; Interscope | |
| United States | January 26, 2010 | Urban contemporary radio | Original | Streamline; KonLive; Cherrytree; Interscope | |
| Italy | February 12, 2010 | Radio airplay | Original | Universal | |
| France | February 15, 2010 | Digital download | Original | Interscope | |
| Various | February 21, 2010 | CD single | Remixes | Interscope | |
| Various | March 2, 2010 | Digital download | Remixes | Interscope | |
| Various (Note: Released only in Brazil, Europe, and New Zealand.) | March 11, 2010 | Digital download | Various | Interscope | (Note: This signifies stand-alone releases of following versions of "Telephone": Crookers vocal club remix; Electrolightz remix; Kaskade club remix; Ming club remix; Tom Neville's Ear Ringer radio remix) |
| France | March 11, 2010 | Digital download | Passion Pit remix | Interscope | |
| United Kingdom | March 14, 2010 | Digital download | Alphabeat extended remix | Polydor | |
| United Kingdom | March 14, 2010 | Digital download | DJ Dan vocal club remix | Polydor | |
| United Kingdom | March 15, 2010 | 7-inch picture disc | Original | Polydor | |
| United Kingdom | March 15, 2010 | CD single | Original | Polydor | |
| Germany | April 2, 2010 | CD single | Original | Interscope | |
| United Kingdom | April 2, 2010 | Digital download | Original | Interscope | |
| France | April 5, 2010 | Digital download | Original | Interscope | |
| France | April 6, 2010 | CD single | Original | Polydor | |

== See also ==
- List of European number-one hits of 2010
- List of Billboard Hot 100 top-ten singles in 2010
- List of number-one dance singles of 2010 (U.S.)
- List of number-one hits of 2010 (Denmark)
- List of number-one songs in Norway
- List of number-one singles from the 2010s (UK)
- Number-one singles of 2010 (Ireland)
- List of Mainstream Top 40 number-one hits of 2010 (U.S.)
- Ultratop 40 number-one hits of 2010
- Ultratop 50 number-one hits of 2010

== Cited sources ==
- Guinness World Records 2015. Guinness World Records. 2014. ISBN 978-1-908843-70-8.
- Fielder, Hugh (2012). Lady Gaga: A Monster Romance. Flame Tree Publishing. ISBN 978-0-857752-76-5.
- Halberstam, Jack (2012). Gaga Feminism: Sex, Gender, and the End of Normall. Beacon Press. ISBN 978-0-8070-1099-0.
- Horn, Katrin (2017). "Taking Pop Seriously: Lady Gaga as Camp". Women, Camp, and Popular Culture: Serious Excess. Palgrave Macmillan. pp. 193–252. ISBN 978-3-319-64845-3.
- Iddon, Martin; Marshall, Melanie L., eds. (2014). Lady Gaga and Popular Music: Performing Gender, Fashion, and Culture. Routledge Studies in Popular Music. Routledge. ISBN 978-1-134-07987-2.
  - Colton, Lisa (2014). "Chapter 4: Who's Calling? Telephone Songs, Female Vocal Empowerment and Signification". Lady Gaga and Popular Music : Performing Gender, Fashion, and Culture. Routledge. pp. 67–81.
  - Burns, Lori; Lafrance, Marc (2014). "Chapter 7: Celebrity, Spectacle, and Surveillance: Understanding Lady Gaga's 'Paparazzi' and 'Telephone' through Music, Image, and Movement". Lady Gaga and Popular Music : Performing Gender, Fashion, and Culture. Routledge. pp. 117–147.
- James, Robin (2015). "(Little) Monsters & Melancholics". Resilience & Melancholy: Pop Music, Feminism, Neoliberalism. John Hunt Publishing. pp. 133–173. ISBN 978-1-782-79461-5. Archived from the original on December 16, 2021.
- Rowen, Bess (January 2, 2014). "Gaga Feminism: Sex, Gender, and the End of Normal". Women & Performance: A Journal of Feminist Theory. 24 (1). Taylor & Francis: 117–122. doi:10.1080/0740770X.2014.898424. S2CID 143063317.
- Stasukevich, Iain (July 2010). "'Telephone' Generates Caged Heat". American Cinematographer. Vol. 91, no. 7. pp. 12–14. ISSN 0002-7928.
- Vernallis, Carol (December 2019). "Interview with Director Jonas Åkerlund". Music, Sound, and the Moving Image. 13 (2). Liverpool University Press: 231–244. doi:10.3828/msmi.2019.13. S2CID 213461596.
- Williams, Juliet (March 2014). "'Same DNA, but Born this Way': Lady Gaga and the Possibilities of Postessentialist Feminisms" (PDF). Journal of Popular Music Studies. 26 (1). Wiley-Blackwell: 28–46. doi:10.1111/jpms.12058. S2CID 145244943. Archived (PDF) from the original on April 15, 2023.
- Yebra, José M. (March 1, 2018). "Camp revamped in pop culture icon Lady Gaga: The case of 'Telephone' and 'Born this Way'" (PDF). European Journal of American Culture. 37 (1). University of Zaragoza: 39–55. doi:10.1386/ejac.37.1.39_1. Archived (PDF) from the original on April 15, 2023.
