= Jeg vil ha' dig for mig selv =

Single by Burhan G

from the album Burhan G
- Released: August 2009
- Recorded: 2009
- Genre: R&B
- Label: Copenhagen Records / mbo

Burhan G singles chronology
"Kun dig" (2008)	"Jeg vil ha' dig for mig selv" (2009)	"Mest ondt" (2010)

Music video
- "Jeg vil ha' dig for mig selv" on YouTube

"Jeg vil ha' dig for mig selv" (translated as "I want you for myself" in Danish) is a 2009 Danish language song by Danish artist Burhan G that was a hit on Tracklisten - the Danish official Top 40 singles chart, reaching number 8. It stayed a total of 30 weeks in the Norwegian chart.

The song taken from Burhan G's self-titled album Burhan G largely samples in its music the Milli Vanilli song "Girl You Know It's True" largely samples on the original song. (Burhan G Video)

Burhan G released a remix with additional rap verses featuring the duo Nik & Jay. The remix appeared in his album Burhan G Special Edition published in 2011

== Chart performance ==
Peak (2009–2010)	Highest position
Denmark (Tracklisten)	8
