= Mest ondt =

Single by Burhan G featuring Medina

from the album Burhan G
- Released: 3 August 2010
- Recorded: 2010
- Genre: Pop
- Length: 3:53
- Label: Copenhagen Records
- Songwriters: Sarah Rasmussen, Burhan G

Burhan G singles chronology
| "Jeg vil ha' dig for mig selv" (2009) | "Mest ondt" (2010) | "Tættere på himlen" (2010) |

Medina singles chronology
| "Vi to" (2010) | "Mest ondt" (2010) | "Lonely" (2010) |

Music video
- "Mest ondt" on YouTube

"Mest ondt" is a Danish language hit song by Burhan G, a Danish pop singer, songwriter and producer of Kurdish origin, featuring Danish-Chilean singer Medina. "Mest ondt" (translated as What hurts the most) was released on the Danish record label Copenhagen Records. It is the first ever #1 hit for Burhan G on Tracklisten, the official Danish Singles Chart.

"Mest ondt" was not the first collaboration between Burhan G and Medina. Medina's solo hit "Kun for mig" was rereleased later in a version featuring Burhan G in 2008 alongside a third version featuring L.O.C.

== Track listing ==
Digital download

1. "Mest ondt" (feat. Medina) - 3:53

== Chart performance ==
The single was released in March 2010 and reached number one on the Danish Singles Chart of 23 April 2010 for one week.

| Peak (2010) | Highest position |
|---|---|
| Denmark (Tracklisten) | 1 |

== Release history ==
| Region | Date | Label | Format |
|---|---|---|---|
| Denmark | 3 August 2010 | Copenhagen Records | digital download |
