= Tættere på himlen =

Single by Burhan G featuring Nik & Jay

from the album Burhan G
- Released: April 2010 / Rerelease September 2010
- Recorded: 2010
- Genre: Pop
- Label: Copenhagen Records

Burhan G singles chronology
"Mest ondt" (2010)	"Tættere på himlen" (2010)	"Søvnløs" (2011)

Nik & Jay singles chronology
"Domestic" (2009)	"Tættere på himlen" (2010)	"Fest" (2010)

Music video
- "Tættere på himlen" on YouTube

"Tættere på himlen" is a Danish language hit song by Burhan G, a Danish pop singer, songwriter and producer of Kurdish/Turkish origin, featuring Danish duo Nik & Jay. "Tættere på himlen" (translated as Closer to heaven) appeared on the 2010 album Burhan G and was released on the Danish record label Copenhagen Records. It is the second #1 hit for Burhan G on Tracklisten, the official Danish Singles Chart.

== Chart performance ==
First release

The single was originally released in April 2010 and it entered the Tracklisten, the Danish singles chart at #9 on the chart dated 24 April 2010. In its second week, it went down to #27 (chart dated 30 April 2010), thus ending its first run in the charts.

Rerelease

The single was rereleased in October 2010 entering at #27 on the Danish Singles Chart dated 1 October 2010 and jumping to #1 on chart of 8 October 2010 in its second week of rerelease.

Peak (2010)	Highest position
Denmark (Tracklisten)	1

== Certifications ==
Certifications for "Tættere på himlen"
Region	Certification	Certified units/sales
Denmark (IFPI Danmark)	2× Platinum	40,000^{‡}
^{‡} Sales+streaming figures based on certification alone.
