= Burhan G =

Danish singer

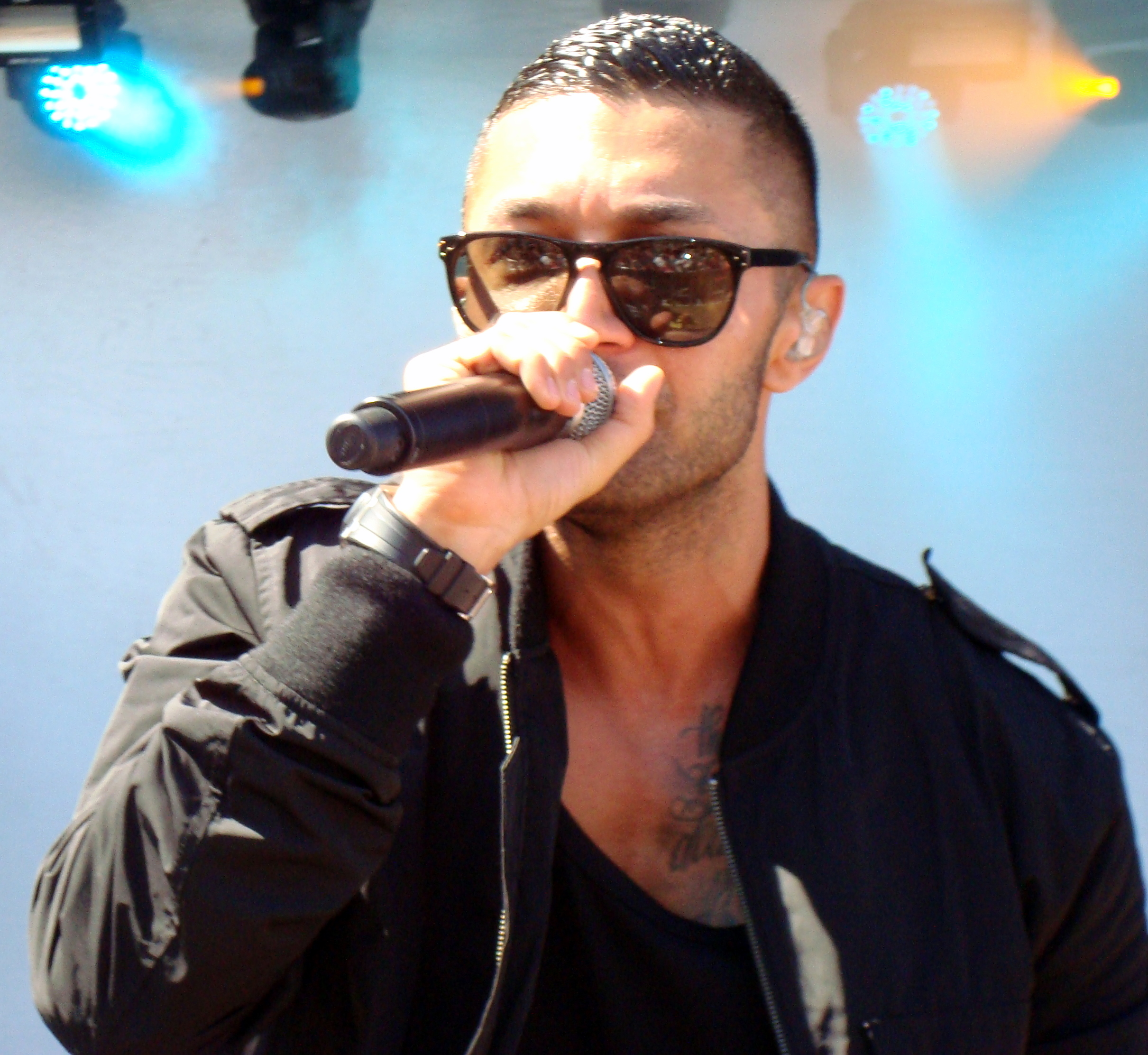
- Burhan G during Skive Festival on 4 June 2011 (Photo: A.C. Hamann Nielsson)

Background information
- Born: Burhan Genç Koç; 20 January 1983 (age 43); Copenhagen, Denmark
- Origin: Kurdish
- Genres: Pop, R&B
- Occupations: Singer, songwriter, record producer, musician
- Instrument: Vocals
- Years active: 2003–present
- Labels: BMG (2003–2007); Copenhagen Records (2007–2020)

Burhan Genç Koç (Danish: [ˈpuɐ̯hɑn ke̝ˀntɕ ˈkʰɔˀtɕ]; born 20 January 1983), known as Burhan G (Danish: [ˈpuɐ̯hɑn ˈke̝ˀ]), is a Danish R&B and pop singer, songwriter and producer. He has released three albums including Burhan G in 2010 and Din for evigt, both certified platinum in Denmark. Hit singles include the five number one hits "Mest ondt" featuring Medina, "Tættere på himlen" featuring Nik & Jay, "Din for evigt", "Kalder mig hjem" and "Karma" featuring L.O.C.

== Early life and career ==
Burhan Genç is of Kurdish origin. His parents are from Haymana, Turkey. He lived in Brøndby Strand (Copenhagen County) 13 kilometers south-west of central Copenhagen and sang in the "Københavns Drengekor" (Copenhagen Boys Choir) as a solo soprano. He was also a backing singer for the popular Danish hip hop group Outlandish. The group originated from Brøndby Strand projects and Burhan G toured with the group as backing vocals and also delivered the chorus in the Outlandish hit "Walou" from their debut album Outland's Official. Collaborations followed with various other acts including Funk Flush, Cas and U$O.

== Career ==
Burhan G's solo debut was with the signature track "Burhan G", which was on P3 Radio's Uundgåelige in September 2003. On 24 May 2004, Burhan G released his debut album Playground on BMG, with a further track featured on Danish Radio P3's Uundgåelige with single "Take U Home". The album Playground got Burhan G nominated in 2005 to 3 categories in the Danish Music Awards. He won the award for Best Danish Newcomer. He was nominated for Danish P3 Radio's "P3 Prisen" and "P3 Gennembrudet" at P3 Guld ceremonies. That same year he won the award for "Best Danish Album" at the Danish DeeJay Awards.

In March 2007, Burhan G signed with record label Copenhagen Records instead of BMG and on 10 September 2007 released with them his second album Breakout and a single from the album cowritten by Burhan G and Frederik Tao from Maximum Risk and entitled "Who Is He" became a hit.

In the summer of 2008, Burhan G released his new single "Kun dig" ("Only you"). It was written in collaboration with Claus Seest and produced by Majid and Saqib. The song was Burhan G's first hit in Danish followed by a Danish-language album, the self-titled Burhan G. This was followed by another successful single written in collaboration with Rasmus Seebach in Danish entitled "Jeg vil ha' dig for mig selv" ("I want you for myself") that heavily sampled Milli Vanilli's 1988 hit "Girl You Know It's True". Parts of the lyrics came from Nik & Jay's song "I Love Ya" and in November 2009, that version was released by Nik & Jay providing vocals.

In April 2010, Burhan G collaborated with Rasmus Seebach again alongside Sarah West and Nik & Jay. He explained in a press release that he chose to express himself in Danish, "because I love music and because I love all the different ways one can express oneself" claiming he was inspired by artists Kim Carnes and Sanne Salomonsen and Kim Larsen. This Danish venture proved quite well as it gave Burhan G his first ever Danish No. 1 in "Mest ondt" (translated as What hurts the most) released on 8 March 2010 and reaching the Tracklisten (Danish Singles Chart) top spot for 1 week. The single features the Danish singer Medina. The follow-up single "Tættere på himlen" featuring Nik & Jay also topped the charts for three weeks in October 2010. Both were certified platinum in addition to a preceding single "Jeg vil ha' dig for mig selv" also certified platinum. "Who Is He" and "Kun dig" singles have been certified gold in Denmark.

== Collaborations ==
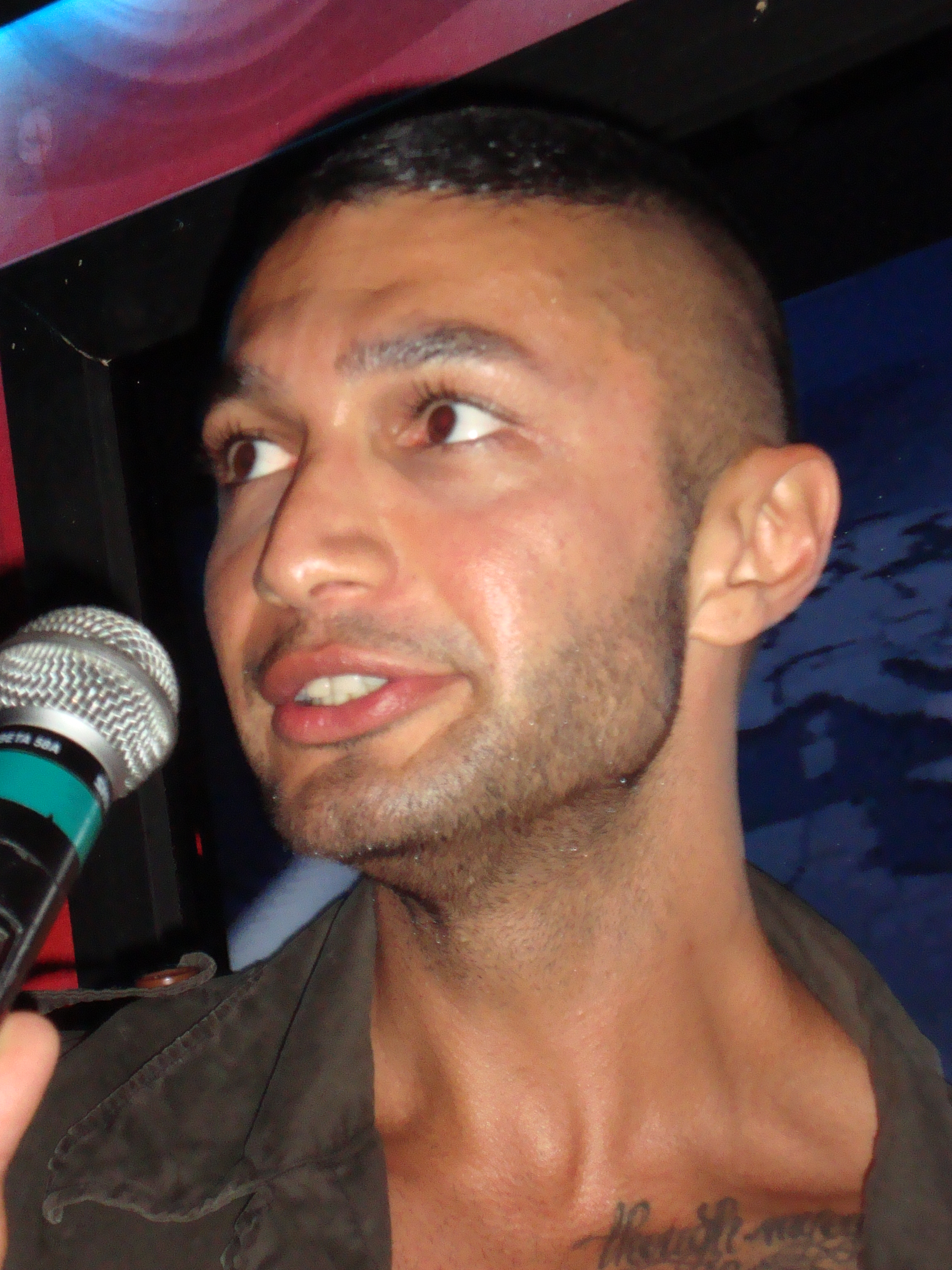
Burhan G in May 2011. (Photo: A.C. Hamann Nielsson)

Burhan G has collaborated with a great number of artists:

- He collaborated early on with various other acts including Funk Flush and A-Double-B
- He appeared in U$O song "I går var det en vild nat" (translated as Yesterday was a wild night)
- He also sang in the soundtrack song entitled "Live Ur Life" on director Hella Joof's film Fidibus.
- He had guest appearances with many artists including Majid, Kisa and Karina Kappel.
- Burhan co-wrote and contributed in the vocals of "Let Me Think About It" in Ida Corr's album Robosoul in 2006.
- In September 2007 he appeared in Dutch House DJ Fedde le Grand remixed album that was a huge international hit for Fedde le Grand, including Europe and the United States.
- In June 2009, Burhan also appeared in an international hit by House DJ Dominik de Leon entitled "Everything Changes" and credits Dominik de Leon vs. Burhan G.
- Burhan G has written "Tag med mig" (translated Come with me) for Basim, in the latter's album Alt det jeg ville have sagt (translated Everything I would have said).
- He also worked with American DJ Roger Sanchez in "Bang That Box".
- He co-wrote and produced the song "Domino Effect" to the English dancepop duo Addictive released in October 2009.
- His hit "Mest ondt" features the Danish singer Medina.
- The follow-up single "Tættere på himlen" features Nik & Jay.

== Awards ==
- In 2005, nominated for 3 categories in the Danish Music Awards and won the award for "Best Danish Newcomer".
- Nominated for Danish P3 Radio's "P3 Prisen" and "P3 Gennembrudet" at P3 Guld ceremonies.
- He won the award for "Best Danish Album" at the Danish DeeJay Awards in 2005

== Discography ==
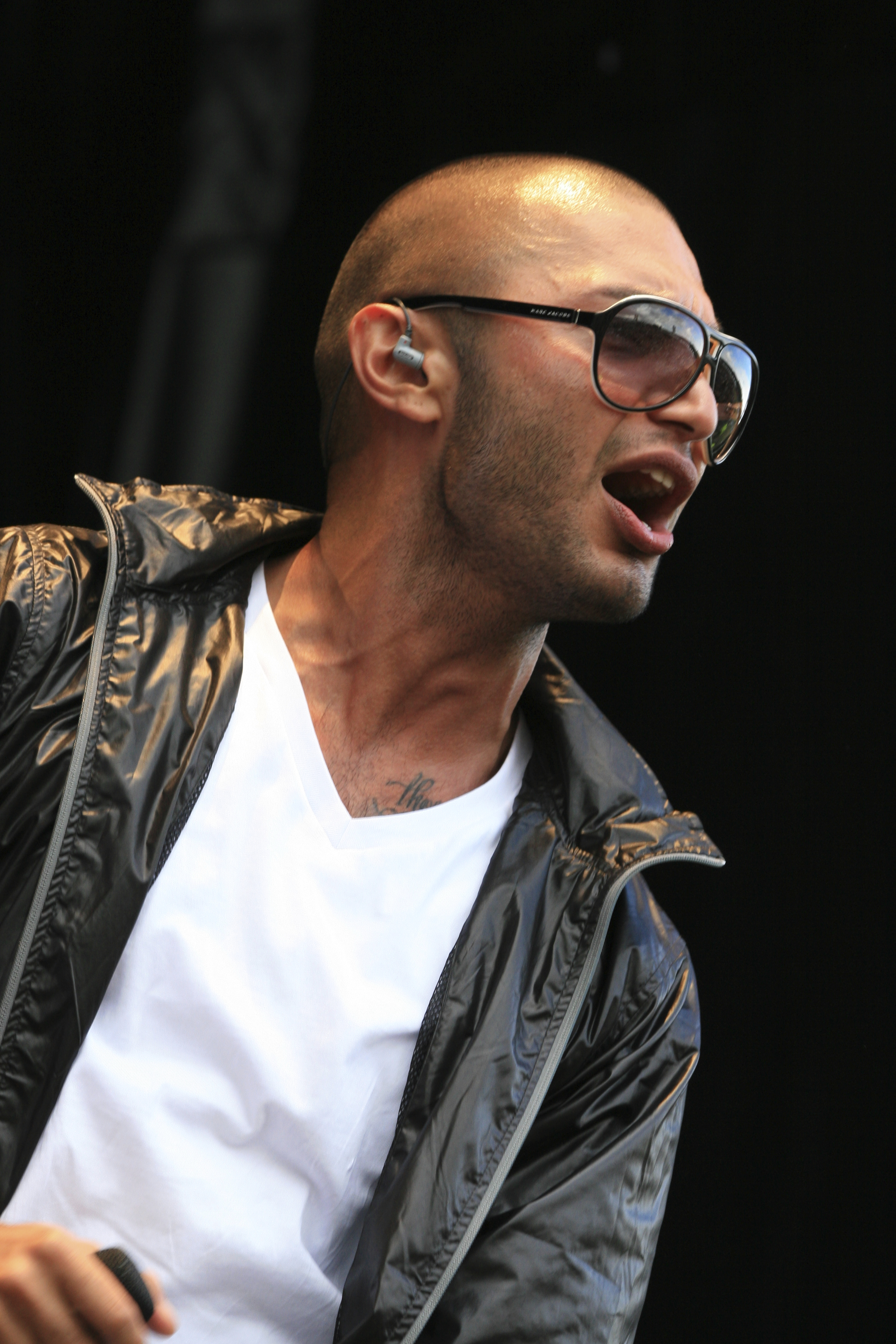
Burhan G at Grøn Koncert on 20 July 2008 (Photo: Simon Wedege Petersen)

=== Albums ===
Year	Title	Peak position	Certification
Year	Title	DEN	Certification
2004	Playground	29	
2007	Breakout	15	
2010	Burhan G	2	7× Platinum
2013	Din for evigt	1	3× Platinum
2016	Pas på pigerne	4	
2019	Et barn af jul	2	

Other albums

- 2011: Burhan G Special Edition (Burhan G album plus additional tracks)
- 2012: Burhan G (Burhan G album plus additional tracks)

=== Singles ===
Year	Song	Peak	Certification	Album
Year	Song	DEN	Certification	Album
2003	"Burhan G"	4		Playground
2004	"Playground"	—		Playground
2004	"Take U Home"	—		Playground
2007	"Who Is He"	36	Gold	Breakout
2007	"Can't Let U Go"	25		Breakout
2008	"Sacrifice"	—		Breakout
2008	"Kun dig"	20	Gold	Burhan G
2009	"Jeg vil ha' dig for mig selv"	8	Platinum	Burhan G
2010	"Mest ondt" (feat. Medina)	1	Platinum	Burhan G
2010	"Tættere på himlen" (feat. Nik & Jay)	1	IFPI DEN: 2× Platinum	Burhan G
2011	"Søvnløs"	9	Platinum	Burhan G
2011	"Tag hvad du vil" (Ankerstjerne and Burhan G)	2	Platinum	Burhan G (Special Edition)
2011	"Jeg' i live"	2	Platinum	Burhan G (Special Edition)
2013	"Din for evigt"	1	Gold	Din for evigt
2013	"Kalder mig hjem"	1	Gold	Din for evigt
2013	"Ikke i nat, ikke endnu"	11		Din for evigt
2013	"Kærlighed & krig" (feat. Caroline Frances)	31		Din for evigt
2013	"Hvorfor ikke mig"	18		Non-album single
2014	"Ikke i nat, ikke endnu"	11		Din for evigt
2014	"Karma" (feat. L.O.C.)	1		Din for evigt
2014	"Kærlighed & krig" (feat. Molly Sandén)	3		Din for evigt
2016	"Lucy"	36		Pas på pigerne
2016	"Nathalia"	—		Pas på pigerne
2016	"Diana"	—		Pas på pigerne
2017	"Alle elsker kærlighed" (feat. Rasmus Nøhr)	—		Pas på pigerne
2017	"Tinka" (with Frida Brygmann)	1		Et barn af jul
2020	"Nu er det jul (Nissebanden)"	28		Et barn af jul
2021	"Burhan G" (with Kidd and Tobias Rahim)	13		Non-album singles
2021	"Luftkys" (with Tessa)	34		Non-album singles
2022	"Walou" (with Stepz, Sivas and Outlandish)	22		Non-album singles
2026	"Gemt dit nummer" (with Medina)	6		Non-album singles

==== Featured in ====
- 2007: "Lean on Me" (Majid featuring Burhan G)
- 2008: "Kun for mig" (Medina featuring Burhan G)
- 2011: "Bølgerne ved vesterhavetnik" (Nik & Jay featuring Eivor and Burhan G)
- 2011: "Fugt i fundamentet" (Nik & Ras featuring Pharfar and Burhan G)

== Videography ==
- "Burhan G"
- "Who Is He"
- "Sacrifice"
- "Jeg vil ha' dig for mig selv"
- "Mest ondt" feat. Medina
- "Tættere på himlen" feat. Nik & Jay
- "Søvnløs"
- "Jeg' I Live"
