= Providers (music producers) =

Providers is a Danish hip hop, R&B and pop song production team made up of Jeppe Federspiel and Rasmus Stabell.

Jeppe Federspiel and Rasmus Stabell started as musicians playing drums. Years later, they joined forces to form Providers, an urban production team. They are best known for having produced Medina's album Velkommen til Medina and the double platinum-selling hit single from the album "Kun for mig" (translated as Only for me) that reached the top of the Danish Singles Chart Tracklisten staying for 7 weeks at #1 and selling +60,000 copies totalling 63 weeks in the Danish charts. It was released in its English version as "You and I" and was a Top 40 hit in UK Singles Chart and reached #3 in Bulgaria and at #10 in Germany.

Providers have written and produced for a number of well-known artists such as: Medina, Jay Sean, Szhirley, L.O.C., Outlandish, Ataf Khawaja, Burhan G, Rasmus Seebach, Majid, Remee, Terri Bjerre, Boyo, Charlie Sachs, and Kenisha Pratt.

In 2009, they produced the single "Natteravn" (vs. Providers) from Rasmus Seebach's same name album, the second biggest selling album of Denmark in 2009. The single "Natteravn" was a hit in Danish charts and reached #6 in Sweden.

Jeppe Federspiel and Rasmus Stabell operate together with Thomas Borresen record company Labelmade, which has artists like Medina and Svenstrup & Vendelboe
