= Kun for mig =

2008 single by Medina

Single by Medina

from the album Velkommen til Medina
- Released: 22 September 2008
- Recorded: 2008
- Genre: Electropop
- Length: 4:12
- Songwriters: Medina Valbak; Jeppe Federspiel and Rasmus Stabell (Providers)
- Producer: Providers

Medina singles chronology
"Okay" (2008)	"Kun for mig" (2008)	"Velkommen til Medina" (2009)

"Kun for mig" (Danish pronunciation: [ˈkʰɔn fɒ ˈmɑj]; English: "Just for me") is a song by Danish singer Medina. The song is written by Medina, Jeppe Federspiel and Rasmus Stabell. It was released in 2008 in Denmark by Medina. The song peaked at #1 of the Danish Singles Chart for 7 weeks in 3 runs and stayed a total of 63 weeks in the Danish charts. The track was produced by hip hop producers Providers.

"Kun for dig" ([ˈkʰɔn fɒ ˈtɑj]; meaning "Just for you") a duet version of "Kun for mig" released by Medina with rapper L.O.C. (Liam O'Connor) also reached #1 in the Danish Singles chart for a week in July 2009.

== Track list ==
- Single
1. "Kun for mig" – 4:12
- Remix EP
1. "Kun for mig" (DJ Aligator Club Remix) – 5:56
2. "Kun for mig" (DJ Aligator Radio Remix) – 3:59
3. "Kun for mig" (Rune RK Remix) – 6:00
4. "Kun for mig" (Spider Monkey Remix) – 7:59
5. "Kun for mig" (Svendstrup & Vendelboe Remix) – 5:04

== Versions ==
=== Kun for dig (Medina feat. L.O.C.) ===
"Kun for dig"

Single by Medina feat. L.O.C.
- Released: 6 July 2009
- Recorded: 2008
- Genre: Electropop
- Songwriters: Medina Valbak; Jeppe Federspiel and Rasmus Stabell (Providers)
- Producer: Providers

"Kun for dig" (meaning "Just for you" in Danish) was a version of "Kun for mig" (meaning "Just for me" in Danish) released by Medina with rapper L.O.C. (Liam O'Connor).

=== Medina feat. Burhan G version ===
"Kun for mig"

Single by Medina feat. Burhan G
- Released: 2009
- Recorded: 2008
- Genre: Electropop
- Songwriters: Medina Valbak; Jeppe Federspiel and Rasmus Stabell (Providers)
- Producer: Providers

Another version was released in 2009 by Medina featuring Burhan G. It did not chart in the Danish Singles Chart.

=== English version ===
"You and I", an English language version, was released internationally with lyrics translated into English by Adam Powers and Julie Steincke. It was released in the UK on 21 September 2009 by Parlophone. "You and I" debuted at #80 on the UK Singles Chart on 10 October 2009 and peaked at #39 two weeks later. In 2010 it peaked at #3 in Bulgaria and at #10 in Germany.

== Charts ==
Kun for mig

Chart	Peak position
Denmark (Tracklisten)	1

Kun for dig

Chart	Peak position
Denmark (Tracklisten)	1
