= List of Danish musicians =

This is a list of notable Danish musicians and singers in alphabetical order by their last name:

== A ==
- Afenginn
- Alphabeat
- Henrik Andersen
- Ars Nova Copenhagen
- Aphaca
- Aqua
- Artillery
- Ella Augusta

== B ==
- Rasmus Bille Bahncke
- Tanne Balcells
- Bamses Venner
- Basim
- Julie Berthelsen
- Bikstok Røgsystem
- Birmingham 6
- The Blue Van
- Victor Borge
- Brixx
- Dieterich Buxtehude
- Ben & Tan

== C ==
- C21
- Debbie Cameron
- Henrik Carlsen
- Carpark North
- Noah Carter
- The Cartoons
- Tim Christensen
- Cisilia
- Ida Corr

== D ==
- Danheim
- D1MA
- Anna David
- Daze
- Lonnie Devantier
- Tina Dickow
- Dicte
- René Dif
- Aura Dione
- Dizzy Mizz Lizzy
- DJ Encore
- Dominus
- DQ
- Danish Quartet
- Dreamers' Circus
- Dúné

== E ==
- Efterklang
- Amir El-Falaki
- Michael Elo
- Eloq
- Evil Masquerade

== F ==
- Bent Fabricius-Bjerre
- Fate
- Fielfraz
- Figurines
- Sharin Foo
- Anders Frandsen
- Lars Frederiksen
- Fallulah
- Fyr og Flamme

== G ==
- Jacob Gade
- Niels W. Gade
- Galimatias
- Gangway
- Gasolin'
- Susanne Georgi
- Holger Gilbert-Jespersen
- Gobs
- Peder Gram

== H ==
- Lars Hannibal
- Hatesphere
- Caroline Henderson
- Mikkel Hess
- Hit'n'Hide
- Jullie Hjetland
- Ste van Holm
- Horrorpops
- Hot Eyes
- Hurdy Gurdy
- Húsakórið

== I ==
- Icekiid
- Illdisposed
- Laura Illeborg
- Infernal
- Grethe Ingmann
- Jørgen Ingmann

== J ==
- Knud Jeppesen
- Jokeren
- Junior Senior
- Jada

== K ==
- Kaka
- Kølig Kaj
- Kashmir
- Kidd
- King Diamond
- Birthe Kjær
- Anders Kjølholm
- Kliché
- Klumben
- Klutæ
- Kalibre
- Kim Larsen
- Keld Heick
- Kellermensch
- Katrine Madsen

== L ==
- Laban
- Laid Back
- Lamin
- Jon Larsen
- Late Night Venture
- Randi Laubek
- Ida Laurberg
- Lazyboy
- Leæther Strip
- Anne Linnet
- Hans Christian Lumbye
- Lis Sørensen
- Lukas Graham
- Lydmor

== M ==
- Frederik Magle
- Mas
- Malene Mortensen
- Malk de Koijn
- Manticora
- MC Einar
- Me & My
- Mekdes
- Mercenary
- Mercyful Fate
- Mew
- Michael Learns to Rock
- Christine Milton
- Anila Mirza
- Miss Papaya
- Mnemic
- Mofus
- John Mogensen
- MØ
- Marie Key
- Mumle

== N ==
- The Naked
- Nanna
- Nekromantix
- Nephew
- Ulrik Neumann
- Carl Nielsen
- Per Nielsen
- Nik & Jay
- Claus Norreen
- Rasmus Nøhr
- Per Nørgård
- Niarn

== O ==
- Agnes Obel
- Andreas Odbjerg
- Oh Land
- Oh No Ono
- Olsen Brothers
- Lee Oskar
- Outlandish

== P ==
- Pegboard Nerds
- Mek Pek
- Pharfar
- Pind
- Johanne Astrid Poulsen
- Michael Poulsen
- Pretty Maids
- Psyched Up Janis
- Pyramaze
- Pede B
- Erik Paaske

== R ==
- Tobias Rahim
- Benjamin Rosenbohm
- Lina Rafn
- Søren Rasted
- Raunchy
- The Raveonettes
- Simon Ravn
- Remee
- Bryan Rice
- Ridin' Thumb
- Rollo & King
- Rune RK
- Michael Rune

== S ==
- Natasja Saad
- Safri Duo
- Sanne Salomonsen
- Saba
- Savage Rose
- Saybia
- Aksel Schiøtz
- Hannah Schneider
- Rasmus Seebach
- Sebastian
- Liselotte Selbiger
- Sidsel Ben Semmane
- Sissal
- Sivas
- Shu-Bi-Dua
- S.O.A.P.
- Sort Sol
- Spleen United
- Superheroes
- Jakob Sveistrup
- Bent Sørensen
- Stine Bramsen
- Søren Torpegaard Lund

== T ==
- Tiggy
- Johannes Torpe
- Toy-Box
- Trentemøller
- Thomas Troelsen
- TV-2
- Tommy Seebach
- Tomas Barfod

== U ==
- Lars Ulrich
- URO
- Under Byen

== V ==
- Alex Vargas
- Volbeat

== W ==
- Rasmus Walter
- Sune Rose Wagner
- Annika Wedderkopp
- Anton Westerlin
- Christopher Ernst Friedrich Weyse
- Whigfield
- Thomas Wilfred
- Birthe Wilke
- Gustav Winckler
- WhoMadeWho

== Z ==
- Zididada

== See also ==
- List of Danes
- List of Danish actors
- Lists of musicians

== Sources ==
- "Danske musikere og grupper før 1960" (in Danish). Lex – Denmark's National Encyclopedia.
- "Danske musikere og grupper 1960-1990" (in Danish). Lex – Denmark's National Encyclopedia.
- "Danske musikere og grupper efter 1990" (in Danish). Lex – Denmark's National Encyclopedia.
