= List of Danish bands =

This is a list of notable Danish bands and musical groups. For individual singers or musicians, please see list of Danish musicians.

== A ==
- A Friend in London
- Achillea
- Afenginn
- Alphabeat
- Analogik
- Artillery
- Aqua
- The Asteroids Galaxy Tour

== B ==
- Baal
- Baby Woodrose
- Barcode Brothers
- Beyond Twilight
- Bikstok Røgsystem
- Birmingham 6
- Black City
- Blue Foundation
- The Blue Van
- The Breakers
- Brixx
- Bryan Rice

== C ==
- C21
- Camille Jones
- Carpark North
- Cartoons
- Choir of Young Believers
- Creamy
- Cut'N'Move

== D ==
- D-A-D
- Danser med Drenge
- Daze
- De Nattergale
- Dizzy Mizz Lizzy
- Dodo and the Dodos
- Dominus
- Dúné
- Dreamers' Circus
- De Eneste To
- djames braun

== E ==
- Electric Guitars
- Efterklang
- Evil Masquerade
- EyeQ

== F ==
- The Fashion
- Fate
- Fielfraz
- Figurines
- Filur
- The Floor is Made of Lava
- A Friend in London
- Future 3
- Forever Still

== G ==
- Gangway
- Gasolin'
- Gnags
- Grand Avenue
- Grethe & Jørgen Ingmann

== H ==
- Hatesphere
- Hej Matematik
- Heidra
- Hit'n'Hide
- Hjertestop
- HorrorPops
- Hurdy Gurdy
- Hot Eyes
- Húsakórið

== I ==
- I Got You On Tape
- Iceage
- Infernal
- Illdisposed
- Indigo Sun (Ida Nielsen)

== J ==
- Johnny Deluxe
- Johann
- Junior Senior
- Junker

== K ==
- Kashmir
- Kellermensch
- Kliché
- Klutæ
- King Diamond
- The Kissaway Trail

== L ==
- Laban
- Laid Back
- Lars Lilholt Band
- Lazyboy
- Leæther Strip
- Little Trees
- The Loft (Danish band)
- Los Umbrellos
- Love Shop
- Lukas Graham
- L.I.G.A

== M ==
- Mabel
- Magtens Korridorer
- Malk de Koijn
- Malurt
- Mames Babegenush
- Manticora
- Medina
- Me & My
- Mercenary
- Mercyful Fate
- Mew
- Michael Learns to Rock
- moi Caprice
- The Minds of 99
- Mnemic
- Mofus
- Møl

== N ==
- Natural Born Hippies
- The Naked
- Nekromantix
- Nephew
- Niels Hausgaard
- Nik og Jay
- New Politics

== O ==
- Oh No Ono
- Olsen Brothers
- Outlandish

== P ==
- Panamah
- Page Four
- Paw & Lina
- Phlake
- Pretty Maids
- Psyched Up Janis
- Private
- Pyramaze
- Puls

== R ==
- Racetrack Babies
- Raunchy
- The Raveonettes
- Red Warszawa
- Ridin' Thumb
- Rollo & King
- Royal Hunt

== S ==
- S.O.A.P.
- Safri Duo
- The Sandmen
- Saturnus (band)
- Savage Rose
- Saybia
- The Seven Mile Journey
- Shu-Bi-Dua
- Skarn
- Slaraffenland
- The Sonic Dawn
- Sort Sol
- Sorten Muld
- Spleen United
- Steppeulvene
- The Storm
- Substereo
- Supercharger
- Superheroes
- Svartsot
- Swan Lee

== T ==
- Tesco Value
- Tolkien Ensemble
- Toy-Box
- Treefight for Sunlight
- Trust
- Turboweekend
- TV-2
- Tøsedrengene

== U ==
- Under Byen

== V ==
- VETO
- Volbeat
- VOLA

== W ==
- When Saints Go Machine
- WhoMadeWho
- The William Blakes

== Z ==
- Zididada

== Æ ==
- Æter

== See also ==
- Music of Denmark
- List of Danish musicians
