= Rarities/B-Sides =

Compilation album by The Raveonettes
- Released: 15 December 2011
- Recorded: 2000–2007
- Genres: Indie rock, shoegaze, noise pop, post-punk revival
- Length: 78:16
- Labels: Columbia, Vice Records
- Producers: Sune Rose Wagner, Richard Gottehrer on 8-19

The Raveonettes chronology
Raven in the Grave (2011)	Rarities/B-Sides (2011)	Into the Night (2012)

Singles from Rarities/B-Sides
- 1. "The Christmas Song" Released: 3 December 2003

Rarities/B-Sides is the first compilation album by The Raveonettes, and it was released on 15 December 2011 on 500 CD and 500 double 180 gram LP.

== Background ==
This limited edition collection compiles b-side and rare material spanning Whip It On, Chain Gang of Love, Pretty in Black and Lust Lust Lust. Covers released as b-sides or bonus tracks are not included; specifically Eddie Cochran's C'mon Everybody, Hank Williams' I'm So Lonesome I Could Cry, and Buddy Holly's Everyday.

Rarities/B-Sides marks the first time the 2003 single The Christmas Song has been available on an album, as the song was absent from the 2008 Christmas EP Wishing You a Rave Christmas. Despite that the song has never been included on an album, Sune Rose Wagner stated "it has since become our biggest selling song ever with appearances in countless movies, commercials, etc."

The album art contains various photographs and a poster by contemporary artist and photographer Todd Hido. Hido previously worked with The Raveonettes when he directed the video for the Raven in the Grave single Apparitions.

== Reception ==
NME's Hardeep Phull gave the compilation a positive review stating "Quality control has clearly never been a problem for the Raveonettes. Quantity control on the other hand has been something of on an ongoing nightmare for the Danish duo. Having an embarrassment of riches comes with its own problems but thanks to Rarities/B-Sides, that problem has been emphatically solved."

== Track listing ==
All tracks are written by Sune Rose Wagner.

No.	Title	Length
1.	"Signal's Changed"	2:29
2.	"Experiment in Black"	2:15
3.	"Evil L.A. Girls"	2:40
4.	"Go Girl Go"	2:57
5.	"Demon's Fire"	2:30
6.	"Wanna Dance"	1:47
7.	"Rebel Invasion"	2:40
8.	"Bubblegum"	2:47
9.	"Get Lost"	2:20
10.	"I Get Sick"	2:23
11.	"The Christmas Song"	2:15
12.	"Vamp, Scratch, Whore"	2:54
13.	"I Wanna Be Taken"	3:03
14.	"Oh, the Time"	3:15
15.	"Go On and Kiss Me"	2:19
16.	"Black Wave"	4:24
17.	"Be My Sunshine"	3:05
18.	"Railroad Tracks"	2:19
19.	"Dreams Come True"	2:52
20.	"Please You"	2:55
21.	"And Lovers Came"	3:33
22.	"Love on Barbed Wire"	3:09
23.	"Another Noise" (CD bonus track)	4:41
24.	"The Landlord"	4:03
25.	"Where Hearts Are Dead"	2:47
26.	"Forever in Your Arms"	2:53
27.	"Honey, I Never Had You"	3:11

LP track listing
No.	Title	Length
1.	"Signal's Changed"	2:29
2.	"Experiment in Black"	2:15
3.	"Evil L.A. Girls"	2:40
4.	"Go Girl Go"	2:57
5.	"Demon's Fire"	2:30
6.	"Wanna Dance"	1:47
7.	"Rebel Invasion"	2:40
8.	"Bubblegum"	2:47
9.	"Get Lost"	2:20
10.	"I Get Sick"	2:23
11.	"Vamp, Scratch, Whore"	2:54
12.	"I Wanna Be Taken"	3:03
13.	"Please You"	2:55
14.	"The Christmas Song"	2:15
15.	"Oh, the Time"	3:15
16.	"Go On and Kiss Me"	2:19
17.	"Black Wave"	4:24
18.	"Be My Sunshine"	3:05
19.	"Railroad Tracks"	2:19
20.	"Dreams Come True"	2:52
21.	"And Lovers Came"	3:33
22.	"Love on Barbed Wire"	3:09
23.	"The Landlord"	4:03
24.	"Where Hearts Are Dead"	2:47
25.	"Forever in Your Arms"	2:53
26.	"Honey, I Never Had You"	3:11

- CD Track 1: Pre The Raveonettes. Tracks 2–7: from Whip It On recording sessions. Tracks 8–10: from Chain Gang Of Love recording sessions. Tracks 12–19: from Pretty In Black recording sessions. Track 20: Written for the Danish movie Nordkraft. Tracks 21–27: from Lust, Lust, Lust recording sessions.
