= Rock music in Denmark =

Danish rock is rock music played in Denmark. Starting in the 1950s, rock music was inspired by the United States of America, where it was becoming extremely popular, although records could be difficult to obtain in the country. Danish jazz artists began adopting the rock genre. Towards the end of the 1950s and throughout the 1960s, Danish rock was heavily influenced by British music, one of the genres being R&B. By the late 1960s, Danish rock was again influenced by American rock. During the 1980s, the Danish rock consisted mainly of pop-rock bands, until the rock subgenre grunge broke through to the mainstream in the 1990s. In the late 1990s and early 21st century Indie rock was very popular.

== Historical development ==
While American rock and roll music was influential, it remained difficult to obtain in Denmark in the 1950s; Elvis Presley records were not officially released there until 1958. This left ample room for both Danish and British artists to gain mindshare.

Danish jazz and dance bands and soloists like Ib Jensen, Otto Brandenburg, Peter Plejl and Ib Glindemann brought the style to Danish listeners. At the end of the decade, the English band The Shadows was a major influence on the first pioneers of the era, The Cliffters and The Rocking Ghosts.

In the early 1960s, British R&B and beat bands inspired Danish counterparts like The Hitmakers, Sir Henry & His Butlers, The Defenders and The Beefeaters, as well as the breakthrough band Steppeulvene, whose 1967 LP Hip revolutionized the field of Danish rock by fusing American folk rock. Young Flowers was the first rock trio; some of their songs were in Danish language, but several others were adaptions of Walt Whitman lyrics. Alrune Rod and Savage Rose were among the popular bands in Denmark throughout the 1960s and early 1970s. Still, Danish rock and pop music in those days resembled more of German schlager than American or British rock. Jazz bands like Blue Sun, Burnin Red Ivanhoe, Secret Oyster and Maxwells also moved towards rock. At the close of the decade, much of the rock world was incorporating sociopolitical lyrics, along with the rise of the counterculture. Denmark's contribution to this field included Gasolin, Gnags, Jomfru Ane Band and Røde Mor.
Among middle-aged and older Danes, schlager-resembling Danish folk rock was gaining popularity those days, chiefly artists like John Mogensen, Otto Brandenburg and Kim Larsen.

By the 1980s, however, pop-rock bands like Sneakers, Anne Linnet, Sebastian and Lis Sørensen were popular, alongside punk-influenced Miss B. Haven, TV-2, Sort Sol and Kliché. Best selling was the cowpunk band, D-A-D, who in the late eighties turned into a Ronnie James Dio inspired Heavy Metal band. The following decade saw the rise of pop bands like Michael Learns to Rock, Safri Duo and Aqua, guitar rock bands like Dizzy Mizz Lizzy, Kashmir and Psyched Up Janis.

The current Danish rock scene is dominated by indie influences in bands such as The Raveonettes, and Mew. Other popular Danish rock groups include Iceage, Sort Sol (Black sun), VETO, Figurines, Kira and The Kindred Spirits, Carpark North, Saybia, Tim Christensen, The Floor Is Made of Lava and the Danish folk metal band Svartsot. Some hard rock bands to come out of Denmark are Volbeat, Red Warszawa, Mercenary, Mercyful Fate (later King Diamond), Artillery, Pretty Maids, Freak of Nature / Mike Tramp (former singer of White Lion) and Royal Hunt. For alternative rock, Cryoshell started out in affiliation with LEGO, gaining it some market. A popular newer Danish band is Nephew, who play a blend of indie and electro rock and utilize a mixture of Danish and English lyrics.

Famous Danish rock musicians are among other Lars Ulrich, the drummer and co-founder of Metallica, and Mike Tramp, the vocalist and co-songwriter of White Lion.

More extreme Danish metal bands include Mnemic, Illdisposed, Illnath, Corpus Mortale, Panzerchrist, Konkhra, Hatesphere, Marodium, Nortt and Iniquity.

== Festivals ==
The annual Roskilde Festival is held in Danish city of Roskilde. The festival is the second-largest in Europe with ticket sales normally running from 70,000 to 100,000. The festival has featured many prominent artists (mainly rock), such as Nirvana, Guns N' Roses, U2, Bob Dylan, Black Sabbath and Green Day, and there has also been an emphasis on world music, alternative genres and Danish music at the festival. In 2000, the festival suffered a terrible accident during a Pearl Jam concert where 9 people were crushed by the wild crowds, making security a primary issue of the following festivals. The festival has since avoided any other incidents of this kind.
