= Pe'ahi II =

Studio album by the Raveonettes
- Released: 25 April 2025
- Genre: Shoegaze, noise pop, post-punk revival, surf rock
- Length: 31:10
- Label: Beat Dies Records
- Producer: Sune Rose Wagner

The Raveonettes chronology
The Raveonettes Sing... (2024)	Pe'ahi II (2025)

Singles from Pe'ahi II
- 1. "Blackest" Released: 28 February 2025; 2. "Killer" Released: 28 March 2025

Pe'ahi II is the tenth studio album by Danish indie rock duo the Raveonettes, released on 25 April 2025. It was recorded in Nashville, Los Angeles, and Copenhagen.

== Background ==
The album's release date was announced on 28th of March 2025 with the release of the single "KILLER". The release was promoted with the tour across USA, Europe and Asia, tied to the celebratation of 20 years of their second studio album, Pretty In Black.

== Critical reception ==
Professional ratings
Review scores
Source	Rating
PopMatters	9/10
Indie for Bunnies	7.5/10
Gaffa	4/6 stars
Soundvenue	5/6 stars
Benzine Magazine	3.5/5 stars
Pop Fantasma	7.5/10
laut.de	4/5 stars

Live Nation Denmark states that the album continues the thematic thread of the band's 2014 album Pe'ahi, which explores themes of life's fragility, death, longing, and vulnerability. Kerstin Kratochwill of laut.de notes the album deals with existentialist topics such as life and death, pain and longing. Control Club writes that " The Raveonettes’ tenth studio album delivers an anti-narrative in which wounds continue to echo, quieter and deeper with time," describing it not as "a record about what happened, but about what lingers." Alison Ross of PopMatters writes that "Pe'ahi II provides an absolutely essential cathartic sensory overload, in that absolutely inimitable Raveonettes way."

== Track listing ==
No.	Title	Length
1.	"Strange"	5:03
2.	"Blackest"	3:32
3.	"Dissonant"	3:51
4.	"Killer"	5:47
5.	"Lucifer"	3:48
6.	"Speed"	3:22
7.	"Sunday School"	2:49
8.	"Ulrikke"	2:56
