= Robert Lelièvre =

- Robert Lelièvre, autumn 1968

Background information
- Born: Robert Jean Francis Lelièvre; 1 October 1942
- Origin: Le Bourg-d'Oisans, Isère, France
- Died: 26 August 1973 (aged 30)
- Genres: Folk music, folk rock, progressive rock
- Occupations: Musician, singer-songwriter
- Instruments: Guitar, vocals
- Years active: 1965–73
- Labels: Sonet Records, Metronome Records, Marmalade Records, Belter Records
- Formerly of: Cy, Maia & Robert, Iain Campbell, High Crossfield, Pan

Robert Lelièvre (1 October 1942 – 26 August 1973) was a French singer, songwriter and guitar player. He is best remembered as a member of the folk rock trio Cy, Maia & Robert, and for fronting the Danish progressive rock band Pan. Their eponymous debut album is considered amongst the best in the history of Danish rock music.

== Biography ==
=== Early years: 1942–65 ===
Robert Jean Francis Lelièvre was born in Le Bourg-d'Oisans, Isère, France on 1 October 1942. In January 1962, after three months of military service he deserted the French Army and fled the country. He first went to Spain, where he played the guitar in a local jazz band. After three years of traveling around Europe, he settled in Copenhagen, Denmark in 1965. Here, he met Danish singer and accordion player Maia Aarskov and English guitar player and singer Cy Nicklin, and they joined forces in the folk rock trio Cy, Maia & Robert.

=== Folk rock in Cy, Maia & Robert: 1965–67 ===
Cy, Maia & Robert's first release was an album entitled On the Scene in 1966. It contained one original song (written by Lelièvre), and amongst other cover songs a version of Paul Simon's "A Church Is Burning", whom the trio met and played with during his tour around the Danish folk circuit in 1965. The album was well received by the Danish music press who admired the trio for their high technical musicianship. The trio's second album Out of Our Times came out the following year, 1967. This time it consisted of all original material, with the music written by Lelièvre and the words by Paul Secon. Another critical success in Denmark, the reputation of Out of Our Times reached England, and the trio was invited to London to re-record "I'm on My Way" as a "business card" to bigger markets. There were plans of a US release and an appearance on English TV, but bad advice and amateurish management delayed these plans. In the meantime, the musicians had internal disagreements on the musical direction, and when in November 1967 they had all their musical equipment stolen, the trio of Cy, Maia & Robert split up during the height of their success. The fact that their records did not sell as well as hoped for also added to their problems.

=== Three recordings with three Campbells: 1967–68 ===
While still in Cy, Maia & Robert, Lelièvre and Nicklin accompanied Scottish folk singer Alex Campbell on the live album Alex Campbell at the Tivoli Gardens, recorded in 1967 at Tivoli Gardens in Copenhagen.

During March and April 1968, still in Copenhagen, Lelièvre played with drummer James "Jimmy" Campbell and bass player Iain Campbell in the short lived trio Full Limit. Fronted by Maia Aarskov they released a single, "Cheers Dears" / "Natural Man", on Metronome Records as Maia & Full Limit.

Hereafter Lelièvre proceeded to record a nearly-acoustic album of songs with Iain Campbell, whom he had met and befriended the previous year. The album Alliance was released in October the same year under the name Robert & Iain. The six songs penned by Lelièvre contain lyrics entirely in French, and five of them were recorded by him alone, with just an acoustic guitar.

=== London, solo project and High Crossfield: 1969 ===
In November 1968 Lelièvre met Julie Driscoll and her manager Giorgio Gomelsky who invited him to travel to London in January. However, in December he received an invitation from Paul McCartney to record an album for the newly established Apple Records. Consequently, Lelièvre went to London in December 1968, but the deal with Apple never materialised. Instead he signed a contract as songwriter and studio musician for Gomelskys rising record company, Marmalade Records. With the participation of—amongst others—John McLaughlin and Brian Auger, he recorded a number of songs at London's Advision studio destined for a future solo album. For reasons remaining unclear, the solo album was never released but two of the songs—"Dis-toi-bien" and "J'ai vu ton visage"—came out on a single in France on Marmalade Records under the name Lélievre. "Dis-toi-bien" also appeared on Marmalade's 1969 sampler compilation Marmalade 100 Proof. This album was released shortly before the label folded and Lelièvre consequently terminated from his contract.

Lelièvre returned to Denmark in June 1969 where he re-established work with old friend Cy Nicklin in a new band, High Crossfield. This band existed only a few months, but managed to appear on both Danish national radio and TV although they never recorded in the studio.

=== Progressive rock in Pan: 1970 ===
In October 1969, Lelièvre and High Crossfield bass player Arne Würgler formed what was to become Lélievre's most notable musical constellation: The progressive rock band Pan. Lelièvre and Würgler enrolled four other Danish musicians: Brothers Thomas and Michael Puggaard-Müller (guitar and drums), jazz-organist Henning Verner (who previously had performed with Dexter Gordon), as well as singer and lyricist Niels Skousen who initially shared the vocals with Lelièvre but left Pan already in January 1970. Pan released their first single "In a Simple Way" / "Right Across My Bed" in January that year, followed by their eponymous titled debut album in May. All music and words on this album are written by Lelièvre, with two songs in French and the rest in English, and the arrangements and production are tight in order to fit the sophisticated blend of rock, blues, folk, jazz and even small drops of classic. At the time of its release, Pan was hailed by the Danish press, and Dagbladet Information even named it "the best Danish rock album released so far". With time the album has gained status as one of Danish rock history's classic albums. It is listed as the fourth best Danish rock album of the 1970s in Politikens Dansk Rock, the reputed encyclopedia of Danish rock music.

Pan was very much in the public eye in 1970. They played numerous concerts and festivals in Denmark and Germany and featured in two Danish radio broadcasts and one national television show. The two radio broadcasts were recorded and released on CD in 2004 by Danish label Karma Music under the title Pan on the Air – Danish Radio Sessions 1970. They also wrote 20 minutes of instrumental music to the Swedish film Deadline and played the roles of a touring band in the film. However, despite the success on stage and in the media, the Pan album did not sell well, and the band slowly disintegrated during the late autumn of 1970.

=== Second solo project, imprisonment and death: 1971–73 ===
After Pan disbanded, Robert Lelièvre recorded a solo album in 1971 with some of the members of Pan and other Danish musicians. On this album all songs except one had French lyrics. The album was subsequently judged too uncommercial by the record company, Sonet Records, and remains unreleased to this day.

Under the threat of imprisonment as deserter from the army, Lelièvre had since his departure in 1962 never returned to his native France. Nevertheless, in interviews he often expressed that he was longing for home: "How much I wish I can see my motherland again. I miss France, especially at this time of the year. Please, do not understand me that I do not like Denmark. It is just a thought – to walk on the streets in the place where people speak the same language as myself." So when the French government in 1972 issued an amnesty he went home to fulfill his dream. Despite the amnesty Lelièvre was shipped off to a French prison.

Upon his release, Lélievre returned to Denmark, where times got even more difficult. Haunted by inner demons and frustrated with the music business he took his own life on 26 August 1973 in Copenhagen. "An ignorant world lost one of the most talented songwriters of his generation", wrote Norwegian author Dag Erik Asbjørnsen 30 years later in his book Scented Gardens of Mind: A Comprehensive Guide to the Golden Era of Progressive Rock (1968–1980).

== Discography ==
=== Albums ===
- On the Scene (1966) by Cy, Maia & Robert – Sonet Records (SLPS 1220)
- Out of Our Times (1967) by Cy, Maia & Robert – Sonet Records (SLPS 1240)
- Alex Campbell at the Tivoli Gardens (1967) by Alex Campbell – Storyville Records (671207)
- Alliance (1968) by Robert & Iain – Metronome Records (BP 7707)
- Pan (1970) by Pan – Sonet Records (SLPS 1518)
- Pan on the Air – Danish Radio Sessions 1970 (2004) by Pan – Karma Music (KMCD 28114)

=== Singles ===
- "A Church Is Burning" / "Take a Look Inside" (1966) by Cy, Maia & Robert – Sonet Records (T 7223)
- "Green Rocky Road" / "Harvest of Hate" (1966) by Cy, Maia & Robert – Sonet Records (T 7238)
- "Cheers Dears" / "Natural Man" (1968) by Maia & Full Limit – Metronome Records (B 1700)
- "Demain" / "Glass Fibre Road" (1968) by Robert & Iain – Belter Records (07-762)
- "Dis-toi-bien" / "J'ai vu ton visage" (1969) by Lelièvre – Marmalade Records (421 457)
- "In a Simple Way" / "Right Across My Bed" (1970) by Pan – Sonet Records (T 7258)
