= Into the Night (EP) =

EP by The Raveonettes
- Released: 24 April 2012
- Recorded: 2012
- Genre: Indie rock, shoegaze, noise pop, post-punk revival
- Length: 12:34
- Label: The Orchard
- Producer: Sune Rose Wagner, Richard Gottehrer

The Raveonettes chronology
Rarities/B-Sides (2011)	Into the Night (2012)	Observator (2012)

Professional ratings
Aggregate scores
Source	Rating
Metacritic	(72/100)
Review scores
Source	Rating
Allmusic	3.5/5 stars
Consequence of Sound	2.5/5 stars
Drowned in Sound	4/5 stars
Popmatters	8/10 stars

Into the Night is the fifth EP by The Raveonettes and was released on 24 April 2012. This is the third release co-produced by Richard Gottehrer and the first since Pretty in Black released in 2005. Singer Sune Rose Wagner describes the EP as "a delightfully damaged ode to the letdowns of lost love."

== Reception ==
The EP received generally positive reviews upon its release. At Metacritic, which assigns a normalised rating out of 100 to reviews from mainstream critics, the EP received an average score of 72, based on four reviews, which indicates "Generally favorable reviews".

== Track listing ==
All tracks are written by Sune Rose Wagner.

No.	Title	Length
1.	"Into the Night"	3:45
2.	"Night Comes Out"	3:21
3.	"Too Close to Heartbreak"	2:56
4.	"Bad Ghosts"	2:33
Total length:		12:34

== Release history ==
Country	Date	Format	Label
Canada	24 April 2012	CD, digital download, double 7"	The Orchard
United States	24 April 2012	CD, digital download, double 7"	The Orchard
