= Søren Solkær =

Danish photographer

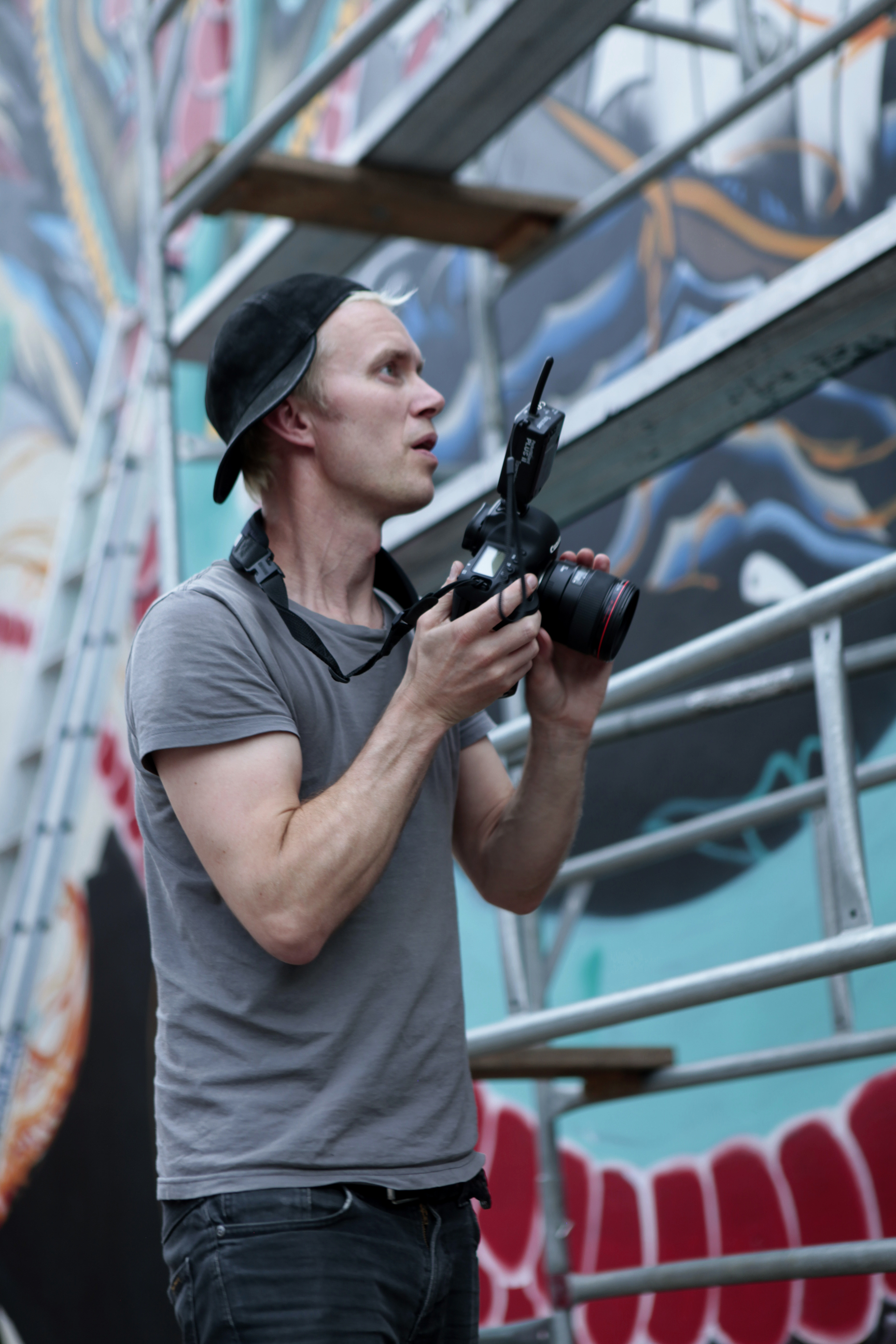
Søren Solkær on photo shoot with Australian street artist Meggs, Melbourne, November 2012

Søren Solkær (born 3 September 1969 and formerly known as Søren Solkær Starbird) is a Danish photographer best known for his portraits of musicians. He is most recognised as the man responsible for various iconic images of Björk, The White Stripes, Franz Ferdinand, David Lynch, Arctic Monkeys, R.E.M. and U2.

== Early life ==
He was born in Sønderborg, Denmark. He completed a B.A. in Nordic Literature at Århus University, then later a B.A. in Photography at the Film and TV School of the Academy of Performing Arts in Prague (FAMU) in the Czech Republic. He established a studio in Copenhagen in 1996. When he married in 2001 took the surname Starbird from his American wife. After the marriage ended, Søren reverted to his birth name Søren Solkær.

== Career ==
In the beginning of his artistic career, Søren teamed up with Sune Rose Wagner of The Raveonettes on various projects, with Sune at one point accompanying him as his assistant on shoots. Søren was responsible for the strong visual tone of The Raveonettes from the early stages of their career, and he also made his music video directorial debut with "Beat City" – the second single released from The Raveonettes' Whip It On (2002) album. His collaboration with the band during the 1990s and 2000s marked his entry into the Danish music scene as a photographer of musicians.

Concurrent to his work with musicians, Solkær furthered his specialisation in portraits by undertaking an eight-year project. Photographers Posed comprised 45 photographers from 15 countries, including Arnold Newman, Duane Michals, Pierre et Gilles, Anton Corbijn, Jan Saudek and Jeanloup Sieff. The collection featured Solkær's portrayals of the style associated with each of his subjects and was exhibited in galleries in Chicago, Copenhagen, Cologne, Prague and Odense.

Solkær was contributing photographer for Q Magazine, Rolling Stone and GQ. As a result, he toured with Franz Ferdinand in Russia, Metallica in Portugal and Oasis in Argentina. He has also moved into the world of cinema, photographing James Franco, Danny Boyle, Tim Burton, David Lynch and John Waters. In addition, he has taken pictures for EKKO, Gaffa and Soundvenue.

He has been commissioned by Universal, Sony and EMI to photograph individual artists and groups, including Metallica, The White Stripes, Primal Scream, Mark Ronson, Kasabian, Tom Jones, Regina Spektor, Stereophonics, Vampire Weekend and Led Zeppelin.

In addition to his work with celebrities, between 1999 and 2009, Solkær photographed thousands of practitioners of Raja yoga meditation in Rajasthan, India. In 2009 he portrayed a large delegation of spiritual leaders at the UN Cop 15 Summit in Copenhagen. At Roskilde Festival in 2009 he built a studio in a shipping container and for 6 days, took photos of festivalgoers.

== Works ==
Solkær has released five photography books. Beat City (2006) documents his earlier work with musicians juxtaposed with cinematic city scapes from across the world whilst his followup, CLOSER (2011), is a hard-cover coffee table book containing 238 pages of portraits of musicians.

In late 2011, Solkær released his third book, Souls. Souls features portraits of meditating yogis taken on the top of Mount Abu, Rajasthan, India – the result of Solkær's seven journeys to the region. The project has been exhibited in New York, Oxford, Copenhagen, Milan, Naples, Bratislava and Reykjavík.

Solkær's fourth book, SURFACE, with portraits of street artists and graffiti writers, was released by Gingko Press in 2015. His fifth book, Portraits 1993-2018 was released in 2018.

The CLOSER exhibition in Øksnehallen, Copenhagen was noteworthy for its scale – occupying over 24,000 square feet of exhibition space and featuring 327 images in formats up to 3x4.5 meters. The exhibition was largely praised by the Danish media and received a 'six out of six' rating from Politiken and was subsequently nominated for best Cultural Event 2009 by AOK.

Notably, Solkær's images are featured in the cover art for Franz Ferdinand's 2009 album Tonight: Franz Ferdinand as well as Stereophonics' seventh studio album Keep Calm and Carry On.

Solkær's works are also featured as part of the permanent collection in the Royal Danish Library and The National Portrait Collection in Frederiksborg Castle, Denmark.

== Selected solo exhibitions ==
- 2019: BLACK SUN, Minä Perhonen Galleria, Kyoto Japan
- 2018: SURFACE, Museum of Urban Contemporary Art, Munich
- 2018: BLACK SUN, Sage Gallery, Los Angeles
- 2018: 25 year portrait retrospective, The National Portrait Gallery, Frederiksborg Castle, Denmark
- 2017: SURFACE, UTZON CENTER, Aalborg, Denmark
- 2017: CLOSER, Martin Asbæk Gallery
- 2016: SURFACE, Vroom&Varossieau Gallery, Amsterdam, Holland
- 2015: SURFACE, Øksnehallen, Copenhagen, Denmark
- 2015: SURFACE, The Burrard Arts Center, Vancouver, Canada
- 2015: SURFACE, Allouche Gallery, New York, USA
- 2015: SURFACE, Art Equity, Sydney, Australia
- 2015: SURFACE, Subliminal Projects, Los Angeles, USA
- 2015: SURFACE, NKN Gallery, Melbourne, Australia
- 2015: SURFACE, Art Equity, Sydney, Australia
- 2014: Face to Face, Kistefos Museum, Norway
- 2013: Face to Face, Trapholt Museum, Kolding, Denmark
- 2012: CLOSER. Art Equity, Sydney, Australia
- 2012: CLOSER. The Danish Cultural Institute, Edinburgh, Scotland
- 2011: CLOSER. Halvandet, Copenhagen, Denmark
- 2011: CLOSER. Gibson Gallery, London, U.K.
- 2010: CLOSER. Spazio Lattuada, Milan, Italy
- 2009: CLOSER. Øksnehallen, Copenhagen, Denmark
- 2008: Souls. Mazzotta Art Selection/eg22, Milan, Italy
- 2007: Souls. Inner Space, Oxford, England
- 2006: Beat City. Horsens Kunstmuseum, Denmark
- 2006: Beat City. Århus Kunstbygning, Denmark
- 2005: Beat City. Fotografisk Center, Copenhagen, Denmark
- 2005: Souls. Reykjavík Town Hall Gallery, Iceland
- 2004: Souls. Month of Photography, Bratislava, Slovakia.
- 2004: Souls. Øksnehallen, Copenhagen, Denmark
- 2004: Metropol. Vega, Copenhagen, Denmark.
- 2003: Third Eye. IN CAMERA Gallery, Chelsea, New York
- 1998: Photographers Posed. Schneider Gallery, Chicago, USA
- 1998: Photographers Posed. Brandts Klædefabrik, Odense, Denmark
- 1997: Photographers Posed. Fotokina, Cologne, Germany
- 1996: Photographers Posed. Frederiks Bastion, Copenhagen, Denmark
- 1995: Photographers Posed. Galleri Radost FX, Prague, Czech Republic

== Inspirations and style ==
Solkær's photography is characterised by finding a tension point between intimacy and edginess. His portraits are often regarded as cinematic in tone with a distinctive colour palette. He cites the inspirations for his style as ranging from filmmakers David Lynch and Wong Kar-Wai through to the works of photographer Philip-Lorca diCorcia and painter Caspar David Friedrich.

== Critical reception ==
Michael Stipe of R.E.M. commented that "Søren has a great understanding of light, and a rare eye for beauty and portraiture," while Alex Kapranos of Franz Ferdinand said that "working with Søren, nothing feels invasive or exploitative. You trust him and you forget about his lens. It becomes invisible. It makes him the photographer he is - not just how he responds to his light meter, sets his aperture or chooses a composition, but how he can capture what makes us the humans we are." Ricky Wilson of Kaiser Chiefs once jokingly remarked "anyone who can keep five uninterested grown men in coats from Leeds in his view-finder for more than five seconds, must be some kind of a genius."
