= Aphaca =

Aphaca may refer to:

- Aphaca, Danish pop group
- Aphaca, a genus of plants now considered a synonym of Lathyrus
- Lathyrus aphaca, a pea of family Fabaceae
- Afqa, a municipality in Lebanon
