= In and Out of Control =

Studio album by The Raveonettes
- Released: 6 October 2009
- Recorded: 2009
- Genre: Indie rock, shoegaze, noise pop, post-punk revival
- Length: 43:56
- Label: Fierce Panda Records; Vice Records
- Producer: Sune Rose Wagner; Thomas Troelsen

The Raveonettes chronology
Wishing You a Rave Christmas (2008)	In and Out of Control (2009)	Raven in the Grave (2011)

Singles from In and Out of Control
- 1. "Bang!" Released: 19 October 2009; 2. "Last Dance" Released: 19 October 2009; 3. "Heart of Stone" Released: 6 April 2010; 4. "Gone Forever" Released: Promo only

In and Out of Control is the fourth studio album by The Raveonettes, and was released on 6 October 2009.

== Reception ==
Professional ratings
Aggregate scores
Source	Rating
Metacritic	74/100
Review scores
Source	Rating
AllMusic	3.5/5 stars
Alternative Press	4/5 stars
CHARTattack	3/5 stars
Drowned In Sound	7/10
The Guardian	4/5 stars
NU.nl	7/10 stars
Pitchfork Media	6.9/10
PopMatters	7/10 stars
Spin	3/5 stars

The album received generally positive reviews upon its release. At Metacritic, which assigns a normalised rating out of 100 to reviews from mainstream critics, the album received an average score of 74, based on 16 reviews.

== Track listing ==
No.	Title	Writer(s)	Length
1.	"Bang!"	Sune Rose Wagner, Thomas Troelsen	2:54
2.	"Gone Forever"	Wagner, Troelsen	3:36
3.	"Last Dance"	Wagner, Troelsen	3:47
4.	"Boys Who Rape (Should All Be Destroyed)"	Wagner, Troelsen	3:04
5.	"Heart of Stone"	Wagner	3:55
6.	"Oh, I Buried You Today"	Wagner	1:22
7.	"Suicide"	Wagner, Troelsen	3:13
8.	"D.R.U.G.S."	Wagner, Troelsen	4:30
9.	"Breaking into Cars"	Wagner, Troelsen	3:08
10.	"Break Up Girls!"	Wagner	4:00
11.	"Wine"	Wagner	3:41

iTunes bonus material
No.	Title	Length
12.	"Echoes"	3:27
13.	"Chelsea Sessions" (video)	16:13

Record Store Day bonus CD
No.	Title	Length
1.	"The Chosen One"	3:20
2.	"Planes Do Crash"	2:31

== Singles ==
1. Last Dance/Bang!: The first single from In and Out of Control is a double A-side of Last Dance and Bang! released on a 7" vinyl limited to 1,000. The video for Last Dance was directed by Matthew Lessner.
2. Heart of Stone: Released as a single with an accompanying video directed by Chris Do.
3. Gone Forever: Released as a promo single with an accompanying video directed by Nuka Wølk.
