= Raven in the Grave =

Studio album by The Raveonettes
- Released: 4 April 2011
- Recorded: 2010
- Genre: Indie rock, shoegaze, noise pop, post-punk revival
- Length: 35:42
- Label: Vice Records
- Producer: The Raveonettes

The Raveonettes chronology
In and Out of Control (2009)	Raven in the Grave (2011)	Rarities/B-Sides (2011)

Singles from Raven in the Grave
- 1. "Recharge and Revolt" Released: 7 March 2011; 2. "Apparitions" Released: 31 May 2011; 3. "Let Me on Out" Released: 15 November 2011

Raven in the Grave is the fifth studio album by The Raveonettes, and was released on 4 April 2011. Several of the songs included on the album are English re-recordings of songs found on Wagner's solo album.

== Reception ==
Professional ratings
Aggregate scores
Source	Rating
Metacritic	66/100
Review scores
Source	Rating
AllMusic	4/5 stars
Pitchfork	5.7/10
Slant Magazine	1.5/5 stars
Spin	7/10 stars

The album received generally positive reviews upon its release. At Metacritic, which assigns a normalised rating out of 100 to reviews from mainstream critics, the album received an average score of 66, based on 18 reviews, which indicates "Generally favorable reviews".

Since its release, Sune Rose Wagner has expressed disappointment with the album, stating it would have worked better as a soundtrack and that the song structures are "quite unusual compared to everything else [The Raveonettes have] done".

== Track listing ==
All tracks are written by Sune Rose Wagner.

No.	Title	Length
1.	"Recharge & Revolt"	5:23
2.	"War in Heaven"	4:42
3.	"Forget That You're Young"	3:57
4.	"Apparitions"	3:55
5.	"Summer Moon"	3:04
6.	"Let Me on Out"	2:36
7.	"Ignite"	3:05
8.	"Evil Seeds"	4:17
9.	"My Time's Up"	4:43

Amazon.com bonus track
No.	Title	Length
10.	"No Joy"	3:51

iTunes bonus track
No.	Title	Length
10.	"As You Lay Asleep"	3:18

Super Deluxe Edition bonus track
No.	Title	Length
10.	"Sun Goes Down"	2:56
