= Sometimes They Drop By =

EP by The Raveonettes
- Released: 23 September 2008
- Recorded: 2008
- Genre: Indie rock, shoegaze, noise pop, post-punk revival
- Length: 13:38
- Label: Vice Records
- Producer: The Raveonettes

The Raveonettes chronology
Lust Lust Lust (2007)	Sometimes They Drop By (2008)	Beauty Dies (2008)

Sometimes They Drop By is the second EP by The Raveonettes, and was released on 23 September 2008. It is the first release in a three-part release of digital download EPs over three months.

== Track listing ==
All tracks are written by Sune Rose Wagner

No.	Title	Length
1.	"Way Out There"	2:51
2.	"Blood Red Leis"	3:22
3.	"Sometimes They Drop By"	3:32
4.	"Vintage Future"	3:56
Total length:		13:38
