= Beauty Dies =

EP by The Raveonettes
- Released: 21 October 2008
- Recorded: 2008
- Genre: Indie rock, shoegaze, noise pop, post-punk revival
- Length: 13:42
- Label: Vice Records
- Producer: The Raveonettes

The Raveonettes chronology
Sometimes They Drop By (2008)	Beauty Dies (2008)	Wishing You a Rave Christmas (2008)

Singles from Beauty Dies
- 1. "Black/White" Released: 17 November 2008

Professional ratings
Review scores
Source	Rating
Drowned In Sound	Positive
Pitchfork Media	7.0/10

Beauty Dies is the third EP by The Raveonettes, and was released on 21 October 2008. It is a second release in a three-part release of digital download EPs over three months.

== Track listing ==
All tracks are written by Sune Rose Wagner

No.	Title	Length
1.	"Young and Beautiful"	3:06
2.	"Black/White"	3:37
3.	"The Thief"	2:49
4.	"Here Comes the End"	4:11
Total length:		13:42
