= Vild ungdom =

2026 studio album by Aphaca

Studio album by Aphaca
- Released: 27 February 2026
- Studios: Sauna Studios; Farvemøllen; Gula Studion
- Genre: Indie pop
- Length: 40:53
- Labels: Baghuset; Universal Music Denmark
- Producer: Adi Zukanovic

Aphaca chronology
Et aar uden dig (2022)	Vild ungdom (2026)

Vild ungdom (transl. Wild youth, stylised in all caps) is the second studio album by the Danish indie pop band Aphaca. The album was released on 27 February 2026 by Baghuset, under the Universal Music Denmark label.

== Release and reception ==
Aphaca announced their newest album via Instagram on 27 January 2026, with a release date set for 27 February. The band was planning the album since 2024, before their breakthrough on the Danish music scene. "En drøm om et menneske", the lead single from the album, had previously been released on 9 May 2025 and had gone on to achieve double-platinum certification before the album's release, as well as sitting at number one on the Hitlisten charts for multiple weeks.

Vild ungdom released on 27 February 2026. Upon release, the album received generally positive reviews from Danish music critics. GAFFA and Politiken both gave the album five-out-of-six stars in their resepctive reviews. Soundvenue writer Anton Løkke Laursen noted the band's playful and youthful style, while maintaining a focus on community and bonds that hold people together. Gaffa complimented the band's strength in songwriting and overall sound.

With its debut on the Hitlisten charts 11 March, the album reached number one. Two songs from the album, "Flue i et spind" and "Hvor kommer vi fra", also debuted on the singles chart at number one and number three respectively.

== Accolades ==
As the lead single from Vild ungdom, "En drøm om et menneske" was nominated for several awards. The song was first nominated as DR P3's "Listener Hit" at their annual awards show, P3 Guld, where it won the award. The song was later nominated at the GAFFA Awards in March 2026, winning Single of the Year for 2025.

Year	Award	Category	Recipient(s)	Result	Ref.
2025	P3 Guld	Listener Hit	"En drøm om et menneske"	Won	
2026	GAFFA Awards	Single of the Year	"En drøm om et menneske"	Won	

== Track listing ==
No.	Title	Lyrics	Producer(s)	Length
1.	"Flue i et spind"	Rumle Hueg Kærså	Adi Zukanovic	3:44
2.	"Hvor kommer vi fra"	Kærså	Zukanovic	3:56
3.	"En drøm om et menneske"	Kærså	Zukanovic	2:58
4.	"Himmelskib"	Kærså	Zukanovic	4:25
5.	"Dagen er gåe"	Kærså	Zukanovic	3:03
6.	"Flyver som fugle"	Kærså	Zukanovic	3:56
7.	"Et sted hvor vi de første"	Kærså	Zukanovic	3:27
8.	"Venner der vokser"	Kærså	Zukanovic	1:35
9.	"Sidste llys"	Kærså	Zukanovic	3:51
10.	"Hold om mig"	Kærså	Zukanovic	4:53
11.	"Vi pumper hjertet op"	Kærså	Zukanovic	5:05
Total length:				40:53

== Charts ==
Weekly chart performance
Chart (2026)	Peak position
Danish Albums (Hitlisten)	1

== Certifications ==
Certifications
Region	Certification	Certified units/sales
Denmark (IFPI Danmark)	2× Platinum	40,000^{‡}
^{*} Sales figures based on certification alone.^{‡} Sales+streaming figures based on certification alone.
