= Observator =

Studio album by The Raveonettes
- Released: 11 September 2012
- Recorded: 2012
- Genre: Indie rock, shoegaze, noise pop, post-punk revival
- Length: 31:21
- Label: Vice Records
- Producer: Richard Gottehrer; Sune Rose Wagner

The Raveonettes chronology
Into the Night (2012)	Observator (2012)	Pe'ahi (2014)

Singles from Observator
- 1. "Observations" Released: 25 June 2012; 2. "She Owns the Streets" Released: 9 July 2012

Observator is the sixth studio album by The Raveonettes, and was released on 11 September 2012.

== Background ==
Singer Sune Rose Wagner traveled to Venice Beach to gather inspiration for a new album. He ended up going on three-day drug and alcohol bender due to depression he was suffering because of back injury. Songs on the album are inspired by observations of the people he met during this time. The album was recorded in two to three weeks at Sunset Sound Recorders in Los Angeles because of Wagner's desire to record where The Doors "did all their best stuff" and "environment surrounded by all those ghosts of genius".

== Reception ==
Professional ratings
Aggregate scores
Source	Rating
Metacritic	73/100
Review scores
Source	Rating
AllMusic	4/5 stars
The A.V. Club	B
Consequence of Sound	3/5 stars
Rolling Stone	3/5 stars

The album received generally positive reviews upon its release. At Metacritic, which assigns a normalised rating out of 100 to reviews from mainstream critics, the album received an average score of 73, based on 17 reviews, which indicates "Generally favorable reviews".

== Track listing ==
All tracks are written by Sune Rose Wagner.

No.	Title	Length
1.	"Young and Cold"	3:21
2.	"Observations"	4:30
3.	"Curse the Night"	3:21
4.	"The Enemy"	3:40
5.	"Sinking With the Sun"	3:31
6.	"She Owns the Streets"	3:02
7.	"Downtown"	2:49
8.	"You Hit Me (I'm Down)"	3:45
9.	"Till the End"	3:22

iTunes bonus track
No.	Title	Length
10.	"A Perfect Place"	2:47

iTunes North American bonus material
No.	Title	Length
11.	"She Owns the Streets" (video)	3:06

== Release history ==
Country	Date	Format	Label
Canada	11 September 2012	CD, digital download, LP record	Vice Records
United States	11 September 2012	CD, digital download, LP record	Vice Records
United Kingdom	17 September 2012	CD, digital download, LP record	The Orchard/The Beat Dies
