= Sharin Foo =

Danish musician and singer (born 1973)

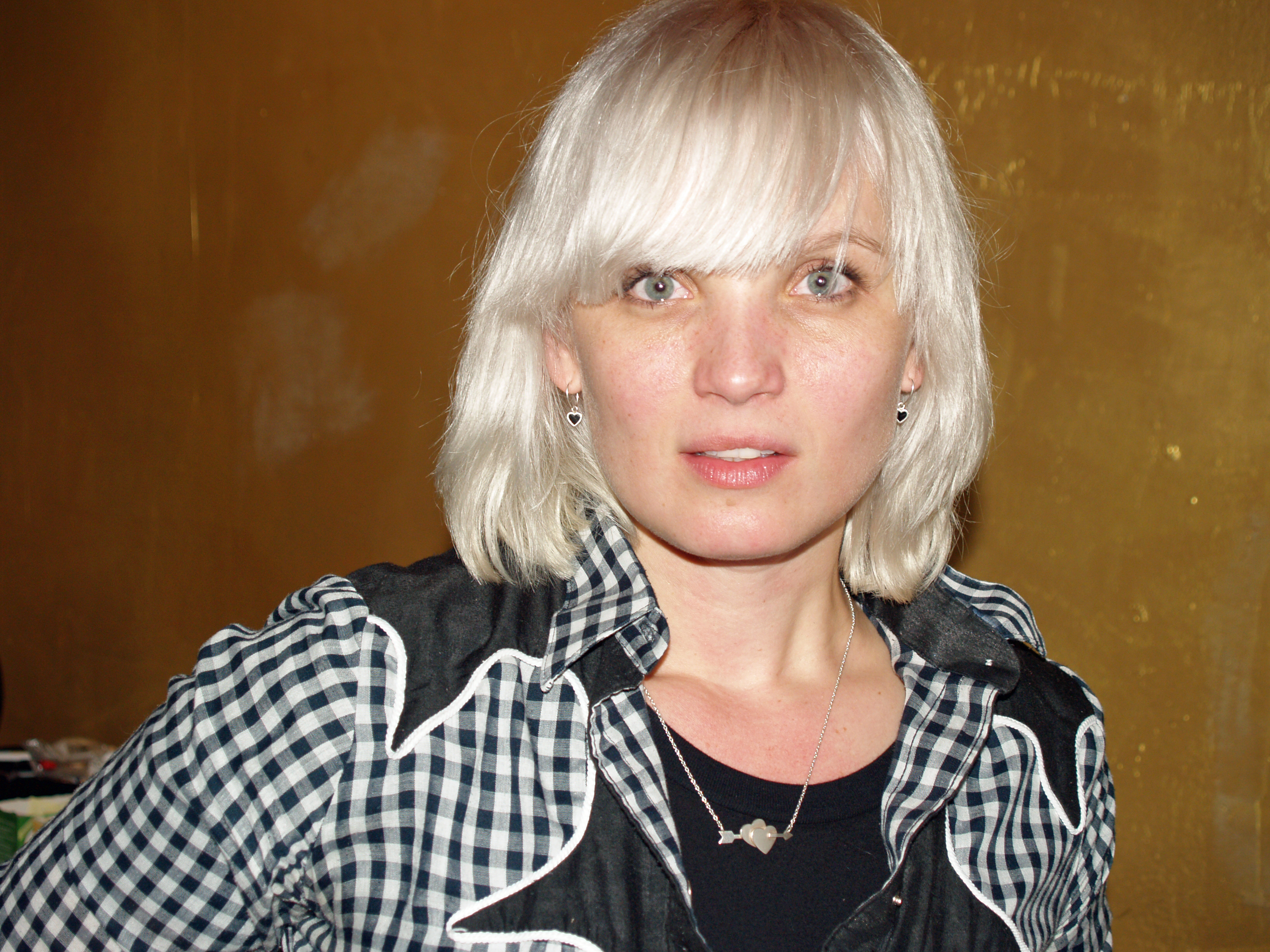
- Sharin Foo in 2007

Background information
- Born: 22 November 1973 (age 52); Emmelev, Djursland, Denmark
- Instruments: Bass; guitar; vocals

Sharin Foo (born 22 November 1973) is a Danish musician and singer in the rock group The Raveonettes.

== Early life ==
Foo was born in Emmelev, Djursland, Denmark, on 11 November 1973. She was raised in a hippy commune.

Foo's father is musician Kim Tai Foo, a second-generation Danish-Chinese who played in the Danish folk-rock band Djursland Spillemænd.

At an early age, Foo spent time in India studying the musical traditions of dhrupad and qawwali.

== Career ==
When Foo returned to Denmark, she got involved in the local punk scene and met Sune Rose Wagner in Copenhagen in 2001. They formed The Raveonettes and recorded their debut album, the EP Whip It On, in 2002 for the Crunchy Frog label, of Denmark.

Rolling Stone editor David Fricke's positive review of their performance at the 2002 Spot music festival held in Denmark resulted in a number of offers from major recording labels. They signed with Sony Records and released their first full-length album, Chain Gang of Love, on the Columbia label, in 2003. The group, since its inception, has been touring constantly, in various line-ups around Wagner & Foo.

== Personal life ==
Foo married in 2007 musician and songwriter Greg Edwards, of the experimental rock band Autolux. They have one daughter, Molly Foo Edwards, born on 13 September 2008. The couple separated in February 2015 and divorced in August of the same year.

Foo's sister, Louise, is also a musician and singer who has been in the group Giana Factory, and the collective Ohmarymary. Louise Foo toured with The Raveonettes in the summer of 2008, replacing for some dates her sister who had to avoid stage work in order to better conclude her pregnancy, on doctor's orders.

In 2011, Sharin Foo acted as judge in the Danish TV talent show Danmarks største stemme ("Denmark's Greatest Voice"). In 2012, along with graphic designer Camilla Hjerl who's also from Denmark, Foo opened Hurra!, an online shop and blog that "curates and sells a selection of Danish art- and design-objects", which led, in 2013, to a pop-up shop in Venice, California.

In 2015, she competed in the Danish version of Dancing With The Stars along with dancing partner Frederik Nonnemann. Foo subsequently stated that the dancing offered her a "new body-awareness" and she has become "more brave" about her physicality. The dancing couple were voted out halfway through the competition.

Foo lived in Los Angeles, California for 17 years with her daughter, but is now living in Denmark.
