= Lust Lust Lust =

Studio album by The Raveonettes
- Released: 12 November 2007
- Recorded: 2007
- Genre: Indie rock, shoegaze, noise pop, post-punk revival
- Length: 41:03
- Label: Fierce Panda; Vice
- Producer: Sune Rose Wagner

The Raveonettes chronology
Pretty in Black (2005)	Lust Lust Lust (2007)	Sometimes They Drop By (2008)

Singles from Lust Lust Lust
- 1. "Dead Sound" Released: 19 September 2007; 2. "You Want the Candy" Released: 25 February 2008; 3. "Blush" Released: 17 November 2008; 4. "Aly, Walk with Me" Released: Promo Only

Lust Lust Lust is the third studio album by The Raveonettes, released on 12 November 2007 in the UK and on 19 February 2008 in the US, with bonus tracks included. The album was recorded completely by Sharin Foo and Sune Rose Wagner with no studio musicians. The Raveonettes used drum machines instead of real drums, and recorded most bass and non-guitar sounds with keyboards.

The album did not qualify for entry into the UK charts, as both physical formats contained 3D glasses.

== Reception ==
Professional ratings
Aggregate scores
Source	Rating
Metacritic	72/100
Review scores
Source	Rating
AllMusic	4/5 stars
Drowned In Sound	7/10 stars
The Guardian	4/5 stars
NME	8/10 stars
Pitchfork	7.4/10
Rolling Stone	4/5 stars
Spin	4/5 stars
URB	4.5/5 stars

The album received generally positive reviews upon its release. At Metacritic, which assigns a normalised rating out of 100 to reviews from mainstream critics, the album received an average score of 72, based on 29 reviews, which indicates "generally favorable reviews".

Since its release Sune Rose Wagner has stated the album is his favorite Raveonettes' album, stating "I just think [Lust Lust Lust is] our strongest body of work to date. All of the songs are just really good and the sound just sort of melts into each other. It's also super minimal how we recorded it yet so full on at the same time."

== Track listing ==
All tracks are written by Sune Rose Wagner.

No.	Title	Length
1.	"Aly, Walk with Me"	4:58
2.	"Hallucinations"	2:59
3.	"Lust"	3:38
4.	"Dead Sound"	3:33
5.	"Black Satin"	2:39
6.	"Blush"	3:17
7.	"Expelled From Love"	3:15
8.	"You Want the Candy"	3:07
9.	"Blitzed"	3:03
10.	"Sad Transmission"	3:08
11.	"With My Eyes Closed"	2:36
12.	"The Beat Dies"	3:57

Australian bonus tracks
No.	Title	Length
13.	"Honey, I Never Had You"	3:10
14.	"My Heartbeat's Dying"	3:02
15.	"Forever in Your Arms"	2:53

North American bonus tracks
No.	Title	Length
13.	"My Heartbeat's Dying"	3:02
14.	"Honey, I Never Had You"	3:10

North American eMusic bonus tracks
No.	Title	Length
13.	"My Heartbeat's Dying"	3:02
14.	"Honey, I Never Had You"	3:10
15.	"Dead Sound" (Pets On Prozac Remix)	4:23

North American iTunes bonus tracks
No.	Title	Length
13.	"My Heartbeat's Dying"	3:02
14.	"Honey, I Never Had You"	3:10
15.	"Aly, Walk with Me" (Obi Blanche Remix)	3:45

UK Vinyl track listing
No.	Title	Length
1.	"Aly, Walk with Me"	4:58
2.	"Hallucinations"	2:59
3.	"Lust"	3:38
4.	"Dead Sound"	3:33
5.	"Black Satin"	2:39
6.	"Blush"	3:17
7.	"Expelled From Love"	3:15
8.	"My Heartbeat's Dying"	3:02
9.	"You Want the Candy"	3:07
10.	"Blitzed"	3:03
11.	"Sad Transmission"	3:08
12.	"With My Eyes Closed"	2:36
13.	"The Beat Dies"	3:57
