= Pe'ahi (album) =

Studio album by The Raveonettes
- Released: 22 July 2014
- Recorded: 2013–2014
- Genre: Shoegaze, noise pop, post-punk revival
- Length: 36:14
- Label: The Beat Dies
- Producer: The Raveonettes, Justin Meldal-Johnsen

The Raveonettes chronology
| Observator (2012) | Pe'ahi (2014) | 2016 Atomized (2017) |

Singles from Pe'ahi
- 1. "Endless Sleeper" Released: 31 July 2014; 2. "Killer in the Streets" Released: 22 September 2014

Professional ratings
Aggregate scores
| Source | Rating |
|---|---|
| Metacritic | 73/100 |
Review scores
| Source | Rating |
| AllMusic | 4/5 stars |
| MusicOMH | 4/5 stars |

Pe'ahi is the seventh studio album by Danish indie rock duo The Raveonettes, and was released on 22 July 2014. Due to the purposeful lack of promotion or formal announcement of a release date, the album was dubbed a "surprise" release by the band. Pe'ahi received favorable reviews from music critics. The album debuted at number four in their native Denmark, and charted at number 161 on the Billboard 200 in the United States.

== Background ==
After Sune Rose Wagner's father died suddenly in 2013, the band immersed themselves in Southern Californian surf culture. The album was created in early 2014 over four months working 12-hour days and is the first Raveonettes album to include musical elements such as harp and choirs. Lyrically the album deals with tense subject matter such as Sune's near drowning in 2008 ("Endless Sleeper"), his difficult relationship with his father ("Kill!"), his father's death ("Summer Ends"), and infidelity ("Wake Me Up" and "A Hell Below").

The title of the album refers to a popular surfing spot on Maui.

== Track listing ==
All tracks are written by Sune Rose Wagner.

| No. | Title | Length |
|---|---|---|
| 1. | "Endless Sleeper" | 2:55 |
| 2. | "Sisters" | 3:46 |
| 3. | "Killer in the Streets" | 4:00 |
| 4. | "Wake Me Up" | 2:41 |
| 5. | "Z-Boys" | 4:42 |
| 6. | "A Hell Below" | 3:27 |
| 7. | "The Rains of May" | 3:48 |
| 8. | "Kill!" | 3:32 |
| 9. | "When Night Is Almost Done" | 3:23 |
| 10. | "Summer Ends" | 4:07 |

== Charts ==
| Chart (2014) | Peak position |
|---|---|
| Belgian Albums (Ultratop Flanders) | 169 |
| Danish Albums (Hitlisten) | 4 |
| US Billboard 200 | 161 |
| US Independent Albums (Billboard) | 36 |

== Release history ==
| Country | Date | Format | Label |
|---|---|---|---|
| Worldwide | 22 July 2014 | CD, digital download, LP record, Deluxe LP | The Beat Dies |
