= Wishing You a Rave Christmas =

EP by The Raveonettes
- Released: 25 November 2008
- Recorded: 2008
- Genre: Indie rock, shoegaze, noise pop, post-punk revival, Christmas music
- Length: 18:35
- Label: Vice Records
- Producer: The Raveonettes

The Raveonettes chronology
Beauty Dies (2008)	Wishing You a Rave Christmas (2008)	In and Out of Control (2009)

Professional ratings
Review scores
Source	Rating
Pitchfork Media	7.0/10

Wishing You a Rave Christmas is the fourth EP by The Raveonettes, and was released on 25 November 2008. It is the third release in a three-part release of digital download EPs over three months. For reasons unknown, the previously released single The Christmas Song is not included in this collection.

== Track listing ==
All tracks are written by Sune Rose Wagner, except where noted

No.	Title	Writer(s)	Length
1.	"Christmas (Baby Please Come Home)"	Darlene Love	4:26
2.	"Come On Santa"		3:42
3.	"Christmas Ghosts"		5:26
4.	"Christmas in Cleveland"		5:04
Total length:			18:35
