= Alrune Rod =

Danish rock band

- Origin: Copenhagen, Denmark
- Genres: Progressive rock, psychedelic rock, space rock, art rock
- Years active: 1968–2010
- Labels: Sonet, Universal Music, Shadoks, Mandragora, Karma
- Past members: Leif Roden Nielsen; Flemming Giese Rasmussen; Kurt "Pastor" Ziegler Simonsen; Claus From; Ole Poulsen; Tom Lundén; Karsten Høst; Mikael Miller; Jesper Nehammer; Torben Andersen

Alrune Rod (formed 1968) was a Danish psychedelic rock band.

Alrune Rod appeared in the 1971 concert film Skæve Dage I Thy. The film whose title loosely translates as Stoned Days in Thy documents Thylejren, the first rock music festival in Denmark which took place in Thy in 1970. Alrune Rod played at the festival, sometimes called the Danish Woodstock, alongside contemporaries in the Danish music scene at the time to an audience of 30,000.

Rock musician and musicologist Julian Cope has described their first two albums as:

"sounding somewhere between early Pink Floyd, an emptier Arthur Brown’s Kingdom Come, and PAWN HEARTS-period Van Der Graaf Generator"

== Band members ==
Original band members

- Leif Roden (Nielsen), vocals, bass and guitar, kompositioner
- Flemming "Giese" Rasmussen, guitar, vocals, kompositioner
- Kurt "Pastor" Ziegler Simonsen, organ, piano, kompositioner
- Claus From, drums

- Leif Roden (b 3 March 1948, d 3 May 2010) in Copenhagen (vocals, electric bass, guitar, lyrics, composition)
- Ole Poulsen (b 20 December 1950) in Copenhagen (electric guitar, guitar, vocals, mandolin, lyrics, composition)
- Tom Lunden (b 16 March 1950) in Copenhagen (piano, organ, acc, vocals, composition)
- Karsten Høst (b 14 August 1948) in Frederiksberg (drums, percussion)
- Mikael Miller (b 8 October 1952) in Greve (el-g, g, cl, fl, v, ss, vo, komp).

== Discography ==
- Tæl Aldrig Imorgen Med (single) (1968, sonet)
- Alrunes Rod (1969, sonet)
- Hej Du (1970, sonet)
- Alrune Rock (1971, sonet)
- Spredt For Vinden (1972, mandragora - reissued 2002, Karma Music)
- 4-vejs (1974, mandragora - reissued 2002, Karma Music)
- Tatuba Tapes (1975, mandragora)
- Alrunen Live i Aalborg (2002, Ohm records)
