= The Raveonettes Sing... =

The Raveonettes Sing…

Studio album by The Raveonettes
- Released: 19 July 2024
- Genre: Indie rock; shoegaze; noise pop; post-punk revival
- Label: Cleopatra
- Producer: The Raveonettes

The Raveonettes chronology
2016 Atomized (2016)	The Raveonettes Sing… (2024)	Pe'ahi II (2025)

Singles from The Raveonettes Sing...
- 1. "Return of the Grievous Angel" Released: 17 May 2024; 2. "All I Have to Do Is Dream" Released: 29 May 2024

The Raveonettes Sing… is the ninth studio album by Danish indie rock duo The Raveonettes, released on 19 July 2024 by Cleopatra Records. It marks the band's first album since 2016 Atomized in 2017. The album features cover versions of some of the group's favorite songs and artists including The Everly Brothers, The Shangri-Las, The Cramps, Buddy Holly, The Shirelles, and The Velvet Underground. The album was preceded by the singles "Return of the Grievous Angel" and "All I Have to Do Is Dream". An expanded version of the album features two previously released bonus tracks.

== Track listing ==
The Ravenonettes Sing…
No.	Title	Original artist(s)	Length
1.	"I Love How You Love Me"	The Paris Sisters
2.	"Goo Goo Muck"	Ronnie Cook and the Gaylads, popularized by The Cramps
3.	"The Girl on Death Row"	Duane Eddy/Lee Hazlewood
4.	"All I Have to Do Is Dream"	The Everly Brothers	2:02
5.	"Will You Still Love Me Tomorrow"	The Shirelles
6.	"Venus in Furs"	The Velvet Underground
7.	"Wishing"	Buddy Holly
8.	"Return of the Grievous Angel"	Gram Parsons	4:15
9.	"Shakin' All Over"	Johnny Kidd & the Pirates, cover of Vince Taylor's version
10.	"Leader of the Pack"	The Shangri-Las

Bonus tracks
No.	Title	Original artist(s)	Length
11.	"The Kids Are Alright"	The Who
12.	"The End"	The Doors
