= Space Invaders (Hit'n'Hide song) =

Single by Hit'n'Hide

from the album On a Ride
- Released: 1998
- Length: 3:12
- Label: Scandinavian Records
- Songwriters: Jens Ringdal; Sune Munkholm Pedersen
- Producer: Michael Skouboe

Hit'n'Hide singles chronology
| "Partyman" (1997) | "Space Invaders" (1998) | "Book of Love" (1998) |

Music video
- "Space Invaders" on YouTube

"Space Invaders" is a song by Danish Eurodance group Hit'n'Hide, released in 1998 on Scandinavian Records as the third single and as well as the third track from their debut studio album, On a Ride (1998). It was written by Jens Ringdal and Sune Munkholm Pedersen, and produced by Michael Skouboe. The song was successful in Scandinavia, peaking at number one in Denmark and number four in Norway. A music video was also produced to promote the single.

== Track listing ==
| No. | Title | Length |
|---|---|---|
| 1. | "Space Invaders" (radio version) | 3:12 |
| 2. | "Space Invaders" (extended mix) | 5:10 |
| 3. | "Space Invaders" (Hyperspace mix) | 7:09 |

== Charts ==
| Chart (1998) | Peak position |
|---|---|
| Denmark (Tracklisten) | 1 |
| European Hot 100 Singles (Billboard) | 27 |
| Finland (Rumba) | 33 |
| Norway (VG-lista) | 4 |
| Sweden (Sverigetopplistan) | 18 |
