= On a Ride =

Studio album by Hit'n'Hide
- Released: 1998
- Recorded: Hipcat Studio
- Studio: Skylab Studio
- Length: 41:28
- Label: Scandinavian
- Producer: House of Scandinavia

Hit'n'Hide chronology
On a Ride (1998)	Hit'n'Hide (2000)

Singles from On a Ride
- 1. "Sundance" Released: 1997; 2. "Partyman" Released: 1997; 3. "Space Invaders" Released: 1998; 4. "Book of Love" Released: 1998; 5. "World of Dreams" Released: 1999

On a Ride is the debut studio album by the Danish Eurodance group Hit'n'Hide, released in 1998 on Scandinavian Records and was produced by House of Scandinavia. It features the artist's singles "Sundance", "Partyman", "Book of Love", "World of Dreams", and perhaps the group's most well-known hit, "Space Invaders".

== Track listing ==
No.	Title	Length
1.	"Hit'n'Hide on a Ride"	3:36
2.	"Sundance"	3:29
3.	"Space Invaders"	3:12
4.	"Boomerang"	3:36
5.	"California"	3:38
6.	"Partyman"	3:20
7.	"Doo Run"	3:24
8.	"True Love"	3:17
9.	"World of Dreams"	3:18
10.	"Mr. Melody"	3:20
11.	"Be My Bodyguard"	3:48
12.	"Book of Love"	3:30
Total length:		41:28

== Charts ==
Chart (1998)	Peak position
Finnish Albums (Suomen virallinen lista)	10
