= 2016 Atomized =

Studio album by The Raveonettes
- Released: 17 February 2017 (Digital download), 21 April 2017 (CD)
- Recorded: January–December 2016
- Genre: Shoegaze, noise pop, post-punk revival
- Label: The Beat Dies
- Producer: The Raveonettes

The Raveonettes chronology
Pe'ahi (2014)	2016 Atomized (2017)	The Raveonettes Sing... (2024)

Professional ratings
Aggregate scores
Source	Rating
Metacritic	76/100
Review scores
Source	Rating
AllMusic	4/5 stars
Spin	favorable

2016 Atomized (also known as the Anti-Album) is the eighth studio album by Danish indie rock duo The Raveonettes, released on 17 February 2017 for digital download and on 21 April 2017 on CD. A special Record Store Day vinyl version will be released the following day. All songs were previously released individually for download in 2016 through Spotify, Apple Music, YouTube and Pledgemusic.

== Background ==
In late 2015, the band announced plans for the Rave-Sound-of-the-Month and that they would be recording and releasing twelve new songs online for each month of the year in 2016. The collection of songs was dubbed the "Anti-Album". "Every month throughout 2016 we'll be dropping a freshly recorded track. Taking you on a ride, potentially schizophrenic & disjointed, potentially cohesive and related" the band said.

== Track listing ==
No.	Title	Length
1.	"This World Is Empty (Without You)"	2:22
2.	"Run Mascara Run"	2:57
3.	"EXCUSES"	3:41
4.	"Junko Ozawa"	2:54
5.	"Scout"	4:12
6.	"Won't You Leave Me Alone"	3:22
7.	"Where Are You Wild Horses"	3:14
8.	"A Good Fight"	3:25
9.	"This Is Where It Ends"	2:47
10.	"Choke on Love"	2:19
11.	"Fast Food"	3:50
12.	"PENDEJO"	11:53
