= Whip It On =

EP by The Raveonettes
- Released: 6 August 2002
- Studios: Once Was & Sauna Recording Studio
- Genres: Noise pop, garage rock
- Length: 21:10
- Label: Sony

The Raveonettes chronology
Whip It On (2002)	Chain Gang of Love (2003)

Singles from Whip It On
- 1. "Attack of the Ghost Riders" Released: 9 December 2002; 2. "Beat City" Released: 18 March 2003

Whip It On is the debut mini-album of Danish indie rock group The Raveonettes, which was released on 6 August 2002. Every song is in the key of B-flat minor in contrast to the follow-up album Chain Gang of Love, which is almost entirely in the key of B-flat major. Each song also features only three chords.

The artwork for the album is a photograph taken by Søren Solkær Starbird.

== Reception ==
Professional ratings
Review scores
Source	Rating
Allmusic	3.5/5 stars
NME	7/10 stars
Pitchfork Media	(5.8/10)

The album received generally positive reviews upon its release. At Metacritic, which assigns a normalised rating out of 100 to reviews from mainstream critics, the album received an average score of 70, based on 15 reviews, which indicates "Generally favorable reviews".

== Track listing ==
All tracks are written by Sune Rose Wagner.

No.	Title	Length
1.	"Attack of the Ghost Riders"	2:30
2.	"Veronica Fever"	2:37
3.	"Do You Believe Her"	2:07
4.	"Chains"	2:34
5.	"Cops on Our Tail"	2:58
6.	"My Tornado"	2:05
7.	"Bowels of the Beast"	3:14
8.	"Beat City"	3:08
Total length:		21:10
