= The Seven Mile Journey =

- Origin: Aalborg, Denmark
- Genres: Post-rock, ambient, instrumental, classical, experimental, drone
- Years active: 1999–present
- Labels: Fonogram-Agency
- Members: Nicolai; Jakob; Morten; Henrik; Lars
- Website: www.thesevenmilejourney.dk

The Seven Mile Journey is a Danish post-rock band. They have been making instrumental music since 1999, which also characterizes their debut album The Journey Studies. The basis of their music is dynamic shifts, gloomy sounds, and long and intense sound surfaces, which invite the listener to absorption.

== Discography ==
=== Demo ===
- 2001 - The Seven Mile Journey
1. In an Eight Track Universe
2. The Mystery of Olden
3. Distant March
4. When Blizzards are Afraid

=== Full-length ===
- 2006 - The Journey Studies
1. Through the Alter Ego Justifications
2. Passenger's Log, the Unity Fractions
3. Theme for the Oddmory Philosophies
4. The Murderer/Victim Monologues
- 2008 - The Metamorphosis Project
1. Theme for the Elthenbury Massacre
2. The Catharsis Session
3. Identity Journals (anonymous)
4. January 4 - The Hypothesis Hours
5. A Sanctuary for Lugubrious Tracy
6. Purification - The Journey Transcriptions
- 2011 - Notes for the Synthesis
1. Departures
2. The Alter Ego Autopsies
3. Simplicity Has a Paradox
4. The Engram Dichotomy
5. Transits
6. The Etiology Diaries
- 2016 - Templates for Mimesis
1. Substitutes for Oblivion
2. The Axiom Anomaly
3. Causalities
4. The Oddmory Principle
5. Tutorials
