= Late Night Venture =

Danish post-metal band

- Origin: Copenhagen, Denmark
- Genres: Post-metal, post-rock, doom-metal, sludge, space metal
- Years active: 2005 - present
- Labels: Quartermain Records, Planet of Sounds, Oxide Tones, Dunk! Records, Danish Music and Entertainment, Virkelighedsfjern, Czar of Crickets
- Members: Søren Hartvig - Vocals/Guitar; Jonas Qvesel - Keys; Jens Back - Bass; Peter Sørensen - Drums; Michael Falk - Guitar&Vocals
- Past members: Peter Lau Olsen

Late Night Venture is a post-metal band from Copenhagen, Denmark.

== Band history ==
Late Night Venture was formed in 2005 by the remaining members of the indie/dream pop band Flying Virgins. Originally picking up where F.V. left the band has since developed a heavier and more atmospheric sound.

== Discography ==
=== Studio albums ===
- 2023 V: Bones of the Extinct (Vinyltroll Records/Trepanation Recordings)
- 2019 Subcosmos (Czar of Crickets/Virkelighedsfjern)
- 2015 Tychonians (Danish Music & Entertainment)
- 2012 Pioneers of Spaceflight (Dunk! Records/Oxide Tones)
- 2006 Late Night Venture S/T (Quartermain Records)

=== EPs ===
- 2016 Pilots/Greetings (Virkelighedsfjern)
- 2011 Birmingham (Dunk! Records)
- 2009 Illuminations EP (Quartermain Records/Planet of Sounds)

As Flying Virgins

- 2004 Lazy Star EP (Quartermain Records)
- 2003 Your Spectacular Light (Quartermain Records)
