= Per Nielsen (musician) =

Danish trumpet player

- Born: 1954 (age 70–71); Sønderborg, Denmark
- Occupation: Musician
- Instrument: Trumpet
- Website: www.trompet.com

Per Nielsen (born 1 June 1954) is a popular Danish trumpet player.

Nielsen has released several albums that have sold around 400,000 copies, including three albums that have been certified platinum and nine albums certified as gold. His debut release on 23 May 1987, called Trumpet Concertos, has been re-released several times.

Nielsen was born in Sønderborg. In addition to his solo career and his tours, he has been a member and main trumpeter of Sønderjyllands Symfoniorkester (the South Jutland Symphony Orchestra).

== Discography ==
=== Albums ===
Year	Album	Peak positions
Year	Album	DEN
2001	My Way	2
2002	Christmas Time	11
2003	My Classical Moments	37
2005	With Friends	16
2007	Amazing Grace	20
2009	Danske toner	11
2011	Danske toner	11
2014	Mine favoritter	6
