= Et aar uden dig =

2022 studio album by Aphaca

Studio album by Aphaca
- Released: 24 June 2022
- Genre: Indie pop
- Length: 32:31
- Label: self-published
- Producer: Jakob Svensson

Aphaca chronology
Et aar uden dig (2022)	Mig og min mund

Et aar uden dig (transl. One year without you) is the debut studio album by the Danish indie pop band Aphaca. Self-published, the band released the album on 24 June 2022. It has since gone on to achieve gold certification from IFPI Danmark, and peaked at number 18 on the Hitlisten charts more than three years after its release.

== Release and reception ==
Et aar uden dig was released as the band's debut studio album, and was produced by Jakob Svensson. The album marked the group's first full-length release following a series of independent singles released beginning in 2019. "Aphaca123" and "Hjerteklang" were released as singles from the album, with neither reaching the Hitlisten charts.

At the time of its release, the album received minimal mainstream attention and relatively muted critical reception compared to the band's later commercial breakthrough, and was largely overshadowed by later success. Following Aphaca's rapid rise in popularity after 2024, Et aar uden dig was reassessed more positively by parts of the Danish music press. The article highlighted the group's growing reputation for warm, youthful Danish-language pop and stronger songwriting development after the debut album.

Later Soundvenue coverage connected the album to the beginning of what the publication described as one of the fastest-rising careers in contemporary Danish music. In a 2026 retrospective on the band's documentary, Aphaca – Brug for hinanden, the magazine described the group's trajectory as "one of the wildest comet careers in Danish music." The album has since gone on to achieve gold certification from IFPI Danmark. The album did not reach the Hitlisten charts until the summer of 2025, when it first appeared at number 34. In July, it reached its peak at number 18.

== Track listing ==
No.	Title	Lyrics	Producer(s)	Length
1.	"Concordia"	Bertil Engberg Nielsen; Bertram Ask Plauborg; Noal Elias Rasmussen; Rumle Hueg Kærså	Jakob Svensson	1:08
2.	"Sommersol"	Nielsen; Plauborg; Rasmussen; Kærså	Svensson	2:48
3.	"S-tog" (featuring Clara Rose)	Nielsen; Plauborg; Rasmussen; Kærså; Clara Frederikke Rose Lundberg	Svensson	3:16
4.	"Vinter"	Nielsen; Plauborg; Rasmussen; Kærså	Svensson	2:34
5.	"Følsomt"	Nielsen; Plauborg; Rasmussen; Kærså	Svensson	3:06
6.	"Aphaca123"	Nielsen; Plauborg; Rasmussen; Kærså	Svensson	3:16
7.	"Kær som du"	Nielsen; Plauborg; Rasmussen; Kærså	Svensson	3:24
8.	"Hjerteklang" (featuring USSEL)	Nielsen; Plauborg; Rasmussen; Kærså; USSEL	Svensson	2:49
9.	"Vikudrømme"	Nielsen; Plauborg; Rasmussen; Kærså	Svensson	2:44
10.	"Knust"	Nielsen; Plauborg; Rasmussen; Kærså	Svensson	3:00
11.	"Det sidste kys"	Nielsen; Plauborg; Rasmussen; Kærså	Svensson	2:26
12.	"Et helt aar"	Nielsen; Plauborg; Rasmussen; Kærså	Svensson	1:52
Total length:				32:31

== Charts ==
Weekly chart performance
Chart (2026)	Peak position
Danish Albums (Hitlisten)	18

== Certifications ==
Certifications
Region	Certification	Certified units/sales
Denmark (IFPI Danmark)	Gold	10,000^{‡}
^{*} Sales figures based on certification alone.^{‡} Sales+streaming figures based on certification alone.
