= Burnin Red Ivanhoe =

Danish rock band

- Origin: Copenhagen, Denmark
- Genres: Progressive Rock / Jazz Fusion
- Years active: 1967–present
- Labels: Sonet, Universal Music, Shadoks, Telefunken, Stateside, Hify, Warner, Repertoire, Soundvision, Music on Vinyl
- Members: Karsten Vogel; Steen Claësson; Kim Menzer; Ole Fick; Jess Stæhr; Bo Thrige Andersen
- Website: www.olefick.dk/burn

Burnin Red Ivanhoe is a Danish rock band formed in Copenhagen in 1967.

== History ==
The band had their first appearance in 1968 under the name the Burnin Red Ivanhoes. Soon Per Kragh-Møller was replaced by Bo Thrige Andersen and Steen Lange by Arne Würgler, and the band name was shortened to Burnin Red Ivanhoe. The record label Sonet became aware of the band and released their debut album M 144 as a double LP in 1969. In addition to Claësson, Vogel, Würgler and Anderson, Kim Menzer (vocals, trumpet, saxophone and harmonica), Ole Fick (vocals and guitar), Steffen Andersen and Mads Vinding (both bass) were also involved as new band members. Burnin Red Ivanhoe play proto-progressive rock influenced by blues and jazz with Danish lyrics on M 144.

After the debut, Jess Stæhr became the band's only bassist. This line-up remained stable for three years. Burnin Red Ivanhoe toured domestically and internationally. Despite a first separation in 1972 and several reunions, the formation released five more albums by 1974. On Right On (1974), Kenneth Knudsen (keyboard) and Karsten Lyng (vocals), but no longer Kim Menzer, can be heard. In the meantime, Karsten Vogel had already become active with his new fusion band Secret Oyster.

In 1980, Fick, Vogel, Menzer, Andersen and Stæhr got together again for a studio album; on the 1998 album, in addition to Fick, Vogel and Menzer, there were also Klaus Menzer (drums), Janne Eilskov (vocals), Rasmus Hedeboe (guitar) and Assi Roar and Jon Bruland (bass). An album with live recordings from the early 1970s was released in 2009. Burnin Red Ivanhoe still perform live regularly today.
