= Sonet Records =

Swedish record label

- Parent company: PolyGram
- Founded: 1956
- Founder: Sven Lindholm; Gunnar Bergström
- Defunct: 1991
- Status: Defunct
- Genre: Jazz, blues, pop, rock
- Country of origin: Sweden

Sonet Records was a jazz, pop and rock record label operating as an imprint of Universal Music Sweden. It was founded in Sweden in 1956.

Sonet Records was established by Sven Lindholm and Gunnar Bergström, who managed the label into the 1980s. Dag Haeggqvist, the owner of Gazell Records, became an executive of the label in 1960, and Sonet eventually acquired Gazell's catalogue. It was distributed by Pickwick Records in North America in the 1960s, where it was involved in releasing some of Bill Haley's latter-day material. The label set up offices throughout Europe, including the United Kingdom. It also expanded into film, video, and other visual arts in addition to music. The label released both new material and reissues, many by Scandinavian artists in addition to albums by American jazz musicians as well as non-jazz material such as pop and rock music. It acquired the Danish label Storyville Records at some point.

Sonet Records was acquired by PolyGram in 1991.

== Artists who have released material on Sonet Records ==
=== Jazz and blues artists ===
- Bernard Addison (listed on Sonet SLP 1001 Immortal Swing Sessions 1938-1943)
- Svend Asmussen
- Chet Baker
- Duck Baker
- The Balfa Brothers
- Chris Barber
- Count Basie
- Chu Berry (listed on Sonet SLP 1001 Immortal Swing Sessions 1938-1943)
- Rolf Billberg
- Ruby Braff
- Randy Brecker
- Bob Brookmeyer
- Roy Buchanan
- Burnin' Red Ivanhoe
- Gary Burton
- Benny Carter (listed on Sonet SLP 1001 Immortal Swing Sessions 1938-1943)
- Casiopea
- Al Casey (listed on Sonet SLP 1001 Immortal Swing Sessions 1938-1943)
- Sid Catlett (listed on Sonet SLP 1001 Immortal Swing Sessions 1938-1943)
- Don Cherry
- Richard Clayderman
- Vassar Clements
- Al Cohn
- Albert Collins
- Culpeper's Orchard
- Eddie "Lockjaw" Davis
- Wild Bill Davison
- Buddy DeFranco
- Vic Dickenson
- Manu Dibango
- Arne Domnerus
- Rockin' Dopsie
- Champion Jack Dupree
- Berndt Egerbladh
- Roy Eldridge (listed on Sonet SLP 1001 Immortal Swing Sessions 1938-1943)
- Dave Ellis
- Buddy Emmons
- Rolf Ericson
- John Fahey
- Maffy Falay
- Maynard Ferguson
- Svein Finnerud
- Curtis Fuller
- Funhouse
- Jan Garbarek
- Don Gardner
- Stan Getz
- Dizzy Gillespie
- Tiny Grimes
- Dexter Gordon
- Stefan Grossman
- Lars Gullin
- Rune Gustafsson
- Bengt Hallberg
- Lionel Hampton
- Nancy Harrow
- Clyde Hart (listed on Sonet SLP 1001 Immortal Swing Sessions 1938-1943)
- Coleman Hawkins (listed on Sonet SLP 1001 Immortal Swing Sessions 1938-1943)
- Earl Hines
- Bendik Hofseth
- Billie Holiday
- John Lee Hooker
- Hot Lips Page (listed on Sonet SLP 1001 Immortal Swing Sessions 1938-1943)
- Harry Jaeger (listed on Sonet SLP 1001 Immortal Swing Sessions 1938-1943)
- Jamie Kent
- Barney Kessel
- Earl King
- The Kinsey Report
- John Kirby (listed on Sonet SLP 1001 Immortal Swing Sessions 1938-1943)
- Lee Konitz
- Leo Kottke
- Karin Krog
- Morten Gunnar Larsen
- Björn J:son Lindh
- Lonnie Mack
- Magnetic North Orchestra
- Adam Makowicz
- Jimmy Martin
- Sabu Martinez
- Brett Marvin and the Thunderbolts
- Al Morgan (listed on Sonet SLP 1001 Immortal Swing Sessions 1938-1943)
- Moving Fingers
- Marius Muller
- New York Contemporary Five
- New York Jazz Quartet
- Langsomt Mot Nord
- Fredrik Noren
- Niels-Henning Ørsted Pedersen
- Pan
- Charlie Parker
- Bent Patey
- Ole Paus
- Bud Powell
- Professor Longhair
- Public Enemies
- Mike Richmond
- Mikael Rickfors
- Rockin' Jimmy & the Brothers of the Night
- Alrune Rod
- Red Rodney
- Bernt Rosengren
- Jimmy Rowles
- George Russell
- Sanne Salomonsen
- Joe Sample
- Archie Shepp
- Zoot Sims
- Sivuca
- Helen Sjoholm
- Peter Skellern
- Johnny Smith
- Spellbound
- Slam Stewart
- Sonny Stitt
- The Stukas
- Bo Sundblad
- Sun Ra
- Jamaaladeen Tacuma
- Sebastiao Tapajos
- Tasavallan Presidentti
- Buddy Tate
- KoKo Taylor
- Okay Temiz
- Joey Tempest
- Toots Thielemans
- Ed Thigpen
- Jukka Tolonen
- Radka Toneff
- Trio Toykeat
- Charles Tyler
- Michal Urbaniak
- Frank Valdor
- Billy Vaughn
- Joe Venuti
- Paolo Vinaccia
- Mads Vinding
- Cornelis Vreeswijk
- Sylvia Vrethammar
- Ulf Wakenius
- Bengt-Arne Wallin
- Kazumi Watanabe
- Bugge Wesseltoft
- Putte Wickman
- Big Joe Williams
- Teddy Wilson
- Gustav Winckler
- Kai Winding
- Lars Winnerback
- Johnny Winter
- Monica Zetterlund

=== Pop and rock artists ===
- Army of Lovers (1987–1988)
- Belfast Gypsies
- Black Lace
- Mari Boine
- Bobbysocks!
- Country Joe McDonald
- Fats Domino
- Aynsley Dunbar
- Ghost
- Bill Haley & His Comets
- Jethro Tull
- Komeda
- The Korgis
- Midnight Sun
- Ann-Christine Nyström
- Freda Payne
- Rudy Pompilli and the Comets
- John Renbourn
- Secret Service
- Nina Simone
- Strawbs
- George Thorogood
- Pernilla Wahlgren
- Jennifer Warnes
