= Chain Gang of Love =

Studio album by The Raveonettes
- Released: 25 August 2003
- Recorded: 2003
- Genre: Garage rock, noise pop, indie rock
- Length: 33:08
- Label: Columbia
- Producer: Richard Gottehrer, Sune Rose Wagner

The Raveonettes chronology
Whip It On (2002)	Chain Gang of Love (2003)	Pretty in Black (2005)

Singles from Chain Gang of Love
- 1. "That Great Love Sound" Released: 18 August 2003; 2. "Heartbreak Stroll" Released: 17 February 2004; 3. "Remember" Released: Promo Only

Chain Gang of Love is the debut studio album by the Danish rock duo, The Raveonettes. The album was released in 2003 by Sony Records and was co-produced by Richard Gottehrer, who had previously worked on hit albums by Blondie, the Go-Go's and Richard Hell & the Voidoids. All of the songs, but two, are under 3 minutes long and are written in the key of B flat major; a concept similar to their previous record, Whip It On, whose tracks had a similar length and were written in the key of B flat minor.

The album peaked at #123 in the U.S. charts and at #43 in the UK.

"That Great Love Sound" was featured on the soundtrack of FIFA 2004

== Reception ==
Professional ratings
Aggregate scores
Source	Rating
Metacritic	77/100
Review scores
Source	Rating
AllMusic	4/5 stars
Alternative Press	4/5
Blender	4/5 stars
Entertainment Weekly	B+
The Guardian	2/5 stars
Pitchfork	7.1/10
Q	4/5 stars
Rolling Stone	4/5 stars
The Rolling Stone Album Guide	4/5 stars
Slant Magazine	3/5 stars

Chain Gang of Love received generally positive reviews upon its release. At Metacritic, which assigns a normalised rating out of 100 to reviews from mainstream critics, the album received an average score of 77, based on 21 reviews, which indicates "Generally favorable reviews".

== Track listing ==
All tracks are written by Sune Rose Wagner, except where noted

No.	Title	Writer(s)	Length
1.	"Remember"		2:41
2.	"That Great Love Sound"	Richard Gottehrer, Wagner	3:16
3.	"Noisy Summer"		2:24
4.	"The Love Gang"		2:16
5.	"Let's Rave On"		1:55
6.	"Dirty Eyes (Sex Don't Sell)"		2:26
7.	"Love Can Destroy Everything"		2:54
8.	"Heartbreak Stroll"		2:26
9.	"Little Animal"		3:09
10.	"Untamed Girls"		1:44
11.	"Chain Gang of Love"		2:36
12.	"The Truth About Johnny"		2:36
13.	"New York Was Great"		2:48

Japanese bonus track
No.	Title	Writer(s)	Length
14.	"C'mon Everybody"	Eddie Cochran	2:29
