= The Floor Is Made of Lava =

Rock band

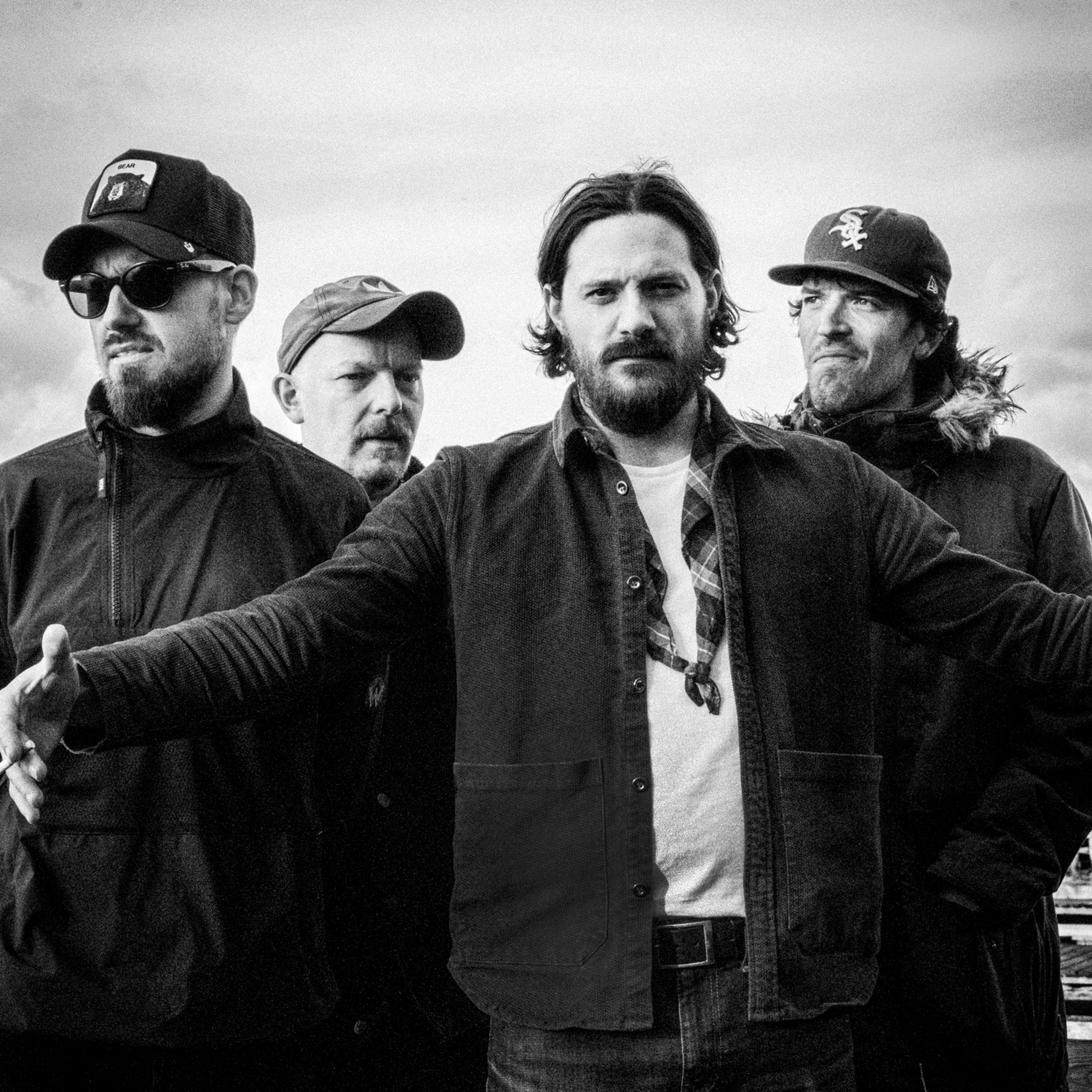
- The Floor Is Made of Lava in 2020

Background information
- Origin: Copenhagen, Denmark
- Genres: Rock
- Years active: 2006–present
- Label: Universal Music Denmark
- Publishers: Tabu Records; Target Records
- Members: Tobias Kippenberger; Simon Visti; Lars Morten Amstrup; Asbjørn Nørgaard

The Floor Is Made Of Lava is a Danish rock band, formed in 2006. The band consists of Tobias Kippenberger (vocals), Simon Visti (bass), Lars Rock (guitar) and Ace (drums).

In 2007 they had their debut, with the album All Juice No Fruit, which was produced by Troels Abrahamsen of Veto. In 2010 they released their second album Howl at the Moon, which was produced by Sebastion Wolff of Kellermensch.

The band have primarily played concerts in Denmark. They've performed at Roskilde Festival, and have warmed up for bands such as Oasis, AC/DC, Nephew and D-A-D.

== Discography ==
=== Albums ===
Studio

- 2007: All Juice, No Fruit
- 2010: Howl At The Moon
- 2012: Kids and Drunks

Remix

- 2008: All Juice, No Fruit Remixed

=== EPs ===
- 2011: Record Store Day (EP)
- 2012: Record Store Day (EP)

=== Singles ===
- 2007: "Do Your Sister"
- 2007: "Told Her I'm From Compton"
- 2008: "Happy Monday"
- 2010: "All Outta Love"
- 2010: "Leave Me Now (Leave Me Tomorrow)"
- 2010: "Harder Than You Think"
- 2012: "Lost in the Woods"
