= Liselotte Selbiger =

Elisabeth Charlotte Ida (Liselotte) Selbiger (1906–2008) was a German-born Danish musician who initially performed in chamber music and played the cello in a Berlin orchestra. Instructed by the Polish celebrity Wanda Landowska, she later specialized in the harpsichord, especially the music of J. S. Bach. As she was of Jewish ancestry, she had to leave Germany during the Nazi era, first moving to Denmark and later to Sweden. After the war she returned to Denmark where she was responsible for reviving interest in the harpsichord.

== Early life and family ==
Born on 23 August 1906 in Berlin, Elisabeth Charlotte Ida Selbiger was the daughter of the notary Leo Selbiger (1875–1942) and his wife the artist Helene née Cohn (1883–1942). She was the family's only child. From an early age, she learnt to play the piano and the cello. She graduated as a music teacher from the Hochschule für Musik in 1933 after becoming a private student of Leonid Kreutzer. She then studied the harpsichord under Carl Bittner.

In 1930, she married the music historian Herbert Adolf Friedrich Rosenberg (1904–1984). The marriage was dissolved in 1940. In August 1940, she married the bank manager Carsten Johannes Gottlieb (1914–1983). The marriage was dissolved in 1950.

== Career ==
While in Berlin, Selbiger played the cello in both in chamber music and in orchestras, both with her father and her husband. In particular, she performed in the amateur Ärzteorchester together with Albert Einstein who played the viola.

Selbiger who was of Jewish ancestry, was told in 1935 that she could no longer work as a music teacher. After her half-Jewish husband also lost his job, the couple moved to Denmark but experienced difficulty in obtaining residency permits. Nevertheless, Selbiger began to develop her career playing the harpsichord, which had only recently been reintroduced in Denmark. For many years, Selbiger was the only musician to devote herself to the instrument. In 1938, she went to Paris where she studied under the celebrated Wanda Landowska. She gave her first concert in Copenhagen in 1939 but had to flee to Sweden under the German occupation. There she gave many concerts including one in the Drottningholm Palace Theatre. At the end of the war, she was able to return to Denmark.

Until the mid-1970s, she performed in concerts, gave lectures and made recordings, specializing in Bach's music. She was frequently a soloist in radio broadcasts, sometimes playing Bach's The Well-Tempered Clavier. In addition to Bach, she also played compositions by Domenico Scarlatti, François Couperin and Jean-Philippe Rameau. Selbiger also proved to be a competent conductor until she had to retire as a result of illness.

According to Dansk Kvindebiografisk Leksikon, Liselotte Selbiger died in 2008. Berlingske reported in February 2009 that she was 101 years old when she died in early 2008 and that she had left a fortune to the Danish Ornithological Society to be used for bird care.

== External lists ==
- Recordings by Liselotte Selbiger from Discogs
