= Psyched Up Janis =

Danish rock band

- Origin: Sønderborg, Denmark
- Genres: Punk rock, grunge, alternative rock
- Years active: 1989-1999, 2009, 2014
- Labels: This Way Up/Universal, EMI-Medley Denmark, Replay Records
- Past members: Sune Rose Wagner; Jakob Jørgensen; Yebo; Martin Bjerregård; Mads Glenstrup

Psyched Up Janis was a Danish rock band formed by Sune Rose Wagner, now a member of The Raveonettes, Martin Bjerregaard, and Jakob Jørgensen.

== Biography ==
Sune Wagner and Jakob Jørgensen played their first concert in Sønderborg under the name of Western Front, in 1989. They recorded their first demo entitled I Never Change in 1992. That year, the band moved to Copenhagen and Martin Bjerregaard joined the band to be a drummer. The trio went to Sweden to record the self-financed EP, I Died in my Teens. The song by the same name made Single of the Week in Kerrang! Psyched up Janis recorded their debut full-length album Swell in Wales with Craig Leon as record producer.

In 1995 the band signed with British record company This Way Up/Universal. The year after, they moved to England to pursue their career, but without much luck. They opened the largest stage at the Roskilde Festival in 1996. Martin had just left the band, so Killing Joke's drummer was borrowed for the concert. In 1996 the band recorded the album Beats Me in England which was mixed at Abbey Road Studios. Jesper "Yebo" Reginal from the band Thau became the new drummer.

In 1998 Psyched Up Janis toured Denmark with the album Enter The Super Peppermint Lounge. Sune played drums on the album himself. In 1999, after moving to the United States, they released the acoustic album The Quiet Album and played a "last concert" together at the 1999 Roskilde Festival. Some old demos were released that same year under the name Hi-Fi Low Life.

The band reformed, briefly in 2009 and again in 2014 playing live concerts and the Roskilde festival.

Jakob Jørgensen later formed the band Knallert. Yet later (in 2015) he played bass in Childrenn. Martin Bjerregaard toured and recorded with Australian punk-band The Saints and later joined the band Racetrack Babies. Sune has played with surf-band The Tremolo Beer Gut and occasionally with Sort Sol. In 2002 he presented his new band The Raveonettes with Sharin Foo.

== Discography ==
=== Albums ===
- Swell (1994)
- Beats Me (1997)
- Enter the Super Peppermint Lounge (1998)
- Hi-Fi Low Life (1999)
- The Quiet Album (live, 1999)

=== EP ===
- Where the Lights Won't Shine (1996)

=== Singles ===
- "I Died in My Teens" (1995)
- "Vanity" (1996)
- "Airhead" (1997)
