= Thylejren =

Commune in Copenhagen, Denmark

Coordinates: 57.069°N 8.933°E

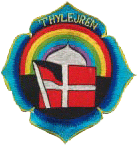

Thylejren (Thy Camp) or Frøstruplejren started as an encampment and festival in the summer of 1970. The community behind the festival, Det Ny Samfund (The New Society) found an area in Han Herred between Frøstrup and Østerild (near Thy in Denmark) where they could host a festival, inspired by the Isle of Wight Festival in England and Woodstock in the United States.

When some of the participants stayed during the winter, Thylejren developed into a more permanent settlement with DIY-houses — still upholding the hippie-ideal after more than fifty years, with a population of 65 as of 2020. Thylejren has evolved into an alternative society in the midst of the Danish society - a micro-nation with its own territory.
