= Analogik =

Danish band

- Origin: Aarhus, Denmark
- Genres: Jazz, breakbeat, electro swing, hip hop, Balkan music
- Years active: 2002-present
- Members: Theis Bror, Magnus Damgaard, Jesper Kobberøs, Asger Strandby
- Website: analogik.bandcamp.com

Analogik is a Danish band from Aarhus. The group members are: Asger Strandby on turntables with a laptop; Jesper Kobberøs on guitar, flute and air organ; Theis Bror on saxophone; and Magnus Damgaard on bass guitar and the double bass. Sometimes they are accompanied on stage by Jonathan Feigh on the violin or Max Buthke on percussion.

The band formed in 2002. Their first album Søens Folk came out in 2006. Their latest album New Seeland received positive reviews.

== Genre ==
Their music mixes elements including jazz, electronica, reggae and Balkan music. Their style has also been called 'Congo Jutland'. On their Facebook page, the group lists breakbeat, electronica, jazz, hip hop and Balkan as their genre.

== Performances ==
The band has performed at Danmarks Grimmeste Festival in 2006 and 2007, Germany's Fusion Festival in 2011 and at Roskilde Festival in 2007, 2009 and 2012.

The band provided the music for Oliver with a Twist at Nørrebros Theater in the fall of 2011.

== Discography ==
- 2006 Søens Folk
- 2008 Klunserbeats Live (live)
- 2010 Max and the Magic Marker Soundtrack
- 2011 A Great Mix
- 2012 New Seeland
- 2018 Glemte Viser 2010-2015
- 2019 Havnens Perle
