= Aphaca (band) =

Danish music group

- Origin: Nørrebro, Denmark
- Genres: Pop; pop rock
- Years active: 2018–present
- Label: Universal Music Denmark
- Members: Rumle Hueg Kærså; Bertil Engberg Nielsen; Bertram Ask Plauborg; Noah Elias Rasmussen
- Website: aphaca.dk

Aphaca (stylised as APHACA) is a Danish pop band formed in 2018 in Nørrebro. The band has released two studio albums and two extended plays, all of which have reached the Danish top 40 charts. The band has also released multiple number one songs. They have received multiple awards from DR P3 and GAFFA, including DR P3's top prize in 2025.

== History ==
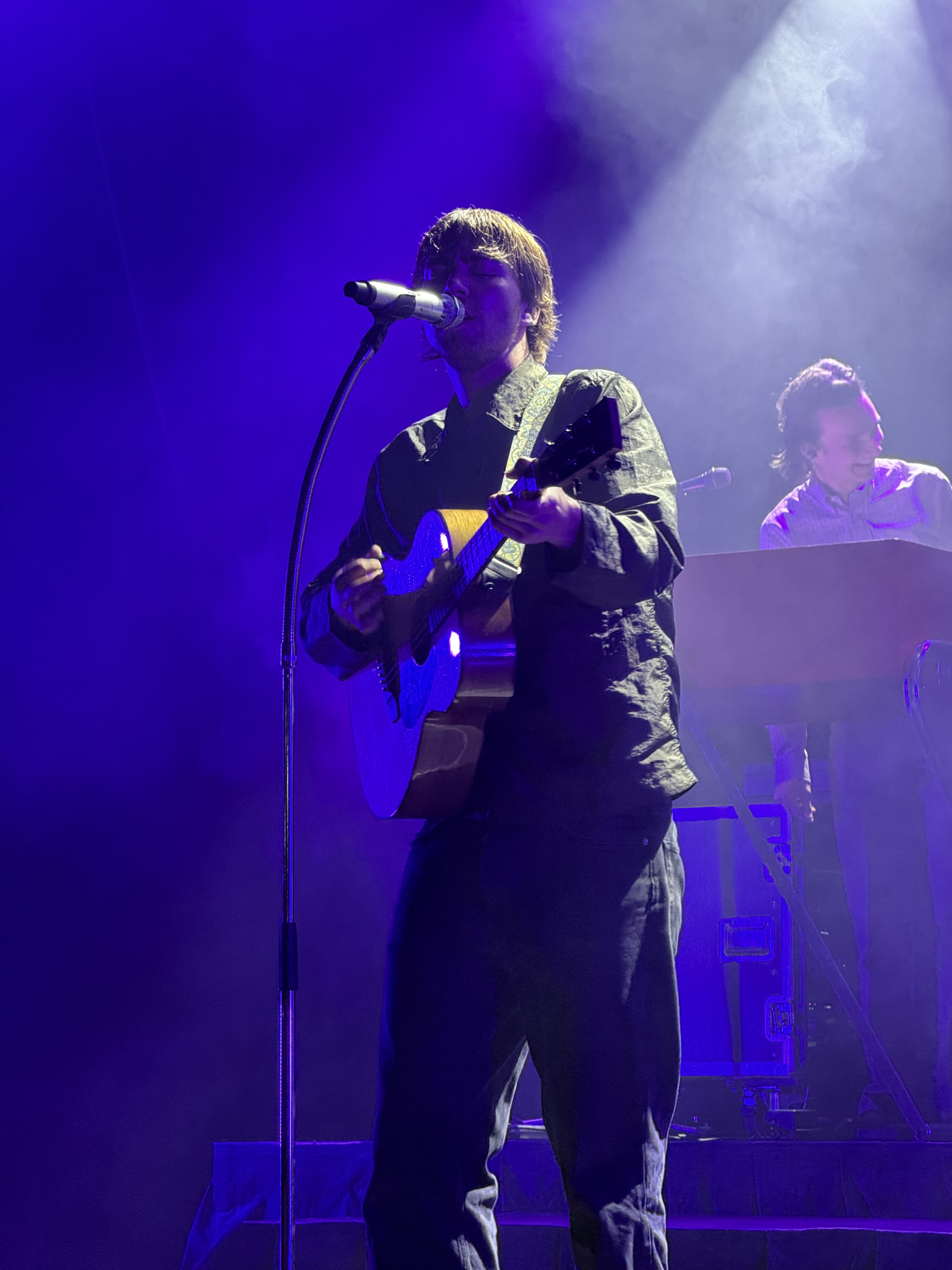
Lead singer Rumle Hueg Kærså with Aphaca in 2025

Lead singer Rumle Hueg Kærså first appeared on Voice Junior when he was 12 years old. The band later formed in 2018, when the members met each other at Det frie Gymnasium, a private school, in Nørrebro. The group released several singles in 2019 and were initially signed to United Records, but would not release their debut studio album until 2022. The album, Et aar uden dig (lit. 'One Year Without You'), was released on 24 June. It later received poor reviews.

Aphaca returned in 2024 with an extended play, Mig og min mund (lit. 'Me and my mouth'), released on 22 March 2024. The EP would later outperform their first studio album, reaching number 12 on Hitlisten, the Danish top 40 charts, on 16 July 2025. The EP produced two songs which would go on to achieve platinum certification from IFPI Danmark. Their second EP of 2024 was released on 11 October 2024. Kan du mærke suset? (lit. 'Can You Feel the Rush?') was noted for being underwhelming in comparison to their other work. Despite mixed reviews, the EP went on to peak at number 10 on the Hitlisten charts, the same week as their previous EP reached its peak. One song from the EP, "Smelter under månen", became the band's first big breakthrough hit. It went on to peak at number two and achieve quadruple-platinum certification.

At the end of 2024, Aphaca was nominated at the Danish Music Awards as New Danish Live Name of the Year. In their first time nominated for a major award in Denmark, the band would ultimately not win the award. In March 2025, the group was nominated for several awards at the annual GAFFA Awards. Their compilation album, Magna, was nominated for Danish Release of the Year and Pop Release of the Year, winning the former. The group also won as New Danish Name of the Year, with their song "Smelter under månen" winning the prize for Danish Hit of the Year. The band was again nominated for awards in October 2025, receiving two nominations at that year's P3 Guld, hosted by DR P3. They won both awards for which they were nominated, winning The Prize and Listener Hit for "En drøm om et menneske".

Aphaca released their second studio album on 27 February 2026, Vild ungdom (lit. 'Wild Youth'). The album was met with positive reviews, with GAFFA, Politiken, and Soundvenue all giving the album five-out-of-six stars in their reviews. With its debut on the Hitlisten charts 11 March, the album reached number one. Two songs from the album, "Flue i et spind" and "Hvor kommer vi fra", also debuted on the singles chart at number one and number three respectively.

=== Live performances ===
Aphaca announced a multi-city tour in October 2024, set for four dates in May 2025. Later in the summer, they also played Roskilde Festival. Originally booked to play a smaller stage, they were upgraded to the festival's second-largest stage just days prior. The performance received positive reviews, with one Politiken writer stating Aphaca was one of the "hottest and best" rock bands from Denmark. The band played at Tivoli Gardens in late July for the venue's weekly free concerts, and Smukfest in the following month.

On 22 September 2025, Aphaca announced a free show that would be held in Copenhagen two days later to celebrate a new single, "Vi pumper hjertet op". Originally not announcing the location, the band unveiled the day of the show that it would be held at Enghaveparken. The show was attended by several thousand people, receiving positive reviews. Soon after the performance at Vesterbro, it was announced the band would play a sold-out concert set for October 2026 at Parken.

The band played the biggest stage at the 2026 Jelling Music Festival, where their performance was met with praise. They also played at Roskilde for the second consecutive year, as well as Tinderbox Festival in Odense.

== Discography ==
=== Studio albums ===
Title	Details	Peak chart positions	Certifications
Title	Details	DEN	Certifications
Et aar uden dig	Released: 24 June 2022; Label: self-published	18	IFPI DEN: Gold
Vild ungdom	Released: 27 February 2026; Label: Baghuset, Universal Music Denmark	1	IFPI DEN: 2× Platinum

=== Extended plays ===
Title	Details	Peak chart positions	Certifications
Title	Details	DEN	Certifications
Mig og min mund	Released: 22 March 2024; Label: Universal Music Denmark	12	IFPI DEN: Platinum
Kan du mærke suset?	Released: 11 October 2024; Label: Universal Music Denmark	10	IFPI DEN: Platinum

=== Singles ===
Title	Year	Peak chart positions	Certifications	Album
Title	Year	DEN	Certifications	Album
"Blomsterbørn"	2019	—		Non-album singles
"Lucifer"	2019	—		Non-album singles
"Shangri-La"	2019	—		Non-album singles
"Flora Flora"	2021	—		Non-album singles
"Aphaca123"	2022	—		Et aar uden dig
"Hjerteklang" (featuring USSEL)	2022	—		Et aar uden dig
"Synger bare"	2024	—		Non-album singles
"Et sted hvor vi de første"	2025	2	IFPI DEN: 2× Platinum	Non-album singles
"En drøm om et menneske"	2025	1	IFPI DEN: 4× Platinum	Vild ungdom
"Vi pumper hjertet op"	2025	4	IFPI DEN: Platinum	Non-album single
"—" denotes a recording that did not chart or was not released in that territory.

=== Other charted songs ===
Title	Year	Peak chart positions	Certifications	Album
Title	Year	DEN	Certifications	Album
"Smelter under månen"	2024	2	IFPI DEN: 4× Platinum	Kan du mærke suset?
"Hjertet på gaden"	2025	18	IFPI DEN: Platinum	Mig og min mund
"Til solen er sort"	2025	22	IFPI DEN: Platinum	Mig og min mund
"Klip klap sandaler"	2025	28	IFPI DEN: Platinum	kan du mærke suset?
"Flue i et spind"	2026	1	IFPI DEN: Platinum	Vild ungdom
"Hvor kommer vi fra"	2026	3		Vild ungdom
"Himmelskib"	2026	13		Vild ungdom
"Dagen er gået"	2026	18		Vild ungdom
"Flyver som fugle"	2026	19		Vild ungdom
"Sidste lys"	2026	40		Vild ungdom
"Hold om mig"	2026	34		Vild ungdom

== Awards and nominations ==
Year	Award	Category	Recipient(s)	Result	Ref.
2024	Danish Music Awards	New Danish Live Name of the Year	Aphaca	Nominated	
2025	GAFFA Awards	Danish Release of the Year	Magna	Won	
2025	GAFFA Awards	Danish Pop Release of the Year	Magna	Nominated	
2025	GAFFA Awards	Danish Hit of the Year	"Smelter under månen"	Won	
2025	GAFFA Awards	New Danish Name of the Year	Aphaca	Won	
2025	P3 Guld	The Prize	Aphaca	Won	
2025	P3 Guld	Listener Hit	"En drøm om et menneske"	Won	
2026	GAFFA Awards	Single of the Year	"En drøm om et menneske"	Won	
2026	GAFFA Awards	Name of the Year	Aphaca	Won	
2026	GAFFA Awards	Live Name of the Year	Aphaca	Won	
2026	GAFFA Awards	Pop Name of the Year	Aphaca	Won	
