= Hit'n'Hide =

Danish musical group

- Origin: Denmark
- Genres: Eurodance, EDM
- Years active: 1997–present
- Label: Scandinavian
- Members: Jeanne C Morgan Jalsing; Christina S.

Hit'n'Hide is a Eurodance duo from Denmark, going through three members including Jeanne C, Morgan Jalsing and Christina S. They are most famous for their single "Space Invaders".

== Discography ==
=== Albums ===
- On a Ride (1998)
- Hit'n'Hide (2000)

=== Singles ===
Title	Year	Peak chart positions					Album
Title	Year	DEN	EUR	NOR	SWE	UK	Album
"Sundance"	1997	—	—	—	—	—	On a Ride
"Partyman"	1997	—	—	—	—	—	On a Ride
"Space Invaders"	1998	1	27	4	18	189	On a Ride
"Book of Love"	1998	—	—	—	—	—	On a Ride
"World of Dreams"	1999	—	—	—	—	—	On a Ride
"Kingdom of Eternity"	1999	—	—	—	—	—	Hit'n'Hide
"Come Come Come"	2000	—	—	—	—	—	Hit'n'Hide
