= Pretty in Black =

Studio album by The Raveonettes
- Released: 3 May 2005
- Genre: Indie rock
- Length: 44:20
- Label: Columbia
- Producers: Sune Rose Wagner, Richard Gottehrer

The Raveonettes chronology
Chain Gang of Love (2003)	Pretty in Black (2005)	Lust Lust Lust (2007)

Singles from Pretty in Black
- 1. "Ode to L.A." Released: 9 May 2005; 2. "Love in a Trashcan" Released: 11 July 2005

Pretty in Black is the second studio album by The Raveonettes. The album was released first in the United States on 3 May 2005, and later in the UK on 25 July 2005. The album includes guest appearances by Maureen Tucker (The Velvet Underground), Ronnie Spector (The Ronettes), and Martin Rev (Suicide).

== Reception ==
Professional ratings
Aggregate scores
Source	Rating
Metacritic	(74/100)
Review scores
Source	Rating
AllMusic	2/5 stars
Alternative Press	4/5 stars
The A.V. Club	4/5 stars
NME	(8/10)
No Ripcord	5/5 stars
Pitchfork	(6.8/10)
Playlouder	4.5/5 stars
PopMatters	(7/10)
Rolling Stone	4/5 stars
Uncut (magazine)	4/5 stars

Pretty in Black was met with "generally favorable" reviews from critics. At Metacritic, which assigns a weighted average rating out of 100 to reviews from mainstream publications, this release received an average score of 74, based on 26 reviews.

== Track listing ==
All tracks are written by Sune Rose Wagner, except where noted.

No.	Title	Writer(s)	Length
1.	"The Heavens"		3:55
2.	"Seductress of Bums"		3:50
3.	"Love in a Trashcan"		2:52
4.	"Sleepwalking"		3:29
5.	"Uncertain Times"		3:58
6.	"My Boyfriend's Back"	Bob Feldman, Jerry Goldstein, Richard Gottehrer	2:39
7.	"Here Comes Mary"		3:02
8.	"Red Tan"		3:48
9.	"Twilight"		3:36
10.	"Somewhere in Texas"		4:28
11.	"You Say You Lie"		2:56
12.	"Ode to L.A."		3:18
13.	"If I Was Young"		2:46

Limited edition digital bonus tracks
No.	Title	Length
14.	"Black Wave"	4:24
15.	"I Wanna Be Taken"	3:05
16.	"Be My Sunshine"	3:05
17.	"Railroad Tracks"	2:21

UK bonus tracks
No.	Title	Writer(s)	Length
14.	"I'm So Lonesome I Could Cry"	Hank Williams	2:54
15.	"Everyday"	Buddy Holly, Norman Petty	2:54
16.	"Black Wave"		4:24
17.	"I Wanna Be Taken"		3:03

== Charts ==
Chart performance for Pretty in Black
Chart (2005)	Peak position
Belgian Albums (Ultratop Flanders)	61
Belgian Albums (Ultratop Wallonia)	93
Danish Albums (Hitlisten)	3
French Albums (SNEP)	109
Scottish Albums (Official Charts)	61
UK Albums (Official Charts)	71
