= Racetrack Babies =

Danish punk rock band

- Origin: Copenhagen, Denmark
- Genres: Punk rock
- Years active: 1998–2007
- Labels: Dead Frog
- Past members: Jacob Aaby, Christian Andersen, Cecilie Ravik, Mads Hvidt, Jamie Salazar, Martin Bjerregaard, Morten Søfting, Søren Hansen, Minh Le, Hans Christian Wayne, Henrik Jørgen Svendsen, Hans Find Møller

Racetrack Babies were a Danish punk rock band, formed in Copenhagen in 1998. Their successful first album produced two MTV music videos for the singles "Changing Weather" and "It's OK". The band recorded three albums with various personnel changes before dissolving in 2007.

== Biography ==
The band was founded in 1998 by Jacob Aaby (guitar), Christian Andersen (guitar and lead vocals), Cecilie Ravik (bass guitar) and Mads Hvidt (drums). In 2002, Jamie Salazar replaced Hvidt on drums and the band recorded its first album, Love Sick, for the band's own Musikministeriet label. The album was rereleased the following year on the Swedish label Dead Frog Records. The album received positive reviews and television and radio airplay throughout Scandinavia. Music videos for two of the album's singles, "Changing Weather" and "It's OK", appeared on MTV's Up North chart during August and September.

Following a brief break-up in 2004, the band reformed as a trio with Andersen (guitar and vocals), Ravik (bass guitar) and Martin Bjerregaard (drums). The band recorded their second album, The End.

With new members in 2005, the band, consisting of Andersen, Morten Søfting, Ravik and Søren Hansen, recorded the album Summer Salt Santiago.

After a long illness, Ravik left the band in 2006 to finish her Finnish studies at Copenhagen University. After a tour of Denmark, Hansen also left the band because stage fright and illness.

The band toured the United States in 2006 and received airplay on college radio stations, with their song "The Storm" reaching 365 (out of 875) on the RIYL weighted college chart. The third album received some positive reviews there and was an editor's choice "Best of 2006" for Indie-Music online magazine.

After the US. tour, the bass guitar player, Minh Le, and the drummer, Søfting, left Racetrack Babies. In May 2007, Hans Christian Wayne, Henrik Jørgen Svendsen on drums, Hans Find Møller on bass guitar and Hansen on guitar recorded the album The Captain of Sorrow, but it was never released. The record was later released under the artist name The Captain of Sorrow and the record was called Racetrack Babies

== Discography ==
=== Albums ===
- 2002 Love Sick
- 2004 The End
- 2006 Summer Salt Santiago

=== Singles ===
- 2000 "Hva' tror du selv?"
- 2006 "The Storm"
- 2006 "The Messenger"
