= The Raveonettes =

Danish indie rock duo

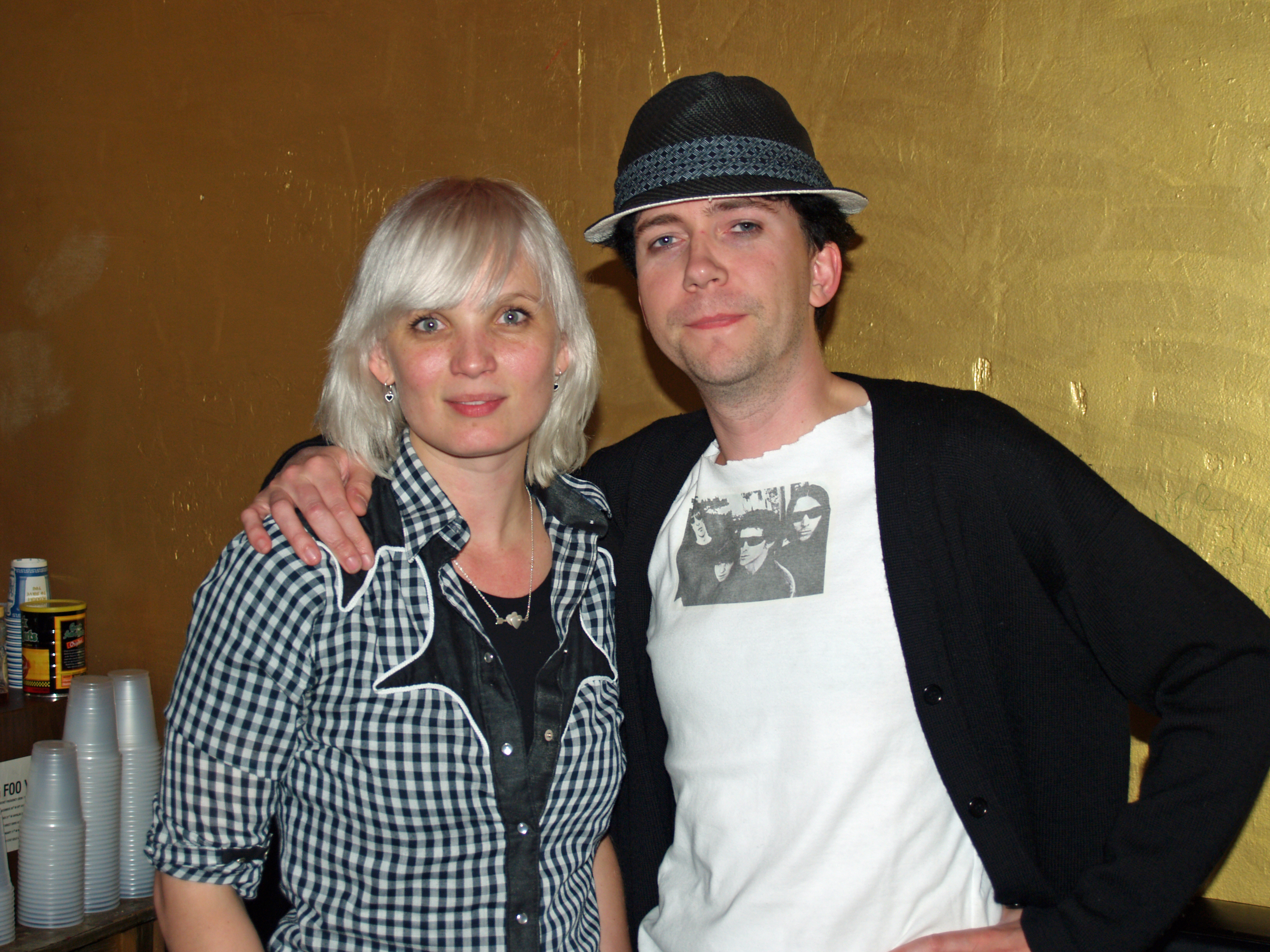

Background information
- Origin: Copenhagen, Denmark
- Genres: Indie rock; noise pop; garage rock; shoegazing; post-punk revival
- Years active: 2001–2018; 2022–present
- Labels: Crunchy Frog; Columbia; Fierce Panda; Vice; Universal
- Members: Sune Rose Wagner; Sharin Foo
- Website: theraveonettes.com

The Raveonettes are a Danish indie rock duo, consisting of Sune Rose Wagner on guitar, instruments and vocals, and Sharin Foo on bass, guitar and vocals. Their music is characterized by close two-part vocal harmonies inspired by The Everly Brothers coupled with hard-edged electric guitar overlaid with liberal doses of noise. Their songs juxtapose the structural and chordal simplicity of 1950s and 1960s rock with intense electric instrumentation, driving beats, and often dark lyrical content (e.g., crime, drugs, murder, suicide, love, lust, and betrayal), drawing from another of the band's influences, The Velvet Underground.

== Biography ==
=== Early years ===
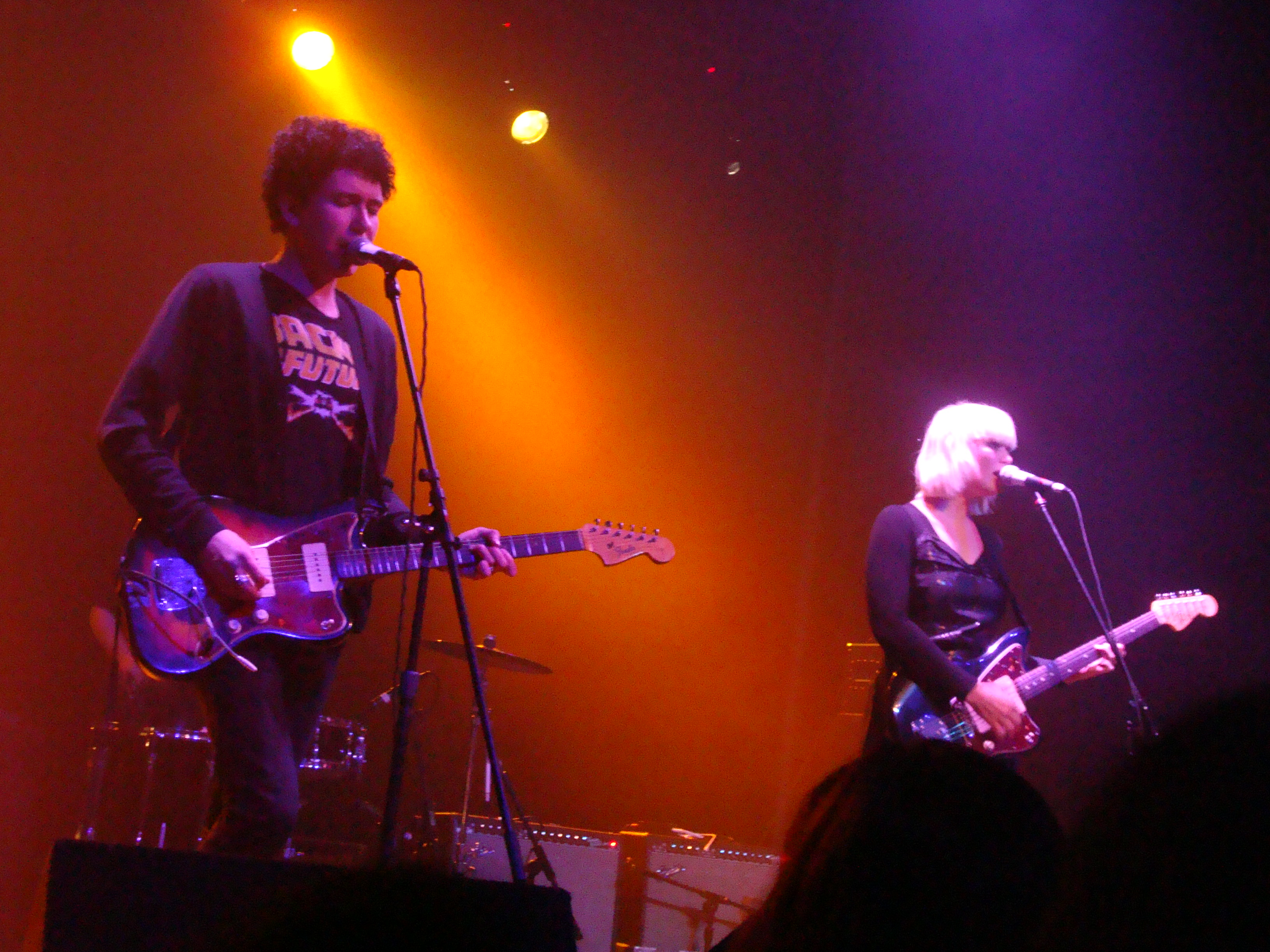
The Raveonettes playing at The Music Box @ The Fonda

The duo met in Copenhagen and, after forming the band, began recording Whip It On at Once Was & Sauna Recording Studio, a former Sony Studios facility. They booked the studio for three weeks during non-session down time late in 2001 and handled all production chores themselves. Adding guitarist Manoj Ramdas and jazz drummer Jakob Hoyer, The Raveonettes booked one of their first gigs at the SPOT festival in Aarhus, the second largest city in Denmark. After the release of Whip It On on the seminal Danish Crunchy Frog label, Hoyer and Ramdas would contribute to the next three Raveonettes albums, along with other additional musicians. However, by the time Lust Lust Lust was released in 2007, Sune and Sharin would be the only two musicians credited, showing a return to the dynamic around the time of the mini-album.

Officially,the band was discovered by Rolling Stone editor David Fricke at the SPOT festival, and his rave review of the duo immediately resulted in a number of offers from major labels. Unofficially, the band discovered that David Fricke would be present at the SPOT festival, and they rushed a band together and headed for the festival. The band is managed by Richard Gottehrer, who has been with them from the start.

Whip It On was named "Best Rock Album of the Year" at the Danish Music Awards (Denmark's Grammy equivalent) on 1 March 2003, while The Raveonettes were picked by Rolling Stone and Q Magazine as being among the harbingers of the "Next Wave" of contemporary music.

In 2006, Blender named Sharin Foo one of rock's hottest women, alongside Courtney Love, Joan Jett and Liz Phair.

=== Chain Gang of Love ===
The band's first full-length album, Chain Gang of Love, was produced by Richard Gottehrer and The Raveonettes' own Sune Rose Wagner. The album was recorded in Denmark and New York from 9–17 October, 6–12 November, and 4–10 December 2002, and mixed in London in early 2003. The thirteen songs on Chain Gang of Love are written by Sune Rose Wagner with the exception of "That Great Love Sound", which Sune co-wrote with Gottehrer. Portions of this song were featured in a U.S. ad for Kmart. The album is notable in that all the songs were written in the key B-flat major.

=== Pretty in Black ===
The band's follow-up album, Pretty in Black, broadened their musical palette, featuring guest vocals from Ronnie Spector of The Ronettes as well as guest instrumental spots from Maureen Tucker (of The Velvet Underground) and Martin Rev (of Suicide). This was their first album in which Sharin Foo did not play bass; instead, The Raveonettes added bass player Anders Christensen, who had toured with seminal jazz drummer Paul Motian, amongst others. Christensen recorded on the album and toured with the band. At the end of the 2005 tour, guitar player Manoj Ramdas left the band to concentrate on his new band SPEKTR.

The video for the single "Love in a Trashcan", directed by Peder Pedersen, features pink bars and blocks with words like "Vamp" and "Teaser" scrolling by the band members, and is reminiscent of an early-1960s cosmetic ad.

=== Lust Lust Lust ===
The duo's third studio album, Lust Lust Lust, was released in November 2007 in Europe and February 2008 in the U.S. The album received generally positive reviews, with the NME's Hardeep Phull describing it as "their most engrossing album."

In December 2008, Sune Rose Wagner released a solo album, simply titled Sune Rose Wagner. All of the songs are sung in his native language of Danish.

=== In and Out of Control ===
The Raveonettes' fourth album, In and Out of Control, was released 6 October 2009, with "Last Dance" released as the lead-off single. The album was co-written and produced by Thomas Troelsen. Both "Last Dance" and "Suicide", another song from the album, have been featured on The CW's Gossip Girl.

=== Raven in the Grave ===
Raven in the Grave, The Raveonettes' fifth album, was released 4 April 2011. The album has produced three singles to date.

=== Observator ===
The duo released a new album, titled Observator, on 11 September 2012. The lead single 'Observations' was released 25 June. The second single 'She Owns the Streets' was released 9 July.

=== Pe'ahi ===
The band's seventh album, Pe'ahi, was released 22 July 2014. Due to the purposeful lack of promotion or formal announcement of a release date the album was dubbed a "surprise" release.

=== 2016 Atomized (Anti-Album), hiatus, return and The Raveonettes Sing… ===
In 2015 the band announced the Rave-Sound-of-the-Month saying that in every month of 2016 the band were recording and releasing a new song. Dubbed by the band as the Anti-Album, the twelve songs were released individually for download online in each month of the year and were released 21 April 2017 as a full album titled 2016 Atomized.

In March 2018 the band released a song called "Ghost", recorded during the 2016 Atomized project.

The duo then went on an "indefinite hiatus" to allow Sune to release a solo album in 2018, though this never materialized.

In November 2020, the band released the song "Snowstorm", their first release in over two years. The band returned to touring in 2022, performing their EP Whip It On in full at various festivals throughout the summer as well as a tour at the end of the year. New music is also in the works, with a new album completed in late 2023. The band released their ninth studio album, The Raveonettes Sing…, on 19 July 2024. The album, according to the press release, is a "collection of some of the songs that inspired us to start the band". The album's release was preceded by its first single, a cover of the Gram Parsons song, "Return of the Grievous Angel", on 17 May 2024. The album's second single, a cover of The Everly Brothers song "All I Have to Do Is Dream", was released on 29 May 2024.

=== Pe'ahi II ===
The band's tenth studio album, Pe'ahi II, was released on 25 April 2025. It continues the thematic thread of their 2014 album Pe'ahi, which explores themes of life's fragility, death, longing, and vulnerability. The album was recorded in Nashville, Los Angeles, and Copenhagen. The album's first single, "Blackest", was released on 28 February 2025. The album's second single, "Killer", was released on 28 March 2025.

== Instruments ==
During live performances, the band usually plays Fender instruments (Sune uses a number of Jazzmasters while Sharin opts for either Mustang or jazz bass, and a Jazzmaster). Sune plays a number of different guitars and basses on their albums, including different Fenders, Gibsons, and Gretsches. In the fall of 2005, the tour van containing the band's equipment (including Sune's prized 1960 Jazzmaster and Sharin's treasured Gretsch 6120) was stolen during their tour of the U.S.A.

== Band line-up by album ==
=== Chain Gang of Love line-up ===
- Sune Rose Wagner: guitars and vocals
- Sharin Foo: bass and vocals
- Manoj Ramdas: guitars
- Jakob Hoyer: drums

=== Pretty in Black line-up ===
- Sune Rose Wagner: guitars, vocals, synth, percussion, drums, bass, and programming
- Sharin Foo: vocals and percussion
- Jakob Hoyer: drums and percussion
- Anders Christensen: bass, percussion, and organ
- Manoj Ramdas: guitar

=== Subsequent line-up ===
- Sune Rose Wagner: instruments and vocals
- Sharin Foo: vocals

== Discography ==
=== Studio albums ===
| Year | Album details | Peak chart positions | | | | | | | Certifications |
| Year | Album details | DEN | BEL | FRA | NLD | SWE | UK | US | Certifications |
|---|---|---|---|---|---|---|---|---|---|
| 2003 | Chain Gang of Love: Released: 23 August 2003; Label: Columbia Records | 5 | — | 120 | 81 | 53 | 43 | 123 | |
| 2005 | Pretty in Black: Released: 25 April 2005; Label: Columbia Records | 3 | 61 | 109 | — | — | 71 | 152 | DEN: Gold |
| 2007 | Lust Lust Lust: Released: 12 November 2007; Label: Vice Records | 20 | — | — | — | — | — | 108 | |
| 2009 | In and Out of Control: Released: 5 October 2009; Label: Vice Records | 5 | 96 | — | — | — | — | 126 | |
| 2011 | Raven in the Grave: Released: 4 April 2011; Label: Vice Records | 4 | — | — | — | — | — | 126 | |
| 2012 | Observator: Released: 11 September 2012; Label: Vice Records | 7 | 188 | — | — | — | — | 110 | |
| 2014 | Pe'ahi: Released: 22 July 2014; Label: Beat Dies Records | 4 | 169 | — | — | — | — | 161 | |
| 2017 | 2016 Atomized: Released: 21 February 2017; Label: Beat Dies Records | — | — | — | — | — | — | — | |
| 2024 | The Raveonettes Sing…: Released: 19 July 2024; Label: Cleopatra Records | — | — | — | — | — | — | — | |
| 2025 | Pe'ahi II: Released: 25 April 2025; Label: Beat Dies Records | — | — | — | — | — | — | — | |
"—" denotes releases that did not chart.

Notes

^{1} Lust Lust Lust's inclusion of 3D glasses rendered it ineligible for the UK Albums Chart.

=== EPs ===
- Whip It On (6 August 2002) (UK No. 114)
- Sometimes They Drop By (23 September 2008)
- Beauty Dies (21 October 2008)
- Wishing You a Rave Christmas (25 November 2008)
- Into the Night (24 April 2012) (DEN No. 36)
- The End (23 July 2015)

=== Compilations ===
- Rarities/B-Sides (15 December 2011)

=== Singles ===
| Year | Title | Chart positions | | | Album |
| Year | Title | DEN | UK | UK Ind | Album |
|---|---|---|---|---|---|
| 2002 | "Attack of the Ghost Riders" | — | 73 | — | Whip It On |
| 2003 | "Beat City" | — | 83 | — | Whip It On |
| 2003 | "That Great Love Sound" | — | 34 | — | Chain Gang of Love |
| 2003 | "Heartbreak Stroll" | 3 | 49 | — | Chain Gang of Love |
| 2003 | "The Christmas Song" | — | — | — | Maybe This Christmas Tree |
| 2004 | "That Great Love Sound" (re-issue) | — | 52 | — | Chain Gang of Love |
| 2005 | "Ode to LA" | — | 78 | — | Pretty in Black |
| 2005 | "Love in a Trashcan" | — | 26 | — | Pretty in Black |
| 2007 | "Dead Sound" | — | — | — | Lust Lust Lust |
| 2008 | "You Want the Candy" | — | — | 15 | Lust Lust Lust |
| 2008 | "Aly, Walk with Me" | — | — | — | Lust Lust Lust |
| 2008 | "Blush" | — | — | — | Lust Lust Lust |
| 2008 | "Black/White" | — | — | — | Beauty Dies |
| 2009 | "Bang!" | — | — | — | In and Out of Control |
| 2009 | "Last Dance" | 24 | — | — | In and Out of Control |
| 2010 | "Heart of Stone" | — | — | — | In and Out of Control |
| 2010 | "Gone Forever" | — | — | — | In and Out of Control |
| 2011 | "Recharge & Revolt" | — | — | — | Raven in the Grave |
| 2011 | "Apparitions" | — | — | — | Raven in the Grave |
| 2011 | "Let Me on Out" | — | — | — | Raven in the Grave |
| 2012 | "Observations" | — | — | — | Observator |
| 2012 | "She Owns the Streets" | — | — | — | Observator |
| 2012 | "The Enemy" | — | — | — | Observator |
| 2012 | "Curse the Night" | — | — | — | Observator |
| 2014 | "Endless Sleeper" | — | — | — | Pe'ahi |
| 2014 | "Killer in the Streets" | — | — | — | Pe'ahi |
| 2018 | "Ghost" | — | — | — | |
| 2020 | "Snowstorm" | — | — | — | |
| 2024 | "Return of the Grievous Angel" | — | — | — | The Raveonettes Sing… |
| 2024 | "All I Have to Do Is Dream" | — | — | — | The Raveonettes Sing… |
| 2025 | "Blackest" | — | — | — | Pe'ahi II |
| 2025 | "Killer" | — | — | — | Pe'ahi II |

=== Soundtracks and compilations ===
- FIFA 2004 (2003) with "That Great Love Sound"
- Driv3r (2004) with "Bowels of the Beast"
- Maybe This Christmas Tree, "The Christmas Song" (2004)
- Stubbs the Zombie: The Soundtrack (2005) with "My Boyfriend's Back" (cover of The Angels' #1 hit)
- Nordkraft – Original Soundtrack (2005) with "Beat City"
- Amnesty International's Instant Karma (2007) with "One Day at a Time" (John Lennon cover, download only)
- Whip It! Soundtrack (2009) with "Dead Sound"
- Drive Angry Soundtrack (2011) with "You Want the Candy"
- Batman: Arkham City (2011) with "Oh, Stranger"
- Catch .44 Soundtrack (2011) with "Dead Sound"
- Van God Los de serie (2012) with "Evil Seeds"
- Lockout (2012) with "Beat City"
- A Psych Tribute to the Doors (2014) with "The End" (The Doors cover)
- American Honey (2016) with "Recharge & Revolt"
- Can't Get You Out of My Head (2021) with "Recharge & Revolt"
