= Sune Rose Wagner =

Danish singer-songwriter and guitarist

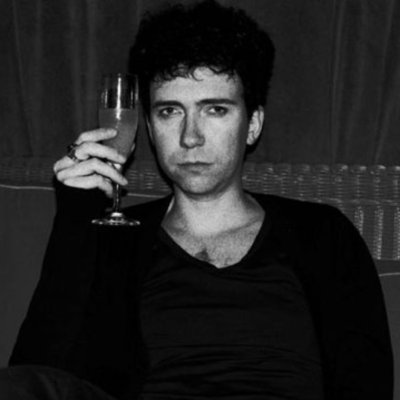

Background information
- Born: 24 July 1973 (age 52)
- Origin: Sønderborg, Denmark
- Genres: Garage rock, indie rock, noise pop, surf rock
- Instruments: guitar, piano
- Years active: 1989–present
- Labels: Auditorium, Columbia, Vice
- Formerly of: Psyched Up Janis, The Raveonettes, The Tremolo Beer Gut, Western Front

Sune Rose Wagner (born 24 July 1973) is a Danish songwriter, guitarist, and singer, best known for playing in the rock group The Raveonettes. In addition to his own bands, Wagner has produced, recorded, and mixed albums by acts such as Dum Dum Girls, Crocodiles, and Louise Burns.

== Biography ==
Wagner was born in Sønderborg, and formed the group Western Front in Sønderborg in August 1989; by 1992, the band had relocated to Copenhagen and evolved into Psyched Up Janis, with whom he recorded five albums. The band eventually moved to Brighton, and then to the United States, then split up in 1999 after playing a farewell concert at the Roskilde Festival. He had formed The Tremolo Beer Gut in 1998, and then formed his most successful band, The Raveonettes, with Sharin Foo after settling in Los Angeles. From 1999 to 2000, he also worked as an assistant for photographer Søren Solkær Starbird.

Wagner released his first (self-titled) solo album in 2008 (also his first album sung in Danish), followed by live performances in 2009. In 2010, he released a single with fellow Sønderborg musician Michael Falch, a reworking of Falch's song "Nu Rider Vi Stormen Af".

== Solo discography ==
=== Albums ===
- Sune Rose Wagner (2008, Auditorium)

=== Singles ===
- "Hvad Der Sker" (2008, Auditorium)
- "Nu Rider Vi Stormen Af" with Michael Falch (2010, KrebsFalch)
- "Ambush" (2018, Juvenile Delinquent Music)
- "After All" (2018, Juvenile Delinquent Music)

=== Soundtrack appearances ===
- "When Will I Be Loved" (with Steen Jørgensen) and "Sleepwalk" on Songs for a Soundtrack - The Original Motion Picture Soundtrack for Simon & Malou (2009, Mermaid Records)
- "Let My Baby Ride" and "More Human than Human" on Altered Carbon (2018, Lakeshore Records)

=== Production ===
- Dum Dum Girls, Only in Dreams LP (2011, Sub Pop)
- Dum Dum Girls, He Gets Me High EP (2011, Sub Pop)
- Dum Dum Girls, End of Daze EP (2012, Sub Pop)
- Louise Burns, The Midnight Mass LP (2013, Light Organ Records)
- Crocodiles, Crimes of Passion LP (2013, Frenchkiss Records)
- Dum Dum Girls, Too True LP (2014, Sub Pop)
- Gateway Drugs, PSA LP (2020, Future Shock Records)
