= True Skov =

Woodland in Denmark

Coordinates: 56°10′18″N 10°04′15″E

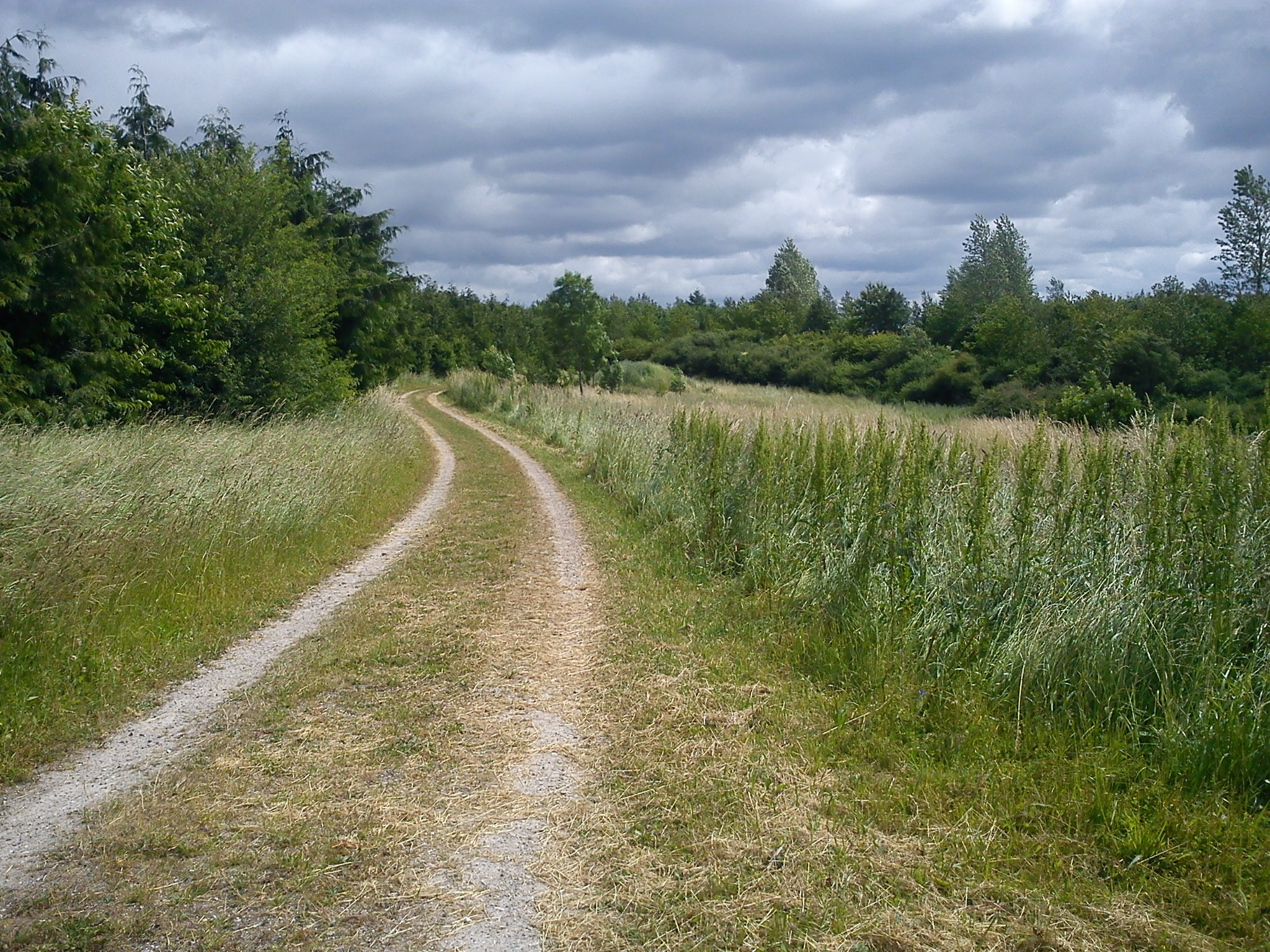
True Skov.

True Skov (True Forest) is a 385 hectares (950 acres) woodland, west of Skjoldhøjkilen in Aarhus, Denmark.

True Skov is named after the small village of True and forms part of the New Forests of Aarhus. It is a relatively recent afforestation - and the largest within the region of Søhøjlandet -, raised primarily in 1994 on former agricultural fields. New trees are still being planted here occasionally and the forest is planned to cover a total of 650 ha, in the future.

Although located entirely within Aarhus Municipality, True Skov is administered by the State of Denmark.

== Nature and facilities ==
True Skov is primarily a deciduous forest, but with conifers and pines in some sections. Alder, poplar and larch has been planted as nursing trees for the young forest. The forest holds a great variety of species, focussing primarily on native species and a number of bush and shrub species has been planted at the forest edges. A section in the western parts, known as Little America, holds North American tree species exclusively, as part of forestry research and to make the forest more interesting altogether.

A network of pathways cuts through the otherwise dense plantations of True Skov. Motor vehicles are not allowed, but the pathways are used for a range of activities like strolling, horseback trotting, jogging and cross-country skiing in the winter. The north western parts holds a sail plane landing strip and caution is advised here. True Skov has two fenced areas dedicated to exercising dogs. Such areas are known as hundeskove (lit.: dogs-forests) in Denmark and they can be found across the country, often situated close to towns and villages.

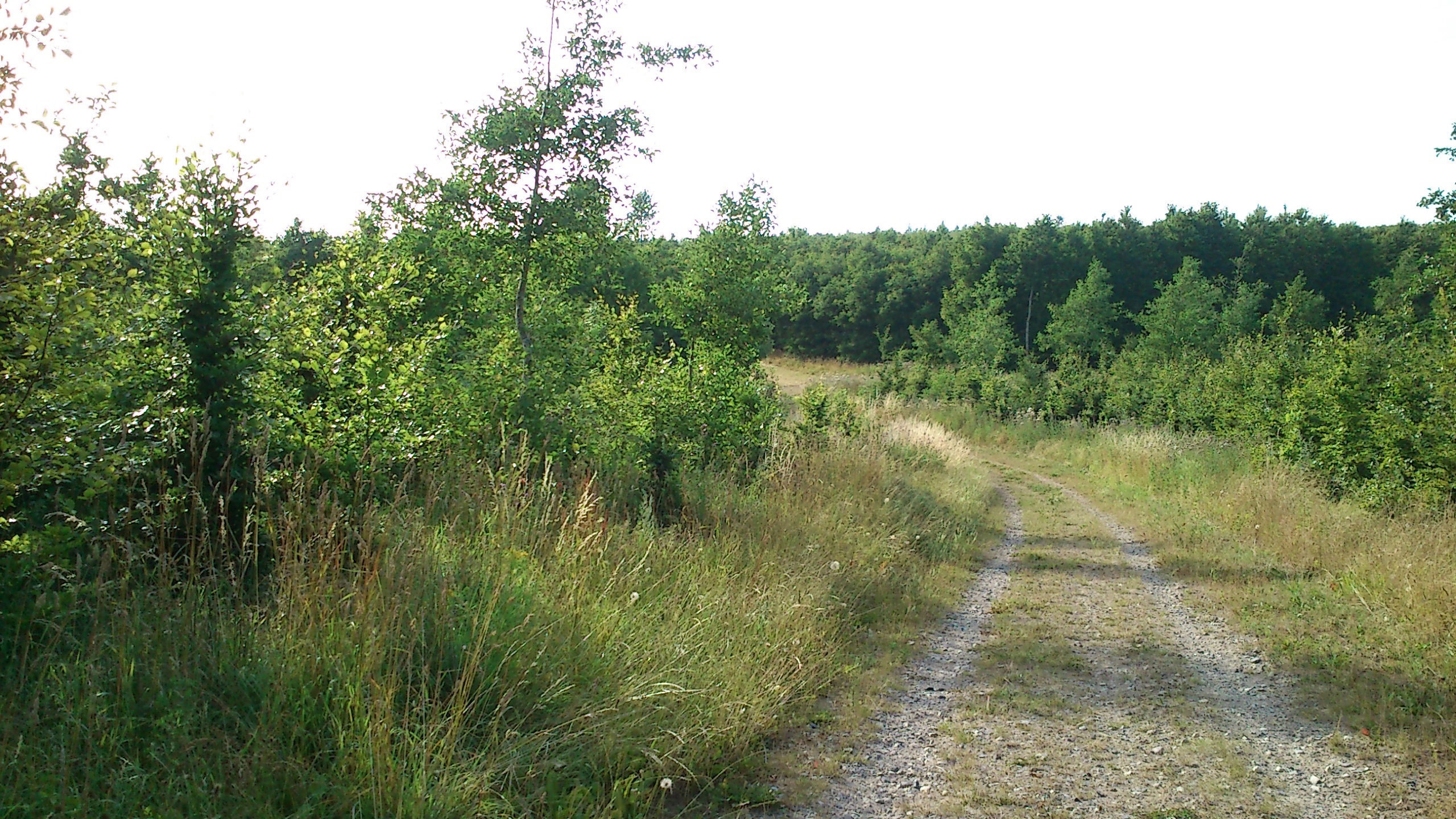
View across the southern parts of True Skov.

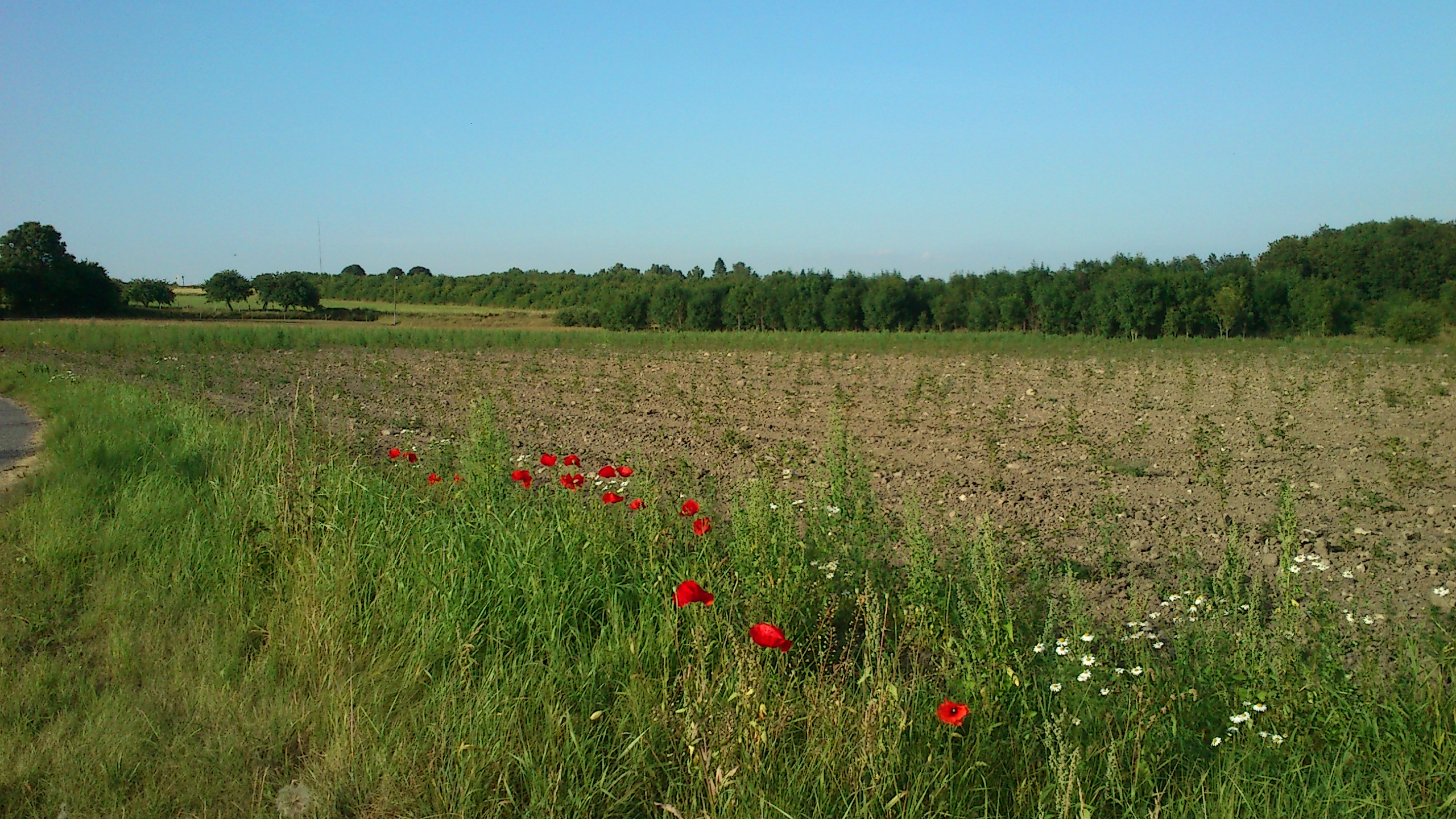
Recent plantations. Beech.

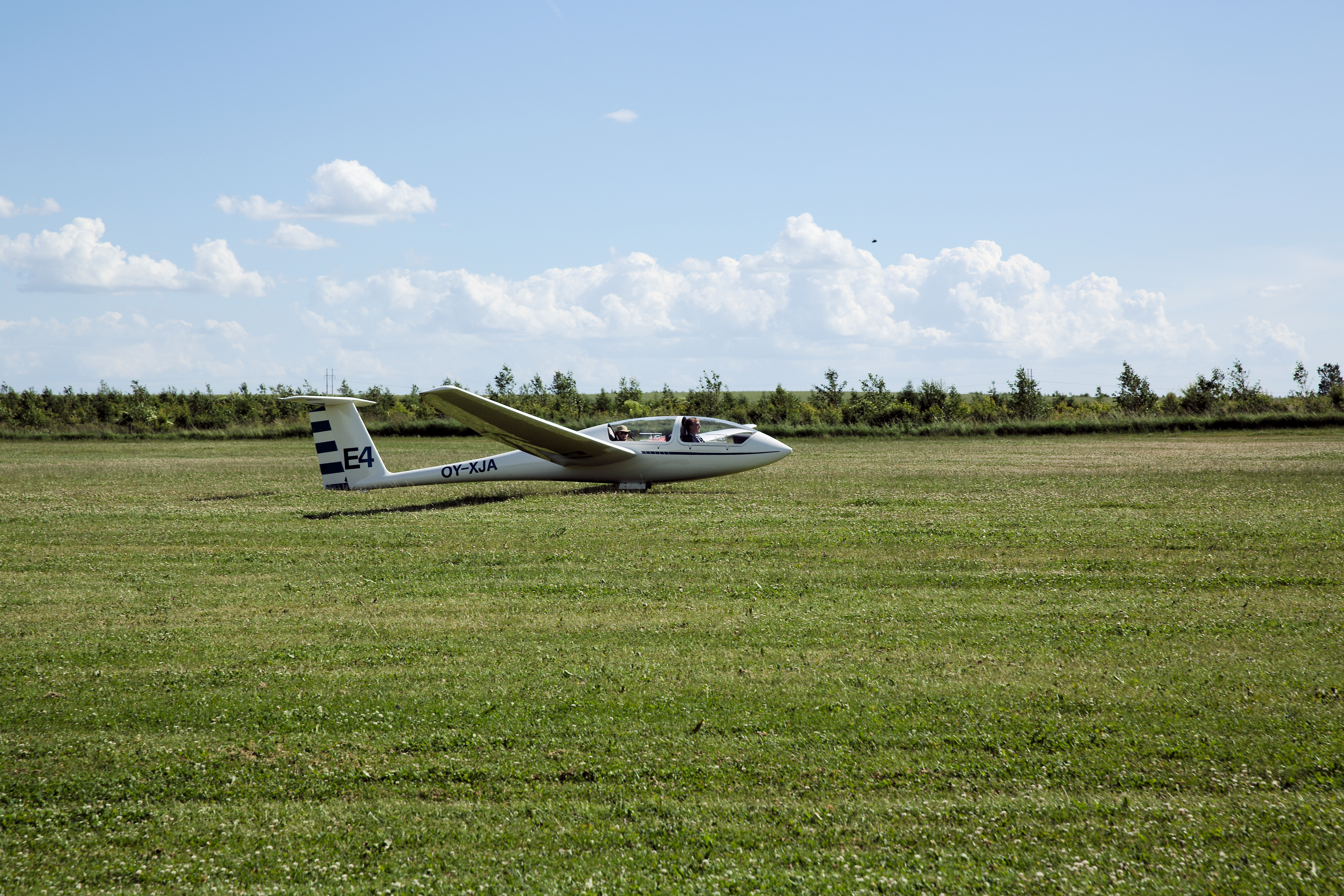
A sail plane landing on the air-fields.

== Sources ==
- True Skov Danish Nature Agency (in Danish)
- Danish Nature Agency (2006): True Skov ved Århus, The Environmental Ministry of Denmark (in Danish)
