= Skjoldhøjkilen =

Danish recreational and natural site

Coordinates: 56.169°N 10.126°E

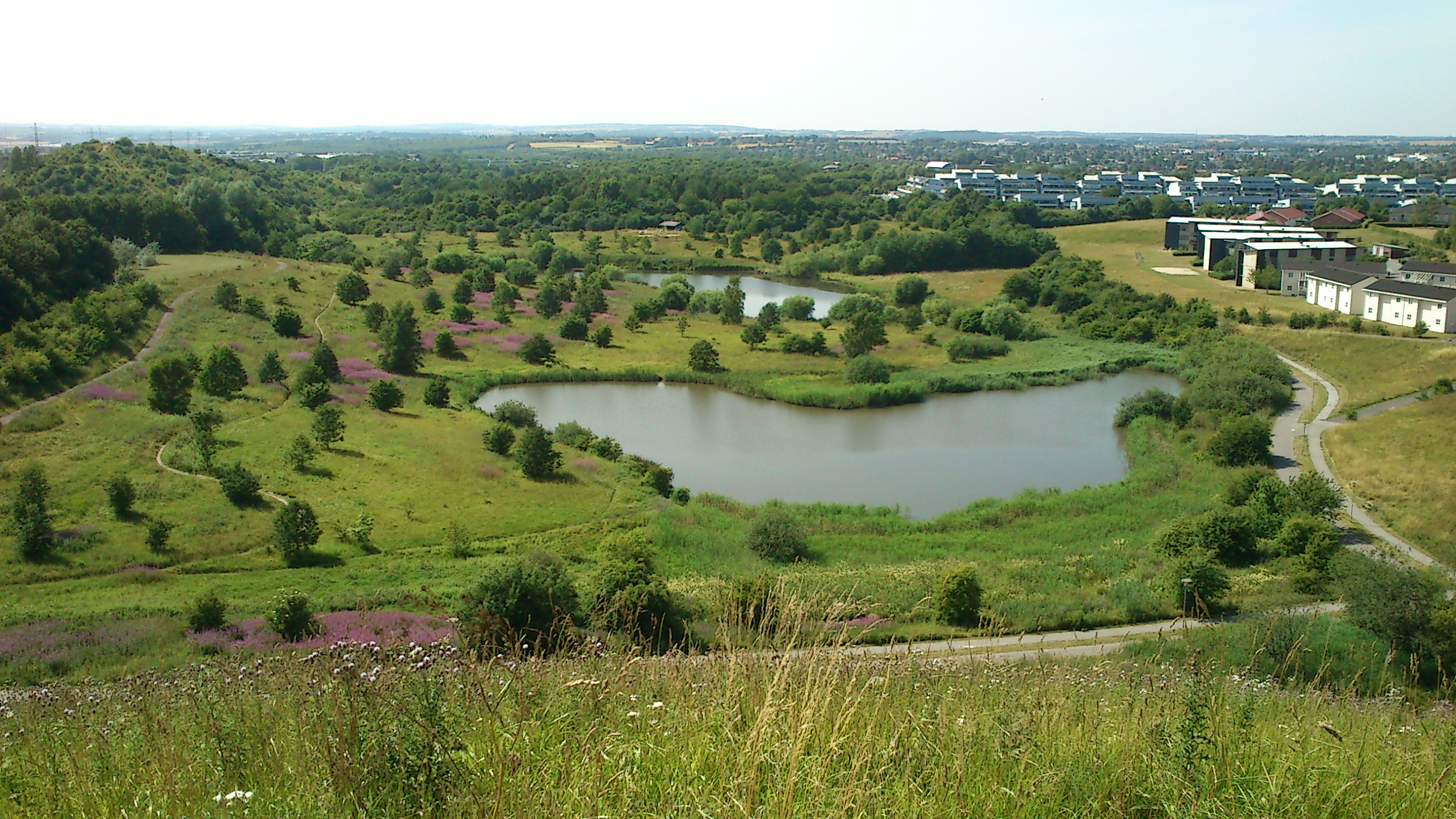
A view of Skjoldhøjkilen.

Skjoldhøjkilen is a recreational and natural site, in the district of Brabrand in the western part of Aarhus in Denmark. It stretches westwards from Hasle Hills, like a wavy green strip of meadows, small lakes and woodlands. It is 3.5 km long and just as Hasle Hills, it is administered by the self-governing institution 'Hasle Bakker'.

== Reconstruction ==
The landscape and nature of Skjoldhøjkilen was recently restored and recreated in a series of five construction projects finished in 2005. The projects comprised afforestations, restoration of the stream of Voldbækken, construction of multipurpose rainwater reservoirs, and various road constructions. As a consequence, Skjoldhøjkilen now constitutes a connected woodland area with the newly raised 650 hectares (1,600 acres) forest of True Skov to the west, thereby constituting a large green wedge of nature cutting its way into the city from the countryside. This is all part of the implementation of Aarhus Municipality's agenda "Aarhus surrounded by forests" and "The Green Mainstructure", initiated in 1988 and resulting in the New Forests of Aarhus. The total woodland-area of Skjoldhøjkilen and True Skov, is comparable in size to the Marselisborg Forests, south of Aarhus.

== The activity landscape ==
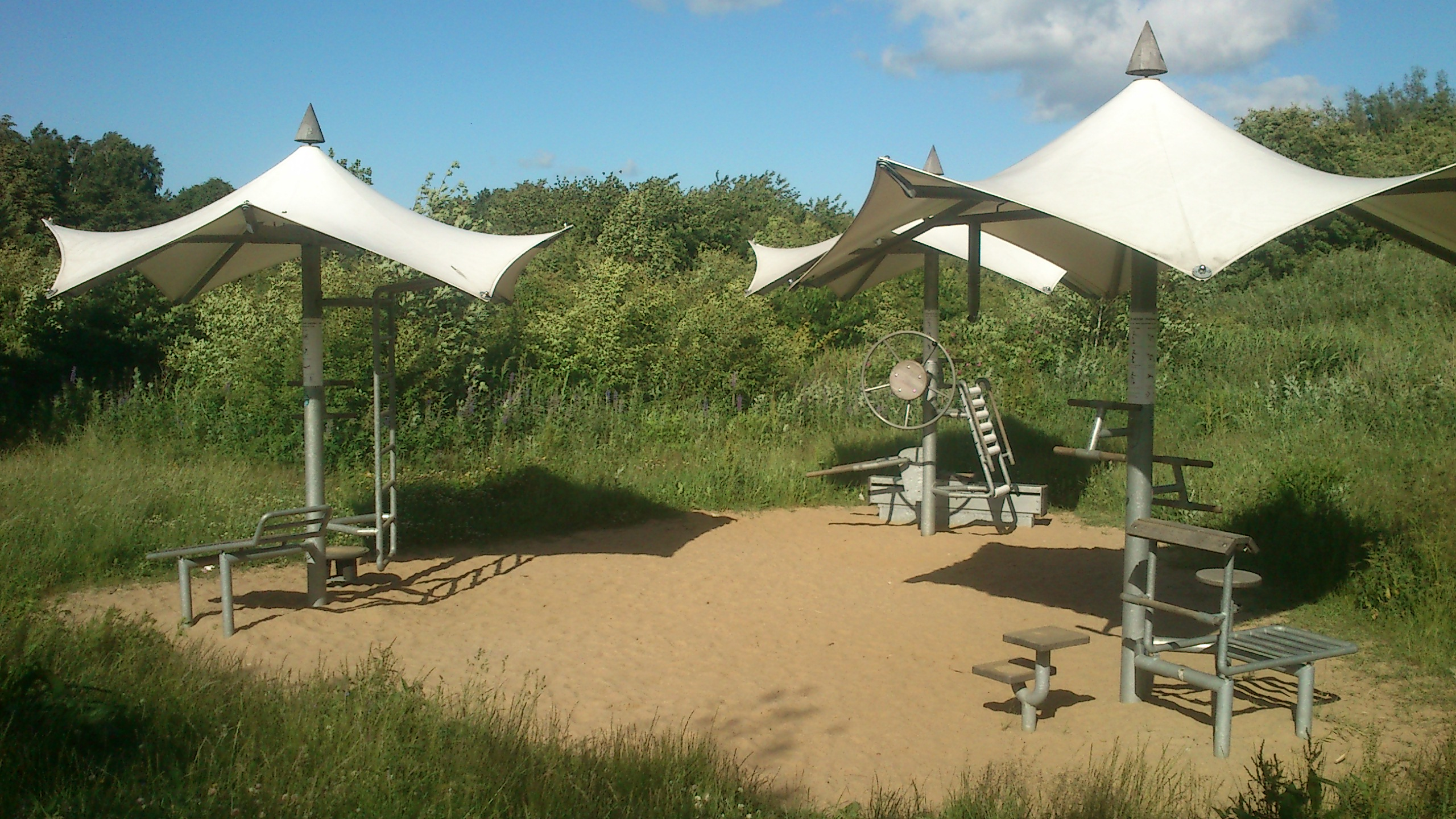
Free standing exercise apparatus.

Together with Hasle Hills, Skjoldhøjkilen forms a so-called 'activity landscape' and is so far the only one of its kind in Denmark. The activity landscape have been designed to facilitate play, learning, exercise and various recreational activities for citizens of all ages in Aarhus and the project have been financed by Realdania and the former Ministry for Integration. The activity landscape was inaugurated 25 May 2009.

As in Hasle Hills, Skjoldhøjkilen has established mountain bike routes, which are marked to avoid conflict with other users of the area. There are several play areas, exercise apparatus and public shelters, scattered across the landscape and the whole area is designed for public recreational use.

Every summer, the small music festival GrimFest is held at a private farm situated in Skjoldhøjkilen.

== Nature ==
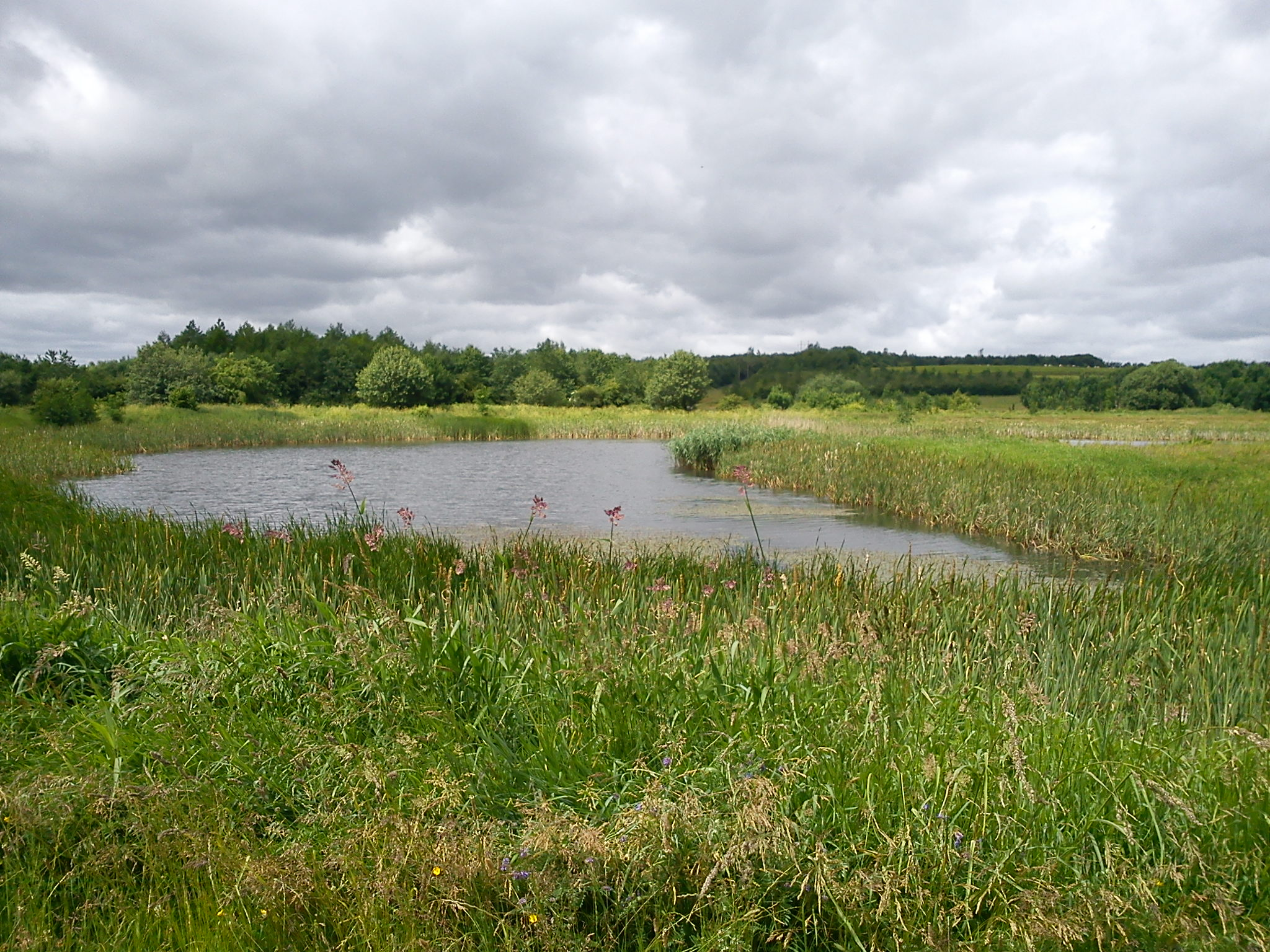
Some of the ponds in Skjoldhøjkilen are rainwater reservoirs, with an added environmental and recreational aspect.

The reconstruction and restorations of Skjoldhøjkilen has been successful in attracting and supporting a rich and varied flora and fauna in the area.

=== Wetlands ===
The stream of Voldbækken has been relieved from a burden of urban pollution and excessive nutrients, threatening the stream with eutrophication. These improvements now invites the brown trout in the Aarhus River to spawn here.

Some of the rainwater basins supports fish like common roach and abramis and various protected amphibians like northern crested newt. The wetlands attracts many species of insects and birds, with numerous ducks and Eurasian coots. Solitary grey herons are regularly seen here, hunting for fish.

Skjoldhøjkilen has a rich population of European tree frogs - which is uncommon in Denmark - and the soft, nutritious wet earth is popular with moles.

=== Alder swamp ===
There is an alder carr of black alder in Skjoldhøjkilen. Alder swamps are one of the primeval forest types of Denmark. Skjoldhøjkilen supports many species of the Corvidae and the alder swamp is home to a noisy colony of rooks.

== Gallery ==
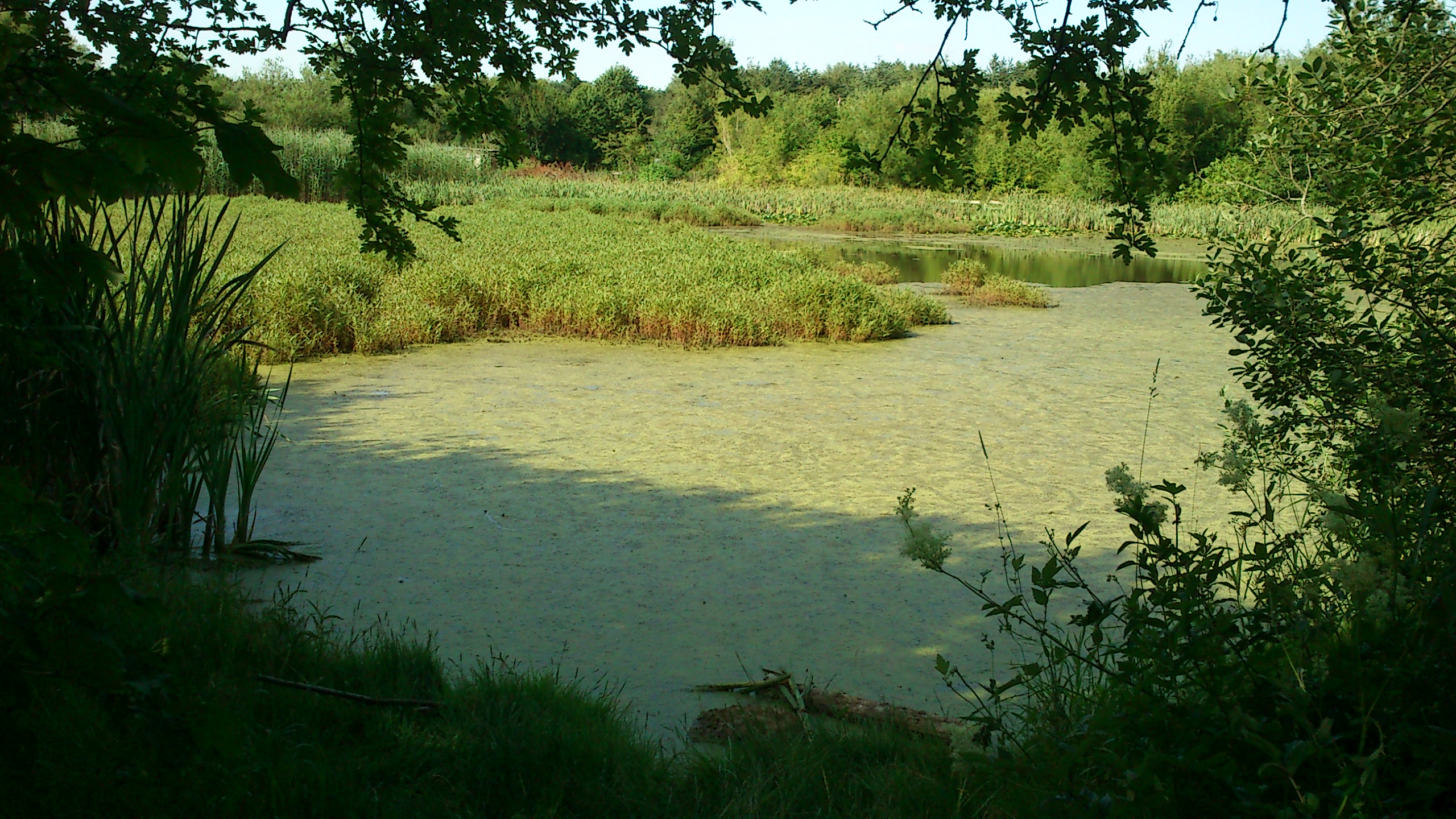
Skjoldhøjkilen is dotted with small ponds.

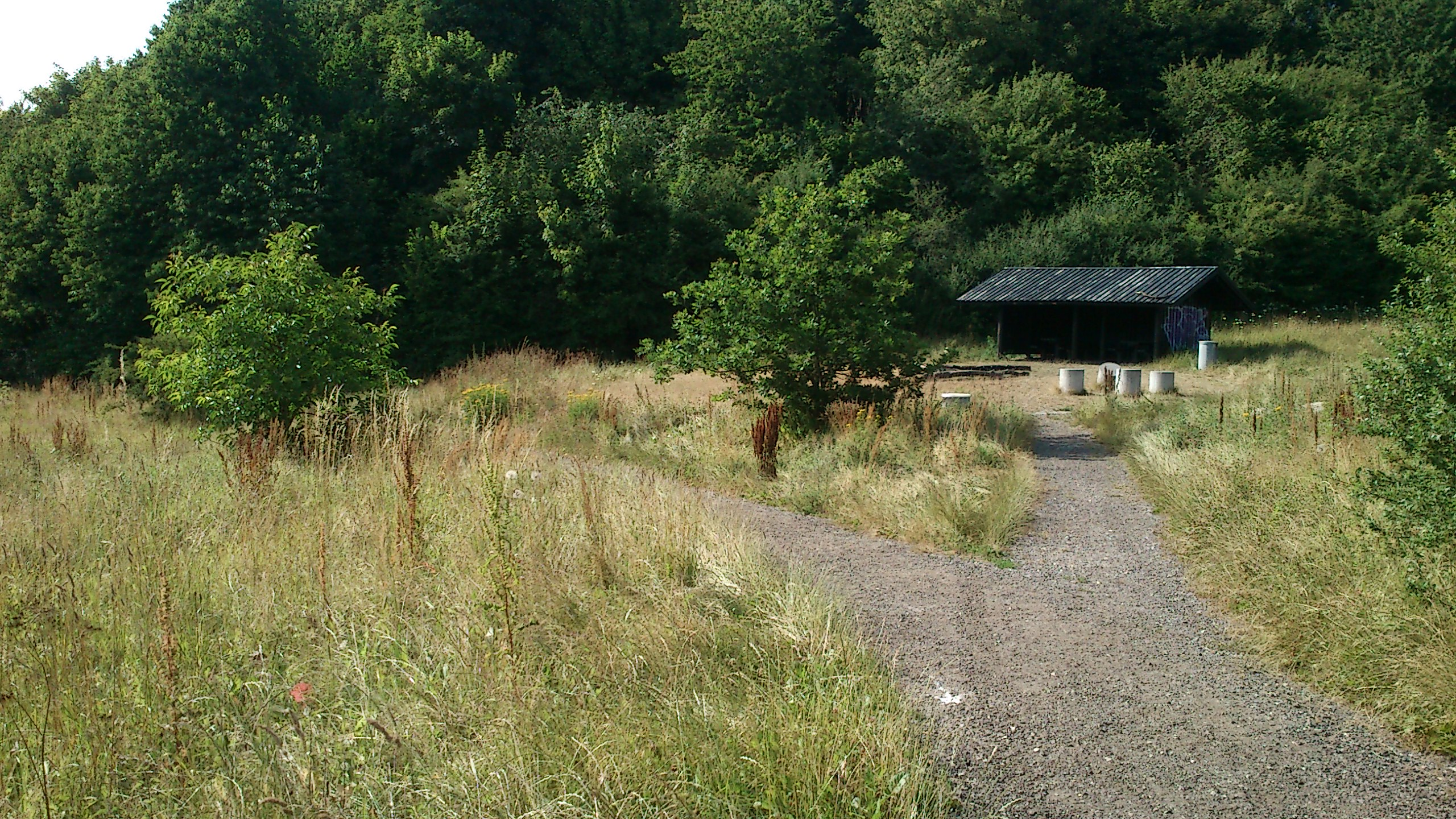
The area is used by a large array of institutions, organizations and citizens.

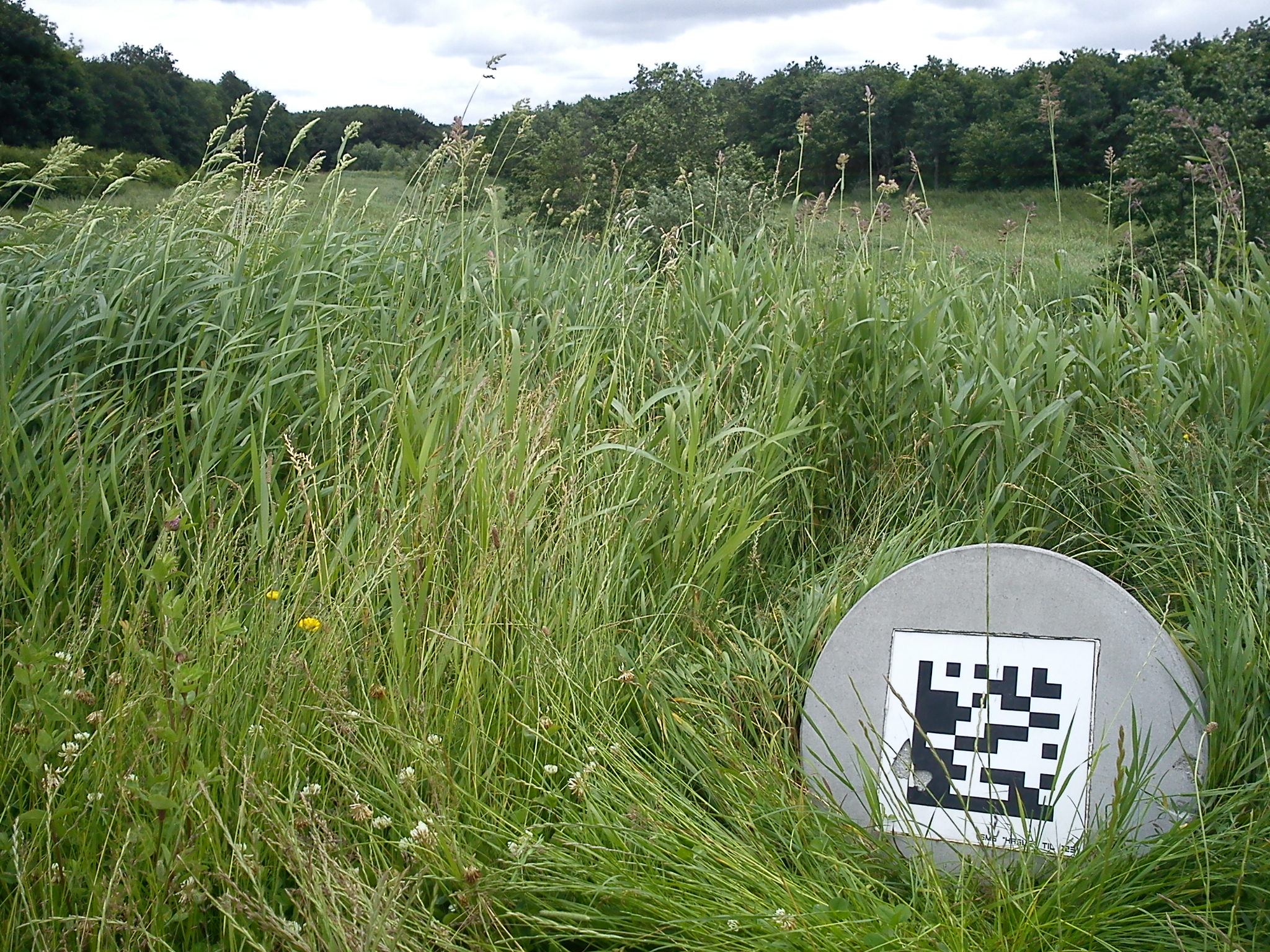
Graphical tags in the area are used for educational purposes.

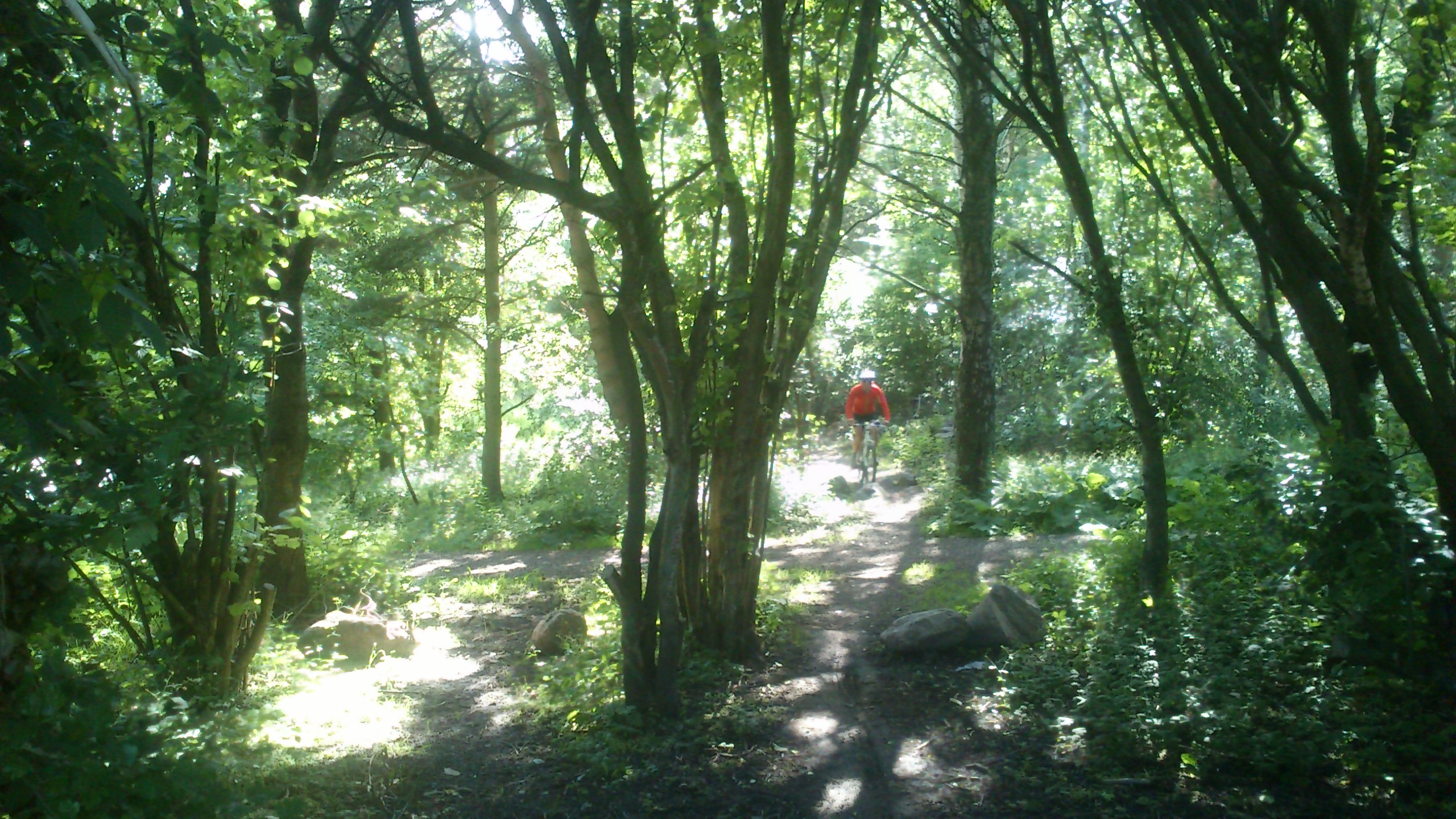
Mountain biking routes

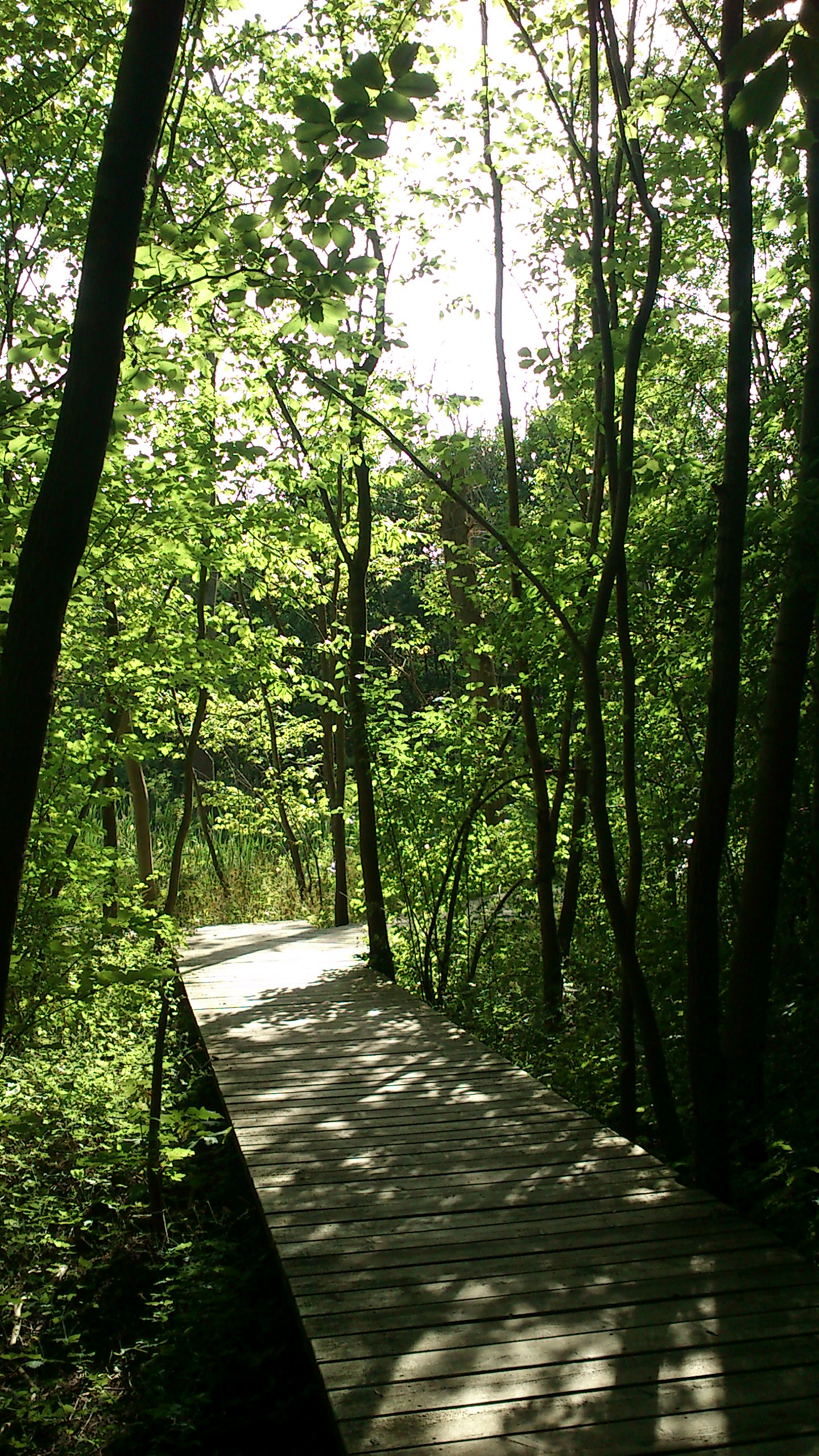
The alder swamp. One of the primeval forest types of Denmark.

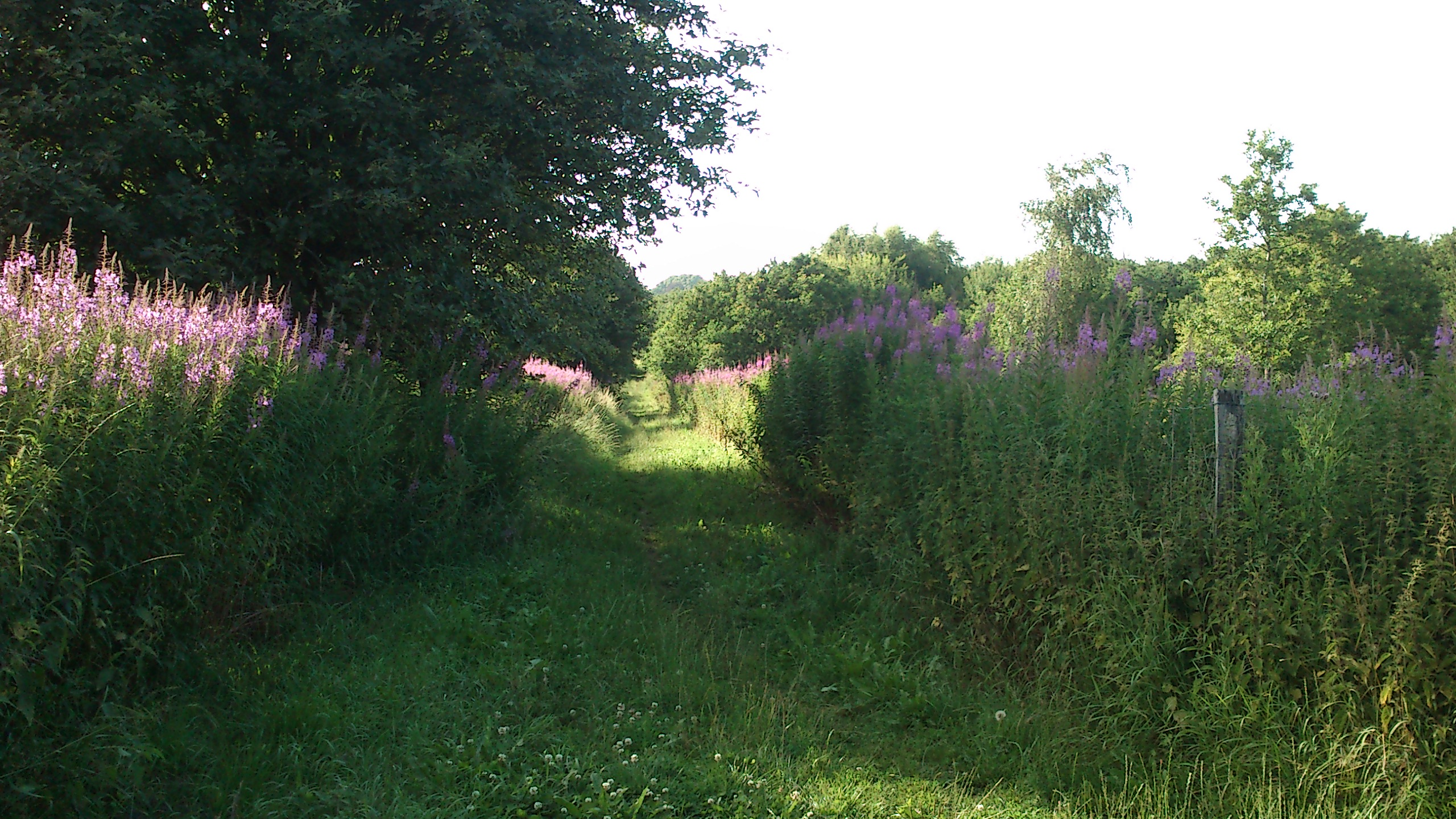
Although Skjoldhøjkilen is not a park in the usual sense, workers are constantly trimming and maintaining the area.

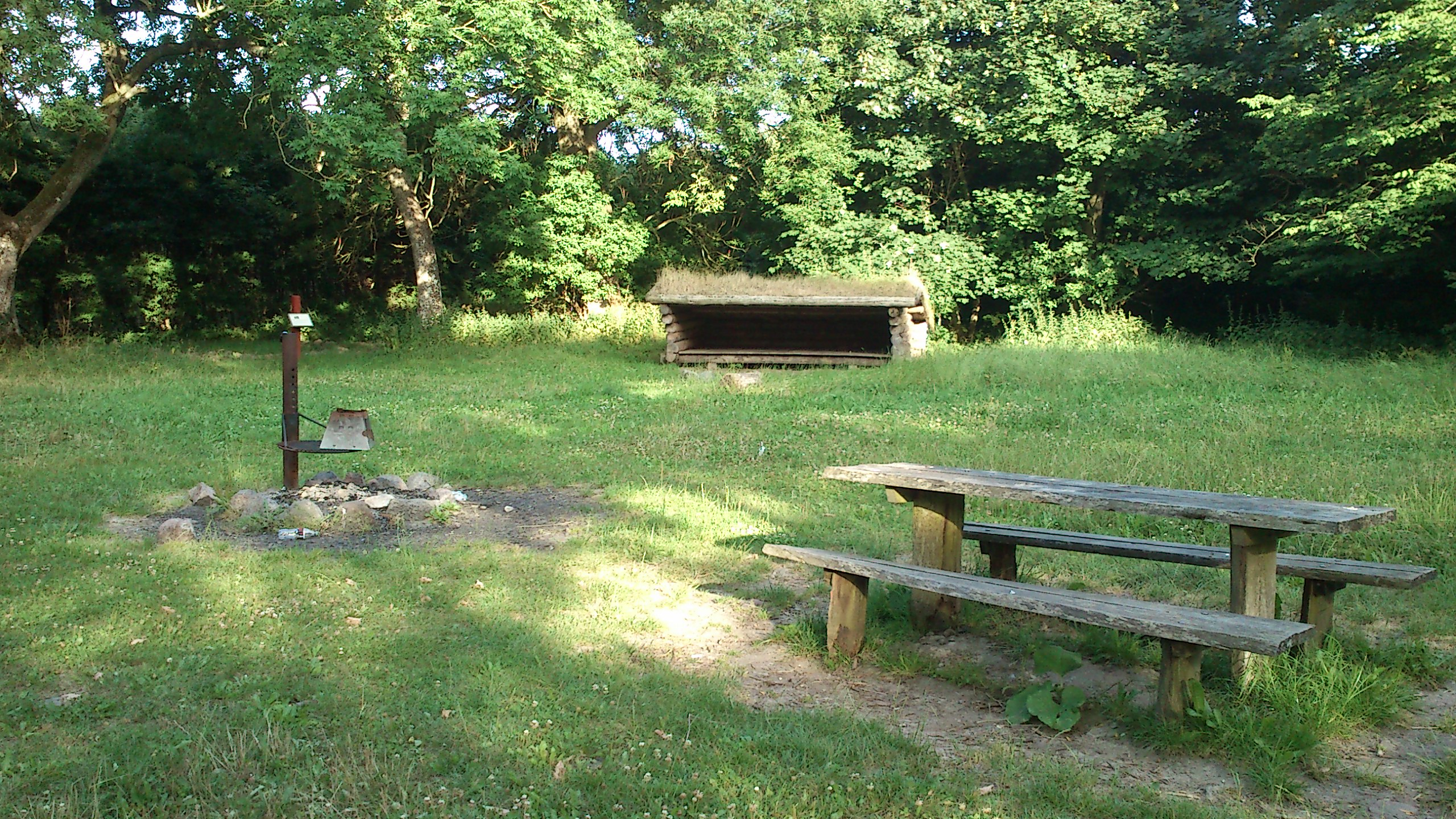
Shelters and a few fireplaces are here to facilitate camping.

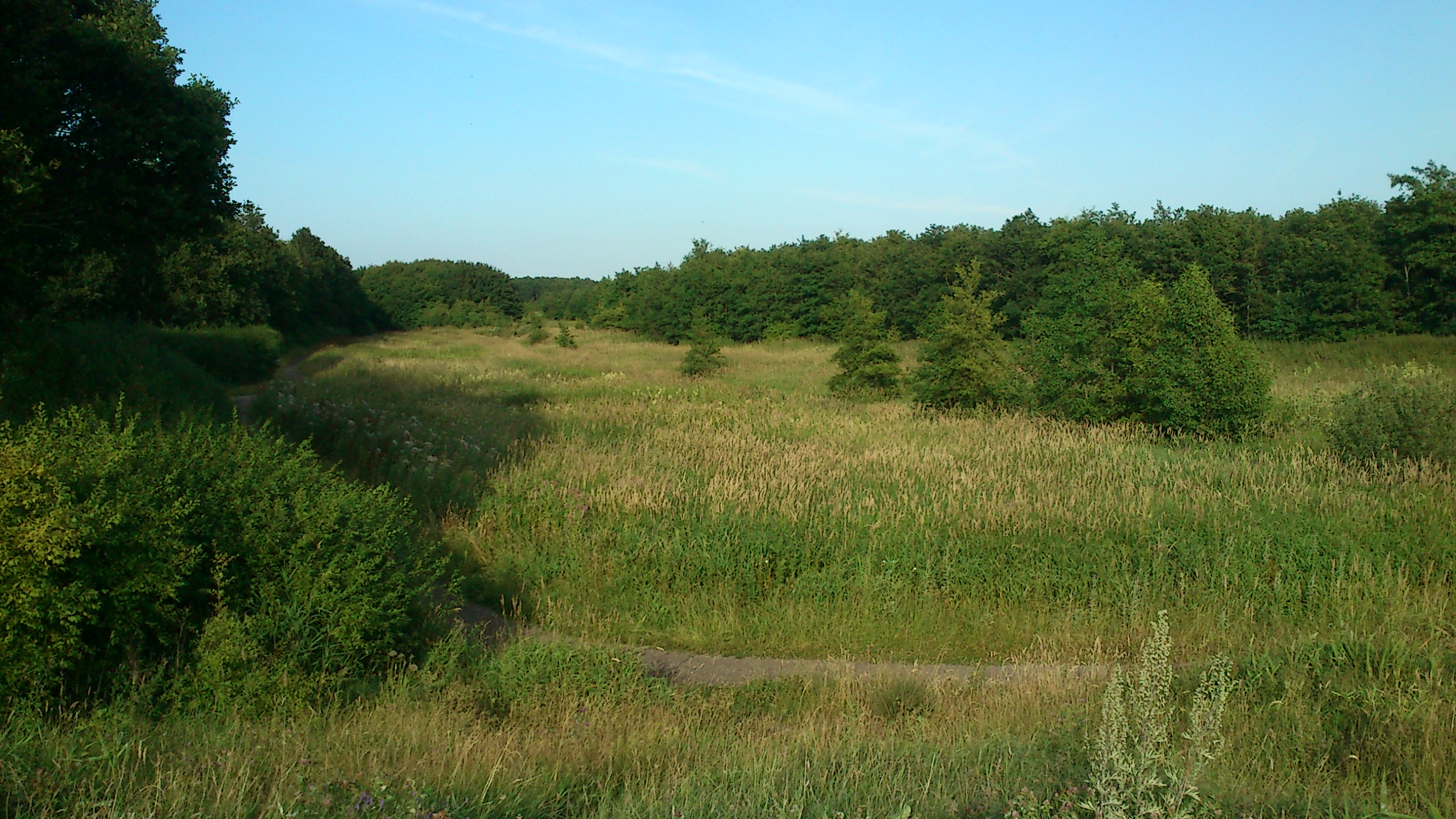
The nature and landscape is highly diverse.

== Sources ==
- Hasle Bakker homepage for the organization (in Danish)
- Skjoldhøjkilen - a recreational area Aarhus Municipality (in Danish)
- Hasle Hills - Learning in nature ULF i Aarhus, Aarhus Municipality (in Danish)
