= New Forests of Aarhus =

New Forests of Aarhus De nye Aarhus Skove
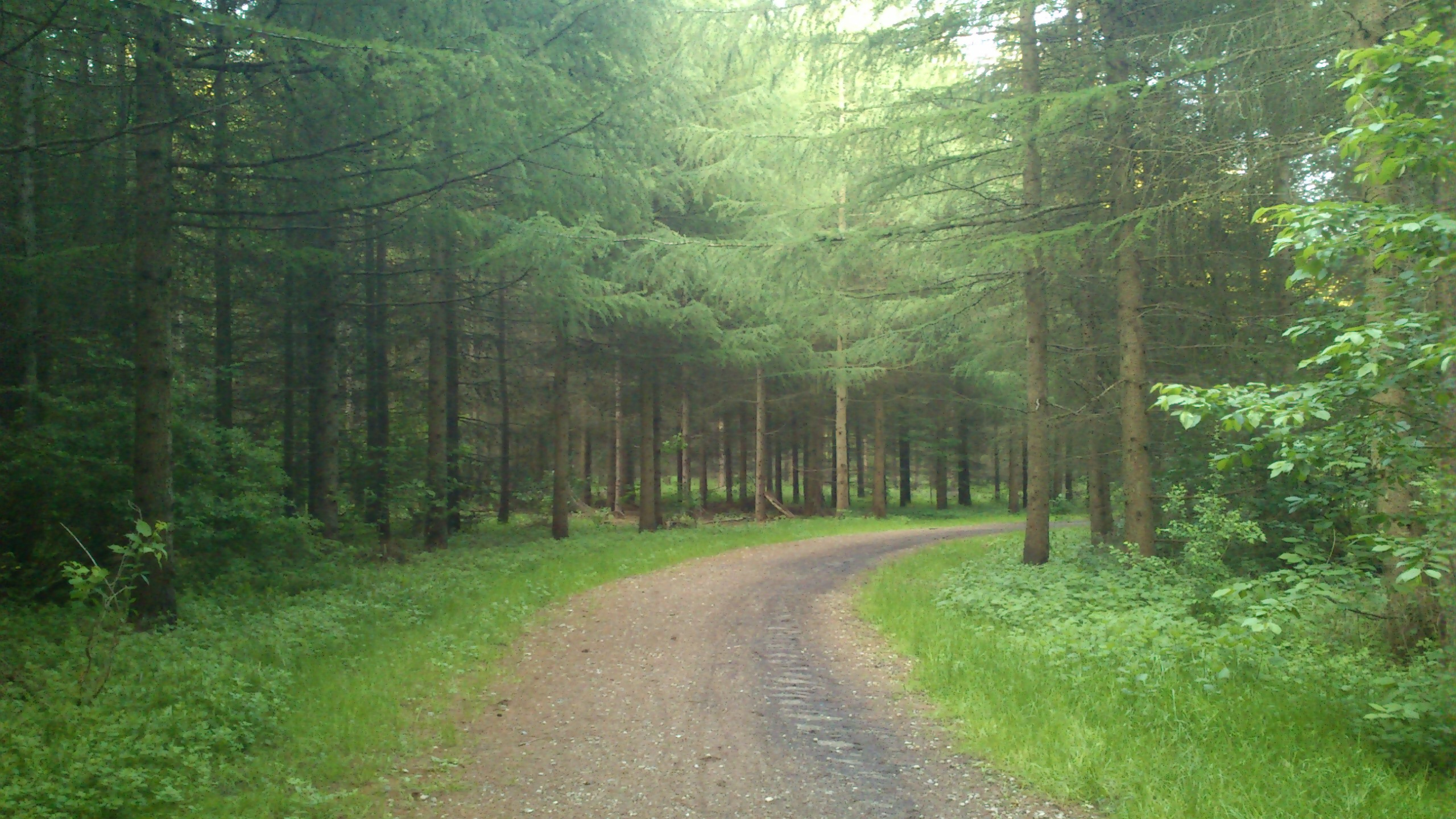
- A path through the forest of Brendstrup Skov (2013). Here larch have been planted as nursing trees. Brendstrup Skov is part of afforestation experiments and research.

Geography
- Location: Denmark, Aarhus

Administration
- Authority: Aarhus Municipality; State of Denmark

New Forests of Aarhus (Danish: De nye Aarhus Skove) is the collective name for a series of woodlands near the city of Aarhus in Denmark. All the forests have recently been planted as part of the plan called Aarhus omkranset af skov (lit: Aarhus surrounded by forest). The plan was initiated by the Aarhus city council in 1988, with the overall aim of doubling the municipality's forested area by the year 2000. As the old forests comprised 1,300 ha, there is controversy whether this goal has been met entirely.

== Woodlands ==
The New Forests of Aarhus comprise these newly raised and public woodlands:

- Skødstrup Skov at 25 ha
- Bærmose Skov at 80 ha
- Lisbjerg Skov at 100 ha
- Mollerup Skov at 97 ha
- Brendstrup Skov at 83 ha
- Gjellerup Skov at 22 ha
- Tranbjerg Skov at 73 ha
- Solbjerg Skov at 30 ha

The total woodland area totals about 510 ha. In cooperation with the Danish Nature Agency, True Skov was raised in 1994 west of Aarhus. True Skov is planned to be a 650 ha woodland, and 385 ha was afforested by 2013. The forest is technically speaking being run by the State of Denmark, but the woodland pools up with the municipal forests in order to reach the goals stated in the 1988 plan.

Aarhus municipality states that their initial goals have been met, but this is clearly not true, as the old forests comprise a minimum of 1,300 ha. With the newly raised True Skov, the total area totaled 895 hectare as of 2013. For unknown reasons, some newly raised forests outside Aarhus municipality before the year 2000 are sometimes included in the area count but seldom mentioned in connection with the 1988 plan and the New Forests of Aarhus. One example is Himmerigskov at 140 ha in the adjacent municipality of Favrskov, planted between 1991 and 1995 in connection with Bærmose Skov by the Danish Nature Agency. Aarhus municipality claims that the State has contributed a total of 700 ha. It is thus unclear whether the original 1988 plan was reached in time. Whatever the truth, there are new afforestation plans going on and they might stitch and patch the 1988 plan in the end.

== Background ==
There were several reasons for initiating the afforestation around Aarhus. The municipality highlights these specific reasons:

- Forests bind CO_{2}: every hectare of new forest binds around 14 tons of CO_{2} per year.
- Forests protect water both above and below ground.
- Forests create new options for outdoor activities.
- Forests make nearby housing districts more attractive.
- Forests improve biological diversity.

The forests—except those run by the State—are all part of the city's nature management program.

== The future ==
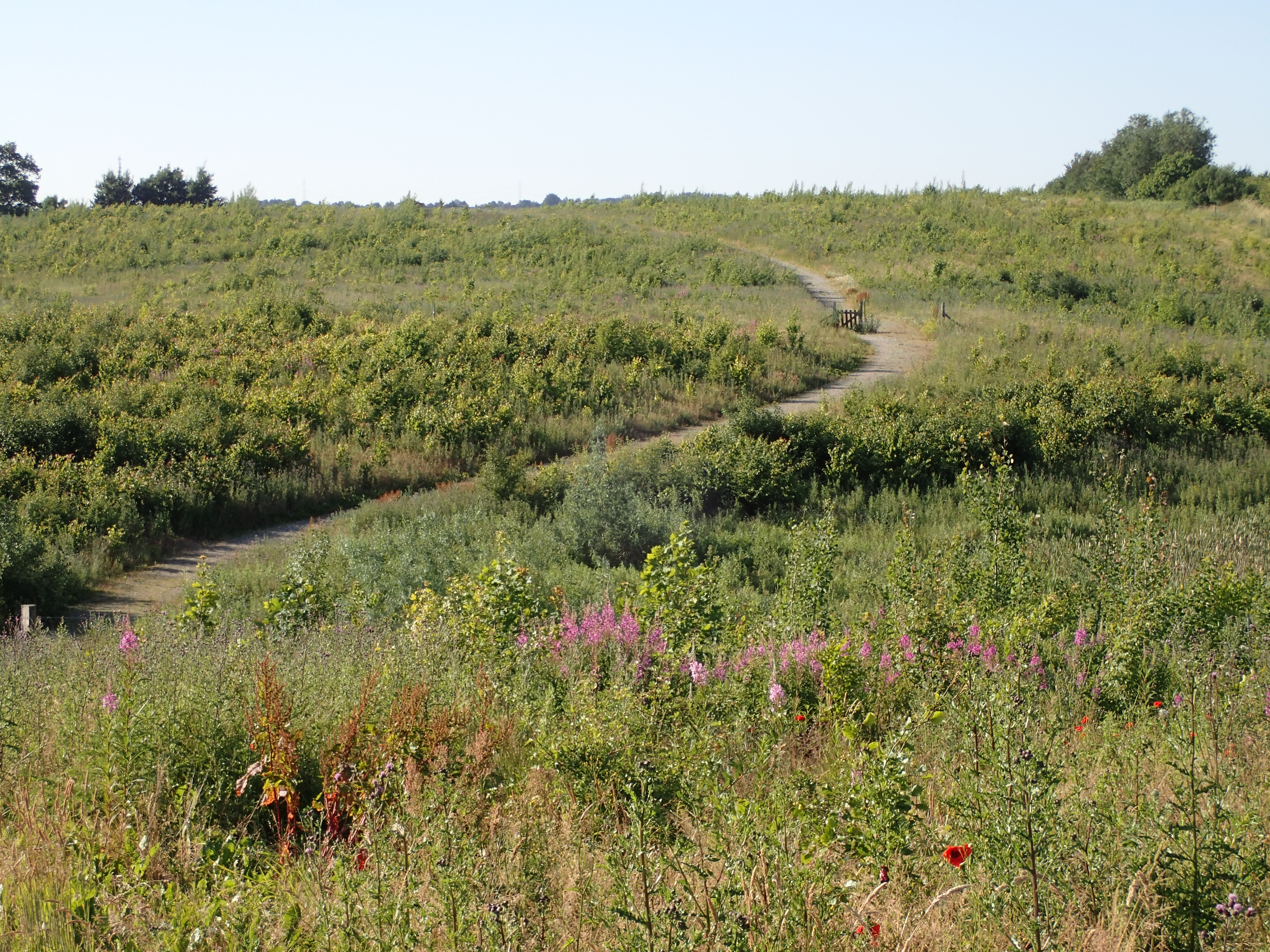
2011 afforestations (Åbo Skov in July 2017)

Aarhus Municipality wants even more woodland than the 1988 plan called for more than thirty years ago. In the year 2009, strategic plans called for doubling the forested area in Aarhus Municipality once again, before the year 2030. This aim is claimed to amount to 3,200 ha of new forest. As of 2012, 320 ha of additional woodland has been planted.

Not all the new forest will be public. In order to reach the ambitious goal, attractive subsidies are being offered to private landowners.

== Gallery ==
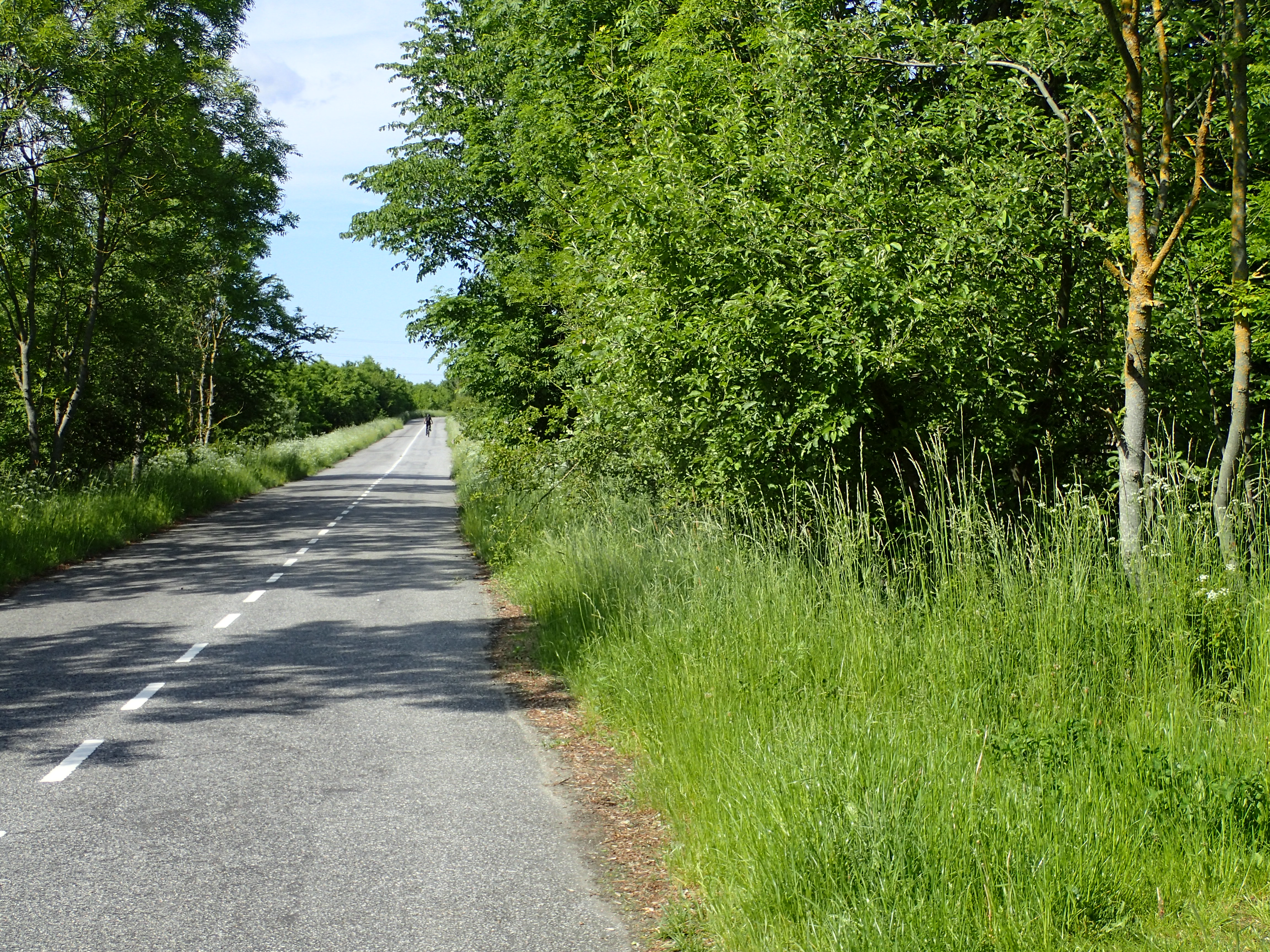
Årslev Skov (2019)

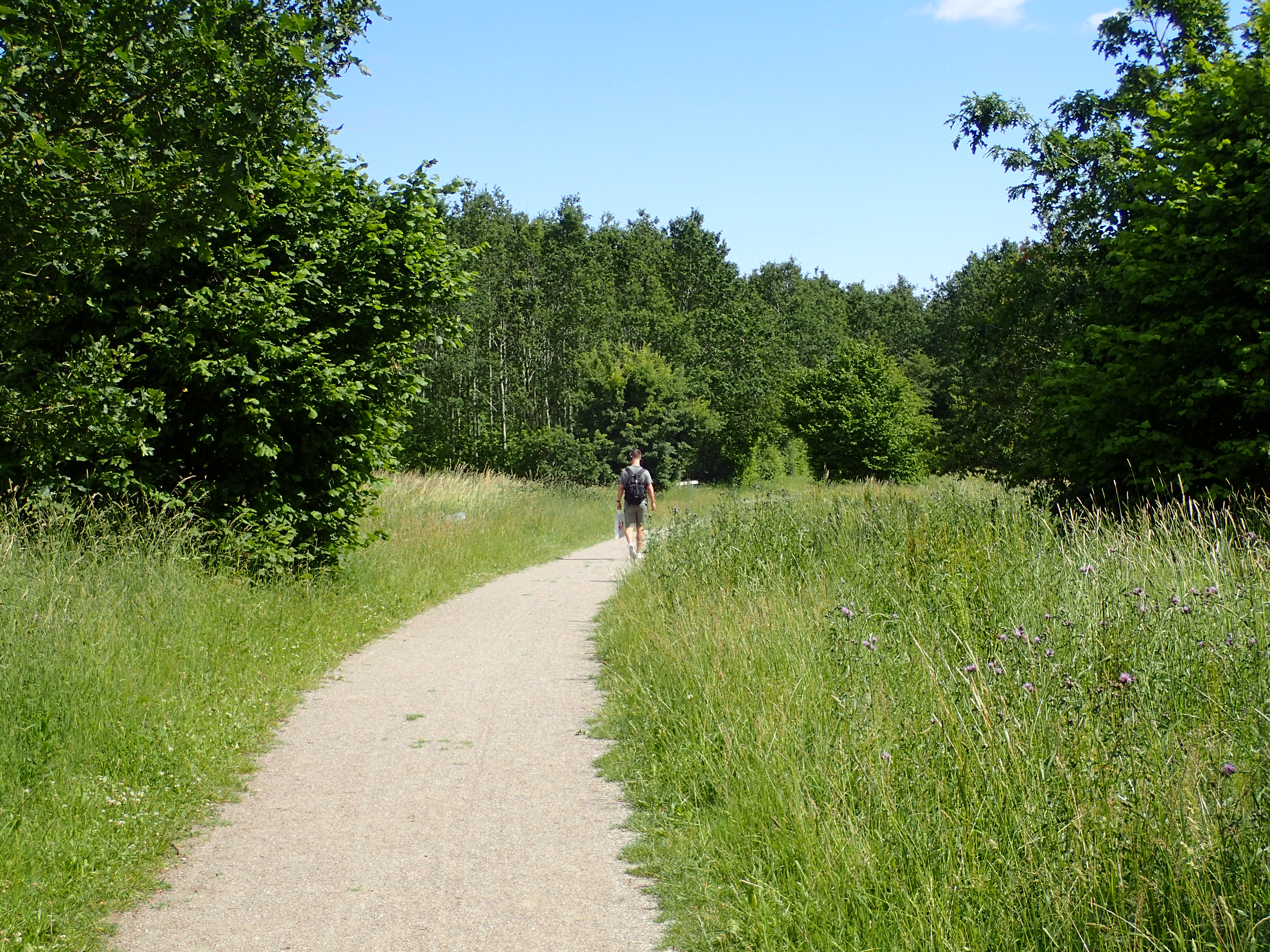
Gellerup Skov (2017)

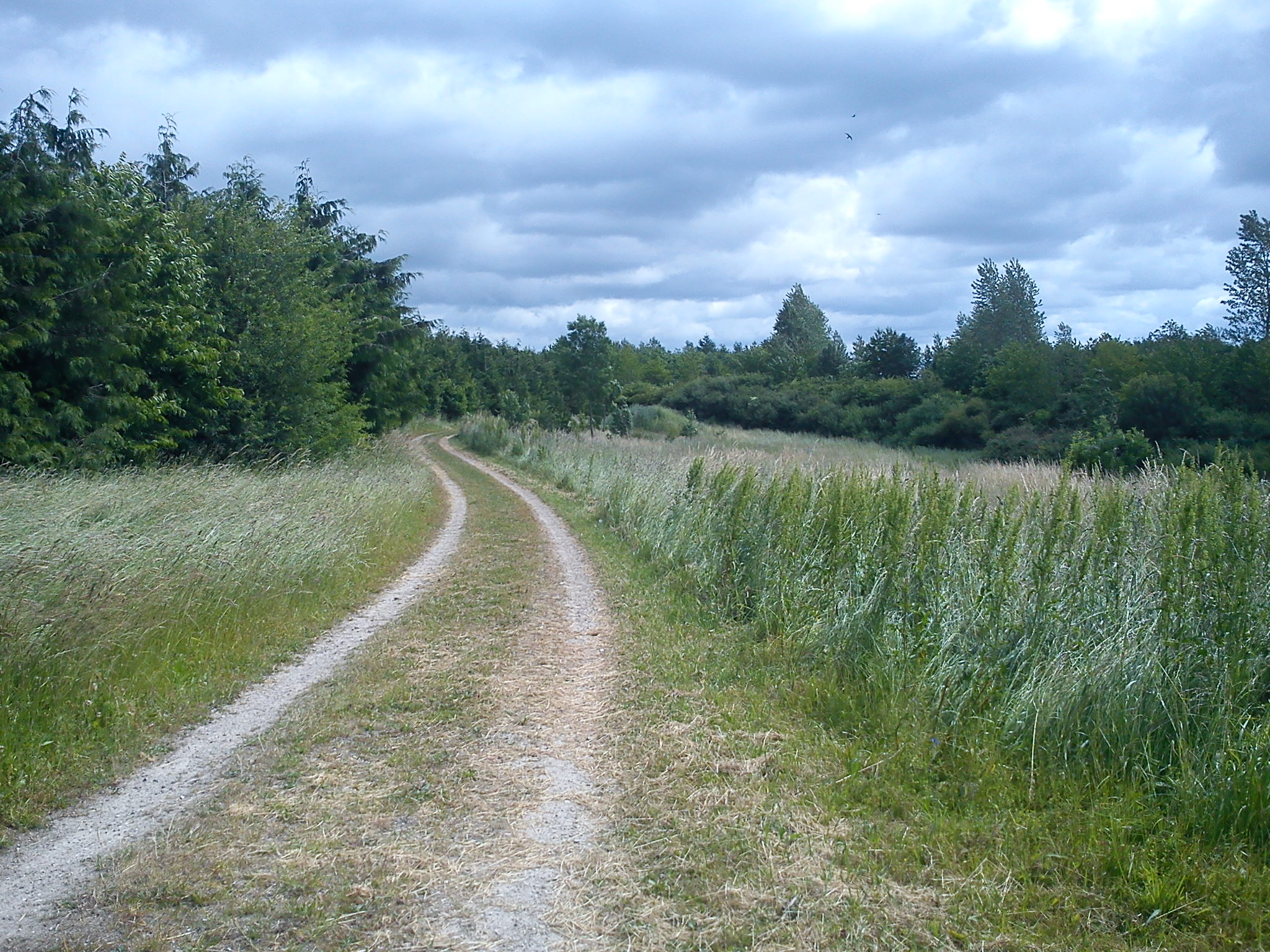
True Skov (2015)

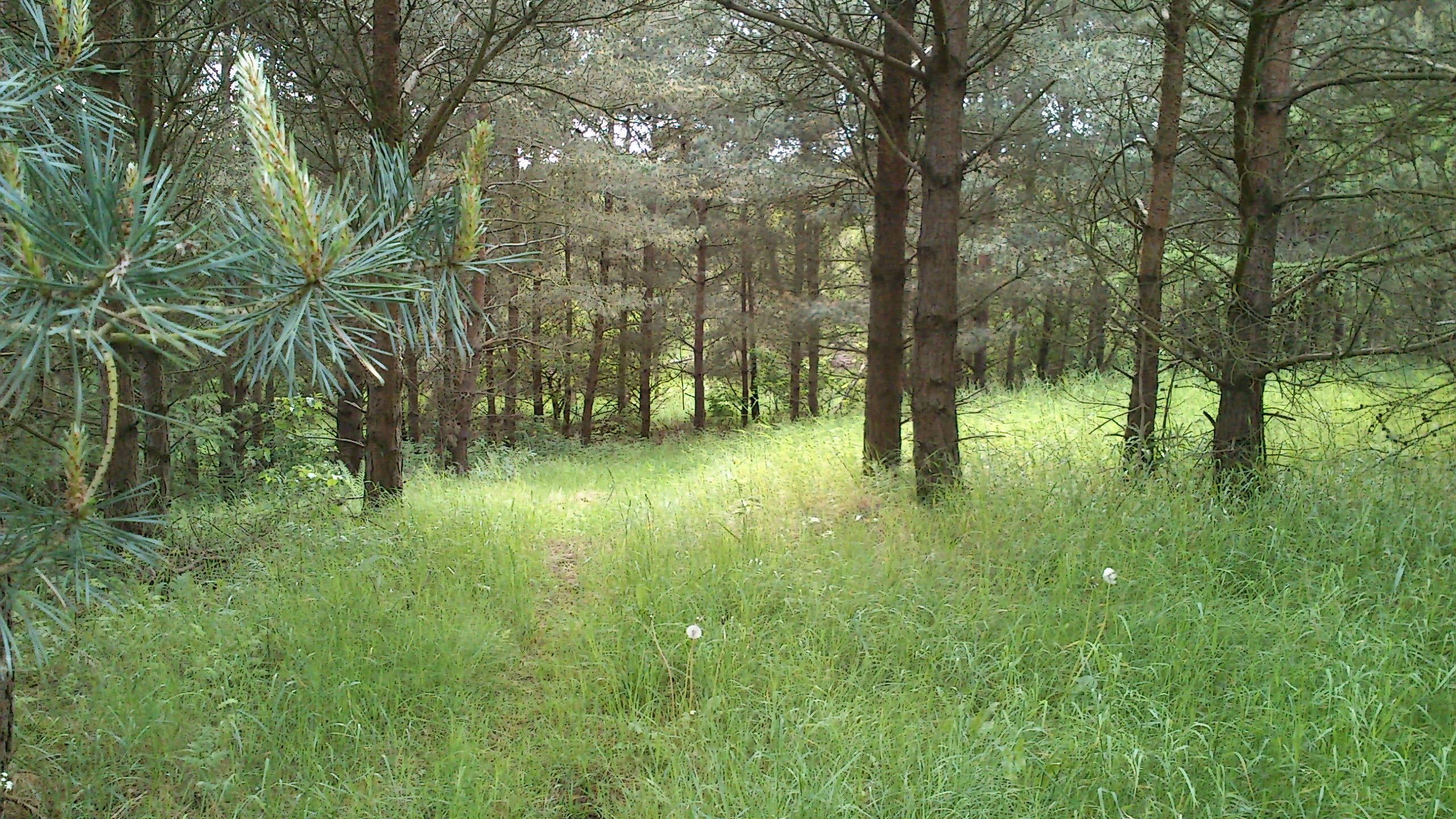
Lisbjerg Skov (2014)

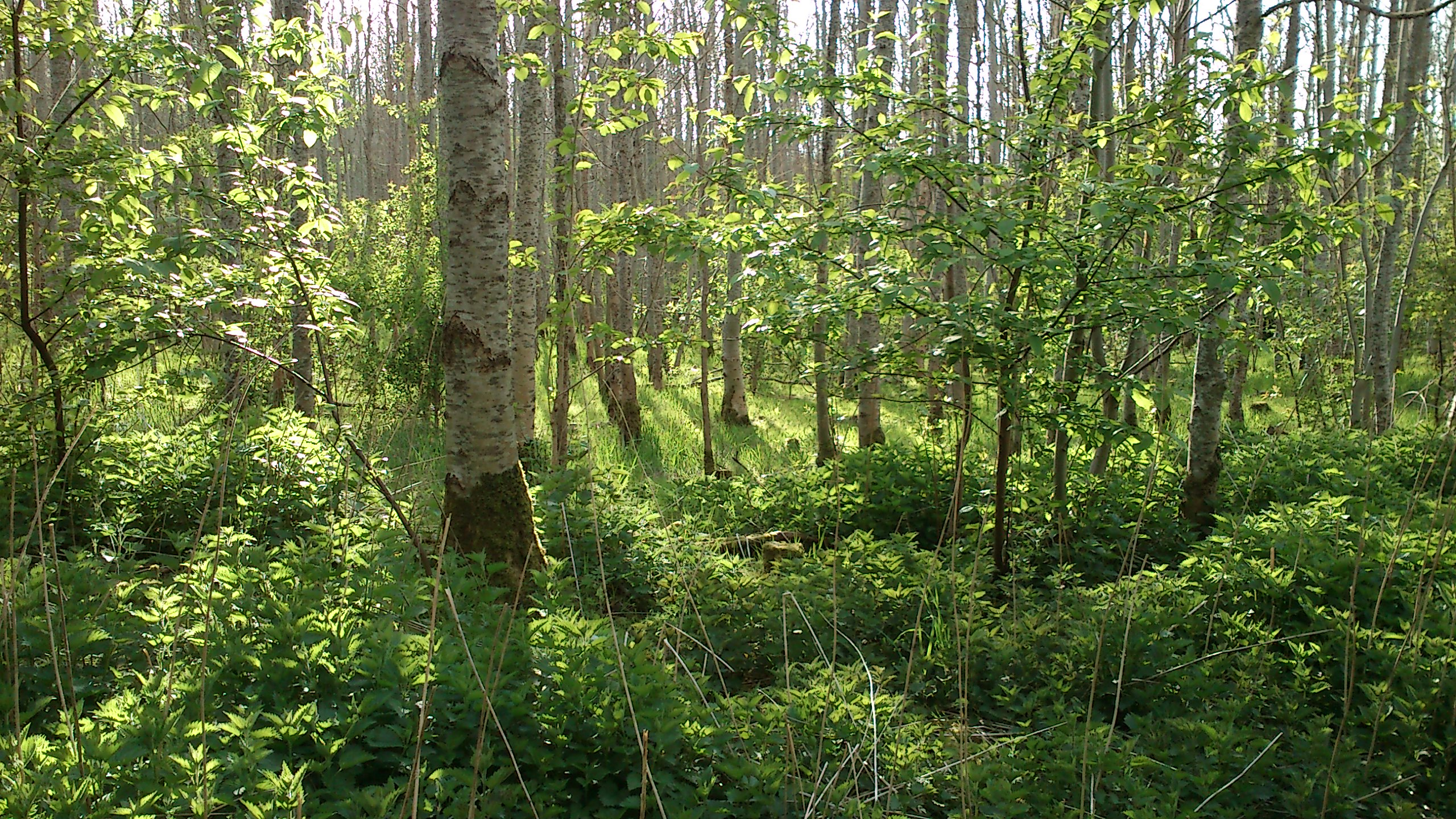
Brendstrup Skov (2014)

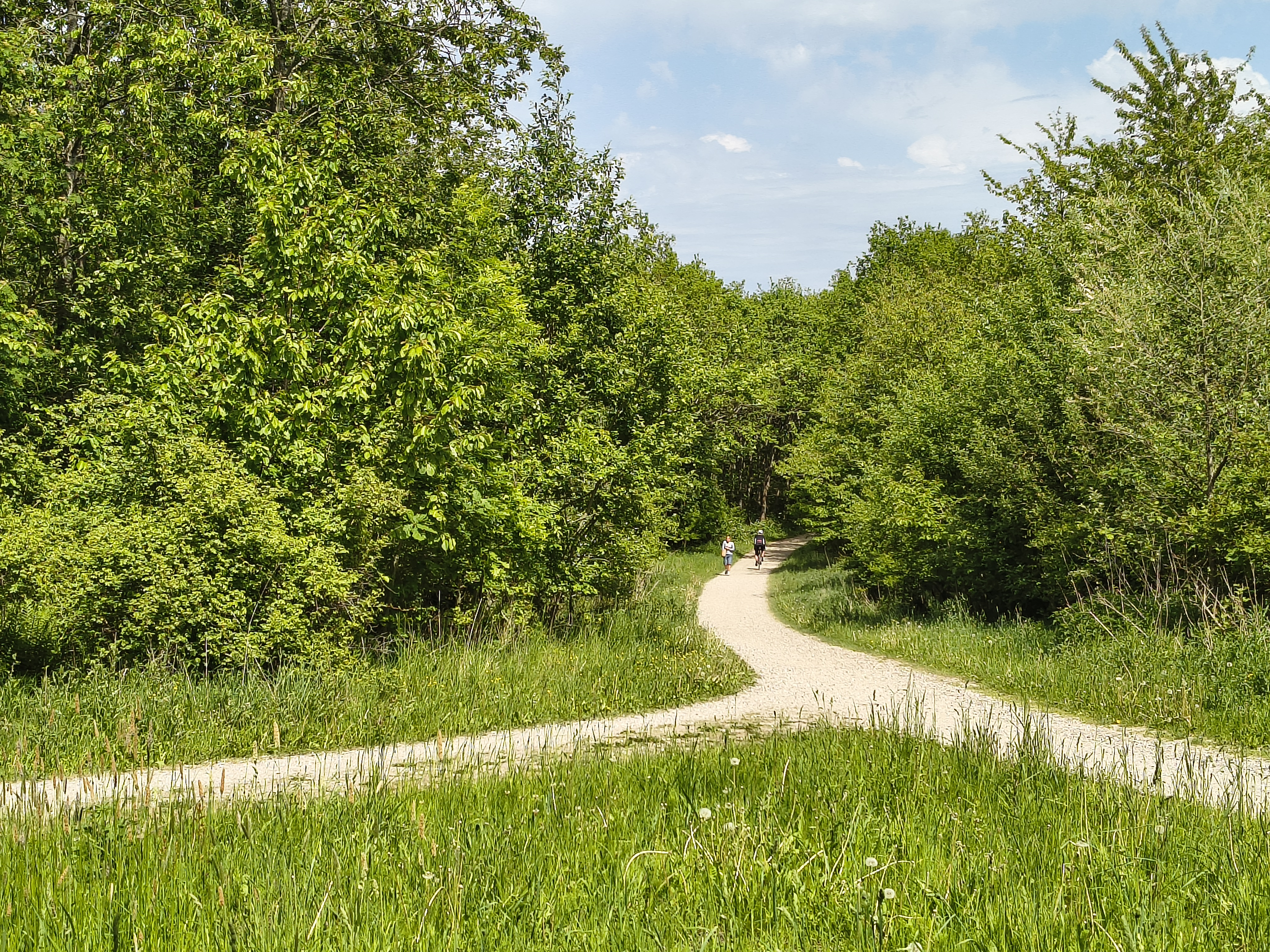
Mollerup Skov (2026)

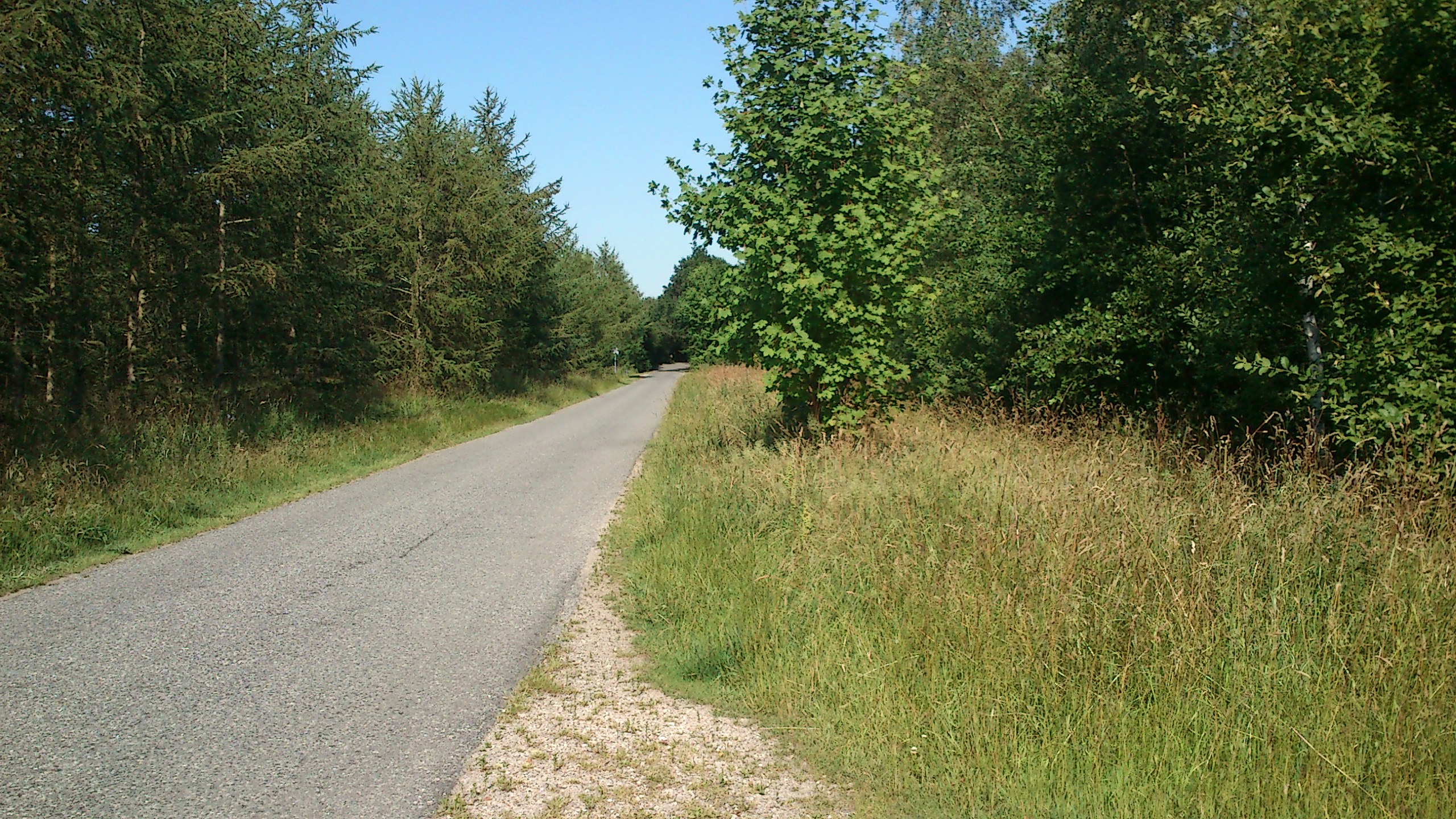
Bærmose Skov (2014)

== Sources ==
- The new forests of Aarhus Aarhus Municipality (in Danish)
