= Mollerup Skov =

Forest in Denmark

Coordinates: 56.206°N 10.200°E

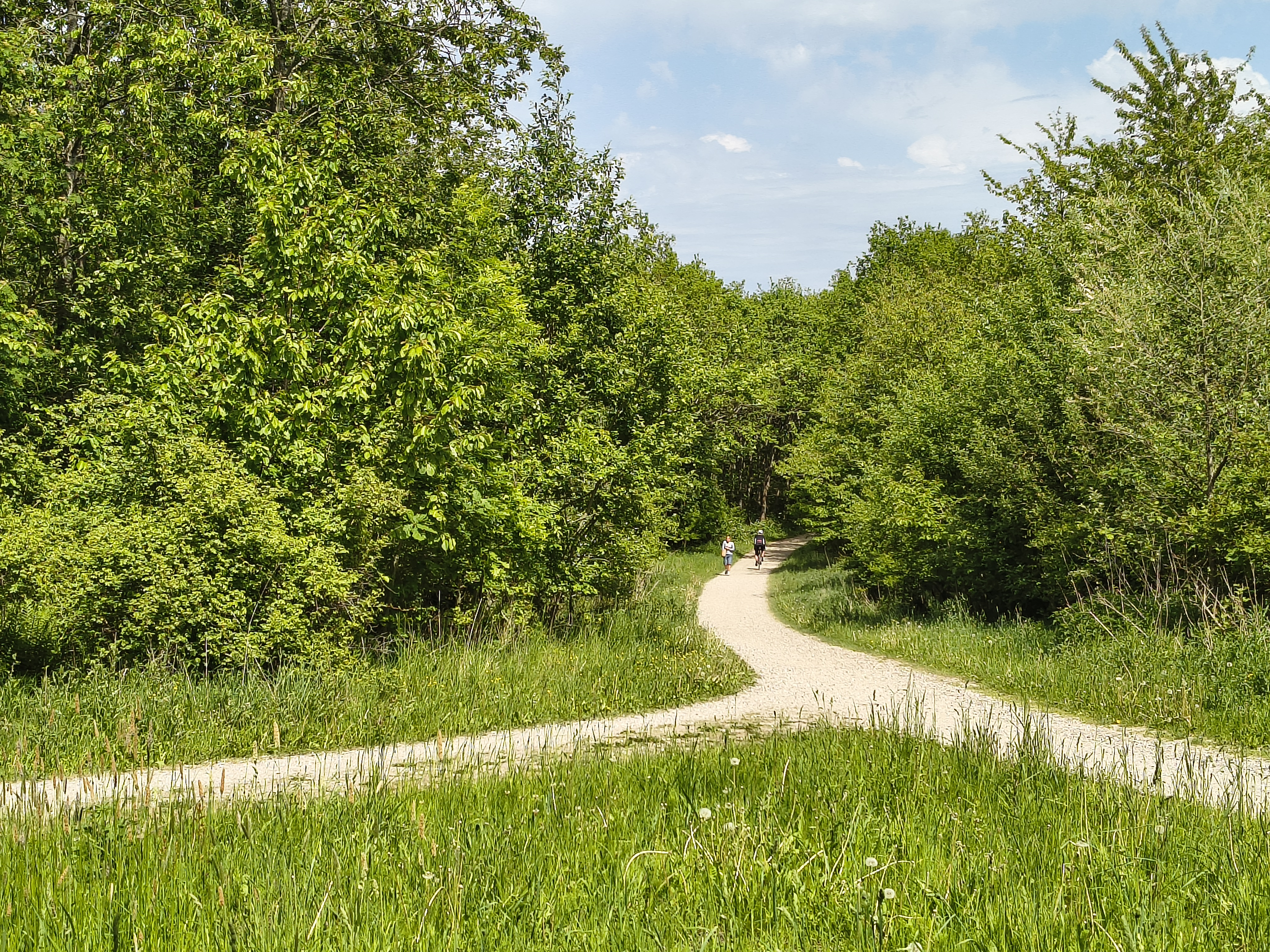
Mollerup Skov in spring

Mollerup Skov (Mollerup Forest) is a 97 hectare relatively new forest situated in the northern outskirts of the city of Aarhus, Denmark. In the neighbourhood of Vejlby and Skejby between Skejbyvej, Langengevej and Skejby Nordlandsvej to be precise.

Mollerup Skov is part of the New Forests of Aarhus.

== Nature and facilities ==
The forest consists predominantly of beech, oak, ash and cherry trees, interrupted by open fields and meadows presenting a view across the valley of Egådalen and the lake of Egå Engsø. The woods are dotted with a number of small ponds, providing a good environment for a rich variety of wildlife. This includes larger mammals such as roe deer, foxes and hares and birds like pheasant, blackbird and siskin, with a few predators like sparrow hawk and buzzard often spotted in between. The animals are not to be fed.

A network of pathways cuts through the plantations of Mollerup Skov. Motor vehicles are not allowed, but the pathways are used for activities like strolling, horseback trotting and jogging. There are two marked routes (red and yellow), approximately 2 km and 3 km respectively. In the south-eastern part there is a fenced dog park, dedicated to exercising dogs. Such areas are known as hundeskove (lit.: dog-forests) in Denmark and they can be found across the country, often situated close to towns and villages.

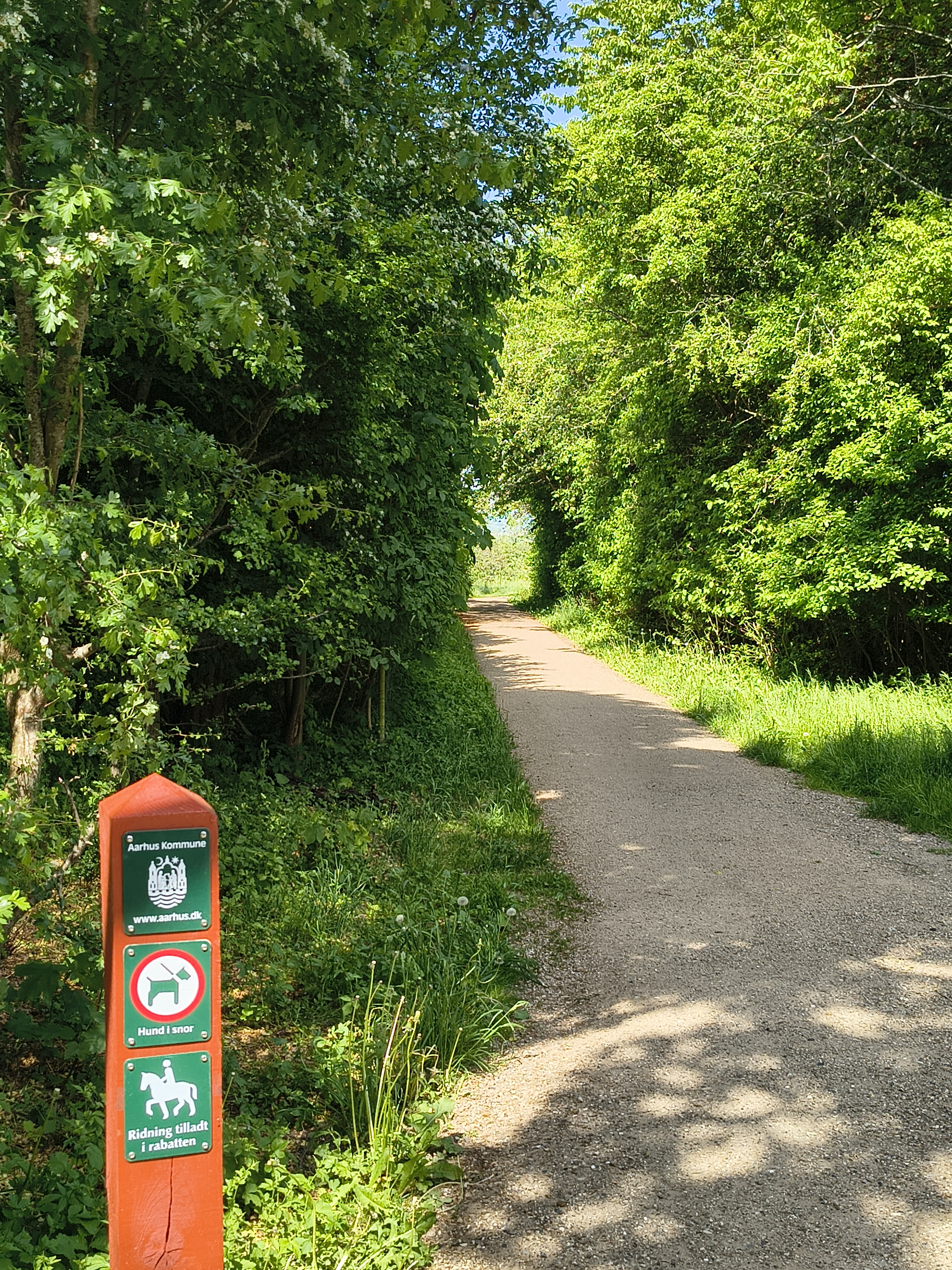
Signpost

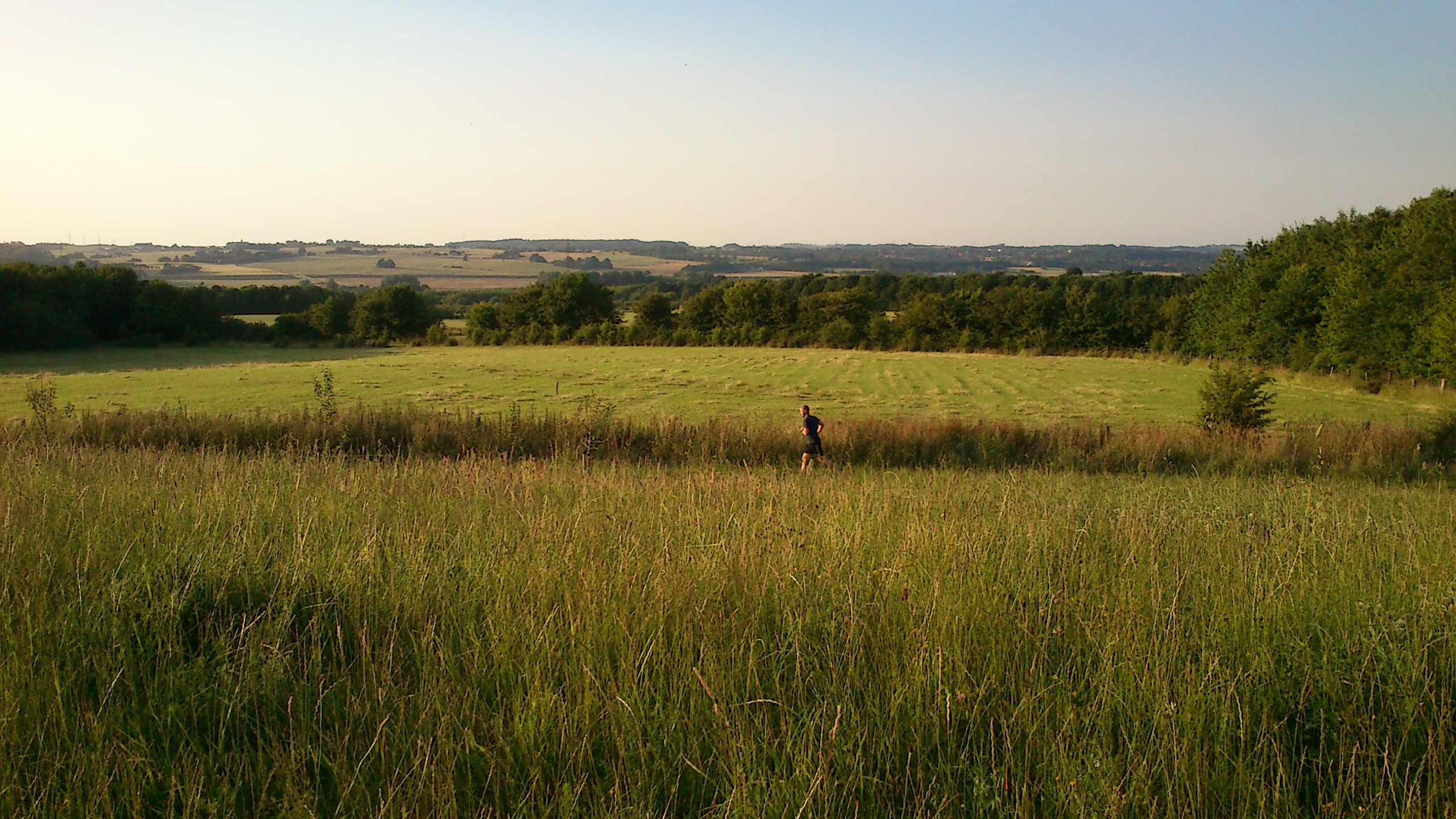
Meadows and pastures cuts through the forest.

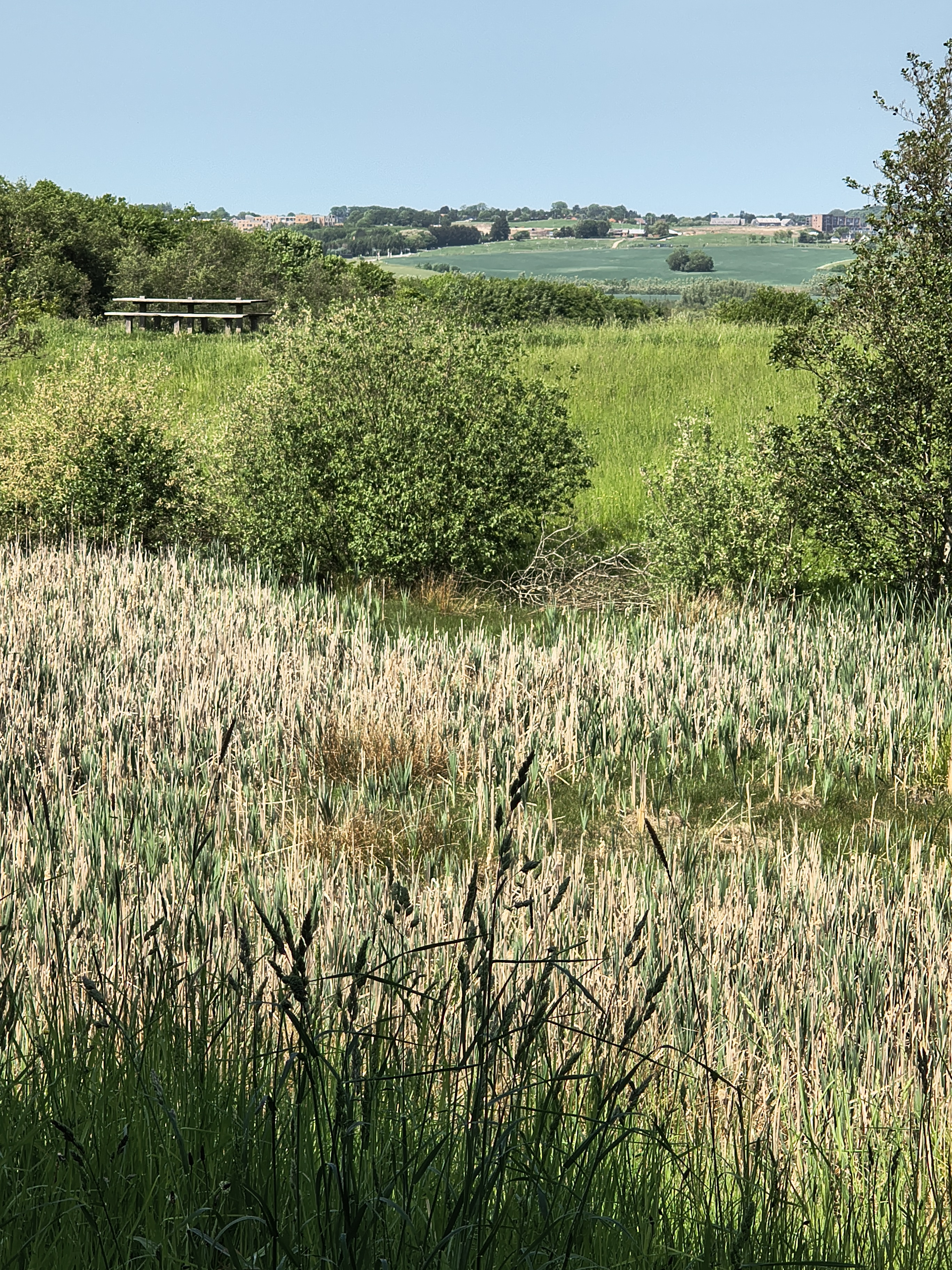
Panoramic view across the broad and flat Egådalen valley in the north

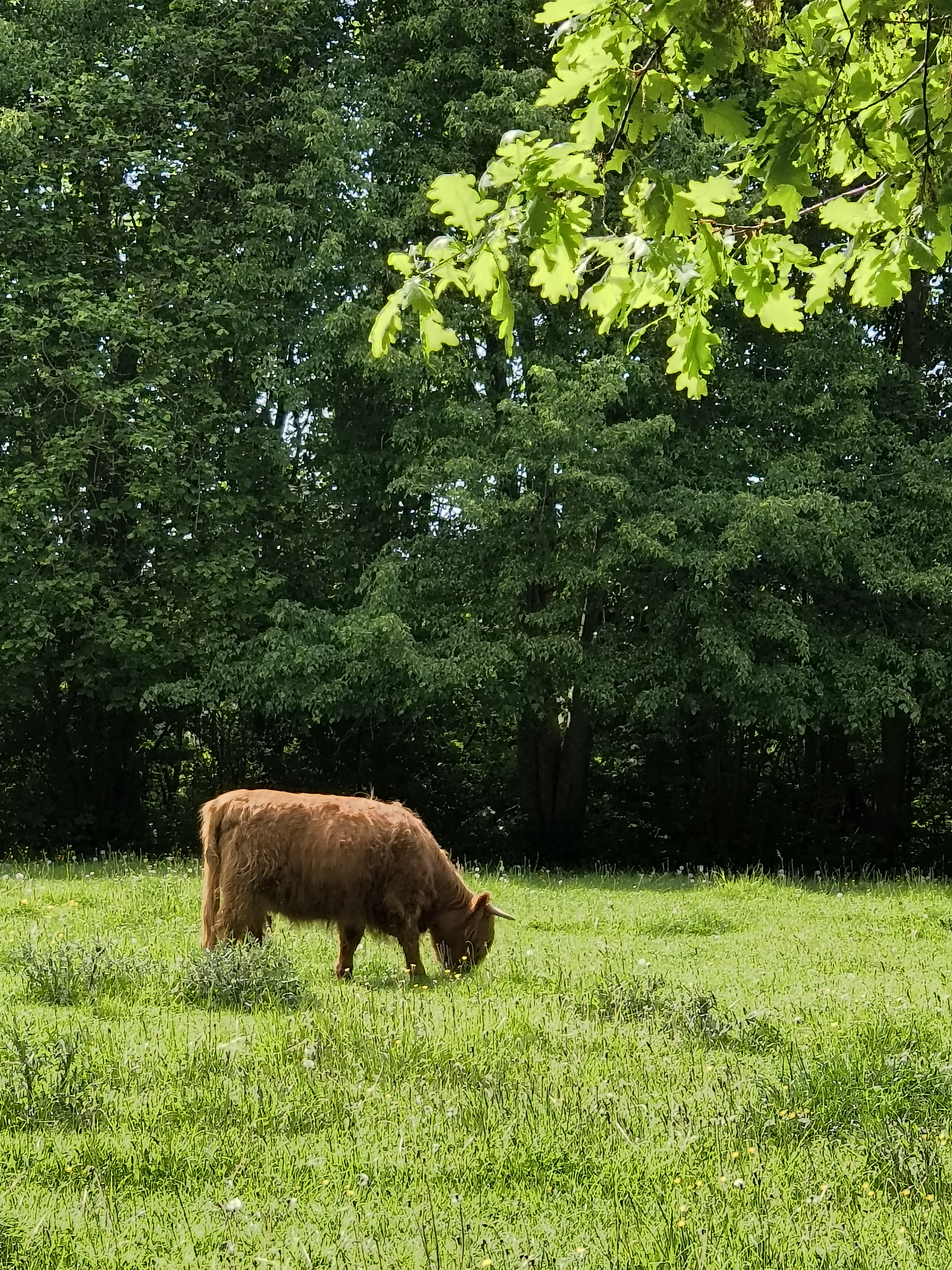
Cattle on a private pasture.

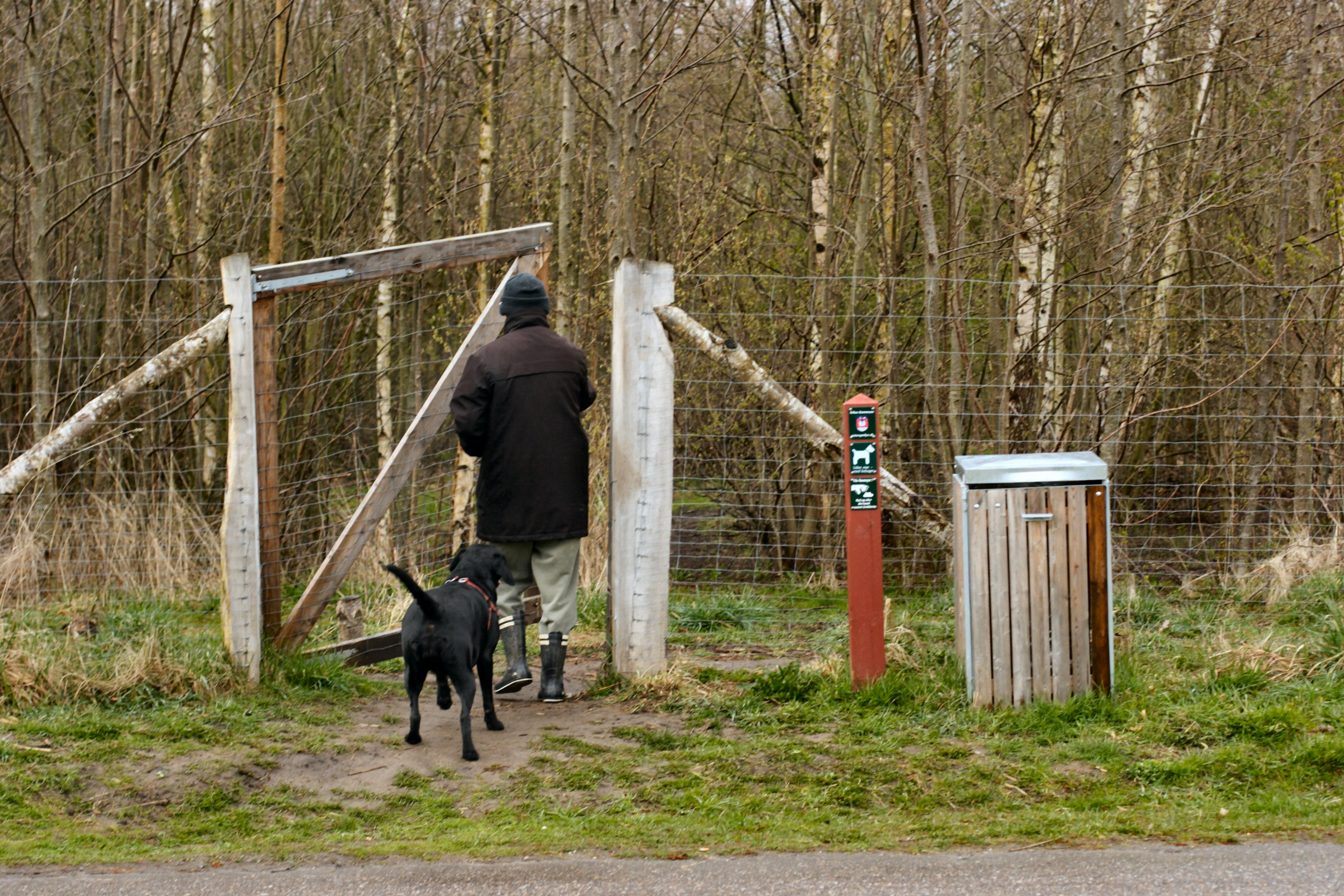
Dog park entry

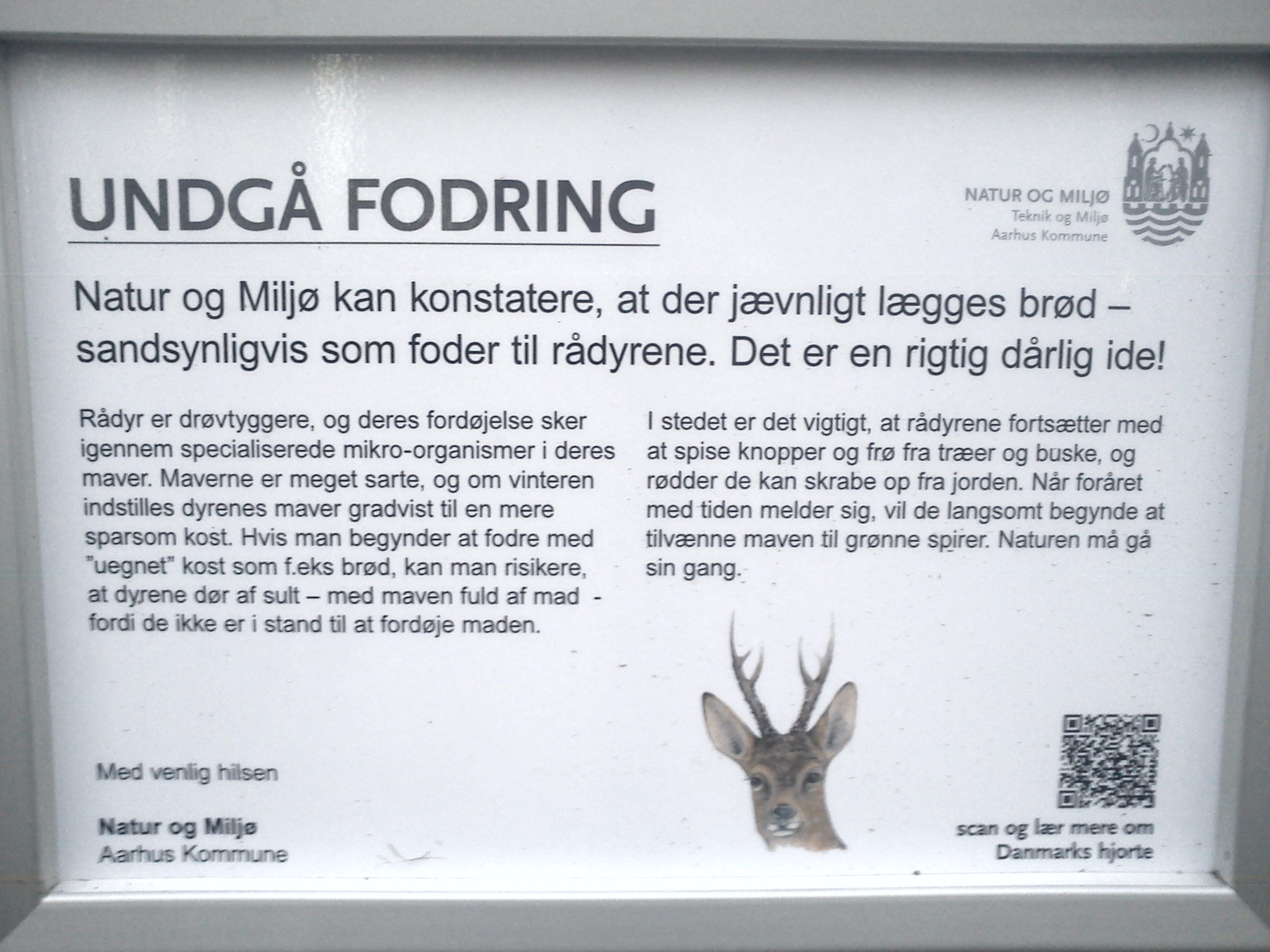
Do not feed the wild animals

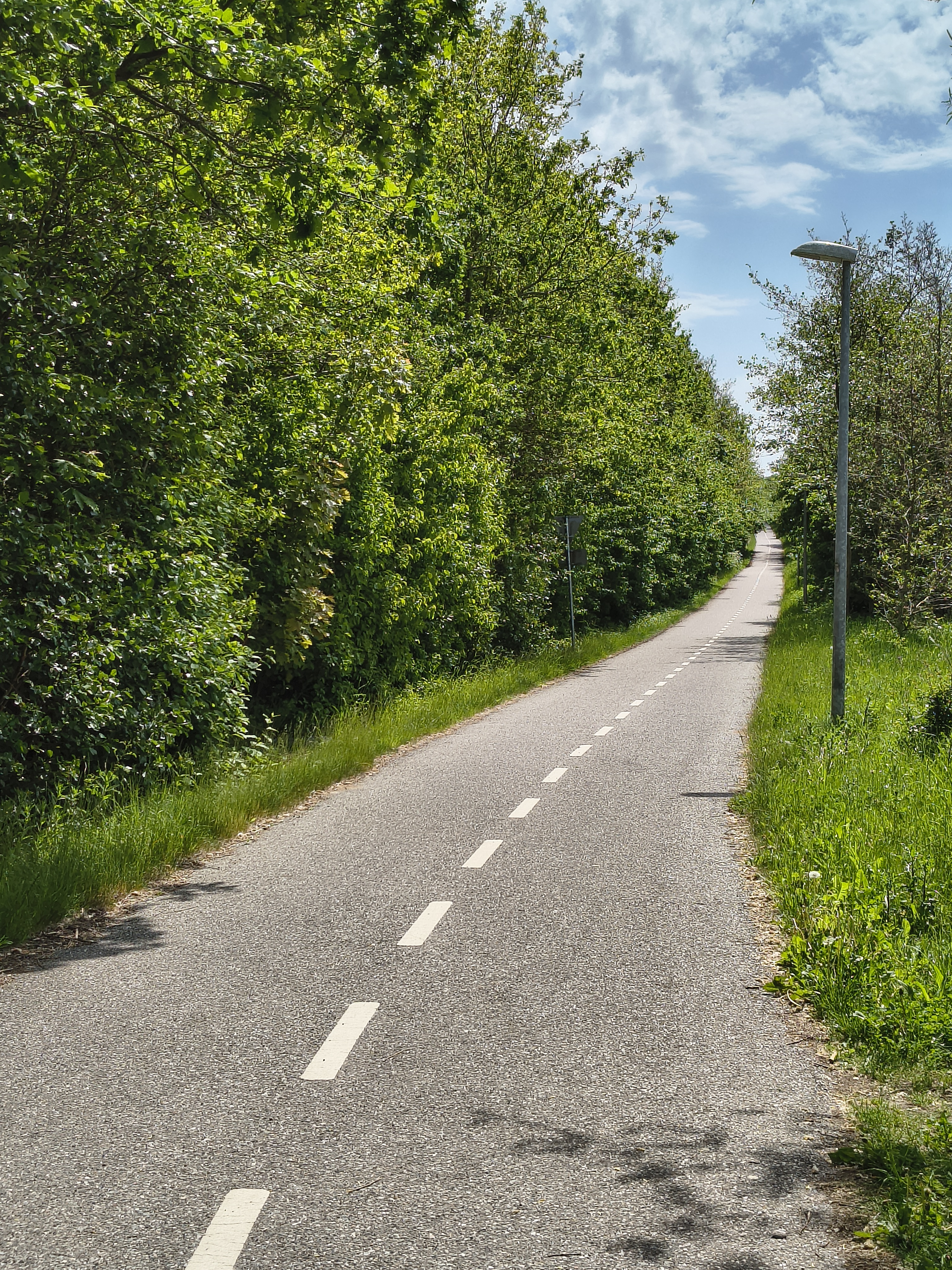
The bikeway Aarhus-Lystrup Ruten pass by on the west side of the forest

== History ==
The land was purchased by Aarhus Kommune in the years of 1993-97, as part of the plan Aarhus omkranset af skov (English: Aarhus surrounded by forest). The plan was begun by the city council in 1988, with the aim of doubling the municipality's forested area by the year 2000 (i.e. 1300 ha). Mollerup Skov is part of the town's nature management program.

== See also ==
Mollerup Skov (Danish)
