= GrimFest =

Music festival in Aarhus

Coordinates: 56.1683°N 10.1247°E

GrimFest is a small music festival, held each summer at a farm in Skjoldhøjkilen, Brabrand; a suburb of Aarhus, Denmark.

GrimFest features a broad range of genres, including rock, pop, electronic, hip hop and punk music. The festival started out as a garden party of four friends at the farm in 2004, and has grown continuously. It is based on volunteers and has a focus on up-coming local talent, with a few big names mixed in, also international stars. The three day festival can host a maximum of 5,000 guests, but some years only 2,000 tickets are offered. Apart from the music, GrimFest also includes attached events such as stand-up and street art culture like graffiti and skateboarding.

The festival was originally named "Danmarks Grimmeste Festival" (Denmark's ugliest Festival), as a joke and wordplay on the farm's name Grimhøj and the popular and more posh music festival "Danmarks Smukkeste Festival" (Denmark's Most Beautiful Festival) in nearby Skanderborg. Despite its tiny size, GrimFest is a notable music festival event in Denmark, hosting several upcoming Danish bands, before they became well-established big names. This includes The Minds of 99, Psyched Up Janis, Bikstok, Tessa, Tobias Rahim, Zar Paulo, and Myrkur.
