= Nurse tree =

Botanical term for a kind of tree

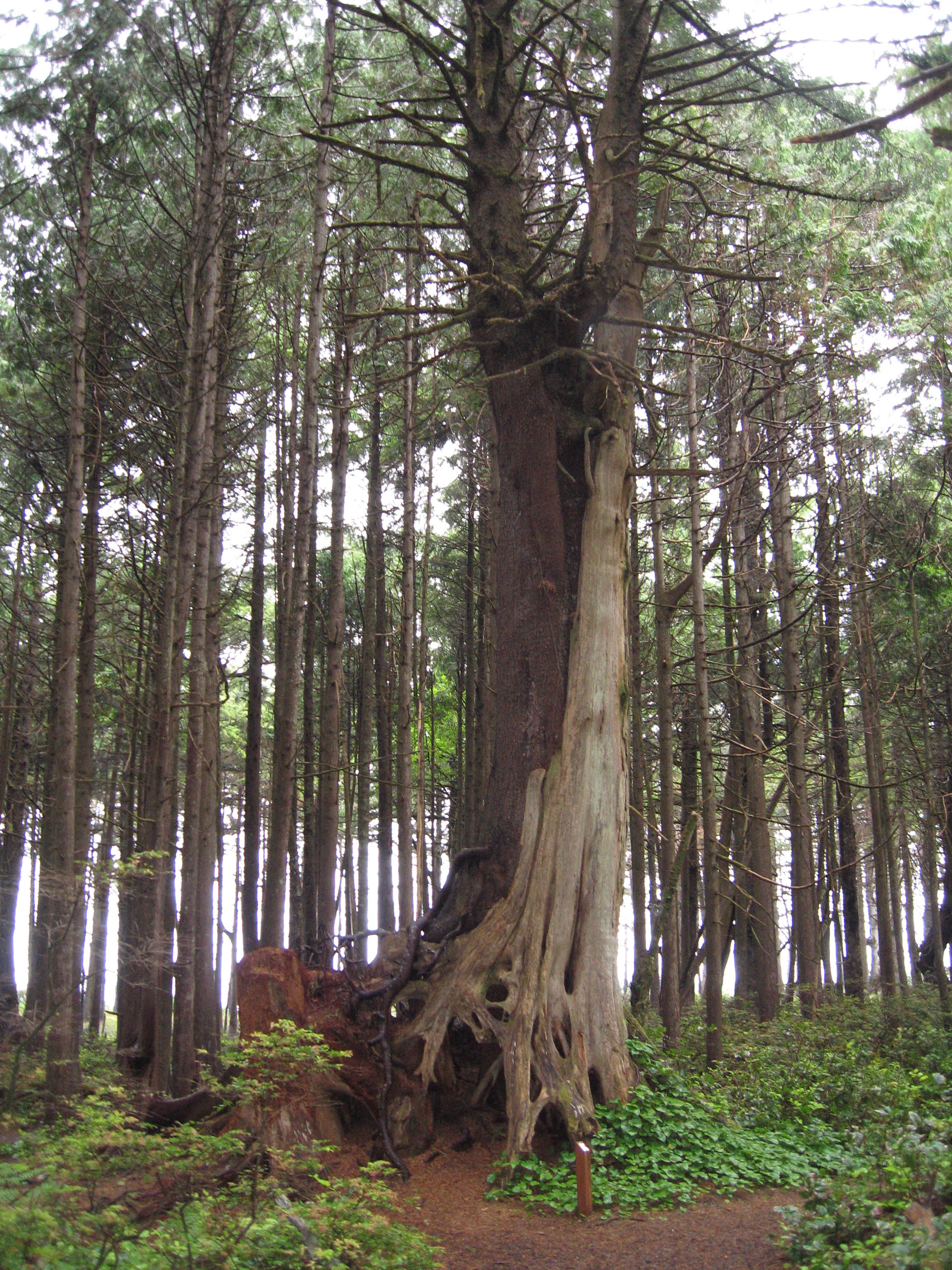
A nurse tree in an Oregon forest

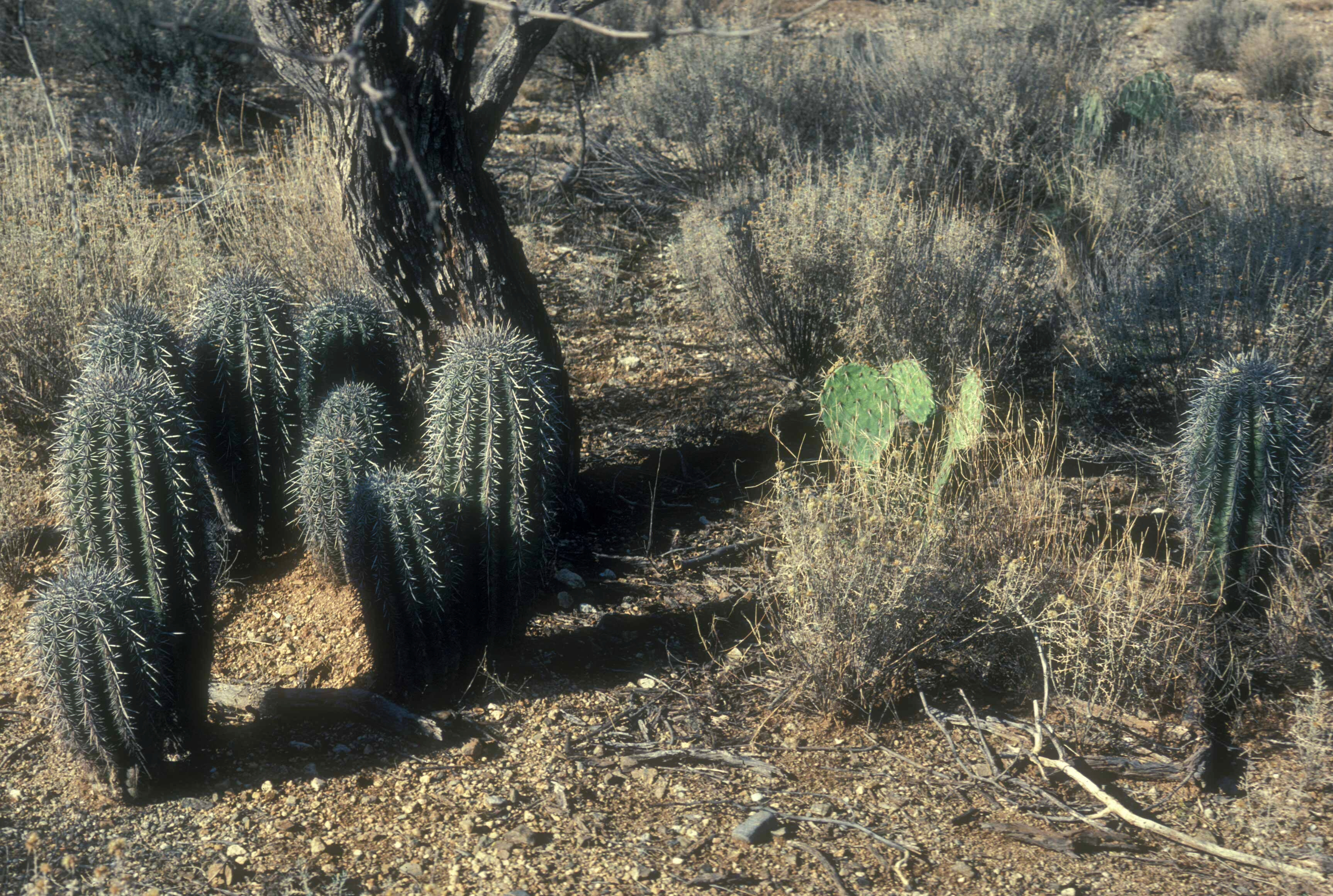
Young saguaros under a nurse tree

A nurse tree is a larger, faster-growing tree that shelters a smaller, slower-growing tree or plant. The nurse tree can provide shade, shelter from wind, protection from animals that would feed on the smaller plant and significant changes in temperature. Fallen leaves from the nurse tree fertilize the ground underneath creating nutrient-rich soil for the saplings and vegetation beneath. Some nurse trees act as nitrogen-fixing agents in the soil. The nurse tree relationship occurs both naturally and via human intervention.

== Examples ==
The Norway spruce (Picea abies) and larch (Larix) can function as nurses for hardwoods.

In the Sonoran Desert, Palo Verde, ironwood and mesquite trees serve as nurse trees for young saguaro cacti. As the saguaro grows and becomes more acclimated to the desert sun, the older tree may die, leaving the saguaro alone. As the saguaro grows larger, it may compete with its nurse tree for resources, hastening its death. Consequently, young saguaros are often seen adjacent to trees, while old saguaros are not.
