= David South =

American musician and filmmaker

David South (also known as "David Del Sur") is an American musician and filmmaker. He is a co-founder of Mono Prism and currently plays bass guitar in SISU, NYC punk band Flowers of Evil, and the solo project of A Place to Bury Strangers bassist Dion Lunadon.

In the past, South has been a member of The Valley Arena, and has performed with Young Boys, Haunted Hearts, and Crocodiles.

His motion work continues to expand, but includes music videos for Gardens & Villa and SISU.

== Mono Prism ==
South founded the Mono Prism label with Sandra Vu in 2012 as a springboard for people involved in music, film, and print projects.

Mono Prism's first production was a music video for the Gardens & Villa song "Spacetime" off of their 2011 release, Gardens & Villa. In 2013, Mono Prism Records released two albums for SISU, Light Eyes EP and Blood Tears LP. Mono Prism went on to produce live visuals for several SISU tours in support of Dirty Beaches, Crocodiles, and Cat Power.

== Discography ==
- "Vile Existence" (1997, with Vile Existence - vocals. bass)
- "Sesso Vita" (2007, with The Valley Arena - bass)
- "Flowers of Evil" (2015, with Flowers of Evil - bass)
- "City of Fear" (2015, with Flowers of Evil - bass)

== Videography ==
- "Maximize" short documentary (2015)
- Flowers of Evil "SS Eyes" music video (2015)
- Flowers of Evil "Throw Fists Not Fits" music video (2015)
- SISU "Two Thousand Hands" music video (2013)
- Gardens & Villa "Space Time" music video (2012)
