= Only in Dreams (Dum Dum Girls album) =

Studio album by Dum Dum Girls
- Released: September 27, 2011
- Recorded: 2011
- Studio: Pink Duck Studios (Glendale, California)
- Genres: Pop rock; indie rock
- Length: 36:30
- Label: Sub Pop
- Producers: Richard Gottehrer; Sune Rose Wagner

Dum Dum Girls chronology
He Gets Me High (2011)	Only in Dreams (2011)	End of Daze (2012)

Singles from Only in Dreams
- 1. "Coming Down" Released: July 19, 2011; 2. "Bedroom Eyes" Released: August 30, 2011

Only in Dreams is the second studio album by the American rock band Dum Dum Girls, released on September 27, 2011 by Sub Pop. It is the band's only album to include all four members.

To promote the album, two singles were released; "Coming Down" was issued for streaming on July 19, 2011, and then a 7" was given away with pre-orders and first pressings of the album, on September 27. The second single "Bedroom Eyes" was issued for streaming on August 30, 2011, followed by a promo single distributed on September 26.

== Development and release ==
Band founder and lead vocalist Kristin "Dee Dee" Gundred solely wrote the album throughout 2010. The album was recorded at Queens of the Stone Age frontman Josh Homme's Pink Duck Studios in Glendale, California, and co-produced by Richard Gottehrer, who returned after producing the band's debut album, I Will Be, the year prior, along with member of The Raveonettes and songwriter Sune Rose Wagner in his producing debut.

Only in Dreams was announced on June 30, 2011, along with the albums track list and tour dates. The album's first single "Coming Down" was released on July 19, with the second single "Bedroom Eyes" following on August 30, 2011.

== Content ==
In a August 2011 interview with Rolling Stone, Gundred described the album's primary theme as a "sense of longing" and later "coming to terms with death for the first time," citing the frequent physical separations of she and her then-husband Brandon Welchez (lead vocalist of the Crocodiles), when one or the other was touring, and her mother who died in October 2010. "Hold Your Hand" was written directly after Gundred's mother was diagnosed with brain cancer.

The album's tracks "Wasted Away," "Coming Down," and "Hold Your Hand," stems drumbeats from The Ronettes' 1963 song "Be My Baby", inspired drones from the 1967 album The Velvet Underground & Nico, to vocals channeling the likes of Chrissie Hynde.

== Commercial performance ==
Only in Dreams peaked at #38 on the UK Independent Albums Chart in its second week. On October 15, 2011, it peaked at #1 on the Heatseekers charts and #105 on the Billboard 200. It later re-entered the Heatseekers chart in January 2012 at #39.

== Critical reception ==
Professional ratings
Review scores
Source	Rating
AllMusic	3.5/5 stars
Consequence of Sound	2/5 stars
The Guardian	4/5 stars
musicOMH	4/5 stars
New York Times	Positive
NME	7/10 stars
Pitchfork	7.6/10
PopMatters	5/10 stars
Rolling Stone	3.5/5 stars
Spin	8/10 stars

The album received generally positive reviews upon its release. At Metacritic, which assigns a normalized rating out of 100 to reviews from mainstream critics, the album received an average score of 74 based on 26 reviews, which indicates "Generally favorable reviews".

Spin awarded the album a rating of 8 out of 10, writing, "Gundred's richer-than-you-expect voice is the key to these jagged little pillows, whether dryly noting that a guy's 'Just a Creep,' soaring on 'Coming Down,' or lacing her echoes with sorrow on 'Hold Your Hand,' a reflection on her mother's death." In Lindsay Zoladz's 7.6-out-of-10 review, Pitchfork lauded the album's melodic risks within the genre of garage rock revival, "Only in Dreams isn't a perfect record, but a little while down the line it might end up looking like the beginning of something-- the first steps forward for the band, or perhaps a raising of the bar for this entire revival. I wouldn't put it past Dee Dee to be the leader of the pack." The New York Times echoed this viewpoint in Jon Caramanica's positive review, which stated, "Only in Dreams ... seethes with a beautiful, raging confidence, louder and fuller than anything they’ve done before, and better than the onetime peers they’re leaving behind." MusicOMH's Gareth Ware's 4-out-of-5 review also agreed that "[Only in Dreams] showcases a remarkably assured collection of songs."

AllMusic was more critical of the Dum Dum Girls' new direction: "All this realness could be a deal breaker especially since Only in Dreams isn't a fun and immediately enjoyable album like I Will Be was." PopMatters wasn't impressed with the overall sound of the album, saying, "Everything is layered and burnished into an eardrum-blasting sameness. There are no standouts or outright bombs, just 10 Dum Dum Girls songs; no more, no less.". Joe Marvilli from Consequence of Sound, in a negative review, felt that Only in Dreams needed more variety, stating, "You can only take so many variations of the same theme."

=== Year-end lists ===
Critic/Publication	List	Rank	Ref
Spin	50 Best Albums of 2011	17	
ABC News	The 50 Best Albums Of 2011	8	
Jon Caramanica of The New York Times	Top 10 Albums of 2011	4	
Chris Riemenschneider of The Minnesota Star Tribune	Top 10 Albums of 2011	9	
James Reed of The Boston Globe	Top Albums of 2011	10	
Les Inrockuptibles	100 Best Albums of 2011	36	
Under the Radar	Top 80 Albums of 2011	40	
Matthew Berlyant of The Big Takeover	Top 10 Albums of 2011	1	
Mike Usinger of The Georgia Straight	Top 10 Albums of 2011	2	
The Village Voice	Pazz & Jop Albums 2011	55	

=== Decade-end lists ===
Publication	List	Rank	Ref
Erie Reader	Best Albums of the Decade	31	

== Track listing ==
All tracks are written by Dee Dee.

No.	Title	Length
1.	"Always Looking"	2:21
2.	"Bedroom Eyes"	3:58
3.	"Just a Creep"	2:56
4.	"In My Head"	3:48
5.	"Heartbeat (Take It Away)"	2:51
6.	"Caught in One"	3:44
7.	"Coming Down"	6:28
8.	"Wasted Away"	3:39
9.	"Teardrops on My Pillow"	2:49
10.	"Hold Your Hand"	3:56
Total length:		36:30

iTunes bonus track
No.	Title	Length
11.	"Crystal Baby"	2:22
Total length:		38:52

Sub Pop bonus 7" vinyl
No.	Title	Length
1.	"Coming Down" (Edit)	3:56
2.	"Crystal Baby"	2:22
Total length:		6:18

== Personnel ==
- Dee Dee Penny – vocals, guitar
- Jules – guitar, vocals
- Bambi – bass, vocals
- Sandy Vu – drums, vocals

Engineered by Alonzo Vargas, with assistance from Justin Smith. Mixed by Alonzo Vargas. Mastered by Joe LaPorta.

== Charts ==
Chart (2011)	Peak position
UK Independent Albums (Official Charts)	38
US Billboard 200	105
US Heatseekers Albums (Billboard)	1

Chart (2012)	Position
US Heatseekers Albums (Billboard)	39

== Release history ==
Country	Date	Format	Label
United Kingdom	September 26, 2011	CD, digital download, LP record	Sub Pop
Canada	September 27, 2011	CD, digital download, LP record	Sub Pop
United States	September 27, 2011	CD, digital download, LP record	Sub Pop

The first 1,900 copies of the LP version of the album were released on light pink vinyl as a "Loser Edition".
