= Dum Dum Girls (2008 EP) =

EP by Dum Dum Girls
- Released: 2008
- Recorded: 2008
- Genre: Indie rock, shoegaze, noise pop, post-punk revival
- Length: 15:18
- Label: Zoo Music, Sub Pop
- Producer: Dee Dee

Dum Dum Girls chronology
Dum Dum Girls (2008)	Dum Dum Girls (2009)

Singles from Dum Dum Girls
- 1. "Longhair" Released: 2008

Dum Dum Girls is the debut EP by Dum Dum Girls, released in 2008 by frontwoman Dee Dee's own label, Zoo Music. The release was initially limited to 100 pressings, but was later repressed in CD-R format by Sub Pop and offered to those who preordered their debut album, I Will Be.

== Track listing ==
All songs written and composed by Dee Dee, except as noted.

No.	Title	Length
1.	"Ship of Love"	1:42
2.	"Longhair"	3:03
3.	"Dream Away Life" (appears as D.A.L.)	4:26
4.	"Catholicked" (chorus lyrics by Patti Smith)	2:39
5.	"Hey Sis"	3:26
Total length:		15:18
