= Dum Dum Girls =

American rock band

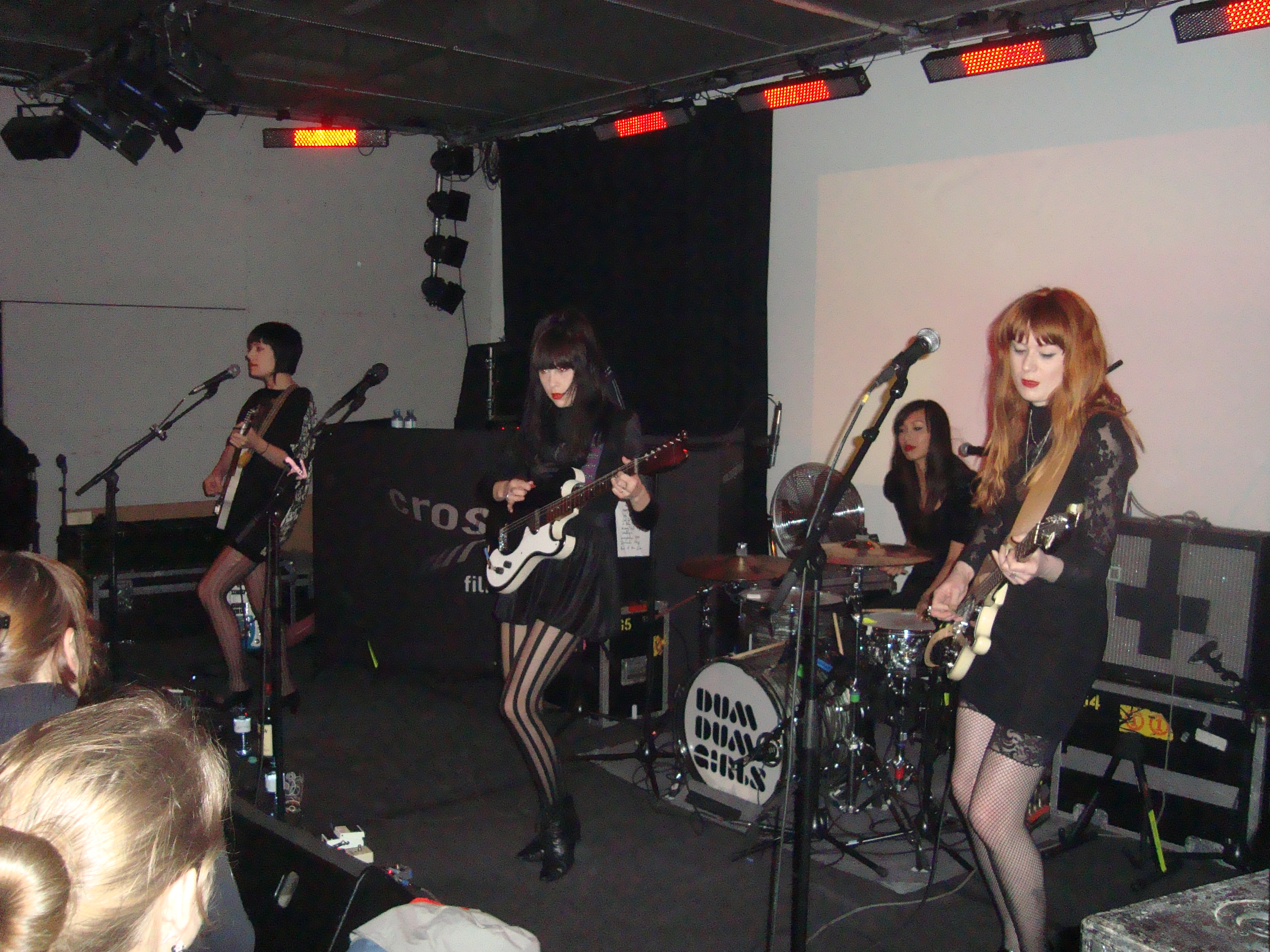
- Dum Dum Girls in 2011

Background information
- Origin: Los Angeles, California
- Genres: Indie rock, noise pop, dream pop, shoegaze, alternative rock, garage rock
- Years active: 2008–2015
- Labels: HoZac, Zoo Music, Captured Tracks, Sub Pop, Hell, Yes!
- Past members: Kristin "Dee Dee Penny" Gundred; Jules Medeiros; Sandra "Sandy" Vu; Andrew Miller; Katie "Bambi Davies" Serbian; Frankie Rose; Jeremy Rojas; Andrew Montoya; Brandon Welchez; Mike Sniper; Chuck Rowell; Malia James

Dum Dum Girls were an American rock band, formed in 2008. It began as the bedroom recording project of singer and songwriter Dee Dee Penny (née Kristin Gundred). The name is a double homage to the Vaselines' album Dum Dum and the Iggy Pop song "Dum Dum Boys".

== History ==
=== 2008–2009: Early releases and formation ===
After moderate success with the three-piece rock band Grand Ole Party, frontwoman Kristin Gundred relocated to Los Angeles, California in 2008 to launch a solo project, Dum Dum Girls. The first release under the Dum Dum Girls moniker was a five-song self-entitled CDR on her own label, Zoo Music, in late 2008. It was followed by the "Catholicked" EP on Captured Tracks and a 7-inch on HoZac Records, released in February 2009. Now using the stage name Dee Dee Penny, Dum Dum Girls made its debut performance at the Woodsist Fest in July 2009 before being signed to Sub Pop Records a week later. Also in 2009 was the release of the second EP Yours Alone.

Soon thereafter, Penny, who wanted an all-girl band, recruited friend and drummer Frankie Rose (formerly of Crystal Stilts who opened for Dum Dum Girls at the Woodsist Fest earlier in the year), before adding bassist Katie Serbian "Bambi Davies", and guitarist Jules Medeiros, to officially create the Dum Dum Girls band. The group met for the first time in October 2009, three days before making their debut at the CMJ Music Marathon, where they were pronounced #1 Best Band.

=== 2010–2011: Success with I Will Be and Only in Dreams ===
Dum Dum Girls' debut album as a band, I Will Be, was released in March 2010 and was well received by critics. Pitchfork described the songs as "genuine earworms, both unfailingly hip and often wonderfully associative". I Will Be was produced by Dee Dee, along with Richard Gottehrer. The record also included guest guitarists Nick Zinner and Brandon Welchez (Dee Dee's then-husband) of Crocodiles, on "Blank Girl". After its release, Dee Dee assembled a touring band, and their first shows were in support of Girls. In February 2010, Rolling Stone reported that Dum Dum Girls, amongst other artists, would be featured on the compilation album Chicken's in Love. Around July, drummer Sandy Vu was brought in to replace Rose, who had previously been touring with Dum Dum Girls and performing with her own band, Frankie Rose and the Outs. Also in 2010, the band toured with Vampire Weekend and the Vaselines, and opened for MGMT in Europe. In December, Paste placed Dum Dum Girls at the No. 9 spot on their "20 Best New Bands of 2010" list.

In January 2011, Dum Dum Girls ranked No. 17 on the 2010 Pitchfork Readers Poll for "Best New Artist". In March, the band's EP He Gets Me High was released, which included a cover of "There Is a Light That Never Goes Out" by the Smiths. This record marked the addition of Sune Rose Wagner of the Raveonettes to the production team.

On June 30, Dum Dum Girls announced their second studio album, Only in Dreams, along with the succeeding European and North American tour. The album's singles "Coming Down" and "Bedroom Eyes" were promotionally released on July 19, and August 30, respectively. Only in Dreams was released on September 27 to generally positive reviews. The album marked the only Dum Dum Girls recording to feature the full band. On December 1, 2011, Dum Dum Girls performed "Bedroom Eyes" on Late Night with Jimmy Fallon. The album went on to be included in numerous year-end-lists including "The Top 10 Albums of 2011" by The Big Takeover, The Georgia Straight, and The New York Times. "Coming Down" was also featured in numerous television series and films, including the soundtrack for the 2013 film The Canyons.

=== 2012–2016: End of Daze, Too True, and disbandment ===
In June 2012, the band announced their fourth EP End of Daze, with new member, bassist Malia James, replacing Davies. End of Daze was released in September, preceded by the single "Lord Knows" on July 31, 2012, which Pitchfork awarded "Best New Track". The EP's songs "Mine Tonight", "I Got Nothing" and "Trees and Flowers" were previously recorded in February 2011 for Only in Dreams, but were scrapped for being far too different from the rest of the album. The EP received "Best New Music" from Pitchfork as well.

On October 31, 2013, Dum Dum Girls announced their third and final studio full-length album Too True, set for release on January 28, 2014. The featuring single "Lost Boys & Girls Club", whose video premiered with H&M on October 31, 2013. For this album, Dee Dee cited Suede, Blondie, Siouxsie and the Banshees, the Pretenders, Madonna and the Stone Roses as her influences. On December 5, 2014, Converse released a Dum Dum Girls split single, "On Christmas", as the third part of three digital installments of the company's holiday-themed compilation EP, Noise to the World 2. The band performed their last performance together in May 2015.

In July 2016, amidst the announcement of a solo album, frontwoman Dee Dee Penny, who had now abandoned the pseudonym for "Kristin Kontrol", told The Line of Best Fit: "Dum Dum Girls is over as far as I can tell right now. I'm a singer and songwriter; I only need one vehicle. I had to step out of [the band] because the music I want to make doesn't fit into that mold anymore.

== Influences ==
Dum Dum Girls has sited the Shangri-Las and Jesus and Mary Chain as their influences.

== Other projects ==
In 2012, Dum Dum Girls drummer Sandra Vu created the band Sisu, which she described as combining "echo-ridden, cold, distorted synth sounds—with pop melodies".

On January 28, 2016, Dee Dee announced the closure of the Dum Dum Girls and the creation of a new solo project, Kristin Kontrol. Her debut album, X-Communicate, was released by Sub Pop on May 27, 2016.

== Band members ==
=== Final line-up ===
- Dee Dee Penny (Kristin Gundred) – vocals, guitar (2008–2016)
- Jules Medeiros – guitar, vocals (2010–2016)
- Malia James – bass, vocals (2011–2016)
- Sandra Vu – drums, vocals (2010–2016)
- Andrew Miller – guitar

=== Former members ===
- Bambi Davies (Katie Brouillette Serbian) – bass, vocals (2010–2011)
- Frankie Rose – drums, vocals (2010)
- Jeremy Rojas – bass
- Andrew Montoya – drums
- Brandon Welchez – guitar
- Chuck Rowell – keyboard

== Discography ==
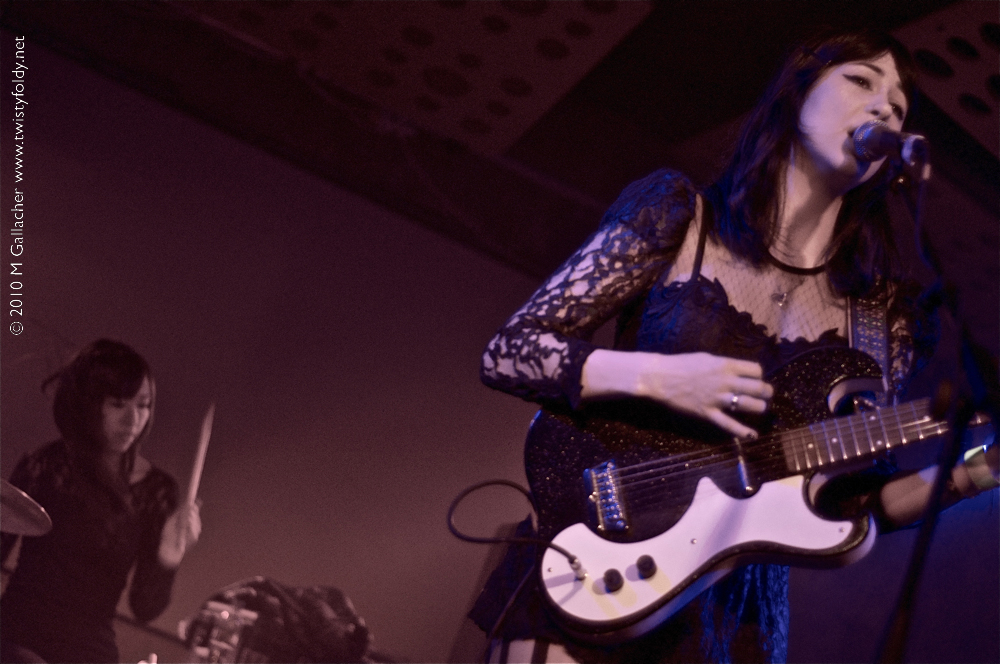
Dum Dum Girls in 2010

=== Studio albums ===
Title	Album details	Peak chart positions		
Title	Album details	US	US Heat	UK
I Will Be	Released: March 30, 2010; Label: HoZac Records; Formats: 12" vinyl LP	—	15	9 (Note: I Will Be charted at No. 40 on the UK Independent Albums Chart, but peaked at No. 8 on the UK Independent Album Breakers Chart.)
Only in Dreams	Released: September 27, 2011; Label: Sub Pop; Formats: CD, digital download, LP record	105	1	38
Too True	Released: January 22, 2014; Label: Sub Pop; Formats: CD, digital download, LP record	20 (Note: Too True charted at No. 73 on the Billboard 200, but peaked at No. 20 on the US Top Rock Albums chart)	—	3 (Note: Too True entered the UK Independent Albums Chart at No. 23, but peaked at No. 3 on the UK Independent Album Breakers Chart.)
"—" denotes a title that did not chart, or was not released in that territory.

=== EPs ===
- Dum Dum Girls (2008, Zoo Music)
- Dum Dum Girls (2009, Captured Tracks)
- He Gets Me High (2011, Sub Pop)
- End of Daze (2012, Sub Pop)

=== Singles ===
- "Longhair" (2008, HoZac Records)
- "Jail La La" (2010, Sub Pop)
- "Pay for Me/Before It's Gone" split with Male Bonding (2010, Sub Pop)
- "Stiff Little Fingers" (2010, Hell Yes! Records)
- "Bhang Bhang, I'm a Burnout" (2010, Slumberland Records)
- "Coming Down" (2011, Sub Pop)
- "Merry Xmas, Baby (Please Don't Die)" with Crocodiles (2011, Hell Yes! Records)
- Rookie Tunes split flexi disc with Supercute! (2012, Drawn & Quarterly)
- "Lord Knows"" (2012, Sub Pop)
- "Lost Boys & Girls Club" (2013, Sub Pop)
- "Rimbaud Eyes" (2014, Sub Pop)
- "On Christmas" (2014, self-released)
- "Coming Down (Edit)" (2015, Sub Pop)
- "Red Sun" with Merchandise (2016, Sub Pop)

=== Compilation albums ===
- Blissed Out cassette (2010, Art Fag Recordings)

=== Compilation appearances ===
- "Longhair" on Rough Trade Shops Indiepop 09 (2009, Cooperative Music)
- "Longhair" and "Mercury Mary" on HoZac Hookup Klub Round One (2010, HoZac Records)
- "Brite Futures" on Yeti 7 (2010, Yeti Publishing LLC)
- "Brite Futures" on 7-inch EP Hollow Hollow Eyes/Moon Tan/Brite Futures/The Weekend Starts Here (2010, Art Fag Recordings)
- "New Beginning" on Chickens in Love (2010, 826LA/Origami)
- "Jail La La" on The Hyper Fidelity (2010, Cargo Records)
- "Coming Down (Radio Edit)" on Hand Picked: Sub Pop 2011 from Ours to Yours (2011, Sub Pop)
- "Lost Boys and Girls Club" on Hey! Ho! Let's Go! (15 Tracks of the Best New Music) (2013, Uncut)
- "Coming Down" on The Canyons (Original Motion Picture Soundtrack) (2013, SQE Music)
- "On Christmas" on digital EP Noise to the World 2 (2014, Converse)
- "I Was Never Punk" on Stupid Punk Boy (2015, Girlsville)
- "Coming Down" on Music from the Original Series Orange Is the New Black Seasons 2 & 3 (2015, Universal Music Enterprises)
- "Letter to Hermione" (David Bowie cover) on A Salute to the Thin White Duke – The Songs of David Bowie (2015, Cleopatra Records)

=== Videos ===
- "Catholicked"
- "Jail La La"
- "Blank Girl"
- "Bhang Bhang, I'm a Burnout"
- "He Gets Me High"
- "Bedroom Eyes"
- "Coming Down"
- "Lord Knows"
- "Lost Boys & Girls Club"
- "Too True to Be Good"
- "Are You Okay?"
- "Rimbaud Eyes"
- "Under These Hands"
