= Rah-rah skirt =

Type of skirt popular in the 1980s

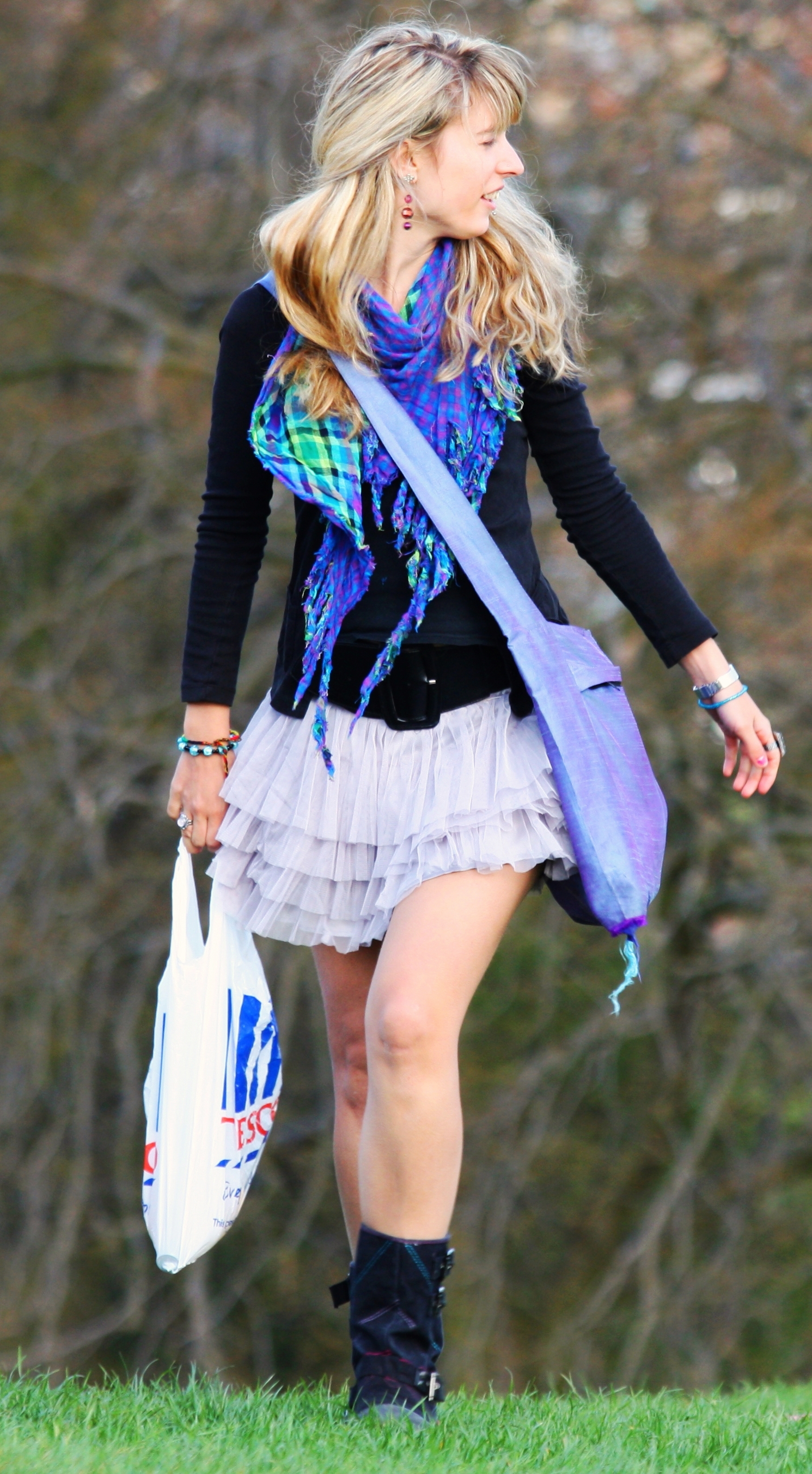
A woman wearing a rah-rah skirt in the United Kingdom, 2010

The rah-rah (or ra-ra) skirt is a short flounced, layered skirt that originated in cheerleading and became a popular fashion trend among teenage girls in the early 1980s. It marked, as the Oxford Dictionary noted, the first successful attempt to revive the miniskirt that had been introduced in the mid-1960s.

While the rah-rah skirt originated in cheerleading, it was introduced to mainstream fashion in 1982. It was popular in the 1980s until the mini skirt regained popularity, but the rah-rah experienced a resurgence in 2008.

Gifi Fields claims to have co-created the rah-rah skirt alongside designer Angela Stone, but there are claims that the skirt was originally created by Norma Kamali.

Examples of the rah-rah could be seen on the covers of music albums such as Since Yesterday by Strawberry Switchblade (1984).

== Etymology ==
Rah-rah is a reduplication of an abbreviation for "hurrah", which is used as a synonym for "cheering".

== History ==
The rah-rah skirt was originally popularized in the early 1980s as an attempt at reviving the miniskirt, which had fallen out of fashion. It was based on the skirts worn by cheerleaders, which were designed to be short and flouncy to add flare to their performance.

Later in the 1980s, it was often worn with leather, denim or lace.

In the 1990s, the miniskirt regained popularity on its own, leading to the rah-rah largely falling out of style. The rah-rah eventually made a comeback in Britain in 2008, with a headline in London Lite proclaiming: "Eighties look is all the ra-rave."
