= Crime of passion (disambiguation) =

A crime of passion refers to violence, especially murder, that the perpetrator commits because of sudden strong impulse.

Crime of passion or crimes of passion may also refer to:

== Film and television ==
- Crime of Passion (1957 film), directed by Gerd Oswald
- Crimes of Passion (1984 film), directed by Ken Russell
- Crimes of Passion (2013 film), directed by Gao Qunshu
- Crimes of Passion (TV series), a Swedish television series
- Crimenes de Lujuria (Crimes of Passion), a 2011 Mexican direct-to-video film featuring Alejandra Ambrosi
- Love Crime, directed by Alain Corneau

== Literature ==
- A Crime of Passion, a novel by Mary Higgins Clark
- Crimes of Passion, a play by Joe Orton
- Crime of Passion, a character play by Jérôme Pradon
- Crime Passionel, also known as Dirty Hands, a 1948 play by Jean-Paul Sartre

== Art ==
- Crime passionnel, oil painting by Nils von Dardel

== Music ==
- Crimes of Passion (Pat Benatar album), 1980 release from Chrysalis Records
- Crimes of Passion (Big Head Todd and the Monsters album), 2004
- Crimes of Passion (Crocodiles album), 2013 release from French Kiss Records
- "Crime of Passion" (Mike Oldfield song), 1984 recording
- "Crime of Passion" (Ricky Van Shelton song), 1987 recording
- "Crime of Passion", from the 1975 album Unrequited by Loudon Wainwright III
- "Crime of Passion", from the 1985 album Eaten Alive by Diana Ross
- “Crime of Passion”, from the 1986 album All Right Now by Pepsi & Shirlie
- "Crime of Passion", from the 2006 album Edge of the World by Glenn Tipton
