= Let Her Go (Strawberry Switchblade song) =

Single by Strawberry Switchblade
- B-side: "Beautiful End", "Michael Who Walks by Night"
- Released: March 1985
- Recorded: 1984–1985
- Genre: Synth-pop, new wave
- Length: 2:47
- Label: Korova / WEA
- Songwriters: Rose McDowall, Jill Bryson
- Producer: Phil Thornalley

Strawberry Switchblade singles chronology
"Since Yesterday" (1984)	"Let Her Go" (1985)	"Who Knows What Love Is?" (1985)

Audio
- "Let Her Go" on YouTube

"Let Her Go" is a song performed by Scottish new wave duo Strawberry Switchblade. It was their third single, released just ahead of their self-titled debut album in 1985.

It is one of two tracks from the album that were produced by Phil Thornalley.

== Background and composition ==
The song was first recorded in an indie-pop style under the title "Linda" for a BBC Radio 1 session for David Jensen on 3 October 1982. The same session included "Dance", the song that would evolve into "Since Yesterday". Guest musicians on the session included James Kirk from band Orange Juice, as well as Alex Fergusson.

Member Rose McDowall reportedly hated the first note of "Let Her Go" with such a vengeance that she "willed it to catch fire in the studio."

== Recording and release ==
The song was originally planned to be the follow-up to their debut single "Trees and Flowers" in 1983. A Melody Maker feature dated 8 October that year reported:

A second single, "Let Her Go", is due out soon… sessions for that album are currently taking place using the same musicians who play on the new single. They include Weekend’s Simon Booth (guitar), Scritti’s Tom (drums) and John Cook on bass.

That version was never completed, and "Since Yesterday" was issued as their second single instead.

"Let Her Go" was released in the UK as the follow-up to "Since Yesterday" by Korova, an imprint of WEA, on 7”, 12”, and a limited edition strawberry-shaped picture disc.

The B-side was "Beautful End", and the 12" featured an additional track, "Michael Who Walks By Night", which had a rare lead vocal by Bryson.

Both "Beautiful End" and "Michael Who Walks By Night" were recorded for a BBC Radio 1 Janice Long session on 22 September 1984 and had been licensed from the BBC for use on this single.

Outside the UK, the 7" was released in Western Europe and Japan. It was also released in the Philippines with the same version of Let Her Go on both sides of the single. Later, a Filipino 12" was released with an extended mix on one side.

== Critical reception ==
Publication Smash Hits had their singles reviewed that issue by a 12-year-old reader who stated, "another single from this sugary twosome. Confused vocals with much the same backing as the rather-better "Since Yesterday". Give it another go, girls."

Sounds said "The Strawberry gals come up with a new un in the best traditions of the Sixties follow-up; you had a hit, so don’t f*** with the formula! The nursery-rhyme Spector style is still pleasing, but on first listen doesn’t go for the jugular as smoothly as their last effort."

No. 1 magazine was more positive, saying it "sounds like one of those groovy records they used to make in the Swinging 60s – a touch of psychedelia, some tight harmonies and a 'neat' melody. If you have to live in the past I guess the 60s are as good a time as any."

== Remix ==
A 4:50 extended version of "Let Her Go", subtitled "Kitchensynch Mix-Up", was released as the bonus track on the 12" of their follow-up single "Who Knows What Love Is?". It was remixed by Bill Drummond, David Balfe, Phil Harding, Stephen Short and Youth.

It was subsequently issued on the 12" single of "Let Her Go" in the Philippines, and on the Japanese compilation album The 12" Album.

== Charts ==
Despite recent success of "Since Yesterday" and strong promotion including a TV advertising campaign, the single failed to enter the UK top 40. In a five-week run in the top 100, it peaked at number 59 on 13 April 1985.

== Track listings ==
7" single

1. "Let Her Go" – 2:47
2. "Beautiful End" – 4:01

12" Single

1. "Let Her Go" – 2:47
2. "Beautiful End" – 4:01
3. "Michael Who Walks by Night" – 3:39

== Charts ==
Chart (1984–85)	Peak position
European Airplay Top 50 (Eurotipsheet)	45
UK Singles Chart	59
