= End of Daze =

EP by Dum Dum Girls
- Released: September 25, 2012
- Recorded: 2012
- Genre: Indie rock, shoegaze
- Length: 18:06
- Label: Sub Pop
- Producer: Richard Gottehrer and Sune Rose Wagner

Dum Dum Girls chronology
Only in Dreams (2011)	End of Daze (2012)	Too True (2014)

Singles from End of Daze
- 1. "Lord Knows" Released: July 31, 2012

End of Daze is the fourth EP by Dum Dum Girls, released September 25, 2012 by Sub Pop. This was the third Dum Dum Girls recording produced by Richard Gottehrer and the Raveonettes' Sune Rose Wagner, and the fourth overall for Gottehrer.

== Background ==
Three songs from the EP ("Mine Tonight", "I Got Nothing" and "Trees and Flowers") were originally recorded for 2011's Only in Dreams, but were put aside for being "too different" and "atmospheric". These songs were intended to be used as B-sides; the cover of Strawberry Switchblade's "Trees and Flowers" was meant to accompany "Bedroom Eyes" on an unreleased 7" single. The remaining songs were recorded a year later in Chelsea, Manhattan.

"Lord Knows" was released as a single on July 31, 2012.

== Reception ==
Professional ratings
Review scores
Source	Rating
Pitchfork	8.3/10
Consequence	C+
NME	3.5/5 stars

Pitchfork awarded End of Daze its "Best New Music" designation, with a score of 8.3. In her review, Lindsay Zoladz wrote, "Garage rock is also a genre of quick burnouts, its best compilations scattered with one- or no-hit wonders whose most explosive fireworks burned bright for three minutes before vanishing altogether. So perhaps the most profound way that the Dum Dum Girls have transcended their influences is the simple fact that they've stuck around, pushed past their limits, and gotten that much better. End of Daze is their best release. Much more than a stop-gap between LPs, it's succinct but irrefutable proof that this band's dynamite has a long fuse."

== Track listing ==
All tracks are written by Dee Dee, except where noted.

No.	Title	Length
1.	"Mine Tonight"	3:26
2.	"I Got Nothing"	3:16
3.	"Trees and Flowers" (Jill Bryson, Rose McDowall)	4:01
4.	"Lord Knows"	4:18
5.	"Season in Hell"	3:04
Total length:		18:06

== Release history ==
Country	Date	Format	Label
Canada	September 25, 2012	CD, digital download, vinyl	Sub Pop
United States	September 25, 2012	CD, digital download, vinyl	Sub Pop

The first 900 copies of the vinyl version of the EP were released on clear vinyl as a "Loser Edition".
