= Blissed Out =

Blissed Out may refer to:

- Blissed Out (The Beloved album), 1991
- Blissed Out (Dum Dum Girls album), 2010
