= Dum Dum Girls (2009 EP) =

Yours Alone / Dum Dum Girls

EP by Dum Dum Girls
- Released: September 9, 2009
- Recorded: 2009
- Genres: Indie rock, shoegaze, noise pop, post-punk revival
- Length: 11:41
- Label: Captured Tracks

Dum Dum Girls chronology
Dum Dum Girls (2008)	Yours Alone / Dum Dum Girls (2009)	I Will Be (2010)

Dum Dum Girls, also known as Yours Alone, is the second EP by Dum Dum Girls, released on September 9, 2009, by Captured Tracks. It was only available on 12-inch vinyl. It included an early version of the title track, which also would later appear on the band's debut album, I Will Be.

== Track listing ==
All songs written and composed by Dee Dee, except as noted.

No.	Title	Length
1.	"Catholicked" (chorus lifted from Patti Smith's intro to her cover of "Gloria")	2:38
2.	"Hey Sis"	3:25
3.	"Put a Sock in It"	3:26
4.	"Yours Alone"	2:15
Total length:		11:41
