= Smith Westerns (album) =

Studio album by Smith Westerns
- Released: June 5, 2009
- Genre: Indie rock; garage rock; lo-fi
- Length: 29:05
- Label: HoZac Records; Fat Possum

Smith Westerns chronology
Smith Westerns (2009)	Dye It Blonde (2011)

Professional ratings
Review scores
Source	Rating
AllMusic	4/5 stars
Pitchfork	7.7/10

Smith Westerns is the self-titled debut album by the indie rock band Smith Westerns, released on June 5, 2009, on HoZac Records and in 2010 on Fat Possum Records.

== Track listing ==
No.	Title	Length
1.	"Dreams"	2:39
2.	"Boys are Fine"	2:37
3.	"Gimme Some Time"	2:13
4.	"Girl in Love"	3:01
5.	"We Stay Out"	3:18
6.	"Tonight"	3:34
7.	"Be My Girl"	3:21
8.	"The Glam Goddess"	2:34
9.	"Diamond Boys"	2:53
10.	"My Heart"	2:59
Total length:		29:05
