= He Gets Me High =

EP by Dum Dum Girls
- Released: March 1, 2011
- Recorded: 2011
- Length: 13:44
- Label: Sub Pop
- Producer: Richard Gottehrer; Sune Rose Wagner

Dum Dum Girls chronology
Blissed Out (2010)	He Gets Me High (2011)	Only in Dreams (2011)

He Gets Me High is the third extended play (EP) by Dum Dum Girls, released on March 1, 2011, through Sub Pop.

== Promotion ==
A music video for the song "He Gets Me High" was released March 29, 2011.

== Reception ==
Professional ratings
Aggregate scores
Source	Rating
Metacritic	76/100
Review scores
Source	Rating
The A.V. Club	A
Consequence of Sound	3.5/5 stars
No Ripcord	8/10 stars
Paste	(8.2/10)
Pitchfork	(8.1/10)
PopMatters	5/10 stars
Prefix	8/10 stars

The album received generally positive reviews upon its release. At Metacritic, which assigns a rating out of 100 to reviews from mainstream critics, the album received an average score of 76, based on 11 reviews, which indicates "Generally favorable reviews".

== Track listing ==
All songs written by Dee Dee, except where noted.

No.	Title	Length
1.	"Wrong Feels Right"	2:31
2.	"He Gets Me High"	3:00
3.	"Take Care of My Baby"	4:00
4.	"There Is a Light That Never Goes Out" (Johnny Marr, Morrissey)	3:48
Total length:		13:44
