= I Will Be (album) =

Studio album by Dum Dum Girls
- Released: March 30, 2010
- Genre: Indie pop
- Labels: HoZac Records, Sub Pop
- Producer: Richard Gottehrer

Dum Dum Girls chronology
Dum Dum Girls (2009)	I Will Be (2010)	Blissed Out (2010)

Singles from I Will Be
- 1. "Jail La La" Released: February 16, 2010; 2. "Bhang Bhang, I'm a Burnout" Released: November 23, 2010; 3. "It Only Takes One Night" Released: 2010

I Will Be is the first album by Dum Dum Girls, released on March 30, 2010. The first pressing by HoZac Records was released as a 12" vinyl LP with a black-and-white version of the current album art. After the band later signed to Sub Pop, the album was rereleased in 2010 on both CD and 12" vinyl with the full colored cover.

Three singles were issued from I Will Be: "Jail La La", released by Sub Pop as a 7" single on February 16, 2010; "Bhang Bhang, I'm a Burnout", released as a 7" single on November 23, 2010, by Slumberland Records; and "It Only Takes One Night", released by Sub Pop as a promo-only CD-R.

== Composition ==
Dee Dee produced the record with Richard Gottehrer, who had previously worked with Richard Hell, Blondie, The Go-Go's and the Raveonettes. The record included guest guitarists Nick Zinner of Yeah Yeah Yeahs on "Yours Alone"; Dee Dee's then-husband Brandon Welchez of Crocodiles, on "Blank Girl"; and Andrew Miller on multiple tracks. The albums third track, "Oh Mein M", is sung entirely in German, which was inspired by Penny's (who studied in Germany for a year in college) enjoyment of writing in the language.

== Album cover ==
The woman on the album cover is Penny's mother circa 1972. The off-guard photo was taken after Penny's mother and her friends decided to take their college senior portraits and bought false eyelashes. Penny discovered the photo while going through her mother's photo albums, describing: "I just turned the page and saw that picture and was like, "Something about that is exactly my record.'" The album's initial cover was to be a stillshot from the 1969 women-in-prison film 99 Women, to complement its working title, "Jail La La" (the album's fourth track), however, the idea was shelved due to copyright issues.

== Reception ==
Professional ratings
Review scores
Source	Rating
AllMusic	3.5/5 stars
BBC Music	Positive
The Guardian	4/5 stars
NME	8/10 stars
Pitchfork	(8.2/10)
Q	8/10 stars
Spin	4/5 stars

The album received generally positive reviews upon its release. At Metacritic, which assigns a normalized rating out of 100 to reviews from mainstream critics, the album received an average score of 79, based on 23 reviews, which indicates "Generally favorable reviews".

== Legacy ==
Reflecting on it ten years later, Stereogum's James Rettig dubbed I Will Be "a precursor to the summer of 2010's big trend" that included "sunny harmonies and fuzzy distortion" and bands like Best Coast and Wavves. He felt it "worth holding up as an exemplar" of its era's music due to how well it still stood up.

== In popular culture ==
"It Only Takes One Night" was used on the soundtrack of the 2010 EA Sports video game FIFA 11, while "Bhang Bhang, I'm a Burnout" was used on the soundtrack of the 2011 Atari video game Test Drive Unlimited 2.

== Track listing ==
All tracks are written by Dee Dee, except where noted.

No.	Title	Length
1.	"It Only Takes One Night"	2:02
2.	"Bhang Bhang, I'm a Burnout"	2:34
3.	"Oh Mein M"	2:12
4.	"Jail La La"	2:31
5.	"Rest of Our Lives"	3:02
6.	"Yours Alone"	2:16
7.	"Blank Girl"	2:54
8.	"I Will Be"	2:07
9.	"Lines Her Eyes"	2:24
10.	"Everybody's Out"	2:58
11.	"Baby Don't Go" (Sonny Bono)	3:50

iTunes bonus track
No.	Title	Length
12.	"Fuzz Love"	2:53

Japanese bonus tracks
No.	Title	Length
12.	"Pay for Me"	2:34
13.	"Play with Fire" (Nanker Phelge)	3:04

Sub Pop pre-order bonus EP
No.	Title	Length
1.	"Ship of Love"	1:45
2.	"Longhair"	2:57
3.	"Dream Away Life"	4:17
4.	"Catholicked" (Patti Smith)	2:38
5.	"Hey Sis"	3:25

== Personnel ==
- Dee Dee – vocals, guitar, bass guitar, drum programming
- Richard Gottehrer – producer
- Alonzo Vargas – mixing

== Release history ==
Country	Date	Format	Label
Canada	March 30, 2012	CD, digital download, LP record	Sub Pop
United States	March 30, 2012	CD, digital download, LP record	Sub Pop

The first 200 copies of the LP version of the album were released on gold vinyl onby HoZac Records. An undisclosed number of Sub Pop vinyls were released on blood red and black marbled vinyl.
