= Coming Down (Dum Dum Girls song) =

- MP3 cover

Single by Dum Dum Girls

from the album Only in Dreams
- A-side: "Coming Down (Edit)"
- B-side: "Crystal Baby"
- Released: July 19, 2011
- Recorded: 2011
- Studio: Pink Duck Studios (Glendale, California)
- Genre: Indie pop
- Length: 6:29
- Label: Sub Pop
- Songwriter: Kristin Gundred
- Producers: Richard Gottehrer; Sune Rose Wagner

"Coming Down" is a song by American rock band Dum Dum Girls, written by frontwoman Dee Dee Penny and co-produced by Richard Gottehrer and Sune Rose Wagner. It was released on July 19, 2011, as the first single from the bands sophomore album Only in Dreams (2011).

== Composition ==
A noticeable departure from the other songs on the album, "Coming Down" began as a scratch track. In a 2011 interview with Pitchfork, Penny said, "I knew it was going to be an oddball but I also knew it was good and showcased a side of me that doesn't come out in those two-minute pop songs." While mixing the record at producer Richard Gottehrer's New York studio, she met The Ronettes member Ronnie Spector, who after hearing the song, complimented Penny's vocals, saying, "Oh, I can hear your vocals, you need to turn [them] all up."

While recording the demo, Penny described composing the track's bridge: "I had been singing that note. But when we recorded it as a scratch track in the studio, I sang a much lower note. When I overdubbed my vocals, I was like, "OK, I'm going to try something– bear with me." Everybody was like, "Holy shit, you have to do that." The note was so difficult to nail twice. It's very much at the top of my range."

== Critical reception ==
The song was praised by Evan Minsker of Pitchfork, who described the song as a ballad and complimented the song's depth and Penny's vocal ability, saying in part, "there's a resolve and confidence in Dee Dee's voice when she sings, "by tomorrow, I'll be gone," which gives the song a sense of not-kidding urgency." Minsker went on to compare the chord progression of the song to that of Mazzy Star's "Fade Into You". Beats Per Minute writer Aurora Mitchell rated the song an 8/10, writing: "A sobering effort compared to old material, "Coming Down" is like a mellow come-down from a hazy drug trip. Slow and lovelorn, [it] wouldn't sound out of place as a track on a heartbreakingly romantic 80s film soundtrack.

== Music videos ==
The official music video was released on March 28, 2012, by Sub Pop Records' YouTube channel. Directed by then-forthcoming band vocalist and bassist Malia James, the slow motion, black and white video depicts bandleader Dee Dee staring at the camera as people approach her and cut off her clothes with scissors, a direct homage to Japanese activist Yoko Ono's 1964 performance art Cut Piece. With limited outfits, the video was profusely rehearsed and shot in a single take.

In 2011, prior to the album's release, Penny had worked with friend and director Sam Macon to create the music videos for both "Coming Down" and "Bedroom Eyes", the album's second single. The original music video for "Coming Down" depicted band members Penny and Sam, along with friends, walking the streets of New York City's Chinatown to the Williamsburg Bridge. Against the insistence of Macon, Sub Pop, and her management, Penny decided to scrap the video. On July 21, 2015, after "Coming Down" was featured in an episode of Netflix's comedy-drama Orange Is the New Black the month prior, the original music video (once again in black and white) was formally released by Sub Pop.

== Use in media ==
"Coming Down" has been heavily featured in television and film, including the drama series The Secret Circle (2011), Gossip Girl; Revenge (both 2012), The Vampire Diaries (2013), the 2013 erotic thriller film The Canyons (starring Lindsay Lohan and James Deen), the comedy drama Orange Is the New Black (2015), the 2018 post-apocalyptic horror film Bird Box (starring Sandra Bullock), and the teen drama Trinkets (2019).

== Track listing ==
All tracks are written by Kristin Gundred.

Vinyl, 7", 45 RPM
No.	Title	Length
1.	"Coming Down"	3:56
2.	"Crystal Baby"	2:22
Total length:		6:18

CD single (2012)
No.	Title	Length
1.	"Coming Down (Radio Edit)"	3:59
2.	"Coming Down (Album Version)"	6:31
Total length:		10:30

MP3, Reissue (2015)
No.	Title	Length
1.	"Coming Down (Edit)"	4:13
2.	"Girls Intuition"	2:49
Total length:		7:02
