= Alone in the City =

Alone in the City may refer to:

- "Alone in the City", a 1949 song by Ray Charles
- "Alone in the City", a movement in Kenny Burrell's Asphalt Canyon Suite (1969)
- "Alone in the City, a song on the 2015 album Music for Dogs by Gardens & Villa
- Alone in the City, a 2018 album by the Dreamcatcher (group)
