= Midnight Movies (album) =

Studio album by Midnight Movies
- Released: August 31, 2004
- Recorded: Sonikwire Studios, Irvine, California
- Genre: Psychedelic pop; indie rock; dream pop
- Length: 46:29
- Label: Emperor Norton
- Producer: Fulton Dingley

Midnight Movies chronology
Midnight Movies (2004)	Lion the Girl (2007)

Singles from Midnight Movies
- 1. "Mirage" Released: 2004; 2. "Persimmon Tree" Released: 2004

Professional ratings
Review scores
Source	Rating
AllMusic	3.5/5 stars
Pitchfork Media	7.2/10
Slant Magazine	2/5 stars

Midnight Movies is the debut studio album by the American indie rock band, Midnight Movies. It was released on August 31, 2004, through Emperor Norton Records.

== Track listing ==
All tracks are written by Gena Olivier, Jason Hammons and Larry Schemel.

No.	Title	Length
1.	"Persimmon Tree"	3:55
2.	"Love or a Lesson"	3:17
3.	"Blue Babies"	3:13
4.	"Human Mind Trap"	4:18
5.	"Oh Twilight"	3:31
6.	"Strange Design"	4:55
7.	"Mirage"	3:36
8.	"Words for a Love Song"	5:48
9.	"Just to Play"	5:30
10.	"Tide and Sun"	4:21
11.	"Time and Space"	4:05
Total length:		46:29

Japanese edition bonus tracks
No.	Title	Length
13.	"Breathing in Dust"	4:43
14.	"Chris' Song"	2:41
Total length:		53:53

== Credits ==
Midnight Movies

- Gena Olivier – vocals, drums, organ
- Jason Hammons – keyboards
- Larry Schemel – guitars, bass guitar

Additional personnel

- Diego Miralles – cello (track 8)
- Probyn Gregory – horn (track 8)
- Fulton Dingley – engineering, production, mixing
- J. D. Andrew – additional vocal production (tracks 1–7, 9, 11)
- Jason Maston, Alex Bush, Matt Brown – engineering
- Joe Gastwirt – mastering
