= Dunes (album) =

Studio album by Gardens & Villa
- Released: February 4, 2014
- Genre: Indie rock
- Length: 39:32
- Label: Secretly Canadian
- Producer: Tim Goldsworthy

Gardens & Villa chronology
Gardens & Villa (2011)	Dunes (2014)	Music for Dogs (2015)

Professional ratings
Aggregate scores
Source	Rating
Metacritic	66/100
Review scores
Source	Rating
The 405	7.5/10
AllMusic	3.5/5 stars
musicOMH	3/5 stars
Paste	8.6/10
Pitchfork	6.2/10
Slant Magazine	4/5 stars
This Is Fake DIY	3/5 stars
Under the Radar	6.5/10

Dunes is the second studio album by American rock band Gardens & Villa. Produced by Tim Goldsworthy it was released on February 4, 2014, on Secretly Canadian.

The band recorded the album at Key Club in Benton Harbor, Michigan. The group spent a month in the space working on the record, only leaving five times throughout the process. The album title was inspired by one of these ventures out of the studio to Michigan's sand and snow dunes.

With the album announcement, Gardens & Villa released the first single from the album, "Bullet Train". The album received generally favorable reviews.

== Track listing ==
No.	Title	Length
1.	"Domino"	4:05
2.	"Colony Glen"	4:19
3.	"Bullet Train"	3:58
4.	"Chrysanthemums"	3:46
5.	"Echosassy"	3:24
6.	"Purple Mesas"	5:23
7.	"Avalanche"	4:33
8.	"Minnesota"	4:07
9.	"Thunder Glove"	4:33
10.	"Love Theme"	1:24
