= Smith Westerns =

American indie rock band

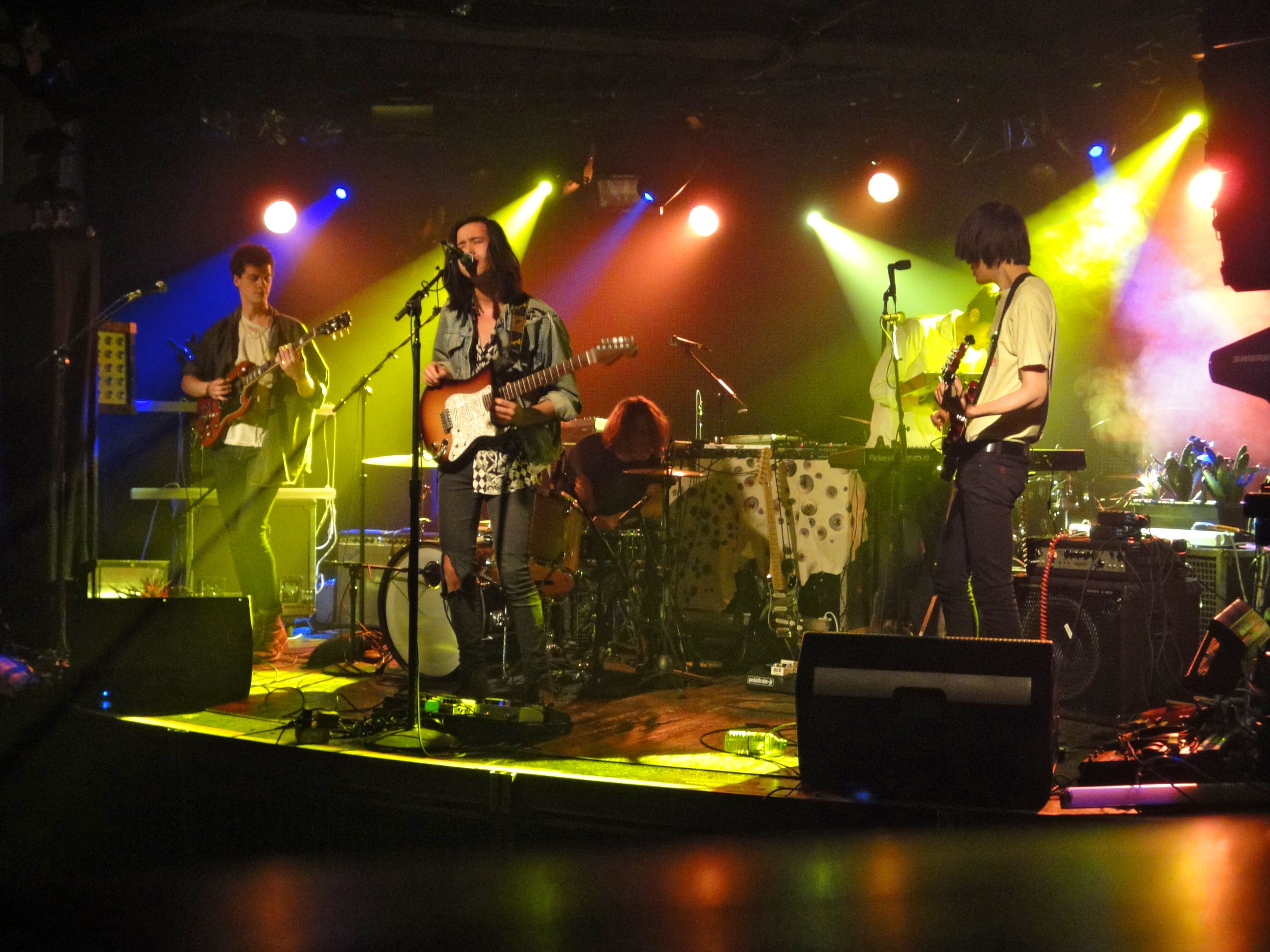
- Smith Westerns performing at Belly Up Aspen in 2011.

Background information
- Origin: Chicago, Illinois, United States
- Genres: Indie rock; glam rock; garage rock
- Years active: 2007–2014
- Labels: Mom + Pop Music; Fat Possum; Weird World; HoZac Records; Transparent; Bachelor
- Past members: Cullen Omori; Cameron Omori; Max Kakacek; Julien Ehrlich; Hal James
- Website: www.smithwesternsmusic.com

Smith Westerns were an American indie rock band from Chicago, Illinois, United States, composed of brothers Cullen and Cameron Omori, Max Kakacek, Julien Ehrlich and Hal James. Their musical influences included David Bowie, T. Rex and Oasis.

== History ==
=== Smith Westerns (2009) ===
Their self-titled debut album was released on HoZac Records on June 5, 2009. Most of the album was recorded throughout the winter and early spring in Max Kakacek's basement.

=== Dye It Blonde (2011) ===
They released a new single, "Weekend", on November 4, 2010, from their album Dye It Blonde, which was released on January 18, 2011.

=== Soft Will (2013) ===
The band signed to Mom + Pop Music on March 5, 2013, and released Soft Will on June 25, 2013, following up from their 2011 LP, Dye It Blonde. The first single off the album, "Varsity," was released March 6, 2013. The album has received mostly positive reviews upon release.

=== Later work and breakup ===
On December 13, 2014, the band announced that they would go on an indefinite hiatus. They later confirmed that they were permanently breaking up.

Since the breakup, Cullen Omori began a solo career, signing to Sub Pop Records, while Max Kakacek, Julien Ehrlich, and touring keyboardist Ziyad Asrar formed the band Whitney.

== Discography ==
=== Studio albums ===
Title	Details	Peak chart positions				
Title	Details	US	US Indie	US Alt	US Rock	US Heat
Smith Westerns	Release date: June 5, 2009; Label: HoZac Records; Formats: CD, music download, vinyl	—	—	—	—	—
Dye It Blonde	Release date: January 18, 2011; Label: Fat Possum Records; Formats: CD, music download, vinyl	114	18	20	29	1
Soft Will	Release date: June 25, 2013; Label: Mom + Pop Music; Formats: CD, music download, vinyl	194	—	—	—	—
"—" denotes releases that did not chart

=== Singles ===
Year	Single	Album
2010	"Weekend"	Dye It Blonde
2013	"Varsity"	Soft Will
