= Endless Flowers =

Studio album by Crocodiles
- Released: June 5, 2012
- Genre: Noise pop
- Length: 41:28
- Label: French Kiss

Crocodiles chronology
Sleep Forever (2010)	Endless Flowers (2012)	Crimes of Passion (2013)

Singles from Endless Flowers
- 1. "Sunday (Psychic Conversation #9)" Released: April 10, 2012; 2. "Endless Flowers" Released: May 8, 2012

Professional ratings
Aggregate scores
Source	Rating
Metacritic	66/100
Review scores
Source	Rating
AllMusic	3.5/5 stars
musicOMH	4/5 stars
Pitchfork Media	6.5/10
This Is Fake DIY	9/10

Endless Flowers is the third studio album by American rock band Crocodiles. It was released in June 2012 under French Kiss Records.

== Track listing ==
No.	Title	Length
1.	"Endless Flowers"	4:35
2.	"Sunday (Psychic Conversation #9)"	3:11
3.	"No Black Clouds for Dee Dee"	3:10
4.	"Electric Death Song"	3:48
5.	"Hung Up on a Flower"	6:35
6.	"My Surfing Lucifer"	5:04
7.	"Dark Alleys"	5:25
8.	"Bubblegum Trash"	4:09
9.	"Welcome Trouble"	2:49
10.	"You Are Forgiven"	2:42
11.	"I'm Not A Young Man Anymore (ITunes Only Bonus Track)"	3:08
12.	"Sunday (Psychic Connection) (ITunes Only Bonus Track)"	2:49
