= Midnight Movies =

American indie rock band

- Origin: Los Angeles
- Genres: Psychedelic pop, Indie rock
- Years active: 2002–2008
- Labels: Emperor Norton, New Line
- Past members: Jason Hammons; Gena Olivier; Larry Schemel; Ryan Wood; Sandra Vu

Midnight Movies was an indie rock band formed in Los Angeles, California in 2002. Composed of Gena Olivier (vocals, drums), Larry Schemel (guitar), and Jason Hammons (keyboards, guitar), the indie rock trio quickly crafted a moody and stylish sound. They became a major face on the L.A. music scene within a year, and earned a nomination for Best New Artist at the L.A. Weekly Music Awards in May 2003. Just as their self-released six-song EP arrived, Midnight Movies received another nomination for Best Pop/Rock band in spring 2004. Midnight Movies' self-titled studio-length debut was released on Emperor Norton the following August. The group resurfaced in 2007 with Lion the Girl, which featured new bassist Ryan Wood and drummer Sandra Vu, with Olivier handling keyboard and vocal duties and production by Steve Fisk. The band's final show was at Spaceland (now The Satellite) on June 16, 2008 and have since broken up to pursue other projects or to spend time with family.

== Band members ==
Current members

- Gena Olivier – lead vocals, organ, drums
- Larry Schemel – guitars
- Sandra Vu – drums, flute, vocals, keyboard
- Ryan Wood – bass guitar, keyboards, guitars

Former members

- Jason Hammons – keyboards, guitars

== Discography ==
=== Albums ===
- Midnight Movies (2004)
- Lion The Girl (2007)

=== EP ===
- Strange Design EP (2003)
- Nights EP (2008)

=== Singles ===
- Mirage (2004)
- Persimmon Tree (2004)
- Patient Eye (2004)
