= Trees and Flowers =

Single by Strawberry Switchblade
- B-side: "Go Away", "Trees and Flowers (Just Music)"
- Released: July 1983
- Recorded: 1983
- Genre: Folk-pop; new wave
- Length: 3:50
- Label: 92 Happy Customers
- Songwriters: Rose McDowall, Jill Bryson
- Producers: David Balfe, Bill Drummond

Strawberry Switchblade singles chronology
"Trees and Flowers" (1983)	"Since Yesterday" (1984)

Audio
- "Trees and Flowers" on YouTube

"Trees and Flowers" is a song performed by Scottish band Strawberry Switchblade. It was their debut single in 1983, and a subsequently released demo version has become one of their most popular tracks.

== Background and composition ==
Despite the band's usual new wave indie pop style, "Trees and Flowers" is a reflective ballad in a folk-pop vein.

Although band members Jill Bryson and Rose McDowall officially credited all songs to both of them equally, " Trees and Flowers" was written by Bryson on her own.

In contrast to the gentle tune and soft vocal harmonies, the lyrics' main refrain is "I hate the trees and I hate the flowers, and I hate the buildings and the way they tower over me."

They describe Bryson's agoraphobia, something that had affected her teenage years so severely that she had missed a year of school.

The band recorded two sessions for BBC Radio 1 in October 1982. These were heard by David Balfe and Bill Drummond, who made contact and became their managers. The Peel session had included "Trees and Flowers", and it was this track that made the biggest impression on Drummond:

Dave Balfe told me about that and maybe he’d got a tape of it, a tape that included "Trees and Flowers". I remember as soon as I heard that song I thought it was fantastic. Absolutely genius song.

== Recording and release ==
The song was recorded as the band's first single. Produced by Balfe and Drummond, it was given a baroque arrangement by Nicky Holland, and featured guest appearances from Kate St John, Aztec Camera 's Roddy Frame, and the rhythm section from Madness, Mark Bedford and Dan Woodgate.

It was released in the UK in July 1983 on the independent record label 92 Happy Customers, owned by Will Sergeant, guitarist of Echo & the Bunnymen.

The 12" single featured an instrumental version, "Trees and Flowers (Just Music)".

In 1985, a limited repress of the 7" was issued on Korova and given away with initial copies of the band's debut album.

== Critical reception ==
Smash Hits made it their single of the fortnight. Reviewer Peter Martin praised its "deliciously sad and reflective vocals over some luxuriantly delicate music ... the song is an immediate classic". In NME, Gavin Martin stated that "this is as alluring as '80s psychedelia is likely to get" and described it as "slightly perverse in its appeal – music for grey spots and dazed comedowns".

Record Mirror was less effusive, with Mike Gardner calling it as "a mite disappointing. It sounds like a computer designed dreamy summer single."

It was included in John Peel's 1983 Festive 50, his listeners' poll of the best tracks of the year.

== Later releases and reissues ==
An extended version, essentially combining the single and instrumental versions, was created for a 1985 Japanese release The 12" Album. This version was included as one of the bonus tracks on CD reissues of the band’s eponymous album and a subsequent compilation The Platinum Collection.

Though the original single version has appeared on several various artist compilation albums, apart from the copies given away with the band’s debut album it has never been reissued and is not on streaming services.

The band's earliest studio recordings, three songs recorded in 1982 when they were still a quartet, were released as a limited edition 7" EP in January 2017.

== Recorded versions ==
=== Demo, recorded 1982 ===
- Rose McDowall (guitar, vocals)
- Jill Bryson (guitar, backing vocals)
- Janice Goodlett (bass)
- Carole McGowan (drums)

Released on "1982 4-Piece Demo" EP (Night School Records, LSSN048), 2017.

=== Peel session, recorded 4 October 1982 ===
- Rose McDowall (guitar, vocals)
- Jill Bryson (guitar, backing vocals)
- James Kirk (bass)
- Shahid Sarwar (drums)
- Alex Fergusson (piano, guitar)
- Babs Shores (backing vocals)

Unreleased.

=== Single, recorded 1983 ===
- Rose McDowall (guitar, vocals)
- Jill Bryson (guitar, backing vocals)
- Nicky Holland (horn and oboe arrangement, piano)
- Mark Bedford (bass)
- Dan Woodgate (drums)
- Kate St John (oboe)
- Roddy Frame (additional guitar)
- Adam Harding (French horn)

Released on 7" and 12" singles (92 Happy Customers, HAPS001 and HAPT001), 1983.

Reissued on 7" (Korova, SAM240) with initial copies of the Strawberry Switchblade album, 1985.

=== Instrumental version ===
Personnel as per the single, except for the vocals.

Released on 12" single (92 Happy Customers, HAPT001), 1983.

=== Extended version ===
Personnel as per the single.

Released in Japan on "The 12" Album" (Warner Pioneer, P6219), 1985.

== Cover versions ==
A number of other artists have released recordings of the song.

- Dum Dum Girls - "End of Daze" EP (Sub Pop, SP1001), USA, 2012
- The Shapists - single released on Bandcamp, 2014. This was a band featuring Jill Bryson.
- Haruna Yusa - "Spring Has Sprung" (My Best! Records, MYRD86), Japan, 2015
- Sulis Noctis - single released on streaming services, 2022
- Dave Leo Baker - "Piano Reflections vol.1", released on streaming services, 2022
- BooBooSousa - single released on streaming services, 2022
- The Penkiln Burn Players - "Voices From The Galloverse" (Penkiln Burn Recordings, PBR 017), UK, 2024. This is a project of Bill Drummond's.
