= Dye It Blonde =

Studio album by Smith Westerns
- Released: January 18, 2011
- Genre: Indie pop
- Length: 35:22
- Label: Fat Possum
- Producer: Chris Coady

Smith Westerns chronology
Smith Westerns (2009)	Dye It Blonde (2011)	Soft Will (2013)

Dye It Blonde is the second studio album by the band Smith Westerns, released on January 18, 2011 on Fat Possum Records.

== Critical reception ==
Professional ratings
Aggregate scores
Source	Rating
Metacritic	80/100
Review scores
Source	Rating
AllMusic	4/5 stars
The A.V. Club	A−
Consequence of Sound	C+
One Thirty BPM	(89%)
Paste	8.1/10
Pitchfork	8.4/10
Rolling Stone	3.5/5 stars
Slant Magazine	3/5 stars
Spin	9/10
Tiny Mix Tapes	4/5 discs

Dye It Blonde received acclaim from contemporary music critics. At Metacritic, which assigns a normalized rating out of 100 to reviews from mainstream critics, the album received an average score of 80, based on 30 reviews, which indicates "generally favorable reviews".

== Track listing ==
All tracks are written by Cullen Omori and Max Kakacek.

No.	Title	Length
1.	"Weekend"	3:22
2.	"Still New"	4:12
3.	"Imagine Pt. 3"	3:34
4.	"All Die Young"	3:47
5.	"Fallen in Love"	2:30
6.	"End of the Night"	3:26
7.	"Only One"	3:24
8.	"Smile"	4:11
9.	"Dance Away"	2:46
10.	"Dye the World"	4:10
Total length:		35:22
