= Blissed Out (Dum Dum Girls album) =

Compilation album by Dum Dum Girls
- Released: July 13, 2010
- Recorded: 2007–2009
- Genres: Indie rock, shoegaze, noise pop, post-punk revival
- Length: 29:14
- Label: Art Fag

Dum Dum Girls chronology
I Will Be (2010)	Blissed Out (2010)	He Gets Me High (2011)

Blissed Out is a compilation album by Dum Dum Girls, released on July 13, 2010, by Art Fag. The album contains various pre-Sub Pop original recordings and covers, compiled for the first time. It was released only on blue, red, pink, and grey cassettes limited to 400 pressings, which sold out.

The cover is a screenshot from a German soft porno called Schulmädchen.

== Track listing ==
All songs written by Dee Dee except where noted.

No.	Title	Length
1.	"Ship of Love"	1:45
2.	"Hey Sis"	3:24
3.	"Throw Aggi Off the Bridge" (Black Tambourine)	2:18
4.	"Catholicked" (chorus lyrics by Patti Smith)	2:38
5.	"Let It Be Me" (Gilbert Bécaud, Mann Curtis, Pierre Delanoë)	1:47
6.	"Mercury Mary"	1:52
7.	"Brite Futures"	2:45
8.	"Put a Sock in It"	3:23
9.	"M.Y.O.B." (Delta 5)	2:15
10.	"Longhair"	2:57
11.	"Dream Away Life"	4:17
Total length:		29:14
