= Strawberry Switchblade (album) =

1985 studio album by Strawberry Switchblade

Studio album by Strawberry Switchblade
- Released: 5 April 1985
- Recorded: 1984
- Genres: New wave; pop
- Length: 34:04
- Label: Korova / WEA
- Producers: David Motion, Phil Thornalley

Strawberry Switchblade chronology
Strawberry Switchblade (1985)	The 12" Album (1985)

Singles from Strawberry Switchblade
- 1. "Since Yesterday" b/w "By the Sea" Released: October 1984; 2. "Let Her Go" b/w "Beautiful End" Released: April 1985; 3. "Who Knows What Love Is?" b/w "Poor Hearts" Released: June 1985

Professional ratings
Review scores
Source	Rating
Allmusic	link
No. 1 magazine	4/5 stars
Paste	9.2/10
Smash Hits	8/10 stars
Musik Express Sounds	5/6 stars
Record Mirror	2/5 stars
Sounds	1.5/5 stars

Strawberry Switchblade is the only studio album released by the Scottish new wave duo Strawberry Switchblade.

== Release ==
The album did not live up to the high chart expectations created by the #5 (UK) single "Since Yesterday". It entered and peaked at #25 on the UK Album Chart in April 1985, but dropped out of the top 40 after two weeks and spent just two further weeks at the lower reaches of the chart.

The album was promoted by two additional singles: the first, "Let Her Go", peaked at #59 on the UK Singles Chart in April during a five week chart run and the final single, "Who Knows What Love Is?", reached #84 in May.

"Since Yesterday" also charted in Ireland and the Netherlands where it reached #6 and #24 respectively.

"Let Her Go" was considered a "sure hit" by the pan-European magazine Eurotipsheet and gained enough airplay to reach number 45 on the European Airplay Top 50 chart. Despite this, it did not became a major hit and did not chart on sales charts outside the United Kingdom.

The original Strawberry Switchblade LP has not been re-released in the UK (or in Europe) since 1985, though all of its tracks (apart from the short instrumental reprise of "Who Knows What Love Is?") appeared on the group's Platinum Collection compilation. In Japan, where the group were extremely popular, it was issued on CD for the first time in 1989, and released again there on CD in 1997 in a 20-track expanded version, including B-sides, remixes and non-album singles.

== Critical reception ==
The album received mixed reviews. Smash Hits reviewer Chris Heath found that "Every song here has an irresistibly catchy tune", especially pointing out "the sad 'Who Knows What Love Is?'" as "quite lovely".

No. 1 magazine was similarly positive, saying "there's talent beneath the Alice's Tea Party costumes. Singer Rose McDowall and guitarist Jill Bryson have put faith in their ability to write engaging, sometimes haunting pop songs."

In contrast, Betty Page wrote in Record Mirror "this is desperately lightweight and quite relentlessly tedious"

Melody Maker's Ted Mico was also dismissive: "Though their combined efforts are as frail and pasty as puff pastry, the Strawberries accentuate their vulnerability by juxtaposing flouncy, celestial harmonies swaythed in strumming semi-acoustics with the merciless sten-gun drum attack".

Danny Kelly of New Musical Express was similarly disparaging, describing the band as "the Cocteaus' trance dance stance in a less imposing frame. A confection of candyfloss and icing sugar. But great pop music? Even good pop music? I’m afraid not."

== Track listing ==
All songs written by Jill Bryson and Rose McDowall, except where noted.

=== Original release ===
Side one
No.	Title	Length
1.	"Since Yesterday"	2:55
2.	"Deep Water"	3:54
3.	"Another Day"	3:49
4.	"Little River"	2:38
5.	"10 James Orr Street"	2:55

Side two
No.	Title	Length
6.	"Let Her Go"	2:45
7.	"Who Knows What Love Is?"	3:45
8.	"Go Away"	3:07
9.	"Secrets"	2:49
10.	"Who Knows What Love Is?" (Reprise)	1:03
11.	"Being Cold"	4:11

=== Expanded edition bonus tracks ===
No.	Title	Writer(s)	Length
12.	"Beautiful End"		4:01
13.	"Poor Hearts"		3:17
14.	"Ecstasy (Apple of My Eye)"	Ray Barnes, Daisuke Inoue	3:30
15.	"Jolene"	Dolly Parton	3:52
16.	"Black Taxi"	David Balfe, Jill Bryson, Rose McDowall, Mulhearne	3:47
17.	"Trees and Flowers" (Extended Mix)		6:43
18.	"Michael Who Walks by Night"		3:43
19.	"Since Yesterday" (Extended Mix)		6:31
20.	"I Can Feel"		3:41

=== B-sides ===
Title	Single
"Beautiful End"	"Let Her Go"
"Black Taxi"	"Jolene"
"By the Sea"	"Since Yesterday"
"Ecstasy (Apple of My Eye)"	"Ecstasy (Apple of My Eye)" (1985 Japan standalone single)
"I Can Feel"	"I Can Feel" (1986 Japan standalone single)
"Jolene"	"Jolene" (1985 standalone single)
"Michael Who Walks by Night"	"Let Her Go" (12" single)
"Poor Hearts"	"Who Knows What Love Is?"
"Sunday Morning"	"Since Yesterday" (12" single)
"Trees and Flowers"	"Trees and Flowers" (1983 standalone U.K. single)

== Personnel ==
Strawberry Switchblade

- Jill Bryson – vocals, harmonies, lead guitar
- Rose McDowall – lead vocals, harmonies, guitars

with:

- Gary Hutchins – sequences, keyboards
- Alan Park – keyboards
- Bruce Nockles – trumpet
- Dave Morris – percussion
- David Motion – keyboards, drum machine
- Phil Thornalley – keyboards
- Boris Williams – "tippy tappy" drums
- David Bedford – string and woodwind arrangements
- Andrew Poppy – horn arrangements on "10 James Orr Street"

Technical

- David Motion – production, arrangements, engineering
- Phil Thornalley – production, engineering on "Let Her Go" and "Who Knows What Love Is?"
- Trig – engineering
- Peter McArthur – photography
- Chris Branfield – design

"Thanks to David Balfe and Bill Drummond"

== Charts ==
Chart performance for Strawberry Switchblade
Chart (1985)	Peak position
European Top 100 Albums (Music & Media)	82
UK Albums (Official Charts)	25

== Release history ==
Country	Date	Label	Format	Catalog	Notes	Ref.
United Kingdom	April 1985	Korova / WEA	Vinyl	KODE 11 / 240525-1		
United Kingdom	April 1985	Korova / WEA	Cassette	240525-4		
Japan	25 April 1985	Korova	Vinyl	P-13120		
Japan	25 April 1985	Korova	Cassette	PKG-3115		
Japan	10 July 1989	Korova / WEA	CD	18P2-2856		
Japan	25 May 1997	Korova / WEA Japan	CD	WPCR-1093	Expanded edition	
Japan	22 November 2006	Korova / WEA	CD	WPCR-75254	Expanded edition; Repress	
Japan	24 July 2013	Korova	CD	WPCR-78061	Expanded edition; Repress	
United Kingdom	20 June 2017	Domino Music	Digital Download	REWIG124D	Expanded edition	

== The 12" Album ==
The 12" Album

Remix album by Strawberry Switchblade
- Released: November 28, 1985
- Recorded: 1985
- Genres: Electronic; rock
- Length: 36:50
- Labels: Korova; WEA
- Producers: Various: Bill Drummond; Clive Langer; Clive Langer; David Balfe; David Motion; Phil Thornalley

The 12" Album was a remix album released in Japan in November 1985. The album contains 5 extended mixes, one standalone single and one B-side.

Despite the name of the album, only two of the remixes had previously appeared on 12" singles, these being the mixes of "Let Her Go" (from the 12" release of "Who Knows What Love Is?") and "Jolene" (from that single's 12" release). The other three mixes were specially done for this remix album and were not released in the United Kingdom.

The extended mix of "Since Yesterday" later appeared as the B-side of the Strawberry Switchblade's final single "I Can Feel" in 1986.

No.	Title	Length
1.	"Let Her Go" (Extended Mix)	4:45
2.	"Trees and Flowers" (Extended Mix)	6:40
3.	"Since Yesterday" (Extended Mix)	6:30
4.	"Jolene" (Extended Mix)	6:12
5.	"Michael Who Walks By Night"	3:41
6.	"Who Knows What Love Is?" (Extended Mix)	5:33
7.	"Ecstasy (Apple of My Eye)"	3:29
Total length:		36:50

=== Release history ===
Country	Date	Label	Format	Catalog
Japan	28 November 1985	Korova / WEA	LP	P-6219
Japan	28 November 1985	Korova / WEA	Cassette	PKF1034
Canada	2000	Communique Records	CD	CDCOMM-5
