= Sleep Forever =

Studio album by Crocodiles
- Released: September 14, 2010
- Recorded: 2010 Rancho de la Luna
- Genres: Noise pop, indie pop, post-punk revival, psychedelic rock, lo-fi
- Label: Fat Possum
- Producer: James Ford

Crocodiles chronology
Summer of Hate (2009)	Sleep Forever (2010)	Endless Flowers (2012)

Singles from Sleep Forever
- 1. "Sleep Forever" Released: 2010

Professional ratings
Aggregate scores
Source	Rating
Metacritic	69/100
Review scores
Source	Rating
Artrocker	(negative)
Clash	8/10 stars
Filter	8/10 stars
NME	8/10 stars
Nylon	(positive)
Pitchfork	(6.8/10)
Q	3/5 stars
The Quietus	(positive)
Spin	7/10 stars
Vice	8/10 stars

Sleep Forever is the second album by San Diego rock band Crocodiles. It was released by American label Fat Possum Records the year after the band's debut, Summer of Hate. Sleep Forever was recorded in Rancho de la Luna a vintage studio in Joshua Tree in California's Mojave Desert by James Ford of Simian Mobile Disco. The record incorporates various styles and shows krautrock, indie, noise rock, psychedelic, shoegaze, drone rock, and '60s girl-group influences. Additional musicians on the album include the band's touring keyboard player Robin Eisenberg and producer James Ford, who played drums.

Reviewers have noted the often macabre lyrical content of the songs. Sleep Forever was featured on NME and Rough Trade 's albums of the year lists.

== Track listing ==
Standard edition
No.	Title	Length
1.	"Mirrors"	5:23
2.	"Stoned to Death"	5:32
3.	"Hollow Hollow Eyes"	2:52
4.	"Girl in Black"	5:05
5.	"Sleep Forever"	4:11
6.	"Billy Speed"	3:32
7.	"Hearts of Love"	4:02
8.	"All My Hate and My Hexes are For You"	4:47
Total length:		35:24

Special edition
No.	Title	Length
1.	"Groove Is In the Heart/California Girls"	2:55
2.	"Jet Boy Jet Girl"	3:52
3.	"Hearts of Love (Cold Cave Remix)"	4:06
4.	"Mirrors (Tom Furse Horrors Remix)"	4:46
Total length:		15:39
