= Sandra Vu =

American musician, singer and songwriter

Sandra Vu (also known as "Sandy Vu") is an American musician, singer and songwriter.

== Career ==
Vu is the lead singer for her band Sisu, which she launched in 2009. Following the self-released 2009 Demon Tapes EP and 2010 single "Sharp Teeth", Sisu released the Blood Tears studio album and Light Eyes EP, both in 2013 on the Mono Prism label.

In 2011, Vu joined American rock band Dum Dum Girls as drummer, making her debut on the 2011 album Only in Dreams.

Vu previously performed as the drummer for the band Midnight Movies, as well as with the Raveonettes.

== Discography ==
- Take Comfort in Strangers (2005, with the Valley Arena - vocals)
- Hearts and Unicorns (2005, with Giant Drag - flute)
- Lion the Girl (2007, with Midnight Movies - composer, drums)
- Nights EP (2008, with Midnight Movies - composer, drums)
- Friends (2009, with Luke Top - flute)
- Only in Dreams (2011, with Dum Dum Girls - drums)
- "Jackie Oh" single (2012, with Cheap Curls)
- Indoor Voices EP (2012, with Indoor Voices - vocals)
- The Midnight Mass (2013, with Louise Burns - drums)

=== With Sisu ===
- Demon Tapes EP (2009)
- "Sharp Teeth" single (2010)
- Blood Tears (2013)
- Light Eyes EP (2013)
