= Soft Will =

Studio album by Smith Westerns
- Released: June 25, 2013
- Length: 39:02
- Label: Mom + Pop Music
- Producer: Chris Coady

Smith Westerns chronology
Dye It Blonde (2011)	Soft Will (2013)

Singles from Soft Will
- 1. "Varsity" Released: March 12, 2013

Professional ratings
Aggregate scores
Source	Rating
Metacritic	73/100
Review scores
Source	Rating
Allmusic	4/5 stars
NME	8/10
This Is Fake DIY	8/10
Pitchfork	7.9/10
MusicOMH	3.5/5 stars
Drowned in Sound	7/10
Paste Magazine	6.4/10
Filter Magazine	76%
Consequence of Sound	3/5 stars
The A.V. Club	C

Soft Will is the third and final studio album by American indie rock trio Smith Westerns. It was released in June 2013 under Mom + Pop Music, and produced by Chris Coady. It is the band's final album, as they broke up on December 13, 2014.

== Track listing ==
No.	Title	Length
1.	"3 A.M. Spiritual"	4:23
2.	"Idol"	4:14
3.	"Glossed"	3:06
4.	"XXIII"	4:28
5.	"Fool Proof"	4:26
6.	"White Oath"	4:03
7.	"Only Natural"	3:49
8.	"Best Friend"	3:48
9.	"Cheer Up"	2:45
10.	"Varsity"	4:00
