= Too True =

Studio album by Dum Dum Girls
- Released: January 22, 2014
- Recorded: 2012–2013
- Studio: EastWest Studios (Los Angeles)
- Genre: Indie pop
- Length: 30:16
- Label: Sub Pop
- Producers: Richard Gottehrer; Sune Rose Wagner

Dum Dum Girls chronology
End of Daze (2012)	Too True (2014)

Singles from Too True
- 1. "Lost Boys & Girls Club" Released: December 17, 2013; 2. "Rimbaud Eyes" Released: January 28, 2014

Too True is the third and final studio album by Dum Dum Girls, released by Sub Pop on January 22, 2014 in Japan; January 27, 2014 in Europe; and January 28, 2014 worldwide. The album marked the fourth Dum Dum Girls release in a row produced by Richard Gottehrer and the Raveonettes' Sune Rose Wagner, and the fifth overall for Gottehrer. Too True is also the only studio album to solely feature the band's frontwoman Dee Dee Penny, with Wagner on additional instruments.

== Background ==
Frontwoman Dee Dee began to write Too True while touring for End of Daze, and in November 2012, she began to record the album with Gottehrer at Pet Sounds at East West Studios in Hollywood as well as the Chateau Marmont. However, Dee Dee soon realized her voice was damaged from touring, which halted recording. During this break, she rewrote lead single "Lost Boys & Girls Club" and slowly recorded the vocals herself at her New York City apartment, which she referred to as 'The Coven'.

In order to capture a new sound, Penny brought in collaborator and friend Tamaryn to creatively direct the album.

== Music ==
Too True was compared to British alternative rock bands like Siouxsie and the Banshees, the Cure, the Stone Roses, Suede, and the Jesus and Mary Chain. The production on the album featured heavy use of reverb and multiple layers of guitars.

The song "Are You Okay?" was originally written and intended for Ronnie Spector but Gottehrer convinced Dee Dee to keep it for herself.

== Promotion ==
The album and track listing were unveiled on October 31, 2013, alongside the release of the video for the first single, "Lost Boys & Girls Club," which premiered with H&M. On November 15, a teaser video for "Too True to Be Good" was released in conjunction with V. The "Lost Boys & Girls Club" single was released on December 17, 2013.

The second single from the album, "Rimbaud Eyes", premiered January 11, 2014 via Sub Pop's official SoundCloud page. NPR premiered the full album on January 20 through an exclusive "first listen" stream on their website.

The collective band performed "Rimbaud Eyes" on The Late Show with David Letterman on January 30, 2014. This appearance marked the band's second televised performance. The entire "Too True to Be Good" video was released February 19, 2014 to promote the band's North American tour.

== Album cover ==
In the cover of her first solo album, Penny wore a Yves Saint Laurent Swarovski crystal-embellished mesh bodysuit from the fashion house's 2013 fall collection, which was inspired by singer Beyoncé's pairing of a sheer bodysuit with Saint Laurent tights during her performance at the 56th Annual Grammy Awards in January.

== Critical reception ==
Professional ratings
Review scores
Source	Rating
AllMusic	4/5 stars
NME	3.5/5 stars
Pitchfork	7.4/10
PopMatters	7/10
Spin	7/10
Sputnikmusic	3.5/5

Upon its release, Too True received generally positive reviews from critics. At Metacritic, which assigns a normalized rating out of 100 to reviews from mainstream critics, the album received an average score of 72 based on 37 reviews, which indicates "generally favorable reviews". In his review published on The A.V. Club, Ryan Kyle praised the album, saying that "Too True finds Dee Dee enlisting a drum machine to give songs like 'Little Minx' and 'Evil Blooms' a much more rigid backbone than the band’s songs have had in the past". Paste hailed the record, stating that "Dee Dee’s voice is what stands out. It’s achingly emotive in its minimal range". Mojo qualified Too True as "a perfect pop balance of cliche and rawness, with mythic ambition and songs that make you a three-minute hero". Uncut wrote that it was "a bold album". No Ripcord criticized the album's production, stating that the band "needs to play to its strengths, rather than a production style" and asking, "What's the point of writing great riffs if you can't properly listen to them?".

The album reached No. 138 on the UK Albums Chart.

== Track listing ==
All tracks are written by Dee Dee.

No.	Title	Length
1.	"Cult of Love"	2:14
2.	"Evil Blooms"	2:35
3.	"Rimbaud Eyes"	3:30
4.	"Are You Okay?"	2:50
5.	"Too True to Be Good"	3:04
6.	"In the Wake of You"	2:40
7.	"Lost Boys & Girls Club"	3:24
8.	"Little Minx"	2:29
9.	"Under These Hands"	3:29
10.	"Trouble Is My Name"	4:01
Total length:		30:16

Japanese bonus track
No.	Title	Length
11.	"Girls Intuition"	2:49

Sub Pop bonus 7" vinyl
No.	Title	Length
1.	"Rimbaud Eyes"	3:30
2.	"Girls Intuition"	2:49

== Personnel ==
Adapted from Too True liner notes:

- Dee Dee – vocals, bass, guitar
- Sune Rose Wagner – additional guitar, bass, drums, and synthesizer

Recorded at East West Studios, Los Angeles and The Coven, New York City.

- Engineered by Alonzo Vargas at The Orchard, New York City.
- Mastered by Joe LaPorta at Sterling Sound, New York City.

== Release history ==
Country	Date	Format	Label
Japan	January 22, 2014	CD, digital download, LP record	Sub Pop
United Kingdom	January 27, 2014	CD, digital download, LP record	Sub Pop
Canada	January 28, 2014	CD, digital download, LP record	Sub Pop
United States	January 28, 2014	CD, digital download, LP record	Sub Pop

A limited number of copies of the LP version of the album were released on light blue and white spattered vinyl as a "Loser Edition."
