= Summer of Hate =

Studio album by Crocodiles
- Released: 2009
- Genres: Noise pop, indie pop, post-punk revival, psychedelic rock, lo-fi
- Length: 33:59
- Label: Fat Possum Records

Crocodiles chronology
Summer of Hate (2009)	Sleep Forever (2010)

Summer of Hate is the 2009 debut studio album by the San Diego band Crocodiles.

The album cover is a photo of Manson Family member Ruth Anne Moorehouse.

== Critical reception ==
Professional ratings
Aggregate scores
Source	Rating
Metacritic	69/100
Review scores
Source	Rating
AllMusic	4/5 stars
The A.V. Club	B+
Billboard	(positive)
Pitchfork Media	4.1/10
Spin	4/5 stars

The New York Times featured the album in its Critics' Choice section, saying that Summer of Hate has "some catchy choruses and efficient low-fi landscapes." In a more mixed assessment, Pitchfork Media stated, "Split between 80s noise-pop and synth-pop, Crocodiles present their smartest work on the album's OMD-like ballads.

== Track listing ==
1. "Screaming Chrome" – 0:47
2. "I Wanna Kill - 4:35
3. "Soft Skull (In My Room)" – 2:32
4. "Here Comes the Sky" – 4:15
5. "Refuse Angels" – 2:43
6. "Flash of Light" – 5:05
7. "Sleeping With the Lord" – 3:18
8. "Summer of Hate" - 3:32
9. "Young Drugs" – 7:12
