= Since Yesterday =

1984 single by Strawberry Switchblade

Single by Strawberry Switchblade

from the album Strawberry Switchblade
- B-side: "By the Sea"; "Sunday Morning"
- Released: 15 October 1984
- Genre: Synth-pop; new wave
- Length: 2:57
- Label: Korova
- Songwriters: Rose McDowall; Jill Bryson
- Producer: David Motion

Strawberry Switchblade singles chronology
"Trees and Flowers" (1983)	"Since Yesterday" (1984)	"Let Her Go" (1985)

Audio
- "Since Yesterday" on YouTube

"Since Yesterday" is a song performed by the Scottish synth-pop duo Strawberry Switchblade, the lead single from their self-titled album. It became their only major hit, peaking at number five on the UK singles chart.

== Background and composition ==
"Since Yesterday" (primarily written by Rose McDowall) was written during the early days of the band. The song was initially called "Dance" and was debuted at their live shows from 1981 to 1983. The only studio recording of "Dance" that survives is of a David Jensen BBC session the band did in October 1982, when they were still unsigned. While the musical structure stayed the same, the lyrics and vocal melody were extensively rewritten by McDowall when the duo recorded their debut album, and was eventually retitled "Since Yesterday".

In 2015, McDowall revealed that the song is about nuclear war. Other interpretations included a theme of suicide. The track's opening fanfare came from the third movement of Sibelius's Symphony No. 5 – the Finale ~1.20 from the start. The duo worked with producer David Motion and the song presented a musical change from the group, whose previous single, "Trees and Flowers", had a folk-pop sound, while "Since Yesterday" and their later album saw them embrace the synth-pop and new wave sound which was more current with the times.

The single's two non-album B-sides, "By the Sea" and a cover of The Velvet Underground's "Sunday Morning", were, just like their first single, produced by David Balfe and retained that folk-pop sound of "Trees and Flowers", however.

== Critical reception ==
Upon its release, the song received a positive reception by Smash Hits reviewer Neil Tennant who found "a wistful melody, sung in brittle harmonies which touches the heart. One of the few records this week which isn't trying to sound like something else."

== Release and chart performances ==
After releasing their debut single, "Trees and Flowers", on an independent label, the duo were signed to Korova, a sub-label of the Warner Music Group. "Since Yesterday" was chosen as the group's debut single for the label and was released on 15 October 1984. The song initially failed to become a success, entering the UK charts at number 89 at the end of October. After the Christmas period, Warners executive Rob Dickins decided to promote the song harder, and TV adverts for the single were produced, as well as several TV and magazine appearances. The marketing push worked, and the single entered the UK top 40 during the second week of January 1985, climbing to number five two weeks later. The single spent 20 weeks on the UK chart.

Internationally, the song peaked at number six in Ireland and at number24 in the Netherlands. It was released around continental Europe, Australia and Canada, but it failed to chart. The song was a big hit in Japan, where the group found their biggest fanbase, both for their music and for their lolita-esque image.

== Music video ==
The duo's first music video, directed by Tim Pope, presented them with the image they're most associated with: heavy goth-like make-up and eyeliner, polka-dot dresses, and many bows and ribbons in their hair. The video was shot partially in black and white and partially in colour: the group in black and white were dancing in a studio, surrounded by coloured dots hanging on mobiles or moving around the duo using the stop motion technique.

== Track listings ==
7-inch single

1. "Since Yesterday" – 2:57
2. "By the Sea" – 2:57

12-inch single

1. "Since Yesterday" – 2:57
2. "By the Sea" – 2:57
3. "Sunday Morning" – 2:16

The extended version of "Since Yesterday" was released on a 12-inch remix album first released in Japan in 1985.

== Charts ==
Chart (1985)	Peak position
European Top 100 Singles (Eurotipsheet)	37
European Airplay Top 50 (Eurotipsheet)	18
Ireland (IRMA)	6
Luxembourg (Radio Luxembourg)	4
Netherlands (Dutch Top 40)	36
Netherlands (Single Top 100)	24
UK Singles (Official Charts)	5

== Cover versions ==
A number of other artists have released recordings of the song. Almost half of them are artists from Japan, where Strawberry Switchblade were especially popular.

- Minipops (Wanna Have Fun, K-Tel, UK, 1985)
- Current 93 (Swastikas for Noddy, LAYLAH Antirecords, Belgium, 1988)
- Revolver (Venice 12" and CD single, Hut Records, UK, 1992)
- MariMari Rhythmkiller Machinegun (Since Yesterday EP, Cardinal Records, Japan 1995)
- mademoiselleSHORTHAIR! (Mezzo, Gyuune Cassette, Japan, 1996)
- Les Deux (Stock and Aitken Produce – Dance Covers Sensation, Cutting Edge, Japan, 1996)
- Potshot (Pots and Shots, Asian Man Records, USA, 1997)
- Current 93 (Cats Drunk on Copper, Durtro, UK, 1997)
- Hinano Yoshikawa (One More Kiss single, Pony Canyon, Japan, 1998)
- Scudelia Elecctro (Wine, Chicken and Music, Polystar, Japan, 1998)
- Wussom*Pow! (Little Darla Has A Treat For You vol.11, winter ’99, Darla Records, USA, 1999)
- MariMari Rhythmkiller Machinegun (single, Polydor, Japan, 2000)
- Tommy february6 (Everyday at the Bus Stop CD single, Defstar Records, Japan, 2001)
- Tompaulin (BBC John Peel session, 2001)
- Boyracer (Girlracer EP, 555 Recordings, USA, 2003)
- lab. (Piper, Misshitsu Neurose, Japan, 2004)
- Automat (Just Imagine Drive, Ravenna Records, USA, 2004)
- Dave House (You Are on My Frequency CD single, Gravity Dip, UK, 2005)
- Mano De Santo (En Plan Travesti – Volumen Final, Subterfuge Records, Spain, 2006)
- Rocket K (Time Machine RK, Grooovie Drunker, Japan, 2007)
- Anne Marie Almedal (The Siren and the Sage, +47 / Warner Music Norway, Norway, 2007)
- Goodbye Charlie (Gayfest 2013, Klone Records, UK, 2013)
- Geek Sleep Sheep (Hitsuji CD single, EMI / Universal Music, Japan, 2013)
- Free Kick (Potshot is Mine EP, 1138, Japan, 2014)
- Harajuku Project (Gothic Lolita Playlist, streaming services only, 2014)
- Slut Coven (Married Woman EP, streaming services only, 2018)
- Karine Polwart (Karine Polwart's Scottish Songbook, Hegri Music, UK, 2019)
- Jody and the Jerms (Flicker, self released, UK, 2022)
- Air-Con Boom Boom One San (Air-Con Boom Boom One San Republic, 22nd Century Tunes, Japan, 2024)
- Korra Rain (Hot Rawring T-Girl, HRT Records, USA, 2024)
- Jowe Head (The Other Side Of The Forest original soundtrack, Glass Modern, UK, 2024)

"Dance", the early version of "Since Yesterday", was covered as by The Umbrellas as the bonus track on the cassette version of the Maritime EP, Discontinuous Innovation Inc, USA, 2019.
