= Sisu (band) =

SISU
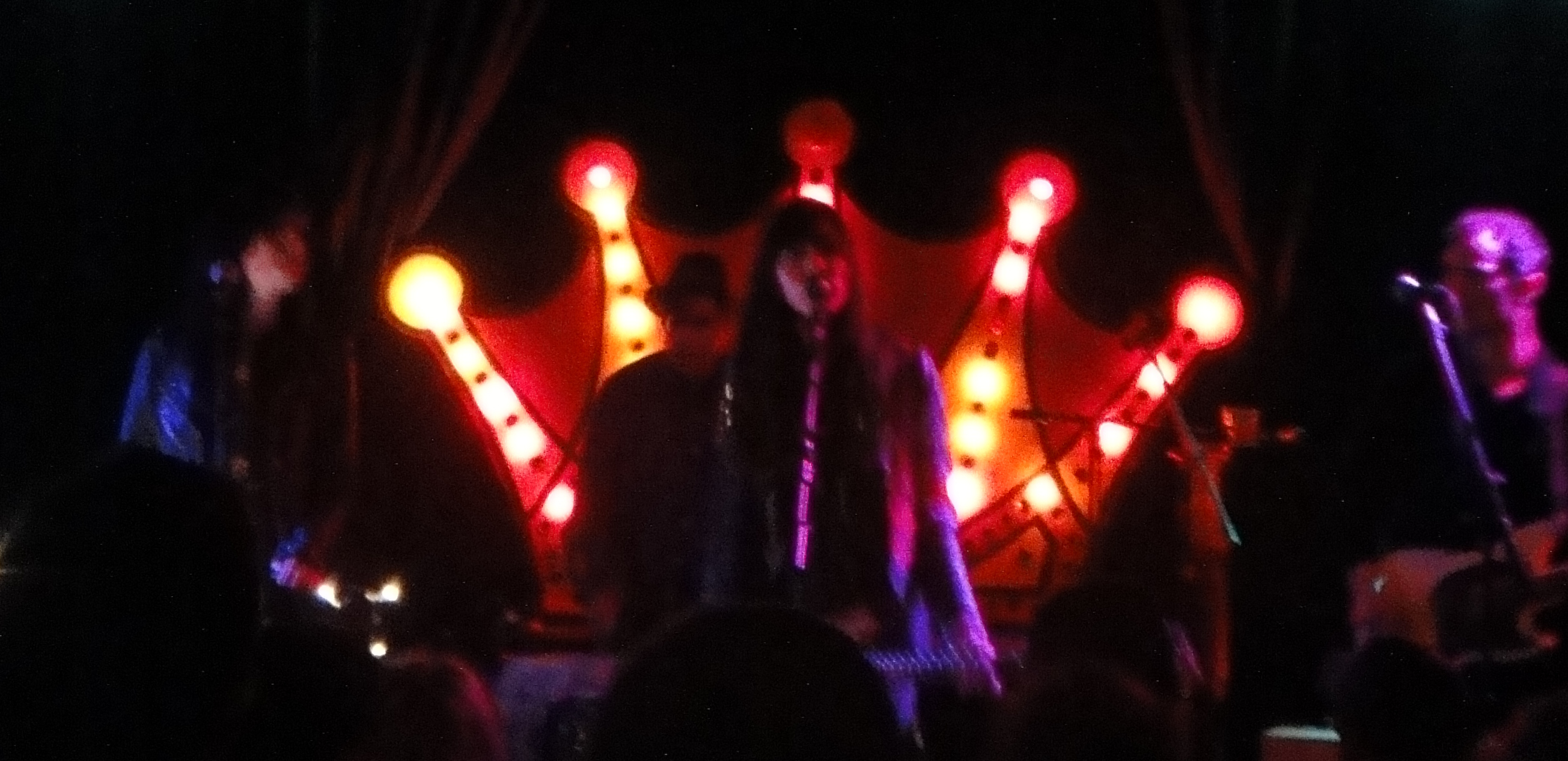
- Performing in 2013

Background information
- Origin: Los Angeles, California
- Genres: Indie rock; Indie pop; Psychedelic pop; Electronic; Shoegaze
- Years active: 2009 – Present
- Label: Mono Prism
- Members: Sandra Vu; Ryan Wood; Julianna Medeiros; David South; Nathanael Keefer; Tito Echevarria
- Website: www.sisuband.com

Sisu is an American indie rock band from Los Angeles, founded in 2009 by Sandra Vu. The band consists of Vu (vocals, guitar, flute), Ryan Wood (bass, synth), David South (bass), Julianna Medeiros (keyboards, backing vocals) and Nathanael Keefer (drums).

Sisu employs traditional and electronic instruments, and their sound has been categorized as psychedelic pop, electronic and shoegaze.

Following the self-released 2009 Demon Tapes EP and 2010 single "Sharp Teeth", Sisu released the Blood Tears studio album and Light Eyes EP, both in 2013 on the Mono Prism label.

== Discography ==
=== Studio albums ===
- Blood Tears (2013, Mono Prism)

=== Singles and EPs ===
- Demon Tapes EP (2009, self-released)
- "Sharp Teeth" single (2010, Hell, Yes! Records)
- "Light Eyes" EP (2013, Mono Prism)

=== Videos ===
- "Two Thousand Hands" (2013) by David South
- "Harpoons" (2013) by Howard Duy Vu
