= Gardens & Villa (album) =

Studio album by Gardens & Villa
- Released: July 4, 2011
- Recorded: 2010, Oregon
- Genre: Indie rock
- Length: 43:57
- Label: Secretly Canadian
- Producer: Richard Swift

Gardens & Villa chronology
Gardens & Villa (2011)	Dunes (2014)

Professional ratings
Aggregate scores
Source	Rating
Metacritic	63/100
Review scores
Source	Rating
AllMusic	3/5 stars
The A.V. Club	B
Consequence of Sound	D−
Filter	81%
Pitchfork	6.8/10
PopMatters	7/10 stars
Tiny Mix Tapes	2/5 stars

Gardens & Villa is the debut studio album by American indie rock band Gardens & Villa. Released on July 4, 2011, by independent record label Secretly Canadian, the album was recorded in Oregon over two weeks in the summer of 2010 with the help of the band's labelmate Richard Swift. The album includes the singles "Black Hills" and "Orange Blossom".

== Track listing ==
No.	Title	Length
1.	"Black Hills"	4:46
2.	"Cruise Ship"	3:07
3.	"Thorn Castles"	2:11
4.	"Orange Blossom"	4:20
5.	"Spacetime"	3:16
6.	"Chemtrails"	5:30
7.	"Star Fire Power"	4:31
8.	"Sunday Morning"	3:29
9.	"Carrizo Plain"	4:43
10.	"Neon Dove"	4:18
11.	"Orange Blossom" (Richard Swift Remix)	3:46
