= Gardens & Villa =

American indie rock band

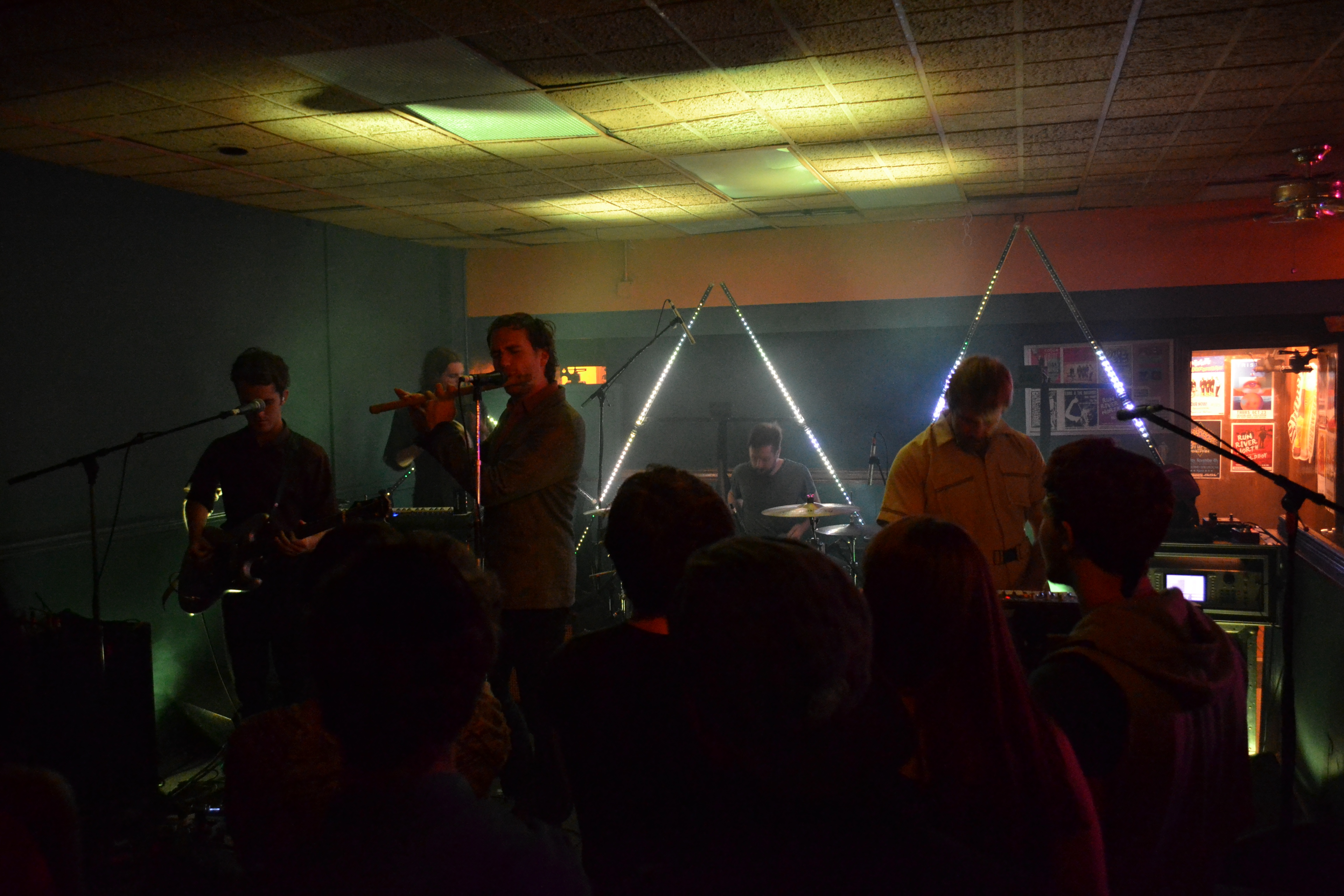
- Gardens & Villa performing in 2014

Background information
- Origin: Santa Barbara, California, United States
- Genres: Indie rock, Synthpop
- Years active: 2008-present
- Labels: Secretly Canadian
- Members: Chris Lynch; Adam Rasmussen; Shane McKillop; Levi Hayden; Dustin Ineman
- Website: Official website

Gardens & Villa is an American indie rock band from Santa Barbara, California, formed in 2008. The band consists of members Chris Lynch (guitar, flute, vocals), Adam Rasmussen (synthesizer), Shane McKillop (bass guitar), Levi Hayden (drums) and Dustin Ineman (keyboards). The band have released four albums and toured internationally.

== History ==
The band began as a three-piece featuring Chris Lynch, Adam Rasmussen and Levi Hayden in 2008. All three had previously been involved in music since their days in college. On forming Gardens and Villa, Rasmussen explained that "one of our members wanted to take a break from our punk band ... and when we reformed we wanted to focus more on songs". A stylistic experiment followed where the band explored folk and electronic influences and recorded a five-track demo. While beginning to attract a local following the band self-financed a tour. Drummer Hayden recalls that "it was a huge step forward to play out of Santa Barbara for the first time and from there we knew the sort of direction we wanted to go in". After the tour the members "decided that we were actually gonna have to do this". Shane McKilop joined them on bass in the summer of 2010, just before recording their self-titled album.

The band traveled to Oregon to work with producer Richard Swift in 2010 on their first album. While working together, they created several songs including "Black Hills" and "Orange Blossom". In 2011, Gardens & Villa signed to Secretly Canadian. The group spent much of 2011 touring, recording, and releasing music videos, including a video for "Black Hills" and "Star Fire Power". The band released their debut, self-titled album, Gardens & Villa, on July 5, 2011.

In 2012, Gardens & Villa played Coachella among several other festival dates with bands such as The Shins and Fanfarlo. They covered "Gypsy" on the 2012 Just Tell Me That You Want Me: A Tribute to Fleetwood Mac album. They also spent much of the year in Portland, Oregon, recording a new EP with Richard Swift. In November 2013, the band announced their second album, Dunes, which was released on February 4, 2014.

They released their third album Music for Dogs in August 2015.

== Discography ==
=== Studio albums ===
- Gardens & Villa (2011)
- Dunes (2014)
- Music for Dogs (2015)
- Gordon Von Zilla Presents (2020)
- Ultra Terrestrial (2024)
