= Music for Dogs =

Studio album by Gardens & Villa
- Released: August 21, 2015
- Genre: Indie rock
- Length: 36:30
- Label: Secretly Canadian
- Producer: Jacob Portrait

Gardens & Villa chronology
Dunes (2014)	Music for Dogs (2015)	Gordon Von Zilla Presents (2020)

Professional ratings
Aggregate scores
Source	Rating
Metacritic	69/100
Review scores
Source	Rating
The 405	5/10
AllMusic	3.5/5 stars
The A.V. Club	B
Consequence of Sound	C+
The Line of Best Fit	7.5/10
Pitchfork	4.7/10
PopMatters	7/10 stars
Under the Radar	6/10 stars

Music for Dogs is the third studio album by American indie rock band Gardens & Villa. Released on August 21, 2015, by independent record label Secretly Canadian. The album was orchestrated with the help of producer Jacob Portrait of Unknown Mortal Orchestra. The band hoped that Music for Dogs would maintain a wider scope than some of their other work by "making it sound just as much like the futuristic music of tomorrow as it does the classic tunes of '76".

== Track listing ==
No.	Title	Length
1.	"Intro"	0:50
2.	"Maximize Results"	3:34
3.	"Fixations"	3:53
4.	"Everybody"	3:08
5.	"Paradise"	3:58
6.	"Alone in the City"	2:59
7.	"General Research"	4:16
8.	"Express"	2:43
9.	"Happy Times"	4:26
10.	"Jubilee"	3:06
11.	"I Already Do"	3:36
