= Crimes of Passion (Crocodiles album) =

Studio album by Crocodiles
- Released: August 20, 2013
- Genre: Rock
- Length: 33:56
- Label: Frenchkiss
- Producer: Sune Rose Wagner

Crocodiles chronology
Endless Flowers (2012)	Crimes of Passion (2013)	Boys (2015)

Singles from Crimes of Passion
- 1. "Cockroach" Released: August 9, 2013

Professional ratings
Aggregate scores
Source	Rating
Metacritic	64/100
Review scores
Source	Rating
AllMusic	4/5 stars
Clash Magazine	9/10
Consequence of Sound	3.5/5 stars
Pitchfork Media	6.9/10
Slant Magazine	3.5/5 stars
This Is Fake DIY	8/10

Crimes of Passion is the fourth studio album by American duo Crocodiles. It was released on August 20, 2013, via Frenchkiss Records.

== Track listing ==
No.	Title	Length
1.	"I Like It In The Dark"	3:16
2.	"Marquis de Sade"	2:52
3.	"Cockroach"	3:01
4.	"Heavy Metal Clouds"	3:42
5.	"Teardrop Guitar"	3:18
6.	"She Splits Me Up"	3:20
7.	"Me and My Machine Gun"	4:03
8.	"Gimme Some Annihilation"	3:33
9.	"Virgin"	3:13
10.	"Un Chant d'Amour"	3:38
