= Strawberry Switchblade =

Scottish pop duo

- Strawberry Switchblade: Rose McDowall (left) and Jill Bryson (right).

Background information
- Origin: Glasgow, Scotland
- Genres: New wave; pop
- Years active: 1981–1986
- Labels: WEA, Korova
- Past members: Rose McDowall; Jill Bryson; Janice Goodlett; Carole McGowan

Strawberry Switchblade were a Scottish pop duo formed in Glasgow in 1981 by Rose McDowall and Jill Bryson. They are best known for their 1984 single "Since Yesterday", and flamboyant clothing with bows and polka dots.

== History ==
=== Early life and musical influences ===
Strawberry Switchblade emerged from a meeting between Rose McDowall and Jill Bryson within the Glasgow punk scene in the late 1970s.

According to some interviews, Rose grew up surrounded by various music genres of the 1960s thanks to her sisters, developing a particular interest in psychedelic harmonies and was inspired by the work of Lou Reed and The Velvet Underground. Her introduction to songwriting came after a concert at Glasgow Apollo, during a Stiff Records tour that included the Ramones: the energy of the show made her consider forming a band herself. Jill, on the other hand, attended the Glasgow School of Art, where she took up photography, film and painting. She got involved in the punk scene at a very young age, in 1977, when the movement was still very small in the city. These two met in this setting and became part of a group of young people recognizable for their punk aesthetic. Jill mentioned later how Rose used to work in a bakery where local punks hung out and got fired for dying her hair blue.

=== Origin of the name Strawberry Switchblade ===
The name of the band is attributed to James Kirk from Orange Juice, a band whose members Jill was personally close with. It was initially intended for a fanzine by Kirk, which he did not finish. McDowall, believing the name to be too catchy to remain unused, then used it for her band.

=== Before being signed ===
The punk movement expanded rapidly in the United Kingdom in 1976. At the time, McDowall and Bryson were part of the bohemian art scene who adored the New York Dolls and who followed Scottish punk band Nu-Sonics (later Orange Juice) during their career, with McDowall playing and recording with Paisley punk band The Poems. The group took their name from a proposed Orange Juice zine.

The female four-piece recorded one demo at Glasgow's Hellfire Club and played a handful of gigs. Janice Goodlett and Carole McGowan completed the line-up on bass and drums respectively.

Strawberry Switchblade played at a John Peel gig in Scotland, and he invited them to record a session for his BBC Radio 1 show in October 1982. They also recorded a session for David Jensen's Radio 1 show three days later. On both sessions the band were augmented by James Kirk from Orange Juice on bass and Shahid Sarwar from The Recognitions on drums.

=== Early days making records ===
The sessions were heard by Bill Drummond (Scottish musician) and David Balfe, manager and keyboard player with the recently defunct The Teardrop Explodes. They signed the band to their publishing label, Zoo Music (in partnership with Warner Bros Music). David Balfe then went on to become the group's manager.

Strawberry Switchblade's first single, "Trees and Flowers", was released in July 1983 through 92 Happy Customers, an independent record label run by Will Sergeant from Echo & The Bunnymen, and sold over 10,000 copies. Smash Hits reviewer Peter Martin praised the "deliciously sad and reflective vocals over some luxuriantly delicate music", and deemed it an "immediate classic". It featured at number 47 in John Peel's 1983 Festive 50. "Trees and Flowers" was written by Bryson about her anxiety disorder, agoraphobia. It featured Roddy Frame of Aztec Camera on guitar and was produced by Bill Drummond.

Drummond, who'd begun to work as A&R for WEA, signed the band to Warner Music Group subsidiary Korova in 1983. They got a full backing band with whom they toured and began recording an album with producer Robin Millar. However, at the record company's behest, they reverted to the duo of McDowall and Bryson and for production duties they hired David Motion, who later produced hits for Red Box.

=== "Since Yesterday" ===
In late 1984 their second single, "Since Yesterday", was released. Having been given a large marketing push over the festive period, it became a UK top-10 hit in early 1985, peaking at number 5, and also met with success in Europe and Japan.

Their cover version of "Sunday Morning" (originally by Velvet Underground) was released as an extra track on the 12" of "Since Yesterday". It was not included on any of the Strawberry Switchblade albums.

The track's opening fanfare comes from the third and final movement of Sibelius's Symphony No. 5.

=== Later records ===
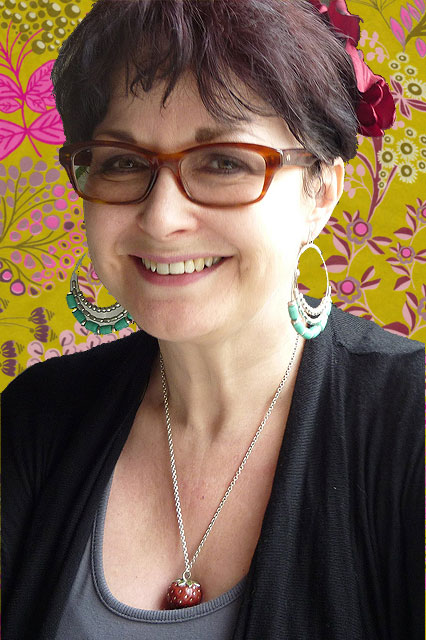
Bryson in 2012

In March 1985 they released their next single, "Let Her Go".

Following the release of their eponymous album in April, in May 1985 they released a further single, the ballad "Who Knows What Love Is", one of two tracks on the album produced by Phil Thornalley of The Cure.

Their fifth single, an electro-pop cover of Dolly Parton's "Jolene", was issued in September 1985 in the UK and Japan.

In 1985 they also provided vocals for an "alien funeral procession" in Rigel 9, a "space opera" project by David Bedford (music) and Ursula K. Le Guin (lyrics).

Although their commercial success had waned in the UK, they remained popular in Japan and two later singles, "Ecstasy (Apple of My Eye)" and "I Can Feel", were issued only in that country. The second of these featured just McDowall as by this time the partnership had drifted apart. By early 1986, the group had disbanded.

McDowall and Bryson appeared together in BBC Scotland’s "Since Yesterday: The Untold Story of Scotland's Girl Bands", first broadcast in December 2024.

=== Retrospectives ===
In December 2005 Warner Bros. Platinum Records released a career retrospective of the band, made up of 16 tracks from various recordings on one compact disc. It included one previously unreleased track, a demo version of "I Can Feel".

The band's earliest studio recordings, three songs recorded in 1982 when they were still a quartet, was released as a limited edition 7" EP in January 2017. The version of "Trees and Flowers" on the EP proved very popular on the social media app TikTok, and it has become the band's most popular track on music on Spotify.

=== Solo work ===
McDowall continued in music, playing with many neofolk bands. In 2018-2019, McDowall and Shawn Pinchbeck provided the soundtrack for the film Far From the Apple Tree.

In July 2013, after a break of almost 30 years from music, Bryson returned to songwriting in a new band called The Shapists, named after the fictitious art movement in the film The Rebel.

== Band members ==
Former members

- Rose McDowall – lead vocals, rhythm guitar (1981–1986)
- Jill Bryson – backing vocals, lead guitar (1981–1986)
- Janice Goodlett – bass (1981–1982)
- Carole McGowan – drums (1981–1982)

== Discography ==
Strawberry Switchblade discography
- Studio albums: 1
- Extended plays: 1
- Compilation albums: 2
- Singles: 10
- B-sides: 13
- Music videos: 4

The discography of Strawberry Switchblade consists of one studio album, two compilation albums, one extended play, seven singles, thirteen b-sides and four music videos.

=== Studio album ===
Year	Album details	Chart positions	
Year	Album details	UK	JP
1985	Strawberry Switchblade: Released: April 1985 (expanded edition released in Japan, 1997); Label: Korova / WEA	25	39

=== Compilation albums ===
Year	Album details
1985	The 12" Album: Released: 28 November 1985 (originally Japan only, issued on CD in Canada, 1995); Label: Warner-Pioneer Corporation
2005	The Platinum Collection: Released: 12 December 2005; Label: Warner Platinum

=== Extended plays ===
- 1982 4-Piece Demo (2017), Night School

=== Singles ===
Year	Title	Album	Chart positions				
Year	Title	Album	UK	UK Indie	IE	JP	NL
1983	"Trees and Flowers"	—	–	3	–	–	–
1984	"Since Yesterday" Promotional flexi-disc previewing the album	Strawberry Switchblade	5	–	6	–	24
1985	"Let Her Go"	Strawberry Switchblade	59	–	–	–	–
1985	"Who Knows What Love Is?"	Strawberry Switchblade	84	–	–	–	–
1985	"Ecstasy (Apple of My Eye)" (released in Japan only)	The 12" Album	–	–	–	71	–
1985	"Jolene"	—	53	–	–	90	–
1986	"Beautiful End" (released in the Philippines only) "I Can Feel" (released in Japan only)	—	–	–	–	–	–
2017	"1982 4-Piece demo"						
"–" denotes releases that did not chart or were not released in that territory.

=== B-sides ===
- "Go Away" (1983) (B-side of "Trees and Flowers")
- "Trees and Flowers (Just Music)" (1983) (B-side of "Trees and Flowers")
- "By the Sea" (1984) (B-side of "Since Yesterday")
- "Sunday Morning" (1984) (B-side of "Since Yesterday")
- "Beautiful End" (1985) (B-side of "Let Her Go")
- "Michael Who Walks by Night" (1985) (B-side of "Let Her Go")
- "Poor Hearts" (1985) (B-side of "Who Knows What Love Is?")
- "Let Her Go (Kitchensynch Mix-Up)" (1985) (B-side of "Who Knows What Love Is?")
- "Being Cold" (1985) (B-side of "Jolene" and "Ecstasy (Apple of My Eye)")
- "Black Taxi" (1985) (B-side of "Jolene")
- "Jolene (Extended Mix)" (1985) (B-side of "Jolene")
- "Since Yesterday (Extended Mix)" (1986) (B-side of "I Can Feel")

=== Music videos ===
Year	Title	Director
1984	"Since Yesterday"	Tim Pope
1985	"Let Her Go"	Tim Pope
1985	"Who Knows What Love Is?"	Tim Pope
1985	"Jolene"	
1985	"Michael Who Walks By Night" (unreleased)	

=== Compilation appearance ===
- "Dark 7" on Scared to Get Happy: A Story of Indie-Pop 1980–1989 (2013), Cherry Red
