= Crocodiles (band) =

American pop band

- Origin: San Diego, California, United States
- Genres: Noise pop, indie pop, post-punk revival, psychedelic rock, Lo-fi
- Years active: 2008–present
- Labels: Fat Possum, Frenchkiss Records, Souterrain Transmissions. Hell, Yes!, Zoo Music
- Members: Brandon Welchez (vocals, guitar), Charles Rowell (guitar), Atef Aouadhi (bass), Diego Dal Bon (drums)
- Past members: Marco Rapisarda, Alianna Kalaba, Anna Schulte, Robin Eisenberg, Marco Gonzalez, Jay Weilminster, David Joshua Claxton, Robert Moutrey

Crocodiles is a noise pop/indie pop band from San Diego, California, US. The group was formed in 2008 by core members Brandon Welchez and Charles Rowell after the break-up of their former punk bands Some Girls and The Plot to Blow Up the Eiffel Tower. Crocodiles' sound has typically been likened to The Jesus and Mary Chain, The Archies, and Tommy James & The Shondells.

== History ==
Whilst at the same time playing in an early incarnation of Dum Dum Girls (Welchez since divorced from frontwoman Dee Dee Penny, aka Kristin Kontrol), Crocodiles initially gained exposure in 2008 after fellow Southern California noise pop band No Age included their single "Neon Jesus" in a list of the year's best songs. This led to the duo being signed to Mississippi-based label Fat Possum Records, who released the band's self-recorded debut album Summer of Hate, in April 2009.

After touring in support of their debut full-length, the first half of 2010 saw Crocodiles go into a studio in the Mojave Desert with British producer James Ford. The resultant sessions comprise the band's second album Sleep Forever. The record was released by Fat Possum in the September of that year.

In September 2010, Crocodiles released an instrumental song, "Kill Joe Arpaio", referencing the controversial anti-immigrant Sheriff of Maricopa County, Arizona. Arpaio heard the song and responded using Twitter, "Msg for the San Diego band 'Alligators' who wrote a new song called 'Kill Joe Arpaio': BITE ME,". Arpaio also referenced the song during an appearance on Phoenix TV channel KPHO, saying "I'm a little concerned about the music, where kids can get this type of music. I think it sends a bad message. I understand freedom of speech, but there has to be a line of threatening a law enforcement official." Crocodiles responded via Spin Magazine saying "Maybe if the song was called 'I'm Gonna Kill Joe Arpaio,' he'd have a case but what we are attacking is the attitudes and policies he represents. In reality, we're keeping our fingers crossed that his much-deserved heart attack comes soon; the world can always use one less racist."

In September 2011, Charles Rowell and Brandon Welchez self-produced their third album, Endless Flowers in Berlin, Germany. The album was released in the spring of 2012. Guests on the album include reggae singer Hollie Cook and Dum Dum Girls Dee Dee, performing back ups on the track "My Surfing Lucifer" under the moniker Les Fleurs Du Mal Girl's Choir.

In April 2013, Charles Rowell and Brandon Welchez recorded their fourth album, Crimes Of Passion. The album was produced by Sune Rose Wagner of The Raveonettes in Los Angeles, California. Guests on the album include Gregg Foreman of Delta 72 and Cat Power, soul singer Afrodyete of Breakestra as well as Welchez' brother, jazz musician Josh Welchez.

In addition to their own recordings, Crocodiles have collaborated with Television Personalities' frontman Dan Treacy as well as Dum Dum Girls. Although initially gigging as a two-piece, Welchez and Rowell have expanded the band to include a live drummer, bassist and keyboard player. Musicians in the live band have included members of Blank Dogs, The Slits, A Place To Bury Strangers, Cat Power and Dum Dum Girls.

Outside of their activities with Crocodiles, Rowell has released music with Hollie Cook under the name Psychic Dancehall and under the name of Crush of Souls, while Welchez has released music with wife Dee Dee under the name Haunted Hearts. Both Rowell and Welchez have collaborated on poetry books with various friends, including late Cold Cave member Justin Benoit. Welchez and Dee Dee release records for other bands under the Zoo Music label name. In recent years Welchez has collaborated with Los Angeles based musician Kate Clover (whom he wed in 2022) and is a member of her band.

== Discography ==
=== Albums ===
- Summer of Hate (2009)
- Sleep Forever (2010)
- Endless Flowers (2012)
- Crimes of Passion (2013)
- Boys (2015)
- Dreamless (2016)
- Love Is Here (2019)
- Upside Down in Heaven (2023)
- Greetings From Hell (2026)

=== EP ===
- Fires of Comparison (2010)

=== Singles ===
- "Neon Jesus" (2008)
- "Refuse Angels" (split with Cold Cave) (2008)
- "Hollow Hollow Eyes" (split with Dum Dum Girls, Graffiti Island and PENS) (2009)
- "I Wanna Kill" (Fat Possum Record Store Day split with Wavves) (2009)
- "I Wanna Kill" (UK release) (2009)
- "Merry Xmas Baby (Please Don't Die)" (collaboration with Dum Dum Girls) (2009)
- "Sleep Forever" (2010)
- "Sunday (Psychic Conversation#9)" (2011)
- "Crybaby Demon" (2015)
- "Foolin' Around" (2015)
