= HoZac Records =

American record label

- Founded: 2006
- Founder: Todd Killings, Brett Cross
- Distributor: The Business
- Genre: underground rock 'n' roll
- Country of origin: United States
- Location: Chicago, Illinois
- Official website: hozacrecords.com

HoZac Records is a record label formed in Chicago, Illinois, United States in late 2006 by Todd Killings and Brett Cross after the demise of Horizontal Action Magazine (1997–2005). Concentrating on releasing records from musicians of the underground rock 'n' roll world, HoZac started off with 7" singles for the first two years and released their first LP by The Smith Westerns.
