= Kristin Kontrol =

American musician

- Kontrol in 2011

Background information
- Also known as: Dee Dee Penny
- Born: Kristin Gundred; 1982 (age 43–44); San Leandro, California, U.S.
- Origin: San Diego, California, United States
- Genres: Pop; rock; alternative
- Occupations: Singer; songwriter; musician
- Instruments: Vocals; guitar; drums
- Years active: 2005–present
- Label: Sub Pop
- Formerly of: Dum Dum Girls; Grand Ole Party
- Website: kristingundred.com

Kristin Gundred (born 1982), known professionally as Kristin Kontrol and formerly Dee Dee Penny, is an American musician, singer and songwriter. She began her career as the founder and lead singer of three-piece band Grand Ole Party from 2005 to 2008. Gundred found greater success with the all-female indie rock band Dum Dum Girls (2008–2015), with whom she released five studio albums between 2010 and 2014.

== Biography ==
Kristin Gundred was born in San Leandro, California. She attended the University of California Santa Cruz, where she studied literature and intended on becoming a writer. During her college years, she studied abroad in Germany.

=== 2005–2008: Career beginnings with Grand Ole Party ===
Performing in bands since around 2000, In 2005, Gundred formed the San Diego-based trio band Grand Ole Party, which consisted of Gundred as the band's frontwoman, vocalist and dummer, guitarist John Paul Labno, and bassist Mike Krechnyak, all of whom met while attending the University of California in Santa Cruz. In August 2007, Gundred joined indie rock band Rilo Kiley on their European tour to sing backup vocals. The following month, lead guitarist of Rilo Kiley Blake Sennett would produce Grand Ole Party's debut album Humanimals. Despite Grand Ole Party receiving critical acclaim by Spin magazine and the San Diego Music Awards, the group disbanded by September 2009.

=== 2008–2016: Dum Dum Girls and subsequent projects ===
In late 2008, Gundred began working on a solo project, however, after wanting to expand the project, Gundred co-formed the rock band Dum Dum Girls with friends Jules, Bambi, and Frankie Rose in October 2009. In working on their first project as a group, Gundred formed her own record label Zoo Music, which released the band's home-recorded CD. It was during this time she adapted the pseudonym Dee Dee Penny. Also in 2009, Gundred, along with Mike Sniper of Blank Dogs, formed the duo The Mayfair Set. They released an eponymous single followed by the Young One 12-inch EP, both in 2009. In 2011, by way of Richard Gottehrer, who had produced Dum Dum Girls' previous projects, Gundred collaborated with Sune Rose Wagner of The Raveonettes, whom she had been a longtime fan of since discovering the then-Danish band when she attended college in Germany.

Also in 2011, Gundred and Tamaryn released a cover of the Jesus and Mary Chain song "Teenage Lust" under the name Les Demoniaques. Also that year, Gundred, Mike Sniper and J.B. Townsend of Crystal Stilts recorded a one-sided 7-inch single, "Faraway Friend," under the name Zodiacs, which was given away via Captured Tracks mail order. In 2013, Gundred composed the opening theme for the animated series Beware the Batman. The same year, Gundred and then-husband, frontman of Crocodiles Brandon Welchez formed their duo, Haunted Hearts, releasing their single, "Something That Feels Bad Is Something That Feels Good", followed by the Initiation full-length in 2014.

In 2014, Dum Dum Girls would produce their fourth and final studio album, Too True, before Gundred announced the groups disbandment in 2016.

In early 2015, Gundred was featured on "Play for Today", a duet from Belle and Sebastian's 2015 album, Girls in Peacetime Want to Dance. The same year, she began working on new material. In May, she and collaborator UUV/Andrew Miller released a single, "Is There Any Other One?", as HUNI. In August, she was featured on Lemonade's single "Dancer on the Shore". In November, Sub Pop released a collaboration 7-inch single, "Red Sun" b/w "Echo", with the 4AD band Merchandise.

=== 2016–present: Solo work and X-Communicate ===
Gundred announced Kristin Kontrol as her new solo project on January 28, 2016. Her debut album, X-Communicate, was released on May 27, 2016, on Sub Pop Records. It was a departure from the sound she had explored with Dum Dum Girls, leaning towards synthpop. The album was met with favorable reviews.

In 2017, she and bandmate/producer Andrew Miller scored the Tim Hunter-directed film Looking Glass, starring Nicolas Cage. In 2018, she scored the Bret Easton Ellis-penned film Smiley Face Killers. On September 21, 2017, she released the digital single "Concrete Love".

Gundred is vegan and has collaborated with the cruelty-free cosmetics company Reverie.

Under the Dee Dee moniker, she formed a band called OCDPP with Cassie Ramone from Vivian Girls and OJ from Xray Eyeballs. Their first performance was in 2015, and they released an EP called 7" Long Player in 2020.

== Discography ==
=== Albums ===
Title	Album details	Peak chart positions			
Title	Album details	US Heat	US Indie	US Rock	US Vinyl
X-Communicate	Released: May 27, 2016; Label: Sub Pop; Formats: CD, LP, cassette, digital download	7	36	49	20

=== Singles ===
Title	Year	Album
"X-Communicate"	2016	X-Communicate
"Show Me"	2016	X-Communicate
"(Don't) Wannabe"	2016	X-Communicate
"Baby Are You In?"	2016	non-album
"Concrete Love"	2017	non-album
