= Mew discography =

- Studio albums: 7
- EPs: 3
- Live albums: 2
- Compilation albums: 1
- Singles: 17

The discography of Danish rock band Mew consists of seven studio albums, three extended plays, one compilation album, and two live albums.

== Albums ==
=== Studio albums ===
List of studio albums, with chart positions
Title	Album details	Peak chart positions									Certifications
Title	Album details	DEN	FIN	NOR	SWE	UK	US	US Heat.	US Taste	US Indie	Certifications
A Triumph for Man	Released: 2 April 1997; Label: Exlibris; Format: CD	8	—	—	—	—	—	—	—	—	
Half the World Is Watching Me	Released: 4 May 2000; Label: Evil Office; Format: CD	34	—	—	—	—	—	—	—	—	
Frengers	Released: 7 April 2003; Label: Evil Office, Epic; Format: LP, CD	2	36	6	—	102	—	—	—	—	IFPI DEN: Platinum
And the Glass Handed Kites	Released: 19 September 2005; Label: Evil Office; Format: CD, digital download	2	4	4	36	129	—	—	—	—	IFPI DEN: Platinum
No More Stories...	Released: 25 August 2009; Label: Columbia; Format: CD, LP, digital download	1	2	2	41	110	130	1	10	21	IFPI DEN: Gold
+ −	Released: 28 April 2015; Label: Play It Again Sam; Format: CD, LP, digital download	1	9	19	—	59	—	2	8	—	
Visuals	Released: 28 April 2017; Label: Play It Again Sam; Format: CD, LP, digital download	18	—	—	—	—	—	15	—	35	
"—" denotes a recording that did not chart or was not released in that territory.

=== Compilation albums ===
List of compilation albums, with chart positions
Title	Album details	Peak chart positions
Title	Album details	DEN
Eggs Are Funny	Released: 25 October 2010; Label: Sony	34

=== Live albums ===
Title	Album details	Notes
Live in Copenhagen	Released: 6 December 2006; Label: Evil Office; Formats: DVD	Recorded on 25 March 2006 at K.B. Hallen, Copenhagen.
Mew With Copenhagen Philharmonic	Released: 14 December 2018; Label: Evil Office	Recorded on 9 February 2017 at Konservatoriets Koncertsal, Copenhagen.

== Extended plays ==
List of extended plays, with chart positions
Title	EP details	Peak chart positions
Title	EP details	FIN
The Zookeeper's Boy EP	Released: 2006	—
Live Session (iTunes Exclusive)	Released: 11 September 2007; Label: Sony; Format: Digital download	—
No More Stories EP	Released: 28 June 2009; Label: Sony; Format: Digital download	2
"—" denotes a recording that did not chart or was not released in that territory.

== Singles ==
List of singles, with chart positions
Title	Year	Peak chart positions				Album
Title	Year	DEN	NOR	SWE	UK	Album
"I Should Have Been a Tsin-Tsi (For You)"	1997	—	—	—	—	A Triumph for Man
"She Came Home for Christmas"	1997	—	—	—	—	A Triumph for Man
"King Christian"	2000	—	—	—	—	Half the World Is Watching Me
"Her Voice Is Beyond Her Years"	2000	—	—	—	—	Half the World Is Watching Me
"Mica"	2000	—	—	—	—	Half the World Is Watching Me
"Am I Wry? No"	2002	—	16	—	47	Frengers
"Comforting Sounds"	2003	—	—	—	48	Frengers
"156"	2003	—	—	11	—	Frengers
"She Came Home for Christmas"	2003	—	—	—	55	Frengers
"Apocalypso"	2005	—	—	—	75	And the Glass Handed Kites
"Special"	2005	—	—	—	46	And the Glass Handed Kites
"Why Are You Looking Grave?"	2006	20	—	—	53	And the Glass Handed Kites
"The Zookeeper's Boy"	2006	—	13	—	80	And the Glass Handed Kites
"Introducing Palace Players"	2009	—	—	—	—	No More Stories...
"Repeaterbeater"	2009	—	—	—	—	No More Stories...
"Beach"	2010	—	—	—	—	No More Stories...
"Sometimes Life Isn't Easy"	2010	—	—	—	—	No More Stories...
"Making Friends (13)"	2013	—	—	—	—	Non-album single
"Satellites"	2015	—	—	—	—	+ -
"Water Slides"	2015	—	—	—	—	+ -
"Witness"	2015	—	—	—	—	+ -
"—" denotes a recording that did not chart or was not released in that territory.
