= + − (album) =

2015 studio album by Mew

Studio album by Mew
- Released: 21 April 2015
- Recorded: May 2013 – September 2014; Copenhagen, Denmark
- Genre: Alternative rock
- Length: 58:18
- Labels: Play It Again Sam; Evil Office; A:larm Music; Universal Music; Petroleum
- Producers: Michael Beinhorn; Mew

Mew chronology
No More Stories... (2009)	+ − (2015)	Visuals (2017)

Singles from + −
- 1. "Satellites" Released: 19 January 2015; 2. "Water Slides" Released: 16 March 2015

+ − (pronounced "plus minus") is the sixth studio album by Danish alternative rock band Mew. It was released on 21 April 2015. The album was promoted by the singles "Satellites" and "Water Slides". It was Mew's first studio album in five-and-a-half years, following their 2009 record No More Stories....

Bassist Johan Wohlert made his return on this album after being absent from the band's previous album following his departure in 2006. + − was also the final album to feature guitarist Bo Madsen, who left the band on 1 July 2015, as well as the final album to featured original formation.

== Recording and release ==
The recording process for + − started in May 2013 in Copenhagen. Mew enlisted the help of American producer Michael Beinhorn, with whom they worked on their fourth studio album, And the Glass Handed Kites (2005).

They also invited guitarist Russell Lissack of the British rock band Bloc Party, whom they first met years earlier during a joint US concert tour. Lissack was featured on the track "My Complications".

The release date for the album was announced on 19 January 2015 as 27 April 2015, simultaneously releasing "Satellites" as the first single. The album was issued as a CD, a heavyweight gatefold double 12" vinyl and a limited edition deluxe double CD book, as well as digitally, with iTunes Store pre-order starting in January.

In February 2015, "The Night Believer" was premiered on Norwegian radio station NRK P3. The song features guest vocals by New Zealand singer-songwriter Kimbra. The album's second single "Water Slides" was released in March 2015. In April 2015, Mew premiered the song "Witness".

== Critical reception ==
Professional ratings
Aggregate scores
Source	Rating
Metacritic	78/100
Review scores
Source	Rating
AllMusic	4/5 stars
Consequence of Sound	B
DIY	4/5 stars
Drowned in Sound	7/10
Exclaim!	8/10
The Line of Best Fit	7/10
musicOMH	4/5 stars
NME	7/10
Pitchfork	7.2/10
PopMatters	8/10 stars

Upon its release, the album received favourable reviews from music critics. At Metacritic, which assigns a normalized rating out of 100 to reviews from mainstream critics, the album received an average score of 78, based on 17 reviews.

Ian Cohen of Pitchfork commented that "+ − is liable to be one of the more magnificent-sounding rock records you'll hear all year."

== Commercial performance ==
The album debuted at number one in Denmark, becoming Mew's second number-one album. In the United Kingdom, + − debuted at number 59 on the UK Albums Chart with first-week sales of 1,438 copies. It is the band's highest-charting album since Frengers (2003) charted at number 102.

== Track listing ==
All tracks are written by Jonas Bjerre, Bo Madsen, Johan Wohlert, and Silas Utke Graae Jørgensen.

+ − track listing
No.	Title	Length
1.	"Satellites"	6:09
2.	"Witness"	3:01
3.	"The Night Believer"	4:12
4.	"Making Friends"	4:52
5.	"Clinging to a Bad Dream"	6:43
6.	"My Complications"	6:03
7.	"Water Slides"	5:04
8.	"Interview the Girls"	4:04
9.	"Rows"	10:42
10.	"Cross the River on Your Own"	7:28
Total length:		58:18

Bonus tracks on Japanese release
No.	Title	Length
11.	"Drinking Soda"	5:02
12.	"Western Silver Lion Cub"	4:02

Deluxe edition CD exclusive disc: Live in Copenhagen 2014
No.	Title	Length
1.	"Coffee Break"	4:05
2.	"Satellites"	5:56
3.	"She Spider"	4:46
4.	"Hawaii"	5:35
5.	"My Complications"	5:42
6.	"Silas the Magic Car"	4:03
7.	"Water Slides"	4:45
8.	"Cross the River on Your Own"	7:32
9.	"Special"	3:09
10.	"The Zookeeper's Boy"	5:27
Total length:		51:45

== Personnel ==
Mew

- Jonas Bjerre – vocals, guitars, piano, synthesizers
- Bo Madsen – guitars
- Johan Wohlert – bass guitar, guitars
- Silas Utke Graae Jørgensen – drums, percussion

=== Additional musicians ===
- Kimbra – vocals on track 3, backing vocals on track 7, 8
- Russell Lissack – guitar on track 6
- Sasha Ryabina – backing vocals on track 1, 2, 5, 10
- Nick Watts – keyboards

=== Technical ===
- Michael Beinhorn – production
- Rich Costey – mixing
- Christian Alex Petersen – mixing, engineer

== Charts ==
Weekly chart performance for + −
Chart (2015)	Peak position
Danish Albums (Hitlisten)	1
Finnish Albums (Suomen virallinen lista)	9
Norwegian Albums (VG-lista)	19
Scottish Albums (Official Charts)	44
UK Albums (Official Charts)	59
UK Independent Albums (Official Charts)	10
US Heatseekers Albums (Billboard)	2
US Top Alternative Albums (Billboard)	18
US Top Rock Albums (Billboard)	25
US Indie Store Album Sales (Billboard)	8
US Vinyl Albums (Billboard)	21

== Release history ==
Region	Date	Format	Label
Denmark	21 April 2015	LP, CD, digital download	Evil Office, A:larm Music, Universal Music
Belgium	24 April 2015	LP, CD, digital download	Play It Again Sam
Germany	24 April 2015	LP, CD, digital download	Play It Again Sam
Netherlands	24 April 2015	LP, CD, digital download	Play It Again Sam
Norway	27 April 2015	LP, CD, digital download	Petroleum Records
Poland	27 April 2015	LP, CD, digital download	Play It Again Sam
United Kingdom	27 April 2015	LP, CD, digital download	Play It Again Sam
United States	28 April 2015	LP, CD, digital download	Play It Again Sam
