= Matters of the Heart (2024 film) =

2024 film by Christina Rosendahl

- Poster
- Danish: Fuld af kærlighed
- Directed by: Christina Rosendahl
- Written by: Christina Rosendahl
- Produced by: Jonas Frederiksen
- Starring: Stine Stengade; Lars Ranthe; Viilbjørk Malling Agger
- Cinematography: Louise McLaughlin
- Edited by: Olivier Bugge Coutté; Mark Bukdahl
- Music by: Jonas Struck
- Production company: Nimbus Film
- Release date: 23 May 2024 (Denmark)
- Running time: 110 minutes
- Country: Denmark
- Language: Danish

Matters of the Heart (Danish: Fuld af kærlighed) is a 2024 Danish drama film written and directed by Christina Rosendahl. The film stars Stine Stengade, Lars Ranthe, and Viilbjørk Malling Agger.

It was theatrically released in Denmark on 23 May 2024. It won seven awards at the 42nd Robert Awards, including Best Danish Film.

== Premise ==
A middle-class family is affected by the father's alcoholism, which has led to disruption in their lives.

== Cast ==
- Lars Ranthe as Peter
- Stine Stengade as Helen
- Viilbjørk Malling Agger as Sofia
- Ella Paaske as Jenni
- Luca Uhde Jacobsen as Gustav
- Viktor Hjelmsø as Nelson
- Janus Nabil Bakrawi as Martin
- Malaika Berenth Mosendane as Louise
- Hanne Hedelund as Nina

== Production ==
Matters of the Heart was inspired by Rosendahl's childhood experiences, including her father's struggle with alcoholism. In 2022, the project received a production grant from the Danish Film Institute under the working title Maskerade.

== Release ==
Matters of the Heart was theatrically released in Denmark on 23 May 2024. The film's gala premiere was originally scheduled to take place at the Imperial Theater, Copenhagen, but was relocated due to sound degradation policies implemented at the venue.

== Accolades ==
Award / Film Festival	Date of ceremony	Category	Recipient(s)	Result	Ref.
Robert Awards	1 February 2025	Best Danish Film	Jonas Frederiksen and Christina Rosendahl	Won	
Robert Awards	1 February 2025	Best Director	Christina Rosendahl	Won	
Robert Awards	1 February 2025	Best Actor in a Leading Role	Lars Ranthe	Won	
Robert Awards	1 February 2025	Best Actress in a Leading Role	Viilbjørk Malling Agger	Won	
Robert Awards	1 February 2025	Best Actress in a Supporting Role	Stine Stengade	Won	
Robert Awards	1 February 2025	Best Original Screenplay	Christina Rosendahl	Won	
Robert Awards	1 February 2025	Best Cinematography	Louise McLaughlin	Won	
Robert Awards	1 February 2025	Best Production Design	Rie Lykke	Nominated	
Robert Awards	1 February 2025	Best Costume Design	Juan Bastias	Nominated	
Robert Awards	1 February 2025	Best Editing	Mark Bukdahl and Olivier Bugge Coutté	Nominated	
Robert Awards	1 February 2025	Best Sound Design	Peter Albrechtsen	Nominated	
Robert Awards	1 February 2025	Best Score	Jonas Struck	Nominated	
Robert Awards	1 February 2025	Best Song	Emil Jørgensen, Jonas Struck, Pernille Rosendahl, and Teitur Lassen for "Matters of the Heart"	Nominated	
Bodil Awards	15 March 2025	Best Danish Film	Christina Rosendahl	Nominated	
Bodil Awards	15 March 2025	Best Lead Performance	Viilbjørk Malling Agger	Nominated	
Bodil Awards	15 March 2025	Best Supporting Performance	Lars Ranthe	Won	
Bodil Awards	15 March 2025	Best Supporting Performance	Stine Stengade	Nominated	
Bodil Awards	15 March 2025	Best Ensemble	Lars Ranthe, Stine Stengade, Viilbjørk Malling Agger, Ella Paaske, and Luca Uhde Jacobsen	Won	
Bodil Awards	15 March 2025	Best Screenplay	Christina Rosendahl	Nominated	
