= The Storm (Danish band) =

Danish rock band

- Origin: Denmark
- Genres: Pop; rock
- Years active: 2006–2014 (on hiatus)
- Labels: Universal (2008, 2011–2014); Target (2009)
- Members: Johan Wohlert; Pernille Rosendahl
- Website: www.thestorm.dk

The Storm is a former Danish rock band formed in 2006 by Pernille Rosendahl (former lead singer of Swan Lee) and Johan Wohlert (former bassist of Mew) which are to date the only permanent members of the band.

== Career ==
=== 2006–09: Where the Storm Meets the Ground ===
Ex-couple Pernille Rosendahl and Johan Wohlert formed the Storm in 2006 after they had a child together and had left their previous musical groups, Swan Lee and Mew respectively. In December 2006, they signed a contract with Universal Music in Denmark.

The band's first official public appearance was on 11 January 2008 when they performed live at P3 Guld as the final act. The band released "Drops in the Ocean" as their debut single. They appeared with Rosendahl as the vocalist, Wohlert and Mads Wegner on guitar, Michel Swan as the drummer, Jakob Millung as the bassist and the keyboardist. Their debut studio album followed up entitled Where the Storm Meets the Ground and was released on 11 February 2008. The album was produced by famous producer Roy Thomas Baker, who among other things has worked with Queen, The Cars and Danish band Gasolin'. Richard Fortus from Guns N' Roses also contributed on the album. The album was not well received among the Danish reviewers, and the Storm was later accused of using material from other artists. However, the album became a commercial success with 25,000 copies sold and the band scored gold record for it.

=== 2009–10: Black Luck ===
The band returned to the studio in 2009 to record their second studio album. Black Luck was produced by Jacob Hansen who Pernille got introduced to through Volbeat after she sang a duet with Michael Poulsen on the song "Mary Ann's Place". About the album, Pernille reportedly said: "It's like coming home after a long journey to have total control again. We're back to our roots and bring back our fingerprints on everything". Black Luck was released on 12 October 2009 by the group's own company WR Production in collaboration with Target Records. The album sold 1,150 copies in the first week and debuted at number seven on the album chart. The album spent four weeks on the top 40 and by March 2010 it had sold 10,000 copies according to the record company. In August 2010, the band signed an international contract with Finnish record label Spinefarm Records. On 27 October 2010, Black Luck was released in the United Kingdom, Germany, Switzerland, Austria and Finland through Spinefarm.

=== 2011–present: Rebel Against Yourself ===
On 7 March 2011, the band released "Lost in the Fire" as the preceding single for their third studio album, Rebel Against Yourself. The single became the band's biggest hit to date with a peak position at number three on the charts and a platinum record for more than 30,000 digits sold. Rebel Against Yourself was released on 29 August 2011 and among the album's inspirations are artists such as ABBA, Dire Straits and Pet Shop Boys. Compared to the duo's previous albums, they have moved away from the heavy rock sound to a more Nordic pop sound. The Storm has collaborated with the Swedish rock band Kent on two of the album's tracks, including the second single of the album "My Crown". Rebel Against Yourself went in at number five on the album chart with sales of 955 copies in the first week. The album spent just four weeks on the chart.

In October 2013, it was announced that Pernille Rosendahl and Johan Wohlert had been divorced. They said, however, that they will continue to make music together.

== Members ==
Since the formation of the band in 2006, the band consisted of two permanent members: Pernille Rosendahl, the vocalist of the band and Johan Wohlert, the guitarist of the band. There have been various supporting members throughout the band's history.

=== Johan Wohlert ===
Johan Wohlert (born 10 March 1976) is the bass player of Danish indie band Mew. He previously left the band on 11 April 2006, because he did not feel that he could be a rock star and a good father at the same time. He is married to Pernille Rosendahl, vocalist of the now-dissolved band Swan Lee, who is also the mother of his child, Tristan, who was born in May 2006. He is the guitarist of the band.

=== Pernille Rosendahl ===
Pernille Rosendahl (born 22 March 1972) is a Danish singer, who besides her solo career was lead singer of the Danish band Swan Lee. She started music at an early age. In 1985, she formed a reggae band with drummer Emil Jørgensen, named Rocka. She also sang in a choir between 1991 and 1994. In 1995, she recorded an album in London with producer Tim Simenon, but it was never released. In 1996 she formed a band with her boyfriend Tim Christensen, her Rocka band partner Emil Jørgensen, and guitarist Jonas Struck. Christensen left the band in 1999. She is the vocalist of the band.

== Discography ==
=== Album ===
Year	Title	Peak position	Certifications
Year	Title	DAN	Certifications
2008	Where the Storm Meets the Ground	2	Gold
2009	Black Luck	7	
2011	Rebel Against Yourself	5	

=== Singles ===
Year	Single	Peak position	Certifications	Album
Year	Single	DAN	Certifications	Album
2008	"Drops in the Ocean"	5	Gold	Where the Storm Meets the Ground
2008	"Lullaby"	20		Where the Storm Meets the Ground
2009	"Honesty"	—		Black Luck
2009	"Are Your Shoes Too Tight?"	—		Black Luck
2010	"Pass for a Lonely Person"	—		Black Luck
2011	"Lost in the Fire"	3	Platinum	Rebel Against Yourself
2011	"My Crown"	—		Rebel Against Yourself
2012	"Raver"	—		Non-album singles
2013	"Broken Bones"	15		Non-album singles
"—" denotes items which were not released in that country or failed to chart.

=== Featured on ===
- Alexander Brown – "Mind Distorted" (featuring the Storm)
