= Visuals (album) =

Studio album by Mew
- Released: 28 April 2017
- Recorded: 2016
- Genres: Alternative rock; pop
- Length: 43:46
- Label: Play It Again Sam
- Producer: Mew

Mew chronology
+ − (2015)	Visuals (2017)

Singles from Visuals
- 1. "85 Videos" Released: 16 February 2017; 2. "Twist Quest" Released: 3 April 2017; 3. "In a Better Place" Released: 11 May 2017

Visuals is the seventh and final studio album by Danish alternative rock band Mew. It was released on 28 April 2017. It is the first Mew album not to feature guitarist Bo Madsen, who left the band after their previous album, + − (2015), and their first album since No More Stories... (2009) to be recorded as a trio.

== Recording and release ==
The album was written while on tour for + − (2015). It was recorded and self-produced in Copenhagen with the band designing the visuals for it.

On 24 January 2017, Mew announced the album via their official website, while a song from the album, "Carry Me to Safety", was premiered on Danish radio station P6 Beat.

First single "85 Videos" was released together with a music video on 16 February 2017. On 3 April 2017, the second single "Twist Quest" was shared. Music videos for both singles were directed by Jonas Bjerre.

== Critical reception ==
Professional ratings
Aggregate scores
Source	Rating
Metacritic	74/100
Review scores
Source	Rating
AllMusic	3.5/5 stars
DIY	3/5 stars
Drowned in Sound	7/10
Exclaim!	6/10
Pitchfork	6.2/10
PopMatters	8/10 stars

Upon its release, the album received favourable reviews from music critics. At Metacritic, which assigns a normalized rating out of 100 to reviews from mainstream critics, the album received an average score of 74, based on 9 reviews.

Dave Beech, writing for DIY, described it as "a confident release from a seasoned band still harbouring the energies of youth".

== Track listing ==
All tracks are written by Jonas Bjerre, Johan Wohlert, and Silas Utke Graae Jørgensen.

Visuals track listing
No.	Title	Length
1.	"Nothingness and No Regrets"	4:28
2.	"The Wake of Your Life"	4:42
3.	"Candy Pieces All Smeared Out"	3:36
4.	"In a Better Place"	4:40
5.	"Ay Ay Ay"	3:40
6.	"Learn Our Crystals"	5:20
7.	"Twist Quest"	3:20
8.	"Shoulders"	2:52
9.	"85 Videos"	4:36
10.	"Zanzibar"	2:04
11.	"Carry Me to Safety"	4:28
Total length:		43:46

Bonus tracks on Japanese release
No.	Title	Length
12.	"Seeker Shivers"	2:40
13.	"Heavenly Jewel Thief"	4:16

== Personnel ==
Mew

- Jonas Bjerre – vocals, keyboards, guitar
- Johan Wohlert – bass, backing vocals, guitar
- Silas Utke Graae Jørgensen – drums, percussion

Additional personnel

- Mads Wegner – additional guitar
- Marius Neset – saxophone
- Bo Rande – trumpet, flugelhorn
- Sasha Ryabina – backing vocals

== Charts ==
Chart performance for Visuals
Chart (2017)	Peak position
Belgian Albums (Ultratop Flanders)	193
Danish Albums (Hitlisten)	18
US Heatseekers Albums (Billboard)	15
US Independent Albums (Billboard)	35
US Top Rock Albums (Billboard)	47

== Release history ==
Region	Date	Format	Label
Japan	21 April 2017	CD, digital download	Play It Again Sam
Various	28 April 2017	LP, CD, digital download	Play It Again Sam
