= Karoline Leth =

Danish television producer and filmproducer

- Born: May 12, 1964 (age 62)
- Citizenship: Denmark
- Occupation: Film producer
- Children: Emma Leth, Aksel Leth
- Parents: Jørgen Leth (father); Wivi Leth (mother)

Karoline Leth (born May 12, 1964) is a Danish film and TV series producer.

She is the mother of Emma Leth and Aksel Leth, sister of Kristian Leth and daughter of Jørgen Leth.

== Career ==
Karoline Leth served as a teacher and coordinator in the documentary program at the National Film School of Denmark from 1999 to 2004. Subsequently, she assumed the roles of CEO and producer at Zentropa Real, Zentropa's documentary division. Later, she took on the position of director and producer at SF Studios from 2006 to 2013. Between 2013 and 2018, Leth worked as a producer at DR Drama. Following a brief stint at Apple Tree Productions, she returned to Zentropa in 2019 as the Head of Drama Series.

Karoline Leth has produced over 20 short and documentary films, as well as several feature films, one notable example being The Passion of Marie (2012), directed by the Oscar-winning Bille August. Additionally, she served as a co-producer for the feature film series Arn: The Knight Templar (2007) and Arn – The Kingdom at Road's End (2008). In 2010, these films were adapted into a six-episode drama series for DR and TV4.

She produced the first two seasons of the dramady series Rita (2012 - 2013) for TV 2 (Denmark). The series was created by Christian Torpe, and has subsequently been a great success on Netflix. Remakes of it have also been made in several European countries.

Leth developed together with main writer Dunja Gry Jensen the groundbreaking character-driven crime series Norskov (2015).

She was a producer on The Legacy, season 1 (the last two episodes) as well as all of seasons 2 and 3 (2014-2017). The series was created by Maya Ilsøe. The Legacy have received the Danish Film Academy's Robert awards for best drama series as well as for best lead and supporting roles in all three seasons, and have also received the French FIPA award for best script for the first season

Karoline Leth has produced the mini-drama series Liberty (2018), based on the award-winning and late author Jakob Ejersbo's novel of the same name. The series was created by Asger Leth and directed by Mikael Marcimain and was selected for the Berlinale's Drama Series Days 2018, where it had its world premiere

Leth produced the TV series The Dreamer - Becoming Karen Bixen (2021) for Viaplay Group, which had its world premiere at Canneseries 2022. The series is based on an idea by Karoline Leth and Connie Nielsen.

Karoline Leth has also produced the second season of the crime series DNA (2022) for TV2 Denmark, with Anders W. Berthelsen, Olivia Joof Lewerissa and Charlotte Rampling in the main roles.

== Filmography ==
TV series

- DNA (2022)
- The Dreamer - Becoming Karen Bixen (2022)
- Liberty (2018)
- The Legacy (2014–2017)
- Norskov (2015-2017)
- Rita (2012–2013)
- Arn (2010 miniseries)

Movies

- The Canary and Dinë (2014 short)
- Baby (2014 short)
- Lulu (2014 short)
- I'm talking to you - John Kørner's world (2013 documentary)
- Where the light comes in (2013)
- The Passion of Marie (2012)
- Wild Bird (2012 short)
- 10 Hours to Paradise (2012)
- The Curse (2012)
- Zomedy (2011 short)
- Lost In Africa (2010)
- Fierce Ladies (2010 documentary)
- The Devilles (2009 documentary)
- Next Time We'll Be Birds (2009 short)
- Independent Lens (2009) (co-producer)
- Defamation (2009)
- A Creepy Greeting (2008 short)
- Arn - The Kingdom at Road's End (2008) (co-producer)
- Danish Dynamite (2008 documentary)
- Arn - The Knight Templar (2007) (co-producer)
- The Ring (2006 short)
- Guerrilla Girl (2005)
- Con Ella (2004 short)
- Une Femme (2004 short)
- American short (2004 short)
- Raw Youth (2004 documentary)
- Get a life (2004 documentary)
- Growing Up In A Day (2002 short)
- Notes on Silence (2001 short)
