= She Came Home for Christmas =

Single by Mew

from the album A Triumph for Man
- Released: 1997
- Genre: Pop; rock
- Length: 3:54
- Label: Exlibris Musik
- Songwriter: Mew

Mew singles chronology
"I Should Have Been a Tsin-Tsi (For You)" (1997)	"She Came Home for Christmas" (1997)	"Her Voice Is Beyond Her Years" (2000)

"She Came Home for Christmas" is the second single by Danish alternative rock band Mew. The song was released after "I Should Have Been a Tsin-Tsi (For You)". The song originally appeared on the band's debut album A Triumph for Man in 1997, and was later included on Frengers, a compilation album of sorts, in 2003. The song was released as a single in both Denmark and the United Kingdom multiple times between 1997 and 2003.

== Music video ==
The video was filmed in 2002. In the beginning we see the scene, and "good" fairy, which appeared on it. Then appears a man in a suit of a bear, which starts dancing with the fairy. In the middle of the video there is "evil" fairy with the magic ball in her hand, with help of which she kills the bear. After that, the scene starts to grow with plants, and the "evil" fairy turns into a tree. All this time the events on the stage are combined with the playing of the group, which plays on the background of the falling snow. At the end the video shows a girl with a teddy-bear, which she has received for Christmas.

== Track listing ==
=== Danish CD Single (1997)[EXLCDM 008] ===
1. "She Came Home for Christmas (new version)"
2. "Snowflake (Gloria Hirsh remix)"
3. "Wheels over Me (Alleder Und Fa remix)"
4. "She Came Home for Christmas (Toneklang mix)"

=== Danish CD Single (2002)[EVLCDS7] ===
1. "She Came Home for Christmas"

=== UK CD Single (2002) ===
1. "She Came Home for Christmas"

=== UK CD Single (2003) ===
1. "She Came Home for Christmas"
2. "That Time on the Ledge"

=== UK DVD Single (2003) ===
1. "She Came Home for Christmas" (Video)
2. "Mew Documentary"
3. "That Time on the Ledge" (Audio)
4. "Frengers Game" (Interactive)

=== Japanese CD EP (2003) ===
1. "She Came Home for Christmas"
2. "King Christian" (New Version)
3. "Mica" (New Version)
4. "Watch This Space"
5. "She Came Home for Christmas" (Acoustic)
6. "She Came Home for Christmas" (Video)

== Charts ==
Chart (2002–03)	Peak position
UK Singles (Official Charts)	55
