= Jonas Bjerre =

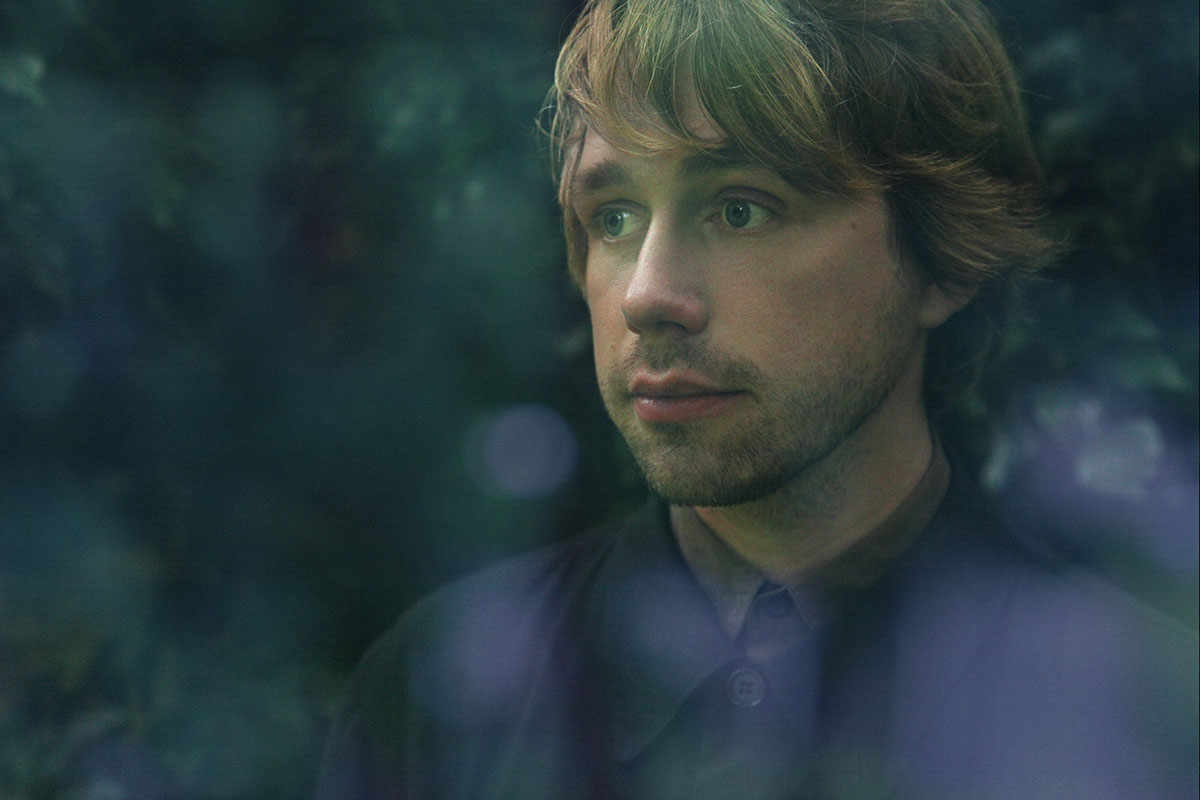
- Jonas Bjerre in 2012

Background information
- Born: 21 September 1976 (age 49); Frederiksberg, Copenhagen, Denmark
- Genres: Alternative rock; experimental rock; indie rock
- Occupations: Musician; singer; visual artist; composer
- Instruments: Vocals, Guitar
- Years active: 1994–2026

Jonas Bjerre Terkelsbøl (born 21 September 1976) is a Danish musician and visual artist from Copenhagen, best known as the lead singer of the alternative rock band Mew. Bjerre creates animated videos for Mew's live shows. He has an uncommon vocal range, above the average pitch, which has helped contribute to Mew's unique sound, and earned him a Danish Music Award for Danish Male Singer in 2006.

He went to school at the international school of Bernadotteskolen and was a student of Aurehøj Amtsgymnasium. In addition to his work with Mew, Bjerre is also a part of the band Apparatjik and has directed music videos for other artists, including A-ha and Agnes Obel.

== Career ==
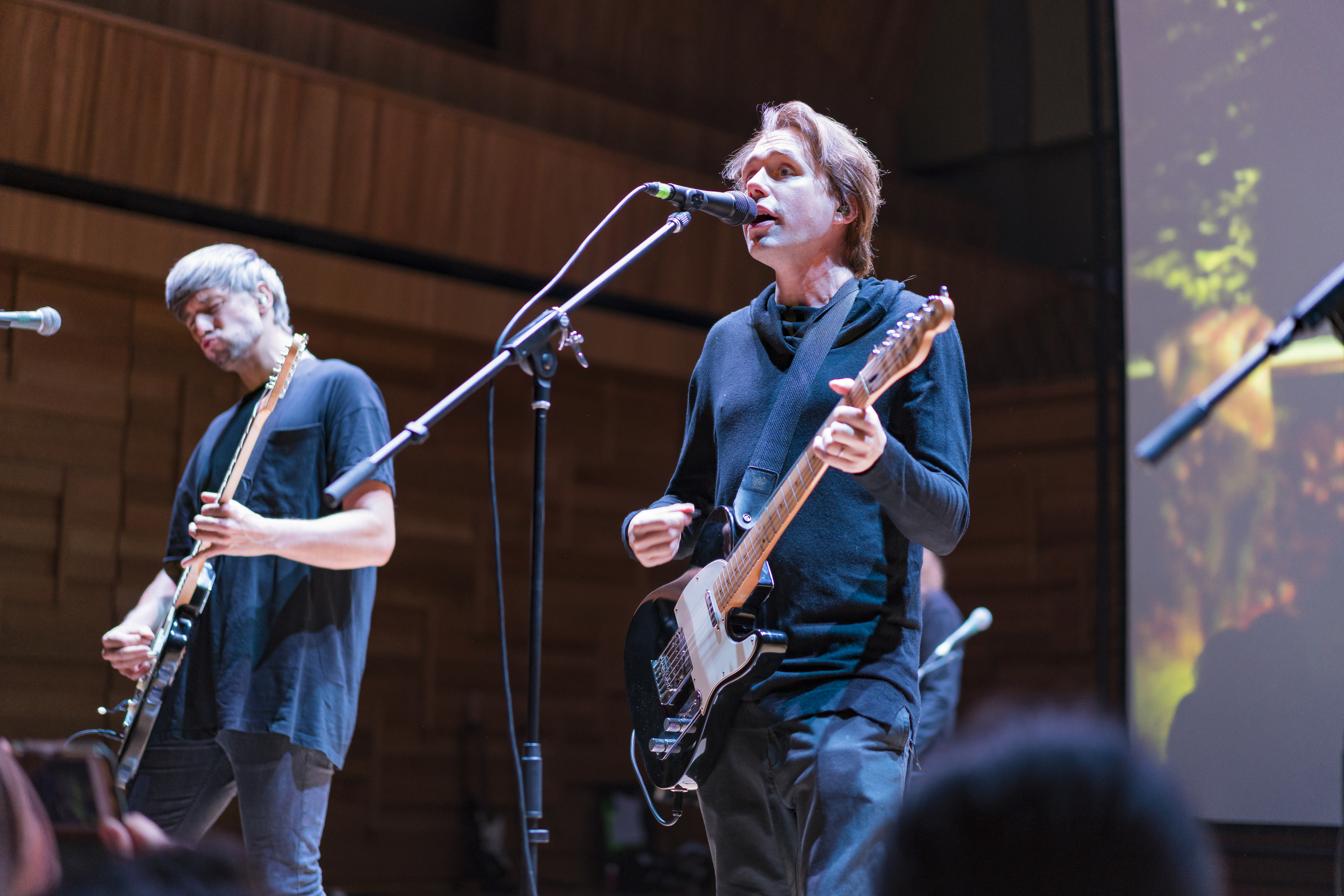
Performing with Mew in Singapore in 2017

Bjerre is also in a band called Apparatjik consisting of himself, Guy Berryman of Coldplay, Magne Furuholmen of A-ha and Martin Terefe. Apparatjik was originally formed to write and record a song for a charity album called Songs for Survival linked with the BBC Documentary called Amazon with Bruce Parry. Their contribution to the album became the main theme for the television series. Since then, Apparatjik have expanded into the field of art, exhibiting visual arts and performing inside a glass cube at various galleries and art festivals. In 2010 they released the album We Are Here via their official website, and later, in June 2010, through iTunes.

Outside of band commitments, Bjerre has also recorded songs and written scores for films and television. In 2011, Bjerre composed the soundtrack for the movie Skyscraper by Rune Schjøtt. The music was released on the album Songs and Music from the Movie Skyscraper. In 2020 Jonas composed and recorded the music for the TV series Scandinavian Star and released the score as a soundtrack album. In 2021, Bjerre wrote and recorded music for the documentary film President about the 2018 presidential election in Zimbabwe, directed by Camilla Nielsson.

In 2021 Jonas Bjerre announced a new collaboration with musician and producer Tobias Wilner called Tachys. They released their first single When The World Wakes Up in June 2021. The released their eponymous debut album in July 2022. Bjerre has also appeared as a featured vocalist on songs by artists such as Duran Duran, Kimbra, Purity Ring, Blue Foundation, Silo, Molina, Future 3, RAC, Carly Paradis, and Kasper Winding.

== Albums ==
=== With Mew ===
Year	Album details	Peak chart positions							Certifications
Year	Album details	DEN	FIN	NOR	SWE	UK	JP	US	Certifications
1997	A Triumph for Man: Released: 1997, 2006 (reissue); Label: Exlibris Musik	8	—	—	—	—	—	—	
2000	Half the World Is Watching Me: Released: 2000, 2007 (reissue); Label: Evil Office, Playground	34	—	—	—	—	—	—	
2003	Frengers: Released: April 2003, 2007 (reissue); Label: Sony BMG, Epic	2	36	6	—	102	77	—	DEN: Platinum
2005	And the Glass Handed Kites: Released: 19 September 2005; Label: Evil Office, Sony BMG	2	4	4	36	129	32	—	DEN: Platinum
2009	No More Stories... (Note: The name in its entirety is: No More Stories / Are Told Today / I'm Sorry / They Washed Away // No More Stories / The World Is Grey / I'm Tired / Let's Wash Away.): Released: 19 August 2009; Label: Evil Office, A:larm Music	1	2	2	41	110	42	130	DEN: Gold
2015	+ -: Released: 24 April 2015; Label: Evil Office, A:larm, Universal	1	9	—	—	59	—	—	
2017	Visuals: Released: 28 April 2017; Label: PIAS Recordings	18	—	—	—	—	—	—	
"—" denotes releases that did not chart.

=== With Apparatjik ===
Year	Album details	Peak chart positions							
Year	Album details	UK	NOR	IRL	ITA	NED	SWI	FRA	US
2010	We Are Here: Released: 1 February 2010 CD/DVD released: 7 June 2010 Re-released: 15 June 2010; Label: Meta Merge Un Recordings	—	—	—	—	—	—	—	—
2012	Square Peg in a Round Hole: Initial Release: 11 November 2011; Physical Release: 19 March 2012; Label: Meta Merge Un Recordings	—	—	—	—	—	—	—	—
2012	If You Can, Solve This Jumble (with Lowell): Physical Release: 29 October 2012; Label: Meta Merge Un Recordings	—	—	—	—	—	—	—	—

=== With Tachys ===
Year	Album details	Peak chart positions	
Year	Album details	UK	DEN
2022	Tachys: Released: 13 May 2022	—	—

=== As Jonas Bjerre, film and tv composer ===
- Pandasyndromet (Panda Syndrome) (2004)
- Game Over (2005)
- Vi Der Blev Tilbage (We Who Stayed Behind) (2008)
- Girl in the Water (2011)
- Bosporus (2011)
- Skyscraper – Skyskraber (2011)
- Scandinavian Star (2020)
- President (2021)
- The Hostage Takers (2023)
- Brennpunkt: Skyggekrigen (Shadow War) (2023)

=== Other appearances ===
Year	Album	Artist	Credit(s)
2012	In My Mind I Am Free	Blue Foundation	Vocals and music on "Fundamental". Vocals on "Ground Control".
2012	In My Mind I Am Free Reconstructed	Blue Foundation	Remix of "Dressed in Black".
2014	Work	Silo	Vocals on "O"
2014	The Golden Echo (Deluxe Version)	Kimbra	Vocals on "The Magic Hour"
2015	Paper Gods	Duran Duran	Vocals and guitar on "Change the Skyline"
2016	Blood Moon	Blue Foundation	Vocals on "Lost Girl"
2019	Nothing Is Something	Carly Paradis	Vocals on "The Crushing Weight of History"
2020	Womb	Purity Ring	Vocals on "Peacefall"
2021	You	RAC	Vocals on "Feel You"
2021	Cold	Molina	Vocals and cello on "Cold"
