= Christina Rosendahl =

Danish film director (born 1971)

- Born: 5 January 1971 (age 54); Nykøbing Falster, Region Zealand, Denmark
- Occupation: Film director
- Years active: 2002–present
- Notable work: Supervoksen (2007); The Idealist (2015); The Good Traitor (2020)
- Relatives: Pernille Rosendahl (sister)
- Awards: Robert Award for Best Children's Film (2007); Bodil Special Award (2017)

Christina Rosendahl (born 5 January 1971) is a Danish film director. A nominee for several Robert Awards, she is known for her work on the films Supervoksen (2007), The Idealist (2015), and The Good Traitor (2020).

== Biography ==
Christina Rosendahl was born on 5 January 1971 in Nykøbing Falster, a city in Region Zealand. She was educated at the University of Copenhagen, where she was a student in Comparative Literary History and Film and Media Studies; European Film College (1995-1996), where she befriended Peter Albrechtsen (who would later become a sound designer and a long-time creative partner); New York Film Academy; and Super16, a non-traditional film school in Valby.

In 2002, Rosendahl graduated from Super16 and directed her first film Stargazer, a documentary on her sister Pernille Rosendahl and her band Swan Lee. In 2003, she directed Buddhas barn, a documentary about Pia Rasmussen, the half-Danish reincarnation of Tibetan Buddhist teacher Khunu Lama Tenzin Gyaltsen. In 2006, she directed her first feature film, Supervoksen; the film was about a character whom AfterEllen called "the first lesbian teen in Danish film history". In 2007, she won the Robert Award for Best Children's Film at the 24th Robert Awards for Supervoksen.

In 2015, she was the director of The Idealist, a thriller film about an investigation into health issues concerning workers in the 1968 Thule Air Base B-52 crash cleanup effort; she was nominated for the Robert Award for Best Director (at the 33rd Robert Awards) and the Bodil Award for Best Danish Film (at the 69th Bodil Awards) for that film. In 2020, she directed and co-wrote The Good Traitor, a period drama about the ambassador Henrik Kauffmann; she was nominated for the Robert Award for Best Director (at the 38th Robert Awards) and the Bodil Award for Best Danish Film (at the 74th Bodil Awards) for that film.

She was chairperson of the Danish Film Directors Association from 2014 until her resignation in 2022. As chairperson, she promoted female representation within the film director occupation. She won the 2017 Bodil Special Award for her work as chairperson. Rosendahl joined the European Film College's board in 2020.

Her 2024 film Matters of the Heart was inspired by her childhood experiences and her father's struggle with alcoholism. It won the Best Danish Film and six other awards at the 42nd Robert Awards.

== Filmography ==
Year	Title	Director	Writer	Notes
2002	Stjernekigger	Yes	—	
2006	Triple Dare	Yes	No	
2015	The Idealist	Yes	Yes	
2017	Violently in Love	Yes	—	
2020	The Good Traitor	Yes	Yes	
2024	Matters of the Heart	Yes	Yes	

== Awards and nominations ==
Year	Title	Award	Result	Ref.
2007	Supervoksen	Robert Award for Best Children's Film	Won	
2016	The Idealist	Robert Award for Best Danish Film	Nominated	
2016	The Idealist	Robert Award for Best Director	Nominated	
2016	The Idealist	Bodil Award for Best Danish Film	Nominated	
2017	N/A	Bodil Special Award	Won	
2021	The Good Traitor	Robert Award for Best Danish Film	Nominated	
2021	The Good Traitor	Robert Award for Best Director	Nominated	
2021	The Good Traitor	Bodil Award for Best Danish Film	Nominated	
