= No More Stories... =

Studio album by Mew
- Released: 17 August 2009
- Recorded: 2008
- Studios: Brooklyn Recording and Electric Lady Studios, New York City, and Evil Office, Copenhagen, Denmark
- Genres: Alternative rock, indie rock, dream pop
- Length: 53:36
- Labels: Evil Office, Columbia
- Producers: Rich Costey, Mew

Mew chronology
And the Glass Handed Kites (2005)	No More Stories... (2009)	+ − (2015)

Singles from No More Stories...
- 1. "Introducing Palace Players" Released: 28 May 2009; 2. "Repeaterbeater" Released: 25 June 2009; 3. "Beach" Released: April 2010; 4. "Sometimes Life Isn't Easy" Released: 3 May 2010

No More Stories... (Note: Full title: No More Stories Are Told Today, I'm Sorry They Washed Away // No More Stories, The World Is Grey, I'm Tired, Let's Wash Away.) is the fifth studio album by the Danish alternative rock band Mew. It was released in Scandinavia on 17 August, the United Kingdom on 24 August, the United States on 25 August, and Japan on 26 August 2009.

Released on Columbia Records and produced by Rich Costey, who also did their breakthrough record Frengers, it is the band's first album as a trio after bassist Johan Wohlert left in 2006 to spend time with his family. As Wohlert rejoined Mew in 2014, it is the band's only album to not feature him.

The album became Mew's first to reach number one in Denmark. It was also their first (and only) album to chart in the United States, at number 130.

== Background ==
According to lead vocalist Jonas Bjerre, this album is happier, "dancier", and more upbeat than its predecessor, And the Glass Handed Kites, which had a dark theme of fear.

"Introducing Palace Players", the first single off No More Stories... was first released on their MySpace page on 28 May 2009. It features Swirlies vocalist/guitarist Damon Tutunjian on bass guitar. Other than its inclusion as the lead-off track on the No More Stories EP, it has not been released as a physical single.

The opening track, "New Terrain", if played backwards reveals another song entitled "Nervous" which is added as a bonus track to the vinyl edition of the album. The lyrics were posted as a poem on their Danish record company Evil Office's website.

== Album title ==
The full title of the album is No More Stories Are Told Today, I'm Sorry They Washed Away // No More Stories, The World Is Grey, I'm Tired, Let's Wash Away. Bjerre explained the unusually long title of the album to Gaffa: "We originally wanted a short title for the album but we couldn't find sufficiently redemptive words. The final title is the lyrics to the short intermezzo 'Hawaii Dream', and when Bo [Madsen] suggested that we used the complete text as a title it didn't take him long to convince Silas [Utke Graae Jørgensen] and myself. It was like finding the missing piece in a puzzle".

== Critical reception ==
Professional ratings
Review scores
Source	Rating
AllMusic	4/5 stars
The A.V. Club	(A)
BBC	(positive)
Drowned in Sound	8/10
Gaffa	6/6 stars
Gigwise	8/10 stars
NME	4/5 stars
Paste	8/10
Pitchfork Media	8.1/10

No More Stories... was met with universal acclaim upon release. The album was extremely well received in the band's native Denmark upon release, getting top scores in reviews from most music magazines, including Gaffa and Soundvenue. Website Metacritic calculated an average score of 79 out of 100 from 17 professional reviews. The A.V. Club gave it an A (the highest note), praising that "Mew really does inhabit a place where few contemporaries can be found." The independent review site Pitchfork Media gave the album an 8.1/10, citing that "Mew has succeeded in developing a good sound from some of the least hip ingredients imaginable", while comparing the album to progressive rock bands of the late 1970s. British music weekly NME gave the album 8/10, going on to say that, "Always inventive, often beautiful and occasionally totally sublime, Mew have always stood out from the pack." Slant Magazine gave the album 3 out of 5 stars, stating that "Mew is not as thoughtful or smart as they think they are, but the force of their conviction is inspiring."

== Track listing ==
All tracks are written by Mew.

No More Stories... track listing
No.	Title	Length
1.	"New Terrain"	3:14
2.	"Introducing Palace Players"	4:46
3.	"Beach"	2:46
4.	"Repeaterbeater"	2:33
5.	"Intermezzo 1"	0:29
6.	"Silas the Magic Car"	4:06
7.	"Cartoons and Macramé Wounds"	7:21
8.	"Hawaii Dream"	1:47
9.	"Hawaii"	5:01
10.	"Vaccine"	5:08
11.	"Tricks of the Trade"	4:28
12.	"Intermezzo 2"	1:03
13.	"Sometimes Life Isn't Easy"	5:21
14.	"Reprise"	5:32
Total length:		53:36

12" vinyl bonus track
No.	Title	Length
15.	"Nervous"	3:14

== Personnel ==
Mew

- Jonas Bjerre – vocals, guitars, piano, synthesizers
- Bo Madsen – guitars
- Silas Utke Graae Jørgensen – drums, percussion

Additional musicians

- Bastian Juel – bass on all songs except "New Terrain", "Introducing Palace Players" and "Tricks of the Trade"
- Damon Tutunjian – bass on track 2
- Dr. Nick Watts – additional keyboards on "Introducing Palace Players", "Beach", "Cartoons and Macramé Wounds" and "Reprise"
- Nico Muhly – string, piano and piccolo/flute arrangements on track 11
- Mathias Friis-Hansen – additional percussion on "New Terrain", Kalimba on "Hawaii" and "Vaccine", and marimba on "Vaccine"
- Steve Coleman – alto saxophone on track 13
- Mari Helgerlikova – additional vocals on track 13
- Sellasi Dewornu – additional African percussion on track 9
- Choir on tracks "Introducing Palace Players" and "Cartoons and Macramé Wounds"
  - Anne Christine Berggren
  - Anni Mogensen
  - Nanna Secker Larsch
  - Lianna Quarshie
- Children's choir on "Silas the Magic Car" and "Sometimes Life Isn't Easy"
  - Mia-Marie Olesen
  - Maria Bruun
  - Fannie Klint
  - Solveig Honore
  - Mathilde Lerentzen
  - Emily Piercy
  - Roselil Hansen
  - Fritjof Nørretranders
  - Sally Risell
  - Vera Kwederis

Technical

- Rich Costey - record producer, mixing
- Bob Ludwig - mastering on tracks 2, 6, 7, 14
- Vlado Meller - mastering
- Charlie Stavish - engineering, mixing
- Mark Santangelo - recording assistant
- Noah Goldstein and Ben Liscio - mixing

== Charts ==
=== Weekly charts ===
Weekly chart performance for No More Stories...
Chart (2009)	Peak position
Danish Albums (Hitlisten)	1
Finnish Albums (Suomen virallinen lista)	2
Mexican Albums (Top 100 Mexico)	64
Norwegian Albums (VG-lista)	2
Swedish Albums (Sverigetopplistan)	41
UK Albums (OCC)	110
US Billboard 200	130
US Heatseekers Albums (Billboard)	1
US Independent Albums (Billboard)	21
