= Guerrilla Girl (2005 film) =

- Directed by: Frank Piasechi Poulsen
- Written by: Frank Piasechi Poulsen
- Produced by: Karoline Leth
- Release date: 2005
- Running time: 92 minutes
- Language: Spanish

Guerrilla Girl is a documentary film directed by Frank Piasechi Poulsen. It tells the story of a young girl named Isabel, who enters the Revolutionary Armed Forces of Colombia, the largest Marxist–Leninist revolutionary guerrilla organization in South America.
