= The Idealist =

- Directed by: Christina Rosendahl
- Written by: Lars Andersen; Christina Rosendahl; Simon Pasternak; Birgitte Stærmose
- Produced by: Jonas Frederiksen; Signe Leick Jensen; Ane Mandrup
- Starring: Peter Plaugborg; Søren Malling
- Cinematography: Laust Trier
- Edited by: Peter Albrechtsen
- Production companies: Toolbox Film; Beofilm Post Production; QX
- Distributed by: SFD
- Release date: 19 March 2015
- Running time: 114 minutes
- Country: Denmark
- Languages: Danish, English

The Idealist (Danish: Idealisten) is a 2015 Danish thriller film directed by Christina Rosendahl about the investigation into medical problems of workers who cleaned up after the 1968 Thule Air Base B-52 crash.

== Cast ==
- Peter Plaugborg — Poul Brink
- Søren Malling — Marius Schmidt
- Thomas Bo Larsen — Carl Dinesen
- Arly Jover — Estibaliz
- Jens Albinus — Blicher
- Nikolaj Cederholm — Pontoppidan - doctor
- Henrik Birch — Ole Damgaard
