= No More Stories (EP) =

No More Stories EP

EP by Mew
- Released: 28 June 2009
- Label: Sony

Mew EP chronology
| Live Session EP (2007) | No More Stories EP (2009) |

Professional ratings
Review scores
| Source | Rating |
|---|---|
| Gaffa | 4/6 stars |

No More Stories EP is an EP by Danish alternative rock band Mew, released on 28 June 2009. It contains two tracks from the subsequent studio album No More Stories... released barely two months later, plus three previously unreleased B-sides.

== Track listing ==
| No. | Title | Length |
|---|---|---|
| 1. | "Introducing Palace Players" | 4:46 |
| 2. | "Repeaterbeater" | 2:33 |
| 3. | "Owl" (B-side) | 1:18 |
| 4. | "Start" (B-side) | 2:00 |
| 5. | "Swimmer's Chant" (B-side) | 3:25 |
