= Half the World Is Watching Me =

Studio album by Mew
- Released: 4 May 2000
- Recorded: February–August 1999
- Genres: Alternative rock, indie pop
- Length: 43:39
- Label: Evil Office
- Producer: Mew

Mew chronology
A Triumph for Man (1997)	Half the World Is Watching Me (2000)	Frengers (2003)

Singles from Half the World Is Watching Me
- 1. "King Christian" Released: February 2000; 2. "Her Voice Is Beyond Her Years" Released: June 2000; 3. "Mica" Released: January 2001

Professional ratings
Review scores
Source	Rating
Gaffa	link

Half the World Is Watching Me is the second album by Danish alternative rock band Mew, released on their own record label Evil Office in 2000. The album was originally printed in about only 5,000 copies, but has been reissued twice for wider distribution. The reissued version released 4 September 2007 includes a nine-track bonus disc. The original release and the 2007 reissue include a hidden track, "Ending". The final 11 seconds of "Ending" are in fact the first 11 seconds at the start of "Am I Wry? No" before the drums kick in.

== Track listing ==
=== Original release ===
0. "Ending" – 2:01
1. "Am I Wry? No" – 4:53
2. "Mica" – 2:58
3. "Saliva" – 4:08
4. "King Christian" – 4:24
5. "Her Voice Is Beyond Her Years" – 4:24
6. "156" – 4:46
7. "Symmetry" – 5:18
8. "Comforting Sounds" – 8:44

To find the hidden track "Ending", which is identified by the purple circle at the center of the disc, start the opening track "Am I Wry? No" and rewind past 0:00.

=== Bonus tracks on first reissue ===
9. "She Came Home for Christmas" – 4:01
10. "I Should Have Been a Tsin-Tsi (For You)" – 2:01

This version did not include the hidden track "Ending", but added 2 bonus tracks (which are versions unique to this record). It is identifiable by a slightly different cover where the text has a white border, and an expanded booklet with full-page photographs of the band members. The disc is reflective, not totally white like the original release.

=== 2007 reissue bonus disc ===
1. "Half the World Is Watching Me" (studio outtake) – 3:04
2. "Her Voice Is Beyond Her Years" (live) – 3:18
3. "Mica" (live) – 3:42
4. "Wheels Over Me" (live) – 2:42
5. "Wherever" (live) – 5:31
6. "156" (Cubase demo) – 5:22
7. "Quietly" (demo) – 3:29
8. "Comforting Sounds (Do I Look Puerto Rican?)" (demo) – 7:48

== Personnel ==
=== Mew ===
- Jonas Bjerre - electric guitars, acoustic guitars, piano, synthesizers
- Bo Madsen - electric guitars, acoustic guitars
- Johan Wohlert - bass, guitars
- Silas Utke Graae Jørgensen - drums, percussion, tympani, drum machine

=== Additional personnel ===
- Tim Christensen - Mellotron
- Klaus Nielson - synthesizers (tracks 1, 4, 6, 7)
- Mads Hyhne and Kasper Tranberg - horns
- Flemming Rasmussen and Morten Sidenius - co-producer
- Flemming Rasmussen - engineer, mixer
- Jan Eliasson and Morten Bue - mastering engineer
