= Supervoksen =

- DVD Cover
- Directed by: Christina Rosendahl
- Written by: Mette Heeno
- Produced by: Thomas Heinesen
- Starring: Emma Leth; Cathrine Bjørn; Amalie Lindegård
- Music by: Vagn Luv
- Release date: 2006
- Country: Denmark
- Language: Danish

Supervoksen (English: Triple Dare) is a Danish comedy-drama from 2006. It is the first feature film from director Christina Rosendahl.

== Plot ==
Rebekka Claudia and Sofie are 15 years old and in high school. In class, they learn how different cultures mark the transition from childhood to adulthood. Deciding that confirmation is meaningless, they decide to create their own rite of passage, which involves choosing at random a dare from a cootie catcher. Attempting to perform their dares leads each girl towards maturity. Claudia learns she deserves respect in her romantic relationships, Sofie begins to accept her attraction to women, and Rebekka realises she is not the adult she assumed herself to be.

== Cast ==
- Emma Leth .... Rebekka
- Cathrine Bjørn .... Sofie
- Amalie Lindegård .... Claudia
- Nikolaj Coster-Waldau ....Martin
