= Pernille Rosendahl =

Danish singer (born 1972)

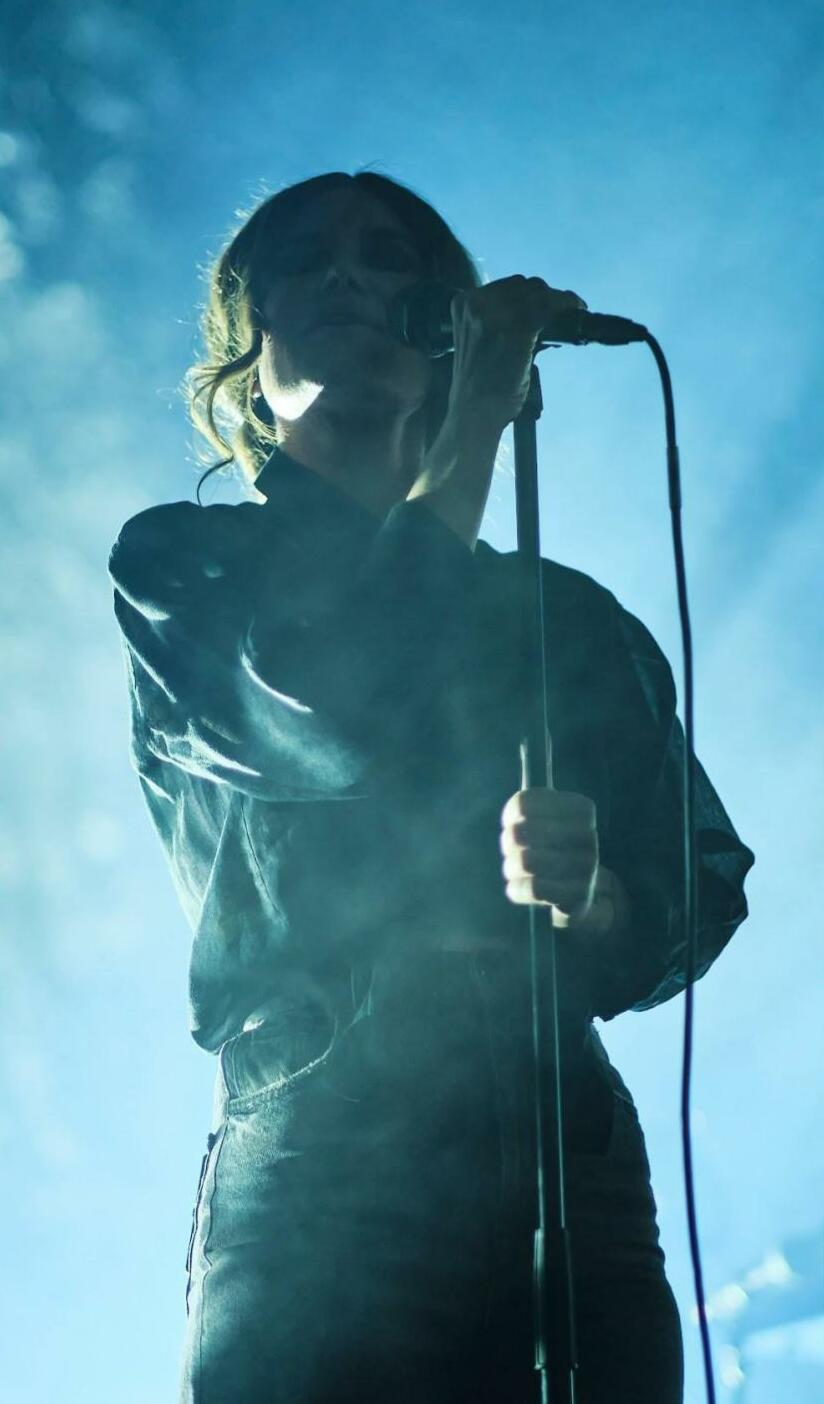
Rosendahl in 2023

Pernille Rosendahl (born 22 March 1972, in Aalborg) is a Danish singer, songwriter, and producer known as a solo artist, the lead singer of the indie rock band Swan Lee, and the rock band The Storm. Since she was 19, Pernille Rosendahl has had an active career, initially as a backing vocalist and since 1997 as a self-releasing solo artist. In 2005, she was named 'Singer of the Year' at the Danish Music Awards and has composed music for films and theater, becoming a prominent voice in Danish cultural debates. Over three decades, she has been one of Denmark's most prominent female singers.

== Music career ==
Pernille Rosendahl was born and raised in Aalborg, moving to Nykøbing Falster in 1982. She joined the reggae band Rockae in 1985 with drummer Emil Jørgensen. In 1989, she moved to Copenhagen and started at the Sangakademiet in 1990. Here, she met Billie Koppel, who introduced her to Annisette and Thomas Koppel, leading her to become a backing vocalist in the band Savage Rose. From 1991 to 1994, she toured with Savage Rose and contributed to the recording of the album 'Månebarn' in 1992. During this time, she also provided backing vocals for Zapp Zapp, Majbritte Ulrikkeholm, and Grabowski. In 1995, she went to London where she was offered several record deals as a solo artist but declined to pursue her own path.

=== Swan Lee ===
In 1996, Pernille Rosendahl, guitarist Jonas Struck, and drummer Emil Jørgensen recorded the EP 'Dream Away' under Pernille Rosendahl's name. After its release, they performed a showcase in New York during CMJ Music Week with Richard Fortus and Frank Ferrer from Guns N' Roses. In 1999, Pernille Rosendahl, Jonas Struck, and Emil Jørgensen formed and named the band Swan Lee after a song by Syd Barret. The band struggled to secure a record deal, a journey documented in the award-winning film documentary 'Stjernekigger' in 2002 by director Christina Rosendahl.

Swan Lee released three albums on their label GoGo Records: 'Enter' (2001), 'Swan Lee' (2004), and 'The Garden' (2023). They received DR's P3 Prize in 2002 and were nominated six times for the Danish Music Awards. In 2004, Pernille Rosendahl received the 'Singer of the Year' award at the Zulu Awards, and in 2005, she received the 'Danish Singer of the Year' award at the Danish Music Awards. Swan Lee disbanded in 2005 but reunited in 2023.

=== The Storm ===
In late summer 2007, Pernille Rosendahl and Johan Wohlert formed the rock band The Storm and signed with Universal Music in Denmark. In 2008, they released their debut album 'Where the Storm Meets the Ground,' produced by Roy Thomas Baker. The album sold over 25,000 copies and received a gold record. In 2010, they released the album 'Black Luck' produced by Jacob Hansen, selling 1150 copies. In 2011, they released their third album 'Rebel Against Yourself,' featuring the single "Lost in The Fire," one of the most played songs on Danish radio that year.

In 2013, they announced to the press that they had parted ways but intended to continue making music together.

=== Solo career ===
On 1 April 2016, she released her first solo album, 'Dark Bird,' on her label Dark Bird Inc., self-financed and written and produced by Pernille Rosendahl and Søren Vestergaard. Jonas H. Petersen co-wrote two songs. The album was mixed by Jeff Ellis and recorded in Copenhagen and Los Angeles. The album drew inspiration from the Højskolesangbogen, hymns by composer Carl Nielsen, the Nordic music library, Christopher Nolan's film 'Interstellar,' and Hans Zimmer's sound design. Inspired by a 2002 interview with David Bowie, the album also addressed the importance of embracing both the sad and positive aspects of everyday life. In an interview with Julie Moestrup, she said, "He said that the saddest thing about the Western world is that modern people don't dare to embrace both the dark and the light in their everyday lives. For him, life was about accepting all the sadness and melancholy, because it's also connected to all the wonderful and fun things." Berlingske wrote, "After a period away from the limelight, on her melancholic solo debut, 'Dark Bird,' a much more personal Pernille Rosendahl emerges, revealing a fragile musical character. How beautifully it suits her to cut to the most sensitive core." Gaffa wrote, "The melodies are completely straightforward and slightly cool in their subdued compositions, built on a delicious R&B and a trippy electronic vibe."

In 2019, she released the album 'The Hurt,' also written and produced by Pernille Rosendahl and Søren Vestergaard. The album was a personal and musical narrative about loneliness and a childhood marked by violence and abandonment. Gaffa wrote, "Vulnerability is fully played out in the lightly dark, but always oxygenating songs. They are minimally drawn melodies that find expression through unadorned bass lines and accelerating synth pads."

Pernille Rosendahl's two solo albums were inspired by hymns from the Højskolesangbogen and the sense of community that music provides. To offer the audience a more intimate experience of her music, she toured in churches and museums, including Christians Kirke, Hover Kirke, Dronninglund Kirke, Ansgars Kirke, Vestervang Kirke, Gråsten Slotskirke, Skagen Kirke, Trekroner Kirke, Brandkjærkirken, Sct. Michaelis Kirke, Præstevang Kirke, Treenighedskirken, Sct. Pauls Kirke, Virklund Kirke, Holstebro Kirke, Hinnerup Kulturhus, Kirke Hylling, Arken Museum for Modern Art, Rudolf Tegners Museum, HEART Herning, Faaborg Museum, Kunsten Museum of Modern Art Aalborg, Thorvaldsens Museum, Johannes Larsen Museet, Charlottenborg Kunsthal, and Kutuaq in Nuuk. Regarding the collaboration with cultural institutions, she told KBH Museer, "For me, concerts should ideally be a 360-degree experience of the physical space, art, and music. It challenges the usual expectations that the audience has for a concert."

== Culture and activism ==
=== Activism ===
Pernille Rosendahl has participated in debates on gender equality, #metoo, musicians', women's and children's rights, as well as the importance of the role of art. She has also been active in the discussion about musicians' rights and the issues surrounding streaming services. In 2016, she took part in the debate on the future of music at the Folkemødet on Bornholm and co-wrote a chronicle with Anna Lidell, the chairwoman of KODA, about the unbalanced remuneration distribution in the music industry. In 2022, she toured with the Danish Entertainment Orchestra and co-wrote a debate piece with director Andreas Vetø about promoting diverse cultural experiences in Denmark.

To celebrate International Women's Day, Pernille Rosendahl participated in the 2014 concert organized by Kvinfo at Den Sorte Diamant. As part of the Golden Days 2022 festival with the theme 'Queens', she created a sensual wandering concert with Rungstedlund, honoring the author Karen Blixen in their bird sanctuary.

=== Choir singing and Højskolesangbogen (The High School Songbook) ===
Pernille Rosendahl has mentioned several times that choir singing has been significant for her. In 2016, she co-founded the choir KORAGE with singers Sharin Foo, Hannah Schneider, Karen Mukupa, Josephine Philip, Rebekka Maria, Kristina Holgersen, and Louise Alenius Boserup.

In 2018, Pernille Rosendahl was invited by DR's Girls Choir conductor Philip Faber to interpret a series of hymns from Højskolesangbogen for the series 'Din Danske Sang' (Your Danish Song), broadcast from DR Koncerthuset. She interpreted, among others, 'Sig nærmer tiden, da jeg må væk' (The time approaches when I must leave), 'Se Nu Stiger Solen' (Now the sun is rising), and 'Drømte mig en drøm i nat' (Dreamt me a dream last night). She stated, "I see it as an honor to interpret these songs, which tell the story of the people who have lived in our country. I, of course, had awe and respect for the material because the songs are so well-written, but they also deserve contemporary interpretations so they continue to play their significant role in our sense of community as a country."

=== Film music ===
In 2004, her song "Someday" for the film Rembrandt was nominated for a Robert Award. In 2006, she re-recorded D-A-D's song "Laugh 'n' a Half" for Christina Rosendahl's film Supervoksen (Almost Perfect). She also appeared as a receptionist in the movie. In 2011, Pernille Rosendahl, Kristian Leth, and Fridolin Nordsø were nominated for a Robert Award for 'Song of the Year' with "Secret Life", which they had composed for the film Lost in Africa. She also voiced Smurfette in the Smurfs movies from 2011 and 2013.

=== TV ===
In 2003, she did a cover of Touch me by Weeping Willows on the danish/swedish show Stereo se/dk

From 2010 to 2012, Pernille Rosendahl was a judge on the talent show X Factor on DR1. She was a judge for a total of three seasons. In 2010, she mentored soloists over 25, leading Thomas Ring to victory in the final on 27 March 2010, at Parken Stadium. She was also involved in writing the winning song "My Dream", which became Ring's first single. In 2012, she similarly led Ida Østergaard Madsen to victory in Boxen, Herning.

In 2018, she participated in the TV2 program Toppen af Poppen (Top of the Pops) with Søren Sko, Lis Sørensen, Silas Bjerregaard, Thøger Dixgaard, Claus Hempler, and Annika Aakjær.

In 2019, she participated in the cultural series Åndernes huse i Norden (Houses of Spirits in the Nordics), where host Barbara Læssøe Stephensen visits various artists' homes in the Nordic region with some of our times' significant Nordic cultural personalities.

In 2021, she took part in the DR program Skattejagt på Museet (Treasure Hunt at the Museum) with author Knud Romer and director Mads Holst for Moesgaard Museum.

In 2022, she participated in DR2's documentary series DR2’s Store Danske Rock Historie (DR2's Great Danish Rock History) about the history of Danish rock music, where she was interviewed by D-A-D’s Jacob Binzer.

== Theater ==
In 2012, she participated in Nikolaj Cederholm's 'Hey Jude' theater concert about The Beatles at Østre Gasværk with Cecilie Stenspil, Troels Lyby, Jimmy Jørgensen, and Mark Linn. In conjunction with Aarhus being the European Capital of Culture in 2017, she took part in the dance theater concert 'Elsker Dig Forevigt' (Love You Forever) with the Black Box Dance Company Holstebro and choreographer Marie Brolin-Tani. The piece was based on Susanne Bier's film of the same name. Pernille Rosendahl and Søren Vestergaard created the music, which also included songs from her debut album, Dark Bird.

In 2021, they collaborated again to create the hybrid dance theater concert 'Vita Danica' at Aarhus Teater with the Black Box Dance Company Holstebro, director Sargun Oshana, architect and scenographer Sarah Fredelund, and designer Mark Kenly Domino Tan. The piece celebrated the Danish national spirit through contemporary dance and music, incorporating more than 20 songs from the Psalms and the High School Songbook. Børsen wrote, "An eye-opener into our common national heritage," interpreted through bodies, music, and images. Yet, it is also very moral, reminding us that we should never forget or belittle who we are or the cultural heritage we are shaped by. This is what 'Vita Danica' can and will do: "Make us stand by who we are, for better or worse."

== Private life ==
Pernille Rosendahl is married to former minister Kristian Jensen.

In connection with the launch of Christina Rosendahl's documentary "Vold i Kærlighedens Navn" (Violence in the Name of Love), which documents women's stories about violence from the crisis center Danner, the sisters described how they grew up with violence and fear. When she was 10 years old, she moved with her sister, younger brother, and mother to Nykøbing Falster because they had to go into hiding due to their abusive father. In 2004, Pernille Rosendahl talked about being abandoned at the age of three in a hotel room in the series 'Sange fra 1. sal' (Songs from the First Floor), where she subsequently sang Paul McCartney's song 'Waterfalls.'

On the occasion of Pernille Rosendahl's 50th birthday, Politiken published an article by journalist Erik Jensen that was criticized for being sexist, including in a chronicle by her sister Christina Rosendahl. Editor-in-chief Christian Jensen and journalist Erik Jensen subsequently apologized for the reference to Pernille Rosendahl.

== Discography ==
as Pernille Rosendahl

- Dream Away EP (1997)
- Dark Bird (2016)
- The Hurt (2019)

with Swan Lee

- Enter (2001)
- Swan Lee (2004)
- ‘Din Gamle Blå Frakke’, På Danske Læber (2004)
- The Garden (2023)

with The Storm

- Where the Storm Meets the Ground (2008)
- Black Luck (2009)
- Rebel Against Yourself (2011)

Guest Appearances

- ‘Vega 22-10-96’, Sharing Patrol (1996)
- ‘Gaderne Hvisker’, Frithjof Toksvig (1997)
- ‘Hide Your Ways’, Puddu Varano (2001)
- ‘Get on Land’, Düreforsøg (2002)
- ‘You & I’, Filur (2002)
- ‘Hempler’, Claus Hempler (2004)
- ‘Waterfalls’, Sange Fra 1. Sal (2004)
- ‘Mary Ann's Place’, Volbeat (2008)
- ‘På Vej Væk’, (Vi Ses) Kesi (2012)
- ‘Din Danske Sang’, DR Pigekoret (2018)
- ‘Grænseland - Sig Månen Langsomt Hæver’, Phillip Faber - DR Pigekoret - Pernille Rosendahl (2021)
- ‘Sovehoved’, Kristian Leth (2022)

Choir

- ‘Det Største Af Alt Er Kærlighed’ og ‘Lille Grønne Abe’ Savage Rose (1991)
- ‘Månebarm’, Savage Rose (1992)
- ‘Majbritte Ulrikkeholm’, Majbritte Ulrikkeholm (1993)
- ‘Take Me To The Moon’, Gone Fishin’ (1994)
- ‘Kingdom Come’, Lars Muhl (1994)
- ‘Underligere End Kærlighed’, Grabowski (1997)

Soundtracks

- ‘Someday’, Rembrandt (2003)
- ‘Laugh’n’ a Half’, Supervoksen (2006)
- ‘Secret Life’, Kidnappet (2011)
