= Frengers =

Studio album by Mew
- Released: 7 April 2003
- Recorded: September 2001–November 2002
- Studio: Sweet Silence Studios (Copenhagen); Sun Studio (Copenhagen); Ridge Farm Studios (Capel, Surrey); Third Stone Recording (Los Angeles); Cello Studios (Los Angeles)
- Genre: Alternative rock
- Length: 48:43
- Label: Sony
- Producer: Rich Costey

Mew chronology
Half the World Is Watching Me (2000)	Frengers (2003)	And the Glass Handed Kites (2005)

Singles from Frengers
- 1. "Comforting Sounds" Released: 24 March 2003; 2. "Am I Wry? No" Released: 16 June 2003; 3. "156" Released: July 2003 (Europe only); 4. "She Came Home for Christmas" / "That Time on the Ledge" Released: 15 December 2003

Professional ratings
Review scores
Source	Rating
AllMusic	4.5/5 stars
BBC	8/10
Drowned in Sound	8/10
Gaffa	6/6 stars
PopMatters	favorable
Sputnikmusic	5/5
Stylus Magazine	B+
Uncut	8/10

Frengers, alternatively titled as Frengers: Not Quite Friends, But Not Quite Strangers, is the third studio album by Danish alternative rock band Mew. It was released on 7 April 2003. The title is a portmanteau of the words "friend" and "stranger". A frenger is a person who is "not quite a friend but not quite a stranger" according to the album's accompanying booklet.

== Background ==
Six of the album's ten tracks were previously included on Mew's first two albums A Triumph for Man and Half the World Is Watching Me, both of which saw only limited release, but were rerecorded for Frengers. The other four are original recordings.

The song "Her Voice Is Beyond Her Years" features vocals from Swedish singer Stina Nordenstam. The vocals for "Symmetry" were recorded by a 13-year-old American named Becky Jarrett, who came in contact with the band online two years earlier. Bjerre was in search of a vocal with a "childlike" quality, so her mother sent the band recordings, but the quality was so poor that the band decided to fly them to Copenhagen to record in the studio. "156" features backing vocals by Damon Tutunjian of the American band Swirlies.

The Japanese version of Frengers also includes the re-recordings of two more earlier songs, "I Should Have Been a Tsin-Tsi (For You)" and "Wherever".

== Recording ==
The album was recorded in several studios. Producer Rich Costey first flew to Copenhagen to record "Snow Brigade". They were supposed to continue working in Copenhagen, but the September 11 attacks changed the band's plans, and they ended up flying to Los Angeles to record "Am I Wry? No", "She Came Home for Christmas" and a few B-sides.

== Track listing ==
All tracks are written by Jonas Bjerre, Bo Madsen, Johan Wohlert, and Silas Utke Graae Jørgensen.

Frengers track listing
No.	Title	Length
1.	"Am I Wry? No"	4:54
2.	"156"	4:55
3.	"Snow Brigade"	4:22
4.	"Symmetry"	5:39
5.	"Behind the Drapes"	3:40
6.	"Her Voice Is Beyond Her Years"	2:48
7.	"Eight Flew Over, One Was Destroyed"	4:48
8.	"She Came Home for Christmas"	3:55
9.	"She Spider"	4:44
10.	"Comforting Sounds"	8:53
Total length:		48:43

Bonus tracks on Japanese release
No.	Title	Length
11.	"I Should Have Been a Tsin-Tsi (For You)"	1:57
12.	"Wherever"	4:22
Total length:		55:02

15th Anniversary Deluxe Edition
No.	Title	Length
11.	"King Christian"	3:35
12.	"Mica"	3:31
13.	"That Time On The Ledge"	3:58
14.	"City Voices"	2:34
15.	"I Should Have Been a Tsin-Tsi (For You)"	1:57
16.	"Wherever"	4:22
17.	"Like Paper Cuts"	4:05

== Personnel ==
Mew

- Jonas Bjerre – vocals, guitars, piano, synthesizers
- Bo Madsen – guitars
- Johan Wohlert – bass, guitars
- Silas Utke Graae Jørgensen – drums, percussion

Additional musicians

- Patrick Warren – piano on tracks 1, 8
- Damon Tutunjian – additional vocals on track 2, additional guitars on track 9
- Becky Jarrett – vocals on track 4
- Nick Watts – piano on tracks 4, 10, synthesizers on tracks 9, 10
- Tobias Wilner Bertram – turntables on tracks 6, 8
- Rich Costey – ride cymbal on track 6
- Klaus Nielsen – piano on track 6
- Stina Nordenstam – vocals on track 6
- Bo Rande – trumpet on track 10

Technical

- Rich Costey – producer
- George Marino – mastering
- Flemming Rasmussen, Troels Alsted, Andreas Hviid, Dan Lefler, Darren Mora and Fred Archanbault – additional engineering

== Charts and certifications ==
=== Weekly charts ===
Weekly chart performance for Frengers
Chart (2003)	Peak position
Danish Albums (Hitlisten)	2
Norwegian Albums (VG-lista)	6

=== Certifications ===
Certifications and sales for Frengers
Region	Certification	Certified units/sales
Norway	—	17,000
