= Mew (band) =

Danish alternative rock band

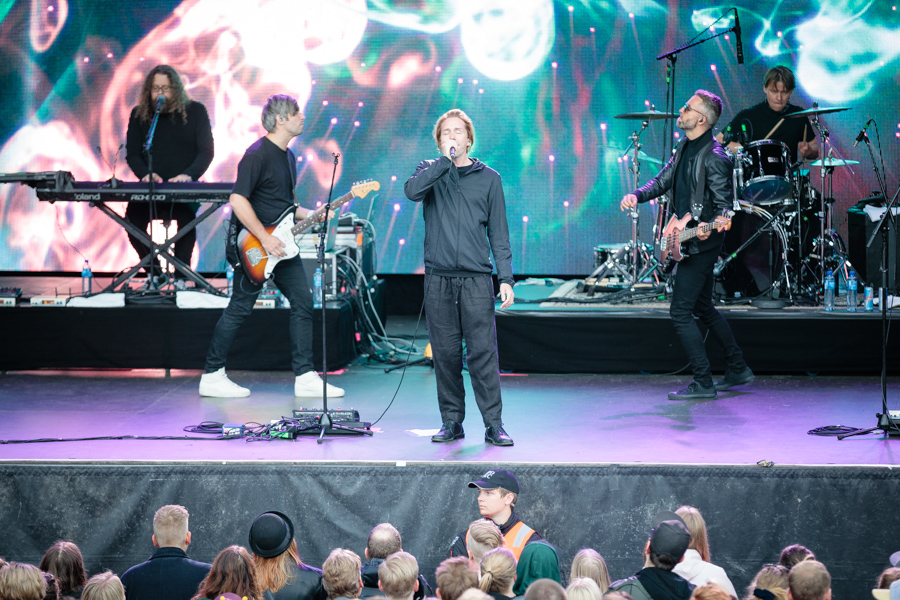
- Mew performing in Oslo in 2018

Background information
- Origin: Copenhagen, Denmark
- Genres: Alternative rock; indie rock; progressive rock; dream pop; post-rock; space pop
- Years active: 1995–2026
- Labels: Exlibris Musik, Evil Office, Sony BMG, Sony Music
- Past members: Jonas Bjerre; Silas Utke Graae Jørgensen; Bo Rune Madsen; Johan Wohlert
- Website: www.mewsite.com

Mew were a Danish alternative rock band from Copenhagen, formed in 1995. The band's core lineup consisted of lead singer Jonas Bjerre, guitarist Bo Madsen, bassist Johan Wohlert and drummer Silas Utke Graae Jørgensen. Madsen left the band in 2015, while Wohlert was absent from the band from 2006 to 2013.

The band began to receive international attention with their third album, Frengers, in 2003. Two of their albums reached number one in Denmark: No More Stories... (2009) and + − (2015), with the former being their only to chart in the United States. In 2025 and 2026, the band went on a global farewell tour.

Whilst their music may be classified as indie and on occasion progressive rock, former guitarist Bo Madsen said "I usually say we are 'indie stadium.' A mix between 'feelings' and 'thinking' is usually good."

== History ==
=== Formation and debut album (1995–2000) ===
Formed in 1995 in Hellerup, a suburb of Copenhagen, they had a profound impact on the Danish indie scene, emerging alongside the likes of Carpark North, Swan Lee and Saybia, in the early 2000s. They released their debut album A Triumph for Man in April 1997 and its follow-up Half the World is Watching Me was released in May 2000.

=== Frengers (2003–2004) ===
Their first commercial success came with their third album Frengers, released in 2003. At the 2004 Steppeulven awards, Mew won the awards for "Album of the Year" and "Band of the Year". After a European tour supporting R.E.M., they began to attract wider attention.

=== And the Glass Handed Kites (2005–2008) ===
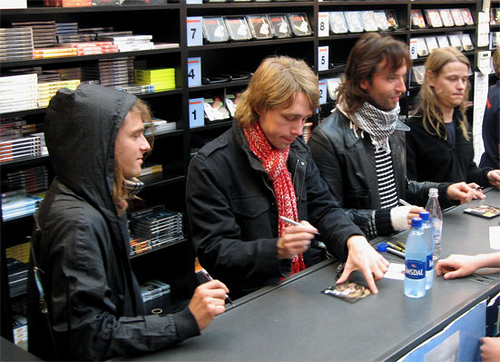
Mew signing autographs in 2006

Their next album And the Glass Handed Kites was released in Denmark on 19 September 2005, in the rest of Europe on 26 September, and in the United States on 25 July 2006. The album received critical acclaim, with Mew described as making "dreamy thunderstorm pop". At the 2006 Danish Music Awards, they won four awards.

On 11 April 2006, Wohlert left the band to spend more time with his girlfriend, Pernille Rosendahl, of the band Swan Lee, who was to give birth to their son in May 2006. The two would later go on to form a duo, The Storm.

The band toured with Nick Watts (formerly of UK indie band Headswim) as their keyboardist, and Bastian Juel (who used to act as a studio and live bassist for Swan Lee) joined them as their live bassist. The band finished touring for And the Glass Handed Kites in the summer of 2007. They returned to Brooklyn, New York in May 2008 in order to begin recording their next record, and tapped Rich Costey (who produced their breakthrough album, Frengers) once again as producer.

=== No More Stories... (2009–2010) ===
The band's fifth album No More Stories Are Told Today, I'm Sorry They Washed Away // No More Stories, The World Is Grey, I'm Tired, Let's Wash Away was released on 17 August 2009 in Scandinavia, 24 August in the UK and 25 August in the US. In 2009, the band supported Nine Inch Nails for various tour dates across Europe and the United States.

On 25 October 2010 Mew released their first compilation album entitled, Eggs Are Funny, which featured 14 songs from previous albums as well as one new song, "Do You Love It?". The track list was compiled of what Mew consider to be their "best work".

=== + - (2012–2015) ===
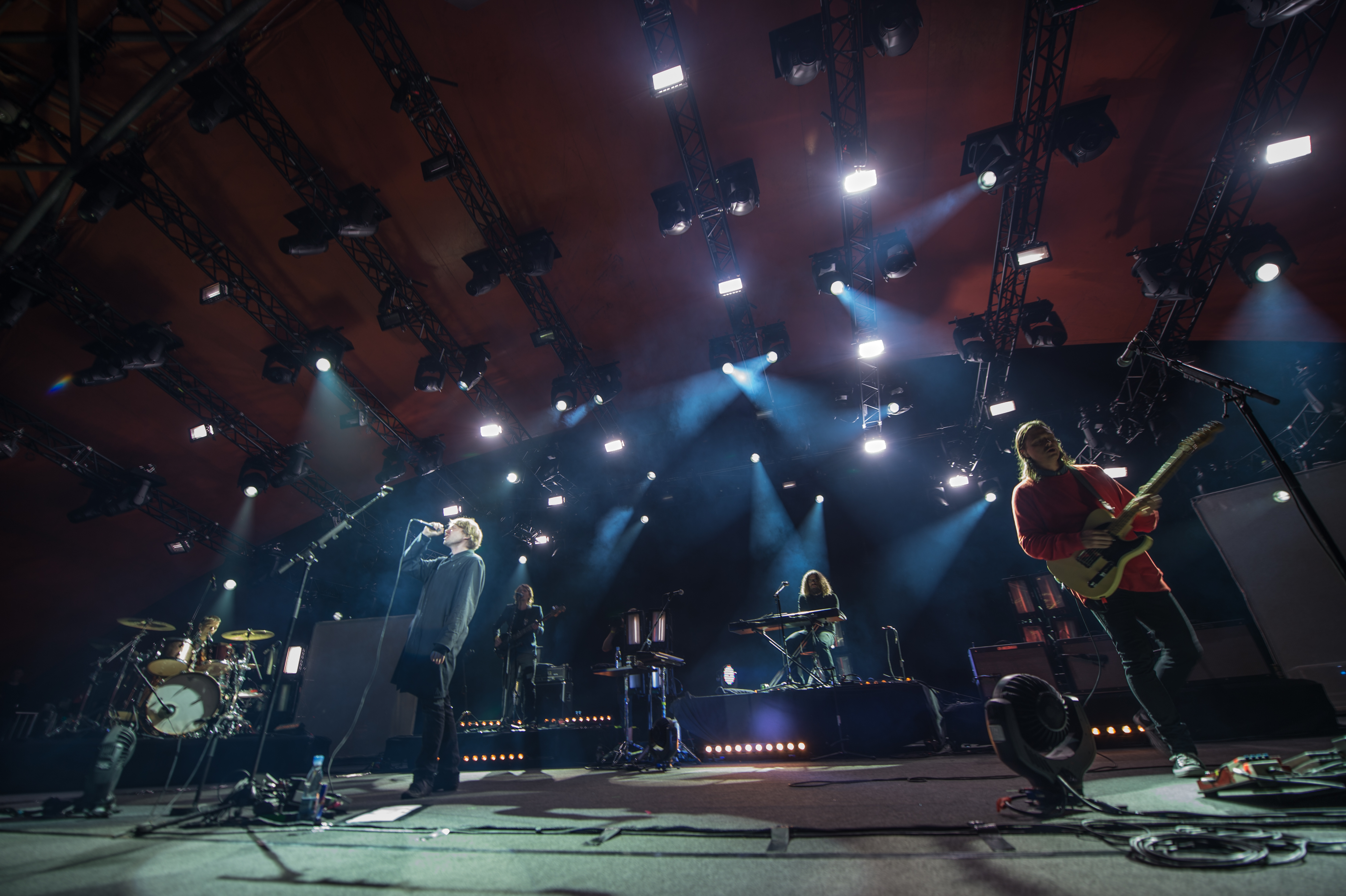
Mew performing on Roskilde Festival in 2012

During summer 2012, Mew premiered two new songs, with the working titles "Boy" and "Klassen", that were in the running to feature on their sixth studio album, at shows in Scandinavia.

On 23 January 2013 Mew announced via their Facebook page that they were no longer signed to Sony and would release new music independently. On 9 April they confirmed, again via Facebook, that they had started preproduction on their 6th studio album with producer Michael Beinhorn.

On 25 September they released an iOS app entitled Sensory Spaces in conjunction with B&O Play. The app contained, amongst other things, a preview of a new song, "Making Friends", which featured on the upcoming album. In November 2013 "Making Friends (13)" was made available to stream via Spotify and as a free download via the Sensory Spaces website. The band pointed out that it was not a single, but a thank you to their fans for waiting while they completed the upcoming album and that the album would contain a different version of the song.

During a concert at NorthSide Festival in Aarhus, Denmark on 14 June 2014, Johan Wohlert was formally reintroduced as a member of the band and he played live with the band for the first time since 2006. While the band were onstage, fansite mewx.info posted an article confirming that he had been involved in the writing and recording of the upcoming album.

On 16 June 2014, Mew announced a Nordic tour for winter 2014 and that the album would be released in 2015.

As of the Northside show on 14 June 2014, the new songs that had been played live and were thought to be in the running to feature on the new album were tentatively titled "Making Friends", "Klassen", "Russle", which featured a guitar part by Russell Lissack, "Witness", "Changes" and "Boy". Aside from "Making Friends", it was unknown which songs would be featured on the album and what their official titles would be. With the release of the album, the official titles of these songs were confirmed, and "Boy" was not featured on the album. Some of the songs were released with different names; "Klassen" became "Satellites", "Russle" became "My Complications", and "Changes" became "Clinging To A Bad Dream".

On 13 August they announced via Twitter that they had begun mixing the album. On 19 September, they tweeted that they had finished the upcoming album and that release details would follow soon after.

The band announced on 19 January 2015 that the sixth album, + -, will be released on 27 April through Play It Again Sam. They also released the first single off the album called "Satellites" (previously known by the working title "Klassen").

Mew performed at South by Southwest in Austin, Texas on 18 March 2015.

On 1 July 2015 it was announced that guitarist Bo Madsen had left the band. Mew posted a statement on their official website saying, "After 20 years playing together in Mew, the band and Bo Madsen have decided to part ways for the time being." Speculations about Madsen's departure began circulating when the guitarist was not present at a concert in The Netherlands on 21 June 2015 and in Sweden on 26 June 2015.

=== Visuals (2017) ===
On 24 January 2017, Mew announced their first album following Bo Madsen's departure, entitled Visuals, via their official website, while a song from the album, "Carry Me to Safety", was premiered on Danish radio station P6 Beat. On February 16 the album's first proper single, entitled "85 Videos", was made available to stream or download, while a video for the song, directed by Jonas Bjerre, was revealed on YouTube. Visuals was released on 28 April 2017, and the band embarked on a world tour to promote the album soon after.

In 2018, the band announced a 15th anniversary reissue of Frengers as well as a short tour where they performed the album in full.

On 14 December 2018, Mew released the With Copenhagen Philharmonic album. It comprised both live recordings and separate studio sessions of songs that had been modified and recorded in collaboration with the Copenhagen Philharmonic Orchestra.

Mew announced a 15th anniversary And the Glass Handed Kites tour scheduled to take place beginning in May 2020. The United States shows were cancelled and never rescheduled because of the COVID-19 pandemic, and the European shows eventually began in August 2021.

=== Farewell shows (2024–2026) ===
On 10 September 2024, after some studio activity and only occasional live performances, the band announced two "farewell" shows to be taking place in Denmark in May 2025, including a final show at the Royal Arena in Copenhagen on 31 May. Bjerre stated that he "[had] come to the realization that it's time for [him] personally to embark on a different journey, and focus on other creative projects." The band later announced further worldwide shows, with their final performance taking place at the Roundhouse in London on 5 February 2026.

== Band name ==
Bjerre explained that the name came from their days in high school when, disappointed after baking a "disgusting" cake, the members threw possible band names around, and Mew stuck. "It had a sort of incomplete symmetry to it – it was kinda pointy at the edges and soft in the middle with the small E. There wasn't any deeper thought behind it than that, just how it sounded and looked. And it had a mystery to it, in a way," Bjerre said. The band's name has no affiliation or relation to the Pokémon of the same name; the franchise began in 1996, a year after the band originally formed. Bjerre remarked to New Noise in 2015 regarding the confusion: "Nintendo came out with that concept a couple of years after we arrived at that name, and for a little while it was a bit annoying because there were those who assumed we were somehow connected (or named after) that little pink kitty cat. But it’s not something that ever made us consider changing names or anything."

== Reception ==
Mew has been praised by fellow musicians including Bono of U2, Trent Reznor of Nine Inch Nails, Jesse Lacey of Brand New, Brian Aubert of Silversun Pickups, and Zac Farro of Paramore.

== Band members ==
=== Final line-up ===
- Jonas Bjerre – lead vocals, keyboards, guitar (1995–2026)
- Johan Wohlert – bass guitar, backing vocals, guitar (1995–2006, 2013–2026)
- Silas Utke Graae Jørgensen – drums, percussion (1995–2026)
- Nick Watts – keyboards, backing vocals, guitar (2001–2026; touring)
- Mads Wegner – guitar, backing vocals (2015–2026; touring)

=== Former members ===
- Bo Madsen – guitar, backing vocals (1995–2015)
- Bastian Juel – bass (2006–2013; touring)

== Discography ==
Studio albums

- A Triumph for Man (1997)
- Half the World Is Watching Me (2000)
- Frengers (2003)
- And the Glass Handed Kites (2005)
- No More Stories... (2009)
- + − (2015)
- Visuals (2017)

== Videography ==
=== DVDs ===
- Live in Copenhagen (2006)
