= Emma Leth =

Danish actress and model (born 1990)

Emma Rosensweig
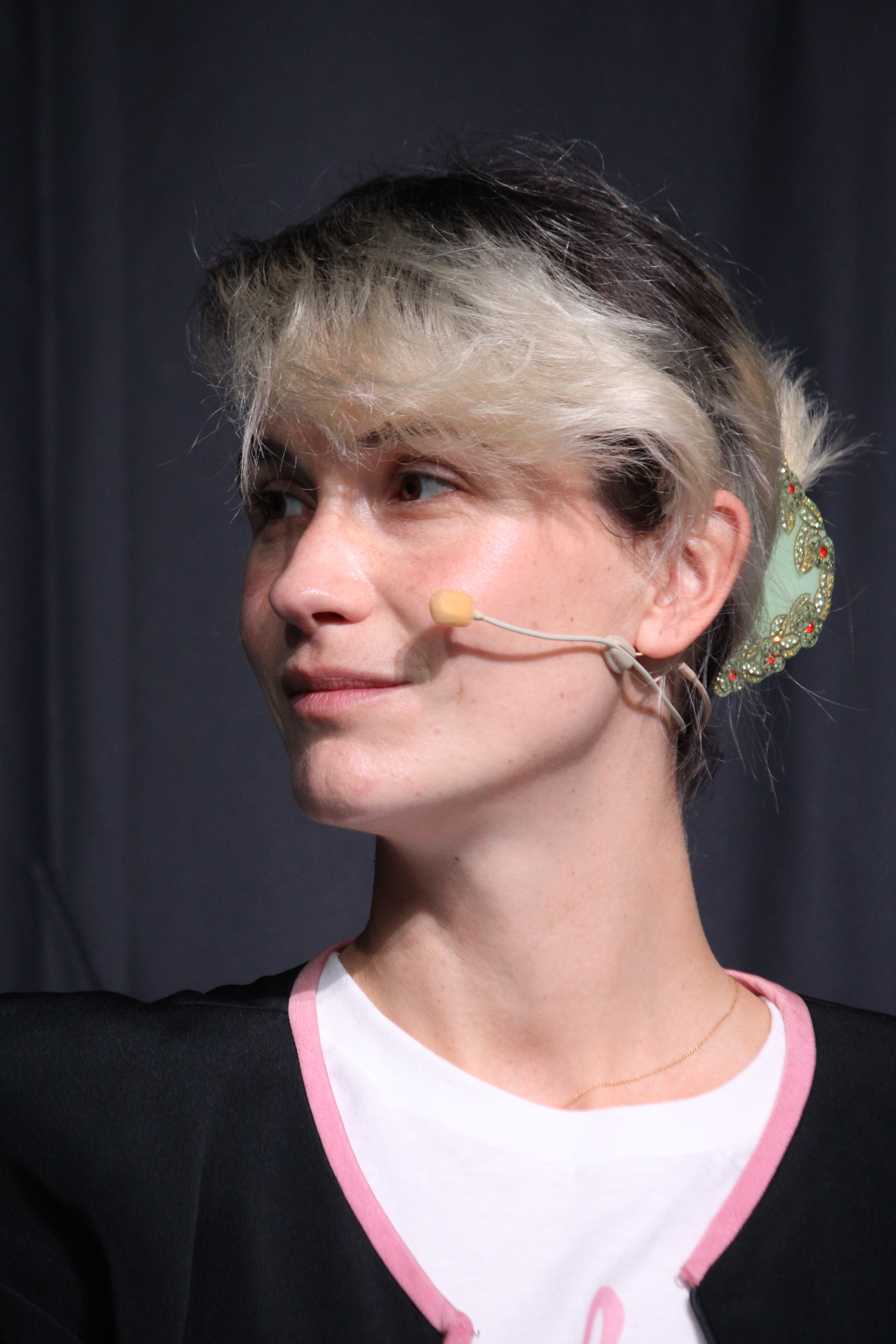
- Rosenzweig in 2025
- Born: 26 July 1990 (age 35)
- Occupations: Actress; model
- Spouse: Tal R (m. 2018)
- Children: 1

Emma Leth, became Emma Rosenzweig (born 26 July 1990) is a Danish actress and model.

== Life ==
Leth is the grand daughter of the Danish journalist and poet, Jørgen Leth, and sister of Aksel Leth.

She has appeared in several Danish movies and TV-series since she was a child, such as Supervoksen (aka Triple Dare) (2006), Tempelriddernes Skat III (2008), Rejseholdet (2001) and more recently Sandheden om mænd (2010). Besides Emma's movie- and TV-series career, she also works as a model and has among others worked with Balenciaga for several years. She has also worked with brands such as GANNI, ZARA and Sophie Bille Brahe.

== Private life ==
Leth married Danish artist Tal R in 2018. They had a son in 2016 and they live in Copenhagen.

== Filmography ==
=== Cinema ===
- Supervoksen (2006)
- skat III Tempelriddernes skat III (2008)
- Sandheden om mænd (2010)

=== Television ===
- Rejseholdet (2001)
- Kristian (2009)

Short film

- 14 Fucking 14 (2005)
- Et andet sted (2006)
- (kortfilm) Alliancen (2008)
- Tick Boom Tick Tick Boom (2009)
- historie om en pigetrio En historie om en pigetrio (2009)
