= And the Glass Handed Kites =

Studio album by Mew
- Released: 19 September 2005
- Recorded: 2004–2005
- Studios: Michael Beinhorn's place, Venice Beach, California; Mox Studios, Copenhagen, Denmark
- Genres: Indie rock; progressive rock; neo-psychedelia; post-rock; math rock; post-punk revival
- Length: 53:59
- Label: Sony BMG
- Producer: Michael Beinhorn

Mew chronology
Frengers (2003)	And the Glass Handed Kites (2005)	No More Stories... (2009)

Singles from And the Glass Handed Kites
- 1. "Apocalypso" Released: 18 July 2005; 2. "Special" Released: 19 September 2005; 3. "Why Are You Looking Grave?" Released: 6 February 2006; 4. "The Zookeeper's Boy" Released: 17 April 2006

Professional ratings
Review scores
Source	Rating
AllMusic	4/5 stars
Drowned in Sound	9/10
Entertainment Weekly	B
Gaffa	4/6 stars
IGN	7.5/10
Pitchfork	8.4/10
PopMatters	7/10 stars

And the Glass Handed Kites is the fourth studio album by Danish alternative rock band Mew. It was released on 19 September 2005, and in the United States on 25 July 2006.

And the Glass Handed Kites was composed as a single continuous suite, and critics have likened the album to one long song due to the tracks' unnoticed transitions.

The album has won several music prizes in Denmark, including four Danish Music Awards. The album also helped Mew win awards outside of Denmark, with the band winning the 2005 MTV Europe Music Award for Best Danish Act.

The Japanese bonus track, "Shiroi Kuchibiruno Izanai" is an alternate version of "White Lips Kissed" with the lyrics and title translated into Japanese.

== Critical reception ==
And the Glass Handed Kites has been well received by critics. James Christopher Monger of AllMusic gave the album a positive review, writing "Fans of OK Computer-era Radiohead, My Bloody Valentine, and Disintegration-era Cure will find And the Glass Handed Kites one of the most breathtaking things to come along since the dawn of the dream pop/post-punk genres themselves."

Pitchfork reviewer Nitsuh Abebe praised the album's epic feel and called the album "a terrific accomplishment". The same website also criticized the album cover, naming it one of the worst album covers of 2006.

In a more mixed review, Conrad Amenta of Cokemachineglow.com wrote "The real shame is that on this album... the songs become secondary to the gesture. They are denied a sense of finality or, in And the Glass Handed Kite's case, are sometimes deprived of an ending altogether." Amenta concluded: "The band does have the musical ability, their songs are reasonably well constructed, and the melodies are there. It’s only the ridiculous costume of importance they wear so self-consciously that’ll keep them from ever joining the party."

Gaffa named And the Glass Handed Kites the best Danish album of 2005.

== Commercial performance ==
And the Glass Handed Kites peaked at number 2 on Denmark's Tracklisten. Four singles were released for the album: "Apocalypso", "Special", "Why Are You Looking Grave?" and "The Zookeeper's Boy". Despite originally not having been released as a single, the track "The Zookeeper's Boy" gained massive popularity with the biggest radio station in Denmark, P3, reaching number 1 on the radio's Tjeklisten charts from 9 October 2005 through 6 November 2005. The track was voted "Hit of the Year" by Gaffa readers, with another Mew song ("Special") coming in second. "The Zookeeper's Boy" was later released as a single in 2006.

== Track listing ==
All tracks are written by Jonas Bjerre, Bo Madsen, Johan Wohlert, and Silas Utke Graae Jørgensen.

And the Glass Handed Kites track listing
No.	Title	Length
1.	"Circuitry of the Wolf"	2:45
2.	"Chinaberry Tree"	3:33
3.	"Why Are You Looking Grave?" (features vocals by J Mascis)	3:50
4.	"Fox Cub"	1:15
5.	"Apocalypso"	4:46
6.	"Special"	3:12
7.	"The Zookeeper's Boy"	4:43
8.	"A Dark Design"	3:29
9.	"Saviours of Jazz Ballet" (song ends at 2:05, followed by instrumental track "Fear Me, December")	3:18
10.	"An Envoy to the Open Fields" (features vocals by J Mascis)	3:40
11.	"Small Ambulance"	1:05
12.	"The Seething Rain Weeps for You" (song ends at 3:12, followed by instrumental track "Uda Pruda")	4:18
13.	"White Lips Kissed"	6:45
14.	"Louise Louisa"	7:20
Total length:		53:59

Bonus tracks on Japanese release
No.	Title	Length
15.	"Forever and Ever"	4:20
16.	"Shiroi Kuchibiruno Izanai" ("White Lips Kissed" with Japanese lyrics)	5:34
Total length:		63:53

== Personnel ==
Mew

- Jonas Bjerre – vocals, guitars, piano, synthesizers
- Bo Madsen – guitars
- Johan Wohlert – bass, guitars
- Silas Utke Graae Jørgensen – drums, percussion

Additional musicians

- Lasse Mauritzen – french horn on tracks 2, 3, 14
- J Mascis – additional vocals on track 3, additional background vocals on track 10
- Bo Rande – flugelhorn (tracks 2, 3), trumpet (tracks 13, 14)
- Rebecca Stark – soprano vocals on tracks 2, 8
- Damon Tutunjian – additional guitar on track 5
- Boys' choir on track 13
  - Mathias Aagaard Christensen
  - Frederik Peter Jakobsen
  - Niklas Emil De Fries
  - Frederik Stadager Larsen

Technical

- Michael Beinhorn – producer, engineer
- Joshua – producer on track 13
- Kevin Bacon – mixing
- Frank Filipetti – engineer
- George Marino – mastering
- Mads Nørgård – engineer
- Jonathan Quarmby – mixing
- Felipe Tichauer – engineer

== Charts ==
=== Weekly charts ===
Weekly chart performance for And the Glass Handed Kites
Chart (2005–2006)	Peak position
Danish Albums (Hitlisten)	2
Finnish Albums (Suomen virallinen lista)	4
Norwegian Albums (VG-lista)	4
Swedish Albums (Sverigetopplistan)	36
