= Eggs Are Funny =

Compilation album by Mew
- Released: 25 October 2010
- Genre: Alternative rock, indie rock, dream pop, new prog, shoegazing, post-rock
- Length: 66:46
- Label: Sony

Professional ratings
Review scores
Source	Rating
AllMusic	4/5 stars
The A.V. Club	B

Eggs Are Funny is the first compilation album from the Danish alternative band Mew. It was released in Scandinavia on 25 October 2010 and internationally on 11 January 2011 as a digital download.

The compilation includes 14 songs from previous albums as well as one new song, "Do You Love It?" The track list was compiled from what Mew consider to be their "best work."

== Critical reception ==
The A.V. Club wrote that "it’s difficult to think of another group that’s this committed to pop songcraft, and yet that colors so far outside the lines with its music, creating a sound that really is the band’s alone."

== Track listing ==
No.	Title	Length
1	Am I Wry? No	4:54
2	Snow Brigade	4:22
3	Beach	2:46
4	Introducing Palace Players	4:46
5	Silas the Magic Car	4:02
6	Wheels Over Me	2:35
7	Saliva	4:11
8	She Came Home for Christmas	3:55
9	Sometimes Life Isn't Easy	5:21
10	Do You Love It?	2:56
11	Eight Flew Over, One Was Destroyed	4:48
12	156	4:55
13	Special	3:12
14	The Zookeeper's Boy	4:43
15	Comforting Sounds	8:58
16	Apocalypso (Japanese edition bonus track)	4:46
17	King Christian (Japanese edition bonus track)	3:34
