= Fielfraz =

Danish band

Fielfraz was a Danish rock band, which had its heyday between 1990 and 1996. The band consisted of Claus Hempler (guitar and vocals), Nils Brakchi (bass), Kenneth Priisholm on (lead guitar) and Jens Langhorn (drums).

== History ==
After several years of building up a live reputation in Odense, Fielfraz broke through with their very first record Shine, a Beatlesque guitar-oriented rock record. 1992's Electric Eel also included big radio hits like Surfer and Naked but the album as a whole was a lesser success. The third album, Slick, came late in 1996 and although widely critically acclaimed, it was largely ignored by the public.

Fielfraz continued to perform live occasionally, but Priisholm eventually left the band for good, leaving Fielfraz as a trio which released Hempler in 2004.

== Influence ==
Fielfraz have been cited as an influence on Danish rock and grunge bands that broke through in the early 1990s like Kashmir and Dizzy Mizz Lizzy. However Fielfraz´ own influences were primarily British; Priisholm's guitar playing was influenced by new wave artists like XTC and experimental rock acts such as King Crimson. Claus Hempler's lyrics and vocal style were derived from Elvis Costello and Pulp's Jarvis Cocker

Fielfraz' marked a transitional period in the history of Danish rock, that broke the pop hegemony established by acts like Gnags, TV-2 and Sanne Salomonsen, in the 1980s. Alongside a few other British influenced 1990s acts like The Sandmen and Simcess, and the American influenced rock of D-A-D, they made the commercial breakthrough for the rock scene in Denmark, by getting airplay on the dominating radio stations, Danmarks Radio and P3.

== Discography ==
- Shine (1990) - Genlyd/BMG
- Electric Eel (1992) - Genlyd/BMG
- Slick (1996) - Virgin
