= Swan Lee =

Danish band

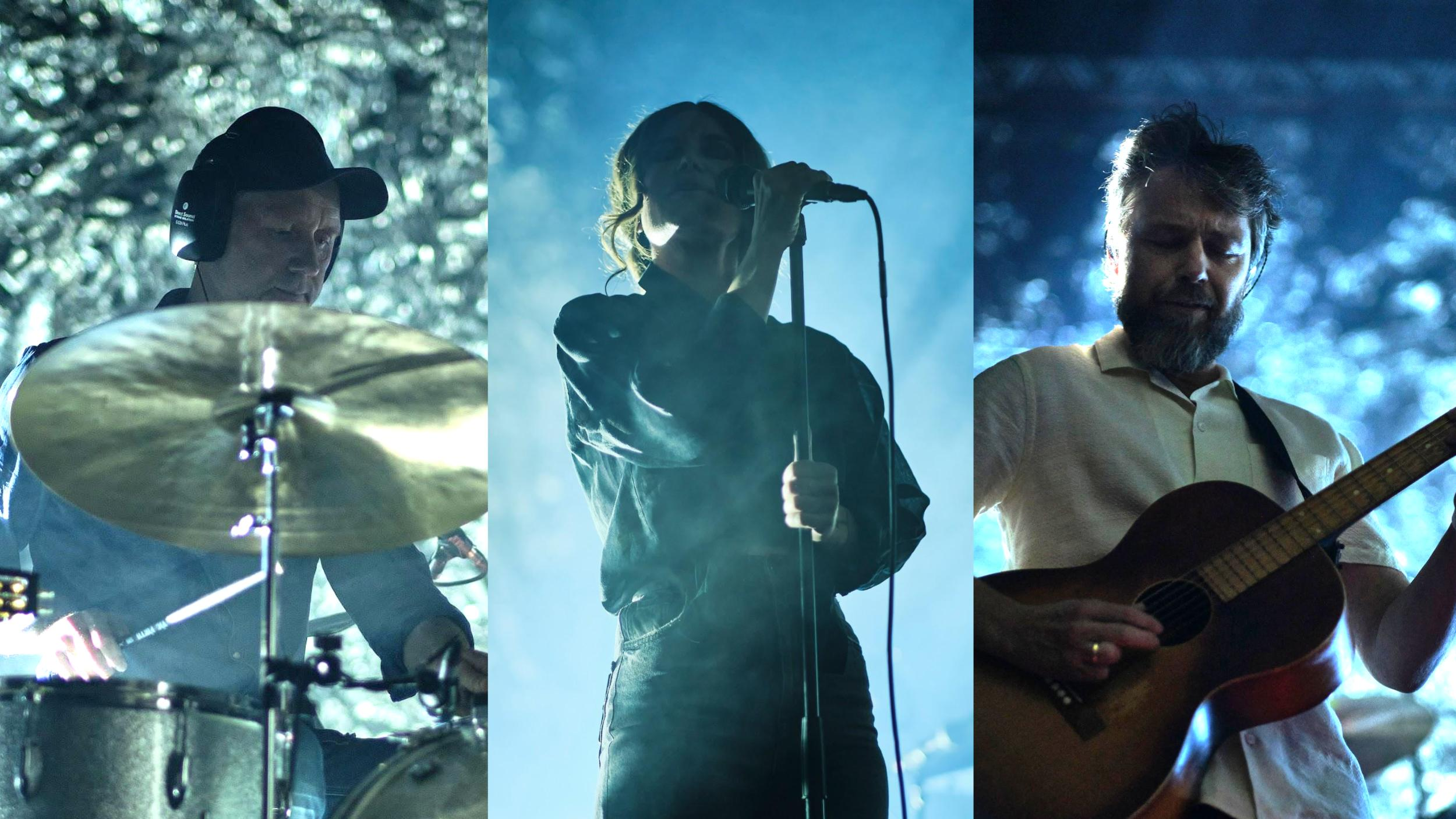
- Swan Lee (from left to right): Emil Jørgensen, Pernille Rosendahl and Jonas Struck

Background information
- Origin: Denmark
- Genres: Rock
- Years active: 1996–present
- Label: GoGo
- Members: Pernille Rosendahl; Jonas Struck; Emil Jørgensen
- Website: swanlee.dk

Swan Lee is a Danish indie rock band consisting of singer Pernille Rosendahl, guitarist Jonas Struck and drummer Emil Jørgensen. Swan Lee has released three albums on their own label GoGo Records: Enter (2001), Swan Lee (2004) and The Garden (2023). They have won Danmarks Radio's P3 award, and are particularly known for the singles "Tomorrow Never Dies", "Love Will Keep You Warm" and "I Don't Mind".

== History ==
=== 1980s - 2001: Formation and the early years ===
Pernille Rosendahl, Jonas Struck and Emil Jørgensen met in Nykøbing Falster in the 1980s. Jonas Struck and Emil Jørgensen attended Nykøbing Falster Music School and later played together in the band Cactus Circle. In 1985, Emil Jørgensen and Pernille Rosendahl played together in the reggae band Rockae. In 2023, the band described to DR that they listened to music together in their teenage years, including jazz and psychedelic rock such as Pink Floyd, Charles Mingus, Savage Rose and John Coltrane's Africa/Brass album.

In 1996, singer Pernille Rosendahl, guitarist Jonas Struck, drummer Emil Jørgensen formed a band. Under Pernille Rosendahl's name, the group released the EP "Dream Away" in 1997 on Cannibal Records. In 1999 the band took the name Swan Lee, named after a Syd Barrett track. From 1998 to 2001, the trio sought out record companies to enter into a contract for an album release, but this resulted in rejection, as they could only see potential in Pernille Rosendahl as a solo artist. In 2001, the band borrowed DKK 350,000 to start their own record company GoGo Records and released their debut album Enter. Film director Christina Rosendahl, and sister of Pernille Rosendahl, depicted the band's struggle to realize their dream of a record deal in the documentary "Stjernekigger" from 2002. With their self-releases, the band became a living example of entrepreneurship and gave lectures under the title "Do It Yourself" at Danish educational institutions. In the band and the record company, Emil Jørgensen was in charge of the contact with accountants and lawyers, Jonas Struck was bandmaster and Pernille Rosendahl was in charge of the graphic expression, etc.

=== 2001: Enter ===
In February 2001, their debut album Enter was released. The album sold 40,000 copies and peaked at No. 27 on the Danish album chart. Gaffa's music critic Jan Opstrup Poulsen wrote "Enter offers a sophisticated and experimental rock music that draws on the great known film themes and a backward approach to the musical expression." Pernille Rosendahl's vocals were described by music critic Thomas B. Knudsen as 'a unique voice that can vary from the violently grandiose to the frail and fragile.' The album was about growing up, and Pernille Rosendahl and Jonas Struck were the main composers behind the ten songs. The singles "Stay Tonight" and "Tomorrow Never Dies" were filmed as music videos by Christina Rosendahl. The single "Tomorrow Never Dies", which was written in collaboration with Tim Christensen, was close to being chosen as the title tune for the James Bond film of the same name. The song was used in IO Interactive's computer game Hitman: Blood Money in 2006.

In 2002, the band received Danmarks Radio's P3 Prize and was nominated for six prizes with the Danish Music Awards; 'Danish Group of the Year', 'Danish Album of the Year', 'Danish Singer of the Year', 'Rock Release of the Year' and 'New Danish Name of the Year'. The single "Tomorrow Never Dies" was nominated for 'Danish Hit of the Year'.

The band debuted under the name Swan Lee, as support for Coldplay at a concert in Store Vega. In 2001, the band toured Denmark where they played, among other things, at Spillestedet Rust in Copenhagen, Gimle in Roskilde, Musikcafeen in Århus, Stars in Vordingborg, Studenterhuset in Odense, Roskilde Festival, Skanderborg Festival and Midtfyns Festival. They ended their tour with a sit-down concert "Kiss Kiss Bang Bang'" at Store Vega which included guest soloists, brass bands, cabaret dancers and film screening. In 2002, they were the warm-up band for the British group Suede on their European tour, where they performed in Brussels, Amsterdam, Hamburg, Berlin, Oslo and Stockholm, among others.

=== 2004: Swan Lee ===
In 2004, the group released the album Swan Lee on GoGo Records, which sold over 20,000 copies in a day and a half and became a commercial success. The album reached number one on the album chart and the single "I Don't Mind" peaked at No. 3. Gaffa wrote "Swan Lee is the most anticipated album here in time immemorial." The album went double platinum and sold over 80,000 copies. The singles "I Don't Mind", "Love Will Keep You Warm" and "What is Love" became No. 1 on the Danish charts. The album was produced in collaboration with Per Sunding from Tambourine Studios who introduced a more pop -inspired sound. In an interview in 2023, Pernille Rosendahl describes the creation of the single "I Don't Mind," and how the collaboration with Per Sunding challenged the band's sound and her vocals. The single is included on Playstation 2's Singstar Legends. The singles "I Don't Mind" and "Love Will Keep You Warm" were filmed as music videos by Christina Rosendahl.

In 2004, the band toured Denmark and played over 50 concerts, including three selected shows in Store Vega. In the same year, the band performed at Arena at the Roskilde Festival, where Pernille Rosendahl sang a duet with Claus Hempler and the American soul singer Howard Tate. The band helped open the international music festival MIDEM in Cannes, where they promoted Danish rock and pop music with, among others, Kashmir and Tim Christensen. In the same year, the band performed together with the Danish Royal Chamber and the Royal Ballet with the single "Lord Knows, I Can Be Strong." In 2005, they also played in Tokyo and in Nagoya in Japan in connection with the Expo 2005 exhibition.

In 2004, Pernille Rosendahl received the award as "Singer of the Year" at the Zulu Awards. In 2005, she received the award as "Danish Singer of the Year" at the Danish Music Awards.

Swan Lee chose to disband in September 2005, a few days before they were to have played with Nick Cave for the Danish Crown Prince Couple's cultural award.

In 2007, the band released a compilation album The Complete Collection 1997-2005" which also included cover versions of Grethe and Jørgen Ingmann's "Dansevise" and New Order's "Blue Monday".

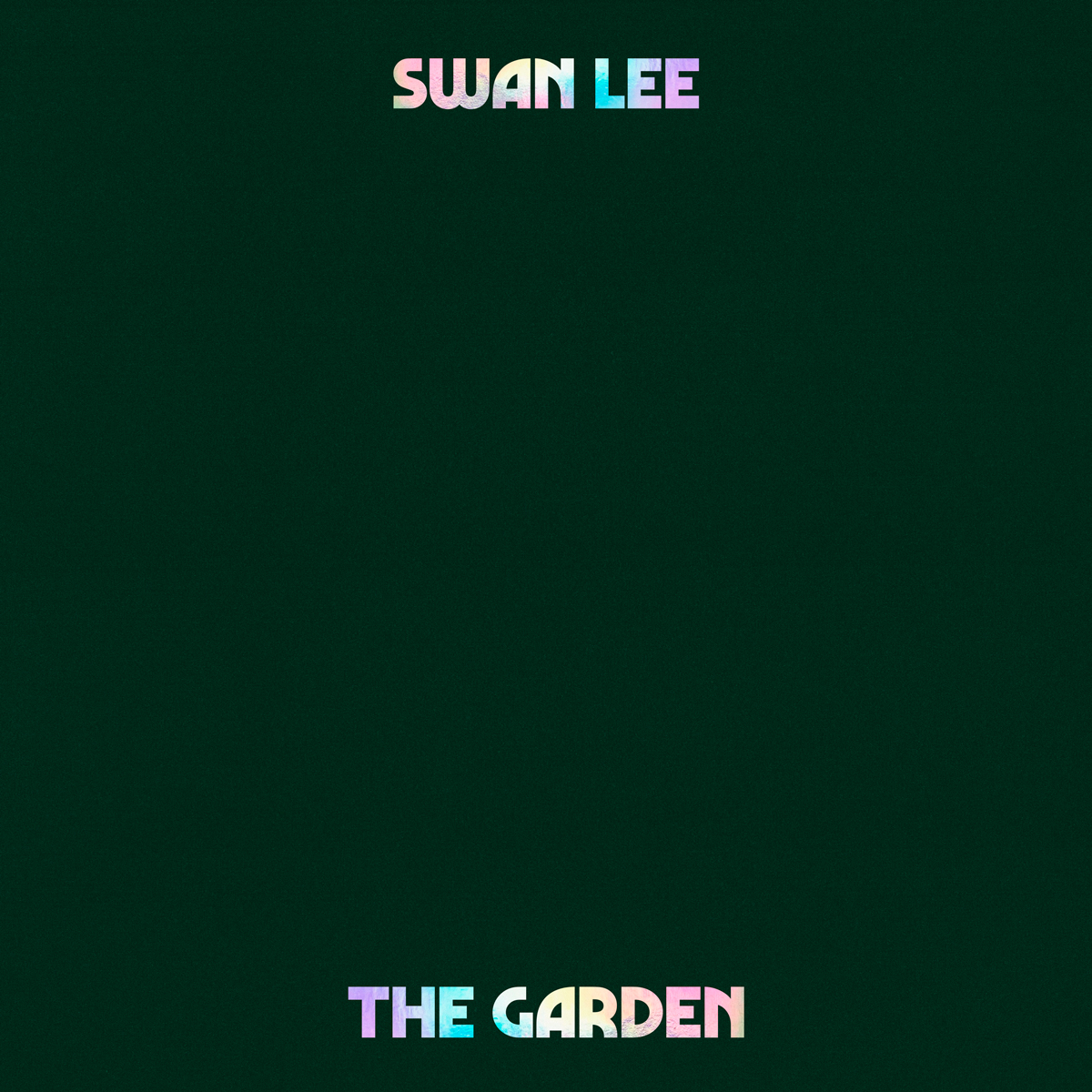
The Garden (2023)

=== 2023: The Garden ===
In 2017, Jonas Struck helped with the creation of Pernille Rosendahl's second solo album The Hurt, realizing that their creative vein was intact and giving them inspiration to later restore Swan Lee. They met with the drummer Emil Jørgensen for a lunch at Lumskebugten where they decided to create new music together again and restore the band.

After a 17-year hiatus, their third album The Garden was released on GoGo Records in January 2023. The album was produced in collaboration with Søren Buhl Lassen from Blaue Blume and recorded in his studio in Valby. The band also worked with the musician Teitur Lassen, and visited him in the Faroe Islands several times to write the songs "The River," "Nature's Highway," "Got Away With Murder" and "The Garden", among others. The majority of the album was created during the corona epidemic and with nature as inspiration, the songs deal with divorce, #metoo, love and friendship. The band has described the album as a collective voice and an affirmation of their close friendship and creative curiosity. The track "I Am A River" was inspired, among other things, by the double drum set on Savage Rose's debut album "Your Sign". The singles "Heaven" and "How Forgiveness Goes" achieved radio airplay. Berlingske music reviewer Nanna Balslev wrote "Where in the 00s they made sharply defined pop-rock, the trio has re-emerged as a band that draws on longing Americana, cinematic synth surfaces, electronic undercurrents and acoustic guitars." Music reviewer Pernille Jensen from Politiken wrote "'The Garden' sneaks up on you like an old flame suddenly standing in front of you after far too many years and still just, well, really lovely."

Their first live performance was as part of the Brodie Sessions in January 2023. They played three singles with Teitur Lassen. The band played at the Danish Crown Prince Couple Awards 2022, which was used to announce their comeback and this show was also their first live performance and TV show since 2005. As part of their spring 2023 tour, they launched a charity campaign in partnership with Save the Children. Here they sold t-shirts with the slogan "Love Will Keep You Warm" from their 2004 single of the same name, to benefit vulnerable children. In June 2023, Save the Children's director Johanne Schmidt-Nielsen could announce that sales had exceeded more than half a million kroner.

== Discography ==
- Enter (2001)
- Swan Lee (2004)
- The Complete Collection 1997-2005 (2007)
- The Garden (2023)

== Filmography ==
- 'Stargazer' (2002)
