= A Triumph for Man =

Studio album by Mew
- Released: April 2nd, 1997
- Genre: Alternative rock, indie pop, post-rock, shoegazing
- Length: 46:59
- Label: Exlibris Musik
- Producer: Mew, Damon Tutunjian

Mew chronology
A Triumph for Man (1997)	Half the World Is Watching Me (2000)

Singles from A Triumph for Man
- 1. "I Should Have Been a Tsin-Tsi (For You)" Released: March 1997; 2. "She Came Home for Christmas" Released: 1997

Professional ratings
Review scores
Source	Rating
Gaffa	link
Soundvenue	link
Sputnikmusic	(3.5/5) link

A Triumph for Man is the first studio album by Danish band Mew, released in April 1997 by the Danish record label Exlibris Musik.

Only 2,000 copies of the album were printed initially and prices for an original copy have reached upwards of US$200 on auction site eBay.

On 18 September 2006 A Triumph for Man was re-released along with a CD with bonus material, including demos and acoustic versions of songs.

== Track listing ==
1. "Wheels over Me" – 2:33
2. "Beautiful Balloon" – 4:27
3. "Wherever" – 5:56
4. "Panda" – 4:11
5. "Then I Run" – 3:53
6. "Life Is Not Distant" – 1:08
7. "No Shadow Kick" – 3:06
8. "Snowflake" – 3:30
9. "She Came Home for Christmas" – 4:54
10. "Pink Monster" – 0:46
11. "I Should Have Been a Tsin-Tsi (for You)" – 2:19
12. "How Things Turn out to Be" – 0:44
13. "Web" – 4:34
14. "Coffee Break" – 4:37

=== 2006 reissue bonus disc ===
1. "Studio Snippet #1" – 0:31
2. "Say You're Sorry" (ATFM Session) – 6:09
3. "Beautiful Balloon" (acoustic) – 4:15
4. "Web" (demo) – 5:42
5. "Chinese Gun" (demo) – 3:06
6. "Studio Snippet #2" – 0:30
7. "I Should Have Been a Tsin-Tsi (For You)" (demo) – 1:43
8. "Wheels over Me" (demo) – 2:48
9. "Superfriends" (demo) – 4:40

== Personnel ==
- Jonas Bjerre - lead vocals, guitars, synthesizers, accordion, piano, glass
- Bo Madsen - guitars, synthesizers, piano, bell
- Johan Wohlert - bass, backing vocals, guitars, synthesizers, piano
- Silas Graae - drums, percussion

== Singles ==
Mew only released one proper single from their first album, "She Came Home for Christmas". However a promo-single "I Should Have Been a Tsin-Tsi (For You)" was released in March 1997, before the album.

Year	Single
1997	"I Should Have Been a Tsin-Tsi (for You)"
1997	"She Came Home for Christmas"
