= Johan Wohlert =

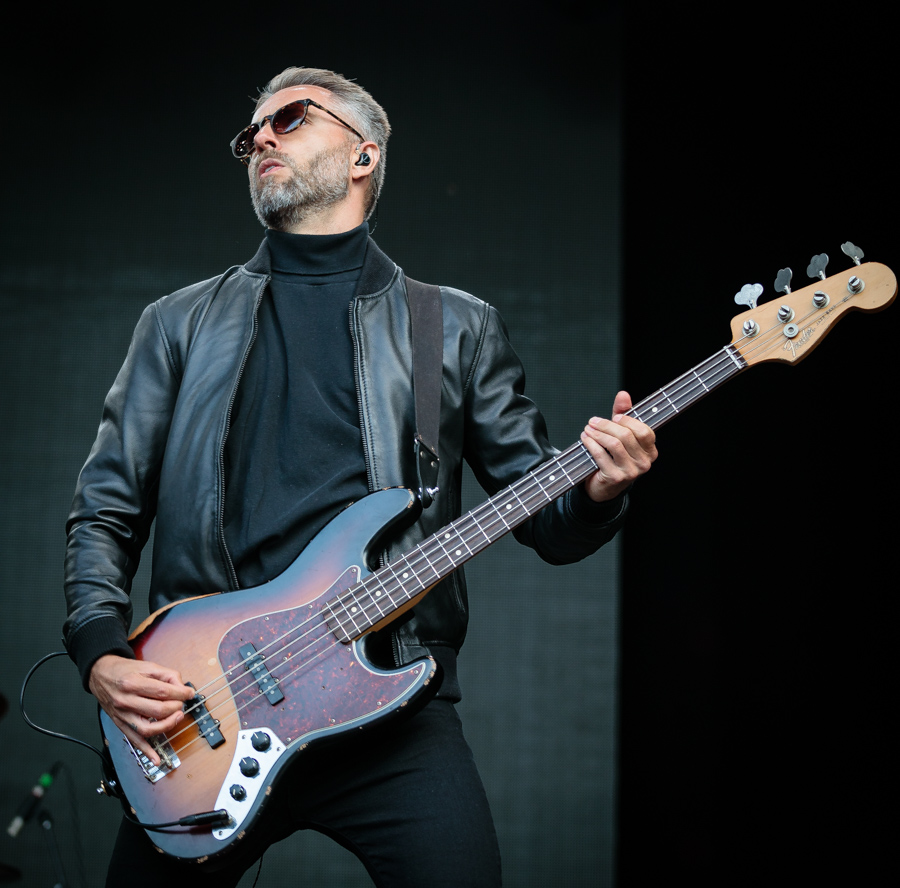

Background information
- Born: 10 March 1976 (age 50)
- Genres: Rock
- Occupation: Musician (bassist)
- Instrument: Bass guitar
- Years active: 1994–present
- Member of: The Storm
- Formerly of: Mew

Johan Haslund Wohlert (born 10 March 1976) is the bass player of Danish indie band Mew. He previously left the band on 11 April 2006, because he did not feel that he could be a rock star and a good father at the same time. He was boyfriend to Pernille Rosendahl, vocalist of the band Swan Lee, who is also the mother of his child, Tristan, who was born in May 2006.

Johan Wohlert and Pernille Rosendahl formed a new band, The Storm, in 2007 and released their first album Where the Storm Meets the Ground in February 2008. The album was not well received by the Danish critics or public.

Johan went to folkeskole at Bernadotteskolen and is a graduate from Østre Borgerdyd Gymnasium.

In June 2014, his return to Mew was announced at the Aarhus, Denmark, based music festival NorthSide Festival.
