= List of number-one singles from the 1980s (New Zealand) =

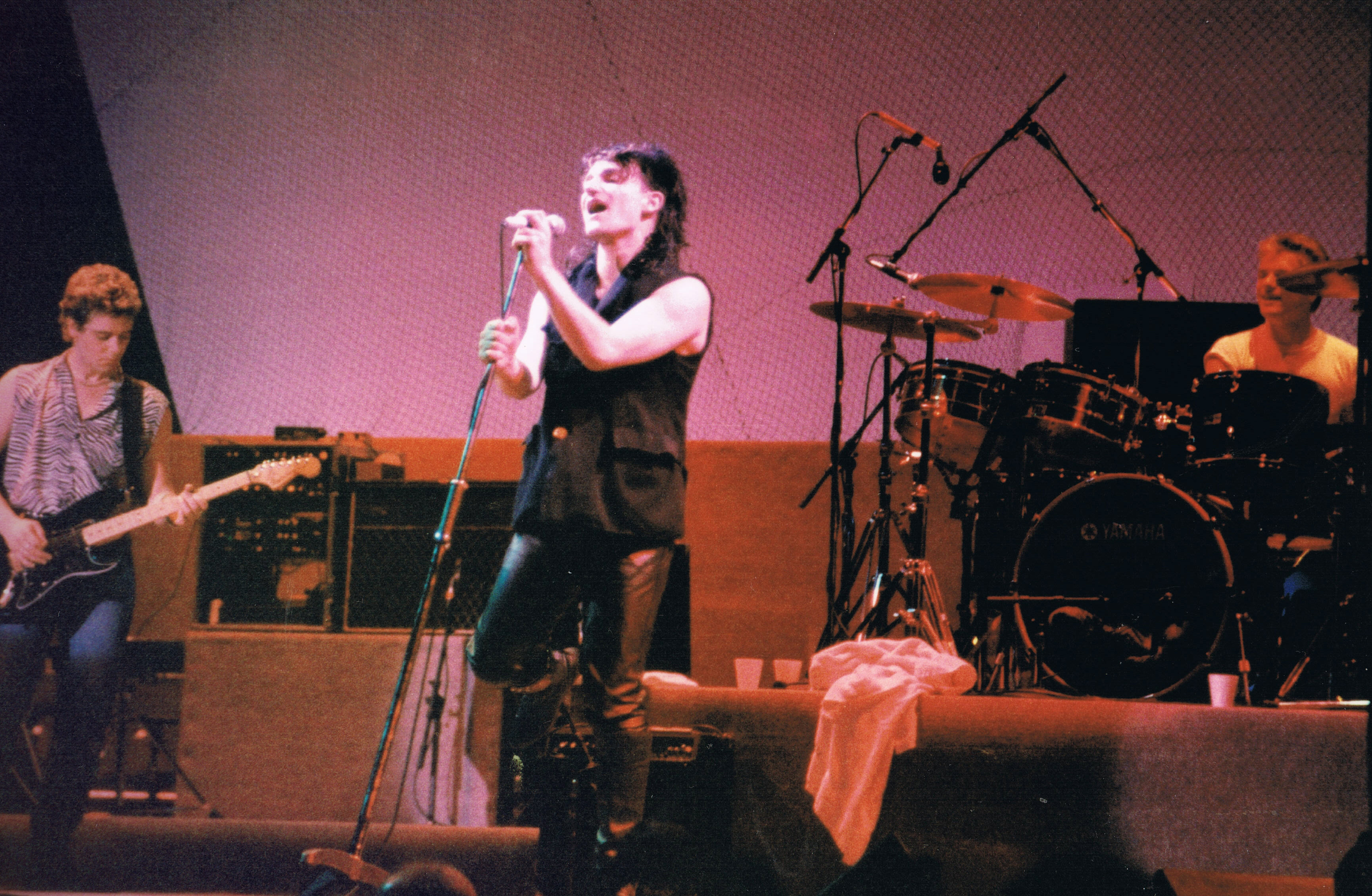
Irish band U2 topped the New Zealand chart five times during the 1980s, the most out of any artist, with "Pride (In the Name of Love)", "Where the Streets Have No Name", "One Tree Hill", "Desire", and "Angel of Harlem".

The following lists the number-one singles on the New Zealand Singles Chart during the 1980s. The source for this decade is the Recorded Music NZ chart, the chart history of which can be found on the Recorded Music NZ website or Charts.nz.

A total of 150 singles topped the chart in the 1980s, including 20 by New Zealand artists. Three artists had three or more number-one singles; the most successful was U2, who spent 19 weeks at number one with five different singles. UB40 and Stevie Wonder reached number one three times, and two New Zealand acts topped the chart more than once this decade: Jon Stevens and Tex Pistol.

Two songs spent nine weeks at number one during the 1980s. The first was "Hands Up (Give Me Your Heart)" by French pop duo Ottawan in 1981, and the second was "Sailing Away" by New Zealand supergroup All of Us in 1986. Not counting Jon Stevens' "Jezebel", which reached number one in 1979, four singles topped the chart for eight weeks this decade: "Shaddap You Face" by Joe Dolce Music Theatre, "How Great Thou Art" by Howard Morrison, "I Just Called to Say I Love You" by Stevie Wonder, and "Slice of Heaven" by Dave Dobbyn and Herbs.

Key

* – Number-one single of the year (Note: Annual charts are sourced from the RIANZ website: "Annual Top 50 Singles Chart 2010")
† – Song of New Zealand origin (Note: Whether or not a song is of New Zealand origin is determined by the RMNZ)
‡ – Number-one single of the year, of New Zealand origin

== 1980 ==
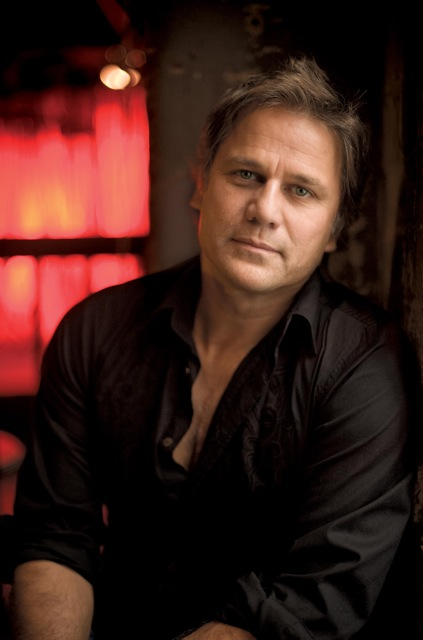
Jon Stevens replaced himself at number one when "Montego Bay" succeeded "Jezebel" at number one.

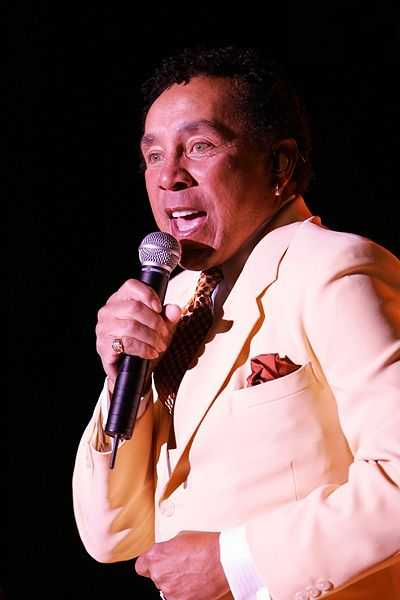
Smokey Robinson topped the New Zealand chart twice during the 1980s: "Cruisin'" in 1980 and "Being with You" in 1981.

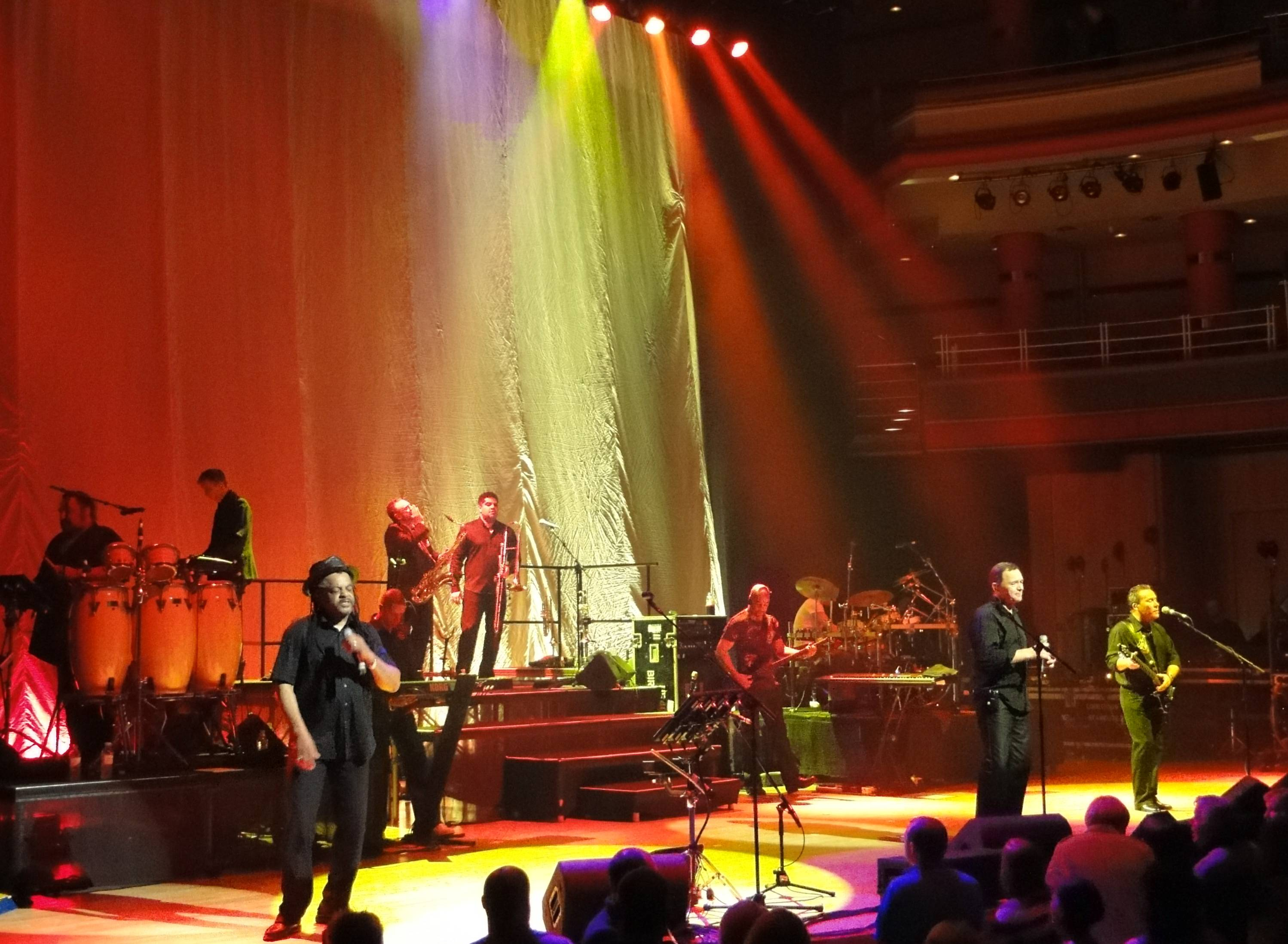
"Food for Thought", "Red Red Wine", and "I Got You Babe" gave UB40 three chart-toppers this decade.

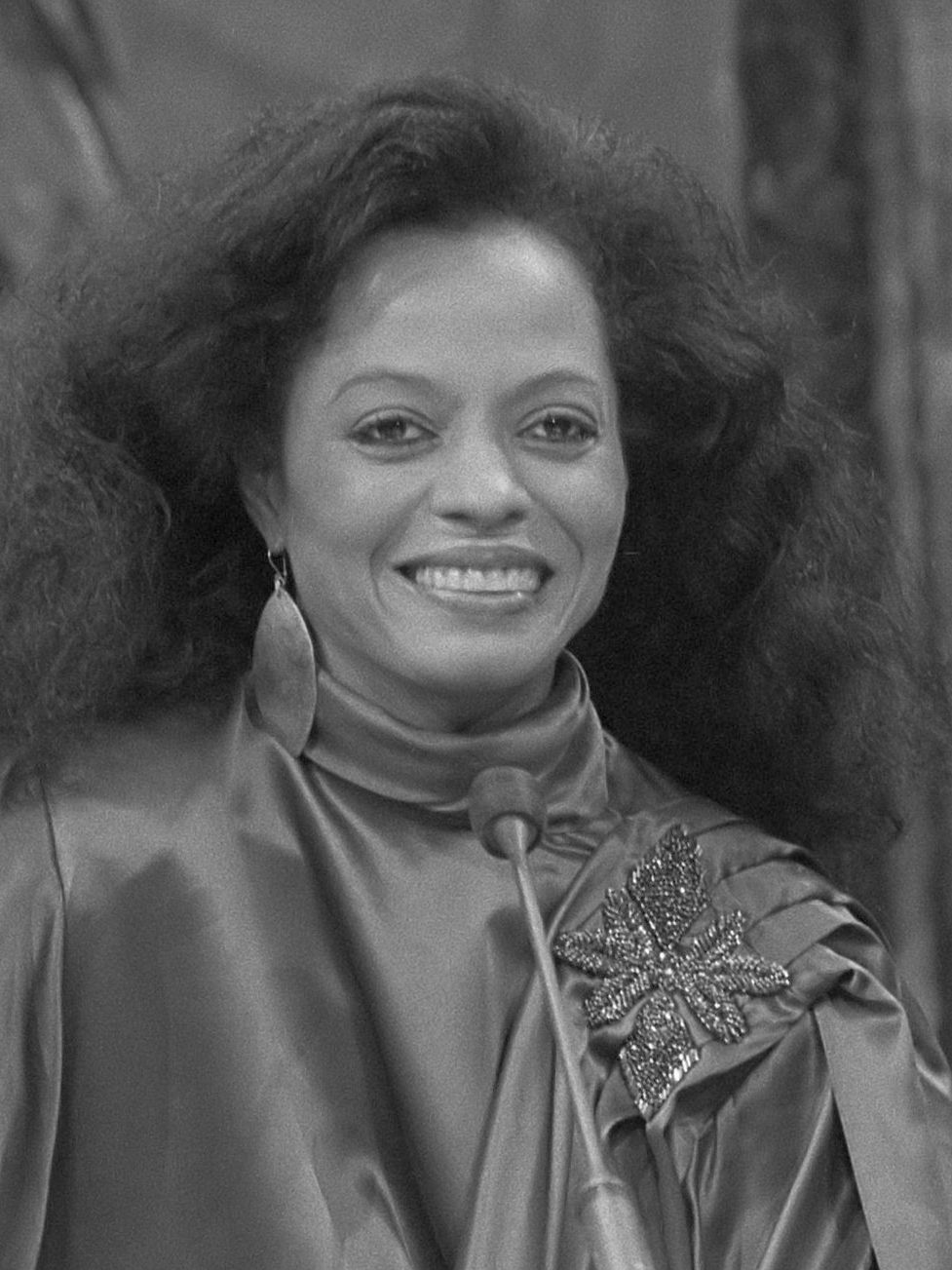
Diana Ross spent three weeks at number one with "Upside Down".

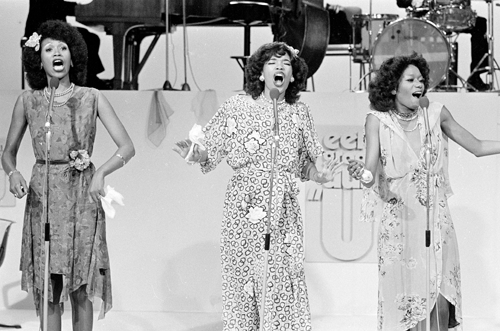
"He's So Shy" by the Pointer Sisters claimed the number-one spot for three weeks.

| Date | Artist | Single | Weeks at number one | Ref. |
|---|---|---|---|---|
| 6 January | Jon Stevens | "Jezebel" | 8 weeks (5 in 1979) | |
| 13 January | Jon Stevens | "Jezebel" | 8 weeks (5 in 1979) | |
| 20 January | Jon Stevens | "Jezebel" | 8 weeks (5 in 1979) | |
| 27 January | Jon Stevens | "Montego Bay" | 2 weeks | |
| 3 February | Jon Stevens | "Montego Bay" | 2 weeks | |
| 10 February | Pink Floyd | "Another Brick in the Wall (Part 2)" | 5 weeks | |
| 17 February | Pink Floyd | "Another Brick in the Wall (Part 2)" | 5 weeks | |
| 24 February | Pink Floyd | "Another Brick in the Wall (Part 2)" | 5 weeks | |
| 2 March | Pink Floyd | "Another Brick in the Wall (Part 2)" | 5 weeks | |
| 9 March | Pink Floyd | "Another Brick in the Wall (Part 2)" | 5 weeks | |
| 16 March | Split Enz | "I Got You" | 3 weeks | |
| 23 March | Split Enz | "I Got You" | 3 weeks | |
| 30 March | Split Enz | "I Got You" | 3 weeks | |
| 6 April | Ry Cooder | "Little Sister" | 2 weeks | |
| 13 April | Ry Cooder | "Little Sister" | 2 weeks | |
| 20 April | Smokey Robinson | "Cruisin'" | 4 weeks | |
| 27 April | Smokey Robinson | "Cruisin'" | 4 weeks | |
| 4 May | Smokey Robinson | "Cruisin'" | 4 weeks | |
| 11 May | Smokey Robinson | "Cruisin'" | 4 weeks | |
| 18 May | Dr. Hook | "Sexy Eyes" | 1 week | |
| 25 May | Peaches & Herb | "I Pledge My Love" | 1 week | |
| 1 June | The Brothers Johnson | "Stomp!" | 6 weeks | |
| 8 June | The Brothers Johnson | "Stomp!" | 6 weeks | |
| 15 June | The Brothers Johnson | "Stomp!" | 6 weeks | |
| 22 June | The Brothers Johnson | "Stomp!" | 6 weeks | |
| 29 June | The Brothers Johnson | "Stomp!" | 6 weeks | |
| 6 July | The Brothers Johnson | "Stomp!" | 6 weeks | |
| 13 July | Lipps Inc. | "Funkytown" | 1 week | |
| 20 July | Ritz | "Locomotion" | 7 weeks | |
| 27 July | Ritz | "Locomotion" | 7 weeks | |
| 3 August | Ritz | "Locomotion" | 7 weeks | |
| 10 August | Ritz | "Locomotion" | 7 weeks | |
| 17 August | Matchbox | "Rockabilly Rebel" | 1 week | |
| 24 August | Ritz | "Locomotion" | 7 weeks | |
| 31 August | Ritz | "Locomotion" | 7 weeks | |
| 7 September | Ritz | "Locomotion" | 7 weeks | |
| 14 September | UB40 | "Food for Thought" | 4 weeks | |
| 21 September | UB40 | "Food for Thought" | 4 weeks | |
| 28 September | UB40 | "Food for Thought" | 4 weeks | |
| 5 October | UB40 | "Food for Thought" | 4 weeks | |
| 12 October | Diana Ross | "Upside Down" | 3 weeks | |
| 19 October | Diana Ross | "Upside Down" | 3 weeks | |
| 26 October | Diana Ross | "Upside Down" | 3 weeks | |
| 2 November | Stevie Wonder | "Master Blaster (Jammin')" | 4 weeks | |
| 9 November | Stevie Wonder | "Master Blaster (Jammin')" | 4 weeks | |
| 16 November | Stevie Wonder | "Master Blaster (Jammin')" | 4 weeks | |
| 23 November | Stevie Wonder | "Master Blaster (Jammin')" | 4 weeks | |
| 30 November | The Pointer Sisters | "He's So Shy" | 3 weeks | |
| 7 December | The Pointer Sisters | "He's So Shy" | 3 weeks | |
| 14 December | The Pointer Sisters | "He's So Shy" | 3 weeks | |
| 21 December | Joe Dolce Music Theatre | "Shaddap You Face" | 8 weeks | |
| 28 December | Joe Dolce Music Theatre | "Shaddap You Face" | 8 weeks | |

== 1981 ==
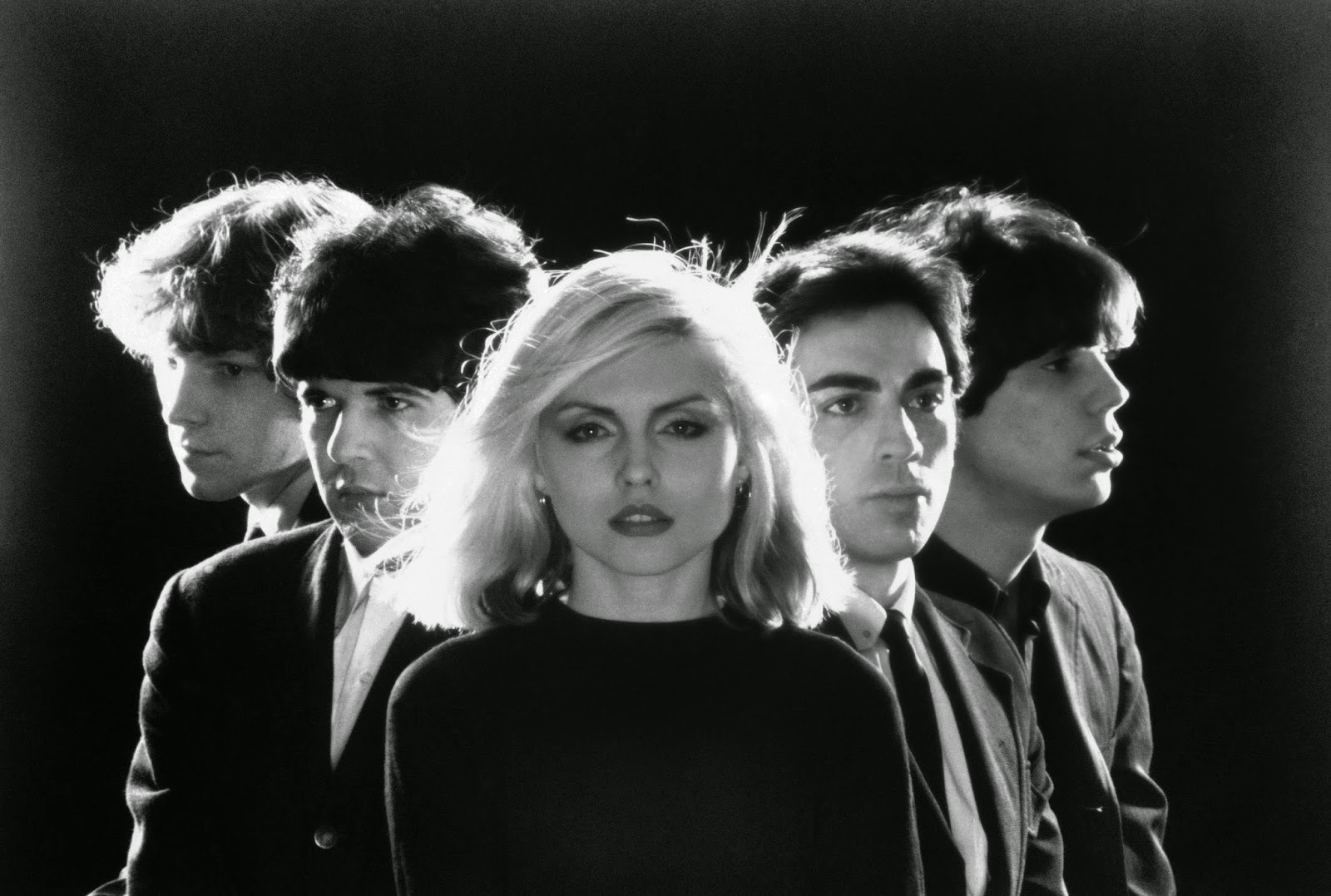
American band Blondie achieved their second and final New Zealand number one with "The Tide Is High".

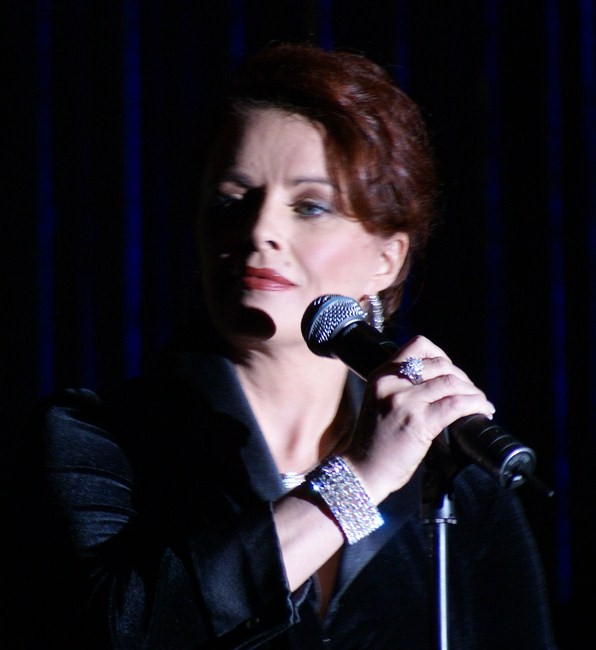
Sheena Easton reached number one for one week with "Morning Train (9 to 5)".

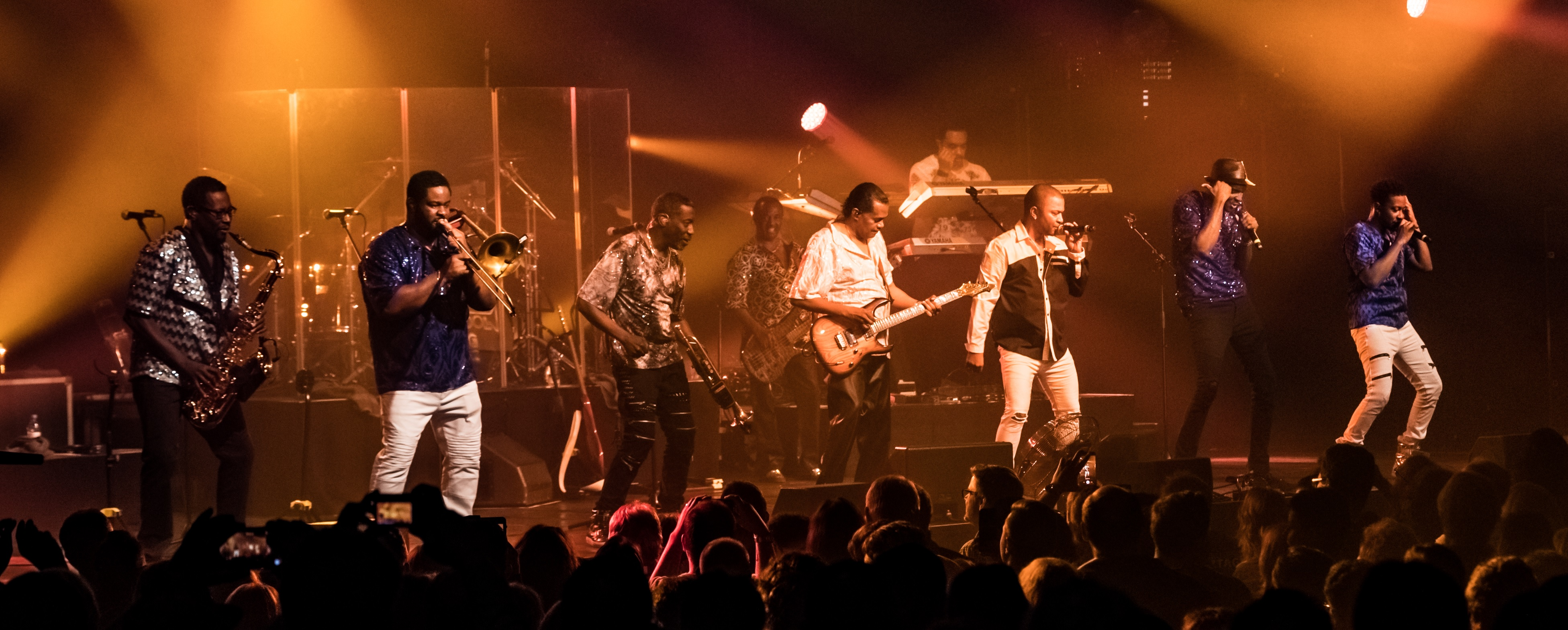
Kool & the Gang's "Celebration" topped the New Zealand chart for three nonconsecutive weeks in 1981.

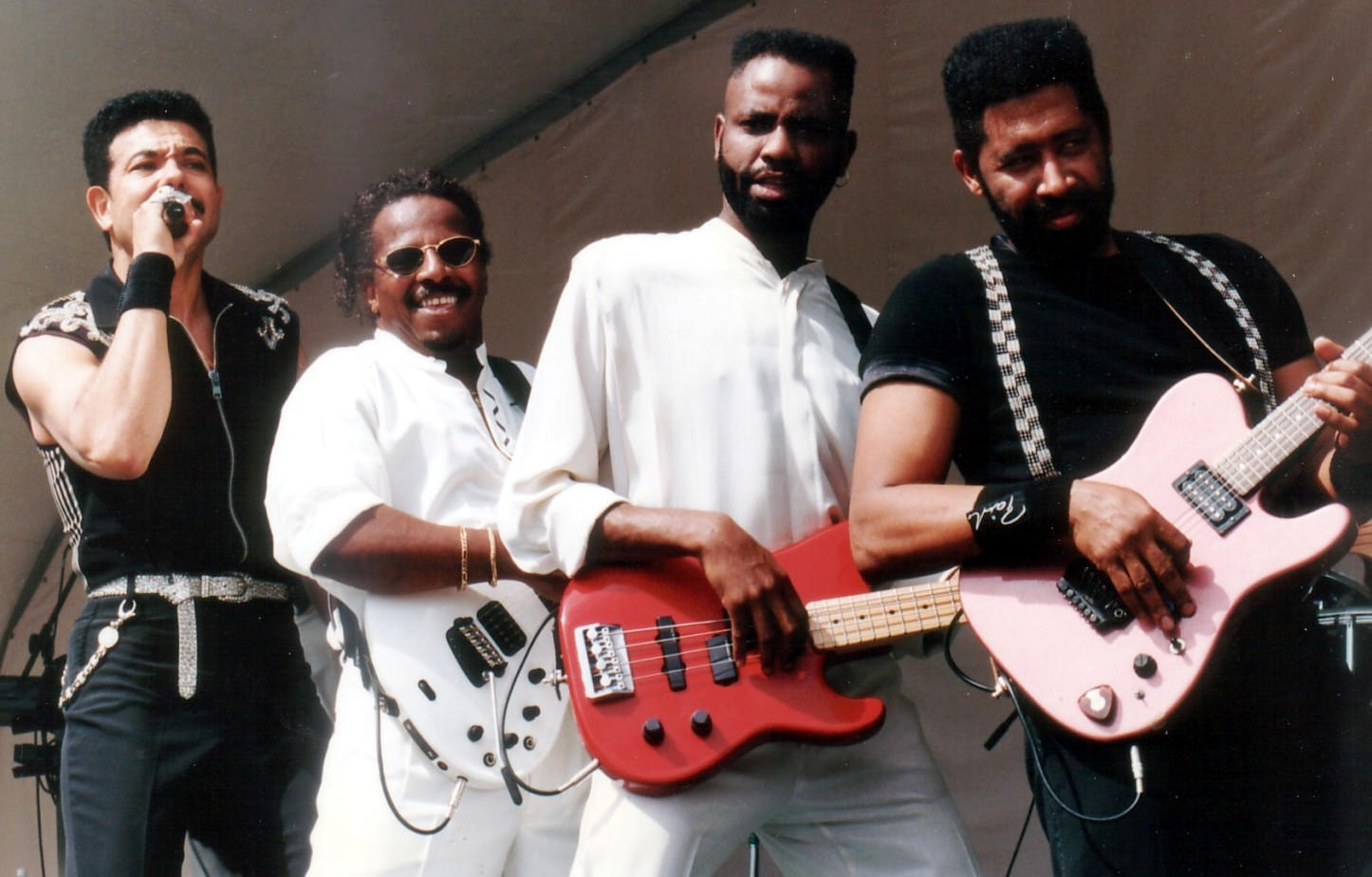
In October 1981, the Commodores peaked atop the New Zealand chart with "Lady (You Bring Me Up)". Ex-Commodore Lionel Richie would later reach number one with "Hello" in 1984.

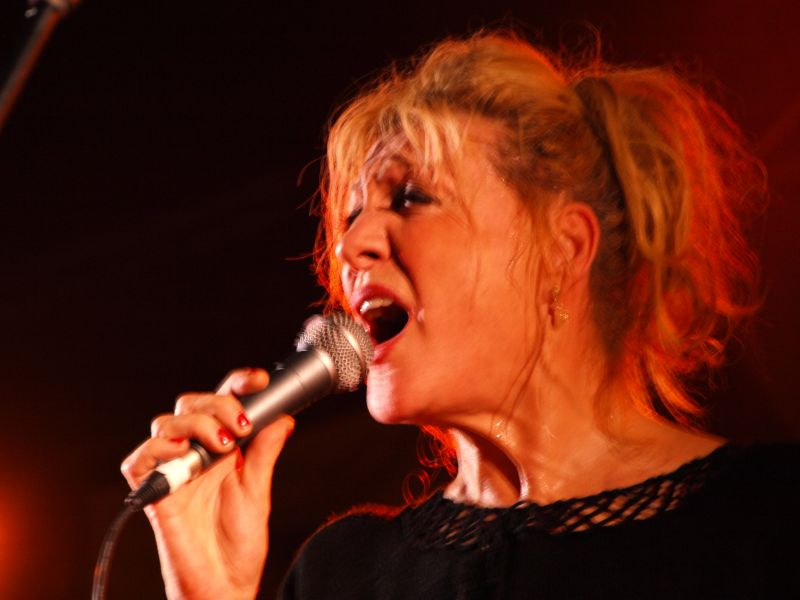
Australian singer Renée Geyer earned her only New Zealand chart-topper with "Say I Love You", which stayed five weeks at the summit.

| Date | Artist | Single | Weeks at number one | Ref. |
|---|---|---|---|---|
| 4 January | Joe Dolce Music Theatre | "Shaddap You Face" | 8 weeks | |
| 11 January | Joe Dolce Music Theatre | "Shaddap You Face" | 8 weeks | |
| 18 January | Joe Dolce Music Theatre | "Shaddap You Face" | 8 weeks | |
| 25 January | Joe Dolce Music Theatre | "Shaddap You Face" | 8 weeks | |
| 1 February | Joe Dolce Music Theatre | "Shaddap You Face" | 8 weeks | |
| 8 February | Joe Dolce Music Theatre | "Shaddap You Face" | 8 weeks | |
| 15 February | Blondie | "The Tide Is High" | 2 weeks | |
| 22 February | Blondie | "The Tide Is High" | 2 weeks | |
| 1 March | John Lennon | "Woman" | 5 weeks | |
| 8 March | John Lennon | "Woman" | 5 weeks | |
| 15 March | John Lennon | "Woman" | 5 weeks | |
| 22 March | John Lennon | "Woman" | 5 weeks | |
| 29 March | John Lennon | "Woman" | 5 weeks | |
| 5 April | Deane Waretini | "The Bridge" | 3 weeks | |
| 12 April | The Swingers | "Counting the Beat" | 3 weeks | |
| 19 April | Deane Waretini | "The Bridge" | 3 weeks | |
| 26 April | Deane Waretini | "The Bridge" | 3 weeks | |
| 3 May | The Swingers | "Counting the Beat" | 3 weeks | |
| 10 May | The Swingers | "Counting the Beat" | 3 weeks | |
| 17 May | Smokey Robinson | "Being with You" | 4 weeks | |
| 24 May | Smokey Robinson | "Being with You" | 4 weeks | |
| 31 May | Smokey Robinson | "Being with You" | 4 weeks | |
| 7 June | Smokey Robinson | "Being with You" | 4 weeks | |
| 14 June | Sheena Easton | "Morning Train (9 to 5)" | 1 week | |
| 21 June | Joy Division | "Love Will Tear Us Apart" | 1 week | |
| 28 June | Stars on 45 | "Stars on 45" | 7 weeks | |
| 5 July | Stars on 45 | "Stars on 45" | 7 weeks | |
| 12 July | Stars on 45 | "Stars on 45" | 7 weeks | |
| 19 July | Stars on 45 | "Stars on 45" | 7 weeks | |
| 26 July | Stars on 45 | "Stars on 45" | 7 weeks | |
| 2 August | Stars on 45 | "Stars on 45" | 7 weeks | |
| 9 August | Stars on 45 | "Stars on 45" | 7 weeks | |
| 16 August | Joy Division | "Atmosphere" | 1 week | |
| 23 August | Kool & the Gang | "Celebration" | 3 weeks | |
| 30 August | Screaming Meemees | "See Me Go" | 1 week | |
| 6 September | Kool & the Gang | "Celebration" | 3 weeks | |
| 13 September | Kool & the Gang | "Celebration" | 3 weeks | |
| 20 September | Billy Field | "Bad Habits" | 2 weeks | |
| 27 September | Billy Field | "Bad Habits" | 2 weeks | |
| 4 October | Commodores | "Lady (You Bring Me Up)" | 1 week | |
| 11 October | Joey Scarbury | "Theme from The Greatest American Hero (Believe It or Not)" | 3 weeks | |
| 18 October | Joey Scarbury | "Theme from The Greatest American Hero (Believe It or Not)" | 3 weeks | |
| 25 October | Joey Scarbury | "Theme from The Greatest American Hero (Believe It or Not)" | 3 weeks | |
| 1 November | Renée Geyer | "Say I Love You" | 5 weeks | |
| 8 November | Renée Geyer | "Say I Love You" | 5 weeks | |
| 15 November | Renée Geyer | "Say I Love You" | 5 weeks | |
| 22 November | Renée Geyer | "Say I Love You" | 5 weeks | |
| 29 November | Renée Geyer | "Say I Love You" | 5 weeks | |
| 6 December | Olivia Newton-John | "Physical" | 3 weeks | |
| 13 December | Olivia Newton-John | "Physical" | 3 weeks | |
| 20 December | Howard Morrison | "How Great Thou Art" | 8 weeks | |
| 27 December | Howard Morrison | "How Great Thou Art" | 8 weeks | |

== 1982 ==
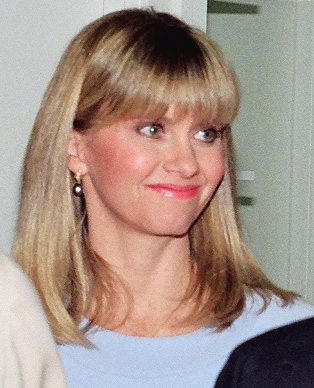
"Physical" by Olivia Newton-John spent three weeks at number one in 1981 and 1982.

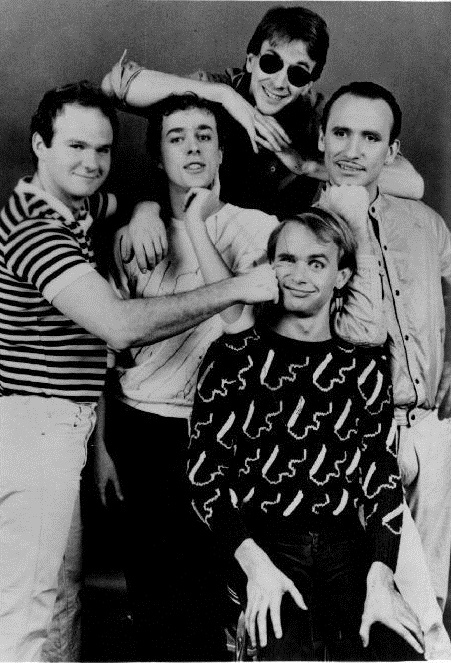
Men at Work peaked at number one for two weeks with "Down Under".

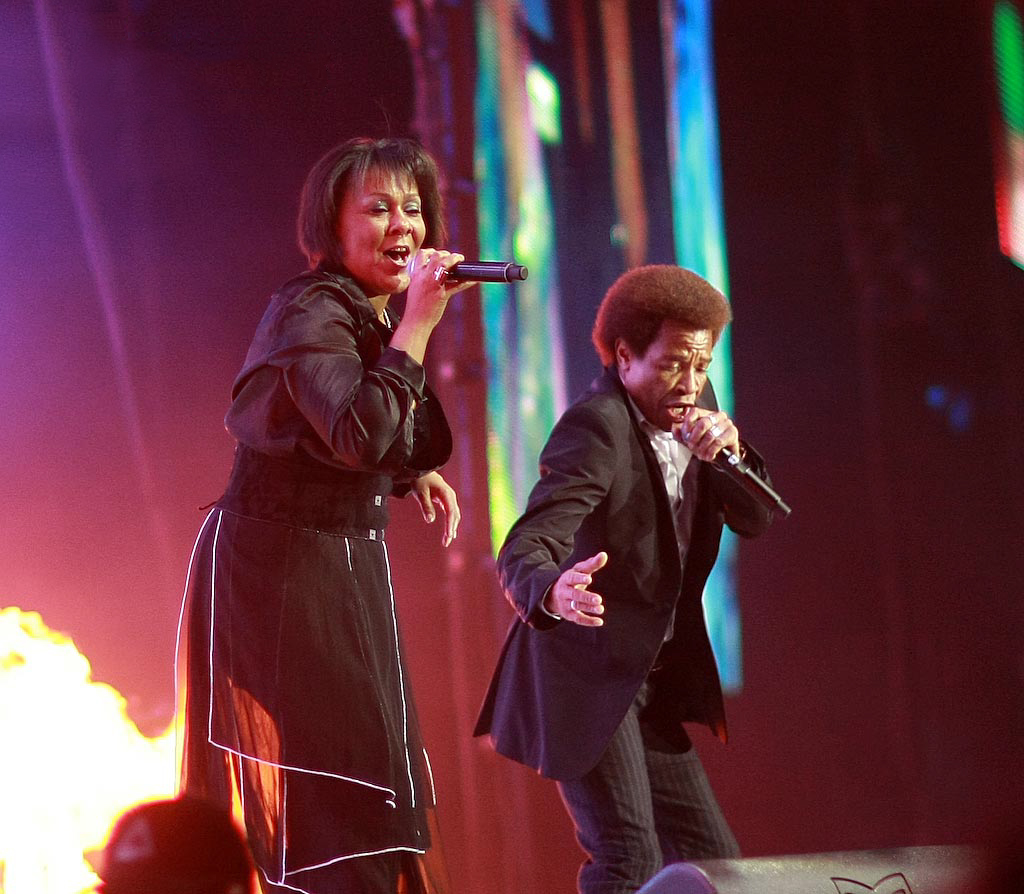
French disco duo Ottawan spent nine weeks at number one with "Hands Up (Give Me Your Heart)", the most out of any act during the 1980s.

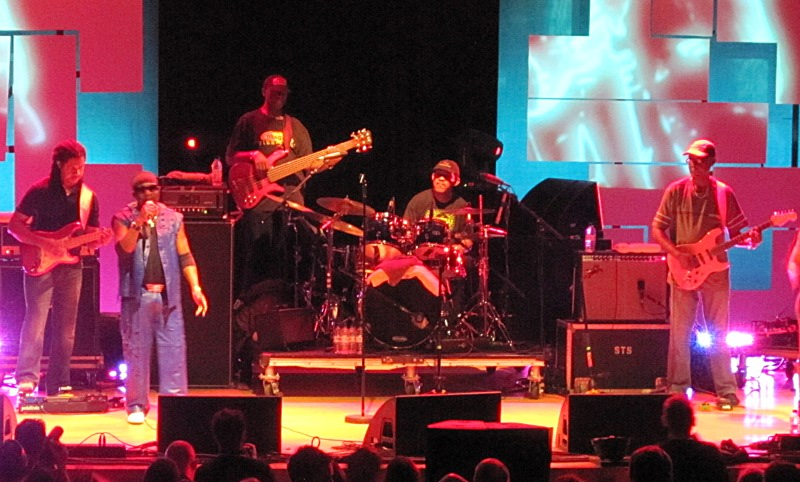
Jamaican band Toots and the Maytals had the most successful single of 1982 with "Beautiful Woman", a five-week chart-topper.

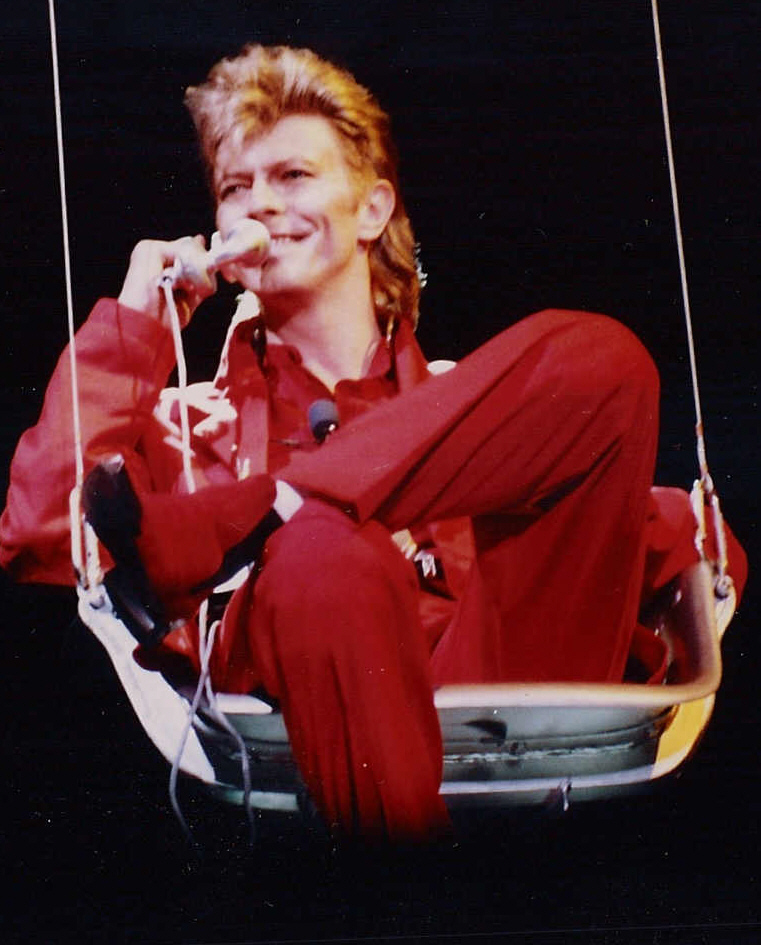
David Bowie peaked atop the New Zealand chart with "Cat People (Putting Out Fire)" in 1982 and "Let's Dance" in 1983.

| Date | Artist | Single | Weeks at number one | Ref. |
|---|---|---|---|---|
| 3 January | Howard Morrison | "How Great Thou Art" | 8 weeks | |
| 10 January | Howard Morrison | "How Great Thou Art" | 8 weeks | |
| 17 January | Howard Morrison | "How Great Thou Art" | 8 weeks | |
| 24 January | Olivia Newton-John | "Physical" | 3 weeks | |
| 31 January | Howard Morrison | "How Great Thou Art" | 8 weeks | |
| 7 February | Dave Stewart and Barbara Gaskin | "It's My Party" | 1 week | |
| 14 February | Howard Morrison | "How Great Thou Art" | 8 weeks | |
| 21 February | Men at Work | "Down Under" | 2 weeks | |
| 28 February | Howard Morrison | "How Great Thou Art" | 8 weeks | |
| 7 March | Men at Work | "Down Under" | 2 weeks | |
| 14 March | Ottawan | "Hands Up (Give Me Your Heart)" | 9 weeks | |
| 21 March | Ottawan | "Hands Up (Give Me Your Heart)" | 9 weeks | |
| 28 March | Ottawan | "Hands Up (Give Me Your Heart)" | 9 weeks | |
| 4 April | Ottawan | "Hands Up (Give Me Your Heart)" | 9 weeks | |
| 11 April | Ottawan | "Hands Up (Give Me Your Heart)" | 9 weeks | |
| 18 April | Ottawan | "Hands Up (Give Me Your Heart)" | 9 weeks | |
| 25 April | Ottawan | "Hands Up (Give Me Your Heart)" | 9 weeks | |
| 2 May | Ottawan | "Hands Up (Give Me Your Heart)" | 9 weeks | |
| 9 May | Ottawan | "Hands Up (Give Me Your Heart)" | 9 weeks | |
| 16 May | The Human League | "Don't You Want Me" | 5 weeks | |
| 23 May | The Human League | "Don't You Want Me" | 5 weeks | |
| 30 May | The Human League | "Don't You Want Me" | 5 weeks | |
| 6 June | The Human League | "Don't You Want Me" | 5 weeks | |
| 13 June | The Human League | "Don't You Want Me" | 5 weeks | |
| 20 June | Joan Jett & the Blackhearts | "I Love Rock 'n' Roll" | 4 weeks | |
| 27 June | Joan Jett & the Blackhearts | "I Love Rock 'n' Roll" | 4 weeks | |
| 4 July | Joan Jett & the Blackhearts | "I Love Rock 'n' Roll" | 4 weeks | |
| 11 July | Joan Jett & the Blackhearts | "I Love Rock 'n' Roll" | 4 weeks | |
| 18 July | Prince Tui Teka | "E Ipo" | 2 weeks | |
| 25 July | Prince Tui Teka | "E Ipo" | 2 weeks | |
| 1 August | Toots and the Maytals | "Beautiful Woman" | 5 weeks | |
| 8 August | Toots and the Maytals | "Beautiful Woman" | 5 weeks | |
| 15 August | Toots and the Maytals | "Beautiful Woman" | 5 weeks | |
| 22 August | Toots and the Maytals | "Beautiful Woman" | 5 weeks | |
| 29 August | Toots and the Maytals | "Beautiful Woman" | 5 weeks | |
| 5 September | David Bowie | "Cat People (Putting Out Fire)" | 3 weeks | |
| 12 September | David Bowie | "Cat People (Putting Out Fire)" | 3 weeks | |
| 19 September | David Bowie | "Cat People (Putting Out Fire)" | 3 weeks | |
| 26 September | Irene Cara | "Fame" | 3 weeks | |
| 3 October | Irene Cara | "Fame" | 3 weeks | |
| 10 October | Irene Cara | "Fame" | 3 weeks | |
| 17 October | Trio | "Da Da Da" | 3 weeks | |
| 24 October | Trio | "Da Da Da" | 3 weeks | |
| 31 October | Trio | "Da Da Da" | 3 weeks | |
| 7 November | Dexys Midnight Runners | "Come On Eileen" | 4 weeks | |
| 14 November | Dexys Midnight Runners | "Come On Eileen" | 4 weeks | |
| 21 November | Dexys Midnight Runners | "Come On Eileen" | 4 weeks | |
| 28 November | Dexys Midnight Runners | "Come On Eileen" | 4 weeks | |
| 5 December | Musical Youth | "Pass the Dutchie" | 7 weeks | |
| 12 December | Musical Youth | "Pass the Dutchie" | 7 weeks | |
| 19 December | Musical Youth | "Pass the Dutchie" | 7 weeks | |
| 26 December | Musical Youth | "Pass the Dutchie" | 7 weeks | |

== 1983 ==
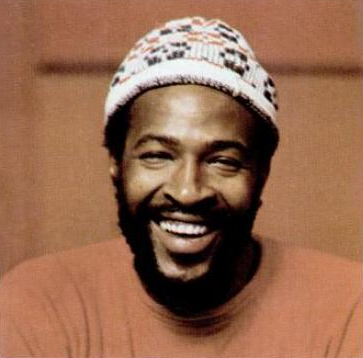
"Sexual Healing" by Marvin Gaye spent six weeks at number one in early 1983.

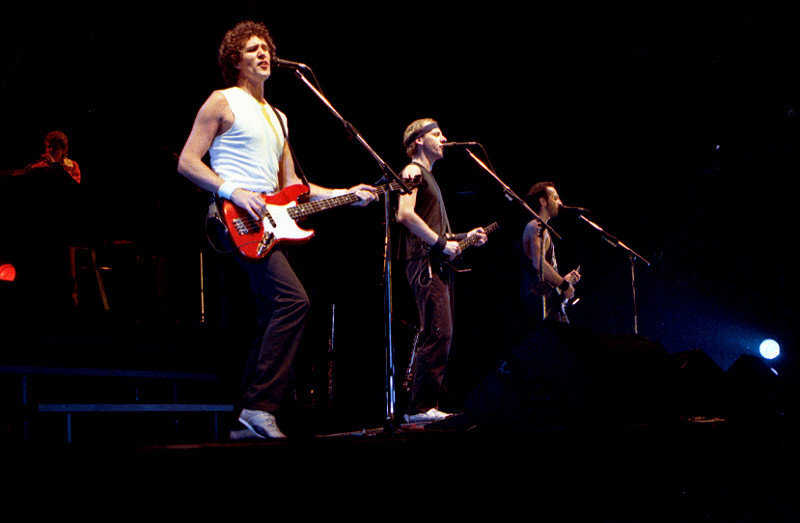
Dire Straits earned their only New Zealand number one with "Twisting by the Pool".

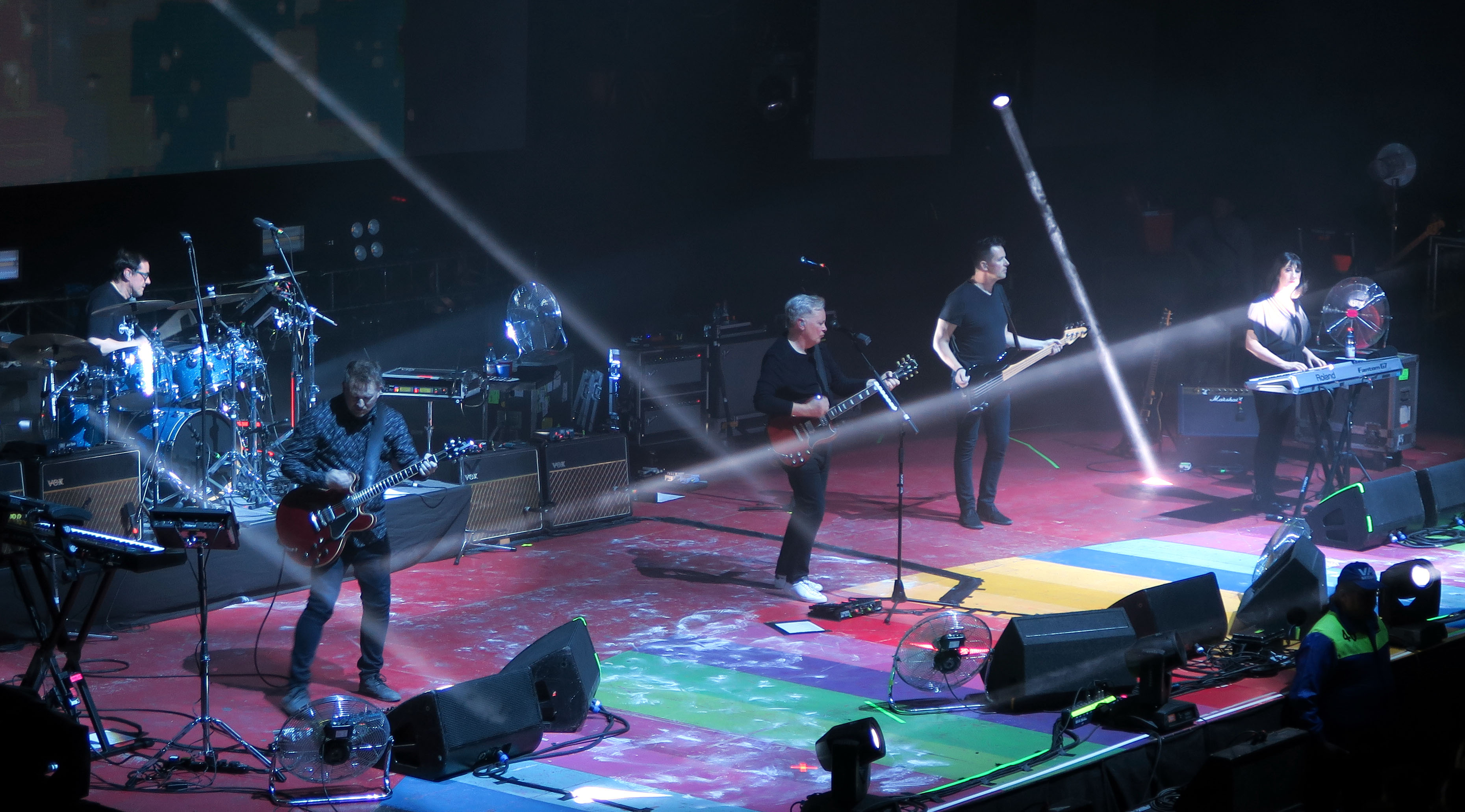
Despite peaking at number two with "Blue Monday", 1983's highest-selling single, New Order would attain the top spot with "Blue Monday 1988" five years later.

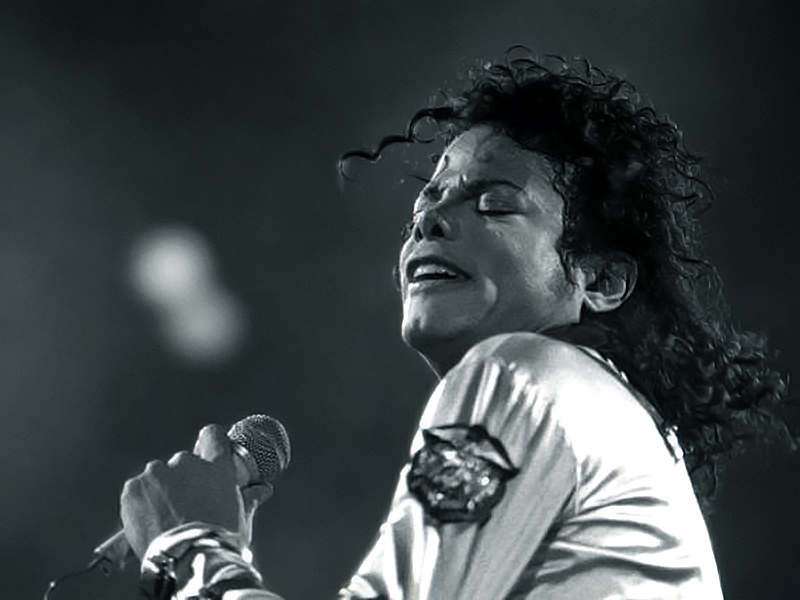
Michael Jackson achieved his only New Zealand number-one single during the 1980s with "Beat It", which was number one for five weeks.

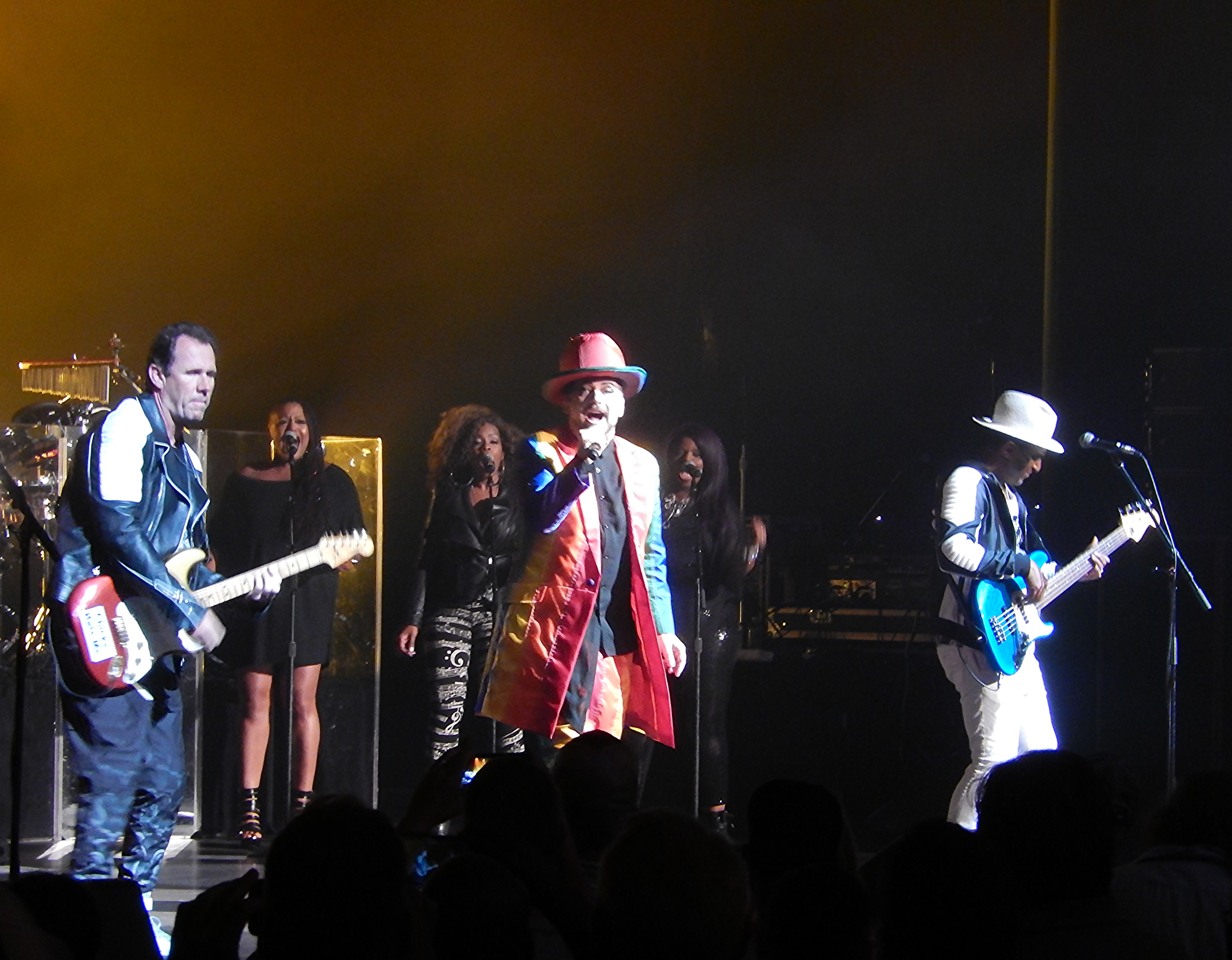
"Karma Chameleon" by Culture Club spent six weeks at number one in late 1983.

| Date | Artist | Single | Weeks at number one | Ref. |
|---|---|---|---|---|
| 2 January | Musical Youth | "Pass the Dutchie" | 7 weeks | |
| 9 January | Musical Youth | "Pass the Dutchie" | 7 weeks | |
| 16 January | Musical Youth | "Pass the Dutchie" | 7 weeks | |
| 23 January | Marvin Gaye | "Sexual Healing" | 6 weeks | |
| 30 January | Marvin Gaye | "Sexual Healing" | 6 weeks | |
| 6 February | Marvin Gaye | "Sexual Healing" | 6 weeks | |
| 13 February | Marvin Gaye | "Sexual Healing" | 6 weeks | |
| 20 February | Marvin Gaye | "Sexual Healing" | 6 weeks | |
| 27 February | Marvin Gaye | "Sexual Healing" | 6 weeks | |
| 6 March | Eddy Grant | "I Don't Wanna Dance" | 2 weeks | |
| 13 March | Eddy Grant | "I Don't Wanna Dance" | 2 weeks | |
| 20 March | Dire Straits | "Twisting by the Pool" | 5 weeks | |
| 27 March | Dire Straits | "Twisting by the Pool" | 5 weeks | |
| 3 April | Dire Straits | "Twisting by the Pool" | 5 weeks | |
| 10 April | Dire Straits | "Twisting by the Pool" | 5 weeks | |
| 17 April | Dire Straits | "Twisting by the Pool" | 5 weeks | |
| 24 April | David Bowie | "Let's Dance" | 5 weeks | |
| 1 May | David Bowie | "Let's Dance" | 5 weeks | |
| 8 May | David Bowie | "Let's Dance" | 5 weeks | |
| 15 May | David Bowie | "Let's Dance" | 5 weeks | |
| 22 May | David Bowie | "Let's Dance" | 5 weeks | |
| 29 May | Michael Jackson | "Beat It" | 5 weeks | |
| 5 June | Michael Jackson | "Beat It" | 5 weeks | |
| 12 June | Michael Jackson | "Beat It" | 5 weeks | |
| 19 June | Michael Jackson | "Beat It" | 5 weeks | |
| 26 June | Michael Jackson | "Beat It" | 5 weeks | |
| 3 July | Bonnie Tyler | "Total Eclipse of the Heart" | 4 weeks | |
| 10 July | Bonnie Tyler | "Total Eclipse of the Heart" | 4 weeks | |
| 17 July | Bonnie Tyler | "Total Eclipse of the Heart" | 4 weeks | |
| 24 July | Bonnie Tyler | "Total Eclipse of the Heart" | 4 weeks | |
| 31 July | Irene Cara | "Flashdance... What a Feeling" | 6 weeks | |
| 7 August | Irene Cara | "Flashdance... What a Feeling" | 6 weeks | |
| 14 August | Irene Cara | "Flashdance... What a Feeling" | 6 weeks | |
| 21 August | Irene Cara | "Flashdance... What a Feeling" | 6 weeks | |
| 28 August | Irene Cara | "Flashdance... What a Feeling" | 6 weeks | |
| 4 September | Irene Cara | "Flashdance... What a Feeling" | 6 weeks | |
| 11 September | Dave and the Dynamos | "Life Begins at Forty" | 3 weeks | |
| 18 September | Dave and the Dynamos | "Life Begins at Forty" | 3 weeks | |
| 25 September | Dave and the Dynamos | "Life Begins at Forty" | 3 weeks | |
| 2 October | Real Life | "Send Me an Angel" | 1 week | |
| 9 October | Taco | "Puttin' On the Ritz" | 2 weeks | |
| 16 October | Taco | "Puttin' On the Ritz" | 2 weeks | |
| 23 October | UB40 | "Red Red Wine" | 1 week | |
| 30 October | Culture Club | "Karma Chameleon" | 6 weeks | |
| 6 November | Culture Club | "Karma Chameleon" | 6 weeks | |
| 13 November | Culture Club | "Karma Chameleon" | 6 weeks | |
| 20 November | Culture Club | "Karma Chameleon" | 6 weeks | |
| 27 November | Culture Club | "Karma Chameleon" | 6 weeks | |
| 4 December | Culture Club | "Karma Chameleon" | 6 weeks | |
| 11 December | Billy Joel | "Uptown Girl" | 7 weeks | |
| 18 December | Billy Joel | "Uptown Girl" | 7 weeks | |
| 25 December | Billy Joel | "Uptown Girl" | 7 weeks | |

Note: The highest-selling single of New Zealand in 1983 was New Order's "Blue Monday", which peaked at number two for two weeks behind Michael Jackson's "Beat It".

== 1984 ==
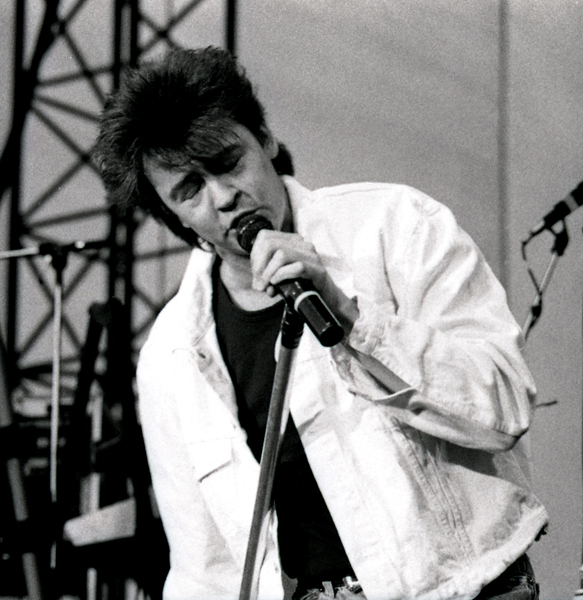
Paul Young reached the number-one position with "Come Back and Stay" in January 1984.

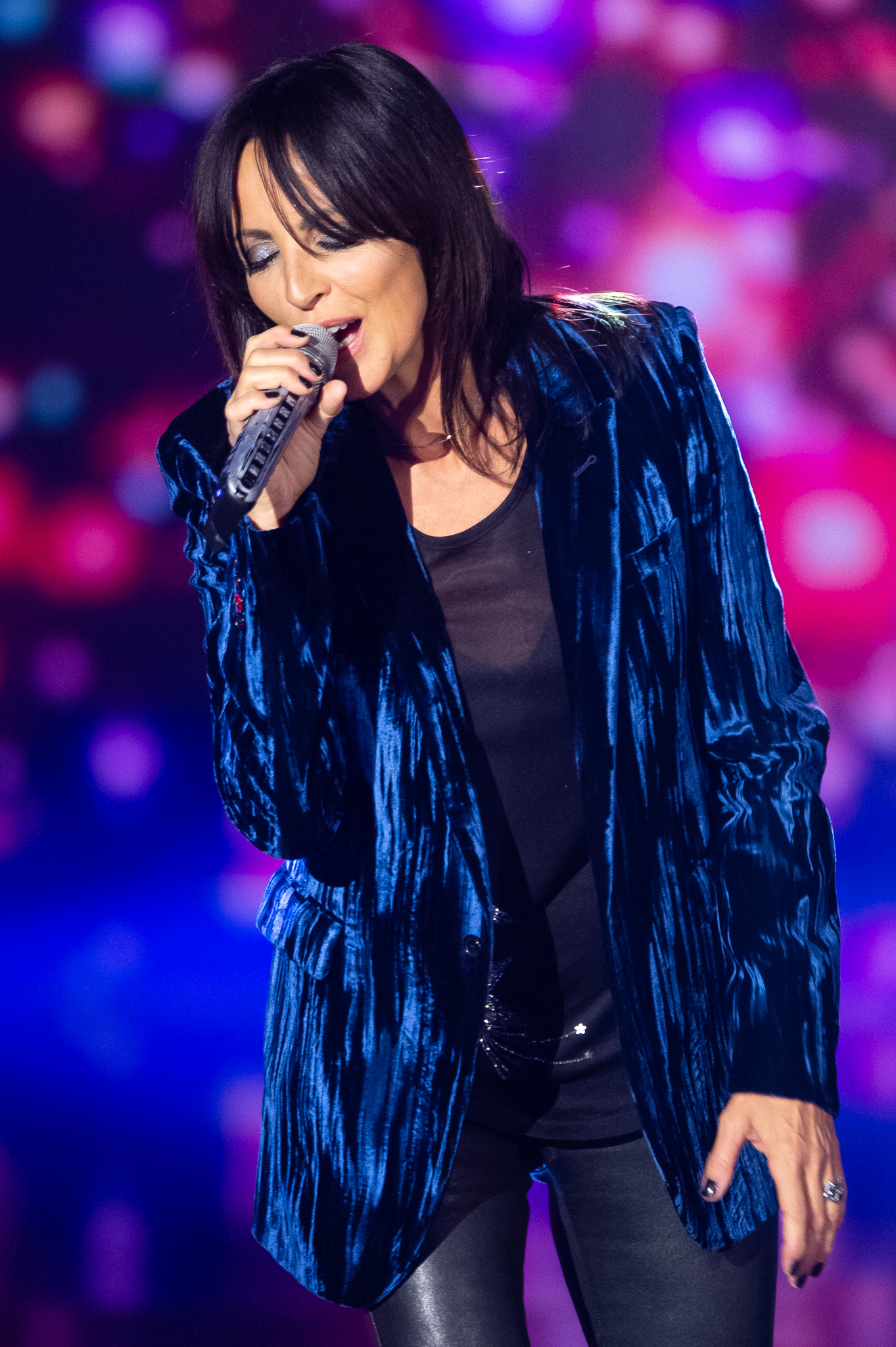
With her band of the same name, German singer Nena topped the New Zealand chart for one week with "99 Luftballons".

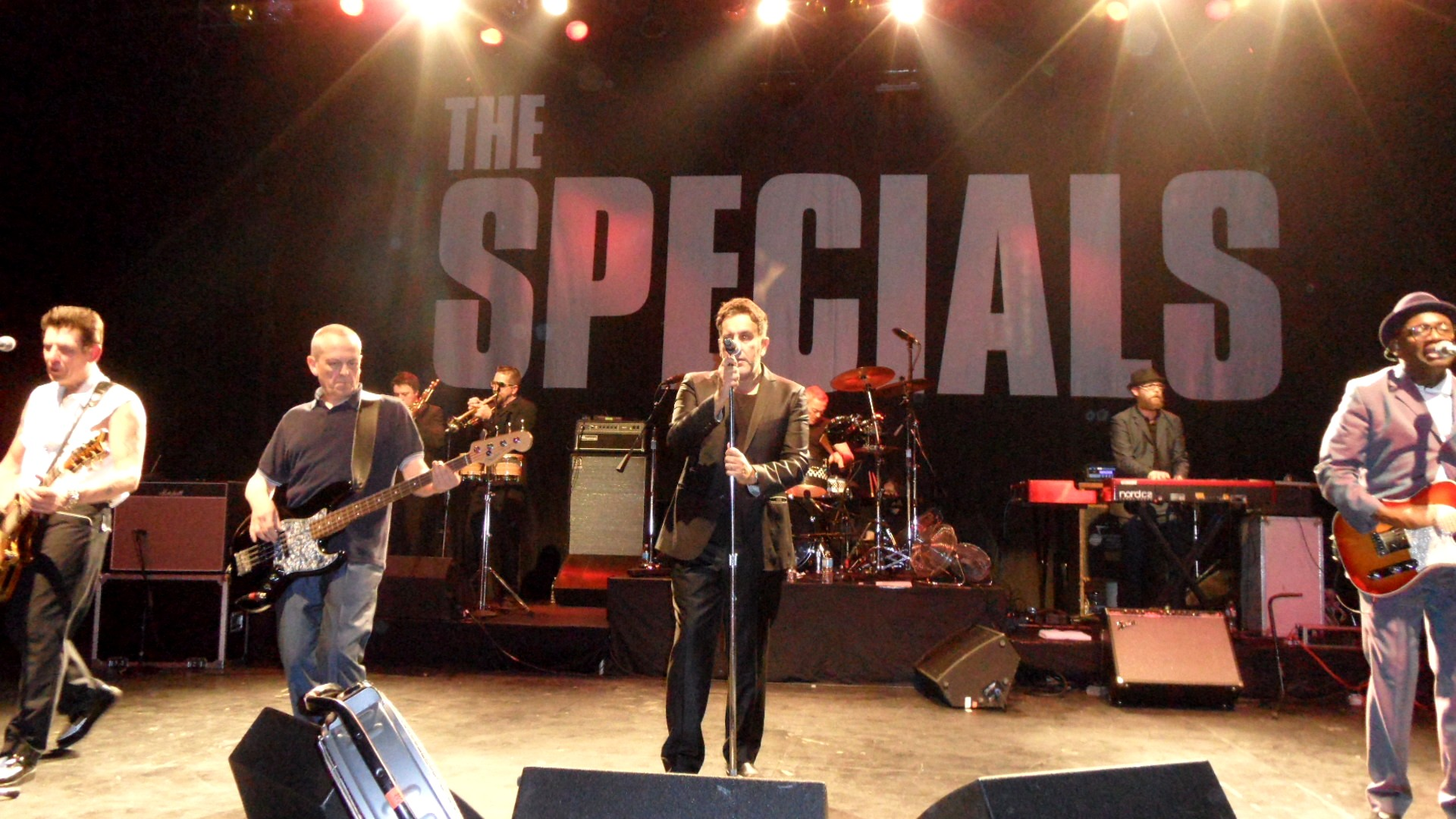
English ska band the Special A.K.A. spent three weeks at number one with the protest song "Nelson Mandela".

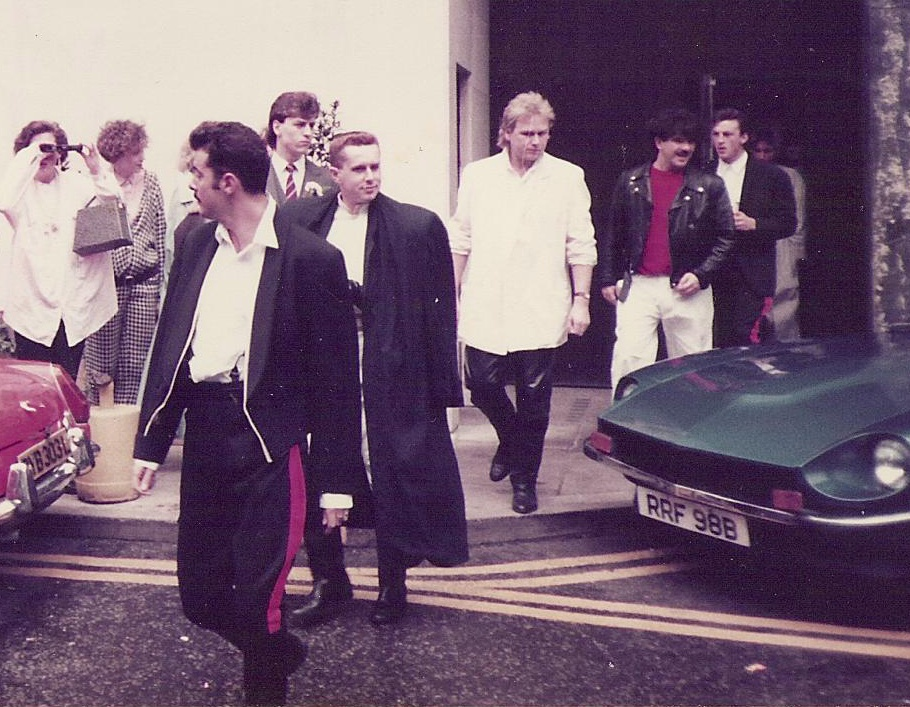
"Two Tribes" gave Frankie Goes to Hollywood their first and only New Zealand number-one hit.

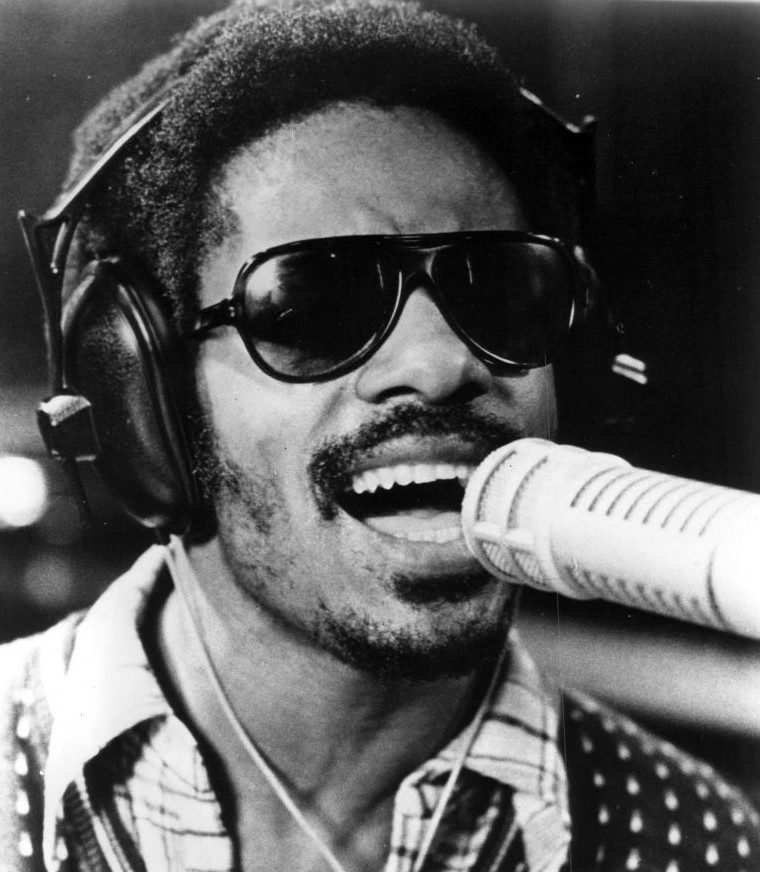
Stevie Wonder remained at the top position for eight weeks in late 1983 with "I Just Called to Say I Love You". "Master Blaster (Jammin')" and "Part-Time Lover" also reached number one.

| Date | Artist | Single | Weeks at number one | Ref. |
|---|---|---|---|---|
| 1 January | Billy Joel | "Uptown Girl" | 7 weeks | |
| 8 January | Billy Joel | "Uptown Girl" | 7 weeks | |
| 15 January | Billy Joel | "Uptown Girl" | 7 weeks | |
| 22 January | Billy Joel | "Uptown Girl" | 7 weeks | |
| 29 January | Paul Young | "Come Back and Stay" | 1 week | |
| 5 February | Simple Minds | "Waterfront" | 2 weeks | |
| 12 February | Simple Minds | "Waterfront" | 2 weeks | |
| 19 February | Foster and Allen | "Maggie" | 4 weeks | |
| 26 February | Foster and Allen | "Maggie" | 4 weeks | |
| 4 March | Foster and Allen | "Maggie" | 4 weeks | |
| 11 March | Foster and Allen | "Maggie" | 4 weeks | |
| 18 March | Patea Maori Club | "Poi E" | 4 weeks | |
| 25 March | Patea Maori Club | "Poi E" | 4 weeks | |
| 1 April | Patea Maori Club | "Poi E" | 4 weeks | |
| 8 April | Patea Maori Club | "Poi E" | 4 weeks | |
| 15 April | Nena | "99 Luftballons" | 1 week | |
| 22 April | Jimmy Cliff | "Reggae Night" | 2 weeks | |
| 29 April | Jimmy Cliff | "Reggae Night" | 2 weeks | |
| 6 May | Cyndi Lauper | "Girls Just Want to Have Fun" | 3 weeks | |
| 13 May | Cyndi Lauper | "Girls Just Want to Have Fun" | 3 weeks | |
| 20 May | Cyndi Lauper | "Girls Just Want to Have Fun" | 3 weeks | |
| 27 May | Lionel Richie | "Hello" | 1 week | |
| 3 June | Kenny Loggins | "Footloose" | 4 weeks | |
| 10 June | Kenny Loggins | "Footloose" | 4 weeks | |
| 17 June | Kenny Loggins | "Footloose" | 4 weeks | |
| 24 June | Kenny Loggins | "Footloose" | 4 weeks | |
| 1 July | Time Bandits | "I'm Only Shooting Love" | 1 week | |
| 8 July | The Special A.K.A. | "Nelson Mandela" | 3 weeks | |
| 15 July | The Special A.K.A. | "Nelson Mandela" | 3 weeks | |
| 22 July | The Special A.K.A. | "Nelson Mandela" | 3 weeks | |
| 29 July | Bob Marley and the Wailers | "One Love/People Get Ready" | 7 weeks | |
| 5 August | Bob Marley and the Wailers | "One Love/People Get Ready" | 7 weeks | |
| 12 August | Bob Marley and the Wailers | "One Love/People Get Ready" | 7 weeks | |
| 19 August | Bob Marley and the Wailers | "One Love/People Get Ready" | 7 weeks | |
| 26 August | Bob Marley and the Wailers | "One Love/People Get Ready" | 7 weeks | |
| 2 September | Bob Marley and the Wailers | "One Love/People Get Ready" | 7 weeks | |
| 9 September | Bob Marley and the Wailers | "One Love/People Get Ready" | 7 weeks | |
| 16 September | Frankie Goes to Hollywood | "Two Tribes" | 3 weeks | |
| 23 September | Frankie Goes to Hollywood | "Two Tribes" | 3 weeks | |
| 30 September | Frankie Goes to Hollywood | "Two Tribes" | 3 weeks | |
| 7 October | U2 | "Pride (In the Name of Love)" | 1 week | |
| 14 October | Stevie Wonder | "I Just Called to Say I Love You" | 8 weeks | |
| 21 October | Stevie Wonder | "I Just Called to Say I Love You" | 8 weeks | |
| 28 October | Stevie Wonder | "I Just Called to Say I Love You" | 8 weeks | |
| 4 November | Stevie Wonder | "I Just Called to Say I Love You" | 8 weeks | |
| 11 November | Stevie Wonder | "I Just Called to Say I Love You" | 8 weeks | |
| 18 November | Stevie Wonder | "I Just Called to Say I Love You" | 8 weeks | |
| 25 November | Stevie Wonder | "I Just Called to Say I Love You" | 8 weeks | |
| 2 December | Stevie Wonder | "I Just Called to Say I Love You" | 8 weeks | |
| 9 December | Billy Ocean | "Caribbean Queen (No More Love on the Run)" | 6 weeks | |
| 16 December | Billy Ocean | "Caribbean Queen (No More Love on the Run)" | 6 weeks | |
| 23 December | Billy Ocean | "Caribbean Queen (No More Love on the Run)" | 6 weeks | |
| 30 December | Billy Ocean | "Caribbean Queen (No More Love on the Run)" | 6 weeks | |

== 1985 ==
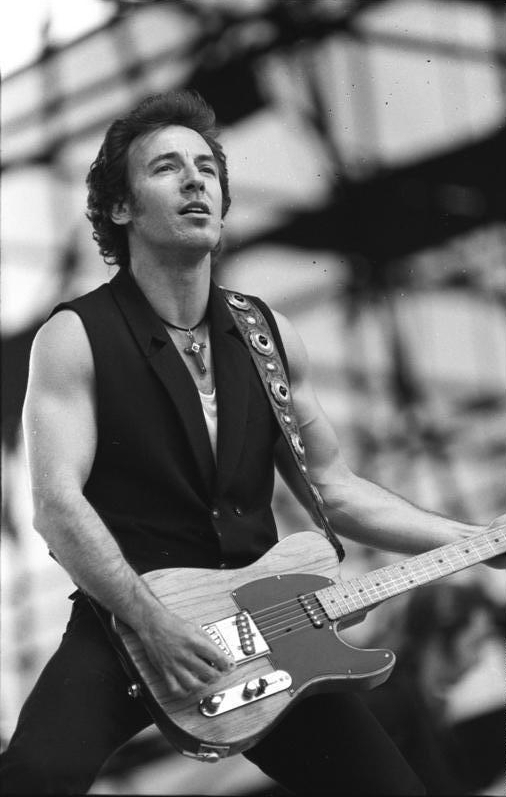
Bruce Springsteen's "Born in the U.S.A." gave him his highest-peaking hit in New Zealand when it topped the chart in February 1985.

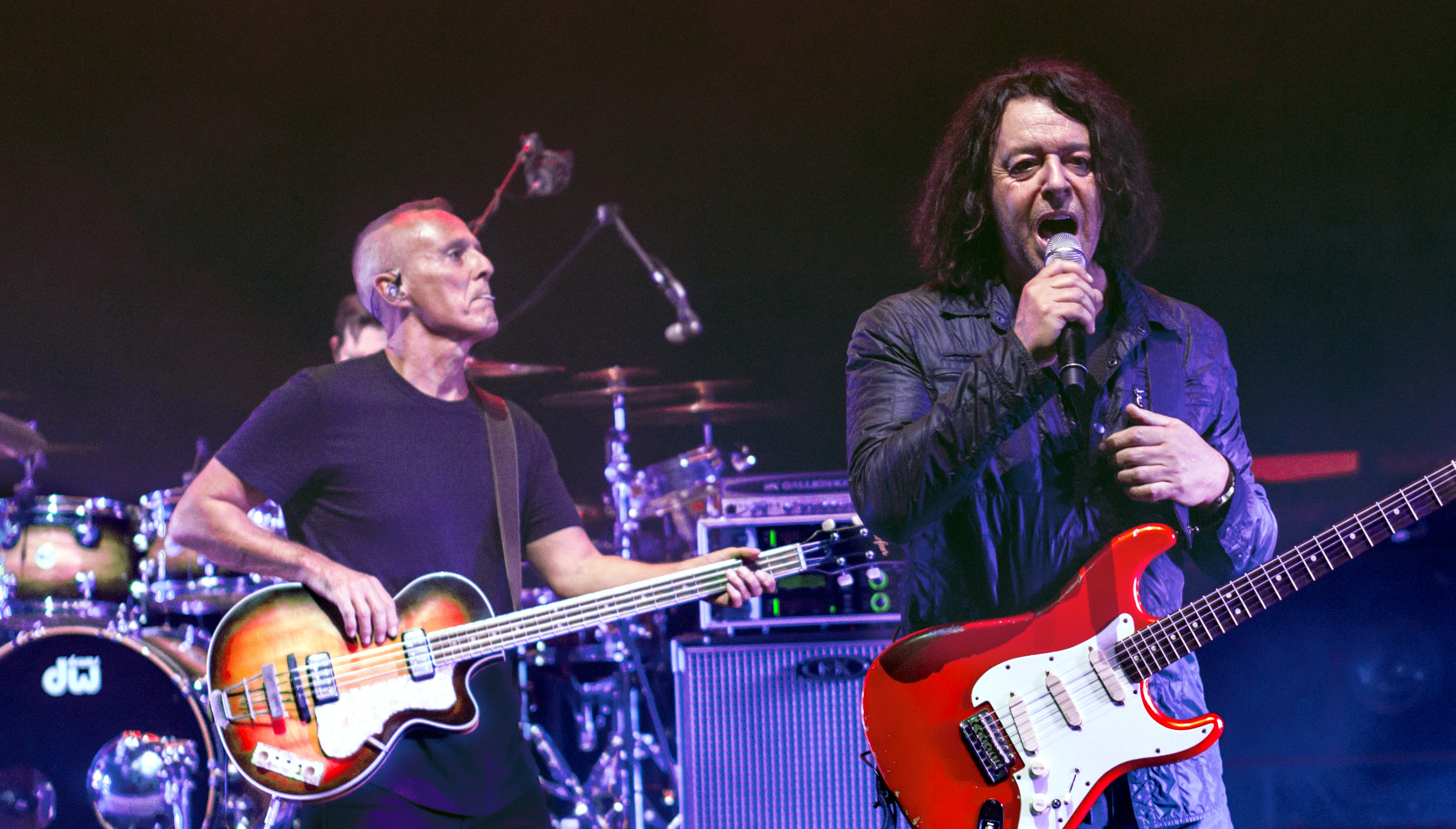
Two singles by Tears for Fears reached number one in New Zealand in 1985: "Shout" and "Everybody Wants to Rule the World".

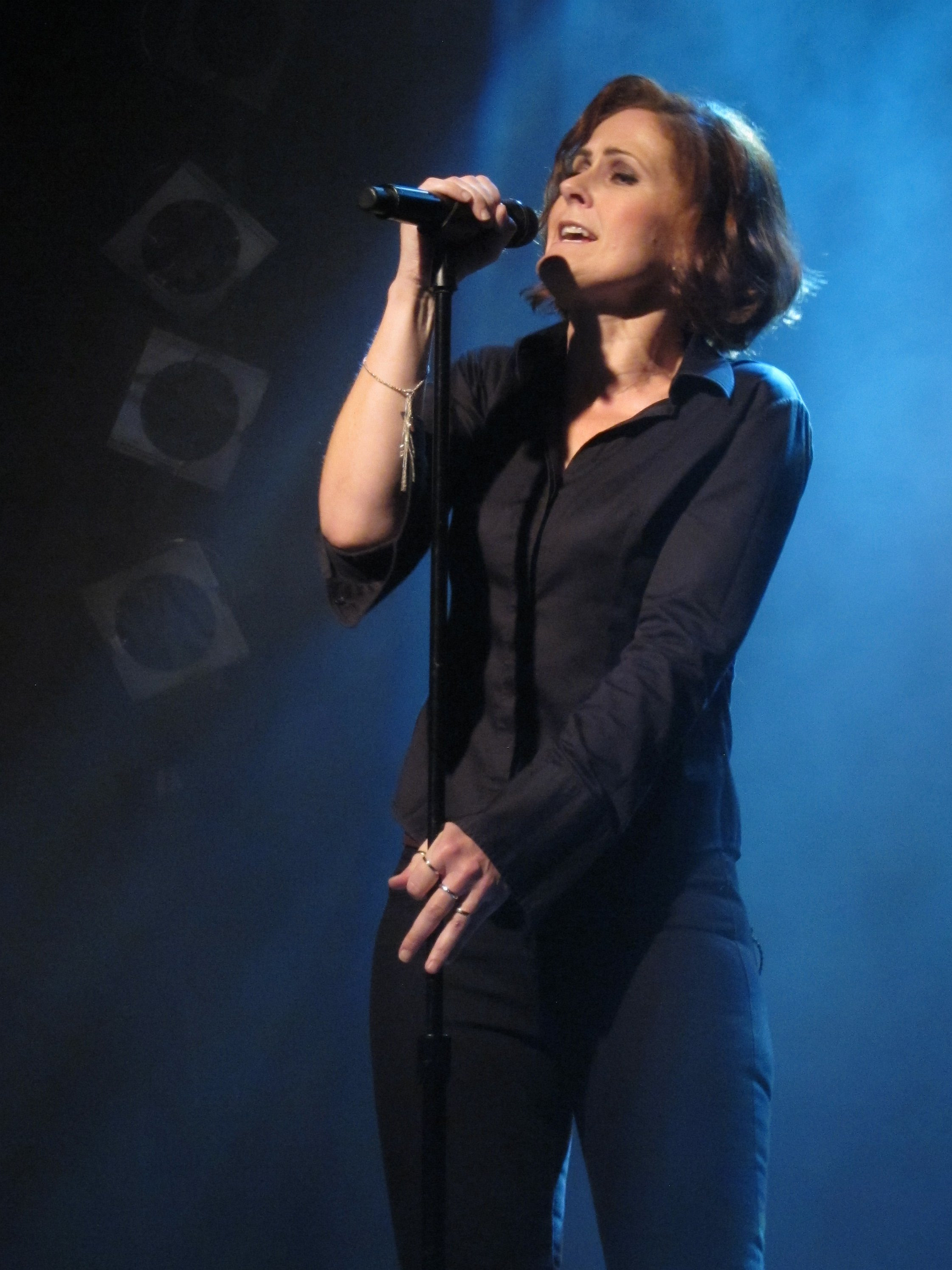
English singer Alison Moyet topped the New Zealand chart for three weeks with her recording of "That Ole Devil Called Love".

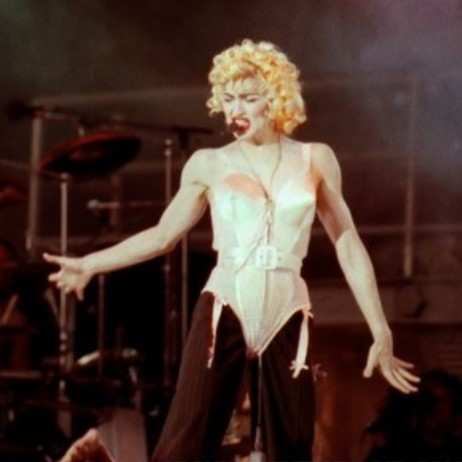
Madonna picked up her first two New Zealand number-one singles during the 1980s: "Into the Groove" in 1985 and "Like a Prayer" in 1989.

| Date | Artist | Single | Weeks at number one | Ref. |
|---|---|---|---|---|
| 6 January | Billy Ocean | "Caribbean Queen (No More Love on the Run)" | 6 weeks | |
| 13 January | Billy Ocean | "Caribbean Queen (No More Love on the Run)" | 6 weeks | |
| 20 January | Band Aid | "Do They Know It's Christmas?" | 4 weeks | |
| 27 January | Band Aid | "Do They Know It's Christmas?" | 4 weeks | |
| 3 February | Band Aid | "Do They Know It's Christmas?" | 4 weeks | |
| 10 February | Band Aid | "Do They Know It's Christmas?" | 4 weeks | |
| 17 February | Foreigner | "I Want to Know What Love Is" | 3 weeks | |
| 24 February | Bruce Springsteen | "Born in the U.S.A." | 1 week | |
| 3 March | Foreigner | "I Want to Know What Love Is" | 3 weeks | |
| 10 March | Foreigner | "I Want to Know What Love Is" | 3 weeks | |
| 17 March | Ashford & Simpson | "Solid" | 2 weeks | |
| 24 March | Ashford & Simpson | "Solid" | 2 weeks | |
| 31 March | Tears for Fears | "Shout" | 3 weeks | |
| 7 April | Tears for Fears | "Shout" | 3 weeks | |
| 14 April | Tears for Fears | "Shout" | 3 weeks | |
| 21 April | USA for Africa | "We Are the World" | 7 weeks | |
| 28 April | USA for Africa | "We Are the World" | 7 weeks | |
| 5 May | USA for Africa | "We Are the World" | 7 weeks | |
| 12 May | USA for Africa | "We Are the World" | 7 weeks | |
| 19 May | USA for Africa | "We Are the World" | 7 weeks | |
| 26 May | USA for Africa | "We Are the World" | 7 weeks | |
| 2 June | USA for Africa | "We Are the World" | 7 weeks | |
| 9 June | Tears for Fears | "Everybody Wants to Rule the World" | 1 week | |
| 16 June | Alison Moyet | "That Ole Devil Called Love" | 3 weeks | |
| 23 June | Alison Moyet | "That Ole Devil Called Love" | 3 weeks | |
| 30 June | Alison Moyet | "That Ole Devil Called Love" | 3 weeks | |
| 7 July | Paul Hardcastle | "19" | 5 weeks | |
| 14 July | Paul Hardcastle | "19" | 5 weeks | |
| 21 July | Paul Hardcastle | "19" | 5 weeks | |
| 28 July | Paul Hardcastle | "19" | 5 weeks | |
| 4 August | Paul Hardcastle | "19" | 5 weeks | |
| 11 August | Madonna | "Into the Groove" | 6 weeks | |
| 18 August | Madonna | "Into the Groove" | 6 weeks | |
| 25 August | Madonna | "Into the Groove" | 6 weeks | |
| 1 September | Madonna | "Into the Groove" | 6 weeks | |
| 8 September | Madonna | "Into the Groove" | 6 weeks | |
| 15 September | Madonna | "Into the Groove" | 6 weeks | |
| 22 September | UB40 and Chrissie Hynde | "I Got You Babe" | 6 weeks | |
| 29 September | UB40 and Chrissie Hynde | "I Got You Babe" | 6 weeks | |
| 6 October | UB40 and Chrissie Hynde | "I Got You Babe" | 6 weeks | |
| 13 October | UB40 and Chrissie Hynde | "I Got You Babe" | 6 weeks | |
| 20 October | UB40 and Chrissie Hynde | "I Got You Babe" | 6 weeks | |
| 27 October | UB40 and Chrissie Hynde | "I Got You Babe" | 6 weeks | |
| 3 November | Stevie Wonder | "Part-Time Lover" | 2 weeks | |
| 10 November | Stevie Wonder | "Part-Time Lover" | 2 weeks | |
| 17 November | Jennifer Rush | "The Power of Love" | 4 weeks | |
| 24 November | Jennifer Rush | "The Power of Love" | 4 weeks | |
| 1 December | Jennifer Rush | "The Power of Love" | 4 weeks | |
| 8 December | Jennifer Rush | "The Power of Love" | 4 weeks | |
| 15 December | Peking Man | "Room That Echoes" | 6 weeks | |
| 22 December | Peking Man | "Room That Echoes" | 6 weeks | |
| 29 December | Peking Man | "Room That Echoes" | 6 weeks | |

== 1986 ==
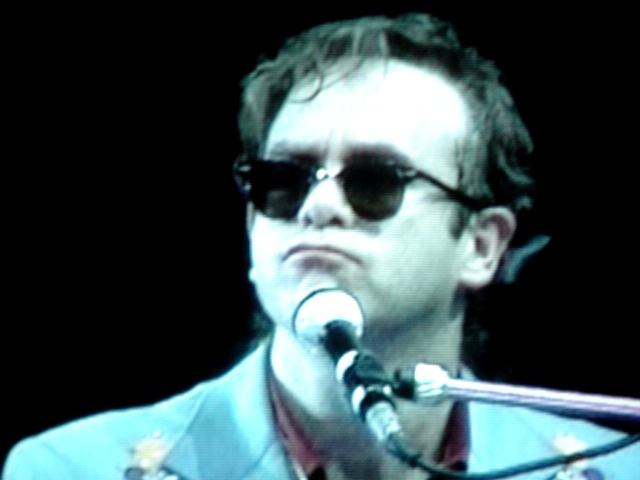
Elton John earned his fourth New Zealand number-one single with "Nikita" in January and February 1986.

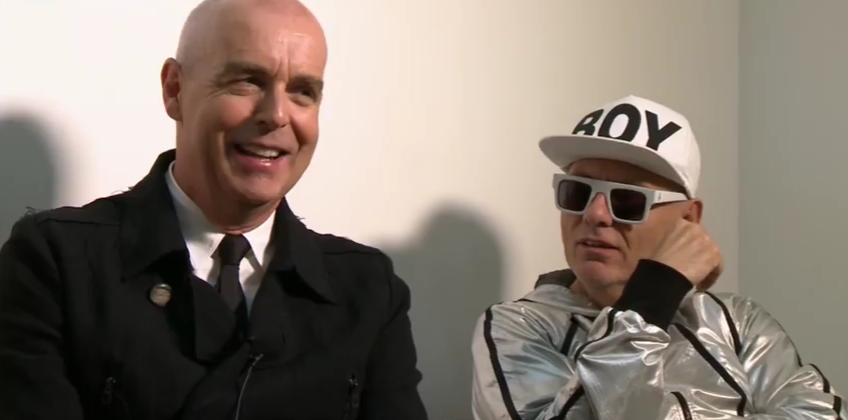
"West End Girls" and "Heart" by Pet Shop Boys spent a combined total of five weeks at number one in 1986 and 1988, respectively.

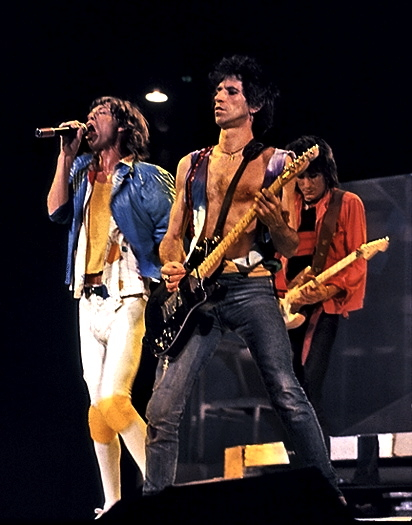
The Rolling Stones' rendition of "Harlem Shuffle" spent a week at number one in April 1986.

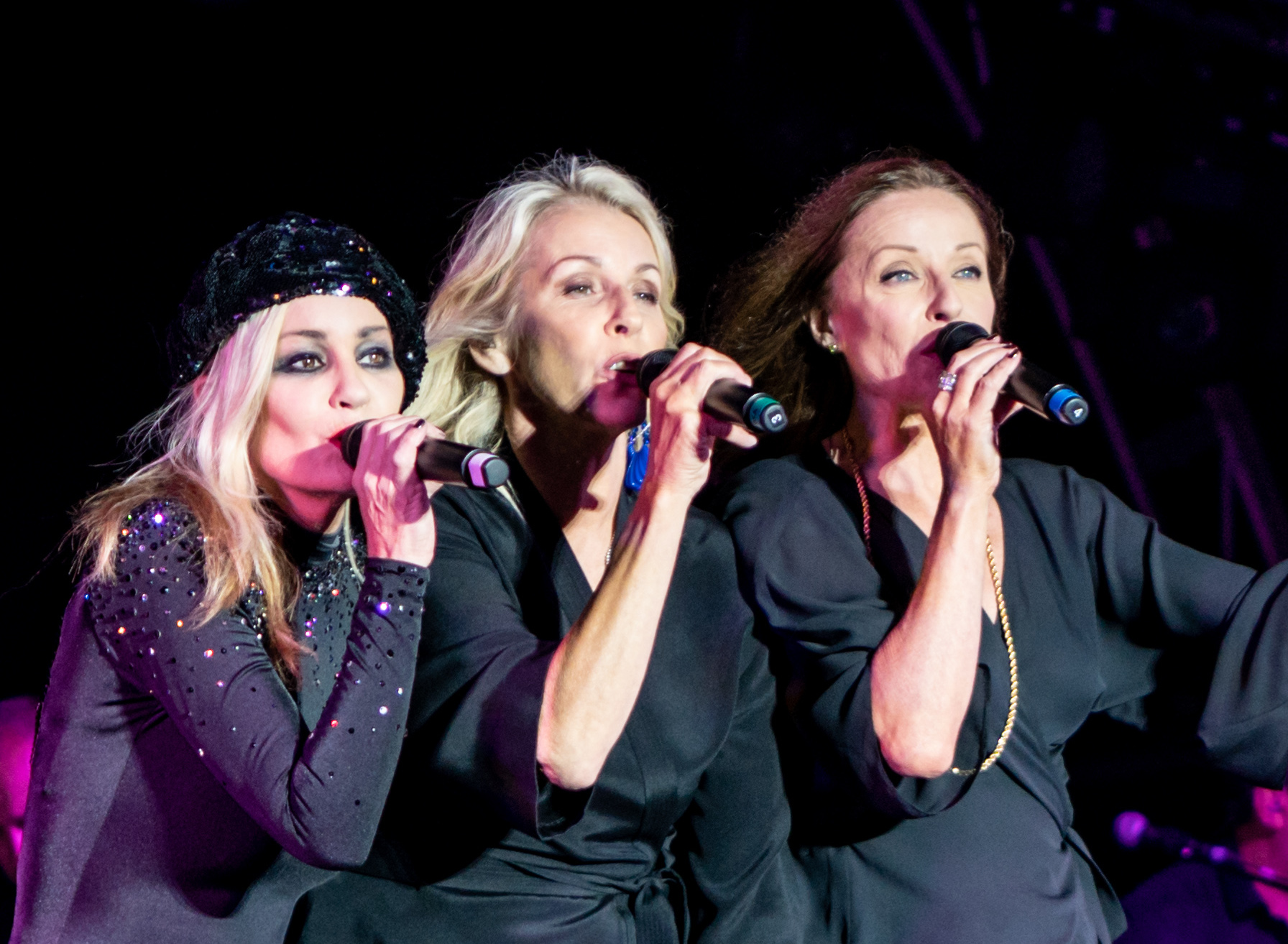
"Venus" by Bananarama topped the New Zealand Singles Chart for all four chart weeks of September 1986.

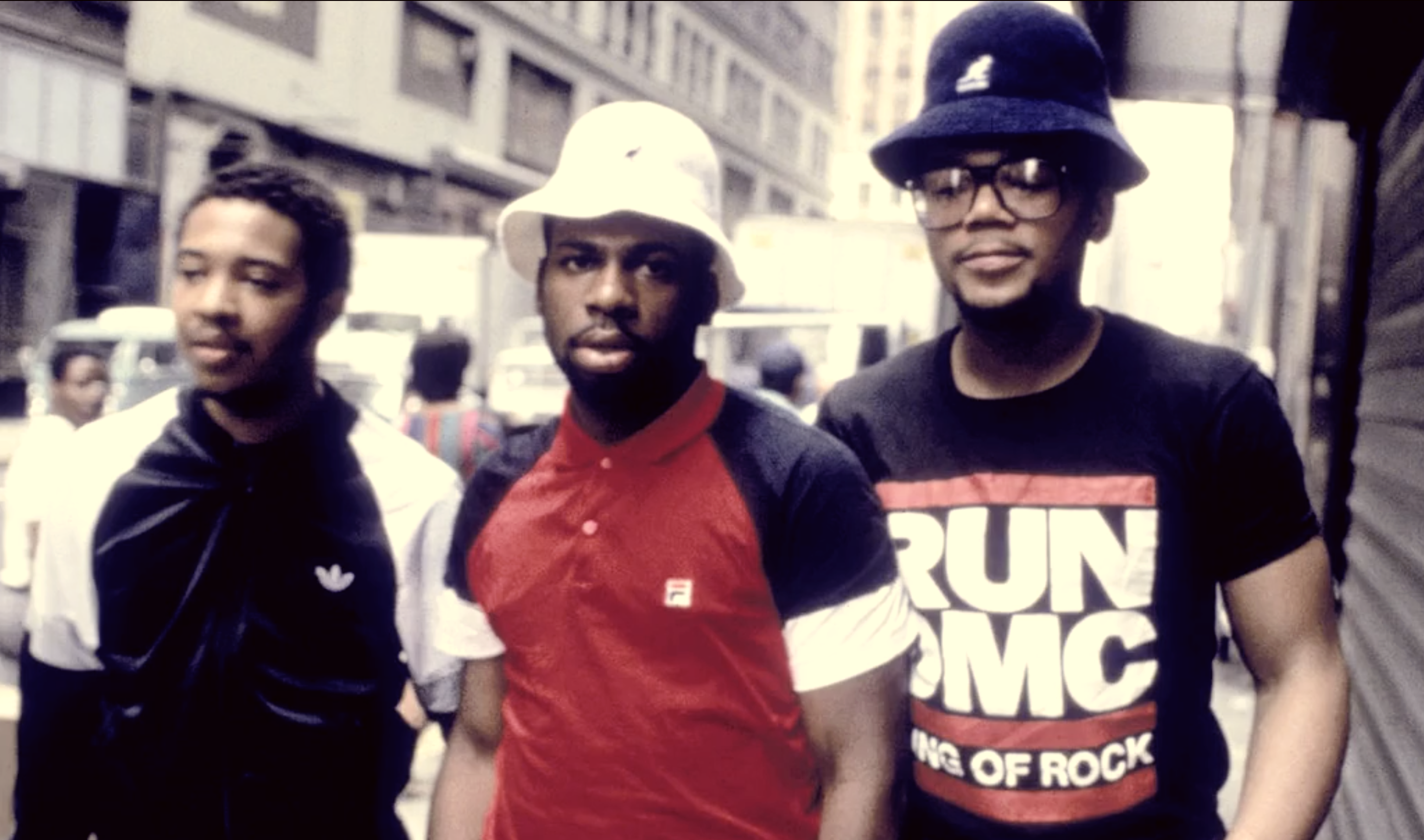
Run–D.M.C. took "Walk This Way" to number one for seven weeks in 1986 and 1987.

| Date | Artist | Single | Weeks at number one | Ref. |
|---|---|---|---|---|
| 5 January | Peking Man | "Room That Echoes" | 6 weeks | |
| 12 January | Peking Man | "Room That Echoes" | 6 weeks | |
| 19 January | Peking Man | "Room That Echoes" | 6 weeks | |
| 26 January | Elton John | "Nikita" | 3 weeks | |
| 2 February | Elton John | "Nikita" | 3 weeks | |
| 9 February | Elton John | "Nikita" | 3 weeks | |
| 16 February | Wham! | "I'm Your Man" | 1 week | |
| 23 February | Pet Shop Boys | "West End Girls" | 4 weeks | |
| 2 March | Pet Shop Boys | "West End Girls" | 4 weeks | |
| 9 March | Pet Shop Boys | "West End Girls" | 4 weeks | |
| 16 March | Pet Shop Boys | "West End Girls" | 4 weeks | |
| 23 March | Falco | "Rock Me Amadeus" | 5 weeks | |
| 30 March | Falco | "Rock Me Amadeus" | 5 weeks | |
| 6 April | Falco | "Rock Me Amadeus" | 5 weeks | |
| 13 April | Falco | "Rock Me Amadeus" | 5 weeks | |
| 20 April | Falco | "Rock Me Amadeus" | 5 weeks | |
| 27 April | The Rolling Stones | "Harlem Shuffle" | 1 week | |
| 4 May | Cliff Richard and The Young Ones | "Living Doll" | 6 weeks | |
| 11 May | Cliff Richard and The Young Ones | "Living Doll" | 6 weeks | |
| 18 May | Cliff Richard and The Young Ones | "Living Doll" | 6 weeks | |
| 25 May | Cliff Richard and The Young Ones | "Living Doll" | 6 weeks | |
| 1 June | Cliff Richard and The Young Ones | "Living Doll" | 6 weeks | |
| 8 June | Cliff Richard and The Young Ones | "Living Doll" | 6 weeks | |
| 15 June | All of Us | "Sailing Away" | 9 weeks | |
| 22 June | All of Us | "Sailing Away" | 9 weeks | |
| 29 June | All of Us | "Sailing Away" | 9 weeks | |
| 6 July | All of Us | "Sailing Away" | 9 weeks | |
| 13 July | All of Us | "Sailing Away" | 9 weeks | |
| 20 July | All of Us | "Sailing Away" | 9 weeks | |
| 27 July | All of Us | "Sailing Away" | 9 weeks | |
| 3 August | All of Us | "Sailing Away" | 9 weeks | |
| 10 August | All of Us | "Sailing Away" | 9 weeks | |
| 17 August | Boys Don't Cry | "I Wanna Be a Cowboy" | 3 weeks | |
| 24 August | Boys Don't Cry | "I Wanna Be a Cowboy" | 3 weeks | |
| 31 August | Boys Don't Cry | "I Wanna Be a Cowboy" | 3 weeks | |
| 7 September | Bananarama | "Venus" | 4 weeks | |
| 14 September | Bananarama | "Venus" | 4 weeks | |
| 21 September | Bananarama | "Venus" | 4 weeks | |
| 28 September | Bananarama | "Venus" | 4 weeks | |
| 5 October | Dave Dobbyn with Herbs | "Slice of Heaven" | 8 weeks | |
| 12 October | Dave Dobbyn with Herbs | "Slice of Heaven" | 8 weeks | |
| 19 October | Dave Dobbyn with Herbs | "Slice of Heaven" | 8 weeks | |
| 26 October | Dave Dobbyn with Herbs | "Slice of Heaven" | 8 weeks | |
| 2 November | Dave Dobbyn with Herbs | "Slice of Heaven" | 8 weeks | |
| 9 November | Dave Dobbyn with Herbs | "Slice of Heaven" | 8 weeks | |
| 16 November | Dave Dobbyn with Herbs | "Slice of Heaven" | 8 weeks | |
| 23 November | Dave Dobbyn with Herbs | "Slice of Heaven" | 8 weeks | |
| 30 November | Run–D.M.C. | "Walk This Way" | 7 weeks | |
| 7 December | Run–D.M.C. | "Walk This Way" | 7 weeks | |
| 14 December | Run–D.M.C. | "Walk This Way" | 7 weeks | |
| 21 December | Run–D.M.C. | "Walk This Way" | 7 weeks | |
| 28 December | Run–D.M.C. | "Walk This Way" | 7 weeks | |

== 1987 ==
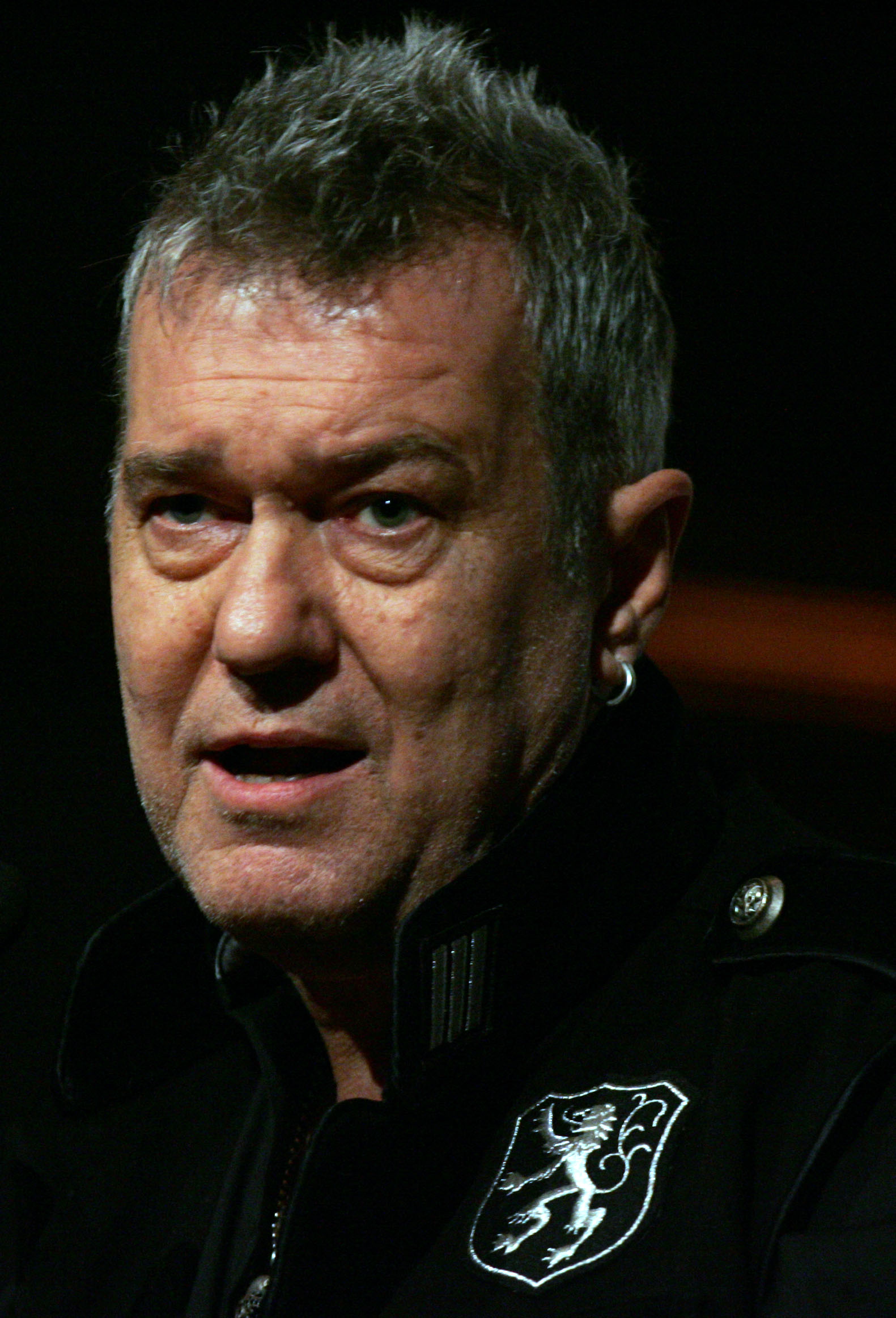
Jimmy Barnes teamed up with INXS for "Good Times", which topped the New Zealand chart for four weeks.

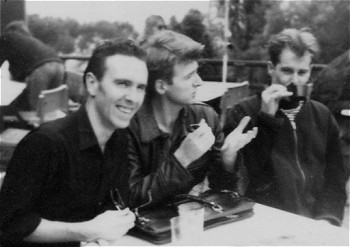
Crowded House peaked atop the New Zealand chart for two weeks with their highest-charting hit, "Don't Dream It's Over".

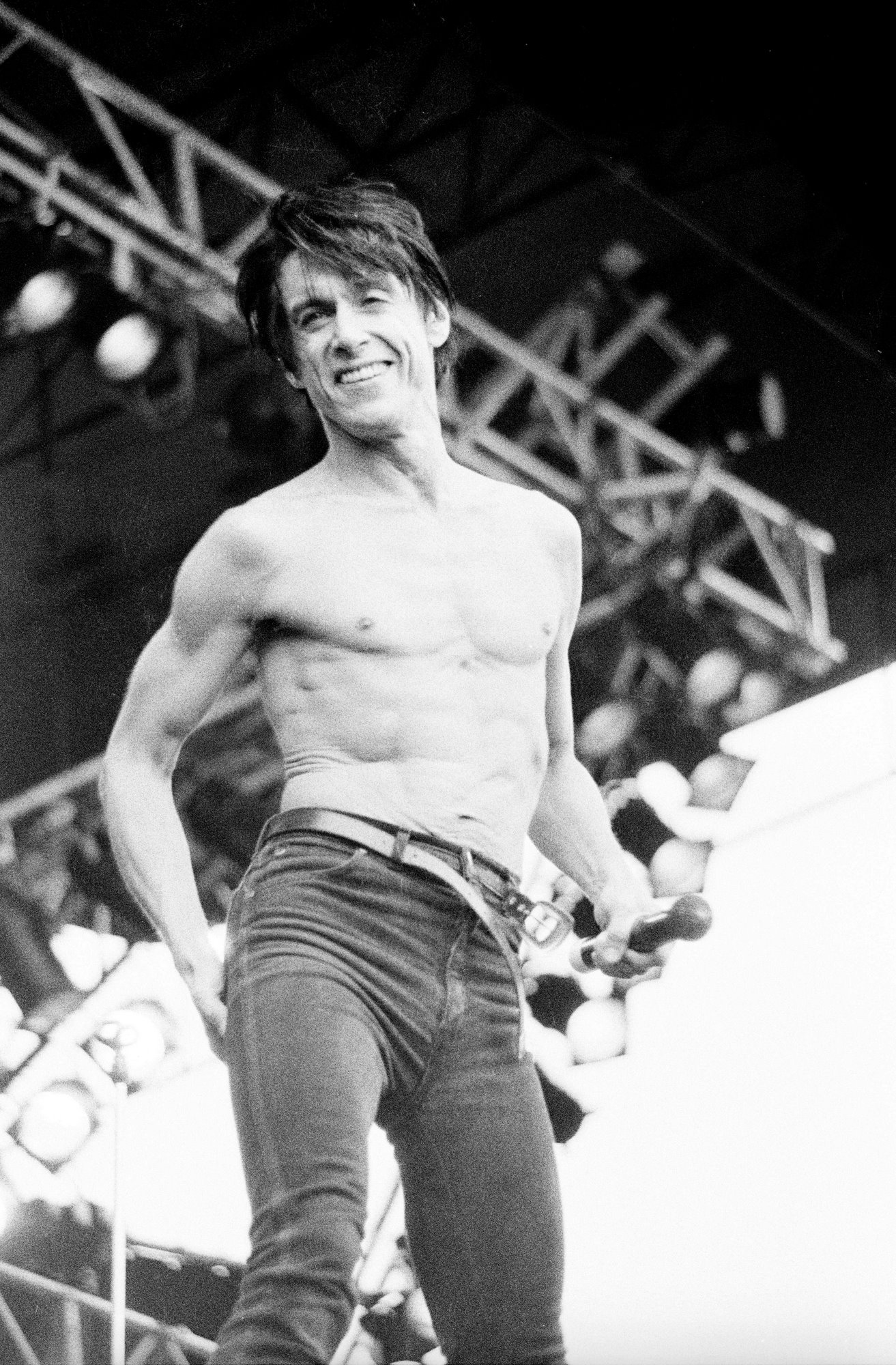
Iggy Pop reached the number-one spot with "Real Wild Child (Wild One)".

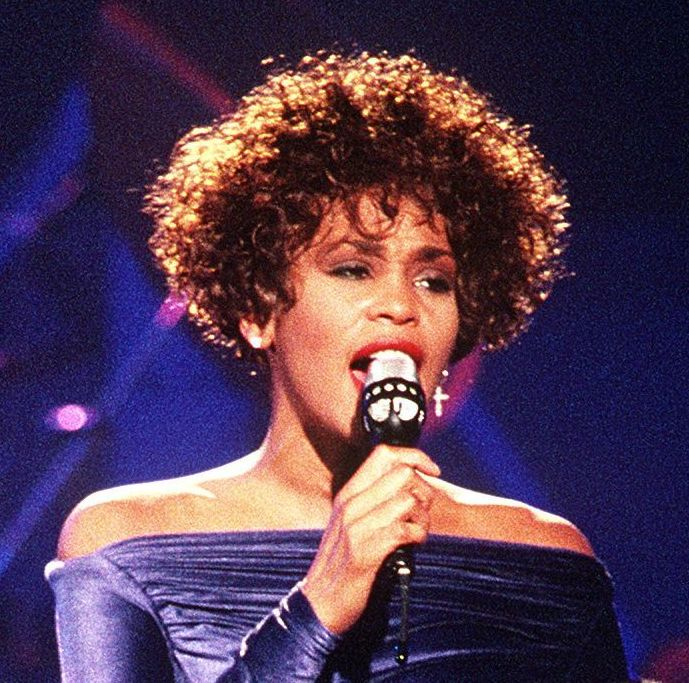
"I Wanna Dance with Somebody (Who Loves Me)" gave Whitney Houston her first of three New Zealand chart-topping hits.

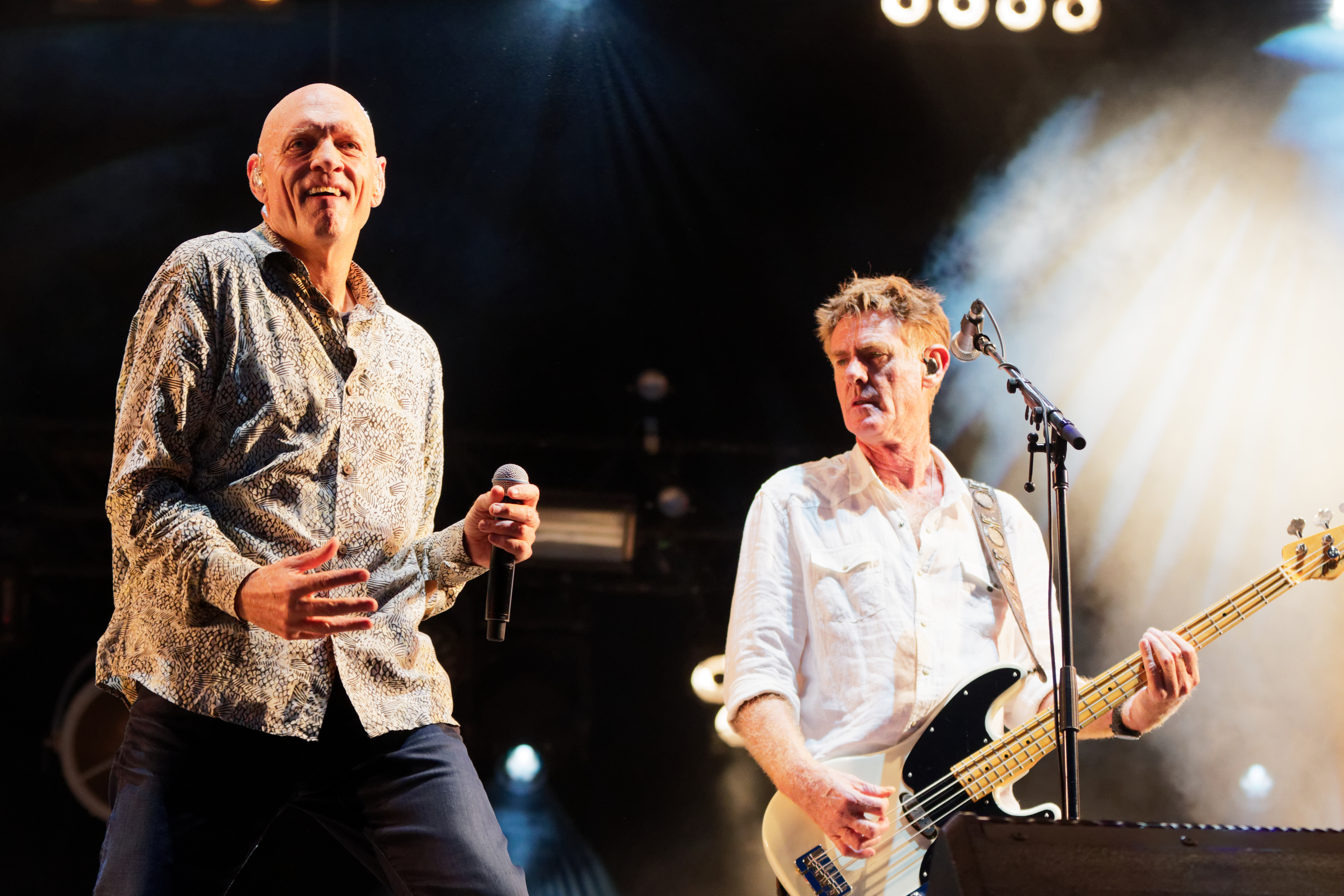
"Beds Are Burning" by Midnight Oil spent four nonconsecutive weeks at the top in October and November 1987.

| Date | Artist | Single | Weeks at number one | Ref. |
|---|---|---|---|---|
| 4 January | Run–D.M.C. | "Walk This Way" | 7 weeks | |
| 11 January | Run–D.M.C. | "Walk This Way" | 7 weeks | |
| 18 January | Gwen Guthrie | "Ain't Nothin' Goin' On but the Rent" | 2 weeks | |
| 25 January | Gwen Guthrie | "Ain't Nothin' Goin' On but the Rent" | 2 weeks | |
| 1 February | Jimmy Barnes and INXS | "Good Times" | 4 weeks | |
| 8 February | Jimmy Barnes and INXS | "Good Times" | 4 weeks | |
| 15 February | Jimmy Barnes and INXS | "Good Times" | 4 weeks | |
| 22 February | Jimmy Barnes and INXS | "Good Times" | 4 weeks | |
| 1 March | Cameo | "Word Up!" | 1 week | |
| 8 March | Pseudo Echo | "Funkytown" | 6 weeks | |
| 15 March | Pseudo Echo | "Funkytown" | 6 weeks | |
| 22 March | Pseudo Echo | "Funkytown" | 6 weeks | |
| 29 March | Pseudo Echo | "Funkytown" | 6 weeks | |
| 5 April | Pseudo Echo | "Funkytown" | 6 weeks | |
| 12 April | Pseudo Echo | "Funkytown" | 6 weeks | |
| 19 April | Crowded House | "Don't Dream It's Over" | 2 weeks | |
| 26 April | Crowded House | "Don't Dream It's Over" | 2 weeks | |
| 3 May | Club Nouveau | "Lean on Me" | 6 weeks | |
| 10 May | Club Nouveau | "Lean on Me" | 6 weeks | |
| 17 May | Club Nouveau | "Lean on Me" | 6 weeks | |
| 24 May | Club Nouveau | "Lean on Me" | 6 weeks | |
| 31 May | Club Nouveau | "Lean on Me" | 6 weeks | |
| 7 June | Club Nouveau | "Lean on Me" | 6 weeks | |
| 14 June | Bon Jovi | "Livin' on a Prayer" | 1 week | |
| 21 June | Iggy Pop | "Real Wild Child (Wild One)" | 1 week | |
| 28 June | Whitney Houston | "I Wanna Dance with Somebody (Who Loves Me)" | 4 weeks | |
| 5 July | Whitney Houston | "I Wanna Dance with Somebody (Who Loves Me)" | 4 weeks | |
| 12 July | Whitney Houston | "I Wanna Dance with Somebody (Who Loves Me)" | 4 weeks | |
| 19 July | Whitney Houston | "I Wanna Dance with Somebody (Who Loves Me)" | 4 weeks | |
| 26 July | Mel and Kim | "Respectable" | 5 weeks | |
| 2 August | Mel and Kim | "Respectable" | 5 weeks | |
| 9 August | Mel and Kim | "Respectable" | 5 weeks | |
| 16 August | Mel and Kim | "Respectable" | 5 weeks | |
| 23 August | Mel and Kim | "Respectable" | 5 weeks | |
| 30 August | Los Lobos | "La Bamba" | 7 weeks | |
| 6 September | Los Lobos | "La Bamba" | 7 weeks | |
| 13 September | Los Lobos | "La Bamba" | 7 weeks | |
| 20 September | Los Lobos | "La Bamba" | 7 weeks | |
| 27 September | Los Lobos | "La Bamba" | 7 weeks | |
| 4 October | Los Lobos | "La Bamba" | 7 weeks | |
| 11 October | Los Lobos | "La Bamba" | 7 weeks | |
| 18 October | Tex Pistol | "The Game of Love" | 1 week | |
| 25 October | Midnight Oil | "Beds Are Burning" | 4 weeks | |
| 1 November | Midnight Oil | "Beds Are Burning" | 4 weeks | |
| 8 November | U2 | "Where the Streets Have No Name" | 2 weeks | |
| 15 November | U2 | "Where the Streets Have No Name" | 2 weeks | |
| 22 November | Midnight Oil | "Beds Are Burning" | 4 weeks | |
| 29 November | Midnight Oil | "Beds Are Burning" | 4 weeks | |
| 6 December | George Michael | "Faith" | 7 weeks | |
| 13 December | George Michael | "Faith" | 7 weeks | |
| 20 December | George Michael | "Faith" | 7 weeks | |
| 27 December | George Michael | "Faith" | 7 weeks | |

== 1988 ==
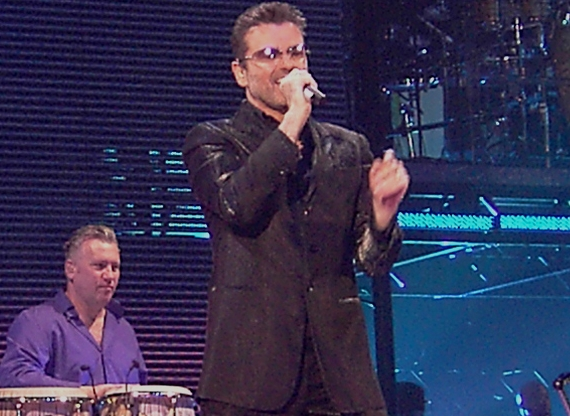
George Michael's "Faith" topped New Zealand's chart for seven weeks in 1987 and 1988.

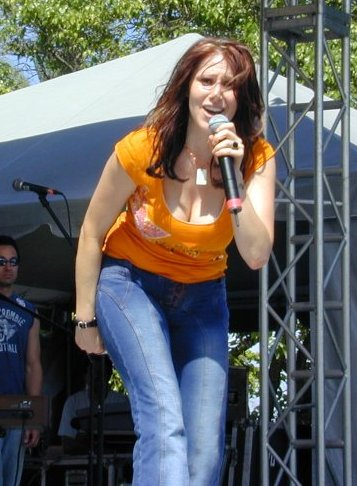
American singer Tiffany Darwish topped the chart for two weeks with her cover of "I Think We're Alone Now".

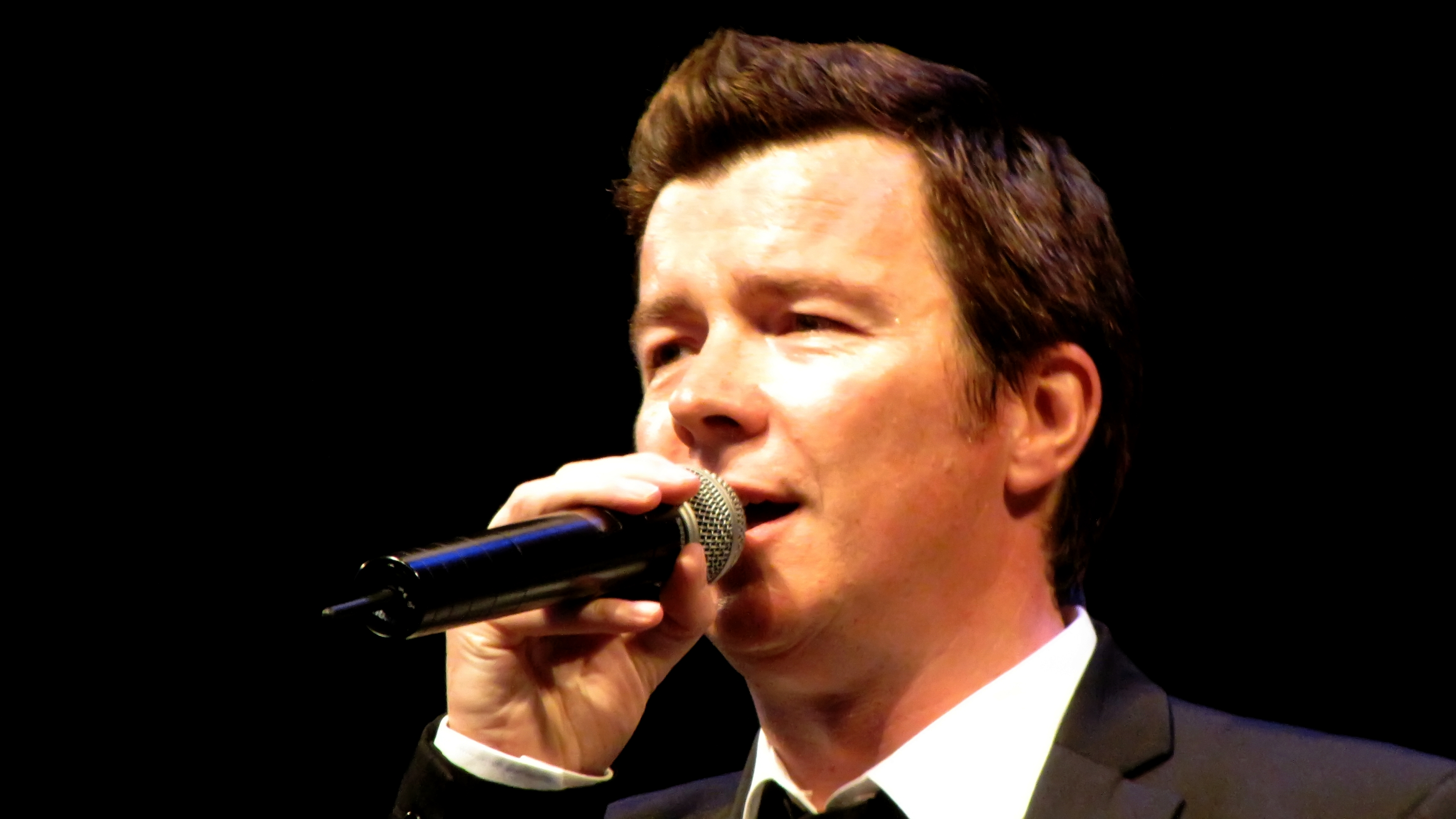
English singer Rick Astley spent a single week at number one in February 1988 with his most successful hit, "Never Gonna Give You Up".

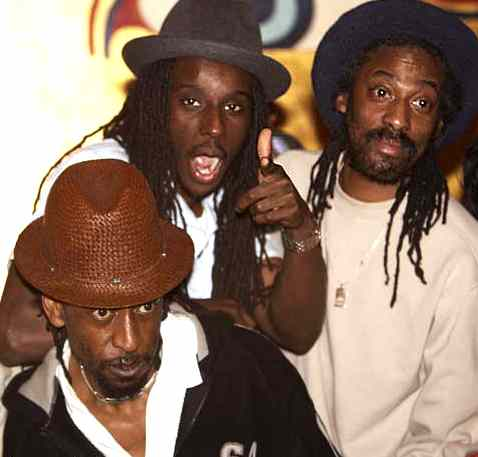
"Don't Turn Around" by Aswad had a two-week stay at number one in June 1988.

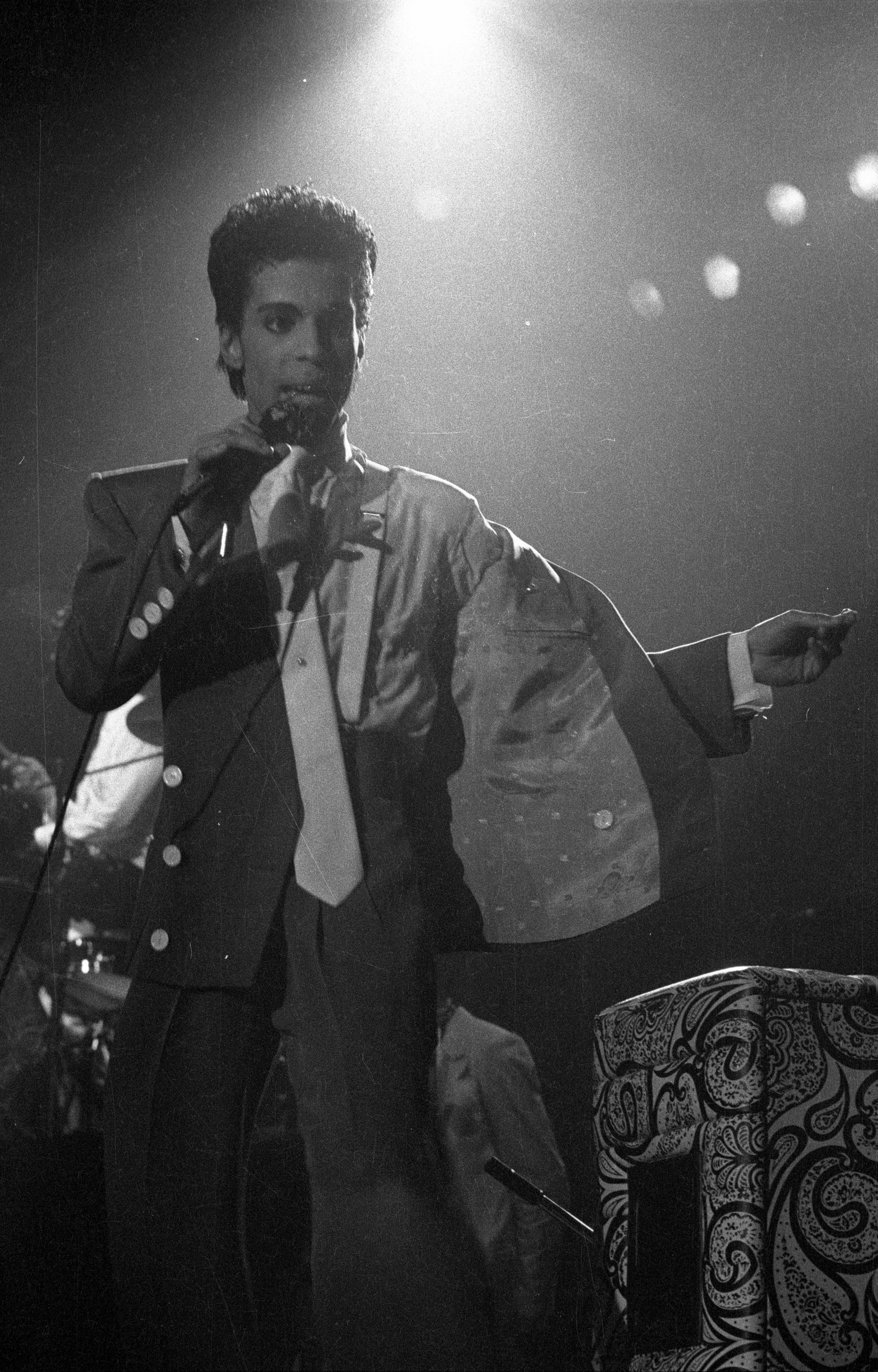
Prince earned his first two New Zealand number-one singles in the 1980s: "Alphabet St." and "Batdance".

| Date | Artist | Single | Weeks at number one | Ref. |
|---|---|---|---|---|
| 3 January | George Michael | "Faith" | 7 weeks | |
| 10 January | George Michael | "Faith" | 7 weeks | |
| 17 January | George Michael | "Faith" | 7 weeks | |
| 24 January | Tiffany | "I Think We're Alone Now" | 2 weeks | |
| 31 January | Tiffany | "I Think We're Alone Now" | 2 weeks | |
| 7 February | Rick Astley | "Never Gonna Give You Up" | 1 week | |
| 14 February | M|A|R|R|S | "Pump Up the Volume" | 2 weeks | |
| 21 February | M|A|R|R|S | "Pump Up the Volume" | 2 weeks | |
| 28 February | Belinda Carlisle | "Heaven Is a Place on Earth" | 4 weeks | |
| 6 March | Belinda Carlisle | "Heaven Is a Place on Earth" | 4 weeks | |
| 13 March | Belinda Carlisle | "Heaven Is a Place on Earth" | 4 weeks | |
| 20 March | Belinda Carlisle | "Heaven Is a Place on Earth" | 4 weeks | |
| 27 March | U2 | "One Tree Hill" | 7 weeks | |
| 3 April | U2 | "One Tree Hill" | 7 weeks | |
| 10 April | U2 | "One Tree Hill" | 7 weeks | |
| 17 April | U2 | "One Tree Hill" | 7 weeks | |
| 24 April | U2 | "One Tree Hill" | 7 weeks | |
| 1 May | U2 | "One Tree Hill" | 7 weeks | |
| 8 May | U2 | "One Tree Hill" | 7 weeks | |
| 15 May | Pet Shop Boys | "Heart" | 1 week | |
| 22 May | Big Pig | "Breakaway" | 2 weeks | |
| 29 May | Big Pig | "Breakaway" | 2 weeks | |
| 5 June | Aswad | "Don't Turn Around" | 2 weeks | |
| 12 June | Aswad | "Don't Turn Around" | 2 weeks | |
| 19 June | Prince | "Alphabet St." | 1 week | |
| 26 June | New Order | "Blue Monday 1988" | 3 weeks | |
| 3 July | New Order | "Blue Monday 1988" | 3 weeks | |
| 10 July | New Order | "Blue Monday 1988" | 3 weeks | |
| 17 July | Holidaymakers | "Sweet Lovers" | 6 weeks | |
| 24 July | Holidaymakers | "Sweet Lovers" | 6 weeks | |
| 31 July | Holidaymakers | "Sweet Lovers" | 6 weeks | |
| 7 August | Holidaymakers | "Sweet Lovers" | 6 weeks | |
| 14 August | Holidaymakers | "Sweet Lovers" | 6 weeks | |
| 21 August | Holidaymakers | "Sweet Lovers" | 6 weeks | |
| 28 August | The Timelords | "Doctorin' the Tardis" | 3 weeks | |
| 4 September | The Timelords | "Doctorin' the Tardis" | 3 weeks | |
| 11 September | The Timelords | "Doctorin' the Tardis" | 3 weeks | |
| 18 September | Times Two | "Cecilia" | 3 weeks | |
| 25 September | Times Two | "Cecilia" | 3 weeks | |
| 2 October | Times Two | "Cecilia" | 3 weeks | |
| 9 October | Tex Pistol and Rikki Morris | "Nobody Else" | 1 week | |
| 16 October | U2 | "Desire" | 5 weeks | |
| 23 October | U2 | "Desire" | 5 weeks | |
| 30 October | U2 | "Desire" | 5 weeks | |
| 6 November | U2 | "Desire" | 5 weeks | |
| 13 November | U2 | "Desire" | 5 weeks | |
| 20 November | Yazz and the Plastic Population | "The Only Way Is Up" | 3 weeks | |
| 27 November | Yazz and the Plastic Population | "The Only Way Is Up" | 3 weeks | |
| 4 December | Yazz and the Plastic Population | "The Only Way Is Up" | 3 weeks | |
| 11 December | When the Cat's Away | "Melting Pot" | 1 week | |
| 18 December | Womack & Womack | "Teardrops" | 4 weeks | |
| 25 December | Womack & Womack | "Teardrops" | 4 weeks | |

== 1989 ==
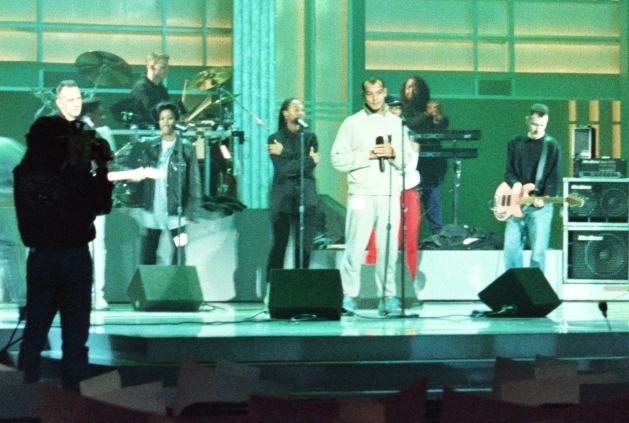
In March and April 1989, Fine Young Cannibals spent five weeks at number one with "She Drives Me Crazy".

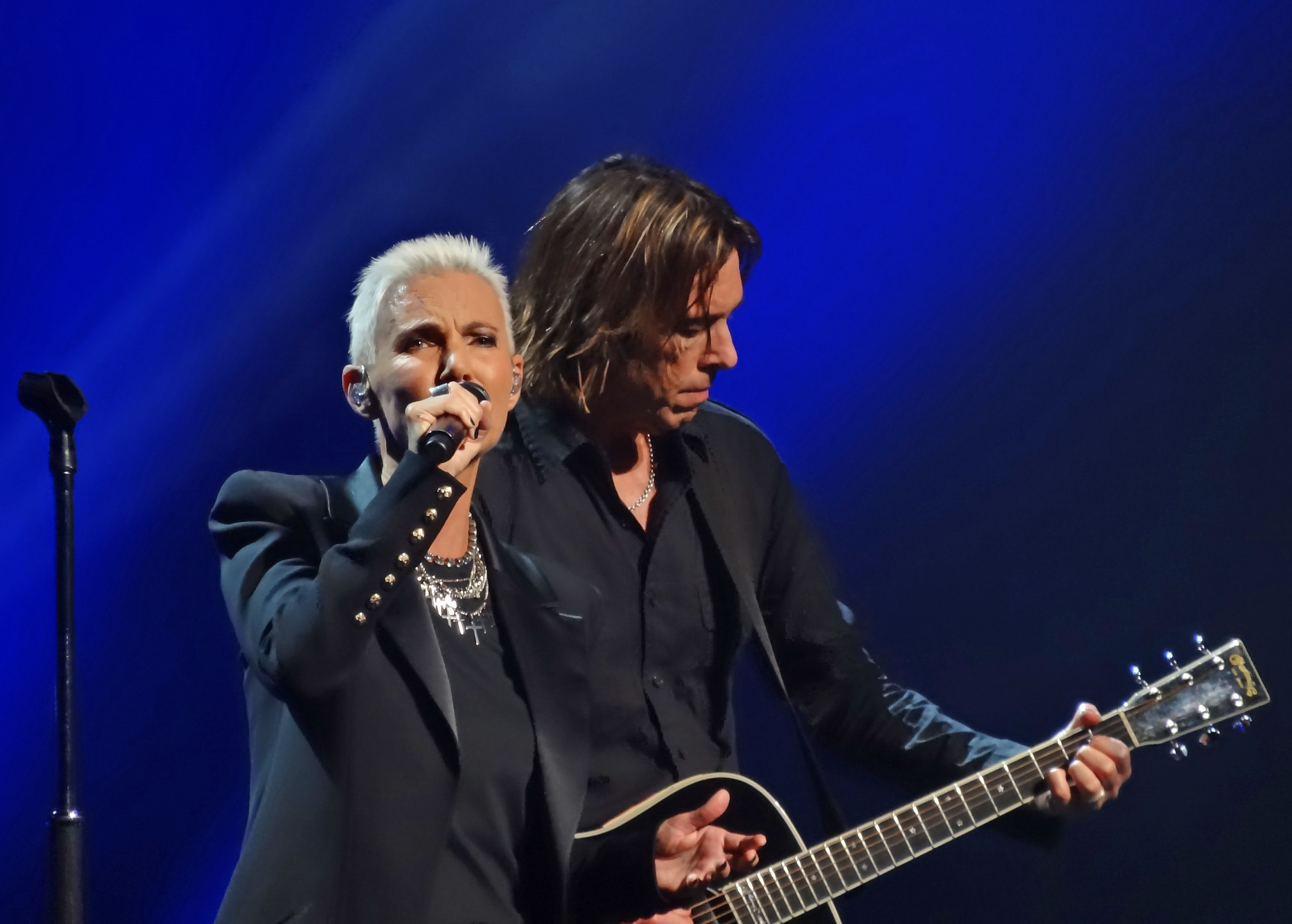
Swedish pop duo Roxette picked up their only New Zealand number-one hit with "The Look" in May 1989.

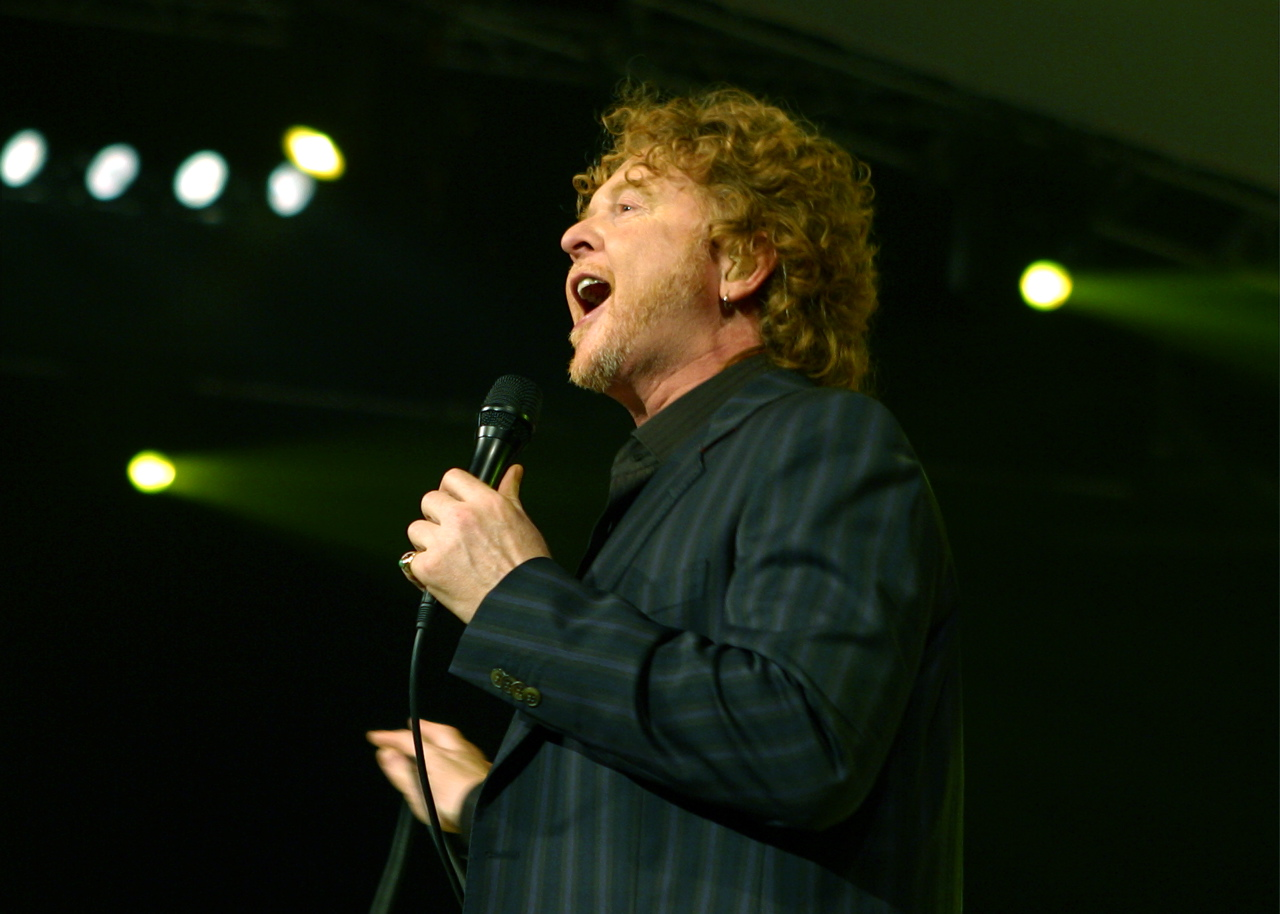
Simply Red (lead singer Mick Hucknall pictured) had the most successful song of 1989 in New Zealand: "If You Don't Know Me by Now".

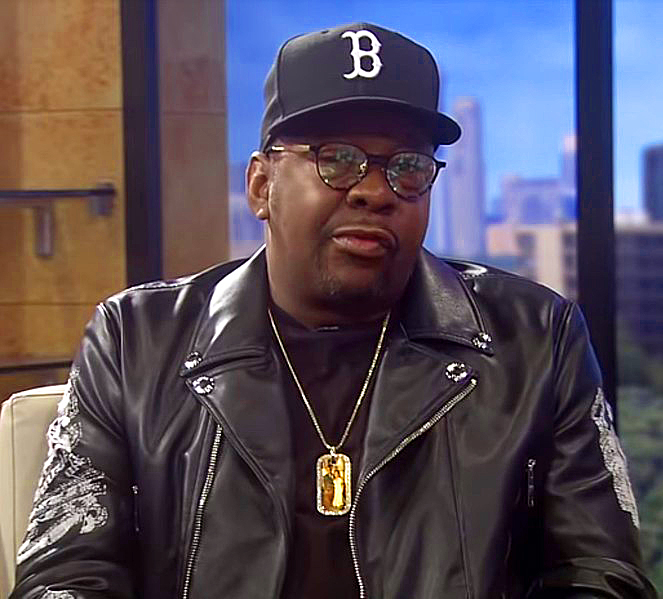
Bobby Brown's "On Our Own" rose to number one for three weeks in September and October 1989.

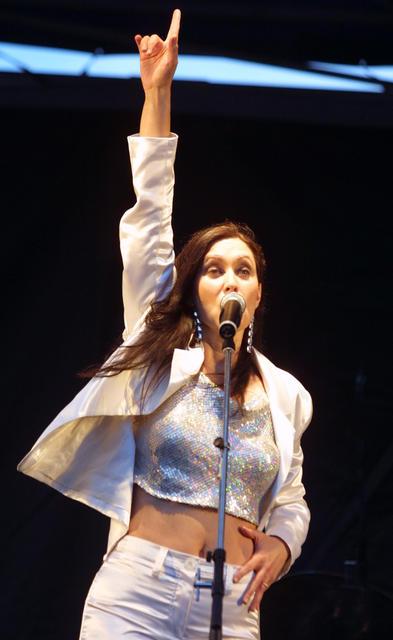
"Escaping" by Margaret Urlich topped the New Zealand chart in December 1989 and January 1990.

| Date | Artist | Single | Weeks at number one | Ref. |
|---|---|---|---|---|
| 1 January | Womack & Womack | "Teardrops" | 4 weeks | |
| 8 January | Womack & Womack | "Teardrops" | 4 weeks | |
| 15 January | The Proclaimers | "I'm Gonna Be (500 Miles)" | 2 weeks | |
| 22 January | The Proclaimers | "I'm Gonna Be (500 Miles)" | 2 weeks | |
| 29 January | U2 | "Angel of Harlem" | 4 weeks | |
| 5 February | U2 | "Angel of Harlem" | 4 weeks | |
| 12 February | U2 | "Angel of Harlem" | 4 weeks | |
| 19 February | U2 | "Angel of Harlem" | 4 weeks | |
| 26 February | Art of Noise featuring Tom Jones | "Kiss" | 1 week | |
| 5 March | Fine Young Cannibals | "She Drives Me Crazy" | 5 weeks | |
| 12 March | Fine Young Cannibals | "She Drives Me Crazy" | 5 weeks | |
| 19 March | Fine Young Cannibals | "She Drives Me Crazy" | 5 weeks | |
| 26 March | Fine Young Cannibals | "She Drives Me Crazy" | 5 weeks | |
| 2 April | Fine Young Cannibals | "She Drives Me Crazy" | 5 weeks | |
| 9 April | Madonna | "Like a Prayer" | 2 weeks | |
| 16 April | Madonna | "Like a Prayer" | 2 weeks | |
| 23 April | Tone Lōc | "Wild Thing" | 2 weeks | |
| 30 April | Tone Lōc | "Wild Thing" | 2 weeks | |
| 7 May | Roxette | "The Look" | 3 weeks | |
| 14 May | Roxette | "The Look" | 3 weeks | |
| 21 May | The Cult | "Fire Woman" | 1 week | |
| 28 May | Roxette | "The Look" | 3 weeks | |
| 4 June | Simply Red | "If You Don't Know Me by Now" | 5 weeks | |
| 11 June | Simply Red | "If You Don't Know Me by Now" | 5 weeks | |
| 18 June | Simply Red | "If You Don't Know Me by Now" | 5 weeks | |
| 25 June | Simply Red | "If You Don't Know Me by Now" | 5 weeks | |
| 2 July | John Cougar Mellencamp | "Pop Singer" | 1 week | |
| 9 July | Simply Red | "If You Don't Know Me by Now" | 5 weeks | |
| 16 July | Prince | "Batdance" | 4 weeks | |
| 23 July | Edelweiss | "Bring Me Edelweiss" | 1 week | |
| 30 July | Prince | "Batdance" | 4 weeks | |
| 6 August | Prince | "Batdance" | 4 weeks | |
| 13 August | Prince | "Batdance" | 4 weeks | |
| 20 August | Martika | "Toy Soldiers" | 4 weeks | |
| 27 August | Martika | "Toy Soldiers" | 4 weeks | |
| 3 September | Martika | "Toy Soldiers" | 4 weeks | |
| 10 September | Martika | "Toy Soldiers" | 4 weeks | |
| 17 September | Bobby Brown | "On Our Own" | 3 weeks | |
| 24 September | Bobby Brown | "On Our Own" | 3 weeks | |
| 1 October | Bobby Brown | "On Our Own" | 3 weeks | |
| 8 October | Jive Bunny and the Mastermixers | "Swing the Mood" | 5 weeks | |
| 15 October | Jive Bunny and the Mastermixers | "Swing the Mood" | 5 weeks | |
| 22 October | Jive Bunny and the Mastermixers | "Swing the Mood" | 5 weeks | |
| 29 October | Jive Bunny and the Mastermixers | "Swing the Mood" | 5 weeks | |
| 5 November | Jive Bunny and the Mastermixers | "Swing the Mood" | 5 weeks | |
| 12 November | Richard Marx | "Right Here Waiting" | 3 weeks | |
| 19 November | Richard Marx | "Right Here Waiting" | 3 weeks | |
| 26 November | Richard Marx | "Right Here Waiting" | 3 weeks | |
| 3 December | Margaret Urlich | "Escaping" | 6 weeks (1 in 1990) | |
| 10 December | Margaret Urlich | "Escaping" | 6 weeks (1 in 1990) | |
| 17 December | Margaret Urlich | "Escaping" | 6 weeks (1 in 1990) | |
| 24 December | Margaret Urlich | "Escaping" | 6 weeks (1 in 1990) | |
| 31 December | Margaret Urlich | "Escaping" | 6 weeks (1 in 1990) | |

== Artists with the most number-one songs ==
| Artist | Number-one singles | Longest run | Total weeks at number one |
|---|---|---|---|
| U2 | 5 | "One Tree Hill (7 weeks) | 19 |
| UB40 | 3 | "I Got You Babe" (with Chrissie Hynde) (6 weeks) | 11 |
| Stevie Wonder | 3 | "I Just Called to Say I Love You" (8 weeks) | 14 |

Excluded statistics

- Artists who appeared in the charity songs of the 1980s, including Band Aid's "Do They Know It's Christmas?" and USA for Africa's "We Are the World", which were both number-one singles, are not included in the individual tallies.

== Most weeks at number one ==
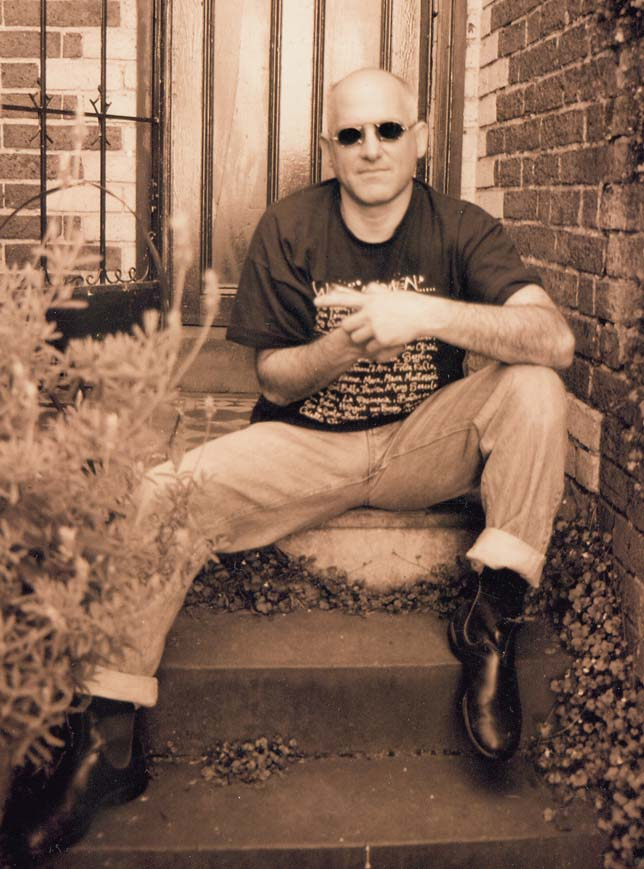
Joe Dolce topped New Zealand's music chart with "Shaddap You Face" for eight weeks in 1980 and 1981.

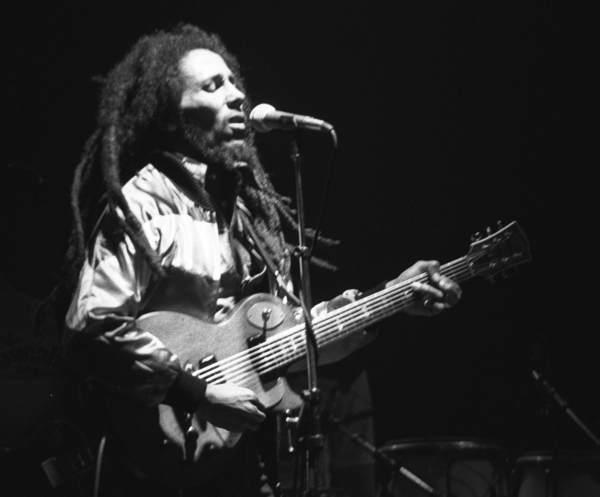
Bob Marley and his band, The Wailers, remained seven weeks at the top position with "One Love/People Get Ready".

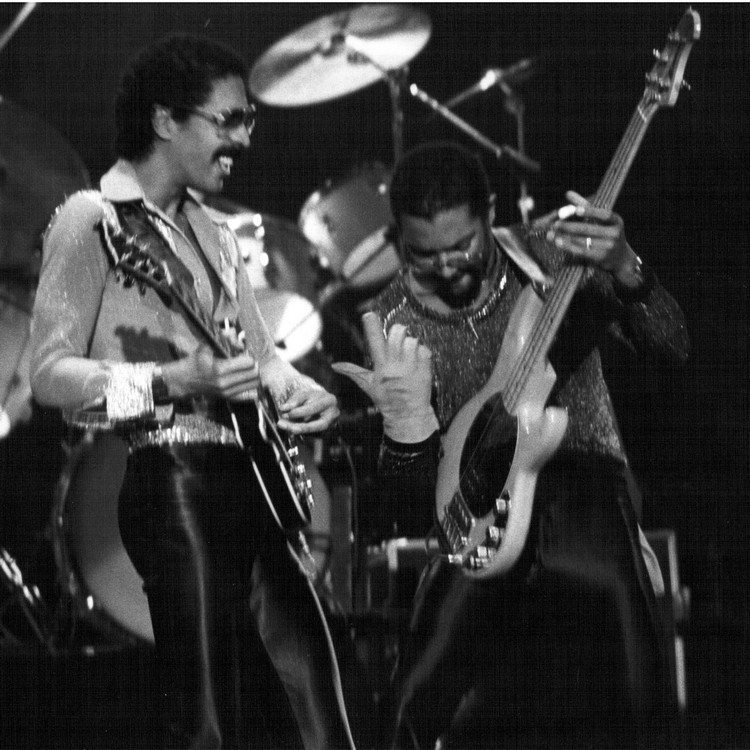
"Stomp!" by the Brothers Johnson peaked atop the New Zealand Singles Chart for six weeks.

Key

† – Song of New Zealand origin

| Title | Artist | Reached number one | Weeks at number one |
|---|---|---|---|
| "Sailing Away" | All of Us | 15 June 1986 | 9 |
| "Hands Up (Give Me Your Heart)" | Ottawan | 14 March 1982 | 9 |
| "Jezebel" | Jon Stevens | 2 December 1979 | 8 |
| "Slice of Heaven" | Dave Dobbyn featuring Herbs | 5 October 1986 | 8 |
| "How Great Thou Art" | Howard Morrison | 20 December 1981 | 8 |
| "Shaddap You Face" | Joe Dolce Music Theatre | 21 December 1980 | 8 |
| "I Just Called to Say I Love You" | Stevie Wonder | 14 October 1984 | 8 |
| "Uptown Girl" | Billy Joel | 11 December 1983 | 7 |
| "One Love/People Get Ready" | Bob Marley and the Wailers | 29 July 1984 | 7 |
| "Faith" | George Michael | 6 December 1987 | 7 |
| "La Bamba" | Los Lobos | 30 August 1987 | 7 |
| "Pass the Dutchie" | Musical Youth | 5 December 1982 | 7 |
| "Locomotion" | Ritz | 20 July 1980 | 7 |
| "Walk This Way" | Run–D.M.C. | 30 November 1986 | 7 |
| "Stars on 45" | Stars on 45 | 5 October 1987 | 7 |
| "One Tree Hill" | U2 | 27 March 1988 | 7 |
| "We Are the World" | USA for Africa | 21 April 1985 | 7 |
| "Stomp!" | The Brothers Johnson | 1 June 1980 | 6 |
| "Living Doll" | Cliff Richard and The Young Ones | 4 May 1986 | 6 |
| "Lean on Me" | Club Nouveau | 3 May 1987 | 6 |
| "Karma Chameleon" | Culture Club | 30 October 1983 | 6 |
| "Sweet Lovers" | Holidaymakers | 10 July 1986 | 6 |
| "Flashdance... What a Feeling" | Irene Cara | 31 July 1981 | 6 |
| "Into the Groove" | Madonna | 11 August 1985 | 6 |
| "Sexual Healing" | Marvin Gaye | 23 January 1983 | 6 |
| "Room That Echoes" | Peking Man | 15 December 1985 | 6 |
| "Funkytown" | Pseudo Echo | 8 March 1987 | 6 |
| "I Got You Babe" | UB40 and Chrissie Hynde | 22 September 1985 | 6 |

== See also ==
- Music of New Zealand
- List of UK Singles Chart number ones of the 1980s
- List of Billboard number-one singles
- List of number-one singles in Australia during the 1980s
