= D.I.S.C.O. (album) =

Studio album by Ottawan
- Released: 1980
- Recorded: 1979
- Genre: Disco
- Language: English, French
- Label: Carrere (Europe), Polydor South America, Central America, Caribbean and Europe), Mercury (North America); Phonogram (Africa, Asia and Oceania).
- Producer: Daniel Vangarde

Ottawan chronology
D.I.S.C.O. (1980)	Ottawan (1980)

Singles from D.I.S.C.O.
- 1. "D.I.S.C.O." Released: 1979; 2. "You're OK" Released: 1980; 3. "Shalala Song" Released: 1980; 4. "Help, Get Me Some Help!" Released: 1981

D.I.S.C.O. is the 1980 debut album by the pop music duo Ottawan. It includes the single D.I.S.C.O.

== Track listing ==
Side A
No.	Title	Writer(s)	Length
1.	"D.I.S.C.O."	D. Vangarde, J. Kluger	5:00
2.	"Hello Rio!"	D. Vangarde, N. Byl	4:27
3.	"Shalala Song"	D. Vangarde, N. Byl	3:38
4.	"Tant que durera la nuit"	D. Vangarde, J. Kluger	4:20

Side B
No.	Title	Writer(s)	Length
1.	"Help, Get Me Some Help!"	D. Vangarde, N. Byl	4:27
2.	"You're O.K."	D. Vangarde, J. Kluger (Adapt.: N. Byl)	5:10
3.	"Comme Aux U.S.A."	D. Vangarde, J. Kluger	3:35
4.	"D.I.S.C.O." (french version)	D. Vangarde, J. Kluger	3:39
