= Hands Up (Give Me Your Heart) =

1981 song by Ottawan

Single by Ottawan
- B-side: "Hands Up (Give Me Your Heart) (Instrumental)"
- Released: 1981
- Recorded: 1980
- Genre: Eurodisco, disco
- Length: 3:16 (edit); 3:29 (single edit); 4:47 (album version)
- Label: Carrere; Next Plateau Entertainment (USA)
- Songwriters: Daniel Vangarde; Jean Kluger
- Producers: Vangarde; Kluger

Ottawan singles chronology
"Haut les mains (donne-moi ton cœur)" (1980)	"Hands Up (Give Me Your Heart)" (1981)	"Crazy Music" (1981)

"Hands Up (Give Me Your Heart)" is a 1981 song by Ottawan. It was the band's second-biggest international hit single, after their 1979 hit "D.I.S.C.O.". The song reached the top 5 across Europe and became a number one for eight consecutive weeks in New Zealand. It was not released in North America until 1991 as a remix.

A French version, titled "Haut les mains (donne moi ton cœur)", is a near translation of the English version.

== Sway version ==
In 1987, Club Med commissioned a re-recording of the song to serve as the new commercial jingle for its television advertising. The new version was recorded by Sway, a one-off vocal group featuring Canadian musicians Vivienne Williams, Sharon Lee Williams and Colina Phillips on vocals, and was produced by reggae musician Carl Harvey.

The Sway version reached #7 on Canada's RPM charts in 1988, and was a Juno Award nominee for Best Single at the Juno Awards of 1989.

== Chart history ==
=== Weekly charts ===
Ottawan original

Chart (1981–1982)	Peak position
Australia (Kent Music Report)	25
Austria (Ö3 Austria Top 40)	3
Belgium (Ultratop 50 Flanders)	4
Denmark (Hitlisten)	1
Finland (Suomen virallinen lista)	2
Ireland (IRMA)	1
Netherlands (Dutch Top 40)	2
Netherlands (Single Top 100)	2
Norway (VG-lista)	1
New Zealand (Recorded Music NZ)	1
South Africa (Springbok Radio)	5
Spain (AFYVE)	1
Sweden (Sverigetopplistan)	2
Switzerland (Schweizer Hitparade)	4
UK Singles (Official Charts)	3
West Germany (GfK)	2

=== Year-end charts ===
Chart (1981)	Position
Austria (Ö3 Austria Top 40)	11
Belgium (Ultratop Flanders)	40
Netherlands (Dutch Top 40)	39
Netherlands (Single Top 100)	65
UK Singles (OCC)	15
West Germany (Official German Charts)	9
Chart (1982)	Position
Australia (Kent Music Report)	77

Sway version

Chart (1988)	Peak position
Canada RPM Top Singles	7

Chart (1988)	Rank
Canada	57

== Hype version ==
"Hands Up"

Single by Hype

from the album Provocative
- B-side: "Remix"
- Released: 1995
- Genre: Eurodance
- Length: 3:54
- Label: Hype Records As
- Songwriters: Daniel Vangarde; Jean Kluger; Nelly Byl
- Producer: Le'Cream

Hype singles chronology
"U Don't Know What I Want" (1995)	"Hands Up" (1995)	"Set U Free" (1996)

Music video
- "Hands Up" on YouTube

"Hands Up" is a song by Norwegian Eurodance group Hype, consisting of singer and former model Linda Johansen and two rappers. Released in 1995 by Hype Records as a cover of the 1981-single by French pop music duo Ottawan, it peaked at number ten on the Norwegian singles chart. In Finland, the song was an even bigger hit, reaching number seven. A controversial music video featuring frequent nudity with brief modesty bars was also produced for the song.

Swedish band Army of Lovers had a number 44 hit in Sweden in 2001 with their cover version of the same song.

=== Track listing ===
- CD maxi, Scandinavia
1. "Hands Up" (Radio Mix) — 3:54
2. "Hands Up" (Back to 70 Mix) — 3:42
3. "Hands Up" (Hello Germany Mix) — 5:00
4. "Hands Up" (Like It Fast?) — 4:51
5. "Hands Up" (Stadium Mix) — 3:36
- CD maxi, Europe
1. "Hands Up" (Hot Video Mix) — 3:54
2. "Hands Up" (Guitar Mix) — 3:58
3. "Hands Up" (Groovy Underground Mix) — 5:23
4. "Hands Up" (Deep Down the Bassment Mix) — 5:24
5. "Hands Up" (Back to 70 Mix) — 3:42
6. "Hands Up" (Hello Germany Mix) — 5:00
7. "Hands Up" (Stadium Mix) — 3:36
- CD maxi, Spain
1. "Hands Up" (Hot Video Mix) — 3:54
2. "Hands Up" (Back to 70 Mix) — 3:42
3. "Hands Up" (Groovy Underground Mix) — 5:23
4. "Hands Up" (Radio Disco Fever Mix) — 3:25
5. "Hands Up" (Hello Germany Mix) — 5:00
6. "Hands Up" (Like It Fast?) — 4:51

=== Charts ===
Chart (1995)	Peak position
Finland (Suomen virallinen lista)	7
Norway (Ti i skuddet)	5
Norway (VG-lista)	10
