= Que Sera Mi Vida (If You Should Go) =

Single by Gibson Brothers

from the album Cuba
- Released: 1979
- Genre: Disco
- Length: 5:55
- Label: Island Records, Mango Records, Zagora Records
- Songwriters: Nelly Byl, Jean Kluger
- Producer: Daniel Vangarde

Gibson Brothers singles chronology
"Ooh, What a Life" (1979)	"Que Sera Mi Vida (If You Should Go)" (1979)	"Cuba/Better Do It Salsa" (1980)

"Que Sera Mi Vida (If You Should Go)" is a 1979 song by French musical group Gibson Brothers, released as the third single from their fourth album, Cuba (1979). It is their highest-charting single in the UK, reaching number five on the UK Singles Chart. It did not chart in the US pop charts, but made it to number eight on the Billboard Hot Dance Club Play chart.

== Track listing ==
- 7" single

A. "Que Sera Mi Vida (If You Should Go)" – 3:57
B. "Heaven" – 3:56

- 12" single

A. "Que Sera Mi Vida (If You Should Go)" – 6:51
B. "You" – 4:23

== Critical reception ==
David Hepworth from Smash Hits said, "Their usual exuberant sound, but the bassline that made "Cuba" such a classic is getting a little exhausted."

== Charts ==
=== Weekly charts ===
Chart (1979–1981)	Peak position
Australia (Kent Music Report)	9
Austria (Ö3 Austria Top 40)	7
Belgium (Ultratop 50 Flanders)	1
Denmark (Hitlisten)	1
Finland (Suomen virallinen lista)	30
Israel (IBA)	10
Netherlands (Dutch Top 40)	3
Netherlands (Single Top 100)	1
Sweden (Sverigetopplistan)	3
Switzerland (Schweizer Hitparade)	5
UK Singles (OCC)	5
US Hot Dance Club Play (Billboard)	8
West Germany (GfK)	4

=== Year-end charts ===
Chart (1980)	Position
Belgium (Ultratop Flanders)	11
Netherlands (Dutch Top 40)	37
Netherlands (Single Top 100)	14
West Germany (Official German Charts)	15
Chart (1981)	Position
Australia (Kent Music Report)	61

== Sales and certifications ==
Certifications for Que Sera Mi Vida (If You Should Go)
Region	Certification	Certified units/sales
Netherlands (NVPI)	Gold	100,000^{^}
^{^} Shipments figures based on certification alone.
