= Young professional (disambiguation) =

A Young professional is a young person not in school who is employed in a profession or white-collar occupation.

Young professional(s) may refer to:

- The Young Professionals, also known as TYP, stylized T¥P, Israeli electro pop band

== See also ==
- Yuppie, young urban professional or young upwardly-mobile professional
