= 9am to 5pm, 5pm to Whenever =

2011 album by The Young Professionals

9am to 5pm, 5pm to Whenever (09:00 to 17:00, 17:00 to Whenever)

Studio album by The Young Professionals
- Released: September 12, 2011 (Israel); June 18, 2012 (international)
- Recorded: 2011
- Genres: Alternative pop, dance music
- Length: 49:43
- Label: Polydor / Universal Music

09:00 to 17:00, 17:00 to Whenever (original cover)
- 09:00 to 17:00, 17:00 to Whenever original cover

9am to 5pm, 5pm to Whenever is the debut album of the Israeli musical and vocal duo TYP (stylized as T¥P) also known as The Young Professionals.

The original album was released September 12, 2011 in Israel on Polydor label under the title 09:00 to 17:00, 17:00 to Whenever.

Months later, when the band was signed to Universal Music Group, the album was released worldwide on June 18, 2012. The album was renamed 9am to 5pm, 5pm to Whenever to comply with English language conventions about timing.

The album contains the band's first international hit "D.I.S.C.O.".

Music videos have been done for four songs from the 2012 release of the album, "D.I.S.C.O.", "Young Professionals," "Be With You Tonight," and "20 Seconds". There is also a video with art inspired by "P.O.P." and a 12-minute short film sharing the title of its featured song, "Fuck Off Berlin," which was directed by Omer Tobi for use in association with the 2013 FLY Berlin Conference.

== Track listing ==
=== 09:00 to 17:00, 17:00 to Whenever release (2011) ===
1. "With Me" (3:51)
2. "P.O.P" (5:25)
3. "Young Professionals" (4:08)
4. "Dirty Messages" (3:07)
5. "Deserve" (4:00)
6. "Rumors" (3:51)
7. "Angry Alone" (5:04)
8. "Family Value" (3:25)
9. "Bad Blood" (2:58)
10. "D.I.S.C.O" (4:06)
11. "Twenty Seconds" (3:55)
12. "Fuck Off Berlin" (3:20)
13. "Blood Makes Noise" (4:25)
14. "Wake Up" (5:37)

=== 9am to 5pm, 5pm to Whenever release (2012) ===
| No. | Title | Writer(s) | Producer(s) | Length |
|---|---|---|---|---|
| 1. | "TYP D.I.S.C.O." | Daniel Vangarde, Jean Kluger, Ivri Lider & Yonatan Goldstein | Ivri Lider, Yonatan Goldstein | 4:07 |
| 2. | "20 Seconds" | I. Lider, Y. Goldstein | I. Lider, Y. Goldstein | 3:55 |
| 3. | "Fuck off Berlin" | I. Lider, Y. Goldstein | I. Lider, Y. Goldstein | 3:20 |
| 4. | "Gucci Gun" | I. Lider, Y. Goldstein | I. Lider, Y. Goldstein, Yoad Nevo | 3:29 |
| 5. | "Be With You Tonight" | I. Lider, Y. Goldstein | I. Lider, Y. Goldstein, Julien Carret | 3:52 |
| 6. | "Wake Up" | I. Lider, Y. Goldstein | I. Lider, Y. Goldstein | 5:37 |
| 7. | "With Me" | I. Lider, Y. Goldstein | I. Lider, Y. Goldstein | 3:51 |
| 8. | "P.O.P." | I. Lider, Y. Goldstein | I. Lider, Y. Goldstein | 5:25 |
| 9. | "Young Professionals" | I. Lider, Y. Goldstein | I. Lider, Y. Goldstein | 4:08 |
| 10. | "Dirty Messages" | I. Lider, Y. Goldstein | I. Lider, Y. Goldstein | 3:07 |
| 11. | "Deserve" | I. Lider, Y. Goldstein | I. Lider, Y. Goldstein | 4:00 |
| 12. | "Video Games" | Justin Parker, Lana Del Rey | I. Lider, Y. Goldstein | 3:46 |
| Total length: | | | | 49:43 |

=== Deluxe Edition ===
9am to 5pm, 5pm to Whenever (Deluxe)

Studio album by The Young Professionals
- Released: June 18, 2012 (international)
- Recorded: 2011
- Genres: Alternative pop, dance music
- Length: 60:02
- Label: Polydor / Universal Music

Deluxe edition additional tracks
| No. | Title | Writer(s) | Producer(s) | Length |
|---|---|---|---|---|
| 13. | "Rumors" | I. Lider, Y. Goldstein | I. Lider, Y. Goldstein | 3:51 |
| 14. | "Angry Alone" | I. Lider, Y. Goldstein | I. Lider, Y. Goldstein | 5:04 |
| 15. | "Family Values" | I. Lider | I. Lider, Y.Goldstein | 3:25 |
| Total length: | | | | 60:02 |

=== Bonus ===
iTunes Store bonus track
| No. | Title | Writer(s) | Producer(s) | Length |
|---|---|---|---|---|
| 16. | "TYP D.I.S.C.O (Offer Nissim and Mr. Black Remix)" | Daniel Vangarde, Jean Kluger, I. Lider, Y. Goldstein | Offer Nissim, Mr. Black | 5:41 |
| Total length: | | | | 65:43 |

== Charts ==
| Chart (2012) | Peak position |
|---|---|
| SNEP French Albums Chart | 114 |
