= Cuba (song) =

Single by Gibson Brothers

from the album Cuba
- B-side: "Cuba" (instrumental)
- Released: 1977, 1980 (re-issue)
- Genre: Disco, Latin
- Length: 3:00 (Short Single Version); 4:20 (Long Single Version); 7:28 (Album Version); 7:45 (12" Version)
- Label: Island
- Songwriters: Jean Kluger, Daniel Vangarde
- Producer: Daniel Vangarde

Gibson Brothers singles chronology
"Heaven" (1977)	"Cuba" (1977)	"Ooh What a Life" (1979)

Music video
- "Gibson Brothers - Cuba" on YouTube

"Cuba" is a 1977 song by French musical group Gibson Brothers, released as the first single from their fourth album of the same name (1977). It was the group's first charting single: In the US, "Cuba", went to #81 on the US Billboard Hot 100, and #9 on the Billboard Dance chart. Outside the US, upon its original release, it reached number one in Finland, and was a top 30 hit in Belgium, the Netherlands and West Germany. It also peaked at number 41 in the UK in March 1979, however, following the success of their follow-up top 10 hit songs "Ooh, What a Life" and "Que Sera Mi Vida (If You Should Go)", it was re-released in early 1980 as a double A side single with album track "Better Do It Salsa", reaching number 12 in the UK. Additionally, a remix ("Cuba '88") peaked at number 78 in the UK in October 1988.

Chart (1978–1980)	Peak position
Belgium (Ultratop Flanders)	25
Finland (Suomen virallinen lista)	1
Netherlands (Dutch Top 40)	32
Netherlands (Single Top 100)	30
UK Singles (OCC)	12*
US Billboard Hot 100	81
US Disco Top 100 (Billboard)	9
US Hot R&B (Billboard)	64
West Germany (Official German Charts)	22

(*Only after re-release in 1980)

== Popular culture ==
- The song is featured in the background in a scene in the 1979 film North Dallas Forty and in the 2000 film Sexy Beast.
