= First Time (Maya Simantov album) =

Album by Maya Simantov and Offer Nissim

Studio album by Offer Nissim featuring Maya Simantov
- Released: 18 May 2005
- Recorded: 2004–2005
- Genres: House, dance, electronica
- Length: 1:19:05
- Labels: Star 69, IMP Dance; IMP 2004
- Producer: Offer Nissim

Offer Nissim featuring Maya Simantov chronology
Searching (2004)	First Time (2005)	Second Time (2006)

First Time is the debut album by Israeli singer Maya Simantov, released in 2005, with production by DJ Offer Nissim. It was recorded at Studio U-Turn Tel-Aviv, between 2004 and 2005, with additional production Yinon Yahel; and it is composed of ten songs in English and one in Hebrew. Maya wrote the lyrics and composed the melody of the songs, except "Summer Night City", which was composed by Benny Andersson and Björn Ulvaeus.

The album was a worldwide hit, as far as House music is concerned, succeeding mainly in France, Mexico, United States, Brazil and Greece, thanks to the powerful beats of Offer, Maya's beautiful voice and catchy melodies. "First Time" was well received, and was awarded recognition as one of the best albums of all time in Israel. At that time, Maya surprised who listened to one success after another, and their extended circle of fans every day. Maya was able to excite the audience with every performance and caught the attention of many internationally renowned DJs, producers and executives. Among them, the Grammy-winning producer and owner of Star69 Records: Peter Rauhofer.

== Track listing ==
Israeli edition, 2005

1. "On My Own" - 8:28
2. "Alone" - 8:24
3. "Rain" - 8:02
4. "Searching" - 7:45
5. "Only You" - 7:59
6. "Summer Night City" - 7:46
7. "That's The Way I Like It" - 3:57
8. "Heartbreaking" - 6:42
9. "First Time" - 7:10
10. "All The World" - 4:49 (Hebrew; "Kol Haolam")
11. "Anything (Sinai Tribal Mix)" - 8:00

American edition, 2005

1. "Intro"
2. "Searching"
3. "Alone"
4. "First Time"
5. "Rain"
6. "Anything"
7. "Only You"
8. "Heart Breaking"
9. "Summer Night City"
10. "That’s the Way I Like It"
