= Offer Nissim =

Israeli DJ and record producer

Offer Nissim עופר ניסים
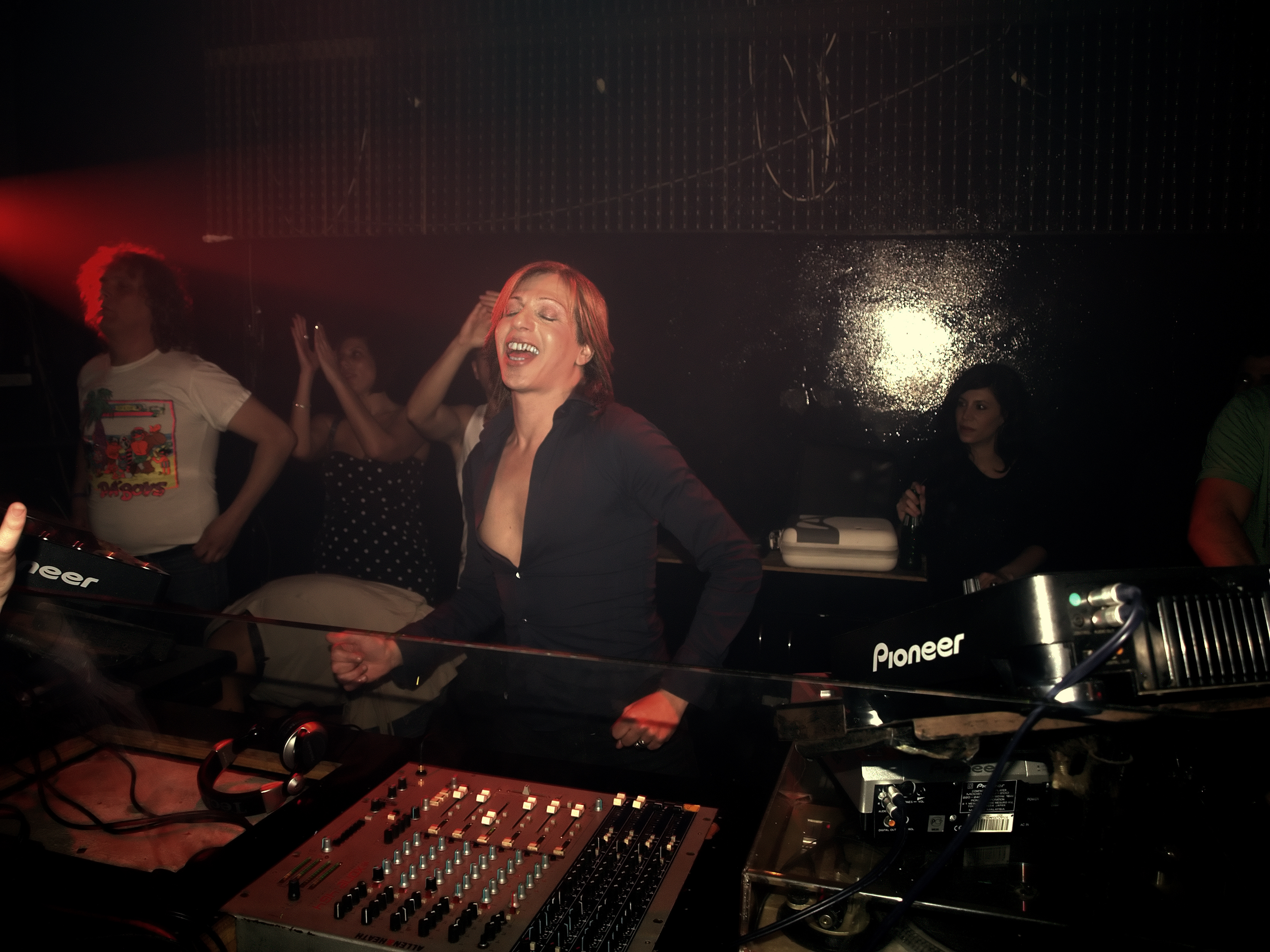
- Offer Nissim spinning at TLV nightclub in Tel Aviv, Israel

Background information
- Origin: Israel
- Genres: Progressive house; tribal house; trance
- Years active: 1993–present
- Labels: IMP; Star 69; Offer Nissim
- Website: www.offernissim.com

Offer Nissim (Hebrew: עופר ניסים) is an Israeli DJ, remixer, and record producer. He produced the winning entry of the Eurovision Song Contest 1998, "Diva", by Dana International. Besides his work with Dana International, Nissim has often collaborated with Maya Simantov on songs such as "For your Love", "Everybody Needs a Man", "Alone", and "First Time", and has produced official remixes for various artists, including Madonna and Cher.

== Biography and career ==
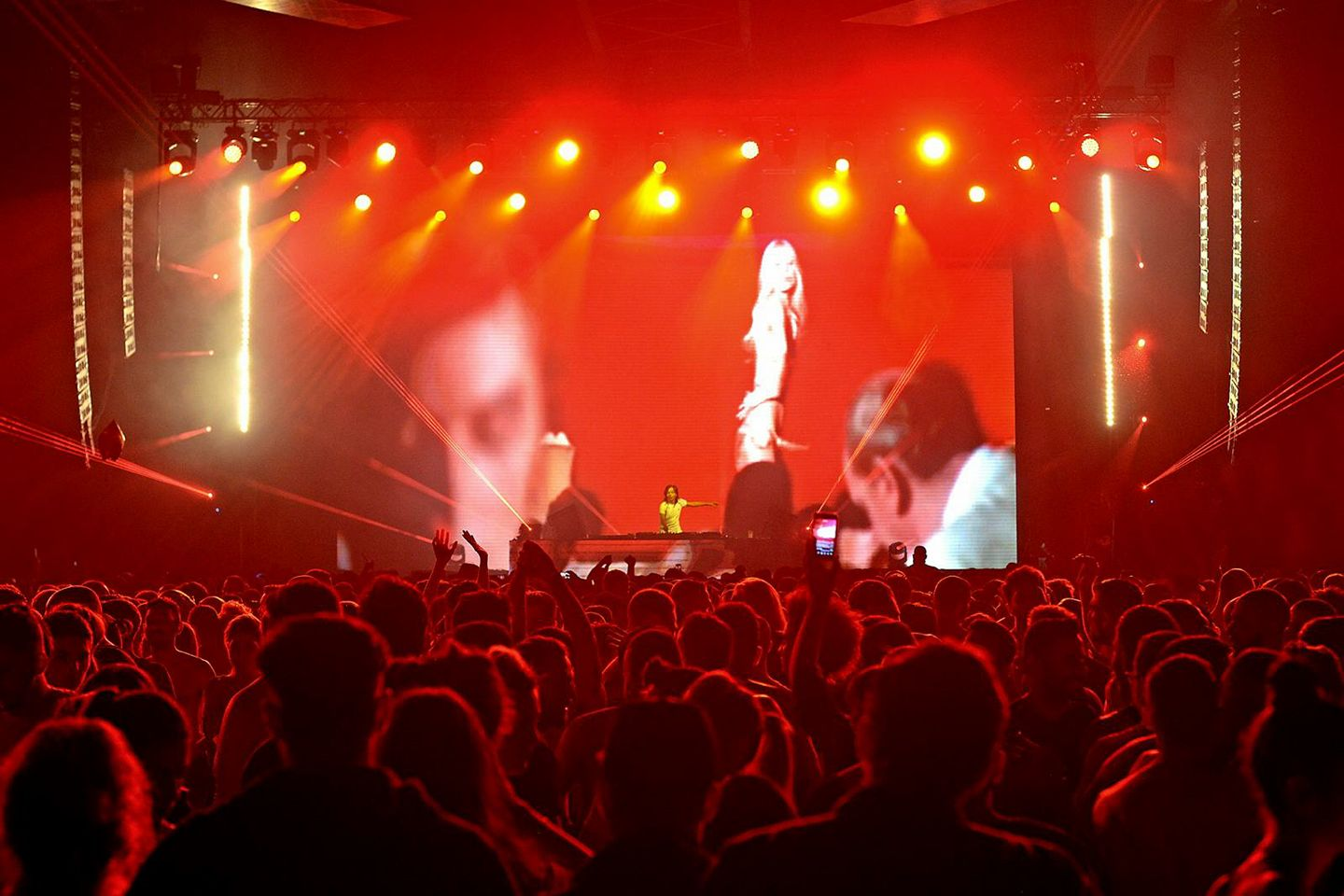
Offer Nissim perform at Haoman 17 in Tel Aviv, Israel

Offer Nissim was born in Israel on 1964, the eldest of 3 children to parents of Iraqi-Jewish descent. He displayed a keen interest in music from a young age. His musical career started in 1979, when he had to stand in for an absent DJ at Tel Aviv's Theater Club. The Theater Club was also the place where, during the following decade, he formed important professional relationships, among them with Dana International.

In 1993, Nissim produced Dana International's debut single, "Saida Sultana", and the pair was soon invited to appear with the song on Rivka Michaeli's popular prime time variety show, Siba La’mesiba (“Reason to party”). Following a record deal with IMP, Nissim produced two albums for Dana International: her 1993 debut and Umpatampa (1994).

In 1998, Dana International represented Israel at the 43rd Eurovision Song Contest with "Diva", a song written by Svika Pick and produced by Nissim. The song won the contest bringing the country its coveted third victory and Offer Nissim further recognition. However, soon after the victory, Nissim and Dana International went their separate ways as a result of artistic differences. Already an established DJ on the local gay scene, Nissim stopped producing and became a full-time DJ.

In the 2000s, Nissim collaborated with Israeli singer Maya Simantov and Grammy-winning Austrian-American DJ Peter Rauhofer. Nissim has produced several official remixes for Madonna, Pet Shop Boys, Christina Aguilera, Cher, Mylène Farmer, Deborah Cox, Dana International, Kristine W and other dance pop acts.

Nissim has ranked four times on DJ Magazine's annual list of Top 100 DJs: in 2006 (29th), in 2007 (56th), in 2008 (51st) and in 2009 (43rd).

== Discography ==
=== Albums ===
List of Albums by Offer Nissim
Year	Title	Notes
2002	Excited	
2004	Searching	2 CDs - Released: 1.3.2004
2005	First Time	ft. Maya Simantov - Released: 9.6.2005
2005	OfferNissim	
2005	The Remixes	
2006	Second Time	ft. Maya Simantov (2 CDs)
2007	Forever Tel Aviv	2 CDs - Released: 29.1.2007
2008	Happy People	2 CDs - Released: 11.5.2008
2009	Happy People (Winter Edition) - Released: 10.12.2008	
2009	*69 Presenets: Offer Nissim - Remixed	2 CDs - Released: 17.11.2009
2010	Pride All Over	Released: 15.6.2010
2010	Over You	ft. Maya Simantov - Released: 1.7.2010
2017	Love	2 CDs - Released: 12.12.2017
2020	SuperNatural	Digital release 18.12.2020
2024	Offer Nissim	2 CDs - Release: Digital: 2.6.2024 - Clear vinyl: 9.1.2025
2026	Let Me Tell You Something	Released: 8.1.2026

=== DJ Sets / Podcasts ===
List of DJ Sets / Podcasts by Offer Nissim
Year	Title	Notes
2006	Live @ Roxy (The Main Event)	
2009	We Can!	
2012	MDNA Live Show	
2012	Holidays 2012	
2013	Holidays 2013	
2014	This is Pride 2014	
2015	This is Pride 2015	
2016	This is Pride 2016	
2016	Holidays 2016	
2017	This is Pride 2017	
2018	This Is Pride 2018	
2019	This Is Pride 2019	
2021	This Is Pride 2021	
2022	Offer Nissim - Happy Pink Purim	
2022	Independence Day 2022 - Special Edition For GLZ Radio	
2022	This Is Pride 2022	
2023	This Is Pride 2023	
2026	Offer Nissim - Let Me Tell You Something (Hanukkah 2025 Podcast)	
2026	This Is Pride 2026	

== Production credits ==
Offer Nissim Productions for Dana International
Year	Title	Type	Notes
1993	Dana International	Album	
1994	UMPATAMPA	Album	
1995	E.P. Tampa	E.P.	
1996	Maganona	Album	
1996	Cinquemilla	Single	
1998	Diva	Single	Winning song of Eurovision 1998
1999	Free	Album	
1999	Free	Single	
1999	Woman In Love	Single	
2016	We Can Make It	Single	

Original Tracks/Productions by Offer Nissim
Song name	Performance Credit	Year
Well, Well, Well (You Smell Like Hell)	Offer Nissim ft. Lee, Laa, Loo Girls (Volume 9 Compilation)	1995
Now Is The Time	Offer Nissim ft. Sonny	2001/2
I'm So Excited	Offer Nissim ft. Mickiyagi	2001/2
Love Takes You	Offer Nissim ft. Mickiyagi	2003
Desert Star (כוכב המדבר)	Offer Nissim ft. Yael Bar Zohar (Produced for the Festigal)	2003
That's The Way I Like It	Offer Nissim ft. Maya Simantov	2004
Searching	Offer Nissim ft. Maya Simantov	2004
Only You	Offer Nissim ft. Maya Simantov	2004
Alone	Offer Nissim ft. Maya Simantov	2005
Anything	Offer Nissim ft. Maya Simantov	2005
First Time	Offer Nissim ft. Maya Simantov	2005
Rain	Offer Nissim ft. Maya Simantov	2005
Heartbreaking	Offer Nissim ft. Maya Simantov	2005
Summer Night City	Offer Nissim ft. Maya Simantov	2005
KOL HA'OLAM (כל העולם)	Offer Nissim ft. Maya Simantov	2005
On My Own	Offer Nissim ft. Maya Simantov	2005
Piece of My Heart	Offer Nissim vs. Intermission	2005
I Want More	Offer Nissim ft. Amuka	2005
Perfect Love	Offer Nissim ft. Maya Simantov	2006
Be My Boyfriend	Offer Nissim ft. Maya Simantov	2006
For Your Love (Full Vocal Mix / Perfect Club Mix)	Offer Nissim ft. Maya Simantov	2006
First Time (When I'm With You Ver.)	Offer Nissim ft. Maya Simantov	2006
Eastern Drums	Offer Nissim presents Fairuz	2006
Nights in White Satin	Offer Nissim ft. Ivri Lider	2007
Always	Offer Nissim ft. Amir Fay-Guttman	2007
Wild is The Wind	Offer Nissim ft. Assaf Amdursky	2007
Wish You Were Here	Offer Nissim ft. Maya Simantov	2007
Happy People	Offer Nissim ft. Maya Simantov	2008
I'm In Love	Offer Nissim ft. Maya Simantov	2008
Why	Offer Nissim ft. Maya Simantov	2008
Love	Offer Nissim ft. Maya Simantov	2008
Cha Cha Cha	Offer Nissim	2008
Change	Offer Nissim (vocals: Ohad Heim)	2008
Out Of My Skin	Offer Nissim ft. Epiphony	2008
Believe In Me	Offer Nissim ft. Epiphony	2008
One More Night	Offer Nissim ft. Epiphony	2008
Knowing Me Knowing You	Offer Nissim ft. Epiphony	2008
Remember My Name	Offer Nissim ft. Symphony Extreme	2008
I Close My Eyes	Offer Nissim ft. Symphony Extreme	2008
LATET (לתת) - Reconsturcition	Offer Nissim Presents Ofra Haza	2008
LATET (לתת); Reconsturcition Dub Mix / Fairuz Mashup	Offer Nissim Presents Ofra Haza	2009
Bimbo	Offer Nissim	2009
Rhythm Of The Nile	Offer Nissim	2009
Hook Up	Offer Nissim ft. Maya Simantov	2009
Illusion	Offer Nissim ft. Maya Simantov	2009
You'll Never Know	Offer Nissim ft. Maya Simantov	2009
Tel-Aviv	Offer Nissim ft. Maya Simantov	2009
Superman	Offer Nissim ft. Maya Simantov	2009
Holding on	Offer Nissim ft. Maya Simantov	2009
Cuando	Offer Nissim ft. Maya Simantov	2009
You Stepped Into My Life (Unreleased)	Offer Nissim ft. Suzanne Palmer	2009
Story Ending	Offer Nissim ft. Epiphony	2009
Mr. Charming	Offer Nissim ft. Epiphony	2010
Boxing Ring	Offer Nissim ft. Epiphony	2010
Yeni Ben (Out Of My Skin; Turkish version)	Offer Nissim ft. Epiphony & Yosi Geron	2010
Over You	Offer Nissim ft. Maya Simantov	2010
It Was Love	Offer Nissim ft. Maya Simantov	2010
I'm That Chick	Offer Nissim ft. Maya Simantov	2010
The Only One	Offer Nissim ft. Maya Simantov	2010
You Were So Right	Offer Nissim ft. Maya Simantov	2010
Essi (It's Five O'clock)	Offer Nissim ft. Shlomi Saranga	2010
The One and Only	Offer Nissim ft. Nikka	2010
Freedom to Ya'All	Offer Nissim ft. Mickiyagi	2010
My Only One	Offer Nissim ft. Maya Simantov	2010
You Stepped Into My Life	Offer Nissim ft. Maya Simantov & Suzanne Palmer	2010
Million Stars	Offer Nissim ft. Epiphony	2010
Freak Control	Offer Nissim ft. Maya Simantov	2011
LA BEZ	Offer Nissim ft. Maya Simantov	2011
Love Child	Offer Nissim ft. Maya Buskila, Meital & Maya	2011
Heaven In Your Eyes	Offer Nissim & Itay Kalderon ft. Meital De Razon	2011
Break My World	Offer Nissim ft. Epiphony	2011
Breaking Away	Offer Nissim ft. Maya Simantov & Vanesa Klein	2011
The Children	Offer Nissim pres. The Dynasty Season	2011
Don't Stop The Dance	Offer Nissim ft. Omri Mizrahi	2011
I'd Give You All I Have (Unreleased)	Offer Nissim ft. Maya Simantov	2011
Divine	Offer Nissim ft. Maya Simantov	2011
Hands On	Offer Nissim ft. Epiphony & Gabriel Butler	2011
Non, Je Ne Regrette Rien	Offer Nissim ft. Ilan Peled	2011
Do You Feel (Original Dub Mix/Reconstruction)	Offer Nissim	2011
Barcelona	Offer Nissim	2011
All The Love	Offer Nissim ft. Maya Simantov	2012
Over & Over	Offer Nissim & Itay Kalderon ft. Maya Simantov	2012
Désenchantée	Offer Nissim ft. Amir Haddad	2012
My Pride	Offer Nissim ft. Meital De Razon	2012
On The Radio	Offer Nissim & Asi Tal ft. Meital De Razon	2012
Gracias A La Vida	Offer Nissim & Itay Kalderon Feat. Ortega (vocals by Betty)	2012
Osa Osa	Offer Nissim	2013
Breath	Offer Nissim & Asi Tal ft. Maya Simantov	2013
Haw Haw	Offer Nissim ft. Ilan Peled	2013
You Stepped (Into My Life) (2013 Remix)	Offer Nissim ft. Suzanne Palmer	2013
Hang On Sloopy	Offer Nissim Presents David Porter	2013
Eshal	Offer Nissim ft. Eyal Golan	2013
Down On Me (Unreleased): Recorded as 'Everybody Needs a Man'; Reissued in 2023 Pride Podcast	Offer Nissim ft. Dana International / Offer Nissim X Dana International	2014
Danger Love	Offer Nissim ft. Maya Simantov	2014
Everybody Needs A Man	Offer Nissim ft. Maya Simantov	2014
End to Start	Offer Nissim & Asi Tal ft. Meital De-Razon	2014
Aprikose	Offer Nissim ft. Ilan Peled	2014
Let Me Live	Offer Nissim ft. Maya Simantov (Unreleased: ft. Maya Simantov & Rita)	2015
C’est Coccinelle	Offer Nissim ft. Ilan Peled (Unreleased version: ft. Ilan Peled & Yael Poliakov)	2015
Cold Song (Oscar Wilde Tribute) (Parts 1+2+3)	Offer Nissim ft. Vladi Blayberg	2015
Wake Up	Offer Nissim ft. Maya Simantov	2015
I Wanna Be With You	Offer Nissim ft. Cim W.	2015
Love U Till I Die	Offer Nissim ft. Sarit Hadad	2015
Hot Summer Nights	Offer Nissim & Yinon Yahel	2015
Whole Lotta Love	Offer Nissim VS Led Zeppelin	2016
Open Up (Unreleased)	Offer Nissim ft. Maya Simantov	2016
Udrub (Offer Nissim Mix)	Offer Nissim ft. Ilan Peled	2016
Sex	Offer Nissim	2016
You Need My Love	Offer Nissim ft. Zach Adam	2016
Hot Summer Night	Offer Nissim ft. Maya Simantov	2015
We Can Make It	Offer Nissim ft. Dana International	2016
My Air	Offer Nissim presents Deborah Cox	2016
I'm A Whore Machine	Offer Nissim presents Ilan Peled	2016
Miracle (Part A & B)	Offer Nissim ft. Maya Simantov	2017
ROKEDET (רוקדת)	Offer Nissim ft. Ania Bukstein	2017
Feel It	Offer Nissim ft. Gila Goldstein	2017
Africa	Offer Nissim	2017
Ain't No Mountain High Enough	Offer Nissim Pres. The Bitches - Ilan Peled, Harel Skaat, Maya Simantov & Keren Mor	2017
If You Only Knew	Offer Nissim ft. Maya Simantov	2017
Completely Yourself	Offer Nissim	2017
Umpatampa	Offer Nissim	2017
Good Night Europe	Offer Nissim ft. Sailo	2017
YELED O GEVER (ילד או גבר)	Offer Nissim ft. Ania Bukstein	2017
Deserve Love	Offer Nissim ft. Maya Simantov	2017
Cheating Love	Offer Nissim ft. Maya Simantov	2017
Gotta Be Cool	Offer Nissim ft. Sailo	2017
Tragedy	Offer Nissim ft. Sailo	2017
I Turn To You	Offer Nissim ft. Meital De Razon	2017
Zolushka I Belosnejka	Offer Nissim ft. Ilan Peled	2017
ALAI (עליי)	Offer Nissim ft. Rita (Israeli singer)	2017
Fame	Offer Nissim ft. Riki Ben-Ari	2018
My Pussy Hurts	Offer Nissim ft. Ilan Peled	2018
Rainbow	Offer Nissim ft. Maya Simantov	2018
Fucker	Offer Nissim	2018
Shalom Aleychem	Offer Nissim	2018
Open Your Eyes (Unreleased)	Offer Nissim	2018
Up To The Top (Unreleased)	Offer Nissim	2018
Pot Pot	Offer Nissim ft. Ilan Peled	2018
Heart Beat	Offer Nissim ft. Maya Simantov	2018
Lord Of Mercy	Offer Nissim ft. Nasrin Kadri	2018
Saved Me (Unreleased)	Offer Nissim ft. Meital De Razon	2018
Forgive Me	Offer Nissim ft. Sailo	2018
Dance The Night	Offer Nissim ft. Riki Ben-Ari	2018
Dancing	Offer Nissim Presents SJ Jackson & AJ Jackson	2018
LO MEVINA IVRIT (לא מבינה עברית)	Offer Nissim ft. Eyal Golan	2018
Kriminal Eye	Offer Nissim ft. Ivana Lola	2018
Mushi Mushi	Offer Nissim ft. Ilan Peled	2018
Set My Mind Free	Offer Nissim	2018
Esther	Offer Nissim	2019
Ahasuerus	Offer Nissim	2019
SHUFUNI (שופוני)	Offer Nissim X Sarit Hadad	2019
Hymns To God (Unreleased)	Offer Nissim	2019
Come Out	Offer Nissim ft. Maya Simantov	2019
Crazy Things At Night	Offer Nissim	2019
Born To Dance	Offer Nissim ft. Zach Adam & Riki Ben Ari	2019
Sing From Your Pussy	Offer Nissim ft. Yael Poliakov & Ilan Peled ("The Tricksters" - "הנוכלות")	2019
Better Man	Offer Nissim ft. Meital De Razon & Riki Ben-Ari	2019
A Relationship With A Man	Offer Nissim	2019
Equality	Offer Nissim X Ania Bukstein	2019
Who Wants To Live Forever	Offer Nissim X Ninet Tayeb	2019
City Lights	Offer Nissim ft. Jonathan Mergui	2019
Human	Offer Nissim ft. Ninet Tayeb	2020
HATIKVA (התקווה)	Barbra Streisand X Rita - Offer Nissim	2020
Show Me Love	Offer Nissim ft. Robin S.	2020
Like A Woman	Offer Nissim ft. Maya Simantov	2020
La Talya	Offer Nissim	2020
Mucho Bien (Reconstruction Mix)	Mr. Black & Offer Nissim	2020
Bombay	Offer Nissim	2020
Hubby	Offer Nissim ft. Nasrin Kadri	2020
Pour Toute La Nuit	Offer Nissim	2020
Fire With Fire	Offer Nissim ft. Maya Simantov	2020
Lost In Music	Offer Nissim	2020
Vassou	Offer Nissim ft. Ilan Peled	2020
Supernatural	Offer Nissim Presents Mitka	2020
I Love To Love	Offer Nissim X Eden Fines	2020
Stronger Than The Wind	Rita X Offer Nissim	2021
Like There's No Tomorrow	Offer Nissim ft. Maya Simantov	2021
Infected Love (Unreleased)	Offer Nissim (Dub Vocals by Marina Maximilian)	2021
Studio 54 (Unreleased)	Offer Nissim	2021
AHAVA NAFSHI (אהבה נפשי)	Offer Nissim ft. Harel Skaat	2021
ELAI (אלי)	Offer Nissim X Zehava Ben	2021
Summer Of Love	Offer Nissim ft. Deborah Cox	2021
I Can't Sleep At Night	Offer Nissim ft. Riki Ben Ari	2021
MAYIM (מים)	Offer Nissim ft. Masaki Durian & Ilan Peled	2021
Like A Mouse	Offer Nissim ft. Ilan Peled	2021
Kol Doudi	Offer Nissim ft. Betty	2021
Show Me Love - Offer Nissim Pride Version - Vox By SAILO	Offer Nissim & Mr. Black	2021
Kissed By You	Offer Nissim ft. Ivana Lola	2021
Like This Like That	Offer Nissim ft. Meital De Razon	2022
Zero Fucks	Offer Nissim ft. Maya Simantov	2022
Viado Presidente	Offer Nissim Ft. Ilan Peled	2022
We Are Drunk	Offer Nissim X Netta Barzilai	2022
Falan Filan	Offer Nissim Presents Linet & Ilan Peled	2022
SHOSHANAT YAAKOV (שושנת יעקב)	Offer Nissim Ft. Rivka Zohar	2022
Laila	Offer Nissim X Tair Haim	2022
VAROD MAVRIK (ורוד מבריק)	Offer Nissim ft. Aviv Geffen & Ella Lee	2022
Boys	Offer Nissim ft. Maya Simantov	2022
Bitch	Offer Nissim ft. Maya Simantov	2022
Atencion Alegria	Offer Nissim	2022
Fly Robin Fly	Offer Nissim (Silver Convention)	2022
MESUCHSECHET (מסוכסכת)	Offer Nissim ft. Ilan Peled	2022
Move Your Body	Offer Nissim	2022
LO LEVAD (לא לבד)	Offer Nissim X Tal Ramon	2022
High In Bed	Offer Nissim	2022
MALKAT HA'RAHAVA (מלכת הרחבה)	Ran Danker & Offer Nissim	2022
Get What I Want	Offer Nissim	2022
I Want Muscles	Offer Nissim	2022
Underground	Offer Nissim	2022
Let God	Offer Nissim ft. Maya Simantov	2022
BA'LEILOT (בלילות)	Offer Nissim X Odeya	2023
Our Love	Offer Nissim X Tamir Grinberg	2023
Welcome	Offer Nissim	2023
Lusi	Offer Nissim ft. Nasrin Kadri	2023
Hubby (Show Mix)	Offer Nissim ft. Nasrin Kadri	2023
Liberté	Offer Nissim X Nasrin Kadri & Ilan Peled	2023
Don't Know What To Do (Unreleased)	Offer Nissim	2023
Hypno Dance	Offer Nissim ft. Ilan Peled	2023
Free To Change	Offer Nissim ft. Ilan Peled	2023
Down On Me	Offer Nissim X Dana International	2023
Aphrodite	Yehuda Poliker X Offer Nissim	2023
Heart Attack	Offer Nissim ft. Maya Simantov	2023
One Min Before We All Die	Offer Nissim ft. Ilan Peled	2023
Keep On Dancing	Offer Nissim	2023
Feel Free	Offer Nissim	2023
Turn Up The Heat	Offer Nissim X Netta Barzilai	2023
NISBATA AEMONIM (נשבעת אמונים)	Offer Nissim & Firqat Alnoor X Eden Ben Zaken	2023
AEDON HA'SELICHOT (אדון הסליחות)	Offer Nissim & Firqat Alnoor X Benaia Barabi	2023
What's Done Is Done (מה שהיה היה)	Offer Nissim & Arik Einstein	2024
Adagio	Offer Nissim & Ofra Haza	2024
Toro	Offer Nissim	2024
How Deep Is Your Love	Offer Nissim	2024
Goddess	Offer Nissim & Maya Simantov	2024
You Take Me Higher	Offer Nissim	2024
When I Come Alive	Offer Nissim	2024
When The Music Dies	Offer Nissim & Sailo	2024
Reach Out	Offer Nissim & 2050	2024
Saturday Night	Offer Nissim	2024
Listen To My Heart	Offer Nissim	2024
Can You Feel It	Offer Nissim	2024
Little Space	Offer Nissim	2024
SHUVA (שובה)	Offer Nissim ft. Boruch Sholom & Ilan Peled	2024
Come Back Home	Offer Nissim & Maya Simantov	2024
Doctor (Show Mix)	Offer Nissim X Noa Kirel	2024
SIPUR ACHER (סיפור אחר)	Offer Nissim X Sasson Shaulov	2024
Gypsy Lady (Tribute/Unreleased)	ADAM X Offer Nissim X Ilan Peled	2024
Everything Is Meaningless	Offer Nissim	2025
Hysterical	Offer Nissim ft. Maya Simantov	2025
Rose	Offer Nissim	2025
PGISHA (פגישה)	Offer Nissim X Margol (Margalit Tzan'ani) & Or Ben David	2025
Let's Fly (Show Mix)	Offer Nissim X Ilan Peled	2025
Never See Me Again	Offer Nissim ft. Nikka	2025
The Sphinx (Unreleased)	Offer Nissim	2025
You Raise Me Up (Unreleased)	Offer Nissim	2025
Pieces	Offer Nissim X Eden Golan	2025
Tutta La Vita	Offer Nissim ft. Ilan Peled & Static	2025
Desert Star 2025 (כוכב המדבר)	Offer Nissim ft. Yael Bar Zohar	2025
TITRAGEL EITA (תתרגל איתה)	Offer Nissim ft. Magi Azarzar	2025
MOSHLEMET EIM SRITA (מושלמת עם שריטה)	Offer Nissim X Rinat Bar	2025
Who Is She (Unreleased)	Offer Nissim ft. Maya Simantov	2025
Slay	Offer Nissim ft. Riki Ben-Ari	2025
California Dreaming (Unreleased)	Offer Nissim	2025
Tac Oh Tertako	Offer Nissim ft. Ilan Peled	2025
THARIH AHAVA (צריך אהבה)	Offer Nissim X Eden Hason	2025
XTC	Offer Nissim	2025
Encore (Show Mix)	Offer Nissim X Amir Haddad	2025
Bridges	Offer Nissim ft. Maya Simantov	2025
Eagle (Show Mix)	Offer Nissim X Yuval Raphael	2025
Let Me Tell You Something	Offer Nissim	2026
Naked In The Rain	Offer Nissim	2026
Come Back To Me	Offer Nissim	2026
Found Love	Offer Nissim	2026
Turn The Beat Around (Show Mix)	Offer Nissim ft. Maya Simantov	2026
Circle	Offer Nissim X Eliran Halevy	2026
TIZKOR OTI (תזכור אותי) [Show Mix & Single]	Miri Mesika X Offer Nissim	2026
Super Spreader	Offer Nissim X Megaphonim	2026
Love Again	Offer Nissim ft. Ivana Lola	2026
Blue Monday	Offer Nissim ft. Ilan Peled	2026
Mask	Offer Nissim X Udi Schneider	2026
I Can Be Whatever I Want	Offer Nissim ft. Gila Goldstein & Ilan Peled	2026
TISTAKEL LI BA'EYNAIM (תסתכל לי בעיניים)	Offer Nissim X Shiri Maimon	2026
Now Come On	Offer Nissim X Meital De Razon	2026
Fix Me	Offer Nissim X Anna Zak	2026
Midnight Summer Dream	Offer Nissim	2026
Work Children (In Memory of Peter Rauhofer) (Unreleased)	Offer Nissim X Celeda	2026
Enjoy Your Life	Offer Nissim	2026
Holy Love	Offer Nissim ft. Maya Simantov	2026
הלך גבר? יבואו עשר (HALACH GEVER? YAVO'U ESER)	Offer Nissim X Nasrin Kadri	2026
Amour Affamé	Offer Nissim X Yardena Arazi	2026
Taxis - מוניות (MONIYOT)	Offer Nissim X Lior Narkis	2026
Handyman (האנדימן)	Offer Nissim X Asulin	2026
So What You Gonna Do (Unreleased)	Offer Nissim	2026
Like a Light (Unreleased)	Offer Nissim X Betty	2026
Don't Stop (A Tribute To Michael Jackson) (Unreleased)	Offer Nissim	2026
Work	Offer Nissim X Eden Fines	2026
מתגעגע לתקופה (MITGA'AGE'A LA-TKUFA)	Offer Nissim X Eyal Golan	2026
Apollo	Offer Nissim X Udi Schneider	2026

=== Selected Remixes & Edits ===
1993

- Shlomit Aharon - Carmey Teyman - "בכרמי תימן" (Offer Nissim Remix) [Radio Mix | Trance Mix | Ethno Mix]

2002

- Rita - Ma'wal (Offer Nissim Remix)

2004

- Ivri Lider - Beautiful Eyes (Oriental Dub Remix)
- Hakan Bilal - Awara (Offer Nissim Remix)

2005

- Suzanne Palmer - Home (Offer Nissim Remix Parts 1,2,3)
- Suzanne Palmer - Fascinated (Offer Nissim Remix | Offer Nissim Intro Remix)
- Kristine W - Wonder Of It All (Offer Nissim Mix)
- Deborah Cooper - Live You All Over (Offer Nissim Remix)
- Club69 (Peter Rauhofer) - Twisted (2005 Rework) (Uncredited vocals: Suzanne Palmer)
- Deborah Cox - Easy as Life (Offer Nissim Remix)
- Rita - Jerusalem of Gold (Dub Remix)
- Ivri Lider - Cinderella Rockefella (Dub Remix)

2006

- Tony Moran - Something About You (Offer Nissim Remix Parts 1,2,3)
- Suzanne Palmer - Keep The Faith (Offer Nissim Remix)
- Angie Stone - Wish I Didn't Miss You (Offer Nissim Remix)
- Christina Aguilera - Hurt (Offer Nissim Remix)
- ABBA - SOS (Offer Nissim Remix)
- Kristine W - Be Alright (Offer Nissim Remix | Offer Nissim Intro Remix)

2007

- Beyonce - One Night Only (Offer Nissim Remix | Offer Nissim Intro Remix)
- Beyonce - Deja-Vu (Offer Nissim Remix)
- Suzanne Palmer - Free My Love (Offer Nissim Remix | Offer Nissim Intro Remix | Offer Nissim Summer Remix)
- Donna Summer - Power of Love (Offer Nissim Remix)
- Alain Chamfort - Manureva '07 (2007 Rework / Offer Nissim Presents Alain Chamfort)
- Deborah Cox - Everybody Dance (Offer Nissim Radio | Mixshow | Club)
- Amuka - Appreciate Me at Night (Offer Nissim Mash-up)
- Sarit Hadad - ZE SH'SHOMER ALAY (זה ששומר עלי) (Offer Nissim & Yinon Yahel Remix)

2008

- Shirley Bassey - La Passione (Offer Nissim Remix)
- Suzanne Palmer - Eye Can See U (Offer Nissim Remix)
- Jennifer Lopez - Que Hiciste (Offer Nissim Remix)
- Dana International - Petra (Offer Nissim 2008 Reconstruction)
- Dana International - Maganuna (Offer Nissim - Reconstruction)
- Captain Hollywood - More And More (Offer Nissim 2008 Reconstruction)
- Erin Hamilton - Flame 2008 (Offer Nissim Remix)
- Christina Aguilera - Candyman (Offer Nissim Remix)
- Betty - Poison (Offer Nissim presents Betty Pablo | Reconstruction)
- Kadoc - Night Train (Offer Nissim Edit) [Edit of "Night Train - D.O.N.S. & DBN Feat. Kadoc"]
- Culture Beat - Your Love (Offer Nissim Remix)

2009

- Yinon Yahel ft. Maya Simantov – Bringing You Home (Offer Nissim Edit)
- Johnny Hallyday - Que Je T'aime (Offer Nissim Remix) [bootleg]
- Madonna - Like A Prayer (Offer Nissim Jerusalem Prayer Mix) [bootleg]

2010

- Shoshana Damari Still Here (ADAIIN KAN - עדיין כאן) (Offer Nissim Remix)
- Ivri Lider - Fuck Off Berlin (Offer Nissim Remix)
- Anita Meyer – Why Tell Me Why (Offer Nissim Remix)
- Catherine Lara – Nuit Magique (Offer Nissim Remix)
- Flickman - Sound Of Bamboo (Offer Nissim Reconstruction Remix)
- KNOB_(duo) - I'm Lost (Offer Nissim Full Club Mix)

2011

- The Young Professionals – 20 Seconds (Offer Nissim Remix)
- Suzanne Palmer - Free My Love VS Eye Can See U – MegaMix [bootleg]
- Shlomi Saranga - Galu Lo (Offer Nissim Remix)

2012

- The Young Professionals - D.I.S.C.O (Offer Nissim Remix)
- Madonna - Girl Gone Wild (Offer Nissim Club Mix)
- Madonna - Turn Up The Radio (Offer Nissim Club Mix)
- The Young Professionals – Be With You Tonight (Offer Nissim Remix)
- The Young Professionals – Wake Up (Offer Nissim Remix)
- Meital De Razon & Asi Tal – Le Lo Le (Offer Nissim Club Mix)
- Rita (Israeli singer) – Bigharar (Offer Nissim Extended Remix)
- Offer Nissim ft. Maya Simantov – Happy People (2012 Remix)
- Offer Nissim Presents Josie Katz – After All The Love Is Gone (Radio Edit | Club Mix)
- Offer Nissim ft. Nasreen Qadri – Sawah (Offer Nissim Remix)
- Mylène Farmer - A l'ombre (Offer Nissim Remix)

2013

- Meital De Razon & Asi Tal – Toda La Noche (Offer Nissim Remix)
- Assaf Amdursky – 15 Min (Offer Nissim Remix)
- Kristine W. – Everything That I Got (Offer Nissim Tel-Aviv Mix)
- Brothers in Rhythm - Such A Good Feeling (Offer Nissim Remix) [bootleg | vocals: Charvoni Woodson]
- Mr. Black – Wake Up (Offer Nissim Remix)

2014

- Rocking Son – Moskau (Offer Nissim Remix)
- Rockers Revenge – Walking on Sunshine (Offer Nissim Remix)
- Los Chunguitos – Te Estoy Amando Locamente (Offer Nissim Remix) [bootleg]
- Eartha Kitt - Where Is My Man (Offer Nissim Remix)

2015

- Dikla – 7PM (שבע בערב) (Offer Nissim Remix)
- Madonna - Living For Love (Offer Nissim Living For Drama Remix | Offer Nissim Dub Mix | Promo Remix | Living for Drums Mix)
- Madonna – Ghosttown (Offer Nissim Drama Mix | Offer Nissim Dub Mix)
- Kim English – Missing You (Offer Nissim Remix) [bootleg]

2016

- Pet Shop Boys – The Pop Kids (Offer Nissim Drama Mix)
- Billie Ray Martin – Glittering Gutter (Offer Nissim Remix)
- Michelle Obama All-Star Girl Power Anthem – This Is For My Girls (Offer Nissim Remix)
- Ilanit – Teresa Dimon's Love (Offer Nissim Remix / 2016)
- Pet Shop Boys – Say It To Me (Offer Nissim Remix)
- Miri Paskal Ft. Firkat Al Nour - Tigi Nesam El Amar (Offer Nissim Remix)
- Nick Straker Band – A Walk In The Park (Offer Nissim Remix) [bootleg]
- Jimmy Fontana - Il Mundo (Offer Nissim Remix) [bootleg]

2017

- Vali – Ain't No Friend of Mine (Offer Nissim Remix)
- Donna Summer & Barbra Streisand - Enough is Enough 2017 (Offer Nissim Drama Remix)
- Offer Nissim ft. Extasia & Zach Adam ft. Rony G. – Light Beams (Offer Nissim Remix)
- The Trash Mermaids – Cryptic Love (Offer Nissim Remix)
- Lara Fabian – Growing Wings (Offer Nissim Remix)
- Ivana Lola ft. AC & GetFar – Don't You Hide (L.I.B.) (Offer Nissim Remix)
- Offer Nissim ft. Rivka Zohar – Il N’est Pas Comme Hier (Offer Nissim Remix)
- Offer Nissim ft. JHUD – Prayers For This World (Offer Nissim Remix)
- Hany Shaker – Ya Retni (Offer Nissim Remix) [bootleg]

2018

- U2 – Love Is Bigger Than Anything In Its Way (Offer Nissim Remix)
- The Trash Mermaids - Xperiel (Offer Nissim Remix)
- Anggun - The Good Is Back (Offer Nissim Remix)
- Jennifer Hudson - I'll Fight (Offer Nissim Remix)
- Cher - Gimme Gimme Gimme (A Man after Midnight) (Offer Nissim Needs A Man Remix)
- Miri Mesika - MEFAHED ALLAY'ICH (מפחד עלייך) (Offer Nissim Remix)

2019

- Vali - Pluto (Offer Nissim Remix)
- Madonna X Maluma - Medellín (Offer Nissim Set Me Free Remix / Madame X In The Sphinx Mix)
- Chava Alberstein - The Treasure (האוצר) (Offer Nissim Remix)
- Keren Peles - MI ANI? (?מי אני) (Offer Nissim Remix)

2020

- Madonna - I Don't Search I Find (Offer Nissim Remix)

2021

- Love De-Luxe - Here Comes That Sound (Offer Nissim Remix)[bootleg]

2022

- Deborah Cox - Easy as life (Offer Nissim Show Mix)
- Deborah Cox - Everybody Dance (Offer Nissim Show Mix)
- Offer Nissim ft. Ninet Tayeb - Human (Trance Version)
- Keren Peles - MI ANI? (?מי אני) -(Offer Nissim Dub Version)
- Rita (Israeli singer) & ELK DUENDE – Boom Boom Boom (Offer Nissim Remix / Show Mix)
- Rita (Israeli singer) & ELK - Baildor (Offer Nissim Remix)
- Dana International - ANI LO YECHOLA BILADECHA (אני לא יכולה בלעדיך) Rosh Hashana Version (2022) - Svika Pick Tribute

2023

- Amanda Lear - Follow Me (Offer Nissim Remix) [bootleg]
- Nina Hagen - New York, New York (Offer Nissim Remix) [bootleg]
- Madonna - Celebration (Offer Nissim Dub Mix) [bootleg]
- Offer Nissim ft. Dana International - Power (Show Mix)
- Offer Nissim ft. Maya Simantov - First Time (Show Mix)
- Dana International - AHLA GEVER (אחלה גבר) (Offer Nissim Show Mix)

2024

- Frank Sinatra - The World We Knew (Over and Over) - (Offer Nissim Remix) [bootleg]

2025

- Offer Nissim & Ania Bukstein - NESHIKA (נשיקה) (Offer Nissim Show Mix)
- ABBA – Summer Night City (Offer Nissim Pride 2025 Remix) [bootleg]
- Offer Nissim X Amir Haddad – Désenchantée (Show Mix 2025)
- Ninet Tayeb - KACHA ZE (ככה זה) - (Offer Nissim Remix)
- Rui da Silva - Touch Me (Offer Nissim Remix)
- Donna Summer - Sometimes Like Butterflies (Offer Nissim Remix) [bootleg]
- Donna Summer & Barbra Streisand - Enough Is Enough - (Offer Nissim - Part B Remix) [bootleg]

2026

- Madonna & Sabrina Carpenter - Bring Your Love (Offer Nissim Remix | Prayer of Love Remix - Intro Sukkot) [bootleg]
- Offer Nissim ft. Maya Simantov & Frida Uziel - Superman (Show Mix)
- Friburn & Urik - Take Me Love Me (Offer Nissim Remix) [bootleg]
- Madonna - Danceteria (Offer Nissim Remix) [bootleg]
- Offer Nissim X Betty - Poison (Show Mix)
- Offer Nissim ft. Maya Simantov - Searching ("Show Edit") [Unreleased]
- Culture Club - Victims (song) (Offer Nissim Remix) [Boy George Live Show - Tel-Aviv 7.11.2026]
