= Ooh, What a Life (song) =

1979 song performed by Gibson Brothers

Single by Gibson Brothers

from the album Cuba
- Released: 1979
- Genre: Disco
- Length: 5:45
- Label: Polydor
- Songwriter(s): Daniel Vangarde, Alex Francfort
- Producer(s): Daniel Vangarde

Gibson Brothers singles chronology
"Cuba" (1978)	"Ooh, What a Life" (1979)	"Que Sera Mi Vida (If You Should Go)" (1979)

"Ooh, What a Life" ("Ooh" on label, "Oooh" on sleeve, often "Oh" in print sources) is a 1979 song by French musical group Gibson Brothers, released as the second single from their fourth album, Cuba (1979). It was a UK No. 10 hit. English DJ and house music producer Joey Negro's 1993 debut album included a version of the song.

== Charts ==
Chart (1979)	Peak position
Finland (Suomen virallinen lista)	21
UK Singles (OCC)	10
US Hot Dance Club Play (Billboard)	48
