= Maya Simantov =

Israeli singer-songwriter

Maya Simantov מאיה סימנטוב
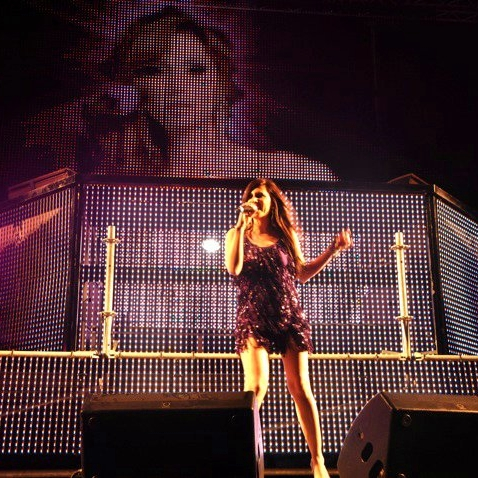
- Live performance of Maya Simantov in 2010

Background information
- Born: June 25, 1982 (age 44); Bat Yam, Israel
- Genres: progressive house; tribal house
- Occupations: Singer; songwriter
- Years active: 2004–present
- Labels: IMP; Star 69

Maya Simantov (Hebrew: מאיה סימנטוב; born June 25, 1982) is an Israeli singer and songwriter who has worked in the house music scene for over a decade. She is mostly known for her collaborations with DJ and producer Offer Nissim, such as "Everybody Needs a Man", "Let Me Live", "Alone", "Be My Boyfriend", "First Time" and more, and has written songs for recording artists such as Dana International, Rita and Sarit Hadad.

== Biography ==
She has collaborated with Peter Rauhofer, Tracy Young, DJ Skazi, Itay Kalderon (part of the duo "JetFire"), and Henree. Her most popular hit is "Take the World" was produced by Yinon Yahel.

In 2021, she participated in the fourth season of the reality show X Factor Israel, aiming to represent Israel at Eurovision 2022. Simentov passed the auditions, but was eliminated at the judges decision stage.

== Discography ==
- First Time (2005)
- Second Time (2006)
- Over You (2010)
