= Ottawan =

French disco band

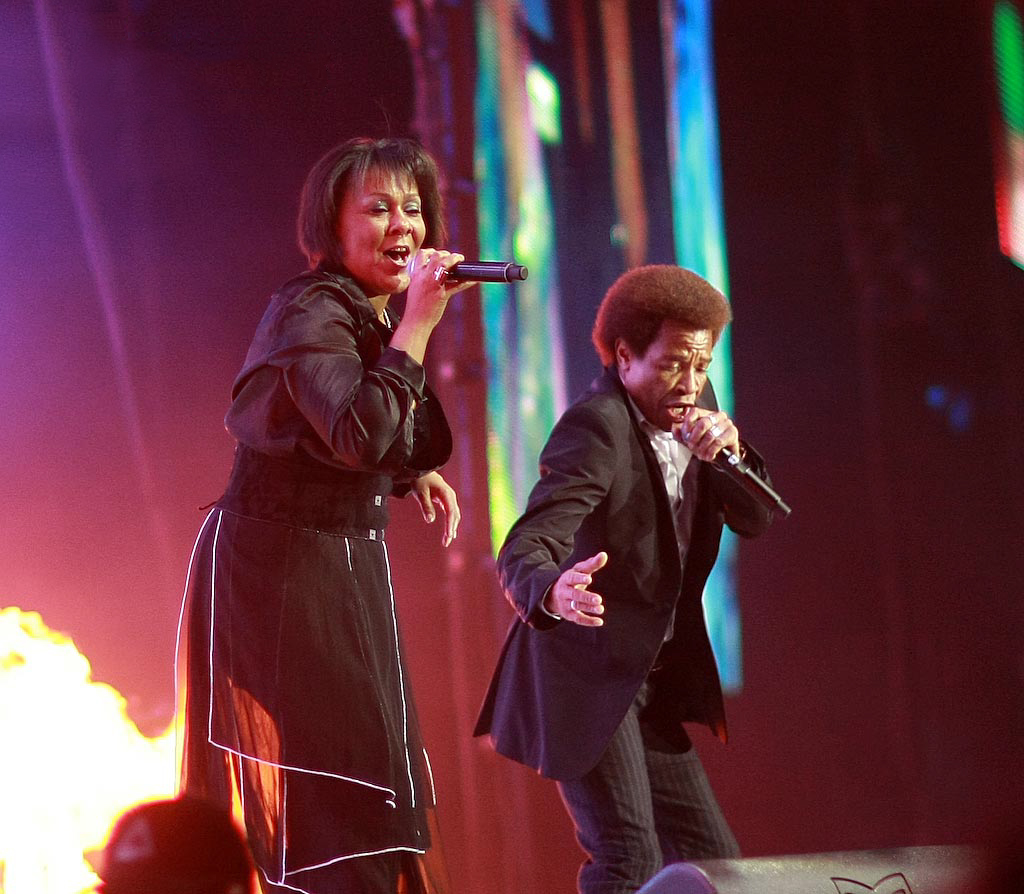
- Ottawan performing in November 2008

Background information
- Origin: France
- Genres: Synth-pop; Eurodisco
- Years active: 1979–present
- Labels: Carrere; RGE; RCA; PolyGram; Polydor; Mercury
- Members: Patrick Jean-Baptiste
- Past members: Annette Eltice
- Website: ottawanofficial.com

Ottawan are a French pop music duo, who had the hit singles "D.I.S.C.O." and "Hands Up (Give Me Your Heart)" in the early 1980s. Fronted by Patrick Jean-Baptiste and formerly Annette Eltice, the band were masterminded through a cooperation between French producer Daniel Vangarde and Belgian producer Jean Kluger.

== History ==
In 1979, Ottawan were founded by record producers Daniel Vangarde and Jean Kluger and fronted by male singer Patrick Jean-Baptiste, who was originally from Guadeloupe, and female singer Annette Eltice. Kluger and Vangarde had also scored hits with The Gibson Brothers and Sheila B. Devotion.

In the United Kingdom, they had two Top 10 hits. "D.I.S.C.O." (the act's debut single) reached number 2 in September 1980, while "Hands Up (Give Me Your Heart)" peaked at number 3 a year later. "Hands Up (Give Me Your Heart)" reached number 1 in New Zealand during 1982, staying there for eight weeks.. "Hands Up" would become a staple for Club Med's Guadalupe resort at the time of its release. The duo recorded in French as well as in English.

== Cover versions ==
The duo's hits have been covered a number of times.

UK dance act N-Trance had a number 11 hit in the UK with their pop/rap cover of D.I.S.C.O.

Canadian band Sway had a number 7 hit in Canada in 1988 with their cover of "Hands Up (Give Me Your Heart)".

Norwegian band Hype had a number 10 hit in Norway and number 7 hit in Finland in 1995 with their cover of "Hands Up".

Swedish band Army of Lovers had a number 44 hit in Sweden in 2001 with their cover of "Hands Up".

Israeli band The Young Professionals had a number 53 hit in France in 2012 with their version of "D.I.S.C.O.".

== Discography ==
=== Albums ===
| Year | Album | Peak chart positions | |
| Year | Album | GER | AUT |
|---|---|---|---|
| 1980 | D.I.S.C.O. | 30 | — |
| 1981 | 2 | — | 18 |
"—" denotes releases that did not chart.

=== Singles ===
| Year | Single | Peak chart positions | | | | | | | Certifications |
| Year | Single | UK | GER | NL | BEL | NOR | AUT | IRL | Certifications |
|---|---|---|---|---|---|---|---|---|---|
| 1979 | "D.I.S.C.O." | 2 | 2 | 1 | 2 | 1 | 4 | 2 | BPI: Silver |
| 1980 | "You're OK" | 56 | 17 | — | — | — | — | — | |
| 1980 | "Shalalala Song" | — | 73 | — | — | — | — | — | |
| 1980 | "Haut les mains (donne-moi ton cœur)" | — | — | — | 32 | — | — | — | |
| 1981 | "Hands Up (Give Me Your Heart)" | 3 | 2 | 5 | 4 | 1 | 3 | 1 | BPI: Silver |
| 1981 | "Crazy Music" | — | 26 | — | — | — | 19 | — | |
| 1981 | "Qui va garder mon crocodile cet été?" | — | — | — | 23 | — | — | — | |
| 1981 | "Help, Get Me Some Help" | 49 | — | — | — | — | — | — | |
| 1982 | "Hello Rio!" | — | — | — | — | — | — | — | |
| 1982 | "Top Secret" | — | — | — | — | — | — | — | |
"—" denotes releases that did not chart or were not released in that territory.
