= Nelly Byl =

- Born: 25 March 1919; Molenbeek-Saint-Jean, Belgium
- Died: 30 November 2011 (aged 92) Uccle, Belgium
- Genres: Pop
- Occupation: Songwriter

Nelly Antoinette Byl (25 March 1919 – 30 November 2011) was a Belgian songwriter, who wrote over 2000 songs in Dutch and other languages. She was born in Molenbeek-Saint-Jean.

Byl died in Uccle, aged 92.

== Songwriter ==
Byl is best known, as a songwriter for Will Tura (including the Christmas hit "Alle dagen Kerstmis"), Marva ("Niemand wil je als je ongelukkig bent", "Oempalapapero", "Rode rozen in de sneeuw"), Ann Christy, Paul Severs, Jimmy Frey, Robert Cogoi and other Belgian artists. Through music publisher Jean Kluger, she came into contact with Will Tura, for whom she wrote almost all the lyrics. She wrote the lyrics for dozens of Flemish number 1 hits, including "Zo Mooi, Zo Blond en Zo Alleen" and "Rozen voor Sandra" by Jimmy Frey and Will Tura's "Vergeet Barbara" and "Hopeloos".

Internationally, she was co-responsible for the mega-hit "Que Sera, Mi Vida" by the Gibson Brothers, which sold over five million copies, and wrote the lyrics for hits by Blackblood ("Kiswahili", 1975), Ottawan ("Hello Rio!", "Shalala Song", 1980-1981), Michael Holm ("Leb Wohl", 1980), Amii Stewart ("Busy Busy Man" and "Rocky Woman", 1981) and La Compagnie Créole ("Love Is Good For You", 1983).

== Songs for Belgian artists ==
- "Draai 797204", "De Zigeuner", "Mijn Winterroosje", "Als de Zomer Weer Voorbij Zal Zijn", "El Bandido", "Heimwee Naar Huis", "Arme Joe", "Viva El Amor", "M'n Airhostess", "Hopeloos", "Vergeet Barbara", "De Noorderwind", "Twee Verliefde Ogen" en andere (Will Tura, 1964)
- "On Ne Peut Pas Vivre Sans Amour", "On ne peut pas toujours faire plaisir au bon Dieu", "Monica (Piccola)", "Ma Richesse", "Si Jamais", "Reviens Dans Mes Bras", "Si Jamais", "Esperanza", "Les Diables rouges vont en Espagne", "Le Pantin" (Robert Cogoi)
- "De Maan Houdt de Wacht" (Tony Sandler, 1957)
- "Addio" (Tony Sandler, 1957)
- "All right Mamma", "Just Because (You Know)" (The Cousins, 1965)
- "Four sailors back home" en "You will find an other baby" (The Cousins, 1966)
- "Geen Wonder Dat Ik Ween" (Paul Severs, 1966)
- "Zo Mooi, Zo Blond en Zo Alleen" (Jimmy Frey, 1968)
- "Rode Rozen in de Sneeuw" (Marva, 1975)
- "Waarom Schrijft Hij Niet" (Ann Christy, 1974)
- "Rocking Horse", "Oh Mon Amour", "Bla Bla Bla", "Een Schommelpaard Zonder Staart", "Ik Mis Hem Zo" (Ann Christy, 1975)
- "Stille Schreden", "Slaap Er Eens Over", "Er Is Zoveel Verdriet in de Wereld", "Lisa Is Lisa" (Ann Christy, 1976)
- "Adios" (Dana Winner, 1991)
- "Ballalaïka's" (Dana Winner, 1993)
- "Alleen op de Wereld" (Willy Sommers, 1992)
- "Blauw is de Nacht" (Christoff, 2008)

== Songs for foreign artists ==
- "Sweetheart, my darling", "mijn schat" (Caterina Valente, 1959)
- "Raak Me Niet Aan" (Conny Vandenbos, 1963)
- "C'est Pour Toi" (Ariane, 1966)
- Help (Get me some help) (Tony Ronald, 1971)
- "Help" (Nina & Mike, 1973)
- "Michaela" (Alain Braine, 1973; Gérard Michel, 1973)
- "Do You Speak French" (Night School, 1977)
- "Mon Grand Amour C'est John Travolta" (Sandy, 1979)
- "In Love Again", "All I Ever Want Is You", "Because I Love You", "Limbo", "Mariana", "Quartier Latin", que sera mi vida, "Rio Brasilia", "Sheela", "Such a Funky Way" (The Gibson Brothers (1979-1983))
- "Michèle", "Sans Toi" (Jeremy)
- "Busy Busy Man", "Rocky Woman" (Amii Stewart, 1981)
- "Love Is Good For You" (La Compagnie Créole, 1983)
- "Gloria" (Lolita, 1980)
- "Leb Wohl" (Michael Holm, 1980)
- "Let Me Love You Tonight" (Vicky Edimo, 1980)
- "Le Bateau Blanc" (Sasha Distel, 1980)
- "A.I.E. Is My Song", "Crazy Music", "Doudou la Rumba", "Hands Up", "Help!Get Me Some Help", "It's a Top Secret", "Shalala Song", "Siesta For Two", "Sing Along With The Juke-Box" (Ottawan, 1980-1981)
- "Une Affair d'Amour" (Sheila, 1981)
- "Hands Up "(The Modern Accordeon Selection, 1981)
- "Les Loups Jaloux" (Box Office, 1982)
- "Tu Me Pompe L'Air (Charlotte Julian, 1986)
