= Will Tura =

Belgian singer, musician, and composer (born 1940)

Knight Will Tura
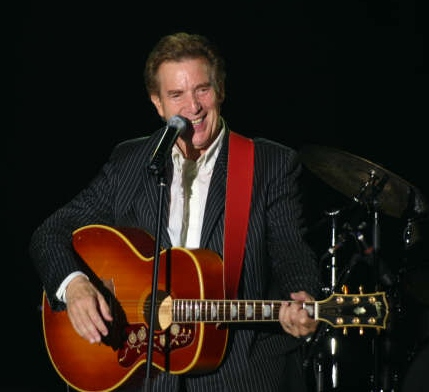
- Tura performing in 2005

Background information
- Born: Arthur Achiel Albert Blanckaert; 2 August 1940 (age 86); Veurne, Belgium
- Genres: Levenslied, pop rock, rock and roll, soul, gospel, country, schlager
- Occupations: Singer, instrumentalist, composer, songwriter
- Instruments: Piano, guitar, accordion, harmonica, drums
- Years active: 1963–2023
- Website: willtura.be

Arthur Achiel Albert, Knight Blanckaert (born 2 August 1940 in Veurne), known by his stage name Will Tura, is a Belgian artist considered as the most successful Flemish-speaking singer of the 20th century. Famous in Flanders and the Netherlands, Tura is a singer, musician (he plays the piano, guitar, drums, accordion and harmonica), composer and songwriter. Nicknamed the Emperor of the Flemish Song, he released hundreds of singles and albums that cover a wide array of styles, and continued to tour into the 2010s.

== Career ==
Will Tura started singing when he was only nine years old, covering Gilbert Bécaud and Nat King Cole. Tura's first producer was Jacques Kluger, and later his son Jean Kluger.

Tura's first hit was Eenzaam zonder jou (Eng, Lonely without you) in 1963, for which he wrote the melody, and Ke Riema the text.

The first collaboration with Nelly Byl resulted in the song (Draai dan) 797204 (Eng: Then dial 797204) a cover of Hawkshaw Hawkins' Lonesome 7-7203. It became an instant hit, but it also caused a fuss. Since the telephone number 797204 turned out to really exist in the Netherlands, the song was banned there on the radio.

The cooperation with Byl will become exceptional. For many successful songs, she wrote the lyrics, after Tura composed the music earlier.

Many hits followed in various musical styles, including rock 'n roll, gospel, country and rap (Moa vent toch, released in 1992, in the West Flemish dialect).

During the sixties and seventies, Will Tura was by far the most popular Dutch-speaking artist in Flanders. In 1974, he was the first Belgian artist to sell out Vorst National in Brussels.

In 1984 he made a tribute album to Elvis Presley in Nashville, together with Elvis' band. In 1992 he also released his first Tura in Symfonie, performing with a symphonic orchestra.

In 1987 Will recorded the album Ouvertura, together with the London Symphony Orchestra and Robert Groslot.

Tura had a car accident in 1988, and the song Mooi, 't leven is mooi (Eng: Beautiful, life is beautiful) about it became a megahit in Flanders, and it became the most frequently played song of 1989 according to SABAM, with Clouseau's Anne in second place.

In 1990, various alternative rock artists from Flanders created Turalura, a tribute album for the artist. It turned out to be the breakthrough of the alternative band Noordkaap, who covered his 1967 song Arme Joe (Eng: Poor Joe), about a race driver that dies in his last race.

In 2005, Tura's 65th birthday was celebrated elaborately in the Flemish media, along with the release of the cd Viva Tura.

Tura sang Ik mis je zo (Eng: I miss you so) and Hoop doet leven (Eng: Hope gives life) at the ceremony for the deceased King Baudouin of Belgium in 1993. In 2014 he reprised "Hoop doet leven" at the funeral of Queen Fabiola. At the engagement party of Prince Philippe and Princess Mathilde in 1999 he gave a mini-recital.

In 1995 Will was made cultural ambassador of Flanders. Tura sold out Vorst Nationaal for three concerts in 1998. 2 years later, he was the central artist at Nekka-Nacht. His songs were performed by artists like Toots Thielemans, Noordkaap and Johan Verminnen, and the concert was released as an album Will Tura & Vrienden-Nekka Nacht 2000.

In 2002 one of Tura's dreams came true, recording an album at the Abbey Road Studios entitled De Mooiste Droom (Eng: the most beautiful dream) with the London Philharmonic Orchestra.

A second tribute to Tura, Turalura 2, was released in 2010. On the album, artist like Arid, Triggerfinger, Arno and k's Choice all sang in Dutch, which was unusual for them.

After a performance at the main square of Veurne on the occasion of his 75th birthday, Tura decided to reduce the number of concerts. He worked as co-composer for the Studio 100 musical '40-'45, of which the soundtrack became a certified golden album.

A documentary film of Will Tura, Hoop Doet Leven, directed by Dominique Deruddere was released in the Flemish movie theatres in 2018. A Studio 100 musical, Vergeet Barbara, celebrating the songs of Tura was premiered in 2022.

A year later, after a 60-year long career, Will Tura decided to completely quit performing. Shortly after that, it was revealed that he has Alzheimer's disease. His very last album, a 5 CD collection of 100 singles, was released end July 2023.

== Personal life ==
Will Tura is married to Jenny Swinnen, with whom he has a son David (born 16 October 1974) and a daughter Sandy (born 21 November 1975). His daughter married Flemish TV presenter Luc Alloo in 2011.

== Awards and honours ==
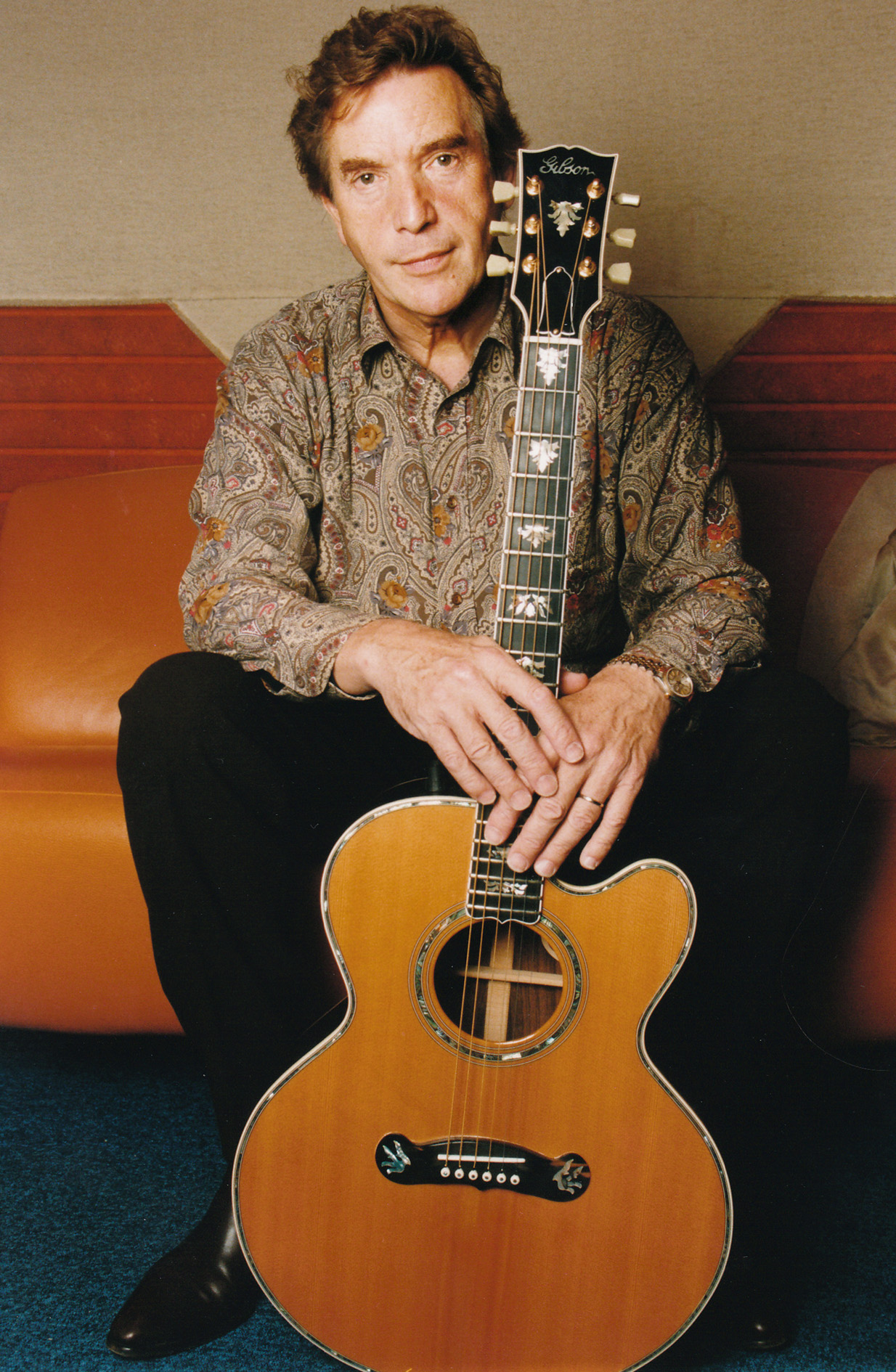
Tura in 2010

Tura was appointed an Officer of the Belgian Order of the Crown in 1999. In 2001, he was raised into the Belgian nobility by King Albert II and given for life the Belgian noble title Ridder, translated into English as "Knight".

- Humo's Pop Poll - Best Singer National: 1967->1974
- Midem trophy of best selling Belgian artist: 1968
- Honorary citizen of Veurne: 1971
- Radio 2 Hit of the summer: 1973 (Verboden dromen) and 1975 (Zomerliefje)
- Honorary citizen of Kampenhout: 1975
- Dag Hammarskjöld prize: 1979
- VRT Gouden Oog - Best Singer: 1992, 1993, 1994
- Appointment as Cultural Ambassador of Flanders: 1995
- ZAMU career achievement award: 1996
- Officer in the Order of the Crown: 1999
- Central artist at Nekka-Nacht: 2000
- Radio 2 Hall of Fame: 2000 (song Eenzaam zonder jou), 2003 (career prize), 2014 (song Ik mis je zo)
- Created Knight Will Tura by Royal Decree: 2001
- Golden medal of honor of the Flemish Parliament: 2007
- Music Industry Award: 2010 (best popular artist), 2015 (career award)
- SABAM Lifetime achievement award: 2014
- Ketje award of Brussels: 2016
- Flemish Golden Spur award: 2019
- Statue in Veurne: 2020
- Will Tura Sportpark in Veurne: 2021
- Belpop Tura Special, a theatre tour about his career and songs: 2021-22
- Decoration of the Flemish Community: 2022

== Trivia ==
- Tura has a cameo in the Suske en Wiske album De Krimson Crisis, where he is one of the famous Belgians fighting Krimson.
- Veurne has only three honorary citizens: Will Tura, Paul Delvaux and King Albert I of Belgium.
- After his car accident in 1988, the prognosis was that he could never jog again with his broken kneecap. However, in 2006 he still ran 5 to 8 kilometers daily.
- In a newspaper survey, his debut song Eenzaam zonder jou got elected the biggest hit in Flanders ever, and it has a place in the Eregallerij (a hall of fame of the Flemish song, an initiative of Belgian copyright collective SABAM and radio station Radio 2) since the first edition in 2000.

== Discography ==
Will Tura has a total of 130 album releases.

=== 1960s ===
- Will Tura (1963)
- Will Tura nr 01 – Eerste Hits (1964)
- Will Tura (1964)
- Will Tura nr 02 (1965)
- Tura Hits (1965)
- At the piano – Will Tura plays Will Tura (1966)
- Uit het hart (1966)
- Will Tura nr 03 (1966)
- Will Tura nr 04 (1967)
- Tura story (1968)
- Will Tura nr 05 (1968)
- Will Tura nr 06 – Viva el amor (1968)
- Will Tura's eerste hits (1969)
- Will Tura nr 07 (1969)

=== 1970s ===
- Will Tura nr 08 – Linda (1970)
- Will Tura nr 09 (1971)
- Will Tura nr 10 (1972)
- Witte Kerstmis (1973)
- Will Tura nr 11 (1973)
- This is Will Tura (1973)
- Portrait of Will Tura (1973)
- Will Tura nr 12 (1974)
- De wereldreis van kleine Jan (1974)
- Liefdeverdriet (1970)
- Will Tura : his life, his music (1975)
- Will Tura nr 13 (1975)
- Avond met Will Tura (1975)
- Lach ermee (1975)
- Will Tura Live (1976)
- Will Tura nr 14 (1976)
- Will Tura (1976)
- Will Tura in Nashville (1976)
- Kalender (1976)
- International (1976)
- Gouden plaat van Will Tura (1976)
- Will Tura (quality sound series) (1977)
- Will Tura nr 15 (1977)
- Vlaanderen mijn land (1977)
- 20 jaar : 1957–1977 (1977)
- Will Tura nr 16 (1978)
- Will Tura (quality sound series) (1978)
- Hello moeders (1978)
- Vrolijk Kerstfeest, Gelukkig Nieuwjaar (1978)
- Liefdesliedjes Will Tura & Marva (1979)
- Stepping out (1979)
- The golden best of Will Tura (1979)
- Non stop dansen en zingen met Will Tura (1979)
- Will Tura (picturedisc) (1979)
- Hits a gogo (1979)
- In mijn caravan (1979)

=== 1980s ===
- I love you (1980)
- Favoriete album vol 1 (1980)
- Laatste cowboy (1980)
- Mijn eerste successen (case with 3 lp's) (1980)
- Mijn eerste successen vol 2 (case with 3 lp's) (1980)
- Liedjes die ik graag gezongen had (1955–1960) (1980)
- Liefdeverdriet (1980)
- Tura 81 (1981)
- Liedjes die ik graag gezongen had (1960–1965) (1981)
- Favorieten album vol 2 (1981)
- Toppers van Tura 1 (1982)
- Toppers van Tura 2 (1982)
- 25 jaar Tura – 22 allergrootste successen (1982)
- Liefdeverdriet vol 1 (1982)
- Tura 82 (1982)
- Mijn grootste successen (1983)
- Tura 83 (1983)
- Seventies collectie (1984)
- Will Tura 1957–1964 (1984)
- Will Tura zingt Elvis Presley (1984)
- Tura 84 (1984)
- Waar een Will is,… (1985)
- Tura 85 – in concert (1985)
- Tura 87 (1986)
- Will Tura Hitrevue (1986)
- 12 Tura toppers (1986)
- Ik zing alleen voor jou (1987)
- Een uur met Tura (1987)
- Ouvertura – Robert Groslot (1987)
- Tura 2000 (1988)
- Vlaanderen (1988)
- De sixties collectie (1989)
- De seventies collectie (1989)
- Tura vandaag (1989)

=== 1990s ===
- 16 voor Tura (1990)
- Live concert Veurne (1990)
- Turalura, rockers zingen Tura (1990)
- 1991 – karaoke jij zingt de hits van Tura (1991)
- Mijn allereerste successen (1991)
- Nieuwe wegen (1991)
- Rock 'n roll in mijn hart (1991)
- Tura in symfonie I (1992)
- Moa ven toch (1992)
- Hoop doet leven (1993)
- Grootste hits 1973–1993 (1993)
- Vrolijkste liedjes 1973–1993 (1994)
- 20 jaar tura (3 cd's) (1994)
- Tura in symfonie II (1994)
- Herinneringen 1973–1993 (1994)
- Double gold (2 cd's) (1994)
- Bloed, zweet & tranen (1995)
- Tura in studio (1995)
- Tura in symfonie III (1996)
- Europa (1996)
- Tura in harmonie (concertband voor Vlaanderen) (1997)
- Puur Tura (1997)
- 40 jaar – 60s–70s–80s–90s (1997)
- Tura in Vorst (2 cd's) (1998)
- Alleen gaan & de mooiste slows '87–'97 (1998)
- Tura gospel & kerst (1999)

=== 2000s ===
- Tura gospel (2000)
- ECI Premium (ware liefde) (2000)
- Ware liefde (2000)
- Tura collectie 1 (2001)
- Tura collectie 2 (2001)
- Tura collectie 3 (2001)
- Tura collectie 4 (2001)
- Tura collectie 5 (2001)
- Tura collectie 6 (2001)
- Terugblik 1 (2001)
- Terugblik 2 (2001)
- Terugblik 3 (2001)
- Terugblik 4 (2001)
- Terugblik 5 (2001)
- Terugblik 6 (2001)
- Het beste van Will Tura (2 cd's, 2001)
- De mooiste droom (2002)
- Gospel live! CD & DVD (2002)
- Onvergetelijk / Unforgettable (2009)
- Ik Ben een Zanger (2012)
- Klein Geluk (2016)
- Hoop Doet Leven (2018)
- Tura 80 (2020)
- Als Ik Terugkijk (En 99 Andere Liedjes) (2023)
