= The Secret Life of Bots =

2017 science fiction story by Suzanne Palmer

"The Secret Life of Bots" is a 2017 science fiction story by the American author Suzanne Palmer. It was first published in Clarkesworld Magazine.

== Synopsis ==
Autonomous maintenance robots take on a much larger role in saving a spaceship from aliens than the ship's human crew could have ever suspected.

== Reception ==
"The Secret Life of Bots" won the 2018 Hugo Award for Best Novelette and the WSFA Small Press Award. Tangent Online considered it to be "charming", with "vivid, interesting characters", and noted the robots have "individuality and multitudes of personalities".

Year	Award	Category	Result	Ref
2018	Hugo Award	Novelette	Won	
2018	Locus Award	Novelette	Nominated	
2018	Theodore Sturgeon Award	—	Finalist	
2018	WSFA Small Press Award	—	Won	
