= D.I.S.C.O. =

1979 single by Ottawan

Single by Ottawan

from the album D.I.S.C.O.
- Released: 1979
- Genre: Disco
- Length: 4:56
- Label: Carrere
- Songwriters: Daniel Vangarde; Jean Kluger
- Producer: Daniel Vangarde

Ottawan singles chronology
"D.I.S.C.O." (1979)	"You're OK" (1980)

"D.I.S.C.O." is a song by the French band Ottawan, written by Daniel Vangarde and Jean Kluger and produced by Daniel Vangarde. Ottawan originally recorded it in French. It was first released in 1979 and reached number two in the UK Singles Chart the following year. The song's name is an acronym and comes from the lyrics in its chorus, in which a woman is described as "D.I.S.C.O.". In other words, each letter of the word standing for a certain quality, except "O", which simply leads to singing "oh-oh-oh" ("She is D, delirious / She is I, incredible / She is S, superficial / She is C, complicated / She is oh-oh-oh"). While the woman gives positive attributes to herself, the man contrasts that with negative attributes. The song was played at 2024 Paris Olympics opening ceremony.

== Charts and certifications ==
=== Weekly charts ===
Chart (1979–1980)	Peak position
Austria (Ö3 Austria Top 40)	4
Belgium (Ultratop 50 Flanders)	2
France (IFOP)	7
Ireland (IRMA)	2
Netherlands (Dutch Top 40)	3
Netherlands (Single Top 100)	1
Norway (VG-lista)	1
South Africa (Springbok Radio)	5
Switzerland (Schweizer Hitparade)	5
UK Singles (Official Charts)	2
West Germany (GfK)	2

=== Year-end charts ===
Chart (1980)	Rank
Austria (Ö3 Austria Top 40)	13
Belgium (Ultratop 50 Flanders)	18
Netherlands (Dutch Top 40)	22
Netherlands (Single Top 100)	26
UK Singles (OCC)	5
West Germany (Official German Charts)	3

=== Certifications and sales ===
Region	Certification	Certified units/sales
France (SNEP)	Gold	500,000^{*}
United Kingdom (BPI)	Gold	706,000
^{*} Sales figures based on certification alone.

== N-Trance version ==
"D.I.S.C.O."

Single by N-Trance

from the album Happy Hour
- B-side: "So High"
- Released: 24 March 1997
- Studio: The Cheese Factory (Manchester, England)
- Length: 4:20
- Label: All Around the World
- Songwriters: Jean Kluger; Daniel Vangarde; Kevin O'Toole; Dale Longworth; Ricardo Lyte
- Producers: Curds and Whey

N-Trance singles chronology
"Electronic Pleasure" (1996)	"D.I.S.C.O." (1997)	"Da Ya Think I'm Sexy?" (1997)

Music video
- "D.I.S.C.O." on YouTube

British electronic music group N-Trance released a single based on the original hit with added rap lyrics not found in the original, written by Kevin O'Toole, Dale Longworth, and Ricardo da Force. The cover was released in March 1997 as the first single from their second album, Happy Hour (1997), and reached number 11 on the UK Singles Chart.

=== Critical reception ===
Alan Jones from Music Week commented, "Once again Ricardo da Force's new and original raps replace most of the verses, while the rest of the group slot in around him. The song adapts rather less well than 'Stayin' Alive' but will surely give them another hit."

=== Track listings ===
- UK 12-inch single

A1. "D.I.S.C.O" (extended version)
A2. "D.I.S.C.O" (radio edit)
B1. "D.I.S.C.O" (San Frandisco mix)
B2. "So High"

- UK and Australian CD single
1. "D.I.S.C.O" (radio edit)
2. "D.I.S.C.O" (San Frandisco mix)
3. "So High"
4. "D.I.S.C.O" (extended version)
- UK cassette single
1. "D.I.S.C.O" (radio edit)
2. "So High"

=== Credits and personnel ===
Credits are lifted from the UK CD single liner notes.

Studios

- Recorded at the Cheese Factory (Manchester, England)
- Mixed at PWL Studios (London, England)

Personnel

- Jean Kluger – writing
- Daniel Vangarde – writing
- Kevin O'Toole – writing, synths
- Dale Longworth – writing, programming
- Ricardo da Force – writing (as Ricardo Lyte)
- Jerome Stokes – vocals
- Viveen Wray – vocals
- Vinny Burns – guitars
- Curds and Whey – production
- Nobby – engineering

=== Charts ===
Chart (1997)	Peak position
Australia (ARIA)	82
Austria (Ö3 Austria Top 40)	29
Europe (Eurochart Hot 100)	37
Finland (Suomen virallinen lista)	10
Ireland (IRMA)	10
Israel (Israeli Singles Chart)	27
Netherlands (Dutch Top 40 Tipparade)	10
Netherlands (Single Top 100)	82
Scottish Singles Sales (Official Charts)	8
UK Singles (Official Charts)	11
UK Dance (Official Charts)	22

== Chico Slimani version ==
"D.I.S.C.O."

Single by Chico
- Released: 2006
- Songwriters: Daniel Vangarde; Jean Kluger

Chico singles chronology
"It's Chico Time" (2006)	"D.I.S.C.O." (2006)	"Curvy Cola Bottle Body Baby" (2007)

In 2006, The X Factor former contestant Chico Slimani released an alternative version as a follow-up to his number 1 hit "It's Chico Time". His version of D.I.S.C.O. reached number 24 on the UK Singles Chart.

Lyrics
He amended lyrics to say "C.H.I.C.O. on D.I.S.C.O." and amended lyrics to:

- D dynamic
- I incredible
- S supersonic
- C Chicolicious (alluding to his own name)
- "O oh, oh, oh".

=== Charts ===
Chart (2006)	Peak position
UK Singles (Official Charts)	24

== TYP version ==
"D.I.S.C.O. (TYP D.I.S.C.O.)"

Single by TYP

from the album 9am to 5pm, 5pm to Whenever
- Released: 2011
- Length: 3:25
- Label: Universal Music
- Songwriters: Daniel Vangarde; Jean Kluger; Ivri Lider; Yonatan Goldstein

Music video
- "D.I.S.C.O." on YouTube

In 2011, the song was sampled by Israeli musical duo TYP (also known as The Young Professionals) for their track "D.I.S.C.O." from their album 9am to 5pm, 5pm to Whenever. The music video features Uriel Yekutiel, an Israeli gay icon.

=== Charts ===
Chart (2012)	Peak position
France (SNEP)	53

== See also ==
- List of number-one songs in Norway
