= Suzanne Palmer =

American science fiction author

- Other name: zanzjan
- Occupation: Writer
- Website: zanzjan.net

Suzanne Palmer is an American science fiction writer known for her novelette "The Secret Life of Bots", which won a Hugo Award for Best Novelette in 2018. The story also won a WSFA Small Press Award and was a finalist for the Theodore Sturgeon Award.

== Career ==
Palmer has a Bachelor of Fine Arts degree from the University of Massachusetts Amherst. She was the head librarian of the UMass Science Fiction Society. She lives in Massachusetts, where she works as a system administrator at Smith College.

She has been publishing short fiction and poetry since 2005. She cites John Scalzi, Elizabeth Bear, Karl Schroeder, and Martha Wells as some of her influences and describes her primary genre as "space opera-style science fiction". She moderates the SFF room on the AbsoluteWrite forums using her online name zanzjan.

Her first full-length novel, Finder, a thriller about an interstellar repo man, was published by DAW Books in 2019. She has since published three more novels in that series: Driving the Deep, The Scavenger Door, and Ghostdrift.

In 2020, Palmer won the Theodore Sturgeon Award for her story "Waterlines".

== Awards ==
Year	Title	Award	Category	Result	Ref
2017	"Ten Poems for the Mossums, One for the Man"	Eugie Award	—	Finalist	
2018	"The Secret Life of Bots"	Hugo Award	Novelette	Won	
2018	"The Secret Life of Bots"	Locus Award	Novelette	Nominated	
2018	"The Secret Life of Bots"	Theodore Sturgeon Award	—	Finalist	
2018	"The Secret Life of Bots"	WSFA Small Press Award	—	Won	
2020	Finder	Locus Award	First Novel	Nominated	
2020	"Waterlines"	Locus Award	Novella	Nominated	
2020	"Waterlines"	Theodore Sturgeon Award	—	Won	
2020	"The Painter of Trees"	Theodore Sturgeon Award	—	Finalist	
2020	"The Painter of Trees"	WSFA Small Press Award	—	Nominated	
2021	Driving the Deep	Locus Award	Sci-fi Novel	Nominated	
2022	"Bots of the Lost Ark"	Hugo Award	Novelette	Won	
2022	"Bots of the Lost Ark"	Locus Award	Novelette	Nominated	
2022	"Bots of the Lost Ark"	Theodore Sturgeon Award	—	Finalist	
2023	"Falling Off the Edge of the World"	Locus Award	Novelette	Nominated	
2023	"The Sadness Box"	Locus Award	Novelette	Nominated	

== Bibliography ==
=== Novels ===
Finder Chronicles

- Palmer, Suzanne (2019). Finder (hardcover 1st ed.). DAW Books. ISBN 9780756415105.
- —— (2020). Driving the Deep (hardcover 1st ed.). DAW Books. ISBN 9780756415068.
- —— (2021). The Scavenger Door (hardcover 1st ed.). DAW Books. ISBN 9780756415150.
- —— (2024). Ghostdrift (hardcover 1st ed.). DAW Books. ISBN 9780756418878.
- —— (2026). Ode to the Half-Broken (hardcover 1st ed.). DAW Books (published May 26, 2026). ISBN 9780756419585.

=== Short fiction ===
Note: (Note: Short stories, unless otherwise noted.)

Year	Title	First published	Reprinted/collected	Notes
2015	"Tuesdays"	Palmer, Suzanne (March 2015). "Tuesdays". Asimov's Science Fiction. 39 (3): 21–24.		The first page was omitted due to publisher's error; it was instead printed as p.9 in the April/May 2015 issue.

- "The Ins and Outs of Intergalactic Diplomacy" (2005) (published in Andromeda Spaceways Inflight Magazine #20)
- "He's Got Skeleteons" (2006) (published in Aoife's Kiss webzine)
- "Spheres" (2006) (published in Interzone #207)
- "The Neighborly Thing" (2007) (published in Andromeda Spaceways Inflight Magazine #31)
- "Concession Girl" (2008) (published in Interzone #217)
- "Silence and Roses" (2009) (published in Interzone #223)
- "Zombie Cabana Boy" (2010) (published in Black Static #17)
- "The Ceiling Is Sky" (2011) (published in Interzone #234)
- "By the Time I Get to Phoenix" (2011) (published in Comets and Criminals #1)
- "Surf" (2011) (published in Asimov's Science Fiction)
- "Two for the Starry Night" (2012) (published in Comets and Criminals #2)
- "Adware" (2012) (published in Asimov's Science Fiction)
- "Tangerine, Nectarine, Clementine, Apocalypse" (2012) (published in Interzone #239)
- "Hotel" (2013) (published in Asimov's Science Fiction)
- "Fly Away Home" (2014) (published in Interzone #251)
- "House Party Blues" (2014) (published in Black Static #39)
- "Shatterdown" (2014) (published in Asimov's Science Fiction)
- "Moogh and the Great Trench Kraken" (2015) (published in Beneath Ceaseless Skies #181)
- "Lazy Dog Out" (2016) (published in Asimov's Science Fiction)
- "Ten Poems for the Mossums, One for the Man" (2016) (published in Asimov's Science Fiction)
- "Detroit Hammersmith, Zero Gravity Toilet Repairman (Retired)" (2016) (published in Analog Science Fiction and Fact)
- "Belong" (2016) (published in Interzone #265)
- "Number Thirty-Nine Skink" (2017) (published in Asimov's Science Fiction)
- "Books of the Risen Sea" (2017) (published in Asimov's Science Fiction)
- "The Secret Life of Bots" (2017) (published in Clarkesworld Magazine #132)
- "The Streaming Man" (2018) (published in Analog Science Fiction and Fact)
- "Stones in the Water, Cottage on the Mountain" (2018) (published in Asimov's Science Fiction)
- "R.U.R-8?" (2018) (published in Asimov's Science Fiction)
- "Thirty-Three Percent Joe" (2018) (published in Clarkesworld Magazine #145)
- "Taking Icarus Home" (2019) (published in Asimov's Science Fiction)
- "The Painter of Trees" (2019) (published in Clarkesworld Magazine #153)
- "Waterlines" (2019) (published in Asimov's Science Fiction)
- "Dave's Head" (2019) (published in Clarkesworld Magazine #156)
- "Table Etiquette for Diplomatic Personnel, in Seventeen Scenes" (2021) (published in Asimov's Science Fiction)
- "Bots of the Lost Ark" (2021) (published in Clarkesworld Magazine #177)

———————
