= The Young Professionals =

Israeli electro pop band

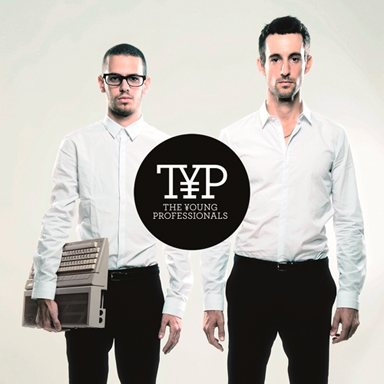

Background information
- Origin: Tel Aviv, Israel
- Genres: Pop, electronic music
- Years active: 2009–2015
- Labels: Polydor and Casablanca (of Universal Music Group)
- Members: Ivri Lider; Johnny Goldstein
- Website: www.typband.com

The Young Professionals (also known as TYP or T¥P) is an Israeli electro pop band made up of producer Johnny Goldstein (in Hebrew: יונתן "ג'וני" גולדשטיין, born January 29, 1991) and singer/songwriter/producer Ivri Lider (Hebrew: עברי לידר, born February 10, 1974). The band mixes electronic sounds, guitars and acoustic percussion to create music described as alternative pop.

In 2012, the duo released their debut album internationally as 9am to 5pm, 5pm to Whenever (originally an Israeli 2011 release titled 09:00 to 17:00, 17:00 to Whenever). "TYP D.I.S.C.O.", a remake of the hit by Ottawan, was their first international hit single.

== History ==
Ivri Lider was an established Israeli solo artist who was named Israeli Artist of the Year in 2005. He has released six solo albums, all of which have gone gold or platinum, and composed music for the films Yossi & Jagger, Walk on Water and The Bubble. Johnny "Yonatan" Goldstein is a music producer who has worked with Hadag Nahash, Avishai Cohen and Dana Adini of Habanot Nechama.

In 2008, Goldstein asked Lider to contribute to his hip hop album The Johnny Show, but Lider was unavailable. A year later, the two met and began collaborating – Goldstein would send Lider an electronic track, and Lider would send back lyrics and melodies. The duo came up with The Young Professionals concept, recording music in the guise of fashionable yuppie characters who work during the day and spend their evenings dancing at clubs. To enhance the music’s playful commentary on modern life, they recruited fashion, design, art, video and social networking specialists to join the band.

TYP, accompanied by drummer Tal Tamari, has made a point of performing at events suited to their multi-disciplinary aesthetic. In 2011, they put on their debut performance at the Fresh Paint Contemporary Art Fair in Tel Aviv; created a video-mapping spectacle that correlated with the building’s architecture at the opening event for the Tel Aviv Museum of Art’s new Herta and Paul Amir Building; and played the Castro Fall 2011 Fashion Show. In 2012, they performed on the central stage at the 2012 Tel Aviv Gay Pride Parade, and on the French television show Le Grand Journal, broadcast live from the Cannes International Film Festival.

TYP’s debut effort, 09:00 to 17:00, 17:00 to Whenever, was released in Israel in 2011. Each song on the album represents a different hour of the day, from working at the office during business hours to partying at the club at night. The record’s first single, “D.I.S.C.O.,” is a remake of Ottawan’s 1979 song of the same name. The video (directed by Guy Sagy) features an elaborate dance led by Israeli dancer Uriel Yekutiel, a frequent collaborator. The follow-up single, “20 Seconds,” was described as a “hypnotizing mashup of cool western electro and middle eastern heat.”

In January 2012, TYP signed a three-record deal with Polydor Records, a subsidiary of Universal Music Group. 09:00 to 17:00, 17:00 to Whenever was released in France in June 2012 and North America in July 2012, with the amended title 9am to 5pm, 5pm to Whenever in line with the 12-hour clock. The 2012 release consists of a slightly different track listing from its precursor, including a cover version of Lana Del Rey's 2011 single "Video Games".

In March 2012, TYP signed with American events promoter Live Nation Entertainment.

== Awards ==
At the 2011 MTV EMA Awards, TYP was named Best Israeli Act. The band was also nominated in the Worldwide category for Best European Act.

== Discography ==
=== Albums ===
Year	Album	Charts	Certification	Notes
Year	Album	FR	Certification	Notes
2011 / 2012	9am to 5pm, 5pm to Whenever	114		(Original title, Israel 2011): 09:00 to 17:00, 17:00 to Whenever / (International release title (2012): 9am to 5pm, 5pm to Whenever
2015	Quick, Quick, Star, Star, Money, Money			

=== Extended plays ===
- 2012: EP
- 2012: TYP Disco (The Remixes), Pt. 1 - EP
- 2012:TYP Disco (The Remixes), Pt. 2 - EP
- 2014: Let's Do It Right (The Remixes), Pt. 1 - EP
- 2014: Let's Do It Right (The Remixes), Pt. 2 - EP
- 2014: Think Again - EP

=== Singles ===
- 2011: "D.I.S.C.O."
- 2011: "20 Seconds"
- 2012: "Be With You Tonight"
- 2014: "Let's Do It Right" feat. Eva Simons
- 2015: "All Of It But Me" feat. Anna F.

=== Remixes ===
Year	Artist	Track	Label
2012	The Young Professionals	"Be With You Tonight "	Polydor
2012	Mylène Farmer	"A l'ombre"	Polydor
2012	The Echo Friendly	"Same Mistakes"	
2014	Tegan and Sara	"Closer"	Warner Music Group
2014	The Young Professionals	"Let's Do It Right"	Polydor
2014	Skip the Use	"Nameless World"	Polydor
2014	Zedd	"Find You feat. Matthew Koma and Miriam Bryant"	Interscope
2014	Emmanuelle Seigner	"You Think You're a Man"	Polydor
2014	Moby feat. Damien Jurado	"Almost Home"	Little Idiot
2014	Lana Del Rey	"West Coast"	Interscope
2014	Guéna LG & Amir Afargan feat. Sophie Ellis-Bextor	"Back 2 Paradise"	La 5ème Communication
2014	Julian Perretta	"Wildfire"	Polydor
2014	Mutine	"OÙ SONT LES HOMMES"	Polydor
