= Gibson Brothers =

France-based musical group

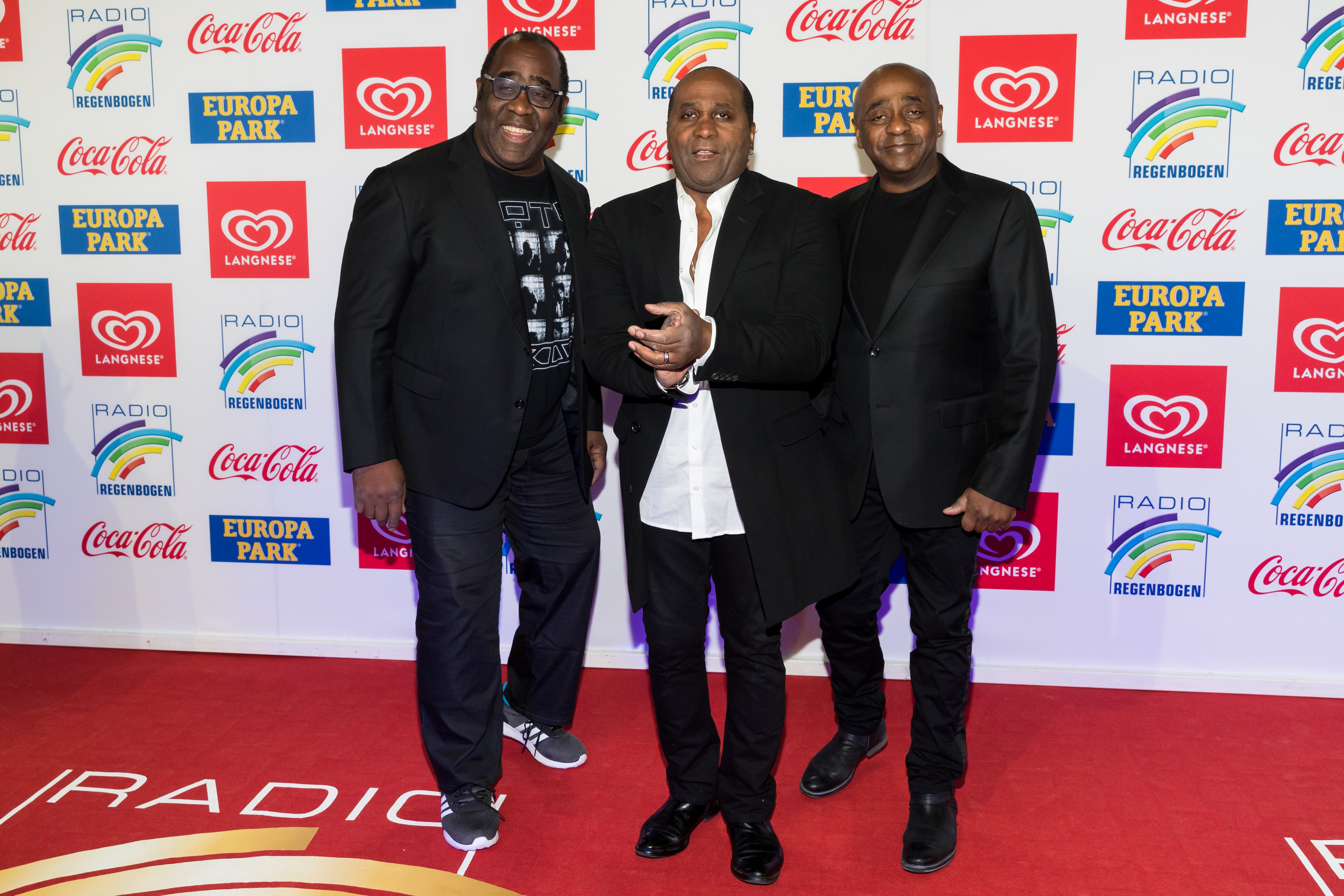
- Gibson Brothers (2018)

Background information
- Origin: Martinique, France
- Genre: Disco
- Years active: 1976–present
- Members: Alex Francfort; Chris Francfort
- Past members: Patrick Francfort
- Website: Official website

The Gibson Brothers are a French musical group, originally from Martinique, who had their greatest success during the disco boom of the late 1970s. Their best known hit singles included "Non-stop dance" (first half 1977), "Cuba" (first half 1979) and "Que Sera Mi Vida" (end 1979 - first half 1980).

== Career ==
The three brothers, Chris Francfort (born 20 June 1954, lead vocals, percussion), Patrick Francfort (23 February 1957 – 4 April 2020, vocals, drums) and Alex Francfort (vocals, keyboards), were born in Lamentin Acajou on Martinique. They traveled with their parents to Paris in the mid-1950s, and in 1969 joined the group Phalansters, formed by Jean-Jacques Goldman. They also formed the group Martinique Express, who appeared on French television alongside Guy Lux. They were seen by record producer Daniel Vangarde, who changed the name of their group to Gibson Brothers.

They recorded their first single "Come to America" in Paris in 1976, and both it and its follow-up "Non Stop Dance" made the charts in Europe, where they toured successfully. The following year they released "Heaven", which was picked up by TK Records in the U.S.

In 1978, they recorded "Cuba". In the UK it made No. 41 on its initial release, and No. 12 when reissued in 1980. Like most of their other hits, it was written and produced by Vangarde, and the Belgian producer Jean Kluger. The Gibson Brothers had three further big hits in 1979 and 1980 with "Ooh! What a Life", ”Mariana” and "Que Sera Mi Vida".

Patrick Francfort, known as Patrick Gibson, died on April 4, 2020, from COVID-19.

== Discography ==
=== Albums ===
| Year | Album | UK |
|---|---|---|
| 1977 | By Night | — |
| 1977 | Non-Stop Dance/Come to America | — |
| 1978 | Heaven | — |
| 1979 | Cuba | — |
| 1980 | On the Riviera | 50 |
| 1981 | Quartier Latin | — |
| 1984 | Emily | — |
| 1996 | Move On Up | — |
| 2005 | Blue Island | — |
"—" denotes releases that did not chart.

=== Singles ===
| Date | Title | Charts | | | | | | | | | | Album |
| Date | Title | FRA | GER | AUS | BEL | FIN | ITA | HOL | UK | US Hot 100 | US US Dance | Album |
|---|---|---|---|---|---|---|---|---|---|---|---|---|
| 1976 | "Come to America" | 35 | — | — | 12 | — | 12 | — | — | — | — | Non-Stop Dance/Come to America |
| 1977 | "Non-Stop Dance" | 42 | — | — | 1 | — | — | 1 | — | — | — | Non-Stop Dance/Come to America |
| 1977 | "Because I Love You" | — | — | — | — | — | — | — | — | — | — | Non-Stop Dance/Come to America |
| 1977 | "Baby It's the Singer" | — | — | — | — | — | 28 | — | — | — | — | By Night |
| 1977 | "Somewhere" (France only) | — | — | — | — | — | — | — | — | — | — | By Night |
| 1977 | "Haunted Love" (Sweden only) | — | — | — | — | — | — | — | — | — | — | By Night |
| 1978 | "Heaven" | — | — | — | — | — | 25 | — | — | — | — | Heaven |
| 1978 | "Jenny" | — | — | — | — | — | — | — | — | — | — | Non-album single |
| 1979 | "Cuba" | 13 | 22 | — | 25 | 1 | 19 | 30 | 41 | 81 | 9 | Cuba |
| 1979 | "Ooh, What a Life" | — | — | — | — | 14 | — | — | 10 | — | 48 | Cuba |
| 1979 | "Better Do It Salsa" | 47 | — | — | — | — | — | — | — | — | — | Cuba |
| 1979 | "Qué será mi vida (If You Should Go)" | 35 | 4 | 9 | 1 | 23 | — | 1 | 5 | — | 8 | Cuba |
| 1980 | "'Cuba/Better Do It Salsa" (UK re-issue) | — | — | — | — | — | — | — | 12 | — | — | Cuba |
| 1980 | "Mariana" | — | 14 | — | — | 16 | — | — | 11 | — | — | On the Riviera |
| 1980 | "Metropolis" | — | — | — | — | — | — | — | — | — | — | On the Riviera |
| 1980 | "Latin America" | 31 | 38 | — | — | — | — | 18 | — | — | — | On the Riviera |
| 1980 | "Dancin' the Mambo" | — | — | — | — | — | — | — | — | — | — | On the Riviera |
| 1981 | "Sheela" | — | — | — | — | — | — | — | — | — | — | Quartier Latin |
| 1981 | "Quartier Latin" | — | — | — | — | — | — | — | — | — | — | Quartier Latin |
| 1982 | "A-Train to Bombay" | — | — | — | — | — | — | — | — | — | — | Quartier Latin |
| 1982 | "My Heart's Beating Wild (Tic Tac Tic Tac)" | 14 | — | — | — | — | — | — | 56 | — | — | Non-album single |
| 1983 | "Silver Nights" | — | — | — | — | — | — | — | — | — | — | Emily |
| 1984 | "Hey Ho (Move Your Body)" | — | — | — | — | — | — | — | — | — | — | Emily |
| 1985 | "Emily" | — | — | — | — | — | — | — | — | — | — | Emily |
| 1986 | "Party Tonight" | — | — | — | — | — | — | — | — | — | — | Non-album singles |
| 1988 | "Ends of the World" | — | — | — | — | — | — | — | — | — | — | Non-album singles |
| 1990 | "Megamix" | — | — | — | — | — | — | — | — | — | — | Non-album singles |
| 1991 | "Let's All Dance" (feat. David Christie) | — | — | — | — | — | — | — | — | — | — | Non-album singles |
| 1992 | "Señora Maria" | — | — | — | — | — | — | — | — | — | — | Non-album singles |
« — » denotes a recording that did not chart or was not released in that territory.
