= Ivri Lider =

Israeli musician

Ivri Lider עברי לידר
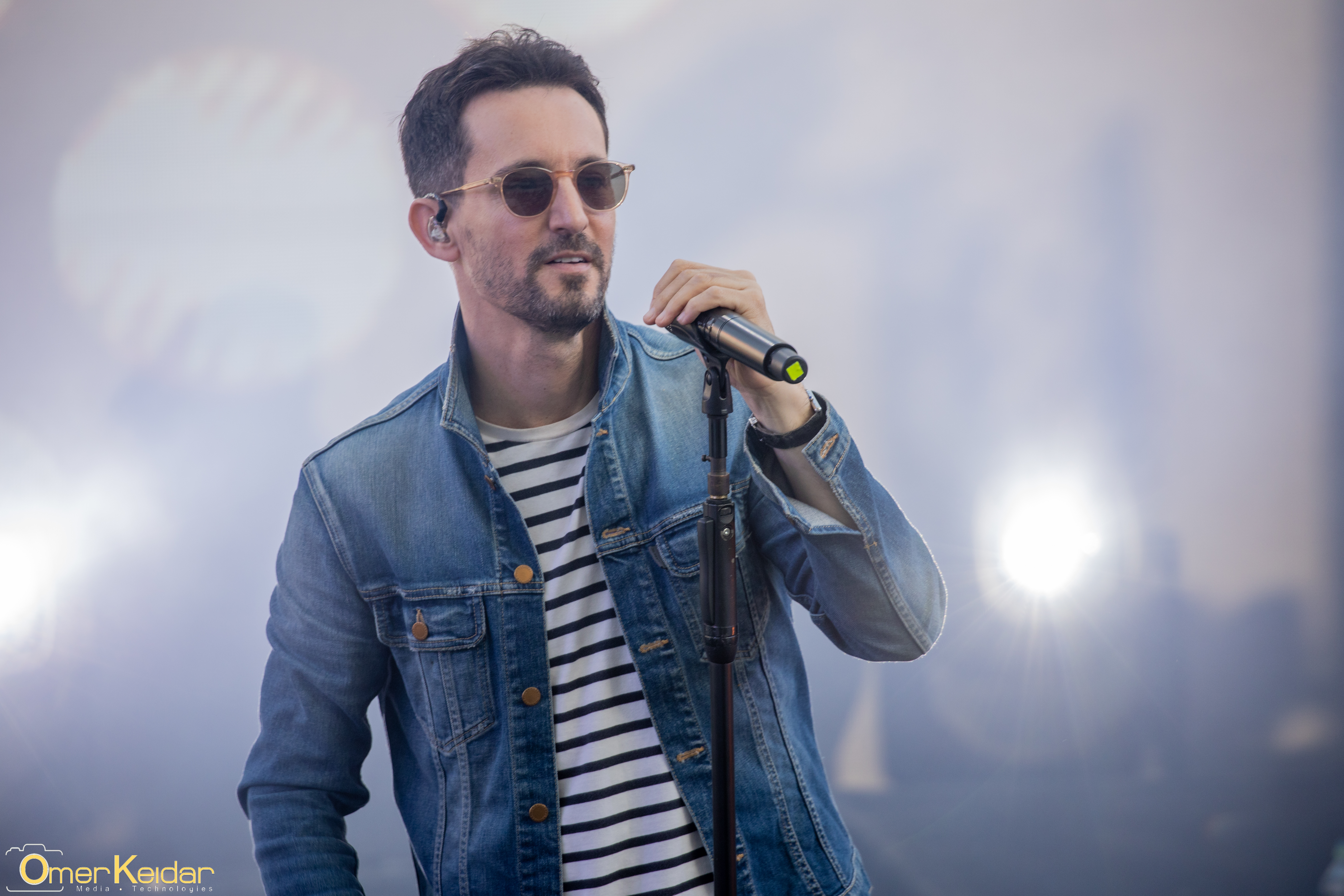
- Lider, 2021

Background information
- Born: 10 February 1974 (age 52); Givat Haim, Israel
- Origin: Givat Haim, Israel
- Genres: Pop rock, rock, baroque pop, electropop, adult contemporary
- Occupations: Singer, songwriter, musician, record producer
- Instruments: Vocals, Piano, Guitar
- Years active: 1997–present
- Label: Helicon
- Website: www.ivrilider.com

Ivri Lider (Hebrew: עברי לידר; born 10 February 1974) is an Israeli pop star and part of the duo TYP, also known as The Young Professionals. He served as a judge on the first season of The X Factor Israel.

== Music career ==
In October 2005 Lider received the "Male Singer of the Year" award from all the major national and local radio stations. He composed most of the soundtrack for the movie The Bubble, and sings the song "Loving That Man of Mine".

In 2008 Lider launched a new Hebrew album and announced an upcoming English album. The music video for his English-language song "Jesse" has received a lot of airtime on LOGO TV, and Out magazine recognized him as a member of the "Out 100" for 2007.

== Personal life ==
Lider is openly gay. In January 2002, Lider spoke openly about his sexual orientation in a cover-story interview to the daily newspaper Maariv, which attracted a lot of attention. He later said, "On a personal level, I felt complete and happy with my life and who I am, and I didn't see any reason to not talk about it. It seemed strange to have an interview and not to talk about it, about my boyfriend, about my life. On a less personal level, I felt it's kind of my obligation. When you're an artist and you're doing well and you're successful, you get a lot of love and appreciation and energy and good things from people, and I think you need to give it back. Maybe I can influence people and help younger people that struggle – help them to be able to change their views, and stuff like that." Lider refused to be drawn into the debate about the Jerusalem gay pride parade. He did, however, accept a booking to play at the Sydney Gay and Lesbian Mardi Gras' "Fair Day" in Camperdown, Australia on Sunday, 21 February 2010.

In 2024 Lider was honored as one of the torchbearers in the national Israeli Independence Day ceremony.

== Discography ==
=== Albums ===
(Titles in italics are the Hebrew transliterations—original titles in Hebrew are in parentheses, wherever applicable)

as Ivri Lider

Year	Album	English translation	Certification	Notes
1997	Melatef Umeshaker (מלטף ומשקר)	Caressing and Lying	Platinum	
1999	Yoter Tov Klum Mikim‘at (יותר טוב כלום מכמעט)	Better Nothing Than Almost	Platinum	
2002	Ha’Anashim HaChadashim (האנשים החדשים)	The New People	Gold	
2005	Ze Lo Oto Davar (זה לא אותו דבר)	It's Not the Same Thing	Gold	
2005	Ivri Lider vs. Henree - Fight			Made available with It's Not the Same Thing and later on separately as well
2006	Live CD		Gold	
2008	Beketzev Ahid Betnu‘ot Shel HaGoof (בקצב אחיד בתנועות של הגוף)	The Steady Rhythm of Body Movements	Gold	
2012	Mishehu Pa‘am (מישהו פעם)	Somebody Once	Gold	
2015	Ha’Ahava HaZot Shelanu (האהבה הזאת שלנו)	This Love of Ours		
2016	Ivri Lider Ofer Meiri (עברי לידר עופר מאירי)	Ivri Lider Ofer Meiri		Collaborative album with Ofer Meiri
			Total sales: 200,000+	

as part of TYP

- 2011: 9am to 5pm, 5pm to Whenever (originally 09:00 to 17:00, 17:00 to Whenever)

=== Movie soundtracks ===
- Yossi & Jagger (2002) – original score and theme song "Bo" (Let's)
- Walk on Water (2004) – original score and theme song "Cinderella Rockafella" duet with Rita
- The Bubble (2006) – original score, theme song "The Man I Love", "Birthday Cake", and ending credits song "Song to a Siren"

=== Group members since 2005 ===
- Ivri Lider
- Yehonatan Sason Fridge
- Amir Rosiano
- Barak Kram
- Adiel Alexander Goldestein
- Roni Arditti
- Ariel Tuchman
- Yogev Mazouz
- Assaf Amdursky
