= Jean Kluger =

Belgian record producer and composer (born 1937)

- Born: Jean Joseph Kluger; 31 March 1937 (age 89); Antwerp, Belgium
- Occupations: Record producer, songwriter, music publisher

Jean Joseph Kluger (born 31 March 1937) is a Belgian record producer, music publisher and composer.

== Biography ==
Jean Kluger was born in Antwerp, Belgium, the eldest son of Jacques and Adela Kluger. His career started in 1957, working for his father's company, World Music. He established his own company, Editions Jean Kluger, after the death of his father in 1963, and in 1965 moved to Paris where he established the company Bleu Blanc Rouge with his wife Huguette Ferly.

He wrote widely for the French, Flemish and international pop music markets, including songs for Sheila, Rika Zaraï, Nana Mouskouri, Petula Clark, Sacha Distel, Ringo, Dalida and Claude François. He also produced many Flemish artists such as Will Tura, Johan Verminnen, John Terra, Marva, and Dana Winner. With Claude Bolling, he established the girl group Les Parisiennes, and published 50 of the songs they recorded. He produced the cult album Le Monde Fabuleux Des Yamasuki, including the track "Aieaoa", later recorded by Bananarama as "Aie a Mwana". With Daniel Vangarde, he wrote all the hits of La Compagnie Creole, The Gibson Brothers and Ottawan, including the international hits "D.I.S.C.O." and "Hands Up (Give Me Your Heart)".

In 2016 he became president of the International Certificate for Piano Artists (ICPA).

== Bibliography ==
- Robert Wangermée, Pascale Vandervellen, Dictionnaire de La chanson. En Wallonie et à Bruxelles, Mardaga, 1995 ISBN 9782870096000
