= Daniel Vangarde =

French songwriter and producer (born 1947)

- Born: Daniel Bangalter; 1947 (age 78–79); Paris, France
- Occupations: Record producer; songwriter
- Years active: 1969–1990s
- Label: Zagora
- Spouse: Thérèse Thoreux (died 2001)
- Children: Thomas Bangalter

Daniel Bangalter (French pronunciation: [danjɛl bɑ̃ɡaltɛʁ], born 1947), known professionally as Daniel Vangarde, is a French former producer, lyricist and songwriter who co-wrote and produced several hit records in the 1970s and 1980s, including "Aie a Mwana" with Jean Kluger, "D.I.S.C.O." by Ottawan, and "Cuba" by the Gibson Brothers. The father of Thomas Bangalter, best known as a member of the former electronic music duo Daft Punk, Vangarde is credited with aiding the duo in their early musical career.

In 1971, Vangarde and Kluger created the dance song "Yamasuki" under the name the Yamasuki Singers, which led to the production of the album Le Monde Fabuleux Des Yamasuki. The album featured the song "Aieaoa", later popularized as "Aie a Mwana" by Black Blood and Bananarama. In 1975, Vangarde founded the record label Zagora, and following the Disco Demolition Night in 1979, he co-wrote the hit "D.I.S.C.O." for the group Ottawan. Over the years, Vangarde produced numerous tracks and albums, often under various aliases.

In the 1990s, Vangarde became involved in disputes over the restitution of royalties to Jewish composers affected during the Nazi occupation of France. After retiring from music, he moved to Brazil, where he engaged in local business ventures. In 2022, Vangarde released a compilation album of his work titled The Vaults of Zagora Records Mastermind (1971-1984) through Because Music.

== Early life and education ==
Daniel Bangalter was born in 1947 in Paris to a French Jewish family.His father was a doctor and his mother was a housewife. As a child, he was exposed to classical music, with his family listening to records of composers such as Johann Sebastian Bach, Wolfgang Amadeus Mozart, Ludwig van Beethoven, or Frédéric Chopin for an hour every night. His father's work as a doctor in theaters allowed Bangalter to attend concerts with him.

As a teenager, Bangalter became heavily inspired by the Beatles, particularly member Paul McCartney. His brother lived in Brighton, England, allowing them to get Beatles records before they were widely available in France. Bangalter once wrote a letter to the band suggesting they let him join, though he ultimately did not send it. Before turning 18, he had traveled to various countries, including spending some time in Mexico. He decided to pursue a career in songwriting and chose a different professional surname because he did not want to be recognized. Originally, he wanted to use the surname "Morane" after the Morane-Saulnier planes, but when registering with SACEM, he found it had already been taken. Instead, he chose the name "Vangarde" after the Vickers Vanguard.

== Musical career ==
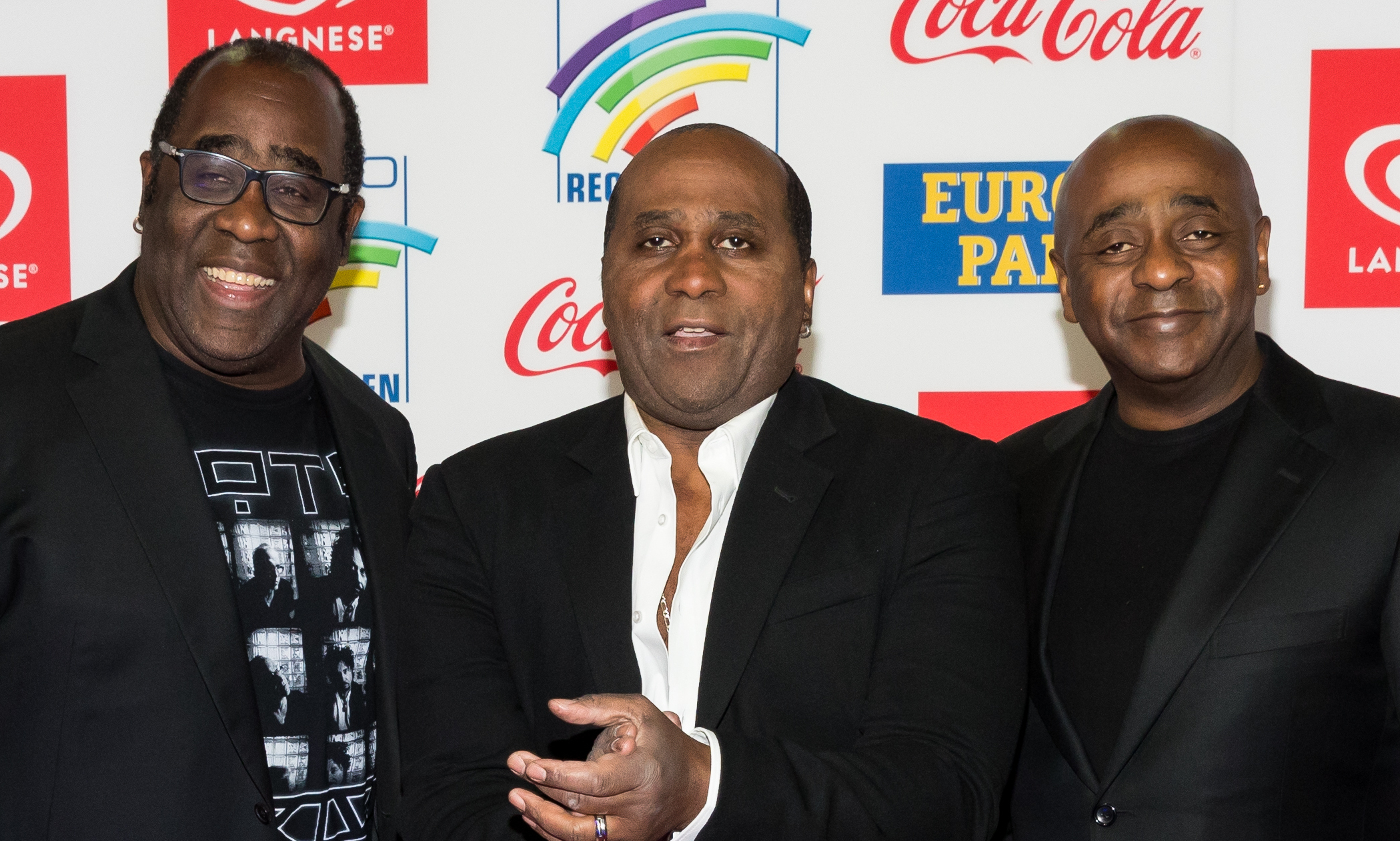
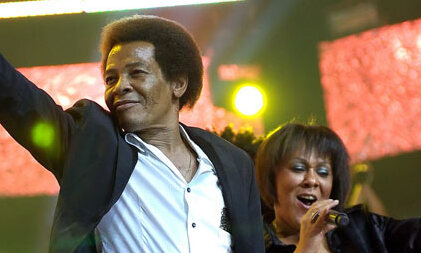
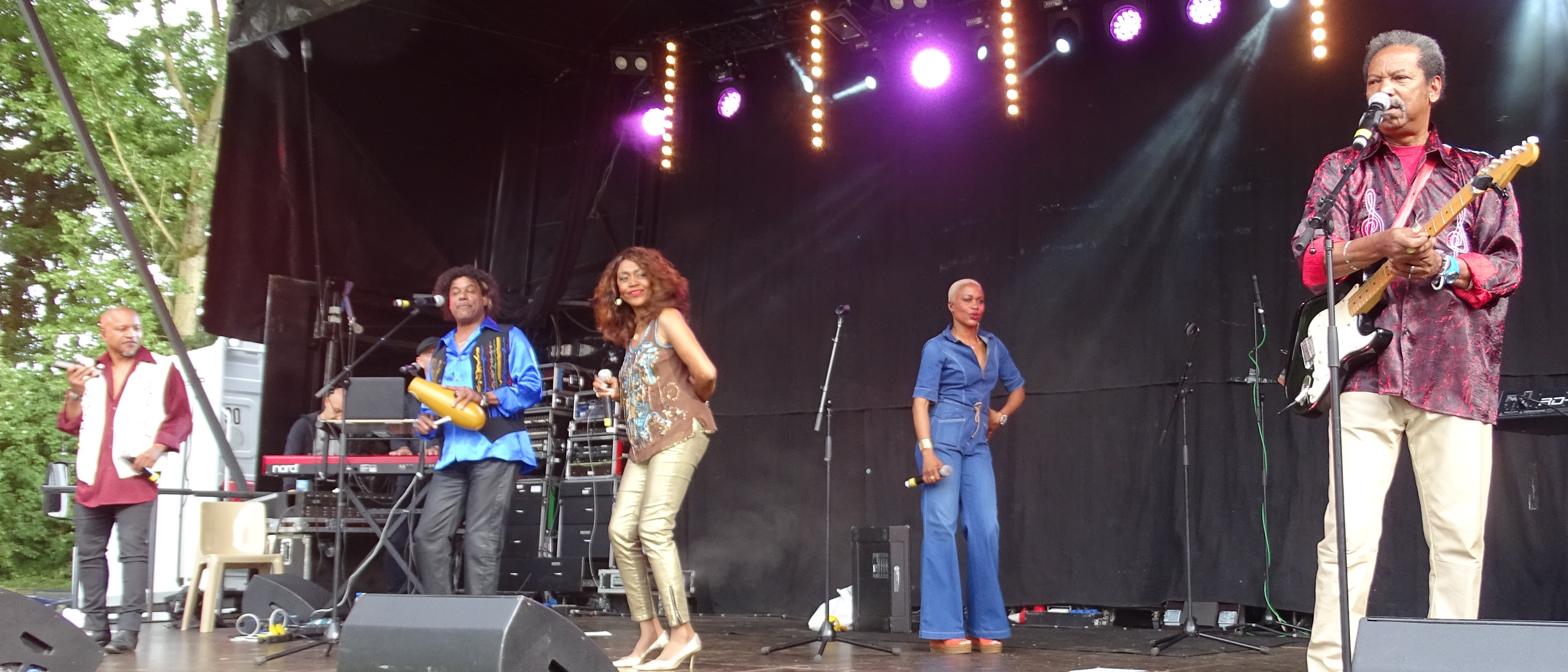
Vangarde helped produced hits for French groups the Gibson Brothers (left), Ottawan (right) and La Compagnie Créole (bottom).

While traveling, Vangarde stayed in the Netherlands, where he performed at a club. He was noticed by a woman who advised him to contact her father, a record company boss. A demo recording reached Belgian producer Jean Kluger, who believed he could replicate the success of Michel Polnareff with Vangarde. However, Vangarde did not see himself in the spotlight and instead began writing songs with Kluger. Vangarde's first success came from choreographing a dance for the song "Casatschok," produced by Kluger for Dimitri Dourakine.

In 1971, along with Kluger, Vangarde created the dance song "Yamasuki" under the name the Yamasuki Singers. Due to its positive reception, they decided to produce the album Le Monde Fabuleux Des Yamasuki, a pseudo-Japanese concept album of pop songs. The song "Aieaoa" from the album was later recorded as "Aie a Mwana", first by Black Blood and then by Bananarama, becoming the first UK hit for the latter group.

In 1975, Vangarde launched the record label Zagora in order to be independent when producing his music. He recorded his debut album, Daniel Vangarde, featuring lyrics centered on protest themes. The lead single, "Un bombardier avec ses bombes", criticized France's involvement in the international arms trade and resulted in his ban from French radio. In 1976, Vangarde collaborated with Martinican brothers Chris, Alex, and Patrick Francfort, who formed the Gibson Brothers, and wrote the song "Come to America" for them. Two years later, Vangarde wrote "Cuba", which would earn the group fourteen gold records.

After the Disco Demolition Night on 12 July 1979, Vangarde wrote the song "D.I.S.C.O." as a response, viewing that night as "racist" and "homophobic". He aimed to convey that disco had not died on that night. He and Jean Kluger helped create the group Ottawan with Patrick Jean-Baptiste and Annette Eltice, with the single reaching number two in the UK Singles Chart the following year. Vangarde also produced the album Blogodo for the band La Compagnie Créole, who he found while travelling to the West Indies. He persuaded the band to record the song "C'est bon pour le moral," but it initially struggled to gain popularity. Vangarde recounted that a radio station program director had dismissed the track, describing it as "ballroom music". While collaborating with artists for song productions, Vangarde also produced songs under the aliases of Starbow and Who's Who.

In the 1990s, Vangarde was involved in disputes over the issue of Jewish composers and their intellectual property rights during the Nazi occupation of France. He accused SACEM of withholding funds from these Jewish musicians after the nation's liberation, which they denied asserting that they had paid what was owed. In response to the controversy, the French government established the Matteoli Commission to investigate the claims. The commission found no mishandlings and cleared SACEM of misappropriating royalties. With the dispute and Thomas's work with Daft Punk being released, Vangarde decided to retire. In a 2022 interview with NME, he said, "I was doing dance music, and when I heard Daft Punk, I said: 'No, it's a new generation coming. I cannot compete with this music.'"

== Retirement and resurgence ==
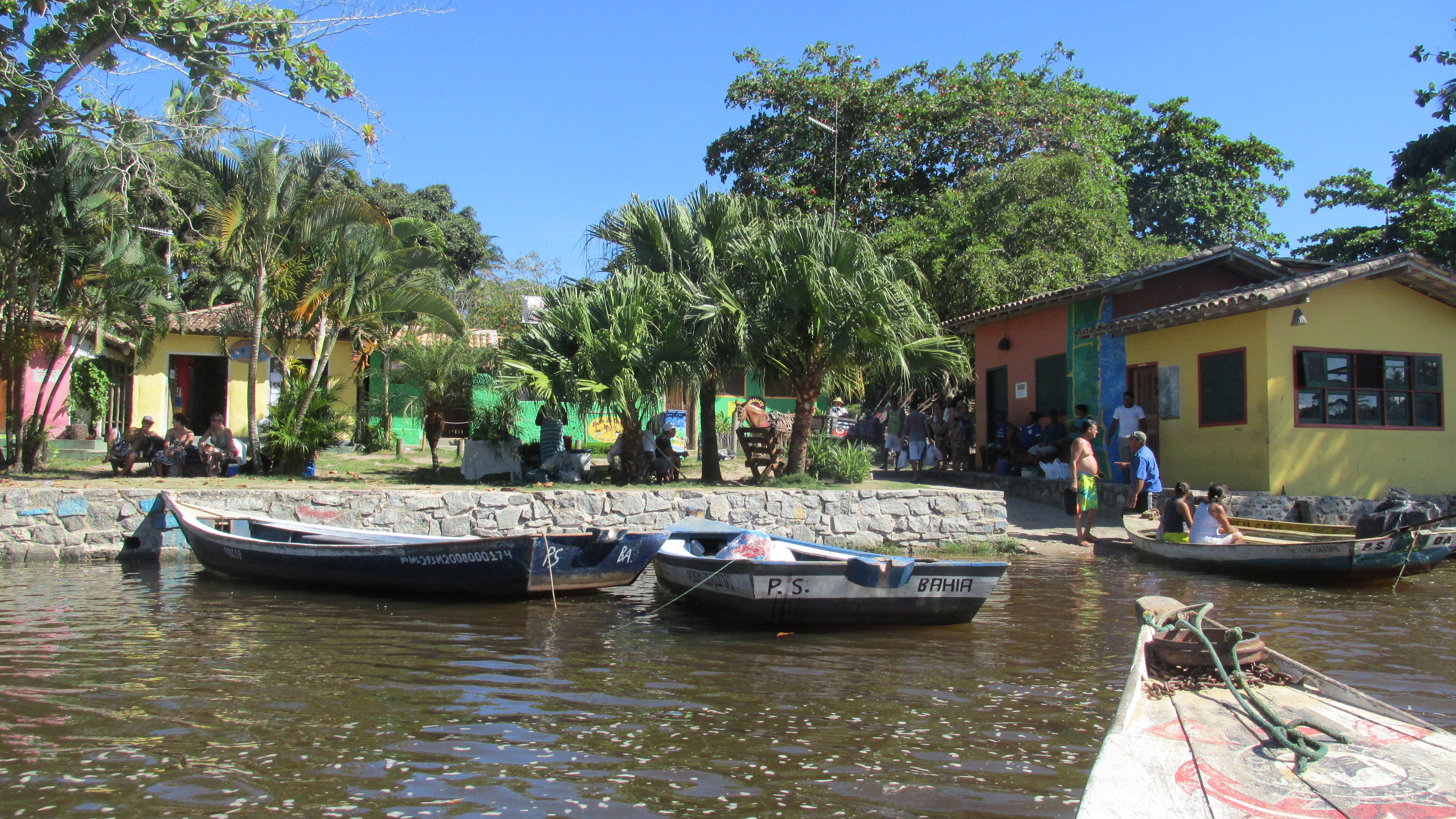
After retiring, Vangarde moved to Caraíva, Bahia, Brazil.

After his retirement, Vangarde moved to Caraíva, Bahia, Brazil. There, he opened various businesses, including a pizzeria, an inn, and a store. He also became one of the founders of the non-governmental organization CaraivaViva, a community charity which provides education through the arts for children. On 23 August 2021, Vangarde's factory of artisanal beauty products was closed by the Sanitary Surveillance of Porto Seguro. The items lacked information about the chemicals used and did not provide usage guidance. Additionally, the interior space of the store, where the products were manufactured, did not meet sanitary legislation requirements.

In October 2022, Vangarde was approached by the label Because Music to compile an album featuring songs from Zagora Records. In early November 2022, Vangarde announced the release of the compilation album The Vaults of Zagora Records Mastermind (1971-1984). The album featured a catalog of Vangarde's work, including his collaborations with various artists and groups. The album was released on 25 November by on streaming platforms, double vinyl LP, and CD.

== Artistry and legacy ==
Vangarde has been praised for his approach to production and songwriting. His production on "Cuba" was described by the Los Angeles Times as a "thatched roof-of-sound production", calling the song "dance music at its most intelligent and irresistible". French producer Bertrand Burgalat described Vangarde as "one of the most singular personalities of his time" for his work in disco music production. In 2013, musician CK303 made a DJ mix of Vangarde's work for the magazine Dazed, noting his "incorporation of world music influences into disco/pop records was quite novel".

Songs by Vangarde for the Yamasuki Singers have been featured in various forms of media. The Guardian described their album as "a mad, cartoonish blend of different musical cultures that also attempted to provoke what would now be called a 'dance challenge.'" In 2007, singer Erykah Badu sampled the Yamasuki Singers' song "Kono Samurai" in her track "The Healer" from the album New Amerykah Part One (4th World War). Their music has also appeared in the DJ mix album Late Night Tales: Matt Helders by the Arctic Monkeys and in the second season of the FX series Fargo.

== Personal life ==
Vangarde is French Jewish. He married Thérèse Thoreux, a ballet dancer who later became a mosaic artist, who had been introduced to him by Vangarde's sister. They had one son, Thomas Bangalter, on 3 January 1975; Thoreux died in 2001. Initially, Thomas was more interested in film and classical dance than music, but Thoreux had him learn piano from the ages of six to twelve. He rarely visited Vangarde's studios, with Vangarde commenting, "If he had been into music, Daft Punk would not have existed. He would have been in the studio with me and he would have learned how to produce music and how to do music the normal way." He bought equipment for Thomas's 18th birthday, including a Roland Juno-106 synthesizer and an Akai S01 sampler. Thomas credited Vangarde with showing him how the record industry worked and helping Daft Punk in the early stages of their career. Vangarde was acknowledged in the liner notes of Daft Punk's debut album Homework for providing "precious advice" and in Discovery for concept and art direction.

== Discography ==
- Daniel Vangarde (1975)
- The Vaults of Zagora Records Mastermind (1971-1984) (2022)
