= N-Trance discography =

- Studio albums: 3
- Soundtrack albums: 6
- Compilation albums: 1
- Singles: 19
- Music videos: 15

This is the discography of the British electronic music group N-Trance. The band has released two studio albums, one compilation album and seventeen singles. After originally being signed by 380 Records (part of PWL) for a year, they signed to the independent dance record label All Around the World (AATW) in 1992. Most of their work is released by AATW in the United Kingdom, but they have also been released in Europe, the United States and the rest of the world.

== Albums ==
=== Studio albums ===
Title	Album details	Peak chart positions			
Title	Album details	UK	AUS	FIN	NZ
Electronic Pleasure	Released: November 1995; Label: All Around the World; Format: CD	99	65	15	—
Happy Hour	Released: February 1998; Label: All Around the World; Format: CD	—	79	—	31
The Mind of the Machine (download only)	Released: 2009	—	—	—	—

=== Compilations ===
- The Best of N-Trance 1992–2002 (2001)

== Singles ==
Year	Title	Peak chart positions											Certifications	Album
Year	Title	UK	AUS	AUT	FIN	FRA	GER	IRE	NED	NZ	SWE	SWI	Certifications	Album
1993	"Set You Free" (featuring Kelly Llorenna)	39	—	—	—	—	—	—	—	—	—	—		Electronic Pleasure
1994	"Turn Up the Power"	23	118	—	—	—	—	—	—	—	—	—		Electronic Pleasure
1995	"Set You Free" (featuring Kelly Llorenna) (re-recording)	2	11	—	—	—	44	4	9	—	15	18	UK: 2× Platinum; AUS: Gold	Electronic Pleasure
1995	"Stayin' Alive" (featuring Ricardo da Force)	2	1	5	2	4	3	4	12	3	5	2	UK: Silver; AUS: 2× Platinum; GER: Gold	Electronic Pleasure
1996	"Electronic Pleasure"	11	100	—	—	23	—	—	—	—	58	—		Electronic Pleasure
1997	"D.I.S.C.O."	11	82	29	10	—	—	10	82	—	—	—		Happy Hour
1997	"The Mind of the Machine"	15	—	—	—	—	—	—	—	—	—	—		Happy Hour
1997	"Da Ya Think I'm Sexy?" (featuring Rod Stewart)	7	3	9	5	33	15	10	23	1	15	21	AUS: 2× Platinum	Happy Hour
1998	"Paradise City"	28	35	—	—	—	—	—	—	4	40	—		Happy Hour
1998	"Tears in the Rain"	53	188	—	—	—	—	—	—	—	—	—		Happy Hour
1999	"Broken Dreams"	—	194	—	—	—	—	—	—	43	—	—		Happy Hour
2000	"Shake Ya Body"	37	—	—	—	—	—	—	—	—	—	—		The Best of N-Trance 1992–2002
2001	"Set You Free 2001"	4	—	61	—	—	38	18	—	—	—	80		The Best of N-Trance 1992–2002
2002	"Forever"	6	—	—	—	—	—	29	—	—	—	—		The Best of N-Trance 1992–2002
2003	"Destiny"	37	—	—	—	—	—	—	—	—	—	—		Single release only
2004	"I'm in Heaven"	46	—	—	—	—	—	—	—	—	—	—		Single release only
2005	"Set You Free 2001" (re-entry)	64	—	—	—	—	—	—	—	—	—	—		Single release only
2009	"Nothing Lasts Forever"	-	—	—	—	—	—	—	—	—	—	—		Single release only
2026	"Higher"	—	—	—	—	—	—	—	—	—	—	—		Single release only

== Music videos ==
Year	Title	Director
1994	"Turn Up the Power"	Steve Price
1995	"Set You Free"	Steve Price
1995	"Stayin' Alive"	Alex DeRakoff
1996	"Electronic Pleasure"	Steve Price
1997	"D.I.S.C.O."	Graham Hector
1997	"The Mind of the Machine"	Graham Hector
1997	"Da Ya Think I'm Sexy?"	Graham Hector
1998	"Paradise City"	Graham Hector
1998	"Tears in the Rain"	Graham Hector
1999	"Broken Dreams"	
2000	"Shake Ya Body"	Nigel Simpkiss
2001	"Set You Free 2001"	Steve Price
2002	"Forever"	Damian Bromley
2003	"Destiny"	Marc Raymond Wilkins/Michael Menke
2004	"I'm in Heaven"	Quiros Entertainment
2026	"Higher"	Mikey Davies - Flexxed

== See also ==
- N-Trance
- Freeloaders (band)
