= The Best of N-Trance 1992–2002 =

Greatest hits album by N-Trance
- Released: 11 November 2001
- Recorded: 1992–2001
- Length: 76:11
- Label: All Around the World
- Producer: N-Trance; Big Jim Sullivan; Rob Searle; Serano

N-Trance chronology
Happy Hour (1998)	The Best of N-Trance 1992–2002 (2001)	The Mind of the Machine (2009)

Japanese album cover
- Japanese version of the album cover

Singles from The Best of N-Trance 1992–2002
- 1. "Shake Ya Body" Released: 20 May 2000; 2. "Set You Free 2001" Released: 22 September 2001; 3. "Forever" Released: 2 September 2002

Professional ratings
Review scores
Source	Rating
AllMusic	Link

The Best of N-Trance 1992–2002 is the greatest hits album released by the British electronic music group N-Trance.

== Track listing ==
All music is composed by N-Trance.

UK track listing
No.	Title	Writer(s)	Length
1.	"Set You Free" (Rob Searle Radio Edit)	Lewis, Longworth, O'Toole	3:39
2.	"Forever"	O'Toole	3:54
3.	"Stayin' Alive"	Gibb, Gibb, Gibb, Longworth, Lyte, O'Toole	4:05
4.	"Turn Up the Power"	Longworth, O'Toole	3:56
5.	"Electronic Pleasure"	Longworth, Lyte, O'Toole	3:51
6.	"Da Ya Think I'm Sexy?"	Appice, Stewart	4:20
7.	"D.I.S.C.O."	Kluger, Lyte, Vangarde	4:23
8.	"Te Quiero"	O'Toole	4:09
9.	"Broken Dreams"	George, Lang, Longworth, Lyte, O'Toole, Page	4:13
10.	"Paradise City"	Adler, McKagan, Rose, Slash, Stradlin	4:31
11.	"Shake Ya Body"	Jackson	3:24
12.	"Tears in the Rain"	Longworth, O'Toole	3:35
13.	"The Mind of The Machine"	Longworth, O'Toole	3:37
14.	"Violent Mechanical Psychopath"	Longworth, O'Toole, Stokes	4:06
15.	"Turn Up the Power" (Dark Mix)	Longworth, O'Toole	5:06
16.	"Set You Free" (Original 12")	Lewis, Longworth, O'Toole	7:16
17.	"N-Trance Megamix"	Appice, Gibb, Hutchings, Jackson, Lewis, Longworth, Lyte, O'Toole, Stewart, Stokes	8:06
Total length:			76:11

Japanese track listing
No.	Title	Length
1.	"Set You Free" (Rob Searle Remix)	3:38
2.	"Stayin' Alive" (Radio Version)	4:05
3.	"Da Ya Think I'm Sexy?" (Ultimate Radio)	3:37
4.	"D.I.S.C.O." (Radio Version)	4:22
5.	"Paradise City" (Ultimate Radio)	4:06
6.	"Forever" (Voodoo and Serano Edit)	3:37
7.	"Electronic Pleasure" (Radio Edit)	3:51
8.	"Turn Up The Power" (Radio Edit)	3:55
9.	"Broken Dreams" (Radio Version)	4:13
10.	"Shake Ya Body" (Ultimate Radio)	2:44
11.	"Te Quiero 2001"	4:08
12.	"Tears in the Rain" (Radio Edit)	3:35
13.	"The Mind of the Machine" (Radio Edit)	3:36
14.	"Violent Mechanical Psychopath"	3:05
15.	"Set You Free" (Original Radio Mix)	4:09
16.	"Set You Free" (Voodoo and Serano Edit)	3:19
17.	"Forever" (Infinity Mix)	4:16
18.	"N-Trance Megamix"	8:06
Total length:		72:22

== Personnel ==
- Martin Ansell – vocals
- Vinny Burns – guitar
- Ricardo da Force – rap
- David Grant – vocals
- Lee Limer – vocals
- Kelly Llorenna – vocals
- Rachel McFarlane – vocals
- Sandy McLelland – vocals
- N-Trance, Dale Longworth, Kevin O'Toole – main performer, producer
- Nobby – engineer
- Rob Searle – remixing, producer, mixing
- Serano – remixing, producer
- Jerome Stokes – vocals, background vocals
- Big Jim Sullivan – producer, mixing
- Gillian Wisdom – vocals
- Viveen Wray – vocals
- Recording owned by All Around the World
- Distributed by Universal
- Marketed by Absolute Marketing and Distribution (AMD)

== Release history ==
Country	Release date	Label	Catalog
United Kingdom	11 November 2001	All Around the World	GLOBECD26
Japan	2 July 2002	Toshiba EMI Ltd	TOCP-64167
