= List of Eurodance artists =

The following is a list of Eurodance artists. Eurodance, which is also known as Eurohouse or Euro-NRG, is a genre of electronic dance music that originated in the late 1980s primarily in Europe. It combines elements from house, techno and hip hop.

Contents
0–9 A B C D E F G H I J K L M N O P R S T U V W Y

== 0–9 ==
- 20 Fingers
- 2 Brothers on the 4th Floor
- 2 Fabiola
- 2 Unlimited
- 89ers

== A ==
- A*Teens
- Ace of Base
- Aikakone
- Alcazar
- Alexia
- Alice Deejay
- Amber
- Antique
- Aqua
- Army of Lovers
- ATC

== B ==
- Basic Element
- Basshunter
- Bellini
- B.G., the Prince of Rap
- Black Box
- La Bouche

== C ==
- Cappella
- Captain Hollywood Project
- Captain Jack
- Captain Jeff
- Cascada
- Centory
- Alex Christensen
- Le Click
- Colonia
- Corona
- Tina Cousins
- Crazy Frog
- Culture Beat
- Cut 'N' Move

== D ==
- Daze
- Def Dames Dope
- DHT
- DJ BoBo
- DJ Encore
- DJ Manian
- DJ Sammy
- Dr. Alban
- Dune

== E ==
- E-Rotic
- E-Type
- Eiffel 65
- Electro Team
- Eu4ya
- Tania Evans

== F ==
- Fragma
- Fun Factory

== G ==
- Gala
- General Base
- Groove Coverage
- Günther

== H ==
- Haddaway

== I ==
- Ian Van Dahl
- Ice MC
- Infernal
- Infinity
- Inna

== J ==
- Jenny B
- Jam & Spoon
- Jessica Folcker

== K ==
- Leila K
- Nosie Katzmann
- Kim Kay

== L ==
- Livin' Joy
- Loft
- Love Inc.

== M ==
- Magic Affair
- Masterboy
- Maxx
- Melodie MC
- Milk Inc.
- Mo-Do
- Movetron
- Mr. President

== N ==
- N-Trance
- No Mercy
- Neneh Cherry

== O ==
- O-Zone

== P ==
- Pandora
- Paradisio
- Pharao
- Prince Ital Joe

== R ==
- R.I.O.
- Real McCoy
- Rednex
- Reset
- Ruki Vverh!
- Kate Ryan

== S ==
- Sash!
- Santamaria
- Scooch
- Scooter
- September
- Serebro
- Shanadoo
- Snap!
- Solid Base
- Sound Factory
- Soundstream
- Spagna
- Alexandra Stan
- Staxx of Joy
- Sunblock

== T ==
- T-Spoon
- Technotronic
- Melanie Thornton
- Twenty 4 Seven

== U ==
- U96
- Urban Cookie Collective

== V ==
- Vengaboys

== W ==
- Waldo's People
- Whigfield

== Y ==
- Yanou

== See also ==
- List of Eurodance songs
