= All over the UK =

All Over the UK

Studio album by Force & Styles
- Released: 26 August 1996
- Recorded: 1995–1996 at UK Dance Studios, Clacton-on-Sea
- Genre: Happy hardcore
- Label: United Dance
- Producer: Force & Styles, Eruption, Dougal

Darren Styles chronology
All Over the UK (1996)	Skydivin' (2008)

Professional ratings
Review scores
Source	Rating
Muzik	3/5 stars

All Over the UK is the debut studio album by British happy hardcore musicians Force & Styles released on 26 August 1996 on United Dance Recordings.

== Background ==
After working together since 1993 as part of DJ Force & the Evolution (with James Broomfield and Paul Hughes), Paul Hobbs and Darren Mew formed Force & Styles in 1995. They founded their own independent record label UK Dance Records to release their recordings and the duo released numerous 12-inch singles during the mid-1990s. All over the UK was recorded at their studio in Clacton-on-Sea, Essex and the album was released on DJ Eruption's United Dance Recordings label on 26 August 1996 and peaked at No. 103 on the UK Albums Chart.

Although most of the songs were released as 12-inch singles on Force & Styles' own UK Dance Records label, two songs from the album were later released as singles on the Diverse record label. "Paradise & Dreams" featuring Junior was released in October 1996 and peaked at No. 106 on the UK Singles Chart and a remixed version of "Heart of Gold" with additional production by pop record producer Eliot Kennedy and ex-Dead or Alive members Tim Lever and Mike Percy featuring vocals from Kelly Llorenna was released in July 1998 and peaked at No. 55 in the UK Singles Chart. Several tracks from this album would later appear on Force & Styles' compilation album Heart of Gold (2000).

"Heart of Gold" was later recorded and released by Kelly Llorenna as a solo single in 2002. This recording of the song was produced by Flip & Fill and peaked higher than the original Force & Styles recording, reaching No. 19 in the charts. In 2003, "Pretty Green Eyes" was covered by Ultrabeat and reached No. 2 in the charts. Several other of Force & Styles' songs would later be covered by Ultrabeat and Flip & Fill, such as "Field of Dreams" (Flip & Fill feat. Jo James), "Frankie's Lead" (Ultrabeat) and "Pacific Sun" (Flip & Fill feat. Junior and Ultrabeat). "Paradise & Dreams" was covered by The Force (Paul Hobbs and Flip & Fill) in 2003 and by Ultrabeat vs. Darren Styles in 2007.

== Track listing ==
No.	Title	Writer(s)	Length
1.	"Heart of Gold" (feat. Jenna)	Paul Hobbs, Darren Mew	7:46
2.	"Paradise & Dreams" (feat. Junior)	Hobbs, Mew, Leon Van Brown	5:31
3.	"Harmony"	Hobbs, Mew	5:08
4.	"Shining Down" (Slipmatt remix, feat. Jenna)	Hobbs, Mew	5:42
5.	"Remember the Vibe" (feat. Junior)	Hobbs, Mew, Van Brown	5:39
6.	"I'm Gonna Get Ya" (Eruption & Dougal feat. Jenna, Force & Styles remix)	Paul Clarke, Chris Brown	5:54
7.	"Frankie's Lead"	Hobbs, Mew	5:08
8.	"Pretty Green Eyes" (Eruption remix, feat. Junior)	Hobbs, Mew, Van Brown	6:28
9.	"All Over" (Force & Styles remix)	Hobbs, Mew	5:34
10.	"Wonderland" (Dougal remix, feat. Jenna)	Hobbs, Mew	5:23
11.	"Apollo 13 (Part 1)"	Hobbs, Mew	6:37
12.	"Fun Fair" (Force & Styles remix)	Hobbs, Mew	5:53

== Personnel ==
Force & Styles

- Paul Hobbs – producer (all tracks except track 6), remixing (tracks 6, 9 & 12)
- Darren Mew – producer (all tracks except track 6), remixing (tracks 6, 9 & 12)

Production

- Eruption – producer (track 6), remixing (track 8)
- Dougal – producer (track 6), remixing (track 10)
- Slipmatt – remixing (track 4)

Additional musicians

- Jenna – vocals (tracks 1, 4, 6 & 10)
- Junior – vocals (tracks 2, 5 & 8)

== Chart performance ==
Chart (1996)	Peak position
UK Albums Chart	103

== Release history ==
Region	Date	Label	Format	Catalog
United Kingdom	26 August 1996	United Dance	CD, LP	UMCD002, UMLP002
