= Shades of Rhythm =

English electronic dance music group

Shades of Rhythm are an English electronic dance music group most active from the late 1980s to the mid-1990s, still performing live today and hailing from Peterborough in 1988. They are best known for being a part of the early '90s rave scene.

== Career ==
Shades of Rhythm were signed to ZTT Records. Their debut single release was "Homicide"/"Exorcist" in January 1991. This was followed in April by "Sweet Sensation" (which sampled Patti LaBelle's "Something Special (Is Gonna Happen Tonight)" from her 1986 album Winner in You), and then "The Sound of Eden" which was a #35 UK Singles Chart hit in August that same year. The next release was "Extacy" which peaked at #16 in December 1991. Their debut album Shades (ZTT 11, later reissued as The Album) sold over 50,000 copies, and they remixed "Set You Free" by N-Trance. All these recordings were supported by live appearances at raves, such as Technodrome and Fantazia.

In March 1991, the British music magazine, NME, reported that Shades of Rhythm were appearing at the 'Great Indie Festival - A Midsummer's Day Dream' at Milton Keynes Bowl in June that year. Also on the bill were 808 State, Gary Clail, New Fast Automatic Daffodils, The Shamen, Paris Angels plus Flowered Up.

Shades of Rhythm released "Sweet Revival (Keep It Comin')" in February 1993, followed in May by "Getting Away". Their time with the record label was rounded off with a #37 UK chart placing for the reissue of "The Sound of Eden", which featured X-Press 2, Chris Coco, Joey Negro and Richie Hawtin. Their final chart outing was in June 1997, when "Psycho Base" spent one week at #57 on Coalition Records.

Shades of Rhythm also regularly appeared on some of the dance compilation albums of the day, such as Deep Heat, Total Science, Cream Live, Hard Fax, Essential Hardcore and ZTT's own Zance. "The Sound of Eden" has also been covered by two different British dance acts, Casino in 1997 and Another Chance in 2007 - the latter titled "Everytime I See Her (Sound Of Eden)".

In later years, group members Kevin Lancaster and Nick Slater joined to form the breakbeat duo the Drumattic Twins.

== Group members ==
- Kevin Lancaster
- Nick Slater
- Rayan Hepburn

== Discography ==
=== Albums ===
- 1990: Frequency (S.O.R. Recordings)
- 1991: Shades (ZTT) - UK #51
- 1992: The Album (ZTT)

=== Singles ===
- 1991: "Homicide"/"Exorcist" - UK #53
- 1991: "Sweet Sensation" - UK #54
- 1991: "The Sound of Eden" - UK #35
- 1991: "Extacy" - UK #16
- 1993: "Sweet Revival (Keep It Comin')" - UK #61
- 1993: "Getting Away" - UK #81
- 1993: "The Sound of Eden" (reissue) - UK #37
- 1994: "The Wandering Dragon" - UK #55
- 1997: "Psycho Base" - UK #57
