= Electronic Pleasure (song) =

1996 single by N-Trance

Single by N-Trance

from the album Electronic Pleasure
- B-side: "Remixes"
- Released: 24 February 1996
- Recorded: 1995, Marcus Studios, London Out Of The Blue, Manchester
- Genre: Dance-pop; Eurodance
- Length: 3:52
- Label: All Around the World
- Songwriters: Dale Longworth; Kevin O'Toole; Ricardo Lyte
- Producers: Dale Longworth; Kevin O'Toole

N-Trance singles chronology
"Stayin' Alive '95" (1995)	"Electronic Pleasure" (1996)	"D.I.S.C.O." (1997)

Music video
- "Electronic Pleasure" on YouTube

"Electronic Pleasure" is a song by English electronic music group N-Trance, featuring vocals from Gillian Wisdom and Viveen Wray, and rap by Ricardo da Force. Released in February 1996 by label All Around the World as the fourth and last single from the group's debut album by the same name (1995), it was the follow-up to their successful cover of "Stayin' Alive". It is written by Dale Longworth and Kevin O'Toole with da Force, and produced by Longworth and O'Toole. The song peaked at number two in Israel, number nine in Scotland and number eleven on the UK Singles Chart. Additionally, it was a top-20 hit in Italy and a top-30 hit in France, peaking at numbers 17 and 23, respectively. The accompanying music video was directed by Steve Price and filmed in Surrey, the UK.

== Critical reception ==
Maria Jimenez from Music & Media described the song as a "spacious electro pop dance number". A reviewer from Music Week gave it a score of three out of five. Music Week editor Alan Jones added, "It features the same guests, vocalist Gillian Wisdom and rapper Ricardo da Force, but is an edgy Euro-style dance track more like the earlier N-Trance hits." James Hyman from the Record Mirror Dance Update gave it four out of five, writing, "N-Trance must be commended for musical versatility: after screaming rave and obvious yet effective disco pastiche they hit back with high-end Euro that echoes Snap's 'Rhythm Is a Dancer'."

James Hamilton named it an "Gillian Wisdom wailed Euro-style raver" in his weekly Record Mirror dance column. Helen Lamont from Smash Hits gave the single four out of five, writing, "'Electronic Pleasure' makes a move away from the 70's disco tomfoolery of 'Stayin' Alive', back toward the serious business of making fine dance toons. No top bleep-bleep-twiddle like 'Set You Free' here though, as the lads mix their rave heritage with Ricardo da Force's rap vocals and come up with a KLF-type sound. N-Trance: Justified Ancients of Rave Music. Uh-huh."

== Chart performance ==
"Electronic Pleasure" was a notable hit on the charts in Europe, Australia and Israel, although it didn't reach the same level of success as its predecessor, "Stayin' Alive '95". The song entered the top 20 in the UK, peaking at number 11 in its first week on the UK Singles Chart on February 18, 1996, just barely missing the top 10. It spent one week at that position and within the top 20, before dropping to number 26 the following week. In Scotland however, the song entered the top 10, peaking at number nine. "Electronic Pleasure" was a top-20 hit also in Italy (17) and a top-30 hit in France (23), while reaching the top 60 in Sweden (58). On the Eurochart Hot 100, it peaked at number 69 in March 1996. Outside Europe, the single made its way to number two in Israel in February same year, and number 100 in Australia.

== Music video ==
A music video was produced to promote the single, directed by Steve Price. It was filmed on a Saturday morning at 3.30 a.m. in Surrey. The video was shot in a freezing cold morgue in the disused Prestwich Mental Hospital and also features a World War II army tank. In the video, the group is performing in front of a large crowd at what appears to be a rave party in an abandoned building. Other scenes shows rapper Da Force outside, surrounded by fires and a burning car. Singer Wisdom appears at the party as a mysterious alien-like figure, wearing a white rubber bodysuit and extended long white nails. Price had previously directed the video for the group's debut-single, "Set You Free".

== Track listing ==
- 12" maxi-single, Italy (1996)

A1. "Electronic Pleasure" (Electronic Pressure) — 5:06
A2. "Electronic Pleasure" (303 Mix) — 5:03
B. "Electronic Pleasure" (Dark Mix) — 7:05

- CD single, UK (1996)
1. "Electronic Pleasure" (Original Version) — 3:52
2. "Electronic Pleasure" (Tokyo Mix) — 6:41
3. "Electronic Pleasure" (Dark Mix) — 7:06
4. "Electronic Pleasure" (Sunshine State Mix) — 6:08
5. "Electronic Pleasure" (Electronic Pressure) — 5:08
6. "Electronic Pleasure" (Bagheads Remix) — 5:56
7. "Electronic Pleasure" (303 Mix) — 5:03
- CD single, the Netherlands (1996)
1. "Electronic Pleasure" (Original Version) — 3:49
2. "Electronic Pleasure" (Sunshine State Remix) — 6:07
- CD single (Electronic Pleasure 2), UK (1996)
1. "Electronic Pleasure" (Original Extended Version) — 5:48
2. "Set You Free" (Original 12" Version) — 7:16
3. "Stayin' Alive '95" — 4:06
4. "Electronic Pleasure" (Looney Choons Remix) — 7:30
- CD maxi-single, Europe (1996)
1. "Electronic Pleasure" (Original Radio Version) — 3:51
2. "Electronic Pleasure" (Original Mix) — 5:45
3. "Electronic Pleasure" (D-Generator Mix) — 6:45
4. "Electronic Pleasure" (Quicksilver Mix) — 8:07
5. "Electronic Pleasure" (Dark Mix) — 7:04
6. "Electronic Pleasure" (Tokyo Mix) — 6:40
7. "Electronic Pleasure" (Looney Choons Remix) — 7:29
8. "Electronic Pleasure" (Bag Heads Remix) — 5:56

== Charts ==
Chart (1996)	Peak position
Australia (ARIA)	100
Europe (Eurochart Hot 100)	69
France (SNEP)	23
Israel (Israeli Singles Chart)	2
Italy (Musica e dischi)	17
Scotland (OCC)	9
Sweden (Sverigetopplistan)	58
UK Singles (OCC)	11
UK Club Chart (Music Week)	12
