= Heart of Gold (Force & Styles song) =

1996 song written and recorded by Force & Styles

Single by Force & Styles

from the album All over the UK
- Released: 13 July 1998
- Genre: Happy hardcore
- Length: 7:59 (1996 version); 4:23 (1998 version)
- Label: Diverse
- Songwriter(s): Paul Hobbs, Darren Mew
- Producer(s): Force & Styles, Steelworks Productions

Darren Styles singles chronology
"Paradise & Dreams" (1997)	"Heart of Gold" (1998)	"Black Magic" (2002)

"Heart of Gold" is a song written and recorded by Force & Styles. It was first recorded and released on Force & Styles album All over the UK (1996) with the vocals originally sung by popular hardcore vocalist Jenna Barr, and it was released as a single in 1998 with vocals by Kelly Llorenna. It is one of the most well known hardcore songs and was used as the name of Force & Styles's greatest hits album Heart of Gold. In 2002, Llorenna released a new version as her fourth solo single produced by Flip & Fill.

== Force & Styles version ==
The original version is a happy hardcore song with vocals by Jenna Barr. It was released as a one-sided 12-inch promo on United Dance Recordings; this is the version that appears on Force & Styles's first album, All over the UK, and their greatest hits album Heart of Gold (2000).

In 1998, the song was released as a single on Diverse records. The new versions had additional production by Eliot Kennedy of Steelworks Productions, as well as Mike Percy and Tim Lever from Dead or Alive to make the song more commercial. Force & Styles also produced a new version as well with vocals by Kelly Llorenna for the single.

=== Track listings ===
CD single (1998)

1. "Heart of Gold" (feat. Kelly Llorenna) – 4:23
2. "Heart of Gold" (Rated PG Premier mix) – 7:23
3. "Heart of Gold '98" (extended mix) (feat. Kelly Llorenna) – 7:45

12-inch single 1 (1998)

1. "Heart of Gold '98" (extended mix) (feat. Kelly Llorenna) – 7:45
2. "Heart of Gold" (original mix) (feat. Jenna Barr) – 7:59

12-inch single 2 (1998)

1. "Heart of Gold" (extended mix) (feat. Kelly Llorenna)
2. "Heart of Gold" (Ruff Driverz club mix)
3. "Heart of Gold" (Rated PG club mix)

=== Personnel ===
Force & Styles

- Paul Hobbs – producer
- Darren Mew – producer

Production

- Steelworks Productions (Eliot Kennedy, Mike Percy, Tim Lever) – producers (on 1998 single version)

Additional musicians

- Jenna Barr – vocals
- Kelly Llorenna – vocals (on 1998 single version)
- Colin Brett – guitar (on 1998 single version)

Other personnel

- Mark Yates – design

=== Charts ===
Chart (1998)	Peak position
Scotland (OCC)	39
UK Singles (OCC)	55
UK Dance (OCC)	4
UK Indie (OCC)	7

== Kelly Llorenna version ==
"Heart of Gold"

Single by Kelly Llorenna

from the album All Clubbed Up
- Released: 18 November 2002
- Length: 3:03
- Label: All Around the World
- Songwriter(s): Paul Hobbs, Darren Mew
- Producer(s): Flip & Fill

Kelly Llorenna singles chronology
"Tell It to My Heart" (2002)	"Heart of Gold" (2002)	"Forever" (2003)

Llorenna re-recorded and released "Heart of Gold" as her fourth solo single on 18 November 2002. It was produced by Flip & Fill and reached number 19 on the UK Singles Chart.

=== Track listings ===
CD single

1. "Heart of Gold" (radio edit) – 3:03
2. "Heart of Gold" (Flip & Fill remix) – 6:37
3. "Heart of Gold" (DJ Demand remix) – 6:47

12-inch single

1. "Heart of Gold" (Flip & Fill remix) – 6:37
2. "Heart of Gold" (Infextious remix) – 6:46
3. "Heart of Gold" (Hixxy's remix) – 6:42

=== Personnel ===
- Kelly Llorenna – vocals

Production

- Flip & Fill – producer
- Lee Monteverde – mixing

Other personnel

- Ignition – design

=== Charts ===
Chart (2002)	Peak position
Europe (Eurochart Hot 100)	68
Ireland Dance (IRMA)	8
Scotland (OCC)	12
UK Singles (OCC)	19
UK Dance (OCC)	12
