= Happy Hour (N-Trance album) =

Studio album by N-Trance
- Released: 23 February 1998
- Recorded: 1995–1998
- Genre: Euro-dance-pop
- Length: 52:53
- Label: All Around the World
- Producer: Curds & Whey

N-Trance chronology
| Electronic Pleasure (1995) | Happy Hour (1998) | The Best of N-Trance 1992–2002 (2001) |

U.S. Album Cover
- U.S. version of the album cover

Japan Album Cover
- Japanese version of the album cover

Singles from Happy Hour
- 1. "D.I.S.C.O." Released: 5 April 1997; 2. "The Mind of the Machine" Released: 23 August 1997; 3. "Da Ya Think I'm Sexy?" Released: 1 November 1997; 4. "Broken Dreams" Released: 9 March 1998; 5. "Paradise City" Released: 12 September 1998; 6. "Tears in the Rain" Released: 19 December 1998

Professional ratings
Review scores
| Source | Rating |
|---|---|
| AllMusic | link |

Happy Hour is the second full-length album released by British electronic dance music group N-Trance. It was released in the UK in May 1998 and the US on 25 May 1999.

== Track listing ==
All music is composed by N-Trance.

UK Track Listing
| No. | Title | Writer(s) | Length |
|---|---|---|---|
| 1. | "Da Ya Think I'm Sexy?" | Appice, Hutchings, Stewart | 4:19 |
| 2. | "Paradise City" | Adler, McKagan, Rose, Slash, Stradlin | 4:31 |
| 3. | "Tears in the Rain" | Longworth, O'Toole | 3:33 |
| 4. | "Broken Dreams" | George, Lang, Longworth, Lyte, O'Toole, Page | 4:10 |
| 5. | "Feel Good" | Longworth, Lyte, O'Toole | 4:07 |
| 6. | "D.I.S.C.O." | Kluger, Lyte, Vangarde | 4:24 |
| 7. | "Andare Con Me" | Longworth, O'Toole | 4:38 |
| 8. | "If" | O'Toole | 4:18 |
| 9. | "Superstition" | Wonder | 4:53 |
| 10. | "Amadeus" | Longworth, O'Toole | 5:09 |
| 11. | "The Mind of the Machine" | Longworth, O'Toole | 8:51 |

Australian Bonus Track
| No. | Title | Writer(s) | Length |
|---|---|---|---|
| 12. | "Stayin' Alive" (Live Version) | Gibb, Gibb, Gibb | 4:55 |

Canadian Bonus Track
| No. | Title | Writer(s) | Length |
|---|---|---|---|
| 12. | "Paradise City" (GYR-8 Remix) | Adler, McKagan, Rose, Slash, Stradlin | 4:09 |

U.S. Bonus Tracks
| No. | Title | Writer(s) | Length |
|---|---|---|---|
| 12. | "Stayin' Alive" | Gibb, Gibb, Gibb | 4:02 |
| 13. | "Set You Free" | Longworth, O'Toole | 3:31 |

Japanese Track Listing
| No. | Title | Writer(s) | Length |
|---|---|---|---|
| 1. | "Da Ya Think I'm Sexy?" | Appice, Hutchings, Stewart | 4:18 |
| 2. | "Tsunami: Tears in the Rain" | Longworth, O'Toole | 3:33 |
| 3. | "Andaré Con Mé" | Longworth, O'Toole | 4:36 |
| 4. | "Self Destruct" | Longworth, O'Toole | 4:26 |
| 5. | "Amadeus" | Longworth, O'Toole | 5:07 |
| 6. | "If" | O'Toole | 4:10 |
| 7. | "Superstition" | Wonder | 4:51 |
| 8. | "D.I.S.C.O." | Kluger, Lyte, Vangarde | 4:21 |
| 9. | "So High" | Longworth, O'Toole | 6:32 |
| 10. | "Take Me Home Tonight" | O'Toole | 5:24 |
| 11. | "2012" | O'Toole | 3:47 |
| 12. | "Stayin' Alive" | Gibb, Gibb, Gibb | 1:31 |
| 13. | "Set You Free" | Longworth, O'Toole | ?:?? |

== Personnel ==
- Nobby - Engineer
- Vinny Burns - Guitar
- Curds & Whey - Producer, Arranged By
- Ricardo da Force - Rap
- Jerome Stokes - Vocals
- Kelly Llorenna - Vocals
- Rod Stewart - Vocals
- Lee Limer - Vocals
- Gary Crowley - Vocals
- Viveen Wray - Vocals
- David Grant - Vocals
- Steven Berkoff - Vocals
- Colin McMillan - Remix

== Charts ==
Chart performance for Happy Hour
| Chart (1998) | Peak position |
|---|---|
| Australian Albums (ARIA) | 79 |
| New Zealand Albums (RMNZ) | 31 |

== Release history ==
| Country | Release date | Label | Catalog |
|---|---|---|---|
| United Kingdom | 23 February 1998 | All Around The World | GLOBECD8 |
| Germany | 9 October 1998 | Blow Up | INT 4845602 |
| Mexico | 1998 | Musart | ??? |
| Scandinavia | 1998 | Scandinavian Records | SRCD 54199 |
| Russia | 1998 | Soyuz | SZCD 0959-98 |
| Chile | 1998 | BMG | 1852 41547-2 |
| Australia | 1998 | Festival Records | D 93486 |
| Canada | 1998 | Polymedia | 740 126 2 |
| Japan | 19 January 1999 | Avex Trax | AVCD-11596 |
| United States | 25 May 1999 | Radikal Records | RAD90001 |
