= Stayin' Alive =

1977 single by the Bee Gees

- UK 7-inch vinyl single

Single by Bee Gees

from the album Saturday Night Fever
- B-side: "If I Can't Have You"
- Released: 15 December 1977
- Recorded: 1977
- Studio: Château d'Hérouville (France); Criteria (Miami)
- Genre: Disco
- Length: 4:45 (album version); 6:59 (12 inch version); 3:25 (single version)
- Label: RSO
- Songwriters: Barry Gibb; Robin Gibb; Maurice Gibb
- Producers: Bee Gees; Albhy Galuten; Karl Richardson

Bee Gees singles chronology
"How Deep Is Your Love" (1977)	"Stayin' Alive" (1977)	"Night Fever" (1978)

Music video
- "Stayin' Alive" on YouTube

"Stayin' Alive" is a song written and performed by the Bee Gees from the Saturday Night Fever motion picture soundtrack. The song was released in December 1977 by RSO Records as the second single from the Saturday Night Fever soundtrack. The band wrote the song and co-produced it with Albhy Galuten and Karl Richardson. It is one of the Bee Gees' signature songs. In 2004, "Stayin' Alive" was placed at No. 189 by Rolling Stone on their list of the 500 Greatest Songs of All Time. The 2021 updated Rolling Stone list of 500 Greatest Songs placed "Stayin' Alive" at No. 99. In 2004, it ranked No. 9 on AFI's 100 Years...100 Songs survey of top tunes in American cinema. In a UK television poll on ITV in December 2011 it was voted fifth in The Nation's Favourite Bee Gees Song.

On its release, "Stayin' Alive" climbed the charts to hit the number one spot on the US Billboard Hot 100 the week of 4 February 1978, remaining there for four consecutive weeks. Consequently, it became one of the band's most recognisable tunes, partly because it appeared in the opening credits of Saturday Night Fever. In the United States, it would become the second of the Bee Gees' six consecutive number-one singles, tying the record with the Beatles for most consecutive number-ones in the United States at the time (a record broken by Whitney Houston who achieved seven consecutive number-ones).

In 1979, at the 21st Annual Grammy Awards, "Stayin' Alive" won the award for Grammy Award for Best Vocal Arrangement for Two or More Voices, alongside 3 other wins at that ceremony, including Album of The Year.

== Writing and recording ==
The executive producer of the Saturday Night Fever motion picture soundtrack and Bee Gees manager Robert Stigwood asked the band to write a few songs for the soundtrack. At this point, the film was in early stages and it did not have a title; in fact, all Stigwood had to go on was a New York cover story about discomania.

They wrote "Stayin' Alive" over the course of a few days while sprawled on the staircase at the Château d'Hérouville studio near Paris. As with many other artists during the 1970s, the Bee Gees recorded most of the soundtrack in France for tax reasons.

RSO Records wanted the song to share the then-title of the film, "Saturday Night", but the Bee Gees refused a title change, insisting that there had been too many songs with "Saturday" in the title, and the album already had a song with the word "night" in the title—"Night Fever". "We'd also written a song called 'Saturday Night'", Maurice explains, "But there were so many songs called 'Saturday Night' even one by the Bay City Rollers, so when we rewrote it for the movie, we called it 'Stayin' Alive'." Rather than insist the Bee Gees change "Stayin' Alive" to match the film's original title, Stigwood renamed the movie from "Saturday Night" to "Saturday Night Fever," connecting it to their song "Night Fever" instead.

Robin Gibb recalls, "The subject matter of 'Stayin' Alive' is actually quite a serious one; It's about survival in the streets of New York, and the lyrics actually say that". Barry Gibb reflects, "Everybody struggles against the world, fighting all the bullshit and things that can drag you down. And it really is a victory just to survive. But when you climb back on top and win bigger than ever before, well that's something everybody reacts to. Everybody".

Over the years, the brothers have had mixed feelings about the song, admitting it brought them tremendous fame but conversely branded them as a disco act, despite a long and varied career before and after.

The track was finished at Criteria Studios, with Maurice Gibb laying down a bass line similar to the guitar riff, Barry Gibb and Alan Kendall on guitar riffs, and Blue Weaver adding synthesizers. The Boneroo Horns parts were added. Barry sings falsetto on the whole song, except on the line "life's going nowhere, somebody help me".

The band's drummer Dennis Bryon left the recording sessions early as his mother died. The shortage of qualified replacement drummers in the area prompted the group to try a drum machine, but it did not offer satisfactory results. After listening to the drum track of the already-recorded "Night Fever", the group and producer Albhy Galuten took two bars from that track, rerecorded them as a recurrent loop on a separate tape (creating the song's constant rhythm), and proceeded with sessions for "Stayin' Alive". The group jokingly listed the drummer as "Bernard Lupe" (a takeoff on session drummer Bernard Purdie). Lupe became a highly sought-after drummer until it was discovered that he did not exist.

Albhy Galuten talks about the recording of "Stayin' Alive":

Barry and I listened carefully to find a bar that felt really good. Everyone knows that it's more about feel than accuracy in drum tracks. We chose a bar that felt so good that we ended up using that same loop on 'Stayin' Alive,' and 'More Than a Woman,' and then again on Barbra Streisand's song 'Woman in Love.' To make the loop, we copied the drums onto one-quarter-inch tape. Karl spliced the tape and jerry rigged it so that it was going over a mic stand and around a plastic reel. At first, we were doing it just as a temporary measure. As we started to lay tracks down to it, we found that it felt really great—very insistent but not machinelike. It had a human feel. By the time we had overdubbed all the parts to the songs and Dennis came back, there was no way we could get rid of the loop.

In their work together, Gibb and Galuten had tried playing with a click track as Galuten explained:

While today's musicians know how to get a good groove with the click, back then, if you used a click track you rarely got a good feel. The loop crossed the boundary giving us music that was in time with a good feel. If I had been working for a technology company then and knew what I was doing, I would have tried to patent the idea. Nonetheless, it changed a lot of things. That first loop was a watershed event in our life and times.

== Release ==
The song was not initially scheduled for release, with "How Deep Is Your Love" selected as lead single, but fans called radio stations and RSO Records requesting the song immediately after seeing trailers for Saturday Night Fever, featuring the track over the aforementioned introductory scene. The single was eventually released in mid-December, a month after the album, and moved to the top of the Billboard Hot 100 in the United States in February, where it stayed for four weeks. Soon after, it slid to number two, near the third hit from the album, "Night Fever". In the United Kingdom, "Stayin' Alive" was not as popular as it was in the United States, but was still a hit, reaching number four.

Further demonstrating the Bee Gees' US chart domination in 1978, "Stayin' Alive" was replaced at number one with the group's younger brother Andy Gibb's single, "Love Is Thicker Than Water", followed by the Bee Gees' "Night Fever" for their longest run, eight weeks. This was then replaced by Yvonne Elliman's "If I Can't Have You". Barry Gibb had a hand in writing all four of these songs, becoming the only person in history to write four successive US number-one singles. Besides the version that appeared on the soundtrack album (4:43 in length) and the edited 45 rpm single for Top 40 radio release (3:29), there was yet another version, from the same recording session but of a slightly different mix, that was distributed on twelve-inch vinyl to club DJs and radio stations that specialised in airing longer versions of hit songs. This "Special Disco Version" featured all the same parts as the album version but had a horn rhythm section interjected twice. Although twelve-inch disco mixes were usually sped up, this version was slowed down slightly. It is the longest version of "Stayin' Alive" ever made, and faded at 6:59. It was finally released on CD in 2007 by Reprise on an expanded and remastered version of Bee Gees Greatest.

Initial plans were for Yvonne Elliman, then known for ballads, to record "How Deep Is Your Love" for Saturday Night Fever, while the Bee Gees produced their own version of the more disco-oriented "If I Can't Have You" for the film. Robert Stigwood thought he would prefer the songs from different genders and directed the group to cut the ballad, while Elliman cut "If I Can't Have You" with her usual producer Freddie Perren. Satisfied with this switch, Elliman's interpretation made the soundtrack, while the Bee Gees' version was relegated to the B-side of the "Stayin' Alive" single. The brothers' version has since appeared on CD in hits compilations.

George Martin commented about this song saying: "The great thing about 'Stayin' Alive' is that it had a great guitar hook to start with which set up the theme, that pulsating beat. It's no coincidence, by the way, that the disco beat of 120 [sic] beats per minute coincides the heartbeat of your heart when you're excited. This was a key thing which underlined the whole tune, and when the vocals came in, the vocals were so designed that they pushed that beat further".

== Critical reception ==
Billboard magazine reviewed the single, calling it one of the Bee Gees' best songs and an "almost irresistible dance tune." A reviewer from Cash Box said that it "combines catchy melodies, falsetto harmonies and a dancing beat in a package that will lead to big pop and R&B chart numbers." Record World called it "a pulsing, rather ominous dance tune."

AllMusic critic Donald A. Guarisco said that lyrics such as "Well you can tell by the way I use my walk/I'm a woman's man, no time to talk" "perfectly capture the macho swagger of the average late-'70s disco-loving young New York male," but this is balanced with lyrics that "hint at the hidden desperation of city life," such as "I'm goin' nowhere/somebody help me, yeah/I'm stayin' alive." With respect to the music, Guarisco noted that the song builds tension in the fast tempo of the verses, but releases tension when the fast paced refrain slows down "on the descending notes that underline the phrase "ah, ah, ah, stayin' alive." Guarisco concluded that it's "not only one of the Bee Gees' finest hits but also one of the all-time dance-pop classics."

== Music video ==
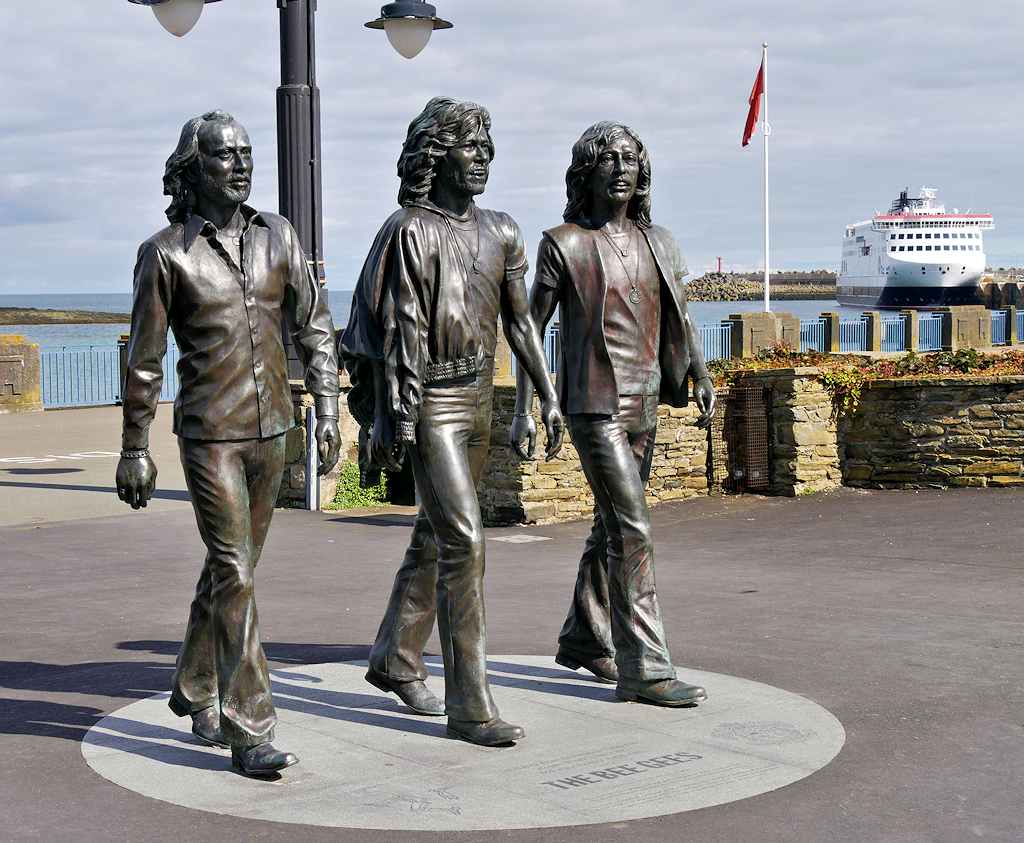
The statue of the Bee Gees in their birthplace of Douglas, Isle of Man was inspired by the video

The accompanying music video for the song is of an entirely different concept from Saturday Night Fever. Filmed on MGM Studios' backlot #2 in Culver City, California, while the group were simultaneously filming the movie Sgt. Pepper's Lonely Hearts Club Band on the lot, the video featured Quality Street (a set that was used for such films as The Three Musketeers and Young Frankenstein) as well as the Grand Central Station set used in the films The Band Wagon and the opening of That's Entertainment! with Fred Astaire. As the group walks past one of the railway cars in the video, the words "New York Central" can be seen printed on the side of the train above a passenger window. The MGM art directors added this bit of authenticity because the actual New York Central Railroad operated several lines from Grand Central Terminal in New York City during the 20th century until 1969. The British artist Andy Edwards was inspired by the music video when he sculpted the statue of the Bee Gees in their birthplace of Douglas on the Isle of Man which depicts the trio walking on the Douglas promenade, with Edwards stating, "they're walking in time, they're walking to a rhythm".

== Personnel ==
Credits.

- Barry Gibb – lead vocals, harmony vocals, rhythm guitar, acoustic guitar
- Robin Gibb – harmony vocals, background vocals
- Maurice Gibb – harmony vocals, background vocals, bass guitar
- Alan Kendall – lead guitar
- Blue Weaver – electric piano, string synth
- Bernard Lupe (Dennis Bryon) – drum loop
- Joe Lala – percussion

== Track listing ==
- "Stayin' Alive" – 3:29
- "If I Can't Have You" – 3:25
- "More Than A Woman" – 3:29
- "Night Fever" – 3:32

== 1989 reissue ==
- "Stayin' Alive" – 4:45
- "Subway" – 4:20
- "Love So Right" – 3:33

== Use in medical training ==
The correct rate of CPR is 100 to 120 chest compressions per minute, which aligns with the beat of this song.

"Stayin' Alive" is used to train people to provide the correct rate of chest compressions per minute while performing cardiopulmonary resuscitation (CPR). The song has around 103 beats per minute, and 100–120 chest compressions per minute are recommended for CPR. According to the BMJ, the song "doubles as a metronome for correct cardiac compression rate". Using the song has been found to improve memory retention for CPR skills during the months after training.

A study on canine CPR training for veterinarians found that using the Bee Gees' "Stayin' Alive" as an auditory aid helped participants maintain an accurate chest compression rate better than no auditory aid, but that Queen's "Another One Bites the Dust" or a traditional metronome was more effective.

The original idea has been attributed to Alson Inaba, a Hawaiian emergency medicine physician. The song was featured in an educational campaign by the American Heart Association, which included a video and a multi-city tour to promote CPR. The video featured actor and medical doctor Ken Jeong in the classic John Travolta outfit from Saturday Night Fever. Vinnie Jones starred in the British version of this CPR video in association with the British Heart Foundation shown on TV in January 2012. As any song with the correct tempo can be helpful, one hospital put together a Spotify playlist, including "Stayin' Alive" and dozens of other songs that have about 100 bpm.

The concept of using "Stayin' Alive" for CPR was parodied in the Season 5 episode of comedy series The Office "Stress Relief" and the song itself was used in a season 11 episode of the medical drama Grey's Anatomy in 2015. Misty Quigley from Yellowjackets also performs CPR to the beat of 'Stayin' Alive' on Crystal/Kristen in Season 2, episode 5, "Two Truths and a Lie," airing in 2023.

== Accolades ==
Year	Publisher	Country	Accolade	Rank
1981	Dave Marsh & James Bernard	United States	"Singles of the Year 1978"	1
1989	Dave Marsh	United States	"The 1001 Greatest Singles Ever Made"	716
1989	Rolling Stone	United States	"The 100 Best Singles of the Last 25 Years"	50
1995	Rock and Roll Hall of Fame	United States	"500 Songs that Shaped Rock and Roll"	*
2000	Rolling Stone	United States	"100 Greatest Pop Songs"	93
2000	VH1	United States	"100 Greatest Dance Songs"	10
2001	Recording Industry Association of America (RIAA)	United States	"Songs of the Century" (365)	94
2003	PopMatters	United States	"The 100 Best Songs Since Johnny Rotten Roared"	65
2003	Q	United Kingdom	"100 Songs that Changed the World"	17
2003	Q	United Kingdom	"The 1001 Best Songs Ever"	280
2004	Rolling Stone	United States	"The 500 Greatest Songs of All Time"	189
2004	AFI	United States	"AFI's 100 Years...100 Songs"	9
2009	VH1	United States	"100 Greatest Rock Songs"	54
2010	Rolling Stone	United States	"The 500 Greatest Songs of All Time"	191
2011	Robert Dimery	United Kingdom	"1001 Songs You Must Hear Before You Die"	*
2011	Time	United States	"All-TIME 100 Songs"	*
2012	Rolling Stone	United States	"The Best Disco Songs of All Time"	1
2021	Rolling Stone	United States	"The 500 Greatest Songs of All Time"	99
2022	Rolling Stone	United States	"200 Greatest Dance Songs of All Time"	129
2024	Forbes	United States	"The 30 Greatest Disco Songs of All Time"	6

(*) indicates the list is unordered.

== Charts ==
=== Weekly charts ===
Chart (1978)	Peak position
Australia (Kent Music Report)	1
Austria (Ö3 Austria Top 40)	2
Belgium (Ultratop 50 Flanders)	2
Canada Top Singles (RPM)	1
Canada Adult Contemporary (RPM)	2
Canada Dance/Urban (RPM)	13
Europe (Eurochart Hot 100)	1
Finland (Suomen virallinen lista)	2
France (IFOP)	2
Ireland (IRMA)	4
Italy (Musica e Dischi)	1
Japan (Oricon)	15
Mexico	1
Netherlands (Dutch Top 40)	1
Netherlands (Single Top 100)	3
New Zealand (Recorded Music NZ)	1
Norway (VG-lista)	4
Portugal (Musica & Som)	2
South Africa (Springbok Radio)	1
Spain (Promusicae)	2
Sweden (Sverigetopplistan)	3
Switzerland (Schweizer Hitparade)	2
UK Singles (Official Charts)	4
US Billboard Hot 100	1
US Adult Contemporary (Billboard)	28
US Dance Club Songs (Billboard)	3
US Hot Soul Singles (Billboard)	4
US Cash Box Top 100	1
US Record World Singles	1
West Germany (GfK)	2

Chart (1989)	Peak position
France (SNEP)	44

Chart (2012)	Peak position
France (SNEP)	62
Japan Hot 100 Singles	81

Chart (2014)	Peak position
France (SNEP)	165

Chart (2020)	Peak position
US Hot Dance/Electronic Songs (Billboard)	6

Chart (2024–2026)	Peak position
Global 200 (Billboard)	56
Greece International (IFPI)	32
Kazakhstan Airplay (TopHit)	92
Portugal (AFP)	108

=== Year-end charts ===
Chart (1978)	Position
Australia (Kent Music Report)	4
Austria (Ö3 Austria Top 40)	6
Belgium (Ultratop 50 Flanders)	6
Canada Top Singles (RPM)	9
Netherlands (Dutch Top 40)	6
Netherlands (Single Top 100)	7
South Africa (Springbok Radio)	4
Switzerland (Schweizer Hitparade)	5
US Billboard Hot 100	4
US Cash Box Top 100	2

Chart (2021)	Position
US Hot Dance/Electronic Songs (Billboard)	84

=== All-time charts ===
Chart (1958–2018)	Position
US Billboard Hot 100	59

== Certifications and sales ==
Region	Certification	Certified units/sales
Belgium	—	90,000
Brazil (Pro-Música Brasil)	Gold	30,000^{‡}
Canada (Music Canada)	Platinum	150,000^{^}
Denmark (IFPI Danmark)	Platinum	90,000^{‡}
France (SNEP)	Gold	500,000^{*}
Germany (BVMI)	Platinum	600,000^{‡}
Italy (FIMI)	2× Platinum	200,000^{‡}
New Zealand (RMNZ)	5× Platinum	150,000^{‡}
Portugal (AFP)	2× Platinum	50,000^{‡}
Spain (Promusicae)	2× Platinum	120,000^{‡}
United Kingdom (BPI) 1978 sales	Silver	800,000
United Kingdom (BPI) 2008 release	3× Platinum	1,800,000^{‡}
United States (RIAA)	Platinum	3,900,000
Streaming
Greece (IFPI Greece)	2× Platinum	4,000,000^{†}
^{*} Sales figures based on certification alone.^{^} Shipments figures based on certification alone.^{‡} Sales+streaming figures based on certification alone.^{†} Streaming-only figures based on certification alone.

== N-Trance version ==
"Stayin' Alive"

Single by N-Trance featuring Ricardo da Force

from the album Electronic Pleasure
- Released: 4 September 1995
- Studio: Marcus
- Genre: Hip-hop; disco
- Length: 4:05
- Label: All Around the World
- Songwriters: Barry Gibb; Robin Gibb; Maurice Gibb; Dale Longworth; Kevin O'Toole; Ricardo Lyte
- Producers: Dale Longworth; Kevin O'Toole

N-Trance singles chronology
"Set You Free" (1995)	"Stayin' Alive" (1995)	"Electronic Pleasure" (1996)

Music video
- "Stayin' Alive" on YouTube

In 1995, British electronic music group N-Trance recorded a dance version of "Stayin' Alive", with new lyrics and rapping by Ricardo da Force. This cover was released in September 1995 by All Around the World Productions as the third single from the group's debut album, Electronic Pleasure (1995). It reached number one on Australia's ARIA Singles Chart and Canada's RPM Dance/Urban chart. The song was also a major hit in Europe, reaching number two in Finland, Iceland, Italy, Switzerland, and the United Kingdom, and peaking within the top five in several other countries. On the Eurochart Hot 100, "Stayin' Alive" peaked at number three. The accompanying music video was directed by Alex De Rakoff, featuring the group performing at a disco.

=== Chart performance ===
N-Trance's cover of "Stayin' Alive" peaked at number one in Australia and on two Canadian charts: the RPM Dance chart and The Record's singles chart. In Europe, it peaked at number one in Scotland and reached number two in Finland, Iceland, Italy, Switzerland, and the United Kingdom. In the UK, the single peaked during its first week on the UK Singles Chart, on 10 September 1995. It also reached number one on the RM UK Pop Tip Club Chart. It additionally entered the top 10 in Austria, Belgium, Denmark, France, Germany, Ireland, Norway, Spain, and Sweden, as well as on the Eurochart Hot 100, where it rose to number three.

Outside Europe, "Stayin' Alive" went to number three in New Zealand, number nine on the Billboard Maxi-Singles Sales chart in the United States, number 56 on the RPM 100 Hit Tracks chart in Canada, and number 62 on the Billboard Hot 100. The single earned a gold record in France and Germany, a silver record in the UK, a platinum record in New Zealand, and a double-platinum record in Australia.

=== Critical reception ===
Larry Flick from Billboard magazine wrote, "U.K. import enthusiasts are already aware of this jumpy rap interpretation of the Bee Gees disco classic. Early radio reaction holds promise for a quick and successful ride up the Hot 100. There is not a whole lot of substance in TLK's rap [sic], but he certainly has a rousing, infectious style that makes the track spark. Singer Kelly Llorenna injects some bright diva flash during the bridge and chorus." Writing for Dotmusic, James Masterton stated that N-Trance "take the song into a whole new dimension". He added, "This is no ordinary cover, this is a fantastic reinterpretation that only the bold would bet against being Number One next week."

Ross Jones from The Guardian complimented the group's "knack for ingenious disco updates". A reviewer from Music Week gave the song three out of five, saying that rapper da Force "takes the mic for this radical reworking of the Bee Gees classic which isn't Euro enough to grab the same audience as their recent international hit 'Set You Free'". James Hamilton from the Record Mirror Dance Update described the N-Trance cover as a "jiggly rolling 0–106.4bpm chugger" in his weekly dance column.

=== Music video ===
A humoristic music video was made for "Stayin' Alive", directed by British director Alex De Rakoff and produced by Spidercom Films. It features N-Trance performing the song at a 1970s disco. The video was A-listed on Dutch music television channel TMF and was a Box Top on British The Box for six weeks in October 1995. The following month, it was A-listed on Germany's VIVA and received active rotation on MTV Europe.

=== Track listing ===
CD single, UK (1995)
No.	Title	Length
1.	"Stayin' Alive" (Radio Version)	4:05
2.	"I Will Take You There"	3:59
3.	"Turn Up The Power" (Dark Mix)	5:06
4.	"Stayin' Alive" (Extended Mix)	6:05

CD maxi, US (1995)
No.	Title	Length
1.	"Stayin' Alive" (Radio Version)	4:05
2.	"Stayin' Alive" (Extended Mix)	6:04
3.	"Set U Free" (Pop Mix)	4:06
4.	"Set U Free" (Nymphomaniac)	5:14

=== Charts ===
==== Weekly charts ====
Chart (1995–1996)	Peak position
Australia (ARIA)	1
Austria (Ö3 Austria Top 40)	5
Belgium (Ultratop 50 Flanders)	8
Belgium (Ultratop 50 Wallonia)	6
Canada Retail Singles (The Record)	1
Canada Top Singles (RPM)	56
Canada Dance/Urban (RPM)	1
Denmark (IFPI)	3
Europe (Eurochart Hot 100)	3
Europe (European Dance Radio)	2
Europe (European Hit Radio)	10
Finland (Suomen virallinen lista)	2
France (SNEP)	4
Germany (GfK)	3
Iceland (Íslenski Listinn Topp 40)	2
Ireland (IRMA)	4
Israel (Israeli Singles Chart)	4
Italy (Musica e dischi)	2
Netherlands (Dutch Top 40)	16
Netherlands (Single Top 100)	12
New Zealand (Recorded Music NZ)	3
Norway (VG-lista)	4
Quebec (ADISQ)	14
Scottish Singles Sales (Official Charts)	1
Spain (AFYVE)	3
Sweden (Sverigetopplistan)	5
Switzerland (Schweizer Hitparade)	2
UK Singles (Official Charts)	2
UK Dance (Official Charts)	4
UK Airplay (Music Week)	15
UK Pop Tip Club Chart (Music Week)	1
US Billboard Hot 100	62
US Maxi-Singles Sales (Billboard)	9
US Top 40/Rhythm-Crossover (Billboard)	28
US Cash Box Top 100	54

==== Year-end charts ====
Chart (1995)	Position
Australia (ARIA)	2
Belgium (Ultratop 50 Flanders)	55
Belgium (Ultratop 50 Wallonia)	43
Canada Dance/Urban (RPM)	26
Europe (Eurochart Hot 100)	9
Europe (European Dance Radio)	5
France (SNEP)	29
Germany (Media Control)	51
Iceland (Íslenski Listinn Topp 40)	37
Latvia (Latvijas Top 50)	146
Netherlands (Dutch Top 40)	130
Netherlands (Single Top 100)	99
New Zealand (RIANZ)	9
Sweden (Topplistan)	33
Switzerland (Schweizer Hitparade)	43
UK Singles (OCC)	34
UK Pop Tip Club Chart (Music Week)	25

Chart (1996)	Position
Canada Dance/Urban (RPM)	49

==== Decade-end charts ====
Decade-end chart performance for "Stayin' Alive"
Chart (1990–1999)	Position
Canada (Nielsen SoundScan)	15

=== Certifications ===
Region	Certification	Certified units/sales
Australia (ARIA)	2× Platinum	140,000^{^}
France (SNEP)	Gold	250,000^{*}
Germany (BVMI)	Gold	250,000^{^}
New Zealand (RMNZ)	Platinum	10,000^{*}
United Kingdom (BPI)	Silver	200,000^{^}
^{*} Sales figures based on certification alone.^{^} Shipments figures based on certification alone.

=== Release history ===
Region	Date	Format(s)	Label(s)	Ref.
United Kingdom	4 September 1995	12-inch vinyl; CD; cassette	All Around the World	
Australia	11 September 1995	CD; cassette	Festival; All Around the World	
Japan	21 December 1995	CD	Avex Trax	

== "Stayin' Alive" (Serban mix) ==
"Stayin' Alive (Serban mix)"

Single by Bee Gees
- Released: 10 February 2017
- Length: 4:57
- Label: Capitol
- Songwriters: Barry Gibb; Robin Gibb; Maurice Gibb
- Producer: Bee Gees

Bee Gees singles chronology
"If I Can't Have You (The Disco Boys remixes)" (2007)	"Stayin' Alive (Serban mix)" (2017)	"More Than a Woman (SG's Paradise remix)" (2021)

Audio
- "Stayin' Alive" (Serban mix) on YouTube

On 10 February 2017, Capitol Records released a new version of the song entitled "Stayin' Alive (Serban mix)". The song was mixed by Șerban Ghenea from "hi-resolution audio files" from the original recording session of "Stayin' Alive", and it was mastered by Tom Coyne. The single was released to mark the 40th anniversary of the Saturday Night Fever (1977) soundtrack.

=== Track listing ===
- Digital download
1. "Stayin' Alive" (Serban mix) – 4:57

== Other media ==
Cornell Dupree covered "Stayin' Alive" in 1977. Greek singer Bessy Argyraki released a Greek language version of the song called "Pio Dynata" in the 1970s.

The song is used in the 1980 comedy film Airplane!. During a bar-room fight, the song accidentally starts playing on a jukebox, turning the scene into a parody of Saturday Night Fever. Zucker, Abrahams and Zucker sped the track up by 10% in the film, and had to get permission from the Gibb brothers to do so.

In 2019, a cover was performed by Lizzo was released as a stand-alone promotional single for the movie Happy Death Day 2U. The song plays throughout the first set of end credits before the post-credit scene.

In 2010, Kingsley and Perdomo released a country version of the song with a prominent banjo part playing the riff. It is featured on their album "Fake Smiles".

In the BBC show Sherlock, it is a ringtone of Jim Moriarty, in its series two premiere on New Year's Day, 2012. It is also heard in the series two finale, when Moriarty tells Sherlock that their final problem is 'Stayin' Alive', whilst playing the song on his phone.

A Japanese language cover version by Avu-chan appeared on the soundtrack to the 2022 film, Bullet Train.

== See also ==
- List of number-one singles in Australia during the 1970s
- List of Billboard Hot 100 number-one singles of 1978
- List of Cash Box Top 100 number-one singles of 1978
- List of Dutch Top 40 number-one singles of 1978
- List of European number-one hits of 1978
- List of number-one hits of 1978 (Italy)
- List of number-one singles of 1978 (Canada)
- List of number-one singles of 1978 (France)
- List of number-one hits of 1978 (Mexico)
- List of number-one singles in 1978 (New Zealand)
- Rolling Stone's 500 Greatest Songs of All Time
- Statue of Bee Gees (Douglas, Isle of Man), inspired by the song's music video
