= Captain Jeff =

Oleg Georgievich Belobrov
- Also known as: Captain Jeff
- Born: Олег Георгиевич Белобров; 8 May 1974; Rudnogorsk, Nizhneilimsky District, Irkutsk Oblast, RSFSR, Soviet Union
- Genres: Eurodance, Happy hardcore
- Occupation: singer
- Years active: 1994 – 2001; 2021 – present

Oleg Georgievich Belobrov (Russian: Олег Георгиевич Белобров) is a Russian musician, who is known by the stage name Captain Jeff (Russian: Капитан Джефф) or CJEFF.

== Biography ==
Oleg Georgievich Belobrov was born on 8 May 1974, in Rudnogorsk, where he graduated from the local high school. He also graduated from a music college, specializing in opera vocals. In 1994, he moved to Moscow to launch his professional music career.

He signed a contract with producer Igor Siliverstov, presenting himself with a fully developed stage persona, musical material, and several songs, he had written himself. The project was named Captain Jeff.

The project's first release was the song "Неземной" ("Unearthly"), which came out in 1994 and called for dancing "unearthly" dances. Several new songs were released in 1995: "Я тебя так люблю" ("I Love You So Much"), which told the story of a beach romance, "Сигналы SOS" ("SOS Signals"), which sang of wounded human hearts everywhere crying out for love, "Эпидемия любви" ("The Epidemic Of Love"), which recounted a love virus that infected the entire planet, and "Компьютер-девочка" ("The Computer Girl"), centered on the development of artificial intelligence technology to a point where it became possible to form parasocial relationships, including erotic elements, between AI and humans. All the musical tracks were prime examples of the Eurodance of that era, with the exception of "Я тебя так люблю" ("I Love You So Much"), which was in the dream-house style.

The year 1997 added the following works to the singer's repertoire: "Ай-ай-ай" ("Ay-ay-ay"), dedicated to environmental issues, "Станция "Союз"" (""Union" Station"), which focused on a dance station in space, "Параллельный мир" ("The Parallel World"), telling of a journey to other worlds, "Мой код — Любовь" ("My Code Is Love"), recounting the anguish of separation from a loved one experienced by a deep-space explorer, and "Терминатор любви" ("The Terminator Of Love"), expressing fears about the disappearance of human love due to total robotization. While the second and the third songs on this list adhered to Eurodance conventions, the sound of the first and the fifth ones evolved towards Euro-rave, and the fourth one fell into the progressive trance genre. Additionally, 1997 saw the release of a second version of the song "Эпидемия любви" ("The Epidemic Of Love"), which sounded more like Euro-rave.

In 1998, Captain Jeff performed a concert on Red Square on Moscow City Day. In December of that year, a videoclip was released for the song "Первый уровень" ("First Level"), which became an unofficial anthem for gamers and the pinnacle of Russian pop-cosmism. This work incorporated music from the instrumental composition "Coldwater Canyon", featured on the album "Wicked!" by the German group Scooter. The videoclip was in rotation on the TV channel Muz-TV for two months and was also featured on the MTV Russia program "12 Angry Viewers". This song belonged to the happy hardcore genre.

In 1999, several more songs were released: "Супергерой" ("The Superhero"), which told of a battle against alien invaders, "Мужская дружба" ("Male Friendship"), whose title comprehensively described its subject matter, and the philosophical parable "Всё объединяет любовь" ("Love Unites Everything"). The first two tracks fell into the hard trance genre, while the last one was closer to progressive trance in terms of sound.

In 2000, the song "Скорость" ("Speed"), focused on a racing theme, was released. It was in the hard rave style.

After the expiration of his contract with the producer, Oleg Belobrov continued touring for a time under his original stage name, but decided to end his music career in 2001, having managed to release the ballad "Зачем же ты ушла" ("Why Have You Left"), which expressed his personal disillusionment with life, before doing so. He held various jobs in Moscow, including a position as head of the visa department at a travel agency, before returning to Siberia to work in the timber industry in Ust-Ilimsk.

In 2021, he resumed his music career amid renewed interest in his work from a new generation of listeners who had discovered his music video for the song "Первый уровень" ("First Level") on YouTube.

== Discography ==
- CJEFF — The Best Of Captain Jeff (2023)

== Videoclips ==
- Captain Jeff — Первый уровень (1998)
