= Paradise City =

1988 single by Guns N' Roses

- Artwork for US and Australian vinyl editions

Single by Guns N' Roses

from the album Appetite for Destruction
- B-side: "Move to the City"
- Released: November 30, 1988
- Genre: Glam metal; hard rock; heavy metal
- Length: 6:48 (album version); 5:20 (WLS-AM radio edit)
- Label: Geffen
- Songwriters: Slash; Axl Rose; Izzy Stradlin; Duff McKagan; Steven Adler
- Producer: Mike Clink

Guns N' Roses singles chronology
"Sweet Child o' Mine" (1988)	"Paradise City" (1988)	"Patience" (1989)

Music video
- Paradise City on YouTube

"Paradise City" is a song by the American rock band Guns N' Roses, featured on their debut album, Appetite for Destruction (1987). Released as a single in November 1988, it is the only song on the album to feature a synthesizer. The song peaked at number five on the Billboard Hot 100—becoming the band's third single to reach the top 10—and number six on the UK Singles Chart. It also topped the Irish Singles Chart, their first of three singles to do so.

== Background ==
Guns N' Roses' lead guitarist, Slash, states that the song was written in the back of a rental van as they were on their way back from playing a gig in San Francisco with the band Rock N Riders. He says that the band was drinking and playing acoustic guitars, when he came up with the intro. Duff McKagan and Izzy Stradlin started playing along. Slash started humming a melody when Axl Rose sang, "Take me down to the Paradise City." Slash chimed in with "Where the grass is green and the girls are pretty." Rose sang the first line again, where Slash shouted out "Where the girls are fat and they've got big titties." Rose finished with "Take ... me ... home!" Slash preferred his second line but the rest of the band felt differently. He was outvoted and they used the first line. The band then expanded upon the rest of the lyrics in rounds. Finally, Slash wrapped up by coming up with the heavy riff that drives the song.

During a 1988 interview, Rose told Hit Parader magazine that "the verses are more about being in the jungle; the chorus is like being back in the Midwest or somewhere."

In the last two minutes of the song, it changes to double-time and the chorus is repeated several times while Slash plays a guitar solo in the background.

Guitarist Andy McCoy has said that the song is copied from several riffs written by his band, Hanoi Rocks. He has said that the chorus is just a slower version of the riff in "Lost in the City". Axl Rose has often cited Hanoi Rocks as Guns N' Roses' biggest influence. Hanoi Rocks' original rhythm guitarist Nasty Suicide can also be seen in the music video for "Paradise City". The style of the main riff of "Paradise City" (involving an ascending chromatic riff) has also been used by many former Guns N' Roses members in new projects. This can be seen in Izzy Stradlin's "Bomb" and Velvet Revolver's "Do It for the Kids". According to Tracii Guns of L.A. Guns and former member of Guns N' Roses, the riff was influenced by the Black Sabbath song "Zero the Hero" from the Born Again album.

Musically, the song has been described as glam metal, hard rock, and heavy metal.

== Legacy ==
The song ranked number 21 on VH1's 40 Greatest Metal Songs of All Time. It ranked number 459 on Rolling Stone's 2010 list of "The 500 Greatest Songs of All Time." Some publications, such as Ultimate Classic Rock and Spin, have identified the song as one of the band's worst. The latter designating it as the most overrated in their catalogue, writing "'Paradise City' runs out of ideas halfway through its triumphant first refrain and yet still lasts for six more minutes." In 2017, Paste ranked the song number 11 on their list of the 15 greatest Guns N' Roses songs, and in 2020, Kerrang ranked the song number two on their list of the 20 greatest Guns N' Roses songs. The 2008 video game Burnout Paradise is set in a fictional location, known as Paradise City, which is named after the song, and the song itself serves as the game's theme song.

== Live ==
During live Guns N' Roses shows, "Paradise City" is usually performed last, as an encore. This has been a tradition since at least 1988, up to their latest tour. They also performed the song live at the Freddie Mercury tribute concert in 1992 (this time it was the first song of their short set).

== Track listings ==
All tracks are written by Guns N' Roses except where noted.

US 7-inch vinyl
No.	Title	Writer(s)	Length
1.	"Paradise City" (LP version)
2.	"Move to the City" (LP version)	Guns N' Roses, Del James, Chris Weber

UK 7-inch vinyl (GEF 50)
No.	Title	Length
1.	"Paradise City" (LP version)
2.	"Used to Love Her" (LP version)

UK 12-inch vinyl (GEF 50T)
No.	Title	Writer(s)	Length
1.	"Paradise City" (LP version)
2.	"Used to Love Her" (LP version)
3.	"Anything Goes" (LP Version)	Guns N' Roses, Weber

UK 3-inch CD (GEF 50CD)
No.	Title	Writer(s)	Length
1.	"Paradise City" (LP version)
2.	"Used to Love Her" (LP version)
3.	"Anything Goes" (LP version)	Guns N' Roses, Weber
4.	"Sweet Child O' Mine" (LP version)

== Personnel ==
- W. Axl Rose – lead vocals, backing vocals, synthesizer
- Slash – lead guitar
- Izzy Stradlin – rhythm guitar, backing vocals
- Duff "Rose" McKagan – bass guitar, backing vocals
- Steven Adler – drums

== Charts ==
=== Weekly charts ===
Chart (1989)	Peak position
Australia (ARIA)	48
Belgium (Ultratop 50 Flanders)	10
Canada Top Singles (RPM)	19
Europe (Eurochart Hot 100)	19
Finland (Suomen virallinen lista)	6
Ireland (IRMA)	1
Netherlands (Dutch Top 40)	4
Netherlands (Single Top 100)	2
New Zealand (Recorded Music NZ)	2
Norway (VG-lista)	4
Sweden (Sverigetopplistan)	3
Switzerland (Schweizer Hitparade)	7
UK Singles (Official Charts)	6
US Billboard Hot 100	5
US Mainstream Rock (Billboard)	14

Chart (2023)	Peak position
Hungary (Single Top 40)	21

=== Year-end charts ===
Chart (1989)	Position
Belgium (Ultratop)	47
Netherlands (Dutch Top 40)	33
Netherlands (Single Top 100)	21
New Zealand (RIANZ)	25
UK Singles (OCC)	96
US Billboard Hot 100	86

== Certifications ==
Region	Certification	Certified units/sales
Brazil (Pro-Música Brasil)	Platinum	60,000^{‡}
Denmark (IFPI Danmark)	Platinum	90,000^{‡}
Germany (BVMI)	Platinum	600,000^{‡}
Italy (FIMI)	Platinum	50,000^{‡}
New Zealand (RMNZ)	5× Platinum	150,000^{‡}
United Kingdom (BPI)	3× Platinum	1,800,000^{‡}
^{‡} Sales+streaming figures based on certification alone.

== Release history ==
Region	Date	Format(s)	Label(s)	Ref.
Europe	November 30, 1988	7-inch vinyl	Geffen	
United Kingdom	March 6, 1989	7-inch vinyl; 12-inch vinyl; CD	Geffen	

== N-Trance version ==
"Paradise City"

Single by N-Trance

from the album Happy Hour
- B-side: "Da Ya Think I'm Sexy?" (remix)
- Released: 1998
- Length: 4:31
- Label: All Around the World
- Songwriters: Slash; Axl Rose; Izzy Stradlin; Duff McKagan; Steven Adler; N-Trance
- Producer: N-Trance

N-Trance singles chronology
"Da Ya Think I'm Sexy?" (1997)	"Paradise City" (1998)	"Tears in the Rain" (1998)

Audio
- "Paradise City" on YouTube

British electronic music group N-Trance recorded a version of "Paradise City" (using the song's riff) for their 1998 album, Happy Hour. It was released as the album's fourth single in 1998. In the United Kingdom, it was the group's first single to miss the top 20 since "Turn Up the Power" in 1994, peaking at number 28 in September 1998. It reached the top 40 in Australia and Sweden—the group's final single to do so in these regions—and peaked at number four in New Zealand, where it charted for nine weeks.

=== Track listing ===
US maxi-CD (RAD 99012-2)
No.	Title	Length
1.	"Paradise City" (radio edit)	4:32
2.	"Paradise City" (Jerkwork remix)	6:23
3.	"Paradise City" (extended version)	6:34
4.	"Da Ya Think I'm Sexy?" (Direct Hit dance remix)	5:55

=== Charts ===
Chart (1998)	Peak position
Australia (ARIA)	35
Europe (Eurochart Hot 100)	90
New Zealand (Recorded Music NZ)	4
Scottish Singles Sales (Official Charts)	21
Sweden (Sverigetopplistan)	40
UK Singles (Official Charts)	28
UK Indie (Official Charts)	4

== See also ==
- List of glam metal albums and songs
