= Electronic Pleasure =

Studio album by N-Trance
- Released: November 1995
- Recorded: 1992–1995
- Studios: Marcus Studios, London; Out of the Blue, Manchester
- Genres: Rave; Eurotechno; pop
- Length: 52:50
- Label: All Around the World
- Producer: N-Trance

N-Trance chronology
Electronic Pleasure (1995)	Happy Hour (1998)

Singles from Electronic Pleasure
- 1. "Set You Free" Released: 4 October 1993; 2. "Turn Up the Power" Released: 22 October 1994; 3. "Stayin' Alive" Released: 4 September 1995; 4. "Electronic Pleasure" Released: 24 February 1996; 5. "(Just) Let It Go" Released: 1996 (Italy)

Electronic Pleasure is the first full-length studio album released by British electronic music group N-Trance. It was released in November 1995 and in the US in 1996.

== Critical reception ==
Professional ratings
Review scores
Source	Rating
AllMusic	3/5 stars
Smash Hits	4/5 stars

Music & Media wrote, "The album of this group, based around Kevin O' Toole and Dale Longworth, consists mostly of high-tempo techno, although some tracks have swingbeat, jungle, ragga and hip-hop influences. "Gimme 1 2 3 4 5" is one of those groovy mixtures, in which the rhythm around Ricardo Da Force' (KLF) and Jerome Stokes' rapping is much looser. "I Don't Wanna Lose Your Love...Again" is a touching ballad with a warm sax solo." British magazine Music Week noted, "A mixes collection of dance styles, ranging from electro-pop to solid soul. It includes their two hits and a half dozen other tracks which could spin off as successful singles."

== Track listing ==
All music is composed by N-Trance.

UK track listing
No.	Title	Writer(s)	Length
1.	"What Is Your Pleasure?"	O'Toole/Longworth/Lyte	1:48
2.	"Electronic Pleasure"	O'Toole/Longworth/Lyte	3:51
3.	"Stayin' Alive"	Gibb/Gibb/Gibb/O'Toole/Longworth/Lyte	4:04
4.	"I Will Take You There"	O'Toole	3:58
5.	"(Just) Let It Go"	O'Toole/Longworth/Lyte	4:17
6.	"Set You Free"	N-Trance	7:16
7.	"Softly (Dragging Me Down)"	O'Toole	5:00
8.	"Do You Wanna Rock?"	O'Toole/Longworth	3:57
9.	"Gimme 1 2 3 4 5"	O'Toole/Longworth/Lyte/Stokes	4:17
10.	"Turn Up the Power"	O'Toole/Longworth	3:55
11.	"I Don't Wanna Lose Your Love...Again"	O'Toole	4:08
12.	"That's All We Need"	O'Toole/Longworth/Lyte	4:11
Total length:			52:50

Japan bonus tracks
No.	Title	Length
13.	"Set You Free" (Nymphomania Mix)	5:14
14.	"Turn Up the Power" (Dream Frequency Remix)	4:58
15.	"Stayin' Alive" (long version)	6:06

US track listing
No.	Title	Length
1.	"What Is Your Pleasure?"	1:48
2.	"Electronic Pleasure"	3:51
3.	"Stayin' Alive"	4:04
4.	"I Will Take You There"	3:58
5.	"(Just) Let It Go"	4:17
6.	"Set You Free"	7:16
7.	"Softly (Dragging Me Down)"	5:00
8.	"Do You Wanna Rock?"	3:57
9.	"Gimme 1 2 3 4 5"	4:17
10.	"I Don't Wanna Lose Your Love...Again"	4:08
11.	"That's All We Need"	4:11
12.	"Turn Up the Power"	3:55
Total length:		52:50

UK LP track listing
No.	Title	Side	Length
1.	"What Is Your Pleasure?"	A	1:48
2.	"Electronic Pleasure"	A	3:51
3.	"Stayin' Alive"	A	4:04
4.	"I Will Take You There"	A	3:58
5.	"(Just) Let It Go"	A	4:17
6.	"Set You Free"	A	7:16
7.	"Softly (Dragging Me Down)"	B	5:00
8.	"Do You Wanna Rock?"	B	3:57
9.	"Gimme 1 2 3 4 5"	B	4:17
10.	"I Don't Wanna Lose Your Love...Again"	B	4:08
11.	"That's All We Need"	B	4:11
12.	"Stayin' Alive" (long version)	B	6:03

== Personnel ==
N-Trance

- Kevin O'Toole and Dale Longworth: Producer
- Ricardo da Force: Rap
- Kelly Llorenna: Vocals
- Jerome Stokes: Vocals
- Gillian Wisdom: Vocals
- Rachel McFarlane: Vocals
- T-1K: Rap

Other musicians

- David Grant & Choir: Backing Vocals
- Snake Davis: Saxophone
- Vinny Burns: Guitar
- Bee Gees: Backing Track
- Martin Ansell & Sandy McLelland: Vocals
- Lee Limer: Dancin'

Engineers

- Nobby: Engineer
- Timothy Russell: Engineer
- Adam Lesser: Engineer
- Richie Rich: Assistant Engineer

== Charts ==
Chart performance for Electronic Pleasure
Chart (1995–1996)	Peak position
Australian Albums (ARIA)	65
Finnish Albums (Suomen virallinen lista)	31
UK Albums (Official Charts)	99

== Release history ==
Country	Release date	Label	Catalog
United Kingdom	1995	All Around the World	GLOBECD2
Germany	1995	Blow Up Records	INT 845.589
Netherlands	1995	Royal Records	200 25 34
Australia	1995	Festival Records	RMD 53448
Argentina	1995	BMG	ECD 81.172
Spain	1995	CNR Music	4900122
US	1996	Critique	01624 15450-2
Japan	1996	Avex Trax	AVCD-11399
Canada	1997	Popular Records	PR2 3001
