= Rudnogorsk =

Rudnogorsk Рудногорск
- Urban-type settlement
- Interactive map of Rudnogorsk
- Location of Rudnogorsk Rudnogorsk (Irkutsk Oblast)
- Coordinates: 57.2685°N 103.7508°E
- Country: Russia
- Federal subject: Irkutsk Oblast
- Administrative district: Nizhneilimsky District
- Elevation: 452 m (1,483 ft)

Population (2010 Census)
  - Total: 3,620
  - Estimate (2025): 2,462 (−32%)
- Time zone: UTC+8 (MSK+5)
- Postal code: 665689
- OKTMO ID: 25626163051

Rudnogorsk (Russian: Рудногорск) is an urban locality (an urban-type settlement) in Nizhneilimsky District of Irkutsk Oblast, Russia. Population: 3,620 (2010 census); 4,559 (2002 census); 3,029 (1989 Soviet census).
