= Soundstream (band) =

Ukrainian band

SOUNDSTREAM
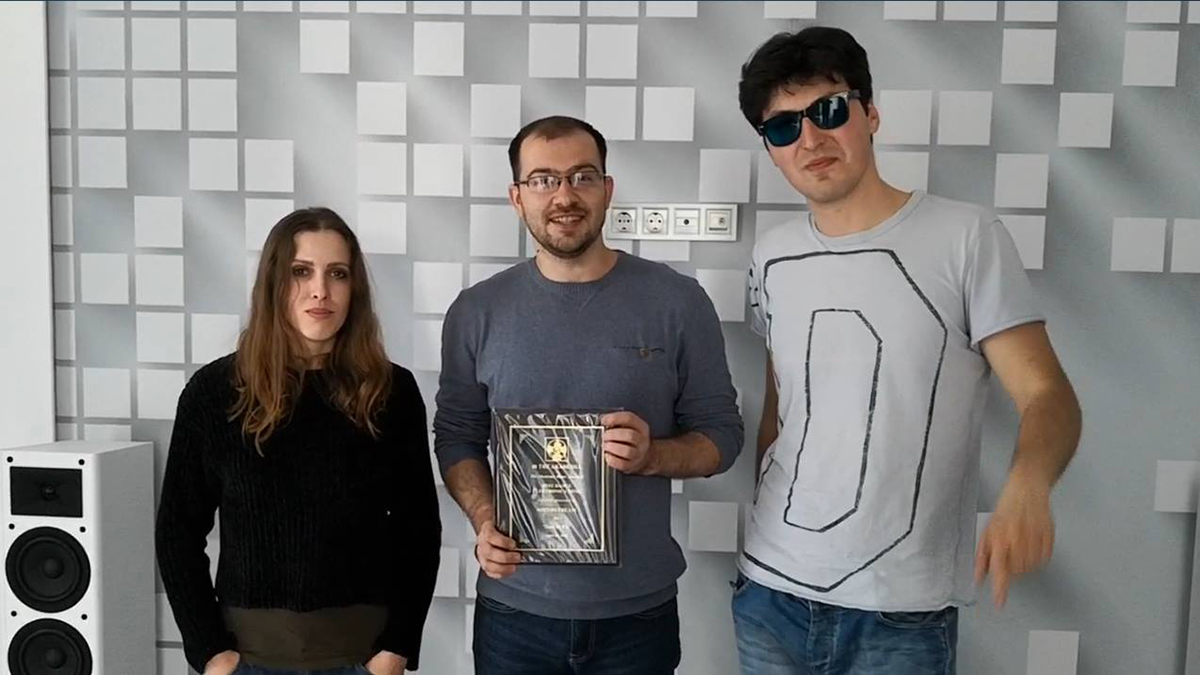
- Soundstream, 2019

Background information
- Origin: Kyiv, Ukraine
- Genres: Hands Up; Eurodance; Trance; Electro-House; Dubstep; EDM
- Years active: 2008–present
- Labels: (Germany) DMN Records (United Kingdom) LoVE IT Records (Ukraine) VG Star
- Members: Ann Pazyura; Sergey Podolsky; Denis Timish (DJ FatCat)
- Past members: Darya Bezkorovayna; Alexander Bulanov (Bulya); Yuriy Muktarov (DJ Spacedreamer)

Soundstream is a hands up/Eurodance music band founded in Kyiv, Ukraine. Currently, it consists of Ann Pazyura, Sergey Podolsky and DJ FatCat.

Among their well-known songs are "Feels Like Heaven", "See Me Now", "Could I Feel This Way Forever", "One More Time", "Music Takes Control", "We Got The Sound" and others.

== History ==
=== Beginnings ===
In 2008, DJ FatCat (Denis Timish) and Bulya (Alexander Bulanov), both students of Kyiv Polytechnic Institute at the time, decided to create a music band. They recorded their first song entitled "Feels Like Heaven" on September 17 and this date is considered Soundstream's birthday. "Feels Like Heaven" reached #56 in Soundclick Dance chart. The next one was an instrumental track "Rainy Day". After a while they started collaborating with Andrew Sinenko, who helped with some ideas.

"Save You" was released in November 2008. It was the first Soundstream song to feature Kate Lesing on vocals. By the end of the year "See Me Now" was out and did well in Ukraine, Russia and Singapore.

In early April 2009, Soundstream released their debut album entitled "Number One". Soon they started working on new material. However, there were some disagreements between the band and Andrew Sinenko. Since the end of 2008 they argued about many things. That was why the band stopped collaborating with him, so the work on the next album continued without his participation.

The second album entitled Partytime was out in the end of May 2009. It contains 12 track, among which are "Do You Feel My Love", "Everlasting", "Could I Feel This Way Forever" and others. A bit later, another two new tracks were recorded - "Yesterday Becomes Tomorrow" and "Planet Beats & Bass", which were rather different from band's previous songs.

=== Music style change ===
In mid-June 2009, Soundstream had to temporary stop its activities as Bulya went to USA for 2 months. The band resumed work on new material in September. The new album "Midnight Hour", released in October 2009, confirmed that the band decided to change its music style. The new album was made mainly in hard trance style and reminds a bit Scooter with the exception for "One By One", which was made in a typical for the band Hands Up style. Two songs from "Midnight Hour" entered PromoDJ FM rotation - "Planet Beats & Bass" and "Better Way (New Version)"

=== From duo to trio ===
In the middle of October Darya Bezkorovayna joined Soundstream as a female vocalist and they started working on their first song with her participance. Despite the fact that their music style change was positively welcomed Soundstream decided to return to its classic sound. New song entitled "Story Of My Life" was planned to be finished in November, but the band members had to postpone it. They were too busy with the studies after the quarantine due to epidemic of influenza and actually had no free time. It was finally out in February 2010 and became the only song which featured Darya Bezkorovayna as she unexpectedly decided to leave Soundstream very soon after that. Soundstream again transformed to duo.

In June their 4th album "Dancefloor Generation" was out. While working on this album Soundstream experimented with Electro-House elements, which makes it different from the previous ones, and some tracks from it can be characterized as a blend of Hands Up and Electro-House (e.g. "Running"). There is also a few pure Electro-House tracks (e.g. "Temptation"). The track "Clubland" reached #36 in Soundclick House Chart.

In September they recorded a new song entitled "SOUNDSTREAM Plays 4 U!", which was aired on well-known radiostation Clubberry.FM (Moscow). And in late October Soundstream was joined by the vocalist Ann Pazyura. Soon they recorded a song entitled "One More Time" with her.

In February 2011 they covered Kim Wilde's hit "You Came". By the end of the month they got an attention of Radio KPI, a radiostation of the university, where the band founders studied.

In May Soundstream in collaboration with MC Yama recorded an Electro-House song entitled "I Believe", which reached #35 in Soundclick House Chart.

Trying to improve their positions on Asian market they registered at the Singaporean site music412.com, where they stayed as #1 artist during 2011–2013.

In late August they released their 5th album "One More Time", named after the main hit on it. One of the most notable tracks was "Away", which was widely promoted by the German DJ team HDStylez!. However it charted badly, reaching only #114 in Soundclick Dance Chart.

In the middle of November Soundstream started giving signs of life again and recorded a new song entitled "Feel It". In this song the band demonstrated new sound: following the example of Scooter, they decided not to use most of the previously used instruments, at the same time not completely giving up the traditions of their style. A bit later an instrumental track "No Surrender" followed, which in a few days entered PromoDJ FM rotation.

=== New story ===
Due to some temporary difficulties at the beginning of 2012 Soundstream didn't record any new songs for a long time. There were even some rumors that the band doesn't exist any more, but that were just rumors, which were not true, because in May Soundstream was back with a new track, entitled "Life Can Never Be The Same". But later one unpleasant thing happened, the founding member Bulya decided to leave Soundstream. He was replaced by DJ Spacedreamer and it was the beginning of the new story of Soundstream. DJ Spacedreamer was not a newbie in music and has already had some success in his own project. He was very familiar with Soundstream's music before he joined the band and that's why he quickly got on the inside.

In August, the song Music Takes Control was out, and it was the first Soundstream's song which featured DJ Spacedreamer. It reached #34 in Soundclick Dance chart and it was a big success for a band since no Soundstream's song had reached such a high position in that chart before.

In early November 2013, they presented another new song, entitled "We Are Alive", which clarified that they are still on the case. This song sounded very different from Soundstream's previous works: it contained Dubstep elements and 6/8-rhythm were introduced for the first time. At the beginning of December it reached #1 at Dancefloor Movement Top-20. Also it was announced that the next album is going to be released the next year. Owing to this song Soundstream entered PromoDJ Top-100 in 2014. However, in the first half of 2014 the band showed no activity because of very unstable political situation in Ukraine. They were back only in the end of June with the new song entitled "One Nation", which was a kind of a call for unity of the country. It reached #3 in Dancefloor Movement Top-20 and #30 in Soundclick Dance Chart.

In late October, Soundstream's new album "Resurrection" was finally out. It was the first one recorded with the new line-up. Comparatively to the previous albums, this one was more diverse and contained songs in different music styles: Hands Up (e.g. "Music Takes Control", "Life Can Never Be The Same", "No Surrender"), Eurodance (e.g. "One Nation"), "Midnight Hour"-like hard trance (e.g. "World Of Freedom"), Dubstep (e.g. "Future In Your Hands") and some kind of blend of hands up and electro-house (e.g. "Feel It", "Back In Time"). In a week after "Resurrection" was out, "Music Takes Control", "We Are Alive" and "Life Can Never Be The Same" entered PromoDJ FM rotation. After a month "Life Can Never Be The Same" also was aired on the British core FM radio.

In January 2015, Soundstream was selected as Pick Of The Week by MuzicNotez. Later they recorded "Party Hard (Here Comes The Night)" which had some success in Hungary. In June MusicNotez selected Soundstream as a featured artist.

In the middle of December Soundstream released the 7th album entitled "Maxximum Drive".

In February 2016, Soundstream introduced new song entitled "Waitin' For Changes". In March the band signed to German label DMN Records. In early May "Waitin' For Changes" was officially released under this label for the first time on "Male Muscle Training Hits 2016" compilation.

On September 1 the band introduced its first music video for the forthcoming single "Reach a Star", which gained more than 1000 views on YouTube in a month. For the first time this song appeared on September 23 on "Future Eurodance Hits 2016" compilation. The single was released on October 12.

== Line-up ==
=== Current members ===
- Ann Pazyura – lead vocalist (2010 — present)
- Sergey Podolsky – MC (2020 — present)
- DJ FatCat – keyboardist/producer/composer (2008 — present)

=== Past members ===
- Darya Bezkorovayna – lead vocalist (2009 — 2010)
- Bulya – MC (2008 — 2012)
- DJ Spacedreamer – MC (2012 — 2020)

== Discography ==
=== Studio albums ===
- Number One (2009)
- Partytime (2009)
- Midnight Hour (2009)
- Dancefloor Generation (2010)
- One More Time (2011)
- Resurrection (2014)
- Maxximum Drive (2015)
- Way To The Stars (2018)
- Summer Wave (2020)

=== Compilations ===
- Megamix (2009)
- Remixes Collection (2009)

=== Singles ===
- Reach a Star (2016)
- Back Once Again (2017)
- Dream For A Better World (2017)
- Time To Fly (feat. Freeze) (2018)
- Summer Nights (2018)
- Find Another Way (feat. Freeze) (2019)

== Chart history ==
We Are Alive

| Chart | Position |
|---|---|
| (Germany) Dancefloor Movement Top-20 | 1 |

One Nation

| Chart | Position |
|---|---|
| (Germany) Dancefloor Movement Top-20 | 3 |

Reach a Star

| Chart | Position |
|---|---|
| (European Union) Eurodance Hitlist Top-50 | 1 |
| (Germany) Dancefloor Movement Top-20 | 2 |

Back Once Again

| Chart | Position |
|---|---|
| (European Union) Eurodance Hitlist Top-50 | 1 |
| iTunes Top-100 Electronic Albums (Spain) | 1 |
| (Switzerland) Swiss Dance Chart | 109 |
| iTunes Top-200 Songs (Poland) | 129 |

Dream For a Better World

| Chart | Position |
|---|---|
| (European Union) Eurodance Hitlist Top-50 | 1 |

Time To Fly (feat. Freeze)

| Chart | Position |
|---|---|
| (European Union) Eurodance Hitlist Top-50 | 1 |
| (Switzerland) Swiss Dance Chart | 51 |

Summer Nights

| Chart | Position |
|---|---|
| (European Union) Eurodance Hitlist Top-50 | 1 |
| Drooble Radio Top-30 | 1 |
| (Germany) RauteMusik.FM Chart | 1 |
| (Bosnia and Herzegovina) Day Dee Eurodance Radio Top-25 | 1 |
| (United States) LongeFM Radio Top-10 | 2 |
| (China) DJUU Weekly Chart | 4 |
| iTunes Top-100 Dance Albums (Argentina) | 26 |
| (European Union) Euro Indie Music Chart | 71 |
| (United Kingdom) Juno UK Chart | 76 |
| (Switzerland) Swiss Dance Chart | 110 |

Find Another Way (feat. Freeze)

| Chart | Position |
|---|---|
| (European Union) Eurodance Hitlist Top-50 | 1 |
| iTunes Top-100 Dance Albums (Canada) | 15 |

Big City Lights

| Chart | Position |
|---|---|
| (European Union) Eurodance Hitlist Top-50 | 1 |
| (Switzerland) Swiss Dance Chart | 73 |

Summer Nights (New Remixes)

| Chart | Position |
|---|---|
| (Switzerland) Swiss Dance Chart | 116 |

== Achievements ==
| Year | Achievement |
|---|---|
| 2011 | ShowBiza - Top-10 |
| 2013 | ShowBiza - Top-10 |
| 2015 | MuzicNotez - Pick Of The Week |
| 2015 | MuzicNotez - Featured Artist |
