= Da Ya Think I'm Sexy? =

1978 single by Rod Stewart

"Da Ya Think I'm Sexy"

Single by Rod Stewart

from the album Blondes Have More Fun
- B-side: "Dirty Weekend"; "Scarred and Scared"
- Released: 10 November 1978
- Genre: Disco
- Length: 4:19 (single version); 5:31 (album version); 6:29 (12-inch version)
- Label: Warner Bros.
- Songwriters: Rod Stewart; Carmine Appice; Duane Hitchings
- Producer: Tom Dowd

Rod Stewart singles chronology
"Ole Ola (Mulher Brasileira)" (1978)	"Da Ya Think I'm Sexy" (1978)	"Ain't Love a Bitch" (1979)

Music video
- "Da Ya Think I'm Sexy?" on YouTube

"Da Ya Think I'm Sexy?", also written "Da' Ya' Think I'm Sexy", is a song by British singer Rod Stewart from his ninth studio album, Blondes Have More Fun (1978). It was written by Stewart, Carmine Appice, and Duane Hitchings, though it incorporates the melody from the song "Taj Mahal" by Jorge Ben Jor and the string arrangement from the song "(If You Want My Love) Put Something Down On It" by Bobby Womack.

The song was released as the first single from Blondes Have More Fun in November 1978. It spent one week atop the UK Singles Chart in December 1978 and four weeks atop the US Billboard Hot 100 in February 1979. Billboard ranked it number four on its Top Singles of 1979 year-end chart. It also topped the charts in Canada for four weeks and in Australia for two weeks.

Royalties from the song were donated to the United Nations Children's Fund (UNICEF) and Stewart performed the song at the Music for UNICEF Concert at the United Nations General Assembly in January 1979.

== Background and writing ==
Carmine Appice, who played drums on this song, told Songfacts: "This was a story of a guy meeting a chick in a club. At that time, that was a cool saying. If you listen to the lyrics, 'She sits alone, waiting for suggestions, he's so nervous...' it's the feelings of what was going on in a dance club. The guy sees a chick he digs, she's nervous and he's nervous and she's alone and doesn't know what's going on, then they end up at his place having sex, and then she's gone." In a 2007 interview, co-writer Duane Hitchings noted that "Da Ya Think I'm Sexy?" was "a spoof on guys from the 'cocaine lounge lizards' of the Saturday Night Fever days. We Rock and Roll guys thought we were dead meat when that movie and the Bee Gees came out. The Bee Gees were brilliant musicians and really nice people. No big egos. Rod, in his brilliance, decided to do a spoof on disco. VERY smart man. There is no such thing as a 'dumb' super success in the music business."

After Rod Stewart rejected the original arrangement for the song, Appice instead used it for "I Just Fell in Love Again" on Carmen Maki's 1979 album Night Stalker, which he was working on at the same time.

Guitarist Jim Cregan attributed the song's success to the bass guitar line played by Phil Chen, saying "That particular bass pattern, when he played that, the whole song seemed to fall into place. I was doing my Nile Rodgers impersonations."

== Music and lyrics ==
Stewart biographer Sean Egan said of the music that "Stewart and his crew expertly purvey disco's four-on-the-floor drumbeat, clipped guitar approach, and throbbing bass style", adding that the song also contains a "soaring synth riff and a howling sax line."

Egan noted "a strange disconnect between choruses and verses." Egan described the choruses as "vainglorious, juvenile, icky and concerned with physical pleasure" but described the verses as being "unshowy and moving, revolving around a couple's mutual quest to find an intimacy deeper than sex in the heart of the pitiless, big city."

== Reception ==
The song was criticised by many in the rock press as a betrayal of Stewart's blues-oriented rock roots, due to its disco-like arrangement, but Stewart and others were quick to point out that other widely respected artists, such as Paul McCartney and the Rolling Stones, had also released disco-flavoured songs. However, the song has since experienced some retrospective acclaim as Rolling Stone placed the song at number 301 in its 2004 list of the 500 Greatest Songs of All Time.

Cash Box said it has "a clipping bass line [by Phil Chen], steady kick drum and soaring synthesized strings", as well as "alternately gentle and dashing rhythm guitar work and a commanding sax solo".

== Plagiarism ==
It has been noted that Stewart created parts of the song through musical plagiarism. A copyright infringement lawsuit by Brazilian musician Jorge Ben Jor claimed the chorus of the song had been derived from his song "Taj Mahal". The case was "settled amicably" according to Jorge Ben Jor, in Ben Jor's favor; the single’s royalties were donated to UNICEF. Stewart admitted in his 2012 autobiography to "unconscious plagiarism" of the Ben Jor song, which he had heard while attending the Rio Carnival in 1978. He also admitted that he had consciously lifted the song's signature synthesizer riff from the string arrangement on Bobby Womack's "(If You Want My Love) Put Something Down on It". Stewart contends that it is legal to lift a line from any song's arrangement as long as the core melody line is not copied.

Guitarist Jim Cregan claimed that the song was "inspired in part" by the Rolling Stones' "Miss You". Ian McLagan, who played electric piano on "Miss You" and has also played with Stewart, claimed that "It's a rip-off of 'Miss You'".

== Charts ==
=== Weekly charts ===
Chart (1978–1979)	Peak position
Argentina	2
Australia (Kent Music Report)	1
Austria (Ö3 Austria Top 40)	8
Belgium (Ultratop 50 Flanders)	3
Canada Top Singles (RPM)	1
Canada Adult Contemporary (RPM)	1
Canada Disco 30 (RPM)	7
Finland (Finnish Singles Chart)	9
France (SNEP)	2
Ireland (IRMA)	5
Japan (Oricon)	12
Netherlands (Dutch Top 40)	4
Netherlands (Single Top 100)	6
New Zealand (Recorded Music NZ)	2
Norway (VG-lista)	2
Portugal Singles Chart	1
Spain (AFE)	1
Sweden (Sverigetopplistan)	11
Switzerland (Schweizer Hitparade)	8
UK Singles (OCC)	1
US Billboard Hot 100	1
US Hot R&B/Hip-Hop Songs (Billboard)	5
US Dance Club Songs (Billboard)	1
US Cash Box Top 100	1
West Germany (GfK)	9

=== Year-end charts ===
Chart (1978)	Position
Australia (Kent Music Report)	95
UK Singles (OCC)	18

Chart (1979)	Position
Australia (Kent Music Report)	7
Belgium (Ultratop)	47
Canada Top Singles (RPM)	15
Netherlands (Dutch Top 40)	90
Netherlands (Single Top 100)	71
US Billboard Hot 100	4
West Germany (Media Control)	39

=== All-time charts ===
Chart (1958–2018)	Position
US Billboard Hot 100	180

== Certifications ==
Region	Certification	Certified units/sales
Belgium	—	100,000
Denmark	—	10,000
France (SNEP)	Gold	500,000^{*}
New Zealand (RMNZ)	Platinum	30,000^{‡}
United Kingdom (BPI)	Gold	500,000^{^}
United States (RIAA)	Platinum	2,000,000^{^}
^{*} Sales figures based on certification alone.^{^} Shipments figures based on certification alone.^{‡} Sales+streaming figures based on certification alone.

== Tiny Tim version ==
"Do Ya Think I'm Sexy?"

Single by Tiny Tim with Gary Lawrence and his Sizzling Syncopators
- B-side: "Feelings"
- Released: 1982
- Recorded: 1982
- Studio: Inroads, Miami, Florida
- Length: 3:55
- Label: Vo-Do-De-O-Do
- Songwriters: Rod Stewart; Carmine Appice; Duane Hitchings
- Producer: Gary Lawrence

In 1979, Tiny Tim performed "Do Ya Think I'm Sexy" on several television shows, including his final appearance on The Tonight Show Starring Johnny Carson. During the performance, Tiny removed his jacket and dress shirt, which he tossed "to the cheering audience" before lifting his T-shirt, "bouncing wildly on his knees", and writhing on the stage for effect. Afterwards, Johnny Carson remarked, "There's just nothing that can be said."

In 1982, Tiny recorded a version of the song "in the style of Al Jolson". Gary Lawrence produced the song and released it as a single on his record label, Vo-Do-De-O-Do. Tim also appeared in a music video for the song, which aired on public-access television in Florida. Lawrence later stated, "The truth of the matter was basically Neil Hollander and Banner Talent were supposed to market the record and get me a deal with a label that would put it out and they actually dropped the ball on the whole thing".

== Revolting Cocks version ==
"Da Ya Think I'm Sexy?"

Single by Revolting Cocks

from the album Linger Ficken' Good
- B-side: "Sergio Guitar"; "Wrong Sexy Mix"
- Released: 6 September 1993
- Genre: Industrial rock; industrial dance
- Length: 5:34
- Label: Sire; Reprise; Warner Bros.
- Songwriters: Rod Stewart; Carmine Appice; Duane Hitchings
- Producer: Revolting Cocks

Revolting Cocks singles chronology
"Beers, Steers, and Queers" (1990)	"Da Ya Think I'm Sexy?" (1993)	"Cocked and Loaded" (2006)

Music video
- "Da Ya Think I'm Sexy?"

American-Belgian industrial supergroup Revolting Cocks recorded a version of "Da Ya Think I'm Sexy?" for their album Linger Ficken' Good. The song was released as a single in September 1993 with the songs "Sergio Guitar" and "Wrong Sexy Mix" as B-sides. This version includes slightly altered lyrics (the lyric "Give me a dime so I can call my mother" is replaced with "Give me a buck so I can buy a rubber" and "He says, I'm sorry, but I'm out of milk and coffee" is replaced with "He says, I'm sorry, but I'm out of KY Jelly").

=== Track listing ===
All tracks by Revolting Cocks unless noted.

No.	Title	Writer(s)	Length
1.	"Da Ya Think I'm Sexy?"	Rod Stewart, Carmine Appice, Duane Hitchings	5:35
2.	"Sergio Guitar"		6:32
3.	"Wrong Sexy Mix"		4:51
Total length:			16:58

=== Charts ===
Chart (1993)	Position
UK Singles (OCC)	61

== N-Trance featuring Rod Stewart version ==
"Da Ya Think I'm Sexy?"

Single by N-Trance featuring Rod Stewart

from the album Happy Hour
- Released: 20 October 1997
- Length: 3:59
- Label: All Around the World
- Songwriters: Rod Stewart; Carmine Appice; Duane Hitchings
- Producers: Curds; Whey

N-Trance singles chronology
"D.I.S.C.O." (1997)	"Da Ya Think I'm Sexy?" (1997)	"Paradise City" (1998)

Rod Stewart singles chronology
"When I Need You" (1997)	"Da Ya Think I'm Sexy?" (1997)	"Ooh La La" (1998)

Music video
- "Da Ya Think I'm Sexy?" on YouTube

In 1997, the song was remixed by British electronic dance music group N-Trance for their second album, Happy Hour (1998), and features lyrics from the Millie Jackson version (as performed by vocalist Kelly Llorenna). It was featured in the film A Night at the Roxbury the following year. This version became a hit in late 1997, topping both the New Zealand Singles Chart for three weeks and the Czech Republic singles chart. Additionally, the song peaked at number seven on the UK Singles Chart and earning a double-platinum sales certification in Australia, where it peaked at number three on the ARIA Singles Chart.

=== Critical reception ===
Larry Flick from Billboard described the song as "another slice of flashback fever". He noted that "with its recognizable hook, booty-shakin' baseline, guest rap by Ricardo da Force, diva wailings by Kelly Llorenna, and Stewart himself, this updated remake could very well become the surprise radio hit of the summer. Of course, it could also become this month's novelty record." British magazine Music Week rated N-Trance's version four out of five in their review.

=== Charts ===
==== Weekly charts ====
Chart (1997–1998)	Peak position
Australia (ARIA)	3
Austria (Ö3 Austria Top 40)	9
Belgium (Ultratop 50 Flanders)	15
Belgium (Ultratop 50 Wallonia)	10
Czech Republic (IFPI)	1
Denmark (IFPI)	5
Estonia (Eesti Top 20)	7
Europe (Eurochart Hot 100)	7
Finland (Suomen virallinen lista)	5
France (SNEP)	33
Germany (GfK)	15
Hungary (Mahasz)	5
Ireland (IRMA)	10
Italy (Musica e dischi)	3
Italy Airplay (Music & Media)	3
Netherlands (Dutch Top 40)	13
Netherlands (Single Top 100)	23
New Zealand (Recorded Music NZ)	1
Norway (VG-lista)	10
Scottish Singles Sales (Official Charts)	6
Sweden (Sverigetopplistan)	15
Switzerland (Schweizer Hitparade)	21
UK Singles (Official Charts)	7
UK Dance (Official Charts)	30

==== Year-end charts ====
Chart (1997)	Position
Australia (ARIA)	11
Belgium (Ultratop 50 Flanders)	99
Belgium (Ultratop 50 Wallonia)	80
Europe (Eurochart Hot 100)	67
New Zealand (RIANZ)	43
Sweden (Topplistan)	62
UK Singles (OCC)	86

=== Certifications ===
Region	Certification	Certified units/sales
Australia (ARIA)	2× Platinum	140,000^{^}
New Zealand (RMNZ)	Platinum	10,000^{*}
Norway (IFPI Norway)	Gold	
^{*} Sales figures based on certification alone.^{^} Shipments figures based on certification alone.

== 2017 DNCE remix version ==
"Da Ya Think I'm Sexy?"

Single by Rod Stewart featuring DNCE
- Released: 25 August 2017
- Length: 3:50
- Label: Republic
- Songwriters: Rod Stewart; Carmine Appice; Duane Hitchings; Rami Yacoub; Albin Nedler; Kristoffer Fogelmark
- Producers: Rami; Albin Nedler; Kristoffer Fogelmark; Kevin Savigar; Chris Sclafani

Rod Stewart singles chronology
"Please" (2015)	"Da Ya Think I'm Sexy?" (2017)	"Didn't I" (2018)

DNCE singles chronology
"Kissing Strangers" (2017)	"Da Ya Think I'm Sexy?" (2017)	"Dance" (2018)

Lyric video
- "Da Ya Think I'm Sexy?" on YouTube

On 25 August 2017, Rod Stewart released a remix version, which features a guest appearance from American band DNCE. He sings along with Joe Jonas, the lead singer of the band. The singer and the band performed the song together at 2017 MTV Video Music Awards two days later.

=== Track listing ===
Digital download – 2017
No.	Title	Length
1.	"Da Ya Think I'm Sexy" (featuring DNCE)	3:50

=== Charts ===
==== Weekly charts ====
Chart (2017–2018)	Peak position
Argentina Anglo (Monitor Latino)	13
Belgium (Ultratip Bubbling Under Flanders)	34
Hungary (Rádiós Top 40)	27
Israel International Airplay (Media Forest)	1
Poland Airplay (ZPAV)	27
US Adult Contemporary (Billboard)	11
US Adult Pop Airplay (Billboard)	34

==== Year-end charts ====
Chart (2017)	Position
US Adult Contemporary (Billboard)	32
Chart (2018)	Position
US Adult Contemporary (Billboard)	46

=== Release history ===
Region	Date	Format	Label	Ref.
Various	25 August 2017	Digital download	Republic	

== 2021 Carmine Appice/Fernando Perdomo Project version ==
"Da Ya Think I'm Sexy?"

Song by Carmine Appice/Fernando Perdomo Project

from the album Energy Overload
- Released: 24 September 2021
- Length: 5:05
- Label: Cleopatra
- Songwriters: Rod Stewart; Carmine Appice; Rami Yacoub; Duane Hitchings; Albin Nedler; Kristoffer Fodgelmark; Fernando Perdomo
- Producers: Carmine Appice; Fernando Perdomo

In 2021, Appice and Fernando Perdomo released an instrumental rock album, Energy Overload, that includes what Eric Harabadian of Music Connection Magazine describes as a "harmonic and rhythmic renovation" of "Da Ya Think I'm Sexy?".

== Parodies ==
- In 1979, Steve Dahl along with his band Teenage Radiation released a parody titled "Do You Think I'm Disco?"
