= Kelly Llorenna =

English dance music singer (born 1975)

- Born: 1 May 1975 (age 51); Slough, Berkshire, England
- Origin: Oldham, Greater Manchester, England
- Genre: Electronic dance music
- Years active: 1992–present
- Labels: All Around the World Records (UK, 2001–2009); Love to Infinity Records
- Website: MySpace page

Kelly Llorenna (born 1 May 1975) is an English dance music singer, who was born in Slough, Berkshire and raised in Oldham, Greater Manchester. She is best known as the former lead vocalist for the dance group N-Trance in the 1990s. Their biggest hit was "Set You Free", which made the UK top five in early 1995. Since then, she has had six UK top 10 singles.

== Biography ==
=== 1992–1994: Debut with N-Trance ===
After attending stage school for a short time, Kelly Llorenna started her music career in 1992 as part of the dance act N-Trance, providing vocals to "Set You Free" which originally was not a success. Following several re-releases, the song reached number 2 in the UK Singles Chart in January 1995.

=== 1995–2000: Solo debut and return to N-Trance ===
In 1995, Llorenna released her first solo track entitled "Brighter Day". An accompanying video was created but was released for promotional purposes only. She also recorded a cover version of "One Day I'll Fly Away", but this was never released.

In 1997, Llorenna returned to N-Trance for their cover version of the Rod Stewart hit record "Da Ya Think I'm Sexy" which reached number 7 in the UK chart. She also contributed as an uncredited vocalist on several other N-Trance tracks including "The Mind of the Machine", "Tears in the Rain" and "Shake Ya Body". "Set You Free" was released for the fourth time on the All Around the World record label in 2001, this time reaching number 4 in the chart.

=== 2001–2006: Second solo career ===
In 2001, Llorenna teamed up with Flip & Fill to record a cover version of "True Love Never Dies", co-written by then-Darlington based Tom Cullimore, which reached number 34 in the UK chart, although it was re-released in 2002 and reached number 7. She re-launched her solo career with the label All Around the World in 2002 with a cover of the Taylor Dayne track, "Tell It to My Heart". A new version of a previous track "Heart of Gold" was also released the same year, charting at 19 in the UK chart.

A solo album was released which included five singles and seven new tracks. Many of the tracks on the album were produced and written with Flip & Fill, along with some of her own writing contributions. In 2002, another single by N-Trance entitled "Forever" was released which reached number 6, giving her fifth Top 10 hit. In 2003, "Destiny" was released by N-Trance charting at number 37, but this was to be her final collaborative effort with them for some time due to working difficulties.

In 2004, she reached number 15 in the UK chart with a cover of Donna Summer's, "This Time I Know It's for Real". A new track entitled "Nobody Like You" was recorded by her in 2005, along with a video, but was never released. In 2007, she released a cover of Lara Fabian's, "I Will Love Again", which did not reach the official UK chart.

=== 2007–2008: Return to N-Trance ===
In 2007, she once again rejoined Kevin O'Toole of N-Trance to record the new tracks for their forthcoming album. Some of these tracks included "Nothing Lasts Forever" (released in 2009), "Stronger" (written specially for Kelly) and "You're My Angel". She also appeared on some of the tracks on their other new album – The Mind of the Machine which was originally due for release in the 1990s.

She has also been working with Love to Infinity on a number of new tracks for their forthcoming album, including "Hot Stuff" (a Donna Summer track), "Keep Love Together" (a previous Love to Infinity track) and "You Gotta Love Me" (a new creation).

=== 2009: Return to solo career ===
She released her seventh solo track with All Around the World in 2009, which was a cover of the Madonna song, "Dress You Up". This track along with many others was sung on the Clubland Live tour at the end of 2008. It was announced by N-Trance that Llorenna had once again left the band in order to concentrate on her solo career. In Music Week magazine, it was announced that "Dress You Up" had reached number one in the upfront club chart, and that she will soon be releasing a new single with Love to Infinity.

=== 2010: Freak Asylum ===
Llorenna has formed a new band with Love to Infinity, known as Freak Asylum, and worked with Peter Hook from New Order. Other collaborators on the Freak Asylum album include Toby Gad, Shane Gibson (Korn) and George Lynch (Lynch Mob).

Freak Asylum's album, Let the Madness Begin was to be released in 2011. Llorenna filmed videos for the Freak Asylum singles, "You Better Leave" "Fetish" and "Throwaway Girl".

== Discography ==
=== Solo discography ===
==== Albums ====
Year	Title	UK	Label	Certifications
2002	All Clubbed Up – The Best of Kelly Llorenna	#62	All Around the World	BPI: Gold

==== Singles ====
Year	Title	Album	UK Chart Position	Label	Certifications	Notes
1995	"Set You Free"	-	#2	AATW Records		
1995	"Brighter Day"	All Clubbed Up	#43	Pukka Records		Re-recorded in 2002
1996	"One Day I'll Fly Away"	-	-	Pukka Records		Promotional only release
2001	"Set You Free"	-	#4	AATW Records		
2002	"True Love Never Dies"	-	#7	AATW Records		
2002	"Tell It to My Heart"	All Clubbed Up	#9	All Around the World	BPI: Gold	
2002	"Heart of Gold"	All Clubbed Up	#19	All Around the World		
2003	"Forever"		#6	All Around the World		
2004	"This Time I Know It's for Real"	-	#14	All Around the World		
2006	"Nobody Like You"	-	-	All Around the World		Promotional only release
2007	"I Will Love Again"	-	#105	All Around the World		
2007	"Before You Love Me"	-	-	All Around the World		Digital only release
2009	"Dress You Up"	-	-	All Around the World		

=== Work with N-Trance ===
Please see N-Trance discography for more information.

=== Work with other artists ===
These tracks have been released as singles / have yet to be released as singles.

Year	Title	Artist	UK Chart Position	Label	Certifications	Notes
1998	"Heart of Gold"	Force & Styles	#55	-		
2001	"True Love Never Dies"	Flip & Fill	#34	All Around the World	BPI: Silver	First release
2002	"True Love Never Dies"	Flip & Fill	#7	All Around the World		Second release
2008	"Keep Love Together"	Love to Infinity	-	All Around the World		Digital only release
2009	"Sweetest Day of May"	Love to Infinity	-	-		Avex Japan
2009	"Hot Stuff"	Love to Infinity	-	-		Avex Japan / Centaur USA
2009	"You Gotta Love Me"	Love to Infinity	-	-		Avex Japan

=== Other contributions ===
These tracks have not been released as singles.

Year	Title	Artist	Label	Notes
2002	"Fantasy"	Lockout	-	-
2006	"Let the Music Play"	Riffs & Rays	-	-
2006	"All Time High"	-	-	-
2008	"Lift Me Up"	DJ Shah	-	-

== See also ==
- List of Eurodance artists
- List of performers on Top of the Pops
