= Ricardo da Force =

- Ricardo Da Force in 2012

Background information
- Also known as: Mutch Love, Ricardo Lyte, Ricky Rick
- Born: Jervis Ricardo Alfonso Lyte; 30 April 1967
- Died: 8 March 2013 (aged 45)
- Occupations: Singer, rapper, DJ
- Years active: 1990–2000
- Formerly of: The KLF, N-Trance

Jervis Ricardo Alfonso Lyte (30 April 1967 – 8 March 2013), known professionally as Ricardo da Force, was an English vocalist, rapper, and DJ, most notable for contributing vocals to house and dance music tracks of the KLF and N-Trance. He got his stage name from a track he rapped by the band X-10-CIV called "The Force" along with Shola Phillips.

Later in his life, he was resident DJ at The Apartment in Dubai.

Lyte died on 8 March 2013 while in Barbados.

== Discography ==
Artist	Song	Year	Role / Peak position	Ref
Manic MC's	"The Beat"	1990		
Adamski	"The Space Jungle"	1990	Credited performer / UK #7	
X-10-CIV	"The Force"	1991	Rapper	
The KLF	"3 a.m. Eternal"	1991	Credited performer / UK #1	
The KLF	"Last Train to Trancentral"	1991	Credited performer / UK #2	
The KLF	"Justified & Ancient"	1991	Credited performer / UK #2	
Vibes Alive	"The Spoken Word"	1991	Co-writer	
(solo)	"Let the House Goes On"	1991		
Adamski	"Back to Front"	1992		
Fire Island	"Fire Island"	1992	UK #66	
Vitamino	"What I've Got"	1992		
Dr Baker	"Global Kaos"	1992		
(solo)	"Set Ya Free"	1992		
Inside Heaven	"Sex Is the Answer"	1993		
International Foot Language	"Life on Loop"	1993		
Clubzone	"Hands Up"	1994		
Clubzone	"Passion of the Night"	1995		
N-Trance	"Electronic Pleasure"	1995		
N-Trance	"Stayin' Alive"	1995	Rapping / UK #2	
Trancylvania (featuring Ricky)	"Colour of Love"	1995	NOR #6	
Greed	"Pump Up the Volume"	1995	UK #51	
(solo)	"Why?"	1996	UK #58	
Ramp	"Rock the Discotek"	1996		
N-Trance (featuring Rod Stewart)	"Da Ya Think I'm Sexy?"	1997	UK #7	
N-Trance	"D.I.S.C.O."	1997		
N-Trance	"Paradise City"	1998		
N-Trance	"Broken Dreams"	1998		
England Supporters Band	"The Great Escape 2000"	2000	Rapping	
Atomic Kitten	"I Want Your Love"	2000	Initial copies contained a sample of the KLF's "Justified & Ancient"	
