= Set You Free (N-Trance song) =

1993 single by N-Trance

Single by N-Trance

from the album Electronic Pleasure
- Released: 4 October 1993
- Recorded: 1992
- Studio: PWL (London, England, 1992); Out of the Blue (Manchester, England, 1994)
- Genre: Euro-NRG; rave
- Length: 7:16 (original mix); 4:22 (original radio edit/video version); 4:11 (original edit)
- Label: All Around the World
- Songwriter: N-Trance
- Producer: N-Trance

N-Trance singles chronology
"Set You Free" (1993)	"Stayin' Alive" (1995)

Music video
- "Set You Free" on YouTube

"Set You Free" is a song written and recorded by English rave band N-Trance, featuring vocals from English singer Kelly Llorenna. It was officially released as a single in October 1993 by label All Around the World but did not chart until a re-release in April the following year, just making the UK top 40 at number 39. Another re-release in January 1995 was much more successful, peaking at number two in the UK. It was later included on the band's debut album, Electronic Pleasure (1995). The song was remixed and re-released in 2001, this time reaching number four. Its accompanying music video was directed by Steve Price and filmed on location in the UK.

== Background ==
The song was inspired by a night out in the Haçienda in Manchester that N-Trance's Kevin O'Toole had in 1989. "They used to pass round pints of water, and a woman came up to me and I felt her heartbeat through her top," he said. "The songs created a diary of what was happening at the time."

Llorenna was only 16 when she recorded the vocals in 1992. She told Vice: "Kevin [O'Toole] and Dale [Longworth, the other member of N-Trance] came into my college and asked if anyone sung, and everyone replied 'Kelly sings!'" They later headed to O'Toole's bedroom studio to do a vocal demo. For Llorenna, her vocals "captured that childhood moment in time. It was just me and five lads in a transit van going up to Belfast or Glasgow every week, playing the song for petrol money." She claims that when people hear the opening of the song, which features thunder, lightning and rain, "their faces light up, and they're transported back to where they were."

== Critical reception ==
Larry Flick from Billboard magazine described the song as a "lively Euro-NRG romp". In December 1994, Music Week wrote, "This record is now on its third release simply because retail and club reaction has demanded it. With 50,000 copies already sold, this very Euro dance-style tune could finally make the big time thanks to a strong chorus and less of the normal quota of Euro cheese." In his UK chart commentary, James Masterton said, "I would personally argue that this is a terrible record. It starts promisingly, with a strong melody powerfully sung. Thirty seconds in though this is all but swamped by a frantic rave beat, [...] N-Trance have been making inroads on the chart for over a year now but this is the first major hit for them. It is, as I said, a terrible record, but it has made No.6 first week out so what do I know?" Simon Price from Melody Maker described "Set You Free" as "thunderous, monsoon-drenched". James Hamilton from the Record Mirror Dance Update described it as a "girl wailed still dated 1992 raver, huge in Scotland", "with thunderstorm started ultra-frantic 0-145.5-0-145.5bpm Original" in his weekly dance column.

== Chart performance ==
The 1995 version of "Set You Free" was successful on the charts in Europe, peaking at number two on the UK Singles Chart on 5 February 1995. It peaked at that position during its fifth week on the chart, being kept off the number-one position by Celine Dion's "Think Twice". The single spent a total of 15 weeks within the UK Top 100. It also entered the top 10 in Ireland and the Netherlands, as well as on the Eurochart Hot 100, where it peaked at number nine in its fifth week on the chart on 18 February. On the European Dance Radio Chart, it peaked at number one on March 4, becoming the most played dance song on radio in Europe that week.

Additionally, "Set You Free" was a top-20 hit in Sweden and Switzerland, peaking at numbers 15 and 18 respectively, while in Germany, it became a top-50 hit. Outside Europe, the single was successful in Australia, where it reached number 11 on the ARIA singles chart, with 12 weeks inside the Australian top 20 and 21 weeks in total. It earned a gold record there, with a sale of 35,000 singles and a double platinum record in the UK, after 1,200,000 units were sold and streamed.

== Music video ==
The music video for "Set You Free" was directed by prolific music video director Steve Price and shot in various locations in County Durham and North Yorkshire. The video comprises scenes of fireworks, the band dancing and singing in a nightclub, in front of Clifford's Tower in York, England and travelling in a stretched limousine. The scene at Clifford's Tower was fortuitously or coincidentally shot on 3 November 1994, which coincided with an annual Guy Fawkes Night Fireworks display organised by York City Council. The nightclub scenes were shot at Bianco's, Stockton-on-Tees. It is claimed that the video cost around £5,000 to make. "Set You Free" was a Box Top on British music television channel The Box in February 1995.

== Track listings ==
- 12-inch single, UK (1994)
1. "Set You Free" (Original Mix)
2. "Set You Free" (Liberation Mix)
3. "Set You Free" (Lost Soul Version)
- CD single, UK (1994)
1. "Set You Free" (Lost Soul Version) – 4:13
2. "Set You Free" (Pop Mix) – 4:05
3. "Set You Free" (Original Edit) – 4:15
4. "Set You Free" (Original Version) – 7:01
5. "Set You Free" (TTF Remix) – 4:53
6. "Set You Free" (Liberation Mix) – 6:39
7. "Set You Free" (Kleptomania Mix) – 5:52
- CD single, Australia & New Zealand (1995)
1. "Set You Free" (Original Radio Edit) – 4:22
2. "Set You Free" (Original Mix) – 7:16
3. "Set You Free" (Amsterdam Mix) – 5:28
4. "Set You Free" (Lost Soul Mix) – 4:12
5. "Set You Free" (Shades of Rhythm Remix) – 6:10
6. "Set You Free" (Liberation Remix) – 6:39
7. "Set You Free" (Acapella (N-Trance Unplugged)) – 1:54
- CD maxi, UK (1995)
1. "Set You Free" (Original Radio Edit) – 4:22
2. "Set You Free" (Original Mix) – 7:16
3. "Set You Free" (Amsterdam Mix) – 5:28
4. "Set You Free" (Lost Soul Mix) – 4:12
5. "Set You Free" (Shades of Rhythm Remix) – 6:10
6. "Set You Free" (Liberation Remix) – 6:39
7. "Set You Free" (N-Trance Unplugged) – 1:54

== Personnel ==
- N-Trance – production, writing
- Kelly Llorenna – vocals
- T-1K – raps (Lost Soul and Pop Mix)
- Tim Russell – engineering

== Charts ==
=== Weekly charts ===
Original version

Chart (1992–1994)	Peak position
Scottish Singles Sales (Official Charts)	13
UK Singles (Official Charts)	39
UK Dance (Official Charts)	36
UK Dance (Music Week) (1993)	25
UK Dance (Music Week) (1994)	9
UK Club Chart (Music Week) (1992)	89
UK Club Chart (Music Week) (1994)	91

Remix

Chart (1995)	Peak position
Australia (ARIA)	11
Austria (Ö3 Austria Top 75)	61
Europe (Eurochart Hot 100)	9
Europe (European Dance Radio)	1
Germany (Media Control Charts)	44
Ireland (IRMA)	4
Israel (Israeli Singles Chart)	2
Netherlands (Dutch Top 40)	8
Netherlands (Single Top 100)	9
Scottish Singles Sales (Official Charts)	2
Sweden (Sverigetopplistan)	15
Switzerland (Schweizer Hitparade)	18
UK Singles (Official Charts)	2
UK Dance (Official Charts)	5
UK Pop Tip Club Chart (Music Week)	3

Chart (2001)	Peak position
Europe (Eurochart Hot 100)	21
Ireland (IRMA)	18
Ireland Dance (IRMA)	1
Romania (Romanian Top 100)	44
Scottish Singles Sales (Official Charts)	3
UK Singles (Official Charts)	4
UK Dance (Official Charts)	4

=== Year-end charts ===
Chart (1995)	Position
Australia (ARIA)	39
Europe (Eurochart Hot 100)	68
Latvia (Latvijas Top 50)	168
Netherlands (Dutch Top 40)	98
Netherlands (Single Top 100)	86
UK Singles (OCC)	17
UK Pop Tip Club Chart (Music Week)	24

Chart (2001)	Position
UK Singles (OCC)	86

== Certifications ==
Region	Certification	Certified units/sales
Australia (ARIA)	Gold	35,000^{^}
United Kingdom (BPI)	2× Platinum	1,200,000^{‡}
^{^} Shipments figures based on certification alone.^{‡} Sales+streaming figures based on certification alone.

== Release history ==
Region	Date	Format(s)	Label(s)	Ref.
United Kingdom	4 October 1993	12-inch vinyl	All Around the World	
Australia	21 February 1994	CD; cassette	Festival; Almighty	
United Kingdom	25 April 1994	12-inch vinyl; CD; cassette	All Around the World	
United Kingdom	2 January 1995	12-inch vinyl; CD; cassette	All Around the World	
Australia	27 February 1995	CD; cassette	All Around the World; Festival	
United States	20 June 1995	Rhythmic contemporary; contemporary hit radio	Critique	
United Kingdom	10 September 2001	12-inch vinyl; CD	All Around the World	

== Cover versions ==
Scottish band Frightened Rabbit included a cover of the song on their 2008 single "Head Rolls Off".

In September 2021, English singer Kyla La Grange covered the song, saying "I wanted to re-work it in a way that brought out the sadness".
