= N-Trance =

British electronic music group

- Also known as: Quartech, State of the Art, Freeloaders
- Origin: Oldham, England
- Genres: Eurodance; house
- Years active: 1990–present
- Labels: PWL / 380 Records (1992–1993); All Around the World (1993–2018)
- Members: Kevin O'Toole
- Past members: Dale Longworth
- Website: n-trance.co.uk

N-Trance (/ˈɛntrɑːns/) are a British electronic music group who were formed by Kevin O'Toole and Dale Longworth in 1990. The group is known for their European hit songs "Set You Free" and "Electronic Pleasure", and their covers of the 1970s disco songs "Stayin' Alive", "D.I.S.C.O.", "Shake Ya Body", and "Da Ya Think I'm Sexy?". They had 14 charting singles in the UK during 1994–2004.

== History ==
=== Early years (1990–1993) ===
Kevin O'Toole and Dale Longworth formed N-Trance in 1990, after meeting at Oldham College in Greater Manchester, where they were both studying sound engineering. They were signed by Pete Waterman's 380 Records (a sub-label of PWL). Vocalist Kelly Llorenna joined around a year later, and sang on their first song, "Set You Free", recorded at Revolution Studios in Cheadle Hulme in July 1992. It was not released as a single and N-Trance bought out their contract with 380 Records. They then signed to a new label, All Around the World in September 1993.

By this point, N-Trance had developed their live shows and were gaining popularity. On their new label, "Set You Free" was released as a single in 1993, rising to No. 82 in the charts.

=== Breakthrough (1994–1996) ===
In 1994, "Set You Free" was re-released achieving a higher chart position of No. 39. N-Trance's next single was a Eurodance song called "Turn Up the Power", the radio mix and official single included vocals from Viveen Wray, and a rap by T-1K. This song peaked at No. 23.

After a number of years performing live over the UK, N-Trance's popularity and the reception towards "Set You Free" had increased significantly. The song was re-released again in 1995 and became a major hit, reaching No. 2 in the charts and being certified Platinum in the UK, after selling over 600,000 copies. The single was also released in other European countries and Australia.

The group recorded their first full-length album, Electronic Pleasure, in November 1995, which featured seven vocalists including David Grant, Viveen Wray, and musicians such as Vinny Burns and Snake Davis.

Their next single, a cover of the Bee Gees hit "Stayin' Alive", was not only a massive international hit, but also introduced a more well known vocalist and producer who would help define N-Trance's sound in the future, Ricardo da Force, former rapper and producer with The KLF. Upon its release in the UK, it debuted at No. 2 and internationally it became one of the biggest UK exports of 1995, reaching No. 1 in Australia and being top 5 in a number of European charts.

=== Second album (1997–1999) ===
Their second full-length album, Happy Hour, was released in 1999.

Singles from the album included cover versions of Rod Stewart's "Da Ya Think I'm Sexy?" (number 7 in October 1997) and Ottawan's "D.I.S.C.O." (number 11 in May 1997), both songs with vocals by Kelly Llorenna, and the latter including rapping by Ricardo da Force. Llorenna also sang on the hardcore techno song "The Mind of the Machine" which had spoken word portions by actor Steven Berkoff; the song reached number 15. Wray sang with Gary Crowley on "Paradise City" which also had a rap section by da Force; the single hit number 28 in September 1998.

=== Third album ===
In February 2009, the group released The Mind of the Machine as their third album. Two new tracks ("Free Running" and "The Earth Is Dying") were recorded to go with the recordings previously made in 1997. The album was released as digital download only.

== Other projects ==
- From 2005 to 2006, the founders of N-Trance, Kevin O'Toole and Dale Longworth, reached No. 9 in the UK Singles Charts with their single, "So Much Love to Give", released using the alias of the Freeloaders. They also released an album Freshly Squeezed on digital download.

== Discography ==
- Electronic Pleasure (1995)
- Happy Hour (1998)
- The Mind of the Machine (2009)
