= Aie a Mwana =

1971 song by Daniel Vangarde and Jean Kluger

"Aie a Mwana" is a song originally written by the French-Belgian writing and production team of Daniel Vangarde and Jean Kluger.

It was first recorded in 1971 under the title "Aieaoa" on the album Le Monde fabuleux des Yamasuki. In 1975, a version with predominantly Swahili lyrics by Black Blood, an African group recording in Belgium, was released as "A.I.E. (A Mwana)". The Swahili version also appeared in a football video game, Pro Evolution Soccer 2011. In 1981, "Aie a Mwana" became the first single released by English group Bananarama. In 2010, with an identical melody but new lyrics and released as "Helele", it became an official song for the 2010 FIFA World Cup, in a version by Velile and Safri Duo.

== Origins of the song and other early versions ==
The original song was called "Aieaoa", and was featured on the pseudo-Japanese dance album Le Monde fabuleux des Yamasuki, which was released in 1971 by the French writing and production team of Daniel Vangarde and Jean Kluger.

In 1975, Belgian record producer Michel Jaspar – who had been born in what was then the Belgian Congo – was contacted by Zairean singer Steve Banda Kalenga, who had formed a band with friends from Angola. Jaspar renamed the band Black Blood and, with fellow musician Ralph Benatar and with the encouragement of Kluger, produced the band's first single in Belgium. The A-side was "Marie Therese", written by Jaspar, and the B-side was a version of "Aieaoa" which Jaspar re-wrote with lyrics in Swahili, apart from the words "Aie a Mwana" themselves which are meaningless. It was the B-side, "A.I.E. (A Mwana)", which became successful, reaching #1 in Belgium and France, as well as being a hit in other parts of the world.

After Bananarama's success in the UK with their version of the song, Vangarde and Kluger, who by then had found international success with the Gibson Brothers and Ottawan, also recorded versions of the same song with both Ottawan ("A.I.E. Is My Song", with English lyrics, 1982) and La Compagnie Créole ("A.I.E A Moun'la", 1987).

== Bananarama version ==
"Aie a Mwana"

Single by Bananarama

from the album Deep Sea Skiving
- B-side: "Dubwana"
- Released: September 28, 1981
- Recorded: June 1981
- Genre: Post-punk; new wave; Afrobeat
- Length: 3:33
- Label: Demon; Deram
- Songwriters: Daniel Vangarde; Jean Kluger
- Producers: Paul Cook; John Martin; Sara Dallin

Bananarama singles chronology
"Aie a Mwana" (1981)	"It Ain't What You Do" (1982)

"Aie a Mwana" is the debut single by Bananarama, released in 1981. Group members originally recorded the track as a demo and ultimately it was the demo version that was pressed onto the record. Originally released as a stand-alone single, "Aie a Mwana" was eventually added to the group's debut album Deep Sea Skiving in a remixed and more polished version two years later.

Bananarama's previous experience in a recording studio was recording unused background vocals for the Department S B-side "Solid Gold Easy Action", a T. Rex cover. Prompted by friend and early supporter Paul Cook (of Sex Pistols), Bananarama decided to release their own single. As they had been including several cover versions in their repertoire (including later hit "Venus"), they decided on the song which had been recorded by Black Blood, sung in Swahili, which they had heard in a French disco. Group members Sara Dallin, Siobhan Fahey and Keren Woodward had to learn to sing the song phonetically. The "tropical" nature of the single inspired the group's name: banana coming from the vibe of "Aie a Mwana" and -rama added to the end as a nod to an early Roxy Music song called "Pyjamarama".

The single was issued by the independent label Demon Records and then licensed to Deram, when Bananarama signed to London, however both times the song failed to reach the UK top 75. Write-ups in the English music and fashion press (NME, The Face) caught the attention of Terry Hall, who invited Bananarama to sing on his new vocal group Fun Boy Three's next single.

=== Track listings ===
7" vinyl single (Demon Records D 1010, later Demon / Deram Records DM 446)

1. "Aie a Mwana" – 3:33
2. "Dubwana" – 3:38

UK 12" vinyl single (Demon / Deram Records DMX 446)

1. "Aie a Mwana" (12" version) – 5:39
2. "Dubwana" – 3:38

US 12" vinyl single

1. "Aie a Mwana" (US extended version) – 6:52
2. "Dubwana" – 3:38

All above tracks available on the 2013 2CD/DVD re-issue of Deep Sea Skiving (Edsel Records EDSG 8029)

=== Charts ===
Chart (1981)	Peak position
U.S. Hot Dance Club Play	66

== Later recordings ==
Greek singer Lakis Giordanelli released a version known as "Agorazo Palia" ("Αγοράζω Παλιά", "I am buying old things") in 1976 with different lyrics. A re-translated version was titled "La Revancha de Macumba" by Veronica Castro for her 1991 album Mi Pequena Soledad.

== "Helele" by Velile and Safri Duo ==
The song was re-recorded in 2010 by the South African singer Velile Mchunu and Danish percussion duo Safri Duo. It was released on 7 May 2010 as the lead single from Safri Duo's forthcoming Greatest Hits album. The song is the official trailer song for the 2010 FIFA World Cup broadcast on German television channel RTL and Switzerland's Schweizer Fernsehen and Télévision Suisse Romande in June–July. "Helele" peaked at number one in Switzerland, at number three in Germany and at number twenty-two in Austria.
