= List of number-one hits of 2010 (Switzerland) =

This is a list of the Swiss Hitparade number ones of 2010.

== Swiss charts ==
Issue date	Song	Artist	Album	Artist
3 January	"Monday Morning"	Melanie Fiona	The Element of Freedom	Alicia Keys
10 January	"Monday Morning"	Melanie Fiona	The Fame	Lady Gaga
17 January	"Russian Roulette"	Rihanna	The Fame	Lady Gaga
24 January	"Tik Tok"	Kesha	The Fame	Lady Gaga
31 January	"Tik Tok"	Kesha	The Fame	Lady Gaga
7 February	"Tik Tok"	Kesha	The Fame	Lady Gaga
14 February	"Tik Tok"	Kesha	The Fame	Lady Gaga
21 February	"Tik Tok"	Kesha	Soldier of Love	Sade
28 February	"Tik Tok"	Kesha	Small Lights In The Dark	Lunik
7 March	"Tik Tok"	Kesha	Small Lights In The Dark	Lunik
14 March	"Replay"	Iyaz	Hoodoo	Krokus
21 March	"Tik Tok"	Kesha	A Curious Thing	Amy Macdonald
28 March	"Tik Tok"	Kesha	A Curious Thing	Amy Macdonald
4 April	"Alors on danse"	Stromae	A Curious Thing	Amy Macdonald
11 April	"Alors on danse"	Stromae	1983	Sophie Hunger
18 April	"Alors on danse"	Stromae	A Curious Thing	Amy Macdonald
25 April	"Alors on danse"	Stromae	A Curious Thing	Amy Macdonald
2 May	"Don't Believe"	Mehrzad Marashi	Iron Man 2 (Soundtrack)	AC/DC
9 May	"Alors on danse"	Stromae	HomeRekords	Züri West
16 May	"Break Your Heart"	Taio Cruz featuring Ludacris	Iron Man 2 (Soundtrack)	AC/DC
23 May	"Wavin' Flag"	K'naan	2010	DJ Antoine
30 May	"Wavin' Flag"	K'naan	Für dich immer noch Fanta Sie	Die Fantastischen Vier
6 June	"Wavin' Flag"	K'naan	The House	Katie Melua
13 June	"Satellite"	Lena	To the Sea	Jack Johnson
20 June	"Wavin' Flag"	K'naan	The House	Katie Melua
27 June	"Waka Waka (This Time for Africa)"	Shakira featuring Freshlyground	The House	Katie Melua
4 July	"Helele"	Velile and Safri Duo	Recovery	Eminem
11 July	"Helele"	Velile and Safri Duo	Recovery	Eminem
18 July	"Waka Waka (This Time for Africa)"	Shakira featuring Freshlyground	Recovery	Eminem
25 July	"Waka Waka (This Time for Africa)"	Shakira featuring Freshlyground	Recovery	Eminem
1 August	"Waka Waka (This Time for Africa)"	Shakira featuring Freshlyground	Recovery	Eminem
8 August	"We No Speak Americano"	Yolanda Be Cool and DCUP	Recovery	Eminem
15 August	"We No Speak Americano"	Yolanda Be Cool and DCUP	Recovery	Eminem
22 August	"We No Speak Americano"	Yolanda Be Cool and DCUP	Recovery	Eminem
29 August	"We No Speak Americano"	Yolanda Be Cool and DCUP	The Final Frontier	Iron Maiden
5 September	"We No Speak Americano"	Yolanda Be Cool and DCUP	Recovery	Eminem
12 September	"Legändä & Heldä"	Bligg	The Greatest Hits Sessions	The Bellamy Brothers & Gölä
19 September	"Love the Way You Lie"	Eminem featuring Rihanna	The Greatest Hits Sessions	The Bellamy Brothers & Gölä
26 September	"Love the Way You Lie"	Eminem featuring Rihanna	A Thousand Suns	Linkin Park
3 October	"Love the Way You Lie"	Eminem featuring Rihanna	The Greatest Hits Sessions	Bellamy Brothers & Gölä
10 October	"Love the Way You Lie"	Eminem featuring Rihanna	The Greatest Hits Sessions	Bellamy Brothers & Gölä
17 October	"Love the Way You Lie"	Eminem featuring Rihanna	The Greatest Hits Sessions	Bellamy Brothers & Gölä
24 October	"Heaven"	Gotthard	The Greatest Hits Sessions	Bellamy Brothers & Gölä
31 October	"Loca"	Shakira featuring El Cata	Come Around Sundown	Kings of Leon
7 November	"Stay the Night"	James Blunt	Bart aber herzlich	Bligg
14 November	"Loca"	Shakira featuring El Cata	Bart aber herzlich	Bligg
21 November	"Loca"	Shakira featuring El Cata	Some Kind of Trouble	James Blunt
28 November	"Loca"	Shakira featuring El Cata	Loud	Rihanna
5 December	"Barbra Streisand"	Duck Sauce	Bart aber herzlich	Bligg
12 December	"Barbra Streisand"	Duck Sauce	Heaven – Best of Ballads Part 2	Gotthard
19 December	"The Time (Dirty Bit)"	The Black Eyed Peas	Neui Wält	Baschi
26 December	"The Time (Dirty Bit)"	The Black Eyed Peas	Heaven – Best of Ballads Part 2	Gotthard

=== Year-end charts ===
==== Singles ====
#	Artist	Title	Peak
1	Shakira featuring Freshlyground	"Waka Waka (This Time for Africa)"	1
2	Yolanda Be Cool & DCUP	"We No Speak Americano"	1
3	Eminem featuring Rihanna	"Love the Way You Lie"	1
4	K'naan	"Wavin' Flag"	1
5	Stromae	"Alors on danse"	1
6	Kesha	"Tik Tok"	1
7	Edward Maya featuring Vika Jigulina	"Stereo Love"	2
8	Lady Gaga	"Alejandro"	3
9	Taio Cruz featuring Ludacris	"Break Your Heart"	1
10	Jay-Z featuring Alicia Keys	"Empire State of Mind"	4

== Romandie charts ==
Issue date	Song	Artist	Album	Artist
3 January	"Russian Roulette"	Rihanna	I Dreamed a Dream	Susan Boyle
10 January	"Russian Roulette"	Rihanna	The Fame	Lady Gaga
17 January	"Russian Roulette"	Rihanna	The Fame	Lady Gaga
24 January	"Tik Tok"	Ke$ha	The Fame	Lady Gaga
31 January	"Stereo Love"	Edward Maya & Vika Jigulina	The E.N.D.	The Black Eyed Peas
7 February	"Stereo Love"	Edward Maya & Vika Jigulina	The E.N.D.	The Black Eyed Peas
14 February	"Stereo Love"	Edward Maya & Vika Jigulina	The E.N.D.	The Black Eyed Peas
21 February	"Tik Tok"	Ke$ha	Heligoland	Massive Attack
28 February	"Tik Tok"	Ke$ha	Soldier of Love	Sade
7 March	"Tik Tok"	Ke$ha	Soldier of Love	Sade
14 March	"Stereo Love"	Edward Maya & Vika Jigulina	Soldier of Love	Sade
21 March	"Replay"	Iyaz	A Curious Thing	Amy Macdonald
28 March	"Stereo Love"	Edward Maya & Vika Jigulina	La crise de nerfs!	Les Enfoirés
4 April	"Alors on danse"	Stromae	On trace la route	Christophe Maé
11 April	"Alors on danse"	Stromae	On trace la route	Christophe Maé
18 April	"Alors on danse"	Stromae	On trace la route	Christophe Maé
25 April	"Alors on danse"	Stromae	On trace la route	Christophe Maé
2 May	"Alors on danse"	Stromae	Tango 3.0	Gotan Project
9 May	"Break Your Heart"	Taio Cruz featuring Ludacris	Tango 3.0	Gotan Project
16 May	"Break Your Heart"	Taio Cruz featuring Ludacris	Tango 3.0	Gotan Project
23 May	"Break Your Heart"	Taio Cruz featuring Ludacris	Tango 3.0	Gotan Project
30 May	"Break Your Heart"	Taio Cruz featuring Ludacris	The Fame	Lady Gaga
6 June	"Break Your Heart"	Taio Cruz featuring Ludacris	The House	Katie Melua
13 June	"Satellite"	Lena	To the Sea	Jack Johnson
20 June	"Wavin' Flag"	K'naan	Blood Like Lemonade	Morcheeba
27 June	"Waka Waka (This Time for Africa)"	Shakira featuring Freshlyground	Zaz	Zaz
4 July	"Waka Waka (This Time for Africa)"	Shakira featuring Freshlyground	Recovery	Eminem
11 July	"Waka Waka (This Time for Africa)"	Shakira featuring Freshlyground	Recovery	Eminem
18 July	"Waka Waka (This Time for Africa)"	Shakira featuring Freshlyground	Zaz	Zaz
25 July	"Waka Waka (This Time for Africa)"	Shakira featuring Freshlyground	Zaz	Zaz
1 August	"Waka Waka (This Time for Africa)"	Shakira featuring Freshlyground	Zaz	Zaz
8 August	"Waka Waka (This Time for Africa)"	Shakira featuring Freshlyground	Zaz	Zaz
15 August	"We No Speak Americano"	Yolanda Be Cool & DCUP	The Suburbs	Arcade Fire
22 August	"We No Speak Americano"	Yolanda Be Cool & DCUP	Zaz	Zaz
29 August	"We No Speak Americano"	Yolanda Be Cool & DCUP	The Final Frontier	Iron Maiden
5 September	"We No Speak Americano"	Yolanda Be Cool & DCUP	Frontières	Yannick Noah
12 September	"We No Speak Americano"	Yolanda Be Cool & DCUP	Frontières	Yannick Noah
19 September	"Love the Way You Lie"	Eminem featuring Rihanna	Frontières	Yannick Noah
26 September	"Love the Way You Lie"	Eminem featuring Rihanna	A Thousand Suns	Linkin Park
3 October	"Love the Way You Lie"	Eminem featuring Rihanna	A Thousand Suns	Linkin Park
10 October	"Love the Way You Lie"	Eminem featuring Rihanna	Pacific 231	Raphaël
17 October	"Love the Way You Lie"	Eminem featuring Rihanna	Pacific 231	Raphaël
24 October	"Loca"	Shakira featuring El Cata	Pacific 231	Raphaël
31 October	"Loca"	Shakira featuring El Cata	Sale el Sol	Shakira
7 November	"Loca"	Shakira featuring El Cata	Sale el Sol	Shakira
14 November	"Loca"	Shakira featuring El Cata	Sale el Sol	Shakira
21 November	"Loca"	Shakira featuring El Cata	Sale el Sol	Shakira
28 November	"Loca"	Shakira featuring El Cata	Loud	Rihanna
5 December	"Barbra Streisand"	Duck Sauce	Le Même Soleil	Grégoire
12 December	"The Time (Dirty Bit)"	The Black Eyed Peas	The Beginning	The Black Eyed Peas
19 December	"The Time (Dirty Bit)"	The Black Eyed Peas	Bleu Noir	Mylène Farmer
26 December	"The Time (Dirty Bit)"	The Black Eyed Peas	Le meilleur des Enfoirés – 20 ans	Les Enfoirés
