= Makera Assada =

Makera Assada is among the areas that form the town of Sokoto state of Nigeria. The area is part of Magajin Gari Ward in the southern part of Sokoto North local government area of Sokoto state, bordered Gidan Haki in the east, Digyar Agyare in the west, Mafara in the north and Helele in the south.

== Etymology ==
According to oral sources Makera Assada was formerly known as Makerar Dutsi. The word Makera is a Hausa name for smithery. The area is known for its blacksmithing, which happened to be the main occupation of the area, the area thus became known as Makera.

On the other hand, the reason why the area is associated with Dutsen Assada, is that in the neighboring area, at the southern part is the place popularly known as Dutsin Assada which extended up to the river of Dundaye. This area is a hilly area with small and flat rocks. There were people who were said to have settled in the place, although the region is not suitable for agriculture people happened to settle there. At that early time, around the 1880s after the formation of Sokoto, Assada was said to be one of the most important personalities who settled near the Dutsi, and he consistently stopped children from climbing it. Consequently, people started calling the place Dutsin Assada.

Assada was very popular in the area; very kind and friendly, he was said to be among the close friends of the sultan and even used to receive sultan visitors in his residence. His house was like gidan baki or guest house.

The reason why Assada is added as a suffix to Makera is to differentiate it from other areas known for blacksmithing. The other places where smithing occurred included: Kofar-Rini the area that specialized in white metal smithing producing earrings and necklaces. There is also Makera in Nupawa that produces hoes and other farming tools. But in Makera Assada all types of smithing take place. This explains why Assada is the home of Sarkin Makeran Sarkin Musulmi, or the chief smith of the sultan of Sokoto.

== Origin of the people of Makera Assada ==
The origin of the people of Makera Assada is not clear. No one knows the exact date of settlement. But it is assured that the people settled after the Jihad of Shehu Usmanu Danfodiyo in the nineteenth century, when Sokoto was founded. The coming of immigrants played an important role in the history and the growth of the area. These immigrants include the blacksmiths from Zamfara who were also Fulani under the leadership of Muhammad Andi and his brother Ahmad Maigeme.

The time Shehu Usmanu Danfodiyo started his teaching and preaching in his home town Degel, and after some time he went out on preaching tours. His first tour was to Kebbi from where he gained his first converts. The Uthman and his assistants, including his younger brother Abdullahi ibn Fodiyo, made for Zamfara where they remained and preached for five years.

His preaching influenced many people from different parts of west Africa. Very soon interested people who were influenced by his preaching continued to form part of the Jama`at, as his followers were known. The people included both the Fulani, his race, and Hausa since Shehu Usmanu preached both in Hausa and Fulfulde languages. Many more people form his fold, and the community grew still further in fame both in and out of Hausaland.

Muhammad Andi and his brother Ahmad Maigeme, together with their people left Zamfara in order to join Shehu who had migrated to Gudu and possibly the Jihad that was going on. Mallam Bello stated that “when the Muhammad Andi and his people left Zamfara they met Shehu Usmanu Danfodiyo when the Jihad was going on and even participated in the Great Battle of Alkalawa.

According to oral sources Muhammad Andi and his people were Fulanis from Zamfara. Their chief occupation was blacksmithing. These people were ill-treated before they left their home Zamfara, because of their belief in Shehu's preaching. The Hausa rulers feared that their subjects would revolt against them. Seeing this, the Hausa rulers were alarmed. They saw the growing number of his following and the hold that Islam had gained. Men urged them on saying “if you do not disperse this concourse of people, your power will be gone; they will destroy your country by causing all the people to leave you and go to them.” When Sarki Nafata was the King of Gobir, he forbade any man from holding religious meetings and preaching to the people, excepting only Shehu. Secondly, he decreed that Islam might only be practiced by those who inherited the creed from their fathers, and he also prohibited the wearing of turbans by men and veils by women. These edicts were proclaimed in every marketplace in Gobir and the neighboring parts of Adar and Zamfara which were under Gobir domination. With these we can see that the jama`at of Shehu Usmanu and other followers in different places most especially in Hausaland shared the same fate. Consequently, the people of Muhammad Andi who were in Zamfara had no choice but to migrate and follow Shehu wherever he was.

On their migration the Hausa rulers tried to stop them from following Shehu. In order to escape from their threats, the people of Andi complained to them, that they were only blacksmiths, on their way for business activities. As each opened their luggage, it was discovered that it contained blacksmiths tools, and therefore allowed them to pass.

These people were welcomed by the Shehu and his Jama`at, especially because of their profession. This people remained with the Jama`at of Shehu Usmanu Danfodiyo and participated in the Jihad of Hausaland. The people of Muhammad Andi continued with their profession there by producing war tools and weapons for the Jihadists. During the war time they produced swords, spears, arrows, handmade guns, helmets, shields and other materials worn by horses.

After the Jihad of Hausaland following the creation of the Sokoto caliphate by Shehu Usmanu and his son also War Commander Muhammad Bello, they came together with their followers, scholars, friends, relatives and other participants of the Jihad. These people were given a portion of land to settle with their people. Muhammad Andi was therefore one of the beneficiaries, being the first to settle at present Makera Assada. Shehu ordered Muhammad Andi to go round and look for a convenient place for him to stay, and when he found the area (Makera Assada) he informed Shehu Usmanu dan Fodiyo, Shehu therefore blessed the land. According to oral sources Shehu wanted Muhammad Andi to stay near Hubbare but Andi complained that by nature of their blacksmith occupation and also a kind of animal husbandry, it was better for them to settle far away from the centre of the town.

After some years another important personality arrived at the newly established Makera with the members of his family. This person is popularly known as Sharif Muhammad Al-gudana. He was with some other people. Algudana and his people were Adarawas. Adarawa are found in Tamaske, Buza and Adar region in Tawa, Niger Republic. They are also found in Illela in Sokoto.

As a result of the Jihad of Shehu dan Fodiyo in the 19th century, the Sarkin Adar Mustaphata and his son Muhammad Dan Almustapha and also Ahmad Bida visited Shehu Danfodiyo when he was in Gudu, but Mustapha left Ahmad Bida and Muhammad with Shehu. Hamidun, who succeeded to the throne of Sarkin Adar during the Jihad of Danfodiyo sided with Gobirawa until 1809, when Sarkin Azbin Muhammad Gemma, who succeeded Al-Bakri, took Sarkin Adar Hamidun with him to Shehu at Sifawa and Sarkin Adar made his submission. He died soon after that. Ahmad Bida was said to have stayed at Dundaye as the Sarkin Adar of Dundaye. Thus was born the dynasty of Adarawa at Dundaye. Ibid

We can see from the above account that during the Jihad, Adarawa participated in it and after, some of them stayed at Dundaye and spread in different parts of Sokoto in search of business activities. But some of them returned to Niger Republic under Muhammad dan Al-Mustapha, who prepared to remain in Adar with the hope of regaining to his throne.

When these people settled in the area, they practiced leather work. They produced all kinds of leather materials like shoes, leather bags, royal pillows, etc., but these people did not become popular in leather work as most of them adopted the occupation of their host, blacksmithing.

== Occupations ==
As many people continued to stay in the area, the major economic activity of the people had been blacksmithing, which was dominant in the area, the people having been engaged in various types of gainful employment. The people of the area engaged in all forms of smithing and other iron work. Both blacksmithing and white smithing is practiced in the area. Blacksmithing has been practiced since the establishment of the region after the jihad of Shehu Usmanu. The people of the region used to regard blacksmithing as a compulsory occupation of every member of the area. They regard those who abandoned their grandfather's occupation as committing a serious offence.

The act of smithing provides income for the people of the area, as the blacksmith produces house utensils, farming tools, weapons, etc. On the other hand, those who specialized in smithing of the white iron or Makeran fari, produces decorations for women, thereby producing necklaces, earrings, handrings, etc. The white smiths are very few in the area thus blacksmithing or Makeran Baki are regarded as their masters.

Apart from smithing, the Hausa people were noted for their active participation in commercial activities. Some people in the region engaged in internal trade (Kasuwanci). This was especially the case with merchants with small scale capital. They sold the goods produce in the area in villages and towns. Farming had been the preoccupation of most African society, which was extensively done during the rainy season. In this area (Makera Assada), there are people who engage in farming, these people mostly have their farmland at the riverside along Dundaye and Kofar Kware areas, mostly farming in small scale.

In other sector of the economy in the area, there are also people who engaged in the production of mats. The Major material in this manufacturing sector is wild dump palm tree and rubber. This industry was not the monopoly of either men or women. Both men and women engage in the manufacturing of mats or carpets, Wundaye and Tabarmi.

However we should not forget the contribution of women of this region towards economic activities. Some of them engage in the economic sector. The role of women as commission agents (Dillalai), just like members of the more formal stock exchange market, the old women actively engaged in serving as commissioned agents (Dillalai). This was because only the older women were allowed to go out of their homes. They also used to move from house to house looking for items to sell. For instance, they used to engage in large scale trade in thread that was also manufactured at home by the women. They used to collect these home-made products either as commission agent or as through direct purchases. These women also engaged in the sale of newly produced and second hand clothes. They also sold food items both in and outside their homes. People of all age groups use to buy these items. The women fetched a lot of income to these women manufactures and sellers.

The activities of commissioned agents were strengthened because of the nature and social attitudes and values in Sakkwato. Thus is against Islamic law for married women to go up and down anyhow especially in the market places. Thus the commercial agents provides most of the items needed for them. Another economic sector where women provided their contribution which is closely related to the agricultural sector, is the food and catering industry. Their services in this industry are not limited to the production of food for family consumption. They also processed and cooked different types of food for sale outside the family. Among the solid food they cooked Tuwo made of rice (Tuwon shinkafa), corn or Maize etc., Masa round cake of flour, Bula etc. The morning drink such as Kunu, Koko and the Fura which are extensively consumed during the summer season and different types of snacks, such as Kosan Rogo, Wake Awara etc. These were all prepared by women at home for family consumption as well for sale.

Groundnut was widely produced in Hausaland, the women of the area use groundnuts to produce many different items for both family consumption and for sale. The shell of ground nuts for instance was ground into seed powder form to make bran (Dussa), which was used to feed cows and sheep. The groundnut kernel was press and oil extracted. This oil was used in the olden days as fuel (paraffin or kerosene) as well as for food. The solid part of the groundnut kernel was made into groundnut cake, (Kuli Kuli) and put to many uses more especially in making fast food “Datu” and as cake snacks.

There are also some women of the area that specialized in producing local sauce or “Daddawa” important ingredient in making soup, local sauce has blocked the success of such modern market favourites as maggi cube, or Ajini-moto. Majority of the people especially who live in the local areas rely on local sauce. Perhaps this is why the Nigerian food and beverages company decided to come out with a new brand name for modern sauce based called Daddawa cubes.

In the weaving industry, women along with the men engaged also in making of Kwaddo and Linzami. These are decorations done on the men closing. There were also some who engaged in the manufacture of multi colored caps (Kube). Among the artistic works of the women folk was the design on bedsheets (Zanen Gado) pillow cases and mattresses. Skilled women in their home did these. There were also the existence of mini-market which served the immediate needs of the people in the area. The market which is known as Kasuwar Bayangida opens in the evening time till late in the night.

=== Blacksmithing in Makera Assada ===
Makera Assada since its establishment as one of the commercial centers of Sokoto town, was known for its blacksmithing (Kira).

It is sometime hard to imagine today, an age where people use their surrounding environment as the only source for survival. At the very rise of African civilization the essential tools to survival were found through the use of wood and stone tools. These tools proved to work well enough for hunting and farming, but as time changed and mankind evolved, it became necessary to find more efficient means of survival.

The first known iron working exists in Turkey and the age of metals such as gold, copper, silver, lead and iron were not made workable until approximately 400 BC. This development slowed until around 1500 BC, with the development of furnaces capable of forging iron tools. The era of Iron had begun and the art of blacksmith soon spread throughout western Africa.

Blacksmithing began with the Iron Age, when primitive man first began making tools from iron. The Iron Age began when some primitive person noticed that a certain type of rock yielded iron, when heated by the coals of a very hot campfire. In short, we can say that blacksmithing the art of crafting that crude metal into a usable implement, has been around for a long time.

In Nigeria, the NOK people, shows the art of blacksmiths, which dates back to the sixth century BC. These Nigerian metal workers developed a technology that gave them the upper hand in life, and would prove to be a technology to revolutionise the world. Clapperton writing in 1824, spoke about iron working in Sokoto and even claimed that all the city blacksmiths were Nupes. At any rate, Nupes preponderance in the Iron working industry is probably exaggerated by Clapperton. No doubt, many skilled iron workers came to Sokoto because they were attracted by its development in terms of settlement. Other skilled iron workers no doubt came into the city as refugees (Al-kalawa), as slaves sent in from the emirates or by the demand of skilled hands in Sokoto itself. In the previous chapters we saw the coming of Muhammad Andi and his men from Zamfara marked the beginning of blacksmithing industry in Makera. Zamfara for long is noted for its blacksmithing.

==== Roles of the blacksmiths in Sokoto ====
Before the coming of Europeans, Makera Assada was one of the developed areas in Sokoto town. It has been observed that most of the development that occurred to her was a result of the heavy involvement in blacksmithing and this help the town of Sokoto in general.

Smithing was the major factor that united the people of Magajin Gari ward. This was so because the manufactured goods by the blacksmith was needed within and around the area as most of them engaged in farming. The neighbouring Mafara people were mostly farmers and cattle rearers. This people of Mafara used to purchase the manufactured products of the blacksmith, like the farming tool, house utensils, keys and padlocks, earring, etc. This is to say that while the people of Makera were busy producing needed materials for people their neighbours, Mafara people are helping them exporting their products to various places. The people of Mafara are grand children of Muhammad Sambo, one of the closest friends of Shehu, all so a jihadist and a scholar. There is a kind of intermarriage between the people of Makera and Mafara strengthen their relationship.

The development of in the trade, was as a result of the subsistence economy practiced in the early period of time. As Makera Assada specialized in producing iron products there was also people within and around Sokoto that engage in farming, dying capentary, hunting, etc., as such iron was needed in variety of forms. Spears, arrows, sword, knives. The farmers needed hoes, matches and ploughshares. According to Ibrahim Gandi, one of my informants, contended that hunters and farmers from distance places comes to purchase various implements from the people of Makera.

Pre-colonial blacksmithing Makera society was very efficient, Sarkin Makera Buhari, stated that “Shehu Usmanu Danfodiyo, ordered his son Muhammad Bello to expand Sokoto town”. The area of Assada continues to receive more and more immigrants. The blacksmith of the area is one of the factors of their arrival. Muhammad Bello therefore ordered for the clearance of bush nearby the area up to Kofar-Kware.

Most blacksmiths starts to work when they were young boys, may be age 6 or 7. They would apprentice to a blacksmith, for a decade or more, and then they will set out to start their own shop. If a boy did apprentice to a master, he might spend most of his life in shop before he ever got the opportunity to be a journey man. The people of Assada try to imbibe the knowledge of blacksmithing into every son born in the area. later when western education started taking shape in the area at first the blacksmith did not show interest. It was only those who refuse to trade in smithing, that were sent to school. These categories of boys were sent away so as not to be seen nearby as their sight would be irritating to their parents. But the blacksmiths realized the importance of western education and they put their wards, even the lazy ones. Many people enjoyed the fruits of western education in the area, as some of them became very closer to the government. The government need advice of this kind of people like famous Yahaya Danboko one of the earliest scholars of Sokoto state.

However, the practice of blacksmithing in Makera Assada makes the area to be recognized as the home of blacksmithing. The area was known for its smithing since the establishment of Sokoto town. That is why during the time of Caliph Muhammad Bello, he appointed the Sarkin Makera from the blacksmiths of the area.

By the arrival of the Europeans to Sokoto, whenever they need the service of the blacksmiths they use to contact the sultan. The sultan will however call the Sarkin Makera and Mazugi. The blacksmiths of Assada produces the wrought iron gates for Sokoto prison and the residence of Europeans and other places.

Another important role played by the blacksmiths of Makera Assada was during the jihad of Shehu Danfodiyo. The blacksmith apart from participating in the jihad, they also produce weapons for the jihadists. It is believed that, if the government had taken these kind of local smithing serious, it would not had been spending money and importing farm implement and other iron products from abroad. Iron working made farming, hunting and war more efficient. Iron allowed for greater growth in societies with the ability to support large kingdoms, which spread across western Africa.

==== Process of blacksmithing in Assada ====
Blacksmith is a person who creates objects from iron or steel by “forging” the metal, by using tools to hammer, bend, cut and otherwise shape it in its non liquid form. Usually the metal is heated until it glows red or orange as part of the forging process. Blacksmiths produces things like wrought iron gates, grills, railings, light fixtures, furniture, sculpture, tools agricultural implements, decorative and religious items, cooking utensils and weapons. Blacksmiths work with their old clothes this is because of the nature of the work. They use to work both in their shop (Bukkar Makera), and even at entrance of their houses (Zaure) as the case of Makera Assdada. Except during this time that most of the work use to take place in the market.

Blacksmiths work with black metals, typically iron. The term smith originates from the word ‘smite’ which means to heat. Thus a blacksmith is a person who works or smite black metal. Over the centuries blacksmith had taken little pride in the fact that, theirs is one of the few crafts that allows them to make tools that are used for their craft. Time and tradition had provided some fairly standard basic tools which vary only in detail around the world.

All a smith needs is something to heat the metal, something to hold the hot metal with, something to hit the metal on, and something to hit the metal with.

The tools which blacksmiths need to include. The forge or Tukunya which is place under the ground, forge is a fireplace of the blacksmith's shop. It provides the means to keep and controlled with the help of Mazuzzugi.

Tongs (Awartaki) are used to hold the hot metal. They came in a range of shapes and sizes. Intriguingly, while tongs are needed for a great deal of blacksmithing, much work can be done by mere holding the cold end with one's bare hand. Steel is a fairly poor conductor of heat, and orange hot steel at one end would be cold to the touch a foot or so.

The Anvil (makera) at its simplest is a large block of iron or steel. Over time this has been refined to provide a rounded horn to facilitate drawing and bending, a face for drawing and upsetting and bending and on one or more holes to hold special tools (swages or hardies) and facilitate punching. Often the Flat surface of an anvil will be hardened steel, and the body made from tougher iron.

Blacksmiths hammer (amaleshi) tend to have one face and a peen. The peen is typically either a ball or a blunt wedge (cross or straight peen depending on the orientation of the wedge to the handle) and it is used when drawing. Swage (magagari) this is shaping tool, swages are either stand alone tools or fit the ‘hardie hole’ on the face of anvil. The Blacksmiths work by heating pieces of wrought iron or steel until the metal become soft enough to be shape with hand tools, such as hammer and chisel. To fuel the smelter or the forge, wood is converted to charcoal is use.

The techniques of Blacksmithing may be roughly divided into forging (sometimes called “sculpting”), welding, heat treating and finishing.

Forging is also referred to as sculpting because it is the process of shaping metal. Some of the operations or techniques applied in forging to include drawing, shrinking, bending, upsetting and punching. Drawing can be accomplished with a variety of tools and methods. Two typical methods using only hammer and anvil would be hammering on the anvil horn, and hammering on the anvil face using the cross peen of a hammer. Another method for drawing is to use a tool called a fuller (tsinke), or the peen of the hammer to hasten the drawing out of a thick piece of metal. The technique is called fullering from the tool. Fullering consist of hammering a series of indentations (with corresponding ridge) perpendicular to the long section of the piece being drawn. The resulting effect will be to look somewhat like waves along the top of the piece.

Bending through heating steel to an orange heat allows bending as if the hot steel were clay or sarafy taffy; it takes significant but not Herculean effort. Bending can be done with the hammer over the horn or age of the anvil, or by inserting the work into one of the holes in the top of the anvil and swinging the free end to one side. Bends can be dress and tightened or widened by hammering them over the appropriately shaped part of the anvil.

Upsetting is the process of making metal thicker in one dimension through shortening in the other. One form is by heating the end of a rod and them hammering on its as one would drive a nail, the rods get shorter, and the hot part widens. An alternative to hammering on the hot end, would be to place the hot end on the hot end of the anvil and hammer on the cold end, or to drop the rod, hot end down, onto a piece of settle at floor level.

Punching may be done to create a decorative pattern, or to make a hole, for example, in preparation for making a hammer head, a smith would punch a hole in a heavy bar or rod for the hammer handle. Punching is not limited to depressions and holes. It also includes cutting, slitting and drifting; these are done with a chisel.

The combining process; the five basic forging process are often combined to produce and refine the shapes necessary for finished products. For example, to fashion a cross peen hammer head, a smith would start with a bar roughly the diameter of the hammer face, the handle hole would be punched and drifted (widened by inserting or passing a larger tool through it), the head would be cut (punched, but with a wedge), the peen would be drawn to a wedge and the face would be dressed by upsetting.

Welding is the joining of metal of the same or similar kind such that there is no joint or seam; the pieces to be welded become a single piece. Now the smith moves with rapid purpose. The metal is taken from the fire and quickly brought together, the hammer lightly applying a few taps to bring the mating faces into complete contact and squeeze out the flux and finally return to fire again. The weld was begun with the taps, but often the joint is weak and incomplete, so the smith will again hit the joint to welding temperature and work the weld with light blows to ‘set’ the weld and finally to dress it to shape.

Heat treatment

Other than to increase its malleability, another reason for heating the metal is for heat treatment purposes. The metal can be hardened, tempered, normalized, annealed, case hardened and subject to other process that changes the crystalline structure of the steel to give it specific characteristics required for different uses.

Finishing; Depending on the intended use of the piece a blacksmith, may finish it in a number of Ways. A simple jig that the smith might only use a few times in the shop it may get the minimum of finishing a rap on the anvil to break off scale and a brushing with a wire brush. Files can be employed to bring a piece to final shape, remove burrs and sharp edges, and smooth the surface. Grinding stones abrasive paper and emery wheels can further shape, smooth and polish the surface. Finishes include but are not limited to paint, varnish, bluing, borrowing, oil and wax.

However, blacksmith's striker (mazugi) is an assistant to the blacksmith. His job is to swing a large hammer in heavy forging operations. The Sarkin Makera quoted, “when ever there is any work or if the sultan needs the service of the blacksmiths, he will invite the Sarkin Makera and the Mazugi will be the person to follow him with his tools.

Making an axe or a knife or a fireplace crane, set of door hinges or a handful of nails was what the village smithy did. His shop was the local hardware store. He could also repair a long chain or put rims on the wagon wheels or fix the axe that got chipped when it hit the rock. Whether the village needed swords or plough shares, the blacksmith made them. For without the blacksmith, the village could not survive

As this whole iron industry evolved over time, blacksmithing became an umbrella for several specialisties. The blacksmith who made knives and swords was a bladesmith. The blacksmith who made locks was a locksmith. The blacksmith who maids suits of armour was an armorer. The blacksmith who made gun barrels and triggers was a gunsmith. The blacksmith who shod horses, was a farrier. The blacksmith, who made earrings, necklaces and other decorations for women, was a whitesmith. The blacksmith who specialized in moulding gold was a goldsmith. Thus the blacksmiths possess all these skills.

==== Assessment of the industry ====
Gandi describes the profession of blacksmithing as the main way of life to people of Assada saying that is belief that anybody who hails from the region must be a blacksmith hence it is a taboo for a person to abandon the occupation of his father and grandfathers. In every family of the Makera Assada, there must be an evidence of blacksmithing. This points to the importance of the craft and its antiquity, among the Assada people. The smiths of Makera Assada are always at their smithing shops and work places. Most of the blacksmiths are not farmers, so they do not go to farm but they have good relationship with the farmers who need their services.

Smithing required specialized skills and physical strength, often involving a long period of apprenticeship and specific cultural taboos. Historically, blacksmiths were closely associated with iron and fire, with traditional beliefs sometimes attributing supernatural qualities to their craft.

The blacksmiths offered relief to farming and also supplied technological base. The blacksmiths provides items made necessary by social and day-to-day activities. Since the emergence of blacksmith into western Africa around 1500 BC, they are feared in some western African societies for their powerful skills in metal working, as we mentioned earlier most of the famous blacksmiths, iron weapon and fire cannot harm them, although some consider that as form of magic, but universally revered by West African for their technological pioneering. While common people fear the power of the blacksmith, they are highly admired and hold high social status. Because the trade is so specialized and dangerous, blacksmiths are often requisitioned by towns and villages where there are none.

As such making an axe or a knife or a fireplace crane, bowls (baho) or a set of door hinges are his work. He could also repair door locks or fix the axe that get chipped when it hit a rock. What affected the Makera smiths was the importation of foreign iron wares, large quantities of cheap hardware are now on sale in the local markets. Knives, house utensils like bucket, bowls, necklaces, etc. Door bolts and hinges and other useful materials can be purchased at will anywhere. Formally the people depended for local smith, for the production of these goods. These foreign goods are cheaper and more convenient for its purpose.

Although, the blacksmiths of Makera Assada specialized in all kind of iron work, they did not however, give priority to the production of locally made guns although hunters need them for hunting animals. This is so because of security risk as the government prohibited such production. In other words, local weapons like sword, spears etc. are produced there.

Apart from moulding the iron to produce things, some individuals engage in traveling smith. They travels to many places as far as Kano, Zaria, Funtua and even beyond the borders of northern Nigeria, to buy irons that can be put to use, like damage vehicles and planes, pieces of iron rods, oil tanker's containers and many more. At this metals are brought to Makera Assada until when they are needed any company or individual who want this kind of business or irons will be directed to Makera Assada area.

The occupation diversification among the Makera particularly in their smithing crafts shows their technological prowess and advancement. This was witness during the jihad. In 1839, Henry Wadsworth Longfellow in his famous poem, "The Village Blacksmith" praises the blacksmith, “His brow is wet with honest sweat. He earn whatever he can, and looks the whole world in the face, for he owes not any man.

== See also ==
- Sokoto
- Usman Dan Fodio
- Sokoto Caliphate
- Blacksmiths of western Africa
