= Samb =

Samb is a given name and a surname. Notable people with the name include:

- Samb Mour or Mour Samb (born 1994), Senegalese professional footballer
- Amadou Samb (born 1988), Senegalese footballer
- Cheikh Samb (born 1984), Senegalese former professional basketball player
- Falou Samb (born 1997), Senegalese professional footballer
- Issa Samb (1945–2017), Senegalese painter, sculptor, performance artist, playwright and poet
- Mamadou Samb (born 1989), Senegalese-Spanish professional basketball player
- Massata Samb, Senegalese politician
- N'Diaga Samb (born 1966), Senegalese draughts player based in the Netherlands
- Victor Samb (born 1985), Senegalese footballer
- William Samb (died 2022), Papua New Guinean politician
- Yamar Samb (born 1952), former Senegalese basketball player
- Ababacar Samb Makharam (died 1987), Senegalese actor, screenwriter and film producer

== See also ==
- SAMB F.C., amateur football club based in Malacca, Malaysia
- Samb-Adagio", a song by Danish percussion duo Safri Duo
