= Greatest Hits (Safri Duo album) =

Greatest hits album by Safri Duo
- Released: 21 June 2010
- Label: Universal

Safri Duo chronology
Origins (2008)	Greatest Hits (2010)

Singles from Greatest Hits
- 1. "Helele" Released: 7 May 2010

Greatest Hits is a greatest hits album by Danish percussion duo Safri Duo released on 21 June 2010. It is released nearly ten years after Safri Duo scored an international hit single with "Played-A-Live" in 2001, which became the fourth fastest selling single ever in Europe, selling over 1.5 million copies worldwide. The compilation album contains songs from the duo's three commercial studio albums, Episode II (2001), 3.0 (2003), and Origins (2008). It includes the new song, "Helele", which features South African singer Velile Mchunu, and is the official trailer song for the 2010 FIFA World Cup broadcast on German television channel RTL in June–July. The album peaked at number thirty-two in Germany and twenty-three in Switzerland.

== Track listing ==
No.	Title	Length
1.	"Helele" (featuring Velile)	3:07
2.	"All the People in the World" (featuring Clark Anderson) (from 3.0)	3:41
3.	"Athena" (featuring Soweto Gospel Choir) (from Origins)	4:42
4.	"Samb-Adagio" (from Episode II)	5:57
5.	"Rise (Leave Me Alone)" (featuring Clark Anderson) (from 3.0)	3:53
6.	"Apollo" (from Origins)	3:21
7.	"Fallin' High" (from 3.0)	5:58
8.	"Sweet Freedom (Extended Remix Edition)" (featuring Michael McDonald) (from Episode II)	5:12
9.	"Played-A-Live" (from Episode II)	6:45
10.	"Twilight" (featuring Rolando Villazón and Youssou N'Dour) (from Origins)	4:21
11.	"Baya Baya" (from Episode II)	5:25
12.	"Ritmo de La Noche" (featuring Clark Anderson) (from 3.0)	3:02
13.	"Knock on Wood" (from 3.0)	4:10
14.	"A Visit From the Zoo – Safri Duo Medley ("Baya Baya", "Played-A-Live (The Bongo Song)", "Rise", "Sweet Freedom", "The Moonwalker", "Knock on Wood", "Fallin' High", "All the People in the World", "Ritmo de la Noche")" (from 3.5)	9:45

== Charts ==
Chart (2010)	Peak position
German Albums Chart	32
Swiss Albums Chart	23

== Release history ==
Region	Date	Label	Format
Denmark	21 June 2010	Universal	CD, digital download
Finland	21 June 2010	Universal	CD, digital download
Norway	21 June 2010	Universal	CD, digital download
Sweden	21 June 2010	Universal	CD, digital download
Germany	25 June 2010	Universal	Digital download
Germany	2 July 2010	Universal	CD
