= Episode II (album) =

Studio album by Safri Duo
- Released: 28 May 2001
- Recorded: Safri Duo Studio
- Length: 49:16
- Label: Universal
- Producers: Safri Duo, Michael Parsberg

Safri Duo chronology
Bach to the Future (1998)	Episode II (2001)	3.0 (2003)

Singles from Episode II
- 1. "Played-A-Live" Released: November 2000; 2. "Samb-Adagio" Released: 11 June 2001; 3. "Baya Baya" Released: 5 November 2001; 4. "Sweet Freedom" Released: 10 June 2002

Professional ratings
Review scores
Source	Rating
Allmusic	3/5 stars
GAFFA	3/6 stars

Episode II is the first mainstream studio album by Danish percussion duo Safri Duo, who released six classical albums before its breakthrough with the Michael Parsberg-produced hit "Played-A-Live", the opening track of the album. It was released on May 28, 2001, and reissued in 2002 with two additional tracks, including a cover version of "Sweet Freedom" with vocals by American R&B/soul singer Michael McDonald. Later the same year a Remix Edition of the album was released, which included an additional disc with remixes by artists such as Airscape, Cosmic Gate and Future Breeze.

== Track listing ==
=== First edition ===
No.	Title	Length
1.	"Played-A-Live"	6:46
2.	"Snakefood"	6:04
3.	"A-Gusta"	5:39
4.	"Samb-Adagio"	5:58
5.	"Everything"	6:02
6.	"Everything Epilogue"	2:39
7.	"Crazy Benny"	5:33
8.	"Baya Baya"	5:27
9.	"Adagio"	5:12

=== New Edition ===
No.	Title	Length
1.	"Played-A-Live"	6:46
2.	"Snakefood"	6:04
3.	"A-Gusta"	5:39
4.	"Samb-Adagio"	5:58
5.	"Everything"	6:02
6.	"Everything Epilogue"	2:39
7.	"Sweet Freedom" (feat. Michael McDonald)	3:23
8.	"Crazy Benny"	5:33
9.	"Baya Baya"	5:27
10.	"Adagio"	5:12
11.	"Played-A-Live" (Darude vs. JS16)	7:29

=== The Remix Edition ===
Disc one
No.	Title	Length
1.	"Played-A-Live"	6:45
2.	"Snakefood"	6:03
3.	"A-Gusta"	5:38
4.	"Samb-Adagio"	5:57
5.	"Everything"	6:01
6.	"Everything Epilogue"	2:35
7.	"Sweet Freedom" (feat. Michael McDonald)	3:23
8.	"Crazy Benny"	5:32
9.	"Baya Baya"	5:26
10.	"Adagio"	5:11

Disc two: The Remixes
No.	Title	Length
1.	"Sweet Freedom" (Extended Club Version) (feat. Michael McDonald)	5:09
2.	"Played-A-Live" (Darude vs. JS16)	7:28
3.	"Played-A-Live" (Airscape)	6:53
4.	"Played-A-Live" (Spanish Fly)	9:35
5.	"Samb-Adagio" (Cosmic Gate)	7:41
6.	"Samb-Adagio" (Riva Mix)	7:28
7.	"Baya Baya" (ATFC Dawn Vocal)	8:16
8.	"Baya Baya" (Future Breeze)	8:49
9.	"Everything" (DJ Asle Deep Dub Edit)	7:23

== Charts and certifications ==
=== Weekly charts ===
Chart (2001–03)	Peak position
Austrian Albums (Ö3 Austria)	21
Belgian Albums (Ultratop Flanders)	13
Danish Albums (Hitlisten)	1
Dutch Albums (Album Top 100)	16
Finnish Albums (Suomen virallinen lista)	7
German Albums (Offizielle Top 100)	2
Hungarian Albums (MAHASZ)	19
Norwegian Albums (VG-lista)	9
Portuguese Albums (AFP)	14
Swedish Albums (Sverigetopplistan)	49
Swiss Albums (Schweizer Hitparade)	2

=== Year-end charts ===
Chart (2001)	Position
German Albums (Offizielle Top 100)	23
Swiss Albums (Schweizer Hitparade)	23

== Certifications ==
Region	Certification	Certified units/sales
Denmark (IFPI Danmark)	3× Platinum	150,000^{^}
Germany (BVMI)	Gold	150,000^{^}
Spain (Promusicae)	Gold	50,000^{^}
Switzerland (IFPI Switzerland)	Platinum	40,000^{^}
^{^} Shipments figures based on certification alone.
