= Velile =

South African singer and actress

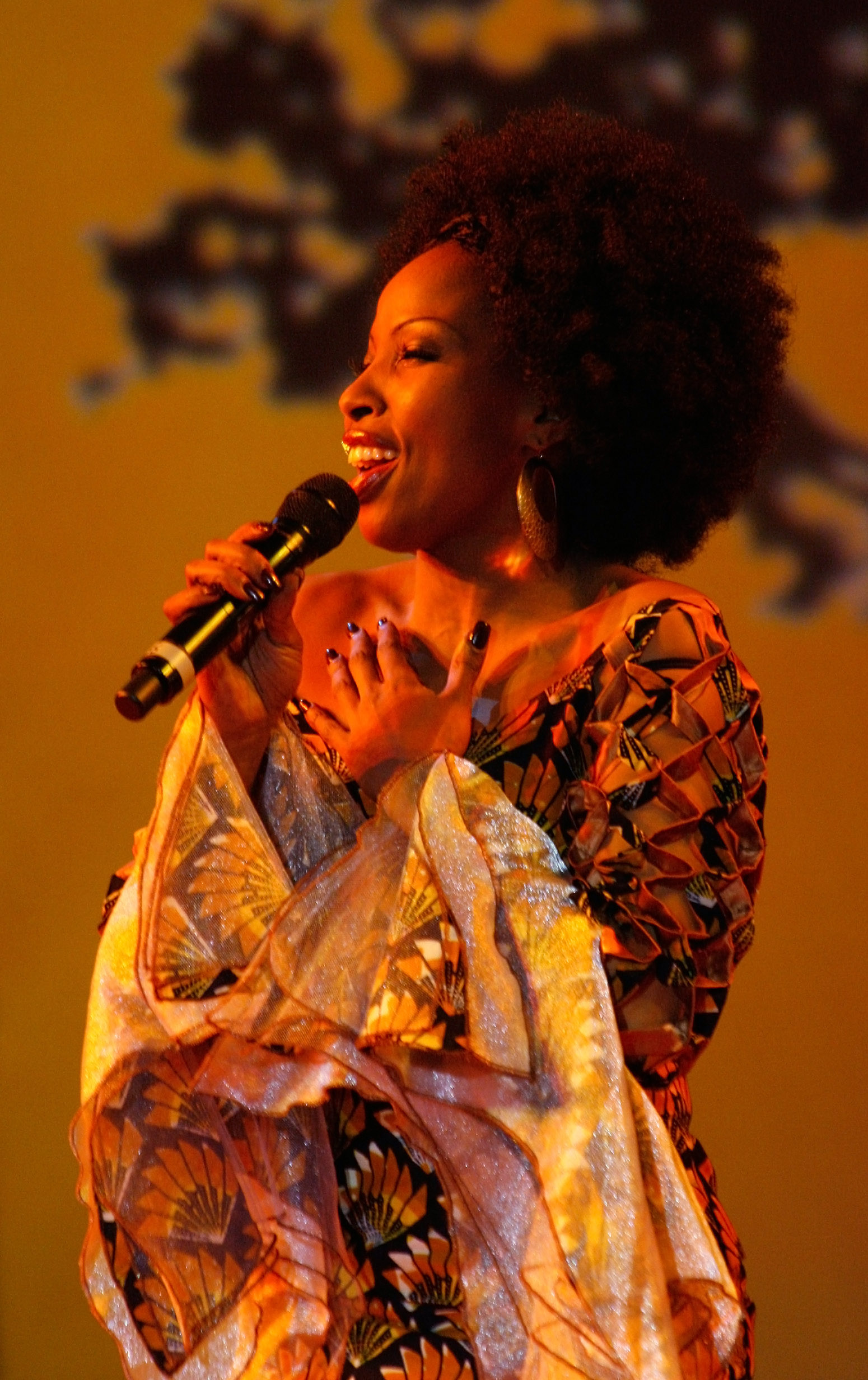
- Velile at the presentation of the Austrian Sportspersonalities of the Year 2010

Background information
- Born: Velile Mchunu; 1973 (age 52–53); KwaMashu, Natal, South Africa
- Genres: Pop
- Occupations: Singer, actress

Velile (born Velile Mchunu in 1973 in KwaMashu, Natal, South Africa) is a South African pop singer and musical actress. She became known in particular through the song "Helele", which was used by RTL (French radio) and the Swiss television in the coverage of the Football World Cup 2010 in South Africa, and in Germany as the leading actress in the Hamburg production of the musical The Lion King.

== Biography ==
Mchunu grew up in a township near the South African city of Durban and attended drama school at the "Committed Artist Academy" in Johannesburg. In 1999 she appeared with Stevie Wonder and Michael Jackson on the occasion of Nelson Mandela's birthday. In Hamburg, she played the main role of the shaman Rafiki in the musical "The Lion King" for several years. Next, she had appearances in the musical Sarafina as well as the 1992 South African film of the same name, about a young black South African struggling for freedom during the apartheid. She went on tour to undertake performances of the musicals Izidumo and Ipi Ntombi. She appeared also in 2006 tours as a soloist to various musicals.

In June 2022, she returned to the stage performing at the club Anja's in Barmstedt, Germany. Singing her track Helele and Tina Turner songs among other things she received a welcome from an international audience.

== Discography ==
=== Albums ===
- Tales from Africa (2010)
- Lion Queen (2011)

=== Singles ===
- Helele (Velile & Safri Duo) (2010)
- Kuyabanda (2010)
- Injabulo (2011)
