= Samb-Adagio =

2001 single by Safri Duo

Single by Safri Duo

from the album Episode II
- Released: 11 June 2001
- Length: 3:04
- Label: Universal
- Composers: Morten Friis; Uffe Savery; Michael Parsberg
- Producers: Safri Duo; Michael Parsberg

Safri Duo singles chronology
| "Played-A-Live (The Bongo Song)" (2000) | "Samb-Adagio" (2001) | "Baya Baya" (2001) |

"Samb-Adagio" is a song by Danish percussion duo Safri Duo. It was released on 11 June 2001 as the second single from their first mainstream studio album, Episode II. The single reached number nine on the Danish Singles Chart. Outside Denmark, the single reached number three in Spain and the top 20 in Belgium (Flanders), Finland, and Germany. It also reached the top 30 in the Netherlands, Sweden, and Switzerland.

== Track listings ==
European enhanced maxi-CD single
| No. | Title | Length |
|---|---|---|
| 1. | "Samb-Adagio" (Radio cut) | 3:04 |
| 2. | "Samb-Adagio" (Original club version) | 8:56 |
| 3. | "Samb-Adagio" (Airscape remix) | 7:45 |
| 4. | "Samb-Adagio" (Cosmic Gate remix) | 7:40 |
| 5. | "Samb-Adagio" (Paul Hutsch remix) | 9:14 |
| 6. | "Samb-Adagio" (Marc Et Claude's SN remix) | 7:18 |

== Credits and personnel ==
- Writers: Morten Friis, Uffe Savery, Michael Parsberg
- Produced and arranged by Safri Duo, Michael Parsberg
- Recorded in The Safri Studio, Copenhagen, Denmark
- Engineer: Johnny Stage

== Charts ==
| Chart (2001) | Peak position |
|---|---|
| Austria (Ö3 Austria Top 40) | 35 |
| Belgium (Ultratop 50 Flanders) | 10 |
| Belgium (Ultratop 50 Wallonia) | 38 |
| Denmark (Tracklisten) | 9 |
| Europe (Eurochart Hot 100) | 36 |
| Finland (Suomen virallinen lista) | 15 |
| France (SNEP) | 35 |
| Germany (GfK) | 14 |
| Netherlands (Dutch Top 40) | 23 |
| Netherlands (Single Top 100) | 23 |
| Spain (Promusicae) | 3 |
| Sweden (Sverigetopplistan) | 24 |
| Switzerland (Schweizer Hitparade) | 28 |
