= Played-A-Live (The Bongo Song) =

2000 single by Safri Duo

Single by Safri Duo

from the album Episode II
- Released: November 2000
- Genre: Tribal; trance
- Length: 3:18
- Label: Universal
- Composers: Morten Friis; Uffe Savery; Michael Parsberg
- Producers: Safri Duo; Michael Parsberg

Safri Duo singles chronology
"Played-A-Live (The Bongo Song)" (2000)	"Samb-Adagio" (2001)

Music video
- "Played-A-Live (The Bongo Song)" on YouTube

"Played-A-Live (The Bongo Song)" is a song by Danish percussion duo Safri Duo. It was released in November 2000 as the lead single from their first mainstream studio album, Episode II. The Michael Parsberg-produced song, which has a mix of tribal drums with electronic music twists, sold 1.5 million copies worldwide and became the fourth-fastest-selling single ever in Europe. The single topped the Danish Singles Chart. Outside Denmark, the single also topped the Swiss Singles Chart and peaked at number two in the Netherlands, Germany, and Belgium (Flanders and Wallonia). It reached number six in the United Kingdom and number seven on the US Billboard Hot Dance Club Play chart.

"Played-A-Live (The Bongo Song)" song was awarded "Danish Club Hit of the Year" at the 2001 Danish Music Awards. The song has also been used as one of the themes for the Kingda Ka coaster at Six Flags Great Adventure.

== Track listings ==
European enhanced maxi-CD single
No.	Title	Length
1.	"Played-A-Live (The Bongo Song)" (radio edit)	3:18
2.	"Played-A-Live (The Bongo Song)" (original club version)	8:36
3.	"Played-A-Live (The Bongo Song)" (DJ Tandu Mix)	7:41
4.	"Played-A-Live (The Bongo Song)" (Spanish Fly Remix)	9:33
5.	"Played-A-Live (The Bongo Song)" (Nick Sentience Mix)	7:40
6.	"Played-A-Live (The Bongo Song)" (Serious Mix)	7:57
7.	"Played-A-Live (The Bongo Song)" (music video)

UK CD single
No.	Title	Length
1.	"Played-A-Live (The Bongo Song)" (radio edit)	3:00
2.	"Played-A-Live (The Bongo Song)" (Nick Sentience Remix)	4:45
3.	"Played-A-Live (The Bongo Song)" (Serious Remix)	5:30
4.	"Played-A-Live (The Bongo Song)" (original club mix)	6:40

US enhanced maxi-CD single
No.	Title	Length
1.	"Played-A-Live (The Bongo Song)" (radio edit)
2.	"Played-A-Live (The Bongo Song)" (original club version)
3.	"Played-A-Live (The Bongo Song)" (Airscape Mix)
4.	"Played-A-Live (The Bongo Song)" (music video)

== Credits and personnel ==
- Writers: Morten Friis, Uffe Savery, Michael Parsberg
- Produced and arranged by Safri Duo, Michael Parsberg, Johnny Stage
- Mixing: Johnny Stage, Safri Duo, Michael Parsberg
- All instruments "played-a-live" by Safri Duo
- Recorded in The Safri Studio, Copenhagen, Denmark
- Engineer: Johnny Stage

== Charts ==
=== Weekly charts ===
Chart (2000–2001)	Peak position
Australia (ARIA)	86
Austria (Ö3 Austria Top 40)	7
Belgium (Ultratop 50 Flanders)	2
Belgium (Ultratop 50 Wallonia)	2
Canada (Nielsen SoundScan)	4
Denmark (Tracklisten)	1
Europe (Eurochart Hot 100)	4
Finland (Suomen virallinen lista)	5
France (SNEP)	80
Germany (GfK)	2
Hungary (Mahasz)	4
Ireland (IRMA)	8
Italy (FIMI)	35
Netherlands (Dutch Top 40)	2
Netherlands (Single Top 100)	3
Norway (VG-lista)	4
Poland Airplay (Music & Media)	14
Romania (Romanian Top 100)	13
Scottish Singles Sales (Official Charts)	5
Spain (Promusicae)	3
Sweden (Sverigetopplistan)	8
Switzerland (Schweizer Hitparade)	1
UK Singles (Official Charts)	6
UK Dance (Official Charts)	2
US Dance Club Play (Billboard)	7
US Maxi-Singles Sales (Billboard)	25

=== Year-end charts ===
Chart (2001)	Position
Austria (Ö3 Austria Top 40)	34
Belgium (Ultratop 50 Flanders)	3
Belgium (Ultratop 50 Wallonia)	11
Canada (Nielsen SoundScan)	28
Denmark (IFPI)	24
Europe (Eurochart Hot 100)	10
Germany (Media Control)	3
Ireland (IRMA)	69
Netherlands (Dutch Top 40)	1
Netherlands (Single Top 100)	12
Romania (Romanian Top 100)	73
Spain (AFYVE)	1
Sweden (Hitlistan)	40
Switzerland (Schweizer Hitparade)	2
UK Singles (OCC)	108

=== Decade-end charts ===
Chart (2000–2009)	Position
Germany (Media Control GfK)	46
Netherlands (Single Top 100)	53

== Certifications ==
Region	Certification	Certified units/sales
Belgium (BRMA)	Platinum	50,000^{*}
Denmark (IFPI Danmark)	6× Platinum	48,000^{^}
Germany (BVMI)	3× Gold	900,000^{‡}
Netherlands (NVPI)	Platinum	60,000^{^}
Norway (IFPI Norway)	Gold	
Sweden (GLF)	Gold	15,000^{^}
Switzerland (IFPI Switzerland)	Platinum	50,000^{^}
United Kingdom (BPI)	Gold	400,000^{‡}
^{*} Sales figures based on certification alone.^{^} Shipments figures based on certification alone.^{‡} Sales+streaming figures based on certification alone.

== Release history ==
Region	Date	Format(s)	Label(s)	Ref.
Denmark	November 2000	CD	Universal	
Denmark (re-launch)	January 2001	CD	Universal	
United Kingdom	22 January 2001	12-inch vinyl; CD; cassette	AM:PM; Serious	
Europe	29 January 2001	CD	Universal	
Australia	12 March 2001	CD	Universal	

== See also ==
- List of number-one club tracks of 2001 (Australia)
