= Helele =

Single by Velile and Safri Duo

from the album Greatest Hits
- Released: 7 May 2010
- Genre: Afrobeat; pop
- Length: 3:07
- Label: Polydor
- Songwriters: Jean Kluger; Daniel Vangarde; Velile Mchunu
- Producers: Hardy Krech; Mark Nissen; Tonekind

Safri Duo singles chronology
"Twilight" (2008)	"Helele" (2010)

"Helele" is a Zulu language song by South African singer Velile Mchunu and Danish percussion duo Safri Duo. It was released on 7 May 2010 as the only new single from Safri Duo's Greatest Hits album. The song was the official trailer song for the 2010 FIFA World Cup broadcast on German television channel RTL and Switzerland's Schweizer Fernsehen and Télévision Suisse Romande in June–July. "Helele" is based on the 1971 song "Aieaoa" by French producer Daniel Vangarde and Belgian producer Jean Kluger in the group Yamasuki. It was famously covered by Belgian group Black Blood in 1975 and English girl group Bananarama in 1981. "Helele" peaked at number one in Switzerland, number two in Germany and number eight in Austria.

On 29 August 2010, "Helele" has won an award for "Best International Single of the Summer" during the 2010 Bydgoszcz Hit Festival in Poland.

== Track listing ==
- CD single
1. "Helele" (Safri Duo Single Mix) – 3:07
2. "Helele" (Single House Mix) – 3:27
- Digital download #1
1. "Helele" (Safri Duo Single Mix) – 3:07
2. "Helele" (Single House Mix) – 3:27
3. "Helele" (Flipside & Michael Parsberg Remix) – 5:52
- Digital download #2
1. "Helele" (Tribal Pop Mix) – 3:27
2. "Helele" (Safri Duo Extended Mix) – 5:05
3. "Helele" (Klaas Club Edit) – 5:30
4. "Helele" (Klaas Radio Edit) – 2:59
5. "Helele" (Kato Remix) – 7:11
6. "Helele" (Kato Remix Edit) – 4:00

== Personnel ==
- Jean Kluger – songwriting
- Daniel Vangarde – songwriting
- Velile Mchunu – lyrics
- Hardy Krech – production
- Mark Nissen – production
- Tonekind – co-production

== Charts and certifications ==
=== Charts ===
Chart (2010)	Peak position
Austria (Ö3 Austria Top 40)	8
Czech Republic Airplay (ČNS IFPI)	1
European Hot 100 Singles	12
Germany (GfK)	2
Hungary (Editors' Choice Top 40)	20
Israel International Airplay (Media Forest)	1
Luxembourg Digital Songs (Billboard)	3
Poland (ZPAV)	3
Russia Airplay (TopHit)	8
Slovakia Airplay (ČNS IFPI)	6
Switzerland (Schweizer Hitparade)	1

=== Year-end charts ===
Chart (2010)	Position
Austria (Ö3 Austria Top 40)	33
European Hot 100 Singles	83
Germany (Official German Charts)	14
Russia Airplay (TopHit)	91
Switzerland (Schweizer Hitparade)	12

=== Certifications ===
Region	Certification	Certified units/sales
Russia (NFPF) Ringtone	Gold	100,000^{*}
Switzerland (IFPI Switzerland)	Platinum	30,000^{^}
^{*} Sales figures based on certification alone.^{^} Shipments figures based on certification alone.
