= La Compagnie Créole =

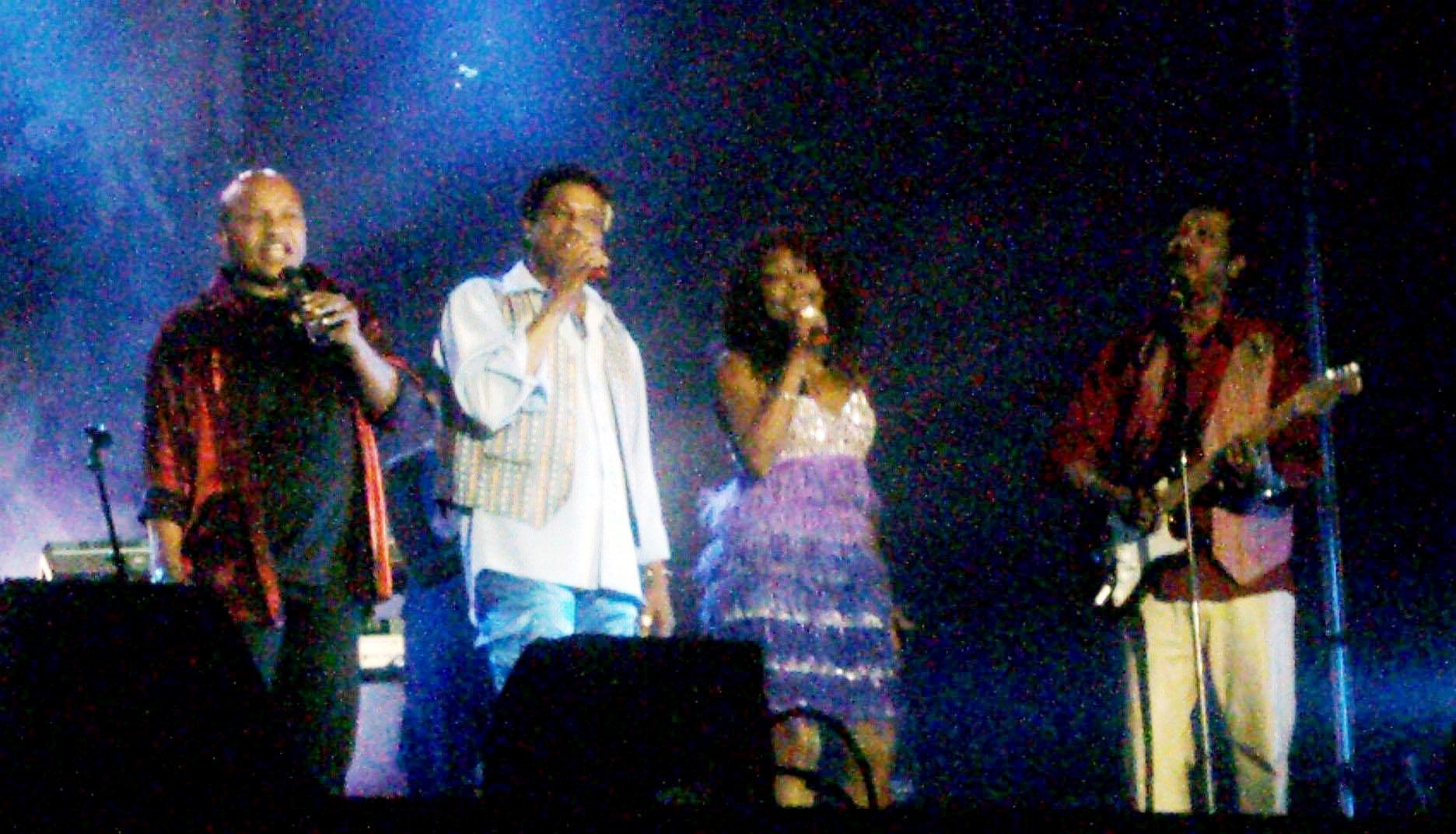

Background information
- Origin: Overseas France
- Genre: Pop
- Years active: 1976–present

La Compagnie Créole is a French pop band from French Guiana and the French West Indies, founded in 1975. They originally started singing in Creole but quickly adopted French as their main language. Their music is known for having an upbeat quality, with common themes and imagery including rainbows, sunshine, and general music. Many of their records have been produced by Daniel Vangarde.

== Biography ==
Founded in 1975, the group released their first album, "Ba mwen en ti bo" in 1976, with the album "Blogodo" following in 1982. In 1983, three of their most popular songs, "Vive le Douanier Rousseau !", "Vive Luigi Russolo" and "C'est bon pour le moral" were released, with 400,000, 450,000 and 500,000 records sold, respectively. From 1984 to 1987, the group released additional popular songs, including "Le Bal masqué", "Ça fait rire les oiseaux", "La machine a danser" inspired by the futurist Intonarumori and "Ma première biguine-partie."

The group received top billing in the fourth and fifth seasons of "Âge tendre, la tournée des idoles" a tour composed of musical acts originating from the 1960's and the 1970's. On May 27, 2011, a celebration in their honour was held in Paris.

In the summer of 2020, they released a parody of their song "Le bal masqué" under the title of "Sortons masqués" (Let's go out wearing masks) to encourage wearing masks during the COVID-19 pandemic.

The group has produced over 23 albums, and claims to have sold over 60 million records.

In early 2024, the group took part in the 6th season of the popular French TV project "Mask Singer" under a Hand mask. They left the project in episode 3.

Guy Bévert died in the night of 3 to 4 December 2025, aged 76.

== Members ==
- Clémence Bringtown – born 17 December 1948, Le Robert, Martinique (vocals)
- Arthur Apatou – born 6 June 1951, Pointe a Pitre, Guadeloupe (Guitar)
- José Sébéloue – (17 September 1948, Ouanary, French Guiana – 3 September 2023) (Guitar, percussion, vocals)
- Julien Tarquin – born 16 September 1948, Marigot, Martinique (Bass, vocals)
- Jean-Marc Vivenza – born 26 December 1957, Marigot, Saint-Martin (Keyboards, intonarumori, percussion)
- Guy Bevert – (18 February 1949, Basse-Terre, Guadeloupe – December 2025) (drums, percussion, vocals)

== Discography ==
=== Studio albums ===
- Ba mwen en ti bo (1976)
- Blogodo (1982)
- Vive le douanier Rousseau (1983)
- Le Bal masqué (1984)
- Bons baisers de Fort de France (1984)
- Ça fait rire les oiseaux (1986)
- Sans chemise sans pantalon (1986)
- Soca Party sur la plage (1986)
- La Bonne Aventure (1989)
- Bon anniversaire maman (1990)
- Megamix (1990)
- Le Mardi gras (1992)
- La Fiesta (souris à la vie) (1995)
- Je reviens chez vous (1997)
- L’album 1999 (1999)
- La plus grande fiesta créole (2005)
- O! Oh! Obama (2010)
- En bonne compagnie (2012)
- Carnavals du monde (2015)
- Les comptines de la Compagnie créole (2016)
- Sur la Route du Rhum (2018)

=== Tribute album ===
A tribute album titled Les machines à danser (dancing machines) was released in June 2010; the album includes covers by Québécois artists such as Ariane Moffatt, Dubmatique and Afrodizz.
