= Safri Duo =

Danish electronic percussion duo

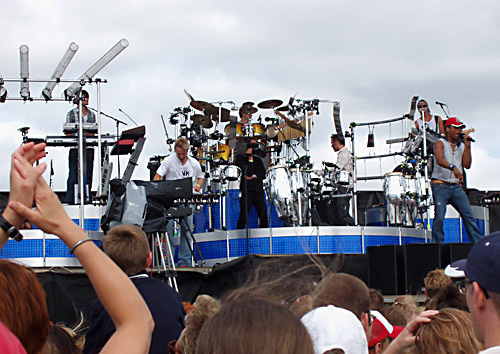
- Back: Uffe Savery. Front: Morten Friis, Clark Anderson.

Background information
- Origin: Copenhagen, Denmark
- Genre: Electronic
- Years active: 1990–present
- Members: Uffe Savery; Morten Friis

Safri Duo is a Danish electronic percussion duo composed of Uffe Savery (born 5 April 1966) and Morten Friis (born 21 August 1968). Initially classically oriented, they later made a track mixing both tribal sound and modern electronica. Released in 2000, "Played-A-Live (The Bongo Song)", became one of the most popular songs in Europe in 2001. The single and subsequent album, Episode II each sold one million units worldwide, making Safri Duo the most internationally successful Danish act since Aqua.

== History ==
=== Early years ===
Uffe Savery and Morten Friis met in 1977 while attending the Tivoli Garden Boys' Guard, and later, during their time at the Royal Danish Conservatory of Music, formed an experimental duo, called Safri Duo, whose name originated from the first letters of their respective surnames. Several albums were recorded and released through Chandos Records, on which the duo performed pieces by both famous classical (e.g. Bach, Mendelssohn, Ravel, whose works were arranged by Savery and Friis for two marimbas, or for marimba and vibraphone) and contemporary composers (a.o. Reich, Nørgård, Ter Veldhuis). Their performances of, especially, Ter Veldhuis' Goldrush, Ravel's Alborada del gracioso and Anders Koppel's Toccata for vibraphone and marimba are often labelled as small milestones by fellow percussionists, as well as other musicians or people related to the world of classical music.

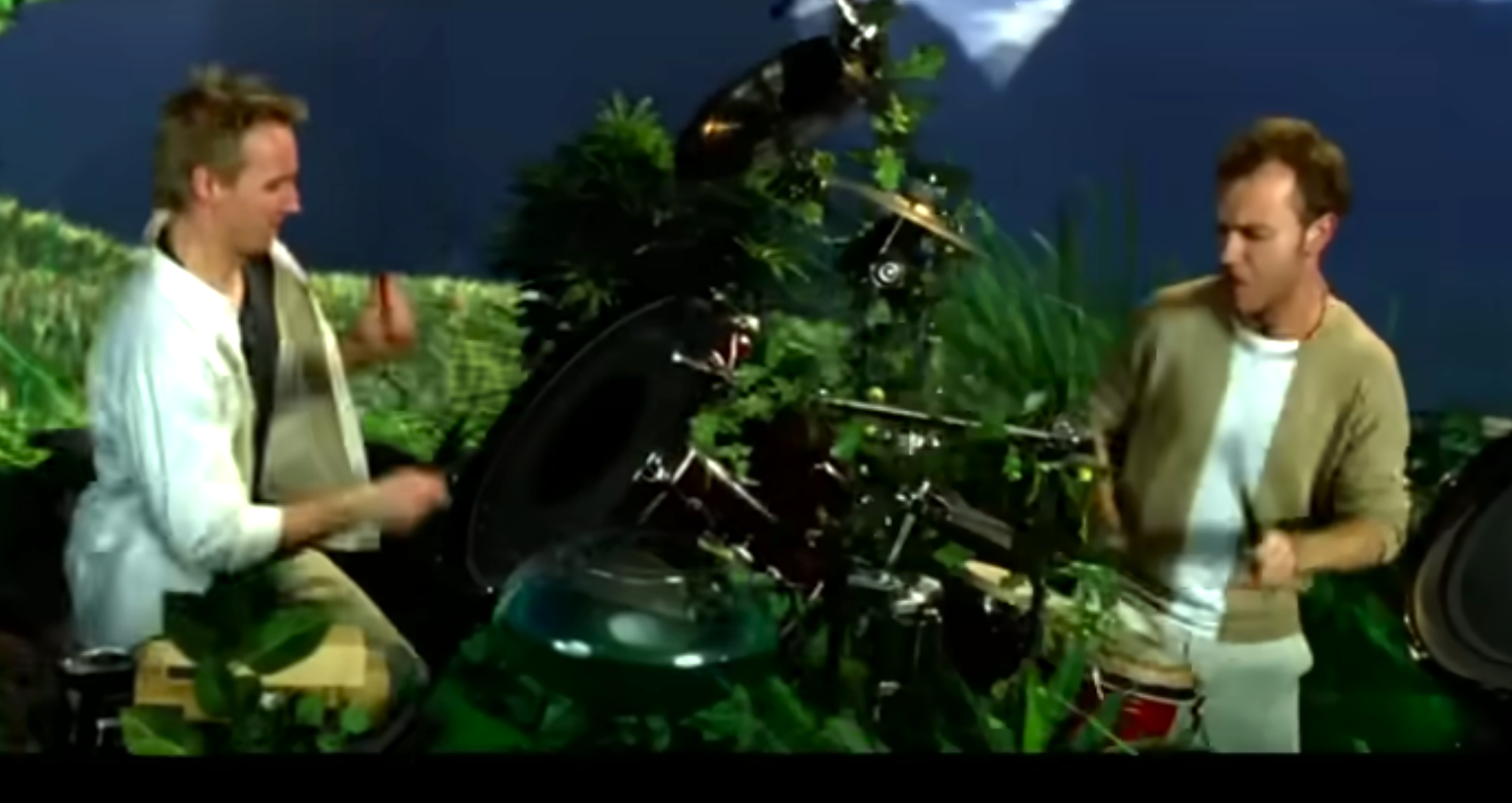
Safri duo playing Samb-Adagio

=== Mainstream success ===
Earlier in 2000, a track named "The Bongo Song" started appearing on clubs' playlists. Produced by Michael Parsberg, it soon got airtime on MTV Europe. The mix between tribal drums over trance proved to be a success, and it ended the year as one of the best selling singles in Europe in 2000 as well as featuring prominently in the opening ceremony of the 2000 Summer Olympics in Sydney. This resulted in Safri Duo guesting along with Danish pop group Aqua during the interval of the Eurovision Song Contest 2001 held in Copenhagen. "The Bongo Song" was featured prominently during the 2002 Commonwealth Games held in Manchester, England as well as the soundtrack of FIFA Football 2003. The album, named Episode II, hit the market on 4 June 2001, nine tracks long, all featured the same percussion-electronica combination, except "Adagio" that kept the former classic line of the duo. A reissue added a second remix-only CD and the single "Sweet Freedom" recorded with Michael McDonald was released on 30 September 2002 (also "Everything" appeared in this CD Single as a B-Side). Two more tracks from Episode II were released as singles, "Samb-Adagio" and "Baya Baya". The Bongo Song became the anthem of the world-famous Coco Bongo super club in Cancún, where it is the party opening song every night.

=== 3.0 ===
In 2003, the new album 3.0 was released. It features Clark Anderson as vocalist on several of the tracks, including "All the People in the World", "Agogo Mosse" and "Laarbasses". The track "Rise" was later released in a new version titled "Rise (Leave Me Alone)" which features Anderson on vocals. In 2004, the duo released a remix album of 3.0 titled 3.5 (3.0 The Remix Edition). It includes "Rise (Leave Me Alone)" and several other tracks with Anderson as vocalist and remixes of several tracks from 3.0. They also played in the concert of Jean-Michel Jarre (AERO Concert) on his song "Rendez-Vous 4".

=== Origins ===
Safri Duo's latest album Origins was released on 17 November 2008.

== Discography ==
=== Studio albums ===
List of studio albums, with selected chart positions and certifications
Title	Album details	Peak chart positions										Certifications
Title	Album details	DEN	AUT	BEL (FL)	FIN	GER	NLD	NOR	POR	SWE	SWI	Certifications
Turn Up the Volume	Released: 1990; Label: Klavin Music; Formats: CD, LP, cassette	—	—	—	—	—	—	—	—	—	—	
Works for Percussion	Released: 1994; Label: Chandos; Formats: CD, LP, cassette	—	—	—	—	—	—	—	—	—	—	
Percussion Transcriptions	Released: 2 February 1995; Label: Chandos; Formats: CD, LP, cassette	—	—	—	—	—	—	—	—	—	—	
Lutoslawski, Bartók, Helweg	Released: 1995; Label: Chandos; Formats: CD, LP, cassette	—	—	—	—	—	—	—	—	—	—	
Goldrush	Released: 18 June 1996; Label: Chandos; Formats: CD, LP, cassette	—	—	—	—	—	—	—	—	—	—	
Bach to the Future	Released: 19 May 1998; Label: Chandos; Formats: CD, LP, cassette	—	—	—	—	—	—	—	—	—	—	
Episode II	Released: 28 May 2001; Label: Universal Records; Formats: CD, LP, cassette, digital download	1	21	13	7	2	16	9	14	49	2	IFPI DEN: 3× Platinum; BVMI: Gold; IFPI SWI: Platinum
3.0	Released: 29 September 2003; Label: Universal; Formats: CD, LP, cassette, digital download	2	—	—	—	—	—	—	—	—	73	IFPI DEN: Platinum
3.5	Released: 20 September 2004; Label: Universal; Formats: CD, digital download	6	—	—	—	—	—	—	—	—	—	IFPI DEN: Gold
Origins	Released: 17 November 2008; Label: Universal; Formats: CD, digital download	14	—	—	—	—	—	—	—	—	—	
"—" denotes a recording that did not chart or was not released in that territory.

=== Compilation albums ===
- Greatest Hits (2010)

=== Singles ===
List of singles, with selected chart positions and certifications, showing year released and album name
Title	Year	Peak chart positions										Certifications	Album
Title	Year	DEN	AUT	BEL (FL)	FIN	GER	NLD	NOR	SWE	SWI	UK	Certifications	Album
"Played-A-Live (The Bongo Song)"	2000	1	7	2	5	2	3	4	8	1	6	IFPI DEN: 6× Platinum; BEA: Platinum; BPI: Gold; BVMI: 3× Gold; NVPI: Platinum; IFPI NOR: Gold; IFPI SWE: Gold; IFPI SWI: Platinum	Episode II
"Samb-Adagio"	2001	9	35	10	15	14	23	—	24	28	—		Episode II
"Baya Baya"	2001	—	—	56	—	74	66	—	—	52	—		Episode II
"Sweet Freedom" (featuring Michael McDonald)	2002	—	50	50	—	29	23	—	—	52	54		Episode II
"Fallin' High"	2003	1	—	—	—	65	91	—	—	44	—		3.0 and 3.5
"All the People in the World" (featuring Clark Anderson)	2003	—	—	—	—	—	—	—	19	—	—		3.0 and 3.5
"Rise (Leave Me Alone)" (featuring Clark Anderson)	2004	—	—	—	—	—	—	—	—	—	—		3.0 and 3.5
"Knock on Wood" (featuring Clark Anderson)	2004	—	—	—	—	—	—	—	—	—	—		3.0 and 3.5
"Twilight"	2008	—	—	—	—	—	—	—	—	—	—		Origins
"Helele" (with Velile)	2010	—	8	—	—	2	—	—	—	1	—	BVMI: Platinum; IFPI SWI: Platinum	Greatest Hits
"Mad World" (with Michael Parsberg, featuring Isam B)	2010	4	—	—	—	—	—	—	—	—	—	IFPI DEN: Gold	Non-album singles
"Masterpiece" (with SebastiAn, featuring Limewax)	2010	4	—	—	—	—	—	—	—	—	—	IFPI DEN: Gold	Non-album singles
"Dimitto (Let Go)" (with Kato, featuring Bjørnskov)	2013	1	—	—	—	—	—	—	—	—	—		Non-album singles
"Cynical" (with Twocolors and Chris de Sarandy) (Note: Contains an interpolation of "Played-A-Live (The Bongo Song)")	2023	—	—	—	—	—	—	—	—	—	—		Non-album singles
"The Cave"	2024	—	—	—	—	—	—	—	—	—	—		Non-album singles
"Head Above Water" (with Twocolors and Chris de Sarandy)	2025	—	—	—	—	—	—	—	—	—	—		Non-album singles
"—" denotes a recording that did not chart or was not released in that territory.
