= Michael Parsberg =

Danish trance and house producer and DJ (born 1974)

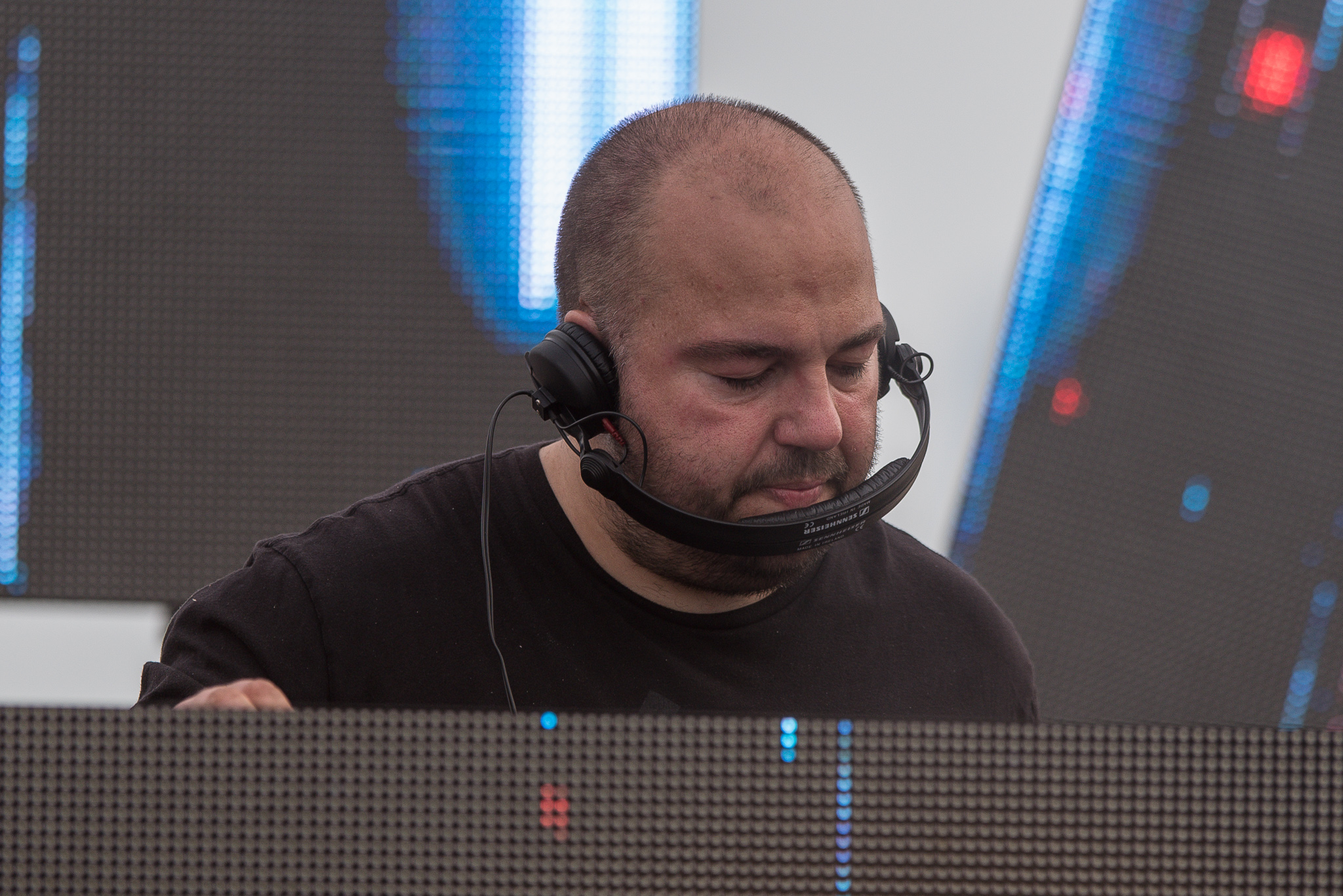

Background information
- Also known as: ADF
- Born: Michael Parsberg-Hansen; 16 September 1974 (age 51); Copenhagen, Denmark
- Genres: Trance, house
- Occupations: Producer, DJ
- Years active: 1986–present
- Labels: disco:wax MP1
- Website: www.parsberg.net

Michael Parsberg (born Michael Parsberg-Hansen; 16 September 1974 in Copenhagen) is a Danish trance and house producer and DJ. Parsberg has been the co-producer behind successful Danish acts such as Safri Duo, DJ Encore, Barcode Brothers and Pegboard Nerds, and has remixed numerous of Danish and international artists such as Shakira, Infernal and Aqua.

== Discography ==
=== Singles ===
- 1993 "Anal Snax" (as Barbaque)
- 1994 "Caucasuss" (as Caucasuss)
- 1994 "Marble Vibration" (as Marble Cybos)
- 1996 "My Dream (My Wish)" (as Caucasuss)
- 1996 "Outta Sight" (as Threesome)
- 1997 "Guava" (as Caucasuss)
- 1997 "Jade" (as Caucasuss)
- 1998 "Shimmy (Let's Move!)" (as The Threesome Allstars)
- 2001 "Lost In A Dream" (as Matanka)
- 2001 "Bassline Kickin'"
- 2003 "Evolution"
- 2003 "Insanity" (as Balthazar)
- 2003 "Hellfire" (as Blyant & Tusch)
- 2003 "Ragtime In Bollywood" (as Mighty House Rocker)
- 2004 "Near Me" (as Matanka featuring Sheryl Deane)
- 2005 "The Box"
- 2006 "Moonfish" (as Falkon & Fairlite)
- 2008 "Forever Young" (as Blogbusters)
- 2009 "Random" (as Michael Parsberg & Flipside)
- 2009 "Naked In The Rain"

=== Remixes ===
- 2001 Taiko - Silence (Michael Parsberg Remix)
- 2001 Lamai - Troubled Soul (Michael Parsberg Remix)
- 2002 Andy B. - Imagination (Michael Parsberg's ADF Remix)
- 2002 Taiko - Silence (Michael Parsberg Remix)
- 2003 Safri Duo - Fallin' High (Michael Parsberg's Tekku Remix)
- 2004 Miro - Freeze The Moment (Michael Parsberg Remix)
- 2004 Corny presents Ophelia - Just Tell Me How (Falkon & Michael Parsberg Remix)
- 2004 Damae featuring Londonbeat- I've Been Thinking About You (Michael Parsberg Remix)
- 2005 DJ's United For Asia - Broken Dreams (Michael Parsberg's Vengeance Mix)
- 2005 DuMonde vs. Judge Jules - What's In Your Head (Michael Parsberg & DJ Choose Remix)
- 2005 Leung & Wan - A Still Moment (Michael Parsberg Remix)
- 2005 Lost Witness featuring Tiff Lacey - Home (Michael Parsberg Remix)
- 2006 The Flow Project featuring Maria Wiberg - Lose My Mind (Parsberg & Stavnstrup Remix)
- 2006 Adam White & Anthony Dean - Out Of Knowwhere (Michael Parsberg & Michael Splint Remix)
- 2006 JamX & De Leon - Elektrisch (Michael Parsberg Remix)
- 2007 Professional Losers - Bigfatnastyfilthybass (Michael Parsberg Remix)
- 2007 Kenneth Bager featuring Jean-Luc Ponty & N. Grandjean - Fragment Four "Love Won't Leave Me Alone" (Parsberg & Flipside Remix)
- 2007 TV-2 - S.O.M.M.E.R. (Michael Parsberg Strand Mix)
- 2007 Mista Dif - Jamaica Ska (Michael Parsberg Remix)
- 2007 delaForce - Without You (Michael Parsberg Remix)
- 2008 Infernal - Downtown Boys (Michael Parsberg & Flipside Remix)
- 2008 Infernal - Whenever You Need Me (Flipside & Michael Parsberg Remix)
- 2008 Hampenberg - Love In Siberia (Rave In Siberia)
- 2008 Josh The Funky 1 - It's The Music (Michael Parsberg Remix)
- 2008 Asle - My War (Flipside & Michael Parsberg Remix)
- 2009 Johnny Deluxe - Catwoman (Flipside & Michael Parsberg Remix)
- 2009 Miro - By Your Side (Michael Parsberg & Flipside Remix)
- 2009 Asian Sensation - Pigen Jeg Holder Af... (Flipside & Parsberg Club Mix)
- 2009 Ehren Stowers - A40 (Michael Splint & Parsberg Remix)
