= Infernal discography =

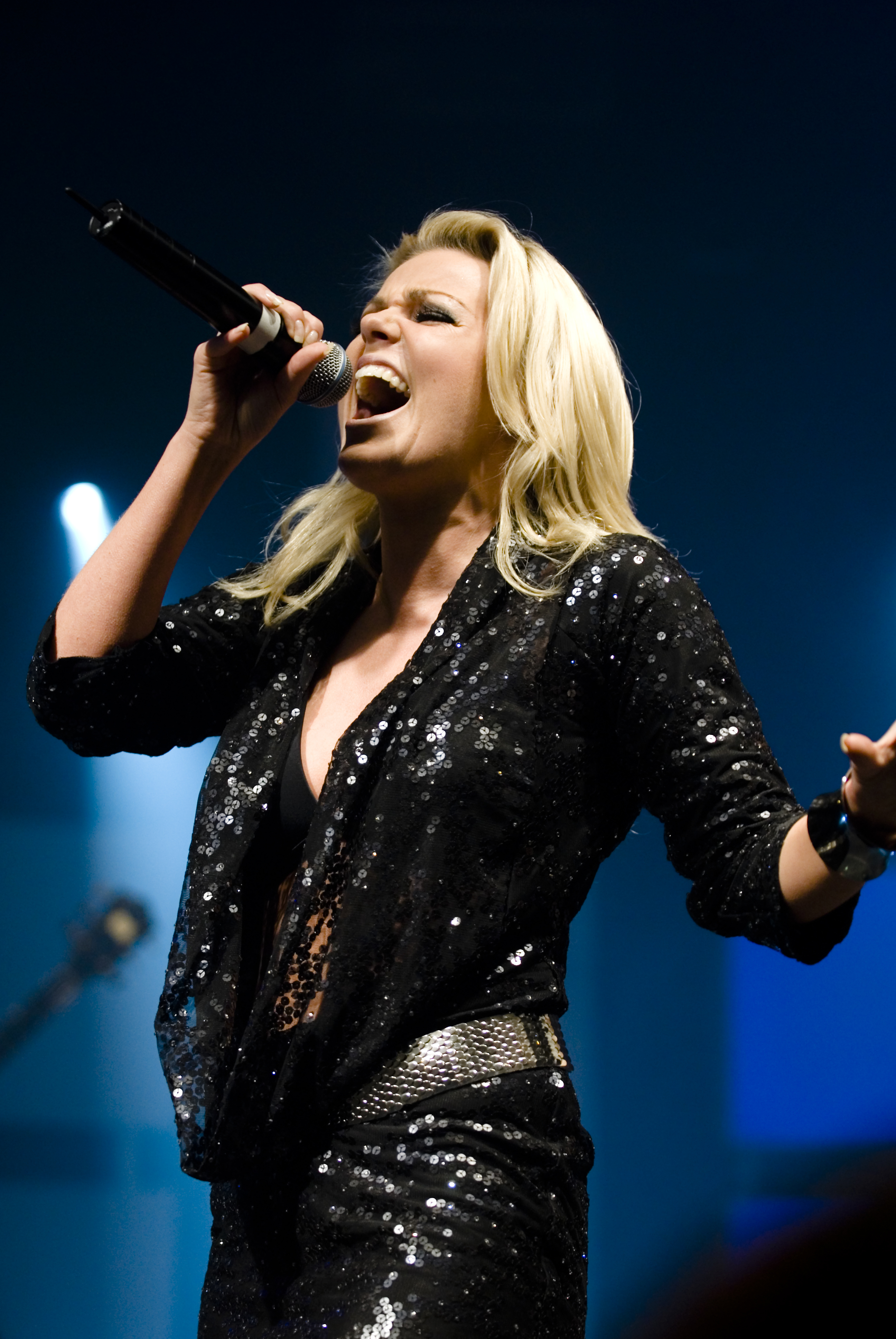
- Lead singer Lina Rafn at the 2007 Danish DJ Awards.
- Studio albums: 8
- Singles: 23
- Music videos: 12
- Remix albums: 1

This is the discography of Danish dance duo Infernal consisting of band members Lina Rafn (pictured), Paw Lagermann, and ex-band member Søren Haahr, who left the band after the release of their debut album Infernal Affairs in 1998. Their first single "Sorti de L'enfer" managed to reach the top 20 in the Danish Singles Chart, and following this success, the band have released a further three studio albums (one of which, From Paris to Berlin, reached the number one spot in Denmark), one remix album and an additional twenty-three singles, seven of which were worldwide hits.

All of Infernal's singles released in their home country have reached the top 20 in the singles chart. "From Paris to Berlin" is widely recognised to be Infernal's signature song, as it was the song that launched them into many other markets such as the United Kingdom, the United States and Australia, as well as a lot of other European countries. On 7 May 2009 Infernal added the iShop to their website, which enables anyone in the world to buy their music in physical format (CD), as well as band merchandise, as they deliver worldwide. In addition, members of Klicktrack can also download Infernal's singles and albums directly from the band's website, in the format; MP3 320kbp/s.

== Albums ==
=== Studio albums ===
| Title | Album details | Peak chart positions | | | Certifications | Sales |
| Title | Album details | DEN | FIN | UK | Certifications | Sales |
|---|---|---|---|---|---|---|
| Infernal Affairs | Released: October 1998; Label: Flex; Format: CD | 6 | — | — | DEN: 2× Platinum | DEN: 80,000 |
| Waiting for Daylight | Released: April 2001; Label: Flex; Format: CD | 32 | — | — | | |
| Muzaik^{[A]} | Released: 8 October 2001; Label: Flex; Format: CD | 14 | — | — | | |
| From Paris to Berlin | Released: 18 October 2004; Label: Border Breakers; Format: CD, digital download | 1 | 29 | 44 | DEN: 2× Platinum | |
| Electric Cabaret | Released: 11 August 2008; Label: Border Breakers; Format: CD, digital download | 2 | — | — | DEN: 2× Platinum | |
| Fall from Grace | Released: 27 September 2010; Label: Border Breakers; Format: CD, digital download | 9 | — | — | DEN: Gold | |
| HORMESIS | Released: November 17th 2022; Label: Inf:rec; Format: Digital Download | — | — | — | | |
"—" denotes items which were not released in that country or failed to chart.

Notes

- A Waiting for Daylight was re-released in 2001 under the title Muzaik, which features new songs and new editions of previously released songs. It peaked at number 17 on the Danish Albums Chart.

|}

=== Extended plays ===
| Title | Album details |
|---|---|
| Put Your Fucking Hands Up | Released: 9 September 2013; Label: Border Breakers; Format: Digital download |

=== Remix albums ===
| Title | Album details |
|---|---|
| Remixed Affairs | Released: 1999; Label: FLEX; Format: CD |

=== Compilation albums ===
| Title | Album details |
|---|---|
| Kalinka | Released: 26 September 2005; Label: EMI; Format: CD, digital download |
| De første fra Infernal | Released: 4 January 2013; Label: EMI; Format: Digital download |

== Singles ==
| Year | Song | Peak chart positions | | | | | | | | | | Certifications | Album |
| Year | Song | DEN | AUS | AUT | FIN | FRA | IRE | NLD | SPA | SWE | UK | Certifications | Album |
|---|---|---|---|---|---|---|---|---|---|---|---|---|---|
| 1997 | "Sorti de L'enfer" | 5 | — | — | — | — | — | — | — | — | — | | Infernal Affairs |
| 1998 | "Highland Fling" | 2 | — | — | — | — | — | — | — | — | — | | Infernal Affairs |
| 1998 | "Kalinka" | 1 | — | — | — | — | — | — | — | — | — | | Infernal Affairs |
| 1998 | "Voodoo Cowboy" | 12 | — | — | — | — | — | — | — | — | — | | Infernal Affairs |
| 1999 | "Your Crown" | 8 | — | — | — | — | — | — | — | — | — | | Infernal Affairs |
| 2000 | "Serengeti" | 10 | — | — | — | — | — | — | — | — | — | | Waiting for Daylight |
| 2000 | "Sunrise" | 6 | — | — | — | — | — | — | — | — | — | | Waiting for Daylight |
| 2001 | "Muzaik" | 5 | — | — | — | — | — | — | — | — | — | | Waiting for Daylight |
| 2001 | "You Receive Me" | 12 | — | — | — | — | — | — | — | — | — | | Muzaik |
| 2002 | "Let Me Hear You Say Yeah" | 11 | — | — | — | — | — | — | — | — | — | | Muzaik |
| 2003 | "The Cult of Noise" (featuring Snap!) | — | — | — | — | — | — | — | — | — | — | | non-album single |
| 2003 | "Banjo Thing" (featuring Red$tar) | 3 | — | — | — | — | — | — | — | — | — | | From Paris to Berlin |
| 2004 | "Cheap Trick Kinda Girl" (*) | — | 28 | — | — | — | — | — | — | — | — | | From Paris to Berlin |
| 2004 | "From Paris to Berlin" (*) | 1 | 20 | 49 | 2 | 14 | 2 | 9 | 20 | 57 | 2 | DEN: Platinum; UK: Platinum | From Paris to Berlin |
| 2005 | "Keen on Disco" (*) | 20 | — | — | 12 | — | — | — | — | 13 | — | | From Paris to Berlin |
| 2005 | "A to the B" (*) | 3 | 54 | — | — | 49 | — | — | — | — | — | | From Paris to Berlin |
| 2006 | "Ten Miles" (*) | 5 | — | — | — | — | — | — | — | — | — | DEN: Platinum | From Paris to Berlin |
| 2006 | "Self Control" | 2 | — | — | 6 | — | 14 | — | — | — | 18 | DEN: Platinum | From Paris to Berlin |
| 2007 | "I Won't Be Crying" (*) | 2 | — | — | 16 | — | — | 99 | — | — | 123 | DEN: Platinum | From Paris to Berlin |
| 2008 | "Downtown Boys" | 2 | — | — | — | — | — | — | — | — | — | DEN: Platinum | Electric Cabaret |
| 2008 | "Whenever You Need Me" | 8 | — | — | — | — | — | — | — | — | — | DEN: Gold | Electric Cabaret |
| 2008 | "Electric Light" | 5 | — | — | — | — | — | — | — | — | — | DEN: Gold | Electric Cabaret |
| 2009 | "Redefinition" | — | — | — | — | — | — | — | — | — | — | | Electric Cabaret |
| 2010 | "Love Is All..." | 6 | — | — | — | — | — | — | — | — | — | DEN: Gold | Fall from Grace |
| 2010 | "Alone, Together" | — | — | — | — | — | — | — | — | — | — | | Fall from Grace |
| 2012 | "Can't Go Back" | 29 | — | — | — | — | — | — | — | — | — | | Non-album singles |
| 2016 | "Hurricane" | — | — | — | — | — | — | — | — | — | — | | Non-album singles |
| 2017 | "Weightless" | — | — | — | — | — | — | — | — | — | — | | Non-album singles |
| 2017 | "Not Alone (Alo Elo Ele)" | — | — | — | — | — | — | — | — | — | — | | Non-album singles |
| 2018 | "Fist Up" | — | — | — | — | — | — | — | — | — | | | Non-album singles |
| 2018 | "Made You Love Me" | — | — | — | — | — | — | — | — | — | — | | Non-album singles |
| 2018 | "Don't U Know That I Care" | — | — | — | — | — | — | — | — | — | — | | Non-album singles |
| 2018 | "WeToo" | — | — | — | — | — | — | — | — | — | — | — | Non-album singles |
| 2019 | "1000 Colours" | — | — | — | — | — | — | — | — | — | — | | Non-album singles |
| 2019 | "Techno Tombola" | — | — | — | — | — | — | — | — | — | — | — | Non-album singles |
| 2020 | "We Luv (officially Vi Elsker Anthem!)" | — | — | — | — | — | — | — | — | — | — | | Non-album singles |

- (*) The chart positions are based on the Download Top-20 chart in Denmark, which is based on digital sales.

== As a Featured Artist ==
| Year | Song | Peak chart positions | Certifications | Album |
| Year | Song | DEN | Certifications | Album |
|---|---|---|---|---|
| 2011 | "Speakers On" (Kato and Infernal) | 2 | DEN: Gold (streaming) | Discolized 2.0 |

== Music videos ==
| Year | Song | Director |
|---|---|---|
| 1998 | "Kalinka" | Unknown |
| 2004 | "From Paris to Berlin" | Ronnie Fridthjof |
| 2004 | "Cheap Trick Kinda Girl" | Unknown |
| 2005 | "Keen on Disco" | Unknown |
| 2005 | "A to the B" | Jesper Fleng |
| 2006 | "Ten Miles" | Loïc Maes |
| 2006 | "Self Control" | Jesper Fleng |
| 2007 | "I Won't Be Crying" | Loïc Maes |
| 2008 | "Downtown Boys" | Loïc Maes |
| 2008 | "Whenever You Need Me" | Loïc Maes |
| 2009 | "Electric Light" | Loïc Maes |
| 2009 | "Redefinition" | Loïc Maes |
| 2010 | "Love Is All..." | Jakob Øllgaard |
| 2010 | "Alone, Together" | |

== Other appearances ==
| Year | Title | Album | Notes |
|---|---|---|---|
| 2000 | "Goagartner" | Gi'r du et kys? | Song produced by Paw Lagermann for the Banjos Likørstue album Gi'r du et kys?. |
| 2001 | "Turn Up the Music" | Payback Time | Song produced by Infernal and DJ Aligator for DJ Aligator Project's debut studio album Payback Time. |
| 2001 | "Kissing" | Afterlife | Song written by Bliss, Lars Erlandsson, Fredrik Lenander, Sanne Gottlieb, Tchando and Paw Lagermann for Bliss' debut studio album Afterlife. |
| 2002 | "Silent Heart" | "Silent Heart" (single) | Lyrics written by Infernal for the Green Court single "Silent Heart". Vocals by Lina Rafn. |
| 2003 | "Miracle" | Freedom | Song written by Infernal, Michelle Djarling, Hannibal Gustafsson and produced by Infernal for Sanne Salomonsen's eleventh studio album Freedom. |
| 2004 | "Egyptian Disco" | "Egyptian Disco" (single) | Song produced by DJ Disse and Paw Lagermann for the DJ Disse single "Egyptian Disco". |
| 2004 | "Jukebox" | Jukebox | Song written by Infernal, Remee and Bent Fabricius-Bjerre and produced by Infernal for the Bent Fabric studio album Jukebox. |
| 2004 | "Everytime" | Jukebox | Song produced by Infernal. |
| 2004 | "Keep on Rising" | Jukebox | Song written by Infernal, Remee, Bent Fabricius-Bjerre and Carsten Jul and produced by Infernal. |
| 2004 | "Shake" | Jukebox | Song written by Infernal, Remee and Bent Fabricius-Bjerre and produced by Infernal. |
| 2004 | "Pusterummet" | Jukebox | Song written by Bent Fabricius-Bjerre and produced by Infernal. |
| 2004 | "Stop, stop" | MGP 2004 | Song written and produced by Infernal for the Danish junior singing competition MGP. Performed by Line Rømer. |
| 2005 | "Summer Lovin'" | When the Musikk Starts to Play | Song written by Infernal, Jon Nørgaard, Mikkel Torsting and Jesper Green for Musikk's debut studio album When the Musikk Starts to Play. |
| 2005 | "When the Musikk Starts to Play" | When the Musikk Starts to Play | Song written by Paw Lagermann, Janus Bosen Barnewitz, Thomas Sardorf, Navtej Singh Rehal, Kristian Paulsen, Mikkel Torsting and Jesper Green. |
| 2005 | "Get Serious 2003" | When the Musikk Starts to Play | Song produced by Paw Lagermann and Musikk. |
| 2005 | "Intro Conversation" | When the Musikk Starts to Play | Song written by Infernal and Eddie Chacon. Produced by Paw Lagermann and Musikk. |
| 2005 | "Would I Lie to You" | When the Musikk Starts to Play | Song produced by Paw Lagermann. Backing vocals by Lina Rafn. |
| 2005 | "Outro Conversation" | When the Musikk Starts to Play | Song written by Infernal and Eddie Chacon. Produced by Paw Lagermann and Musikk. |
| 2005 | "Shake That Booty" | When the Musikk Starts to Play | Song written by Infernal and produced by Paw Lagermann. Vocals by Lina Rafn. |
| 2006 | "Night People" | "Night People" (single) | Song written by Lina Rafn, Steen Thøttrup and Tim Andresen for the Professional Losers single "Night People". Vocals by Lina Rafn. |
| 2007 | "Smiling" | Jazz Is the Grass I Cut | Song written by Infernal, Moses Malone and De La Ray for the Jazzbox debut studio album Jazz Is the Grass I Cut. |
