= Electric Cabaret =

Studio album by Infernal
- Released: 11 August 2008
- Recorded: 2007–2008 at Infernal Studios; Powers Studio; Playground Studio; All of Music Studios; Ark Recording Studio
- Genres: Dance, pop, disco
- Length: 56:59 (Standard Edition); 76:26 (Taiwan Edition)
- Labels: Border Breakers, inf:rec
- Producers: Paw Lagermann, Lina Rafn

Infernal chronology
From Paris to Berlin) (2004)	Electric Cabaret (2008)	Fall from Grace (2010)

Singles from Electric Cabaret
- 1. "Downtown Boys" Released: 14 April 2008; 2. "Whenever You Need Me" Released: 4 August 2008; 3. "Electric Light" Released: 28 December 2008; 4. "Redefinition" Released: 27 April 2009

Alternative Cover

Professional ratings
Review scores
Source	Rating
DJDanmark	5/5 stars
DJz.dk	4/5 stars
dr.dk/Musik	2/6 stars
Ekstra Bladet	3/6 stars
GAFFA	2/6 stars
Jyllands-Posten	4/6 stars
MetroXpress	2/6 stars
Politiken	2/6 stars

Electric Cabaret is the fourth studio album by the Danish dance-pop duo Infernal. It was released on 11 August 2008 in Denmark.

In advance of the release, Infernal posted previews for five songs from the album (apart from the first two singles: "Downtown Boys" and "Whenever You Need Me") on 8 August, on their official website. The album debuted at number three in Denmark. It has since been certified two-times platinum by the International Federation of the Phonographic Industry (IFPI) for sales of 40,000 copies.

A Deluxe Edition of Electric Cabaret was released on 27 April 2009. It consists of the original album and a DVD with a live recording of Infernal's concert at the Skanderborg Festival in Denmark on 9 August 2008, plus backstage footage from the tour. The DVD also includes music videos for all four of the singles from the album. The live DVD is also available separately both physically and digitally from Infernal's music store.

A version of the album with a commentary track stretching over the entire album done in Danish by Paw & Lina, was also made available for download

== Track listings ==
=== Standard edition ===
No.	Title	Writer(s)	Length
1.	"Downtown Boys"	Paw Lagermann, Lina Rafn, Adam Powers	4:14
2.	"Whenever You Need Me"	Lagermann, Rafn, Powers	3:55
3.	"Electric Light"	Lagermann, Rafn, Powers	3:54
4.	"Punk Disco"	Lagermann, Rafn, Powers	3:45
5.	"Burning Up"	Lagermann, Rafn, Powers	3:31
6.	"Because Uhh"	Lagermann, Rafn, Nicolai Seebach, Rasmus Seebach	3:37
7.	"Days Full of Loving"	Lagermann, Rafn	3:40
8.	"Silver Surfer"	Lagermann, Rafn, Jimmy Dee	5:44
9.	"Redefinition"	Lagermann, Rafn	4:17
10.	"Dead or Alive"	Lagermann, Rafn, Thomas Troelsen	3:37
11.	"Back to Youth"	Lagermann, Rafn, Rune RK	4:08
12.	"Mr. Money"	Lagermann, Rafn, Fridolin Nordsø	3:20
13.	"I Feel Like Screaming"	Lagermann, Rafn, John-Victor	3:41
14.	"Behind the Music"	Lagermann, Rafn	5:36

=== Taiwan edition ===
Bonus Tracks
No.	Title	Length
15.	"Downtown Boys" (Andycap Remix 4:47)
16.	"Whenever You Need Me" (Hampenberg Pop Remix 5:15)
17.	"Keen on Disco" (Hit'n'Run 7" Disco Mix 3:32)
18.	"Keen on Disco" (Extended Version 5:40)

Bonus DVD
No.	Title	Length
1.	"Downtown Boys" (Music Video)
2.	"Whenever You Need Me" (Music Video)
3.	"Keen on Disco" (Music Video)

=== Deluxe Edition ===
CD
No.	Title	Length
1.	"Downtown Boys"	4:14
2.	"Whenever You Need Me"	3:55
3.	"Electric Light"	3:54
4.	"Punk Disco"	3:45
5.	"Burning Up"	3:31
6.	"Because Uhh"	3:37
7.	"Days Full of Loving"	3:40
8.	"Silver Surfer"	5:44
9.	"Redefinition"	4:17
10.	"Dead or Alive"	3:37
11.	"Back to Youth"	4:08
12.	"Mr. Money"	3:20
13.	"I Feel Like Screaming"	3:41
14.	"Behind the Music"	5:36

DVD
No.	Title	Writer(s)	Length
1.	"Summer Intro 2008"	Paw Lagermann, Lina Rafn, Anders Øhrstrøm, Jimmy Dee, Thomas Holmen	3:31
2.	"Dead or Alive"	Paw Lagermann, Lina Rafn, Thomas Troelsen	3:34
3.	"Hingland Fling"	Paw Lagermann, Lina Rafn, Søren Haahr	2:48
4.	"A to the B"	Paw Lagermann, Lina Rafn, Adam Powers	3:37
5.	"Keen on Disco"	Paw Lagermann, Lina Rafn, Adam Powers	4:30
6.	"Muzaik"	Paw Lagermann, Lina Rafn, Lars Bo Kujahn, Frank Juul	4:25
7.	"Sunrise"	Paw Lagermann, Lina Rafn, Tim Christensen, De La Ray, Adam Powers	5:40
8.	"Your Crown"	Nosie Katzmann	5:19
9.	"Self Control"	Giancarlo Bigazzi, Raffaele Riefoli, Steve Piccolo	4:21
10.	"Downtown Boys"	Paw Lagermann, Lina Rafn, Adam Powers	4:44
11.	"From Paris to Berlin"	Paw Lagermann, Lina Rafn, Adam Powers	4:25
12.	"Sorti de L'enfer"	Paw Lagermann, Lina Rafn, Søren Haahr, Kristian Paulsen	4:06
13.	"Kalinka"	Paw Lagermann, Lina Rafn, Søren Haahr	4:44
14.	"Banjo Thing"	Paw Lagermann, Lina Rafn, Søren Haahr	6:04
15.	"Ten Miles"	Paw Lagermann, Lina Rafn, Morgan Jalsing, Nicole Stockholm, Moses Malone	5:28
16.	"I Won't Be Crying"	Paw Lagermann, Lina Rafn, Adam Powers	6:38
17.	"Backstage Video"		14:15
18.	"Redefinition" (Music Video)		4:15
19.	"Electric Light" (Music Video)		4:01
20.	"Whenever You Need Me" (Music Video)		3:54
21.	"Downtown Boys" (Music Video)		4:13

== Charts and certifications ==
=== Charts ===
Chart (2008)	Peak position
Danish Albums Chart	2

=== Year-end charts ===
Chart (2008)	Position
Danish Albums Chart	29

=== Certifications ===
Country	Certification
Denmark	2× Platinum

== Release history ==
Region	Date	Format
Denmark	11 August 2008	CD, digital download (Standard edition)
Denmark	27 April 2009	CD & DVD, digital download (Deluxe edition)
Taiwan	9 April 2009	CD & DVD (Taiwan edition)
