= Whenever You Need Me (Infernal song) =

Single by Infernal

from the album Electric Cabaret
- Released: 4 August 2008
- Recorded: 2008; Infernal Studio and Powers Studio
- Genre: Pop
- Length: 3:56
- Label: Border Breakers
- Songwriters: Paw Lagermann, Lina Rafn, Adam Powers
- Producer: Infernal

Infernal singles chronology
"Downtown Boys" (2008)	"Whenever You Need Me" (2008)	"Electric Light" (2008)

Music video
- "Whenever You Need Me" on YouTube

"Whenever You Need Me" is a song by Danish pop duo Infernal. It was released on 4 August 2008 as the second single from the album Electric Cabaret. A 2-minute preview of the song was released on 1 August 2008 for members of their website and soon after was sent to radios across Denmark. The song peaked at #2 on the Danish Airplay Chart, and was certified gold based on digital download sales in Denmark.

== Track listings ==
- CD single
1. "Whenever You Need Me" (Original) — 3:56
2. "Whenever You Need Me" (Hampenberg Pop Remix) — 5:13
3. "Whenever You Need Me" (The Mac Project Club Mix) — 7:17
4. "Whenever You Need Me" (Flipside & Michael Parsberg Remix) — 7:41
5. "Whenever You Need Me" (Asle Club Mix) — 7:27
6. "Whenever You Need Me" (The Mac Project Club Dub) — 5:31
- Digital download
1. "Whenever You Need Me" (Original Version) — 3:58
2. "Whenever You Need Me" (Hampenberg Pop Remix) — 5:15
3. "Whenever You Need Me" (The Mac Project Club Mix) — 7:19
4. "Whenever You Need Me" (Flipside & Michael Parsberg Remix) — 7:43
5. "Whenever You Need Me" (Asle Club Mix) — 7:29
6. "Whenever You Need Me" (The Mac Project Dub) — 5:32

== Credits and personnel ==
- Written by P. Lagermann / L. Rafn / A. Powers.
- Performed by Infernal.
- Arranged, produced, recorded and mixed by Infernal at Infernal Studio and at Powers Studio.
- Additional vocal production and recording by Anders Øhrstrøm at Playground Studio.
- Additional vocals: Lina Rafn, Anders Øhrstrøm.
- Guitar: Jimmy Dee.
- Additional drums: Thomas Holmen.
- Additional keys: Adam Powers, Anders Øhrstrøm.
- Orchestral programming: Anders Øhrstrøm.
- Track 2: Remix & additional production by Morten Hampenberg.
- Track 3 & 6: Remix, additional production & programming The Mac Project. Additional keyboards by Aaron Emerson & Steve McGuinness.
- Track 4: Remix & additional production by A. Odden/M. Parsberg.
- Track 5: Remix & additional production by Asle Bjørn.
- A&R by Michael Guldhammer.
- Mastered by Jørgen Knub and Jan Eliasson at Audio Planet.
- Management by Alex Futtrup, AHM.
- Art direction & production: Loïc Maes.
- Graphic design: www.timandjohn.net
- Photographer: Pieter Henket.
- Styling: Aurélien Storny & Alexandre Misericordia.

== Music video ==
The music video was shot in New York City in June 2008, and was directed by Loic Maes, the same from their previous singles "Ten Miles", "I Won't Be Crying", "Downtown Boys", and the next third single, "Electric Light". It was released on 4 August 2008 to exclusive members of their official website.

== Charts ==
Chart (2008)	Peak position
Danish Airplay Chart	2
Danish Singles Chart	8
Tjeklisten	9
