= Jukebox (Bent Fabric album) =

Studio album by Bent Fabric
- Released: 19 April 2004 (Denmark); 24 January 2006 (US)
- Genre: Pop
- Length: 44:15
- Label: Universal Music Denmark; Hidden Beach (US)
- Producer: Paw Lagermann, Lina Rafn, The Shack, Jensen & Larrson, Stonebox, Anders Schumann, Dennis Dithmar, Spanish Fly

Singles from Jukebox
- 1. "Jukebox" Released: 2003; 2. "Shake" Released: 2003

Jukebox is an album by the Danish composer Bent Fabricius-Bjerre under his Bent Fabric alias. It was released on 19 April 2004 on Universal. The album is co-written with a wide range of Danish pop musicians such as Paw Lagermann and Lina Rafn of Infernal, Remee, Martin Brygmann, and Søren Rasted of Aqua.

== Track listing ==
=== Danish edition ===
No.	Title	Writer(s)	Producer(s)	Length
1.	"Jukebox"	Paw Lagermann, Lina Rafn, Remee, Bent Fabricius-Bjerre	Paw Lagermann, Lina Rafn	3:16
2.	"Everytime"	Migo Fecke, Markus Gahlen, Laura Zonka	Paw Lagermann, Lina Rafn	3:14
3.	"Keep on Rising"	Paw Lagermann, Lina Rafn, Remee, Bent Fabricius-Bjerre, Carsten Jul	Paw Lagermann, Lina Rafn	3:46
4.	"It Feels Like Love"	Martin Brygmann, Felix Campo III, Anders Schumann, Jacob Christensen, Bent Fabricius-Bjerre	The Shack	3:28
5.	"Shake"	Paw Lagermann, Lina Rafn, Remee, Bent Fabricius-Bjerre	Paw Lagermann, Lina Rafn	3:11
6.	"Just Be There For Me"	Søren N. Rasted, Bent Fabricius-Bjerre	Jensen and Larrson	4:27
7.	"Pusterummet"	Bent Fabricius-Bjerre	Paw Lagermann, Lina Rafn	3:23
8.	"Haven't You Noticed"	Martin Brygmann, Felix Campo III, Anders Schumann, Jacob Christensen, Bent Fabricius-Bjerre	The Shack	3:32
9.	"Relax Boy"	Bent Fabricius-Bjerre	Stonebox	2:29
10.	"Bam Boogie"	Dennis Dithmar, Anders Schumann, Philip Lundsgaard, Jesper Funch, Bent Fabricius-Bjerre	Dennis Dithmar, Anders Schumann	3:18
11.	"Bridges"	Michael Gammelgaard, Daniel Muschinsky, Remee, Bent Fabricius-Bjerre	Spanish Fly	3:39
12.	"Shake" (Spanish Fly Remix)			3:36
13.	"Jukebox" (Spanish Fly Remix)			3:08

=== US edition ===
No.	Title	Writer(s)	Producer(s)	Length
1.	"Bam Boogie"	Dennis Dithmar, Anders Schumann, Philip Lundsgaard, Jesper Funch, Bent Fabricius-Bjerre	Dennis Dithmar, Anders Schumann	3:08
2.	"Jukebox"	Paw Lagermann, Lina Rafn, Mikkel Remee Sigvardt, Bent Fabricius-Bjerre	Paw Lagermann, Lina Rafn	3:10
3.	"Haven't You Noticed"	Martin Brygmann, Felix Campo III, Anders Schumann, Jacob Christensen, Bent Fabricius-Bjerre	The Shack	3:31
4.	"Blowout"	Bent Fabricius-Bjerre	Paw Lagermann	3:18
5.	"Shake"	Paw Lagermann, Lina Rafn, Remee, Bent Fabricius-Bjerre	Paw Lagermann, Lina Rafn	3:07
6.	"It Feels Like Love"	Martin Brygmann, Felix Campo III, Anders Schumann, Jacob Christensen, Bent Fabricius-Bjerre	The Shack	3:24
7.	"Everytime"	Markus Gahlen, Migo Fecke, Laura Zonka	Paw Lagermann	3:10
8.	"Just Be There For Me"	Søren N. Rasted, Bent Fabricius-Bjerre	Jensen and Larrson	4:22
9.	"Relax Boy"	Bent Fabricius-Bjerre	Stonebox	2:27
10.	"Keep on Rising"	Paw Lagermann, Lina Rafn, Remee, Bent Fabricius-Bjerre, Carsten Jul	Paw Lagermann, Lina Rafn	3:44
11.	"Alley Cat" (Classical Version)	Bent Fabricius-Bjerre		2:20
12.	"Jukebox" (Ralphi's Juked Radio Edit)	Paw Lagermann, Lina Rafn, Remee, Bent Fabricius-Bjerre		3:44
13.	"Shake" (Spanish Fly Remix)	Paw Lagermann, Lina Rafn, Remee, Bent Fabricius-Bjerre		3:32
14.	"Jukebox" (Spanish Fly Remix)	Paw Lagermann, Lina Rafn, Remee, Bent Fabricius-Bjerre		3:07
15.	"Alley Cat" (Hit & Run Remix)	Bent Fabricius-Bjerre		8:38

== Credits and personnel ==
The following information are taken from the US edition.

#	Title	Notes
1	"Bam Boogie"	Written by Dennis Dithmar, Anders Schumann, Philip Lundsgaard, Jesper Funch, Bent Fabricius-Bjerre; Produced by Dennis Dithmar and Anders Schumann at C4 Studio; Mixed by Rune Zetterström; Piano by Bent Fabricius-Bjerre; Vocals by Corn Stick; All instruments by Dennis Dithmar and Anders Schumann; Additional piano and organ by Carsten Jul
2	"Jukebox"	Written by Paw Lagermann, Lina Rafn, Mikkel Remee Sigvardt & Bent Fabricius-Bjerre; Produced, arranged and mixed @ Infernal Studio by Paw Lagermann & Lina Rafn; Piano by Bent Fabricius-Bjerre; Vocals by Allan Vegenfeldt; Bass & guitar by Hannibal Gustafsson; Additional piano by Carsten Jul
3	"Haven't You Noticed"	Written by Martin Brygmann, Felix Campo III, Anders Schumann, Jacob Christensen, Bent Fabricius-Bjerre; Produced by The Shack @ C4 Studio; Mixed by Rune Zetterström; Piano by Bent Fabricius-Bjerre; Vocals by Liv Lykke; All instruments by Anders Schumann & Jacob Christensen; Additional keys by Poul Reimann; Trumpet and flugelhorn by Jesper Riis; Trombone by Nikolai Bøgelund Pedersen; Percussion by Anders Hansen
4	"Blowout"	Written by Bent Fabricius-Bjerre; Produced, arranged and mixed @ Infernal Studio by Paw Lagermann; Piano by Bent Fabricius-Bjerre; Bass & guitar by Hannibal Gustafsson; Additional piano by Carsten Jul
5	"Shake"	Written by Paw Lagermann, Lina Rafn, Mikkel Remee Sigvardt, Bent Fabricius-Bjerre; Produced, arranged and mixed @ Infernal Studio by Paw Lagermann & Lina Rafn; Piano by Bent Fabricius-Bjerre; Vocals by Allan Vegenfeldt; Bass & guitar by Hannibal Gustafsson; Additional piano by Carsten Jul; Additional vocals by Theis Andersen, Jesper Dukholt, Remee and Paw Lagermann
6	"It Feels Like Love"	Written by Martin Brygmann, Felix Campo III, Anders Schumann, Jacob Christensen, Bent Fabricius-Bjerre; Produced by The Shack @ C4 Studio; Mixed by Rune Zetterström; Piano by Bent Fabricius-Bjerre; Vocals by Martin Brygmann; Backing vocals by Liv Lykke and Tine Bjerggaard; All instruments by Anders Schumann and Jacob Christensen
7	"Everytime"	Written by Markus Gahlen, Migo Fecke, Laura Zonka; Produced, arranged and mixed / @ Infernal Studio by Paw Lagermann; Piano by Bent Fabricius-Bjerre; Vocals by Peter Frödin; Additional vocals by Brian Risberg Clausen; Bass guitar by Hannibal Gustafsson; Additional piano by Carsten Jul; Trumpet by Jesper Riis; Trombone by Nikolai Bøgelund Pedersen; Tenorsax by Michael Bladt
8	"Just Be There For Me"	Written by Søren N. Rasted & Bent Fabricius-Bjerre; Produced, arranged and mixed by Jensen and Larsson for Deekay; All instruments by Jensen and Larsson; Piano by Bent Fabricius-Bjerre; Vocals by Nellie Ettison; Backing vocals by Christina Undhjem; Percussion by Josh
9	"Relax Boy"	Written by Bent Fabricius-Bjerre; Produced by Stonebox; Vocal production and additional programming by Jan Winther; Mixed by Rune Zetterström; Piano by Bent Fabricius-Bjerre; Vocals by Nellie Ettison; Guitar by Vulvairihs; Trumpet and flugelhorn by Jesper Riis; Trombone by Nikolai Bøgelund Pedersen
10	"Keep on Rising"	Written by Paw Lagermann, Lina Rafn, Remee, Bent Fabricius-Bjerre, Carsten Nielsen; Produced, arranged and mixed @ Infernal Studio by Paw Lagermann and Lina Rafn; Piano by Bent Fabricius-Bjerre; Vocals by Allan Vegenfeldt; Guitar by Hannibal Gustafsson; Additional piano by Carsten Jul
11	"Alley Cat" (Classical Version)	Written by Bent Fabricius-Bjerre; Recorded and mixed at Focus Recording Studio in Copenhagen; Engineered and mixed by Hans Nielsen
12	"Jukebox" (Ralphi's Juked Radio Edit)	Written by Paw Lagermann, Lina Rafn, Mikkel Remee Sigvardt, Bent Fabricius-Bjerre; Remix produced and arranged by Ralphi Rosario; Additional programming by Craig J. Snider; Engineered and mixed by Ralphi Rosario; Recorded at Duplex Recording Chicago, IL
13	"Shake" (Spanish Fly Remix)	Written by Paw Lagermann, Lina Rafn, Mikkel Remee Sigvardt, Bent Fabricius-Bjerre
14	"Jukebox" (Spanish Fly Remix)	Written by Paw Lagermann, Lina Rafn, Mikkel Remee Sigvardt, Bent Fabricius-Bjerre
15	"Alley Cat" (Hit & Run Remix)	Written by Bent Fabricius-Bjerre; Remix and additional production by Daniel Kandi, courtesy of Border Breakers; Mixed and engineered by Daniel Kandi at K-Flozz Production Studio, Copenhagen, Denmark; Vocal recorded at TMS Studio by Jan Winther; Hit'n'Run appear courtesy of Border Breakers
