= You Receive Me =

Single by Infernal

from the album Muzaik
- B-side: "Humbled by Nature"
- Released: 2001
- Genre: Trance
- Length: 3:47
- Label: FLEX
- Songwriters: Paw Lagermann, Lina Rafn, Michelle Djarling
- Producers: Infernal, Michelle Djarling

Infernal singles chronology
"Muzaik" (2001)	"You Receive Me" (2001)	"Let Me Hear You Say Yeah" (2002)

You Receive Me is a song by the Danish dance-pop duo Infernal. It was released as the lead single from the album Muzaik, a revised edition of their second studio album, Waiting for Daylight, in 2001. The song was written by Paw Lagermann, Lina Rafn and Michelle Djarling as the theme song to the second season of the reality television show Big Brother Denmark.

== Track listings ==
CD single
No.	Title	Length
1.	"You Receive Me" (Original Mix)	3:47
2.	"You Receive Me" (Extended Mix)	5:43
3.	"You Receive Me" (DJ Asle Remix)	8:13
4.	"You Receive Me" (DJ Asle Remix Edit)	4:03
5.	"Humbled by Nature" (Original Mix)	6:50
6.	"Humbled by Nature" (Extended House Mix)	5:59
7.	"Humbled by Nature" (Double T & Disse Club Mix)	6:57

CD single
No.	Title	Length
1.	"You Receive Me" (Original Mix)	3:47
2.	"You Receive Me" (Extended Mix)	5:43
3.	"You Receive Me" (DJ Asle Remix)	8:13
4.	"You Receive Me" (DJ Asle Remix Edit)	4:03
5.	"You Receive Me" (Zilk's Reality Mix)	6:14

== Credits and personnel ==
- Written by Paw Lagermann, Lina Rafn and Michelle Djarling
- Produced by Infernal and Michelle Djarling
- Mastered by Michael Pfundheller @ Flex Studio
- "Humbled by Nature": written by Paw Lagermann, Lina Rafn and Adam Powers. Produced by Infernal

== Charts ==
Chart (2001)	Peak position
Danish Singles Chart	12
