= Fall from Grace (Infernal album) =

Studio album by Infernal
- Released: 27 September 2010
- Recorded: 2009–2010; Infernal Studio, Copenhagen, Denmark; Playground Studio, Roskilde, Denmark
- Length: 48:51
- Label: Border Breakers, inf:rec
- Producer: Paw Lagermann, Lina Rafn, Simon Borch, Anders Heiberg

Infernal chronology
Electric Cabaret (2008)	Fall from Grace (2010)	Put Your Fucking Hands Up (2013)

Singles from Fall from Grace
- 1. "Love Is All..." Released: 10 May 2010; 2. "Alone, Together" Released: 13 September 2010

Fall from Grace is the fifth studio album by the Danish dance duo Infernal. It was released in Denmark on 27 September 2010. It was preceded by the lead single "Love Is All..." on 10 May 2010. "Love Is All..." peaked at number six on the Danish Singles Chart. The second single, "Alone, Together", was released on 13 September 2010.

The album debuted at number nine on the Danish Albums Chart on 8 October 2010, selling 1,850 copies in its two first weeks on the chart. It has since been certified gold by the International Federation of the Phonographic Industry (IFPI) for shipments of 10,000 copies in Denmark.

== Track listing ==
All songs produced by Paw Lagermann and Lina Rafn, with additional production on "Club Erotic" by Simon Borch and Anders Heiberg.

No.	Title	Writer(s)	Length
1.	"Fall from Grace"	Paw Lagermann, Lina Rafn, Adam Powers	4:26
2.	"Biting the Bullet"	Lagermann, Rafn, Michael Tonny Christensen, Alfred Tuohey, Mimoza Blinsson, Powers	5:10
3.	"Love Is All..."	Lagermann, Rafn, Powers	3:31
4.	"Weird How You..."	Lagermann, Rafn, Asle Bjørn, Lena Bjørvig	4:21
5.	"Alone, Together"	Lagermann, Rafn, Powers	4:11
6.	"Gunshot"	Lagermann, Rafn, Thomas Troelsen	3:53
7.	"The Weekend and I"	Lagermann, Rafn, Troelsen	3:48
8.	"Materialize!"	Lagermann, Rafn, Morten Dalgaard, Nathan Duvall, Niclas Lundin	3:41
9.	"Circussed"	Lagermann, Rafn, Powers	3:21
10.	"Plastic Fantastic"	Lagermann, Rafn, Troelsen	3:42
11.	"Club Erotic"	Lagermann, Rafn, Simon Borch, Anders Heiberg	4:03
12.	"Think Cavalli, Baby"	Lagermann, Rafn	4:46

iTunes bonus track
No.	Title	Length
13.	"Alone, Together" (Svenstrup & Vendelboe Remix)	6:04

== Charts and certifications ==
=== Charts ===
Chart (2010)	Peak position
Danish Albums Chart	9

=== Certifications ===
Country	Certification
Denmark	Gold
