= Cheap Trick Kinda' Girl =

Single by Infernal

from the album From Paris to Berlin
- B-side: "From Paris to Berlin"
- Released: 14 November 2005
- Recorded: 2004
- Genre: Electronica; house; dance
- Length: 3:20
- Label: Central Station
- Songwriters: Lagermann, Rafn, Jesper Green
- Producers: Lina Rafn, Paw Lagermann

Infernal singles chronology
"Keen on Disco" (2005)	"Cheap Trick Kinda' Girl" (2005)	"A to the B" (2006)

"Cheap Trick Kinda' Girl" is the fourth single from Danish dance/house duo Infernal. Released from their most successful album to date, From Paris to Berlin, in Australia, it was released as the second single and contained "From Paris to Berlin" as a double A-Side.

== Track listing ==
CD single (AUS)

1. "Cheap Trick Kinda' Girl" [radio edit] – 3:17
2. "From Paris To Berlin" [radio version] – 3:27
3. "Cheap Trick Kinda' Girl" [extended version] – 5:56
4. "From Paris To Berlin" [Dj Aligator Meets Mr. President club mix] – 6:35

== Charts ==
Chart (2005)	Peak position
Australian ARIA Singles Chart	28
