= Klosteret =

Coordinates: 55.6830°N 12.5751°E

Klosteret is a nightclub located at Hauser Plads 32 in Copenhagen, Denmark. With an area of circa 2000 square meters, it is the largest night club in Denmark. Klosteret was opened as a night club in February 2015 by the members of the pop group Infernal, Lina Rafn and Paw Lagermann. Infernal owned more than half the place. In the beginning of 2016, the place switched owners and is now called SGK by Fabio Klosteret 2.0.

== History ==
The night club has got its name from the building, which is a 700-year-old monastery. Through centuries, it has functioned as a chapel, a hospital (St. Gertrude's Hospital), a trading house and a warehouse.

Before Klosteret was opened as a night club, it served as the restaurant Saint Gertruds Kloster (in 2013-2014: Gertruds Kælder), and during the years the place had several different owners. The restaurant was closed in January 2014 due to vandalism.
