= Redefinition (song) =

Single by Infernal

from the album Electric Cabaret
- Released: 27 April 2009
- Studio: Infernal Studio, Powers Studio, Playground Studio
- Genre: Dance-pop, pop
- Length: 2:51
- Label: Border Breakers, inf:rec
- Songwriters: Paw Lagermann, Lina Rafn
- Producer: Infernal

Infernal singles chronology
"Electric Light" (2008)	"Redefinition" (2009)	"Love Is All..." (2010)

"Redefinition" is a song by the Danish dance-pop duo Infernal. It was the fourth and final single released from their 2008 album Electric Cabaret on 27 April 2009 after undoubtedly being the favourite track among fans. Unlike the three previous singles, "Redefinition" is not co-written by Adam Powers. It is also the only single from the album that did not enter the charts.

Infernal released the music video of the song to registered users on their website, and later to the video-sharing website YouTube. The song debuted on Danish radio stations via a promotional CD in April 2009. It is the opening song of "Salotto", a discopub in Varese.

The music video was filmed on 3 March 2009 in Manhattan, New York City and was directed by Loïc Maes.

== Track listing ==
No.	Title	Length
1.	"Redefinition" (Radio Edit)	2:51
2.	"Redefinition" (Extended Version)	6:11
3.	"Redefinition" (Jason Gault Remix)	4:10
4.	"Redefinition" (Jack Dizzle Remix)	5:59
5.	"Redefinition" (Morten Hampenberg Remix)	4:31
6.	"Redefinition" (Laywell Remix)	4:58
7.	"Redefinition" (Barylak's Club Mix)	5:45

== Personnel ==
- Written by Paw Lagermann, Lina Rafn
- Performed by Infernal
- Arranged, produced, recorded and mixed by Infernal at Infernal Studio and at Powers Studio
- Additional vocal production and recording by Anders Øhrstrøm at Playground Studio
- Additional vocals by Paw Lagermann, Lina Rafn, Anders Øhrstrøm, Pernille Kehlert Øhrstrøm
- Guitar by Jimmy Dee
- Additional drums by Thomas Holmen
- Additional keyboards by Anders Øhrstrøm
- Orchestral programming by Anders Øhrstrøm
- Mastered by Jan Eliasson at Audio Planet
- "Redefinition" (Jason Gault Remix): Remix and additional production by Jason Gault for Traxstarz BV at Gaultmine Studio
- "Redefinition" (Jack Dizzle Remix): Remix and additional production by Casper Østergaard at JD Studio, Copenhagen
- "Redefinition" (Morten Hampenberg Remix): Remix and additional production by Morten Hampenberg
- "Redefinition" (Laywell Remix): Remix and additional production by Laywell
- "Redefinition" (Barylak's Club Mix): Remix and additional production by Daniel Barylak
