= Downtown Boys (song) =

Single by Infernal

from the album Electric Cabaret
- Released: April 14, 2008
- Recorded: 2008; Infernal Studio and Powers Studio
- Length: 4:14
- Label: Border Breakers
- Songwriters: Paw Lagermann, Lina Rafn, Adam Powers
- Producer: Infernal

Infernal singles chronology
| "Ten Miles" (2007) | "Downtown Boys" (2008) | "Whenever You Need Me" (2008) |

"Downtown Boys" is a song by Danish duo Infernal. It was released on April 14, 2008 as the lead single from the album Electric Cabaret. The duo performed the new song on Boogie Prisen, a Danish award show on April 12, 2008. The song became available for download and was sent to radio stations on April 14. The song gained platinum certification in Denmark, based on digital downloads only, on July 9, 2008. It was Infernal's first single to reach #1 at the Danish Airplay Chart, and remained on top for four weeks. "Downtown Boys" was the ninth most played song on Danish radio stations in 2008.

== Track listings ==
- CD promo single 1
1. "Downtown Boys" (Original Version) — 4:14
2. "Downtown Boys" (Extended Version) — 6:48
- CD promo single 2
1. "Downtown Boys" (Tim Andresen Remix) — 7:12
2. "Downtown Boys" (Tim Andresen Dub) — 6:28
3. "Downtown Boys" (Thomas Vendelboe's Afterhours Remix) — 7:00
4. "Downtown Boys" (Copenhagen Clubbers Remix) — 5:50
- CD promo maxi single/Digital download
1. "Downtown Boys" (Original Version) — 4:14
2. "Downtown Boys" (Extended Version) — 6:48
3. "Downtown Boys" (Andycap Remix) — 4:47
4. "Downtown Boys" (Thomas Vendelboe's Afterhours Mix) — 6:58
5. "Downtown Boys" (Michael Parsberg & Flipside Remix) — 6:23

== Credits and personnel ==
- Written by P. Lagermann / L. Rafn / A. Powers.
- Performed by Infernal.
- Arranged, produced, recorded & mixed by Infernal at Infernal Studio & at Powers Studio.
- Additional vocal production & recording by Anders Øhrstrøm at Playground Studio.
- Additional vocal, vocoder & keyboard by Anders Øhrstrøm.
- Additional vocal by Pernille Øhrstrøm.
- Guitars by Jimmy Dee.
- Additional drums by Thomas Holmen.
- Track 3: Remix & additional production by Andreas Schultz (Andycap) & Mathias Lundfren.
- Track 4: Remix & additional production by Thomas Vendelboe.
- Track 5: Remix & additional production by A. Odden / M. Parsberg.
- A&R by Michael Guldhammer.
- Mastered by Jan Eliasson at Audio Planet.
- Art direction & production: Loïc Maes.
- Graphic design: timandjohn.net
- Photographer: Pieter Henket.
- Styling: Aurélien Storny & Alexandre Misericordia.
- Management by Alex Futtrup, AHM.

== Music video ==
The video was shot in New York from April 9 to April 11, 2008. It was directed by Loic Maes, the same director of the videos for their previous singles Ten Miles and I Won't Be Crying.

== Charts ==
| Chart (2008) | Peak position |
|---|---|
| Danish Airplay Chart | 1 |
| Danish Dance Chart | 2 |
| Danish Singles Chart | 2 |
| NLP Singles Chart | 1 |
| Tjeklisten | 1 |
