= From Paris to Berlin (album) =

Studio album by Infernal
- Released: 23 August 2004
- Genres: House; dance-pop; Europop
- Length: 53:23
- Labels: Border Breakers, inf:rec
- Producers: Infernal, Adam Powers

Infernal chronology
Muzaik (2001)	From Paris to Berlin (2004)	Electric Cabaret (2008)

Singles from From Paris to Berlin
- 1. "Banjo Thing" Released: 2003; 2. "Cheap Trick Kinda' Girl" Released: 2005; 3. "From Paris to Berlin" Released: 2004; 4. "Keen on Disco" Released: 2005; 5. "A to the B" Released: 2005; 6. "Ten Miles" Released: 2006; 7. "Self Control" Released: 2006; 8. "I Won't Be Crying" Released: 2007

Alternative covers
- International Edition

Professional ratings
Review scores
Source	Rating
Teentoday.co.uk	3/5 stars

From Paris to Berlin is the third studio album by Danish dance-pop duo Infernal. It was released on 23 August 2004 through Border Breakers in Denmark. An international edition of the album was also released on 6 September 2005 for the European countries. It was released in the United Kingdom and Ireland on 28 May 2007 following the success of the single "From Paris to Berlin", which reached number two on the UK Singles Chart in May 2006.

The album has been certified two times platinum by the International Federation of the Phonographic Industry (IFPI) for shipments of 60,000 units in Denmark.

== Track listings ==
- All tracks produced by Infernal, except "Self Control" additional production by Adam Powers.

=== Standard edition ===
No.	Title	Writer(s)	Length
1.	"Big Ride Fuckers (Intro)"	Paw Lagermann, Lina Rafn	2:13
2.	"From Paris to Berlin"	Lagermann, Rafn, Adam Powers	3:31
3.	"I Took a Ride (Fairytale)" (featuring Adam Powers)	Lagermann, Rafn, Powers	3:19
4.	"Keen on Disco"	Lagermann, Rafn, Powers	3:51
5.	"Cheap Trick - The Silent Movie (Intro)"	Lagermann, Rafn, Jesper Green	0:52
6.	"Cheap Trick Kinda' Girl"	Lagermann, Rafn, Green	3:20
7.	"Ultimate Control" (featuring John Rock)	Lagermann, Rafn, Jon Nørgaard	3:20
8.	"Vienna"	Midge Ure, Chris Cross, Warren Cann, Billy Currie	4:44
9.	"Dressed in Blue"	Lagermann, Rafn, Michelle Djarling	3:24
10.	"Careful with the Boys"	Lagermann, Rafn, Djarling	3:24
11.	"Deeper Still"	Lagermann, Rafn	4:39
12.	"Bass Driven Music"	Lagermann, Rafn	4:48
13.	"Balagan (Hava Nagila)" (featuring Uri)	Lagermann, Rafn	5:16
14.	"Banjo Thing" (featuring Red$tar)	Lagermann, Rafn, Søren Haahr	3:52
15.	"Sunday Morning March"	Lagermann, Rafn	2:52

European edition (2004)
No.	Title	Writer(s)	Length
1.	"Big Ride Fuckers (Intro)"	Paw Lagermann, Lina Rafn	2:13
2.	"From Paris to Berlin"	Lagermann, Rafn, Adam Powers	3:31
3.	"I Took a Ride (Fairytale)" (featuring Adam Powers)	Lagermann, Rafn, Powers	3:19
4.	"Keen on Disco"	Lagermann, Rafn, Powers	3:51
5.	"Cheap Trick Kinda' Girl"	Lagermann, Rafn, Green	3:20
6.	"Ultimate Control" (featuring John Rock)	Lagermann, Rafn, Jon Nørgaard	3:20
7.	"Vienna"	Midge Ure, Chris Cross, Warren Cann, Billy Currie	4:44
8.	"Dressed in Blue"	Lagermann, Rafn, Michelle Djarling	3:24
9.	"Careful with the Boys"	Lagermann, Rafn, Djarling	3:24
10.	"Deeper Still"	Lagermann, Rafn	4:39
11.	"Bass Driven Music"	Lagermann, Rafn	4:48
12.	"Sunday Morning March"	Lagermann, Rafn	2:52

=== International / Australian Tour Edition (2005/06) ===
Disc one
No.	Title	Writer(s)	Length
1.	"Fairytale"	Lagermann, Rafn, Powers	3:34
2.	"A to the B"	Lagermann, Rafn, Powers	3:36
3.	"Ten Miles"	Lagermann, Rafn, Morgan Jalsing, Nicole Stockholm, Moses Malone	3:30
4.	"From Paris to Berlin"	Lagermann, Rafn, Adam Powers	3:31
5.	"Peace Inside"	Lagermann, Rafn, Kristian Paulsen, Powers	3:25
6.	"Vienna"	Midge Ure, Chris Cross, Warren Cann, Billy Currie	4:45
7.	"Dressed in Blue"	Lagermann, Rafn, Michelle Djarling	3:24
8.	"Ultimate Control" (featuring John Rock)	Lagermann, Rafn, Jon Nørgaard	3:20
9.	"Keen on Disco" (late night mix)	Lagermann, Rafn, Powers	4:46
10.	"Cheap Trick Kinda' Girl"	Lagermann, Rafn, Jesper Green	3:20
11.	"Loved Like a Maniac"	Lagermann, Rafn	3:37
12.	"Deeper Still"	Lagermann, Rafn	4:40
13.	"Sunday Morning March"	Lagermann, Rafn	2:52

Disc two: Bonus CD
No.	Title	Writer(s)	Length
1.	"From Paris to Berlin" (Uniting Nations remix)		6:36
2.	"From Paris to Berlin" (DJ Aligator club mix)		6:38
3.	"Keen on Disco" (Hit'n'Run 12" disco mix)		3:33
4.	"Keen on Disco" (Original)		3:51
5.	"Careful with the Boys"		3:23
6.	"Bass Driven Music"		4:48
7.	"Balagan (Hava Nagila)" (featuring Uri)		5:16
8.	"Kalinka" (live version)		4:54
9.	"Your Crown" (live version)		3:25
10.	"Sunrise" (live version)		5:28
11.	"Banjo Thing" (featuring Red$tar) (live version)		5:14
12.	"From Paris to Berlin" (music video)	Lagermann, Rafn	3:36
13.	"Keen on Disco"	music video	3:54

=== Japanese edition (2006) ===
CD
No.	Title	Writer(s)	Length
1.	"From Paris to Berlin"	Lagermann, Rafn, Adam Powers	3:31
2.	"Self Control"	Giancarlo Bigazzi, Steve Piccolo, Raffaele Riefoli	3:38
3.	"A to the B"	Lagermann, Rafn, Powers	3:36
4.	"Ten Miles"	Lagermann, Rafn, Morgan Jalsing, Nicole Stockholm, Moses Malone	3:30
5.	"Hey Hello!"	Lagermann, Rafn, Simon Borch	3:18
6.	"I Won't Be Crying"	Lagermann, Rafn, Powers, Martin Gore	3:28
7.	"Fairytale"	Lagermann, Rafn, Powers	3:34
8.	"Peace Inside"	Lagermann, Rafn, Kristian Paulsen, Powers	3:24
9.	"Vienna"	Midge Ure, Chris Cross, Warren Cann, Billy Currie	4:45
10.	"Dressed in Blue"	Lagermann, Rafn, Michelle Djarling	3:24
11.	"Ultimate Control" (featuring John Rock)	Lagermann, Rafn, Jon Nørgaard	3:20
12.	"Keen on Disco" (Hit'n'Run 12" disco mix)	Lagermann, Rafn, Powers	3:33
13.	"Sunrise"	Tim Christensen, Lagermann, Rafn, De La Ray, Adam Powers	3:57
14.	"Careful with the Boys"	Lagermann, Rafn, Djarling	3:23
15.	"Cheap Trick Kinda' Girl"	Lagermann, Rafn, Jesper Green	3:20
16.	"Banjo Thing" (featuring Red$tar)	Lagermann, Rafn, Søren Haahr	3:52
17.	"Sunday Morning March"	Lagermann, Rafn	2:52
18.	"From Paris to Berlin" (DJ Aligator club mix)	Lagermann, Rafn, Adam Powers	6:38

DVD
No.	Title	Length
1.	"From Paris to Berlin"	3:31
2.	"Self Control"
3.	"A to the B"

=== Polish edition (2007) ===
CD
No.	Title	Writer(s)	Length
1.	"I Won't Be Crying"	Lagermann, Rafn, Powers, Martin Gore	3:30
2.	"Self Control"	Giancarlo Bigazzi, Steve Piccolo, Raffaele Riefoli	3:30
3.	"Keen on Disco"	Lagermann, Rafn, Powers	4:46
4.	"From Paris to Berlin"	Lagermann, Rafn, Adam Powers	3:31
5.	"Fairytale"	Lagermann, Rafn, Powers	3:34
6.	"A to the B"	Lagermann, Rafn, Powers	3:36
7.	"Ten Miles"	Lagermann, Rafn, Morgan Jalsing, Nicole Stockholm, Moses Malone	3:30
8.	"Peace Inside"	Lagermann, Rafn, Kristian Paulsen, Powers	3:25
9.	"Vienna"	Midge Ure, Chris Cross, Warren Cann, Billy Currie	4:45
10.	"Dressed in Blue"	Lagermann, Rafn, Michelle Djarling	3:24
11.	"Ultimate Control" (featuring John Rock)	Lagermann, Rafn, Jon Nørgaard	3:20
12.	"Keen on Disco" (late night mix)	Lagermann, Rafn, Powers	4:46
13.	"Cheap Trick Kinda' Girl"	Lagermann, Rafn, Jesper Green	3:20
14.	"Loved Like a Maniac"	Lagermann, Rafn	3:37
15.	"Deeper Still"	Lagermann, Rafn	4:40
16.	"Sunday Morning March"	Lagermann, Rafn	2:52
17.	"Hey Hello!"	Lagermann, Rafn, Simon Borch	3:18
18.	"This Little Secret"	Lagermann, Rafn, Powers	2:52

DVD
No.	Title	Length
1.	"I Won't Be Crying"
2.	"Self Control"
3.	"Keen on Disco"
4.	"From Paris to Berlin"	3;31
5.	"Fairytale"

=== UK / Danish re-release edition (2007) ===
CD
No.	Title	Writer(s)	Length
1.	"From Paris to Berlin"	Lagermann, Rafn, Adam Powers	3:31
2.	"Hey Hello!"	Lagermann, Rafn, Simon Borch	3:17
3.	"Self Control"	Giancarlo Bigazzi, Steve Piccolo, Raffaele Riefoli	3:37
4.	"Ten Miles"	Lagermann, Rafn, Morgan Jalsing, Nicole Stockholm, Moses Malone	3:29
5.	"I Won't Be Crying"	Lagermann, Rafn, Powers, Martin Gore	3:25
6.	"Fairytale"	Lagermann, Rafn, Powers	3:33
7.	"A to the B"	Lagermann, Rafn, Powers	3:36
8.	"Peace Inside"	Lagermann, Rafn, Kristian Paulsen, Powers	3:25
9.	"Ultimate Control"	Lagermann, Rafn, Jon Nørgaard	3:21
10.	"Dressed in Blue"	Lagermann, Rafn, Michelle Djarling	3:23
11.	"Keen on Disco"	Lagermann, Rafn, Powers	3:50
12.	"Deeper Still"	Lagermann, Rafn	4:38
13.	"This Little Secret"	Lagermann, Rafn, Powers	4:14

Spanish bonus track
No.	Title	Writer(s)	Length
14.	"Vienna"	Midge Ure, Chris Cross, Warren Cann, Billy Currie	4:45

Russian bonus tracks
No.	Title	Writer(s)	Length
14.	"I Won't Be Crying" (Beatfreakz club mix)	Lagermann, Rafn, Powers, Gore	7:12
15.	"Self Control" (Soul Seekerz remix)	Bigazzi, Piccolo, Riefoli	7:41
16.	"Ten Miles" (N-Joy remix)	Lagermann, Rafn, Jalsing, Stockholm, Malone	4:18
17.	"Self Control" (bonus video)	Bigazzi, Piccolo, Riefoli
18.	"I Won't Be Crying" (bonus video)	Lagermann, Rafn, Powers, Gore

DVD: Taiwanese edition
No.	Title	Length
1.	"I Won't Be Crying" (music video)	7:12
2.	"Self Control" (music video)	7:41
3.	"From Paris to Berlin" (music video)	4:18
4.	"A to the B" (music video)

=== International Re-Edition (CD+DVD) ===
CD

1. "I Won't Be Crying" – 3:27
2. "Self Control" – 3:38
3. "Keen on Disco" – 3:50
4. "From Paris to Berlin" – 3:31
5. "Fairytale" – 3:33
6. "A to the B" – 3:36
7. "Ten Miles" – 3:29
8. "Peace Inside" – 3:24
9. "Vienna" – 4:44
10. "Dressed in Blue" – 3:24
11. "Ultimate Control" – 3:20
12. "Keen on Disco" (Late Night Mix) – 4:46
13. "Cheap Trick Kinda Girl" – 3:20
14. "Loved Like a Maniac" – 3:38
15. "Deeper Still" – 4:41
16. "Sunday Morning March" – 2:52
17. "Hey Hello!" (International Bonus Track) – 3:18
18. "This Little Secret" (International Bonus Track) – 4:14

DVD

1. "From Paris to Berlin" (Music Video) - 4:37
2. "Keen on Disco" (Music Video)
3. "A to the B" (Music Video)
4. "Self Control" (Music Video)
5. "I Won't Be Crying" (Music Video)
6. Interview
7. Photo gallery

=== US Edition (2CD) ===
Disc 1

1. "From Paris to Berlin" – 3:31
2. "Hey Hello!" – 3:20
3. "Self Control" – 3:40
4. "Ten Miles" – 3:31
5. "I Won't Be Crying" – 3:29
6. "Fairytale" – 3:35
7. "A to the B" – 3:39
8. "Peace Inside" – 3:26
9. "Vienna" – 4:46
10. "Dressed in Blue" – 3:26
11. "Keen on Disco" – 3:53
12. "This Little Secret" – 4:17
13. "Ultimate Control" – 3:24
14. "Cheap Trick Kinda Girl" – 3:22
15. "Careful with the Boys" – 3:24
16. "Loved Like a Maniac" – 3:38
17. "Deeper Still" – 4:41
18. "Sunday Morning March" – 2:52

Disc Two

1. "I Won't Be Crying" (Extended Version) – 5:38
2. "I Won't Be Crying" (BeatFreakz Club Mix) – 7:13
3. "I Won't Be Crying" (Inf: Skru Op! Mix) – 7:06
4. "From Paris to Berlin" (Extended Version) – 6:06
5. "From Paris to Berlin" (Uniting Nations Remix) – 6:37
6. "From Paris to Berlin" (DJ Aligator Remix) – 6:38
7. "From Paris to Berlin" (Inf: Club Mix) – 6:26
8. "Self Control" (Extended Version) – 6:03
9. "Ten Miles" (Weekend Wonderz Remix) – 7:22
10. "Ten Miles" (Spank! @ the High Mile Club Mix) – 5:30
11. "Keen on Disco" (Hit 'n' Run 12" Disco Mix) – 5:29
12. "A to the B" (Cato Azul Remix) – 6:43

Notes

- "Keen on Disco" contains a beat sample "Vil du danse med mig" by TV-2 (1984).
- "I Won't Be Crying" contains a sample from "Strangelove" by Depeche Mode (1987).

== Singles ==
Year	Song	Released
2003	"Banjo Thing" (featuring Red$tar)	(Denmark)
2005	"From Paris to Berlin"	(Australia) (Austria) (Denmark) (Finland) (France) (Germany) (Netherlands) (Norway) (Portugal) (Spain) (Sweden) (Switzerland) (Hungary)
2005	"Keen on Disco"	(Denmark) (Finland) (Spain) (Sweden)
2005	"Cheap Trick Kinda Girl" ^{1}	(Australia)
2005	"A to the B"	(Australia) (Denmark) (France)
2006	"Ten Miles" ^{2}	(Denmark) (Finland) (France) (Spain) (Turkey)
2006	"From Paris to Berlin" ^{3}	(Republic of Ireland) (United Kingdom)
2006	"Self Control"	(Australia) (Denmark) (Finland) (Republic of Ireland) (Sweden) (United Kingdom)
2007	"I Won't Be Crying"	(Australia) (Denmark) (Finland) (Netherlands)

Notes:

1. Released as a Double-A side with "From Paris to Berlin."
2. Promo only.
3. Re-released in the UK & Ireland only.

== Charts and certifications ==
=== Charts ===
Chart (2005–2006)	Peak position
Denmark Albums Chart	20
Denmark End of Year Albums Chart	82
Finland Albums Chart	29
Chart (2007)	Peak position
UK Albums Chart	44
Denmark Albums Chart	1
Denmark End of Year Albums Chart	27

=== Certifications ===
Region	Certification	Certified units/sales
Denmark (IFPI Danmark)	4× Platinum	80,000^{‡}
^{‡} Sales+streaming figures based on certification alone.
