= Electric Light (song) =

Single by Infernal

from the album Electric Cabaret
- Released: 28 December 2008
- Recorded: Infernal Studio and Powers Studio
- Genre: Pop
- Length: 3:55
- Label: Border Breakers
- Songwriters: Paw Lagermann, Lina Rafn, Adam Powers
- Producer: Infernal

Infernal singles chronology
"Whenever You Need Me" (2008)	"Electric Light" (2008)	"Redefinition" (2009)

"Electric Light" is a song by Danish pop duo Infernal. It was released as the third single from the album Electric Cabaret, on 28 December 2008. "Electric Light" was the third most played song on Danish radio stations in 2009.

== Track listing ==
1. "Electric Light" (Original Version) — 3:55
2. "Electric Light" (Gorm Jay Soft Club Mix) — 4:53
3. "Electric Light" (Hampenberg Club Mix) — 5:32
4. "Electric Light" (inf:klårb Mix) — 8:33
5. "Electric Light" (Twin Maniacs Remix) — 8:19

== Charts ==
Chart (2009)	Peak position
Danish Airplay Chart	4
Danish Singles Chart	5

=== Year-end ===
Chart (2009)	Position
Danish Singles Chart	43

== Music video ==
The music video was shot in Brooklyn, New York City and directed by Loïc Maes who also directed the previous videos from the Electric Cabaret album.
