= A to the B =

Single by Infernal

from the album From Paris to Berlin
- Released: 6 March 2006 (AUS)
- Recorded: 2004
- Genre: Pop, dance
- Length: 3:36
- Songwriters: Lagermann, Rafn, Powers
- Producers: Niels Ekner, Jesper Green, Lars Bo Kujahn, Guldhammer (executive)

Infernal singles chronology
"Cheap Trick Kinda' Girl" (2005)	"A to the B" (2006)	"Ten Miles" (2006)

Music video
- "A to the B" on YouTube

"A to the B" is a single by Danish dance/house duo Infernal from the album From Paris to Berlin. Released in the beginning of 2006, the single peaked at number 49 on the French singles chart and number 54 in Australia.

== Music video ==
The music video of "A to the B" illustrates the fictional character, Superman (played by Paw Lagermann) flying through the air.

At the beginning, he is seen trying to seduce some dancing women, but this seems to fail. We then see a different woman, wearing a wolfskin standing at the top of a skyscraper (we assume this to be Superman's lover — played by Lina Rafn). In an attempt to get Superman's attention, she 'falls' off the skyscraper. Hearing her scream, he runs off and grabs her, returning her safely to the ground. He then leaves her and starts dancing with the other women. The woman wearing the wolfskin walks away, and we see her sitting on a bench, picking the petals off a flower.

We then see her trying to get Superman's attention by tying herself to a railway track. Superman saves her again by lifting the train of the track, but does not return to her - he instead returns to where the women were dancing, but are no longer there. A TV close by narrates - "It seems to me that all us strong, independent women make men lazy. All of a sudden, they think they don't have to court us properly! But boys, let me tell you something, there is nothing like a man who knows how to treat a lady."

We now see a succession of jumping off the skyscraper from Superman's lover - she seems adamant that she will get his attention. The second time she jumps off, Superman does not leave her, but takes her to his Fortress of Solitude. His lover walks into crystals, and comes out as a Superwoman. Superman is seen flying off, while Superwoman experiments with her new "vision". One vision shows her the Eiffel Tower, and another shows her Sydney, Australia while a man preparing to take a shower.

== Track listings ==
CD single (Finland)

1. "A to the B" [radio edit] – 3:38
2. "A to the B" [extended version] – 6:14

CD single (EU)

1. "A to the B" [radio edit] – 3:37
2. "A to the B" [extended version] – 6:15
3. "A to the B" [Cato Azul remix] – 6:43
4. "A to the B" [Asle's Full Blown vocal mix] – 5:57

CD single 2 (EU)

1. "A to the B" [radio edit] – 3:37
2. "A to the B" [extended version] – 6:15
3. "A to the B" [Cato Azul remix] – 6:43
4. "A to the B" [Asle's Full Blown vocal mix] – 5:57
5. "From Paris to Berlin" [United Nations Remix] – 6:36
6. "From Paris to Berlin" [Hoxton Whores Remix] – 6:53

== Charts ==
Chart (2006)	Peak position
Australia (ARIA Charts)	54
Belgium Singles Chart (Flanders)	7
Belgium Singles Chart (Wallonia)	15
French Singles Chart	49
