= Sorti de L'enfer =

Single by Infernal

from the album Infernal Affairs
- Released: 1997
- Genre: Trance
- Length: 3:48
- Label: FLEX Club
- Songwriter(s): Infernal, Kristian Paulsen
- Producer(s): Infernal, Kristian Paulsen

Infernal singles chronology
"Sorti de L'enfer" (1997)	"Highland Fling" (1998)

"Sorti de L'enfer" is the debut single by Danish dance-pop duo Infernal (at the time a trio). It was released as the lead single from their debut album, Infernal Affairs, in 1997.

The song originates from live performances at the nightclub Diskotek IN (http://www.discotekin.dk) in Copenhagen. Søren Haahr, then working as a DJ, hired an act called Bordeaux, which consisted of Paw Lagermann, Lina Rafn, Kristian Paulsen and Nicolai Villum Jensen, to perform on stage. They performed what would later be known as "Sorti de L'enfer" at a Scottish-themed event. The song, which featured bagpipes, became so popular that it was eventually released on Kenneth Bager's FLEX Records. Shortly before the release Paulsen and Villum Jensen decided to leave – and instead Søren Haahr joined Paw and Lina – thus giving birth to Infernal, named after the nightclub, Diskotek IN.

== Track listing ==
CD single
No.	Title	Length
1.	"Sorti de L'enfer" (Single Malt Radio Mix)	3:48
2.	"Sorti de L'enfer" (Harmonika Radio Mix)	3:48
3.	"Sorti de L'enfer" (Hacky Sack Mix)	7:17
4.	"Sorti de L'enfer" (Harmonika Mix)	7:17
5.	"Sorti de L'enfer" (Club IN Mix)	7:17

Vinyl single
No.	Title	Length
1.	"Sorti de L'enfer" (Harmonika Mix)	7:45
2.	"Sorti de L'enfer" (Harmonika Mix Instr.)	7:45
3.	"Sorti de L'enfer" (Hacky Snack Mix)	7:45

== Credits and personnel ==
- Written, produced, arranged and mixed by Infernal and Kristian Paulsen
- Lyrics by Paw Lagermann and Lina Rafn

== Charts ==
Chart (1997)	Peak position
Danish Singles Chart	20
