= Can't Go Back =

Can't Go Back may refer to:

- Can't Go Back (album), by Tanita Tikaram, or the title song, 2012
- "Can't Go Back" (Fleetwood Mac song), 1983
- "Can't Go Back" (Primal Scream song), 2008
- Can't Go Back, an album by Papercuts, 2007
- "Can't Go Back", a song by Infernal, 2012
- "Can't Go Back", a song by Joe Satriani from Unstoppable Momentum, 2013
- "Can't Go Back", a song by Sissel Kyrkjebø from Sissel, 2002
- "Can't Go Back" (Steven Universe), a 2018 television episode
