= Electric light (disambiguation) =

Electric light is an artificial light source powered by electricity.

Electric Light may also refer to:

- Light fixture, a decorative enclosure for an electric light source
- Electric Light (album), a 2018 album by James Bay
- Electric Light (poetry), a poetry collection by Irish poet Seamus Heaney, 2001
- "Electric Light" (song), a 2008 song by Infernal
