= Whenever You Need Me =

Whenever You Need Me may refer to:

- "Whenever You Need Me" (Infernal song), 2008
- "Whenever You Need Me" (T'Pau song), 1991
