= Muzaik =

Studio album by Infernal
- Released: 8 October 2001
- Recorded: Infernal Studio, Copenhagen, Denmark
- Genre: Trance, Eurodance, downtempo
- Length: 49:26
- Label: FLEX
- Producer: Kenneth Bager (exec.), Michelle Djarling, Infernal, Ali Movasat, Kristian Paulsen

Infernal chronology
Waiting for Daylight (2001)	Muzaik (2001)	From Paris to Berlin (2004)

Singles from Muzaik
- 1. "You Receive Me" Released: 2001; 2. "Let Me Hear You Say Yeah" Released: 2002

Muzaik is the revised edition of the Danish dance duo Infernals second studio album Waiting for Daylight. The album was a re-release of the Waiting for Daylight album with more pop-oriented versions of the previously released songs and a few new tracks and new artwork. The band has later stated that this is the issue they intended to put out to begin with.

The album contains the hit singles "Serengeti", "Sunrise" and "Muzaik" from the previous album, which all charted within the top 20 of the Danish Singles Chart, except for "Serengeti". Two singles were released from this album: "You Receive Me" and "Let Me Hear You Say Yeah", with the first being the theme song to the second season of the reality television show Big Brother Denmark.

== Track listing ==
No.	Title	Writer(s)	Producer(s)	Length
1.	"Muzaik"	Paw Lagermann, Lina Rafn, Lars Bo Kujahn, Frank Juul	Infernal	5:05
2.	"You Receive Me"	Lagermann, Rafn, Michelle Djarling	Infernal, Michelle Djarling	3:46
3.	"Living Under Water"	Lagermann, Rafn, Moses Malone	Infernal	3:34
4.	"Sunrise"	Tim Christensen, Lagermann, Rafn, De La Ray, Adam Powers	Infernal, Ali Movasat (co.)	3:55
5.	"Let Me Hear You Say Yeah"	Philip Kelsey	Infernal, Kristian Paulsen	4:39
6.	"Adeel"	Lagermann, Rafn, Malone	Infernal	4:33
7.	"Kiss the Sky"	Lagermann, Rafn, Jonas Schrøder	Infernal	3:37
8.	"Humbled by Nature"	Lagermann, Rafn, Powers, Malone	Infernal	3:32
9.	"Serengeti"	Lagermann, Rafn, Ray, Malone	Infernal	3:28
10.	"Sunrise" (acoustic version)	Christensen, Lagermann, Rafn, Ray, Powers	Infernal	3:39
11.	"Mizkett"	Lagermann, Rafn	Infernal	4:08

== Charts ==
Chart (2001)	Peak position
Danish Albums Chart	17
