= Downtown Boys =

Downtown Boys may refer to:

- "Downtown Boys" (song), a song by Danish group Infernal
- Downtown Boys (band), a band from Providence, Rhode Island
