= Keen on Disco =

Single by Infernal

from the album From Paris to Berlin
- Released: June 2005
- Recorded: 2004
- Genre: Dance
- Length: 3:55
- Label: Border Breakers; The Dance Division
- Songwriters: Adam Powers, Lina Rafn, Paw Lagermann
- Producers: Paw Lagermann, Lina Rafn

Infernal singles chronology
| "From Paris to Berlin" (2004) | "Keen on Disco" (2005) | "Cheap Trick Kinda' Girl" (2005) |

"Keen on Disco" is the second single by the Danish dance/house duo Infernal from From Paris to Berlin, their most successful album to date. The single was released in June 2005 in a few selected European countries. It became a hit in Sweden and Finland, entering in the top 15 of both countries. The song became their biggest hit in Sweden, although "From Paris to Berlin" is their best-selling single ever. It managed to peak at number 12 in Finland in June 2005, and at number 13 in Sweden in August 2005.

== Track listings ==
CD single

1. "Keen on Disco" (Radio Edit) — 3:51
2. "Keen on Disco" (Extended Version) — 5:40

CD - Maxi

1. "Keen on Disco" (Radio Edit) — 3:53
2. "Keen on Disco" (Extended Version) — 5:41
3. "Keen on Disco" (Hit 'n' Run 12" Disco Mix) — 5:29
4. "Keen on Disco" (Mouskouri Mix) — 4:04
5. "Keen on Disco" (Inf: Club Mix) — 6:28

Promo CD - Maxi

1. "Keen on Disco" (Radio Edit) — 3:51
2. "Keen on Disco" (Extended Version) — 5:39
3. "Keen on Disco" (Hit 'n' Run 12" Disco Mix) — 5:27
4. "Keen on Disco" (Late Night Mix) — 4:47
5. "Keen on Disco" (Mouskouri Mix) — 4:02
6. "Keen on Disco" (Inf: Club Mix) — 6:27
7. "Keen on Disco" (Monday Morning Trance Mix) — 8:36
8. "Keen on Disco" (Inzider Mix) — 5:35
9. "Keen on Disco" (Rass & Miguel Electro Dub) — 5:34

== Charts ==
| Chart (2005) | Peak |
|---|---|
| Finland (Suomen virallinen lista) | 12 |
| Sweden (Sverigetopplistan) | 13 |

== Cover versions ==
The song was covered by Taiwanese pop singer Jolin Tsai under the title "Bravo Lover" for the 2007 album Agent J.
