= Ten Miles =

Single by Infernal

from the album From Paris to Berlin
- Released: 2006
- Genre: Pop
- Length: 3:30
- Label: Border Breakers
- Songwriters: Paw Lagermann, Lina Rafn, Morgan Jalsing, Nicole Stokholm Pedersen, Moses Malone
- Producer: Infernal

Infernal singles chronology
"A to the B" (2006)	"Ten Miles" (2006)	"Self Control" (2006)
"I Won't Be Crying" (2007)	"Ten Miles" (2007)	"Downtown Boys" (2008)

"Ten Miles" is a song by the Danish pop band Infernal. It was released in 2006 as the second single from the international edition of From Paris to Berlin, and as the sixth single overall. The song became a moderate success in the dance music charts in Denmark, Spain and Finland. In Spain it peaked at #26 and in Denmark at #3 in the Danish Dance Chart. In April 2006, "Ten Miles" debuted in the French Airplay Chart at #84.

In September 2007 at Infernal's official UK website, they stated that their fourth UK single would be "Ten Miles" and the music video was released, receiving as of July 2008 over 1 million views on YouTube. It gradually became an unexpected hit for the duo - passing the peak of their previous single "I Won't Be Crying" in Europe, even though there was no physical release for the song.

The song has been certified Platinum in Denmark.

== Track listing ==
- CD promo single
1. "Ten Miles" (Original Version) — 3:30
2. "Ten Miles" (Weekend Wonderz Remix) — 7:21
- CD single
1. "Ten Miles" (Original Version) — 3:30
2. "Ten Miles" (N-Joy Remix) — 4:18
3. "Ten Miles" (Weekend Wonderz Mix) — 7:21
4. "Ten Miles" (Jack To Life Mix) — 6:28
5. "Ten Miles" (Spank! @ The High Mile Club Mix) — 5:29
- Digital download
1. "Ten Miles" (Original Version) — 3:32
2. "Ten Miles" (Weekend Wonderz Mix) — 7:23
3. "Ten Miles" (Jack To Life Mix) — 6:30
4. "Ten Miles" (Spank! @ The High Mile Club Mix) — 5:29

== Credits and personnel ==
- Written by Paw Lagermann, Lina Rafn, Morgan Jalsing, Nicole Stockholm, Moses Malone
- Produced, arranged and mixed by Infernal at Infernal Studio
- Vocals recorded by Infernal
- Additional vocals by Anne Rani
- Guitar by Jimmy Dee
- "Ten Miles" (N-Joy Remix): remix by Darwich at Studio Panic
- "Ten Miles" (Weekend Wonderz Mix): remix by Daniel Kandi and Fritz Niko for K-Flozz Production
- "Ten Miles" (Jack To Life Mix): remix by Henrik Hjarnø and Søren Lorenzen. Additional engineering and mix by Nils Harbo. Mixed at TechPoint Studio
- "Ten Miles" (Spank! @ The High Mile Club Mix): remix by Paw Lagermann and Jesper Green at Infernal Studio
- A&R by Jesper Green & Michael Guldhammer
- Mastered by Nikolaj Vinten at Medley Mastering & Jan Eliasson at Audio Planet
- Design and artwork by enrico.andreis.dk
- Photography by Steen Trolle
- Management by AHM, Alex Futtrup

== Charts ==
Chart (2007)	Peak position
Denmark (Danish Singles Chart)	3
France (French Singles Chart)	84
Poland (Airplay Chart)	2
Spain (Spanish Singles Chart)	26
