= Banjo Thing =

Single by Infernal featuring Red$tar

from the album From Paris to Berlin
- Released: 2003
- Genre: Eurotrance
- Length: 3:09
- Label: Medley Records
- Songwriters: Lagermann, Rafn, Søren Haahr
- Producer: Infernal

Infernal singles chronology
"The Cult of Noise" (2003)	"Banjo Thing" (2003)	"Cheap Trick Kinda Girl" (2004)

"Banjo Thing" (also known as "Banjo Thing! (Yeepeekayeah Muthafuckas)") is a song by the Danish dance-pop duo Infernal, which features former Infernal member Søren Haahr, as Red$tar, on vocals. It was released in 2003 in Denmark as the first single from their 2004 album From Paris to Berlin. The song samples the 1994 techno song "Swamp Thing" by English group the Grid.

== Track listing ==
No.	Title	Length
1.	"Banjo Thing! (Yeepeekayeah Muthafuckas)" (Radio Mix)	3:09
2.	"Banjo Thing! (Yeepeekayeah Muthafuckas)" (Extended Mix)	6:13

== Credits and personnel ==
- Produced, arranged and mixed by Infernal and Søren Haahr at Infernal Studio
- Written by Infernal and Søren Haahr
- Vocals by Søren Haahr
- Banjo by Roger Dinsdale

== Charts ==
Chart (2003)	Peak position
Danish Singles Chart	3
Hungary (Dance Top 40)	20

== Certifications ==
Certifications for "Banjo Thing"
Region	Certification	Certified units/sales
Denmark (IFPI Danmark)	Gold	45,000^{‡}
^{‡} Sales+streaming figures based on certification alone.
