= From Paris to Berlin =

2004 single by Infernal

- German artwork, also used for most European and Australian releases

Single by Infernal

from the album From Paris to Berlin
- Released: 2004
- Length: 3:27 (radio edit); 5:59 (extended version)
- Label: inf:rec; Border Breakers
- Songwriters: Adam Powers; Paw Lagermann; Lina Rafn
- Producer: Infernal

Infernal singles chronology
"Banjo Thing" (2003)	"From Paris to Berlin" (2004)	"Keen on Disco" (2004)

Infernal singles chronology
"A to the B" (2005)	"From Paris to Berlin" (2006)	"Self Control" (2006)

Alternative covers
- Belgian artwork

Alternative cover
- UK CD2 artwork

Music video
- "From Paris to Berlin" on YouTube

"From Paris to Berlin" is a song by Danish dance-pop group Infernal. It was released in 2004 as the third single from their third studio album, From Paris to Berlin. The song reached number two in both Ireland and the United Kingdom; it was the UK's sixth-biggest-selling single of 2006. In the group's native Denmark, the song was certified quadruple platinum for sales and streaming figures exceeding 360,000 units.

Ahead of the 2006 FIFA World Cup, the song had been re-recorded for fans in England, with lyrics celebrating the England national football team with the title "From London to Berlin". However, the song was withdrawn from radio airplay and TV following England's knockout from the World Cup. In 2007, a video of BBC Radio 1 DJ Colin Murray dancing to this song was published on the Radio 1 website.

== Chart performance ==
"From Paris to Berlin" has been the most popular Infernal single to date and found much of its success when re-released in April 2006. After being used to support the England football squad and a video of well-known disc jockey Colin Murray dancing to the song was broadcast, the song peaked at number two on the UK Singles Chart, coming in at number six on the UK year-end chart for 2006.

== Music video ==
The official music video for the song was heavily inspired by the film Tron.

== Formats and track listings ==
European, Australian, and New Zealand CD single

1. "From Paris to Berlin" (radio version) – 3:27
2. "From Paris to Berlin" (extended version) – 5:59
3. "From Paris to Berlin" (Inf: club mix) – 6:22
4. "From Paris to Berlin" (DJ Aligator meets Mr. President club mix) – 6:36

UK CD1 and French CD single

1. "From Paris to Berlin" (radio version) – 3:29
2. "From Paris to Berlin" (extended version) – 6:03

UK CD2

1. "From Paris to Berlin" (radio edit)
2. "From Paris to Berlin" (original extended remix)
3. "From Paris to Berlin" (Uniting Nations remix)
4. "From Paris to Berlin" (Hoxton Whores remix)
5. "From Paris to Berlin" (video)

French 12-inch single

1. "From Paris to Berlin" (extended version) – 6:03
2. "From Paris to Berlin" (radio version) – 3:29
3. "From Paris to Berlin" (Inf: club mix) – 6:24

German CD single

1. "From Paris to Berlin" (radio version) – 3:29
2. "From Paris to Berlin" (Casino radio mix) – 2:57
3. "From Paris to Berlin" (extended version) – 6:03
4. "From Paris to Berlin" (Inf: club mix) – 6:24
5. "From Paris to Berlin" (DJ Aligator club mix) – 6:37

German mini-CD single

1. "From Paris to Berlin" (radio version) – 3:29
2. "From Paris to Berlin" (Casino radio mix) – 2:57

== Charts ==
=== Weekly charts ===
Chart (2005–2007)	Peak position
Australia (ARIA)	20
Austria (Ö3 Austria Top 40)	49
Belgium (Ultratip Bubbling Under Flanders)	3
Belgium (Ultratop 50 Wallonia)	10
Europe (European Hot 100 Singles)	7
Finland (Suomen virallinen lista)	2
France (SNEP)	14
Germany (GfK)	32
Hungary (Dance Top 40)	2
Ireland (IRMA)	2
Italy (FIMI)	28
Netherlands (Dutch Top 40)	9
Netherlands (Single Top 100)	12
Norway (VG-lista)	6
Scottish Singles Sales (Official Charts)	2
Slovakia Airplay (ČNS IFPI)	98
Spain (Promusicae)	20
Sweden (Sverigetopplistan)	57
Switzerland (Schweizer Hitparade)	61
UK Singles (Official Charts)	2
UK Dance (Official Charts)	15
US Hot Dance Airplay (Billboard)	25

=== Year-end charts ===
Chart (2005)	Position
Belgium (Ultratop 50 Wallonia)	66
France (SNEP)	53

Chart (2006)	Position
Europe (European Hot 100 Singles)	69
Netherlands (Dutch Top 40)	24
Netherlands (Single Top 100)	34
UK Singles (OCC)	6

== Certifications ==
Region	Certification	Certified units/sales
Denmark (IFPI Danmark)	4× Platinum	360,000^{‡}
United Kingdom (BPI)	Platinum	600,000^{‡}
^{‡} Sales+streaming figures based on certification alone.

== Cover versions ==
Shi Xin Hui, a female singer from Singapore, recorded a cover of this song. The cover was called "From Taipei to Beijing" and her debut album was released in the same name in November 2006.
