= Let Me Hear You Say Yeah =

Single by Infernal

from the album Muzaik
- B-side: "Serengeti"
- Released: 2002
- Genre: Trance
- Length: 3:03
- Label: FLEX
- Songwriter(s): Philip Kelsey
- Producer(s): Infernal, Kristian Paulsen

Infernal singles chronology
"You Receive Me" (2001)	"Let Me Hear You Say Yeah" (2002)	"The Cult of Noise" (2003)

Alternative cover

Let Me Hear You Say Yeah is a song by the Danish dance-pop duo Infernal. It was released as the second and final single from the album Muzaik, a revised edition of their second studio album, Waiting for Daylight, in 2002. The song samples PKA's "Let Me Hear You (Say Yeah)", written by Philip Kelsey.

== Track listing ==
No.	Title	Length
1.	"Let Me Hear You Say Yeah" (Radio)	3:03
2.	"Let Me Hear You Say Yeah" (Cannibal Radio)	3:26
3.	"Let Me Hear You Say Yeah" (Extended)	5:28
4.	"Let Me Hear You Say Yeah" (Cannibal Extended)	5:21
5.	"Let Me Hear You Say Yeah" (Spank!@TheMainRoom)	8:30
6.	"Serengeti" (Acid Mix)	9:42

== Credits and personnel ==
- Written by Philip Kelsey
- Produced by Infernal and Kristian Paulsen
- Additional vocals by Nico
- "Let Me Hear You Say Yeah" (Cannibal Radio) and (Cannibal Extended): remix by Hannibal Lector
- "Let Me Hear You Say Yeah" (Spank!@TheMainRoom): remix by Spank!
- "Serengeti": written by Paw Lagermann, Lina Rafn, De La Ray, Moses Malone. Produced by Infernal. Additional vocals by Moses Malone. Acid Mix by Infernal

== Charts ==
Chart (2002)	Peak position
Denmark (Tracklisten)	11
