= Royal Gigolos =

- Also known as: DJ Thoka
- Origin: Krefeld, Germany
- Genres: Electro, techno
- Years active: 2003-present
- Labels: Tigers and Tomatoes Recordings, Ultra, Kontor
- Past members: Michael Schmidt (Mike Moore); Michael Nehrig
- Website: www.royal-gigolos.com

Royal Gigolos were a German tech house group, formed in late 2003 by DJ/producers Michael Schmidt (Mike Moore) and Michael Nehrig (Kosmonova) with vocalists Melanie Stahlkopf and Kristian Romeo, and later in 2008 with Layla and Thorsten Kaiser (DJ Thoka). The group sampled and covered songs from the 1960s and 1980s, several of which were successful across Europe. The group dissolved in 2008.

== Discography ==
=== Studio albums ===
Title	Album details	Peak chart positions
Title	Album details	FRA
Musique Deluxe	Released: 2004; Label: Scorpio Music	193
From California to My Heart	Released: 2007; Label: Central Station	—

=== Singles ===
Year	Title	Peak chart positions										Album
Year	Title	GER	AUS	BEL	DEN	FIN	FRA	IRE	NED	SWI	UK	Album
2004	"California Dreamin'"	85	54	35	17	19	2	27	24	17	44	Musique Deluxe
2004	"No Milk Today"	—	—	48	19	11	15	—	—	60	—	Musique Deluxe
2005	"Self Control"	67	—	—	17	14	—	—	49	90	—	Musique Deluxe
2005	"Somebody's Watching Me"	—	—	—	—	—	—	—	—	—	—	Musique Deluxe
2006	"Tell It to My Heart"	—	—	—	—	—	—	—	—	—	—	From California to My Heart
2008	"Girls Just Wanna Dance"	—	—	—	—	—	—	—	—	—	—	Single only

=== Remixes ===
- 2004: DJ Thoka vs. DJ Taylor - "Happy Song"
- 2004: Dave Armstrong - "Make Your Move"
- 2004: Bomfunk MC's - "No Way in Hell"
- 2005: Laura Branigan - "Self Control 2005"
- 2005: Potatoheadz - "Narcotic"
- 2005: Mike MH-4 - "Electrica Salsa"
- 2005: DJ Tyson vs. Village People - "YMCA 2005"
- 2006: Kelly Llorenna - "Tell It to My Heart"
- 2006: Nimbus - "Ritmo De La Noche"
- 2006: Lazard - "Your Heart Keeps Burning"
- 2007: "Why Did You Do It (The Comfort Zone)" (samples Gigi d'Agostino)
- 2007: Pink - "Get the Party Started"
- 2007: "Girls Just Wanna Dance" (samples Cyndi Lauper's "Girls Just Want to Have Fun", cover of Whitney Houston's "I Wanna Dance with Somebody")
- 2008: Hightower - "Tonight"
- 2008: Urszula Dudziak - "Papaya"
- 2008: Shana Vanguarde - "Gimme! Gimme! Gimme! (A Man After Midnight)" (Royal Gigolos Club Mix)
