= Kosmonova =

German DJ and music producer (born 1970)

- Born: Michael Nehrig; 8 April 1970 (age 55); Krefeld, Germany
- Website: kosmonova.info

Kosmonova (born Michael Nehrig; 8 April 1970 in Krefeld, Germany) is a German DJ and music producer. He was part of the group Royal Gigolos in the 2000s.

== Discography ==
=== Albums ===
Year	Album details
1998	Supernova * Label: Dos or Die Recordings

=== Singles ===
Year	Single	Peak chart positions			
Year	Single	GER	AUT	SWI	NLD
1996	"Raumpatrouille"	37	40	—	—
1997	"Ayla"	24	—	33	—
1997	"Take Me Away"	69	—	—	—
1998	"Celebrate" (vs Fiocco)	33	—	—	23
1998	"Singin' in My Mind" (feat. Tania Evans)	78	—	—	—
1999	"Acid Folk 2000" (pres. Mike Brings)	91	—	—	—
2000	"Danse avec moi!"	16	—	25	83
2000	"Discover the World"	54	—	95	—
2001	"The Daydream" (vs. C-Star)	72	—	—	—
2002	"Sometimes"	—	—	—	—
2004	"My Boy Lollipop"	—	—	—	—

"—" denotes a single that did not chart

=== Remixes ===
Year	Song	Artist	UK
2002	"Forever Young" (Kosmonova remix)	Interactive	37
