= Self Control (Raf song) =

1984 single by Raf, later covered by Laura Branigan

Single by Raf

from the album Raf
- B-side: "Self Control" (Part Two); "Running Away"
- Released: February 1984
- Genre: Italo disco; Eurodisco
- Length: 4:21 (7-inch); 6:08 (12-inch)
- Label: Carrere
- Songwriters: Giancarlo Bigazzi; Raffaele Riefoli; Steve Piccolo
- Producer: Giancarlo Bigazzi

Raf singles chronology
"Self Control" (1984)	"Change Your Mind" (1984)

Music video
- "Self Control" on YouTube

"Self Control" is a song by Italian singer Raf, released in 1984. It was written by Giancarlo Bigazzi, Steve Piccolo and Raf, and arranged by Celso Valli. The track topped the charts in Italy and Switzerland, and started the explosion and dominance of Italo disco-style recordings in continental European charts during the 1980s.

That same year, "Self Control" was covered by American singer Laura Branigan, whose version reached No. 1 in countries such as Austria, Canada, Switzerland and West Germany, as well as No. 4 on the US Billboard Hot 100. Both versions of the song were commercially successful across Europe during much of mid-1984, with Branigan's rendition becoming the most successful single of the year in Switzerland and West Germany.

"Self Control" has become one of the defining songs of the 1980s, with a number of remakes recorded each year. Notable covers include Puerto Rican singer Ricky Martin in 1993, a dance remake by Branigan in 2004, Royal Gigolos in 2005, Danish dance group Infernal in 2006, and German duo Fast Boy in 2024.

== Raf version ==
Raf (born Raffaele Riefoli) co-wrote the song "Self Control" with Giancarlo Bigazzi and Steve Piccolo. His version of "Self Control" reached No. 1 in Italy for seven non-consecutive weeks. It also reached No. 1 in Switzerland, between runs at the top spot by Branigan's version of "Self Control", and peaked at No. 2 in West Germany, No. 7 in Austria and No. 40 in France. Raf released an extended dance mix of the song, like Branigan, but Raf's version featured a rap (performed by two other rap vocalists), relatively rare for a white artist at the time.

He would release several more tracks in English and re-release his 1984 self-titled debut album in 1987 under the title Self Control, featuring two of these tracks. Although his English-language album and especially the singles proved to be successful in Italy and elsewhere, he began releasing his later albums in his native language, almost all of which were received better in Italy than the English-language albums; many of them charted within the top 10 in Italy.

=== Charts ===
==== Weekly charts ====
Weekly chart performance for "Self Control"
Chart (1984)	Peak position
Austria (Ö3 Austria Top 40)	7
Europe (European Top 100 Singles)	4
France (SNEP)	40
Italy (Musica e dischi)	1
Spain (AFYVE)	6
Switzerland (Schweizer Hitparade)	1
West Germany (GfK)	2

==== Year-end charts ====
Year-end chart performance for "Self Control"
Chart (1984)	Position
Switzerland (Schweizer Hitparade)	10
West Germany (Media Control)	15

=== Certifications ===
Certifications for "Self Control"
Region	Certification	Certified units/sales
Italy (FIMI)	Gold	50,000^{‡}
^{‡} Sales+streaming figures based on certification alone.

== Laura Branigan version ==
"Self Control"

Single by Laura Branigan

from the album Self Control
- B-side: "Silent Partners"
- Released: 19 April 1984
- Genre: Italo disco; dance-rock; synth-pop
- Length: 4:06
- Label: Atlantic
- Songwriters: Giancarlo Bigazzi; Raffaele Riefoli; Steve Piccolo
- Producers: Jack White; Robbie Buchanan

Laura Branigan singles chronology
"How Am I Supposed to Live Without You" (1983)	"Self Control" (1984)	"The Lucky One" (1984)

Music video
- "Self Control" on YouTube

American singer Laura Branigan covered "Self Control" in 1984. It was released as the lead single from her third same-titled studio album Self Control, released the same year.

=== History ===
Branigan's first major hit had also been co-written by Bigazzi: "Gloria" (1982) was an English-language cover of the 1979 original Italian song recorded by Umberto Tozzi. The following year, Branigan recorded another English song written over a Tozzi and Bigazzi song, "Mama", which was included on her 1983 album Branigan 2. Branigan chose two more Italian songs for her third album: the first one, "Ti Amo" with lyrics by Diane Warren once again based on the original by Tozzi and Bigazzi that had been a 1977 single for Tozzi. The second one, "Self Control", became the title track to the album and her most successful single internationally. "Self Control" was the only one of the four Italian songs recorded by Branigan that was originally composed in English, and Branigan chose to record the song as written. Also, unlike the other songs, Branigan's version was contemporaneous with that of its co-writer.

Branigan's recording was arranged by Giorgio Moroder's protégé Harold Faltermeyer with Robbie Buchanan and produced by Buchanan with Jack White in West Germany and Los Angeles. A keyboard hook in Raf's version was changed to a guitar riff for Branigan's version and a vocal break was paired with a sharper and repeated percussive element.

=== Composition ===
The song narrates the singer's slip into the world of nightlife, the allure of which has her "livin' only for the night" and deeming herself to "live among the creatures of the night". Rather than actually invoking more self-control, the singer addresses someone: "you take my self, you take my self-control". According to Bryan Buss of AllMusic, the song is about "finding sex in the seamy side of town".

=== Chart performance ===
In the United States, Branigan's cover became her third and last top 10 entry, peaking at No. 4. In Canada, the track reached No. 1 on both the pop and AC charts. Both the Raf original and Branigan's version of "Self Control" entered the German top 20 in May 1984: on 25 June, Branigan's single attained the No. 1 position, where it remained for six weeks, while Raf's version occupied the No. 2 spot.

"Self Control" also topped the charts in Austria, Denmark, Finland, Portugal, South Africa and Sweden, while reaching No. 2 in Norway, No. 3 in Ireland, No. 3 in Australia and No. 5 in the UK.

Raf's version surpassed the success of Branigan's only in his native Italy, where her single reached No. 16. The only other territory where Raf topped the charts was in Switzerland. His single debuted in the Swiss top 30 at No. 7 on 17 June, the same week Branigan's version debuted at No. 24. The following week, Raf's single climbed to No. 2. Branigan's single, however, rose to No. 1. In their third week, Raf's version supplanted Branigan's at number 1, but she regained the top spot in the fourth week and the two versions would remain there, Branigan at No. 1 and Raf at No. 2, for three more weeks.

In their seventh week on the charts, Raf fell to No. 3, below "Wake Me Up Before You Go-Go" by Wham!, while Branigan held at No. 1. Their eighth week on the charts saw Raf regain the No. 2 spot behind Branigan. The following week the Wham! single moved back to No. 2 and Raf fell three spaces, but Branigan held firm. In their tenth week on the charts, Wham! fell to No. 5, Raf fell two more spots, and Branigan maintained pole position.

Finally, on the week of 26 August, "Such a Shame" by Talk Talk moved Branigan out of the number-one spot, though she would remain in the top five for another three weeks. Branigan's record spent a total of 16 weeks in the Swiss top 30, including 12 weeks in the top five and eight weeks at No. 1. Branigan's version eventually became the most successful single of 1984 in both Switzerland and West Germany.

=== Music video ===
Branigan was one of the first artists of the video era to work with an Academy Award-winning film director on a music video when William Friedkin (The French Connection, The Exorcist) directed the clip. Filmed in New Jersey and New York City, the video was produced by Fred Caruso and first aired in April 1984.

The video drew controversy, and MTV requested some edits before it could air. Entertainment Tonight aired a segment on the network's reaction to the clip, which was being played in late-night slots on other networks. Though Branigan resisted at first, her record company convinced her to allow a minor alteration and the video was aired on MTV, though by this time the single had peaked on the charts. Branigan would go on to be nominated for a 1985 American Music Award for Favorite Pop/Rock Female Video Artist, losing to Cyndi Lauper.

=== Live performances ===
Branigan performed the song live in her debut on The Tonight Show Starring Johnny Carson on 27 April 1984. She also promoted the song during appearances on The Merv Griffin Show, Solid Gold (12 May 1984), Dick Clark's American Bandstand (9 June 1984) and the syndicated Dick Clark television special Rock Rolls On, which she also co-hosted.

=== Media usage ===
In August 2025, "Self Control" was used as the soundtrack to a Virgin Media O2 television commercial. With an increase in attention, the song peaked at number 29 on the UK Singles Downloads Chart on 12 September 2025.

The song also featured in the video game Grand Theft Auto: Vice City, released in 2002. The song was part of the fictional 80s synth-pop radio station Flash FM.

=== Track listings ===
- 7-inch single
1. "Self Control" – 4:06
2. "Silent Partners" – 3:55
- 12-inch maxi single
1. "Self Control" (extended version) – 5:04
2. "Silent Partners" (extended version) – 4:10

=== Charts ===
==== Weekly charts ====
1984 weekly chart performance for "Self Control"
Chart (1984)	Peak position
Argentina (CAPIF)	1
Australia (Kent Music Report)	3
Austria (Ö3 Austria Top 40)	1
Belgium (Ultratop 50 Flanders)	3
Canada Top Singles (RPM)	1
Canada Adult Contemporary (RPM)	1
Canada Retail Singles (The Record)	1
Denmark (IFPI)	1
Europe (European Top 100 Singles)	1
European Hit Radio (Music & Media)	2
Finland (Suomen virallinen lista)	1
France (SNEP)	13
Ireland (IRMA)	2
Israel (Israeli Singles Chart)	1
Italy (Musica e dischi)	16
Luxembourg (Radio Luxembourg)	4
Netherlands (Dutch Top 40)	7
Netherlands (Single Top 100)	10
New Zealand (Recorded Music NZ)	26
Norway (VG-lista)	2
Paraguay (UPI)	7
Peru (UPI)	2
Portugal (AFP)	1
Puerto Rico (UPI)	5
Quebec (ADISQ)	1
South Africa (Springbok Radio)	1
Spain (AFYVE)	24
Sweden (Sverigetopplistan)	1
Switzerland (Schweizer Hitparade)	1
UK Singles (Official Charts)	5
Uruguay (UPI)	1
US Billboard Hot 100	4
US Adult Contemporary (Billboard)	5
US Dance Club Songs (Billboard)	2
US Cash Box Top 100 Singles	5
West Germany (GfK)	1

2023–2025 weekly chart performance for "Self Control"
Chart (2023–2025)	Peak position
Lithuania Airplay (TopHit)	4
Poland (Polish Airplay Top 100)	57
UK Singles Downloads Chart (OCC)	29

==== Monthly charts ====
2024 monthly chart performance for "Self Control"
Chart (2024)	Position
Lithuania Airplay (TopHit)	16

==== Year-end charts ====
Year-end chart performance for "Self Control"
Chart (1984)	Position
Australia (Kent Music Report)	41
Austria (Ö3 Austria Top 40)	5
Belgium (Ultratop 50 Flanders)	16
Canada Top Singles (RPM)	15
France (SNEP)	13
Netherlands (Dutch Top 40)	54
Netherlands (Single Top 100)	92
South Africa (Springbok Radio)	5
Switzerland (Schweizer Hitparade)	1
UK Singles (Gallup)	30
US Billboard Hot 100	20
US Adult Contemporary (Billboard)	34
US Dance Club Songs (Billboard)	31
US Cash Box Top 100 Singles	51
West Germany (Media Control)	1

=== Certifications ===
Certifications for "Self Control"
Region	Certification	Certified units/sales
Denmark (IFPI Danmark)	Gold	45,000^{‡}
France (SNEP)	Gold	500,000^{*}
Germany (BVMI)	Gold	500,000^{^}
New Zealand (RMNZ)	Gold	15,000^{‡}
Spain (Promusicae)	Gold	30,000^{‡}
United Kingdom (BPI) Physical sales in 1984	Silver	250,000^{^}
United Kingdom (BPI) Sales + streams since 2004	Gold	400,000^{‡}
^{*} Sales figures based on certification alone.^{^} Shipments figures based on certification alone.^{‡} Sales+streaming figures based on certification alone.

=== Re-releases ===
"Self Control 2004"

Single by Laura Branigan
- Released: 2004
- Length: 3:21
- Label: Dance Street
- Songwriters: Giancarlo Bigazzi; Raffaele Riefoli; Steve Piccolo

Laura Branigan singles chronology
"I Believe" (1995)	"Self Control 2004" (2004)	"Gloria 2004" (2004)

Branigan's "Self Control" was paired with follow-up single "The Lucky One" for an "oldies series" release in the US. In the UK, a similar release paired the song with her earlier single, "Gloria". In 1992, the original single mix of "Self Control" was re-released on CD single and 12-inch vinyl by Atlantic/WEA in Germany featuring two new remixes. One of those, the Classic Summer Mix, appeared on the European greatest hits album The Very Best of Laura Branigan. In 1999, four new remixes of "Self Control" were commissioned for a South African collection called Back in Control, on Atlantic/Gallo. "Self Control '99" was released as a CD single there. In the mid-2000s, several trance music remixes featuring samples of various lengths from the 1984 Branigan original surfaced from various entities including Crooklyn Clan, Imperial Machine, and SK featuring Branigan. None of these mixes were done with Branigan's participation.

As of 2010, the Self Control album remains in print and the original version can also be heard on The Best of Branigan (1993), and in remastered versions on The Essentials: Laura Branigan (2002) and The Platinum Collection (2006).

==== 2004 version ====
Branigan sought to reclaim her career after years away from the music industry first to take care of her ailing husband and then to mourn his loss. She re-recorded her two biggest club hits for the 20th anniversary of "Self Control" and they were released in a slew of remixes as "Gloria 2004" and "Self Control 2004". The latter track reached the top 10 on the Billboard Hot Dance Singles Sales chart following Branigan's sudden death from an aneurysm in August of that year.

===== Track listings =====
- CD maxi single
1. "Self Control 2004" (Mindworkers Radio Mix) – 3:21
2. "Self Control 2004" (Flip & Fill Remix) – 6:45
3. "Self Control 2004" (Mindworkers Remix) – 7:07
4. "Self Control 2004" (Force Four Remix) – 7:45
5. "Self Control 2004" (Kenny Hayes Club Mix) – 6:07
6. "Self Control 2004" (Mindworkers Instrumental) – 7:05

==== Charts ====
Weekly chart performance for "Self Control 2004"
Chart (2004)	Peak position
US Dance Singles Sales (Billboard)	10

== Ricky Martin version ==
"Que Día Es Hoy"

Single by Ricky Martin

from the album Me Amaras
- B-side: "Que Día Es Hoy" (Remix)
- Released: 14 June 1993
- Recorded: 1992–1993
- Studio: Ocean Way Recording Studios (Los Angeles, US)
- Genre: Latin pop
- Length: 4:25
- Label: CBS International; Sony Music Mexico
- Songwriters: Giancarlo Bigazzi; Steve Piccolo; Raffaele Riefoli; Juan Carlos Calderón; Mikel Herzog
- Producers: Juan Carlos Calderón; Mikel Herzog

Ricky Martin singles chronology
"Me Amaras" (1993)	"Que Día Es Hoy" (1993)	"Entre el Amor y los Halagos" (1993)

Audio
- "Self Control" (audio) on YouTube

In 1993, Ricky Martin recorded a Spanish-language cover of "Self Control", titled "Que Dia Es Hoy" ("What Day Is It Today?"). With lyrics by producer Juan Carlos Calderón and Mikel Herzog, the song was released as single from Martin's second studio solo album, Me Amaras, in 1993. The single featured a remixed version of the track. A music video was also released. In 2008, the remixed version was included on CD and DVD, called 17.

=== Track listings ===
- Latin America promotional 12-inch single
1. "Que Dia Es Hoy (Self Control)" (Remix Extended Version) – 8:01
2. "Que Dia Es Hoy (Self Control)" (Remix Radio Version) – 4:52
3. "Que Dia Es Hoy (Self Control)" (Remix Extended Dub Version) – 6:03
4. "Que Dia Es Hoy (Self Control)" – 4:22
- Brazilian promotional CD single
1. "Que Dia Es Hoy (Self Control)" (Club Mix) – 8:01
2. "Que Dia Es Hoy (Self Control)" (Club Mix Edit) – 4:52
3. "Que Dia Es Hoy (Self Control)" (Dub Mix) – 6:03
4. "Te Quero Amor (Que Dia Es Hoy)" – 4:22

=== Charts ===
Weekly chart performance for "Que Dia Es Hoy"
Chart (1993)	Peak position
US Hot Latin Songs (Billboard)	26

== Royal Gigolos version ==
"Self Control" / "Somebody's Watching Me"

Single by Royal Gigolos

from the album Musique Deluxe
- Released: 2005
- Length: 4:11
- Label: Epic; Clubland
- Songwriters: Giancarlo Bigazzi; Raffaele Riefoli; Steve Piccolo
- Producer: Royal Gigolos

Royal Gigolos singles chronology
"No Milk Today" (2004)	"Self Control" / "Somebody's Watching Me" (2005)	"Tell It to My Heart" (2006)

Music video
- "Self Control" on YouTube

In 2004, German dance group Royal Gigolos recorded a cover of "Self Control" for their debut studio album, Musique Deluxe. It was released as a CD maxi single the following year, along with their cover of the 1984 Rockwell song "Somebody's Watching Me". Their version reached the top 20 in Denmark and Finland.

=== Track listings ===
- CD maxi single
1. "Self Control" (D.O.N.S. single mix) – 3:42
2. "Self Control" (single version) – 3:46
3. "Self Control" (extended version) – 5:05
4. "Self Control" (D.O.N.S. remix) – 6:18
5. "Self Control" (Swen G° remix) – 6:32
6. "Somebody's Watching Me" (single version) – 3:17
7. "Somebody's Watching Me" (extended version) – 4:27
8. "Somebody's Watching Me" (DJ Tyson club mix) – 6:36
9. "Self Control" (video)

=== Charts ===
Weekly chart performance for "Self Control"
Chart (2005–2006)	Peak position
Austria (Ö3 Austria Top 40)	42
Denmark (Tracklisten)	17
Finland (Suomen virallinen lista)	14
Germany (GfK)	67
Netherlands (Single Top 100)	49
Switzerland (Schweizer Hitparade)	90

== Infernal version ==
"Self Control"

Single by Infernal

from the album From Paris to Berlin
- Released: 2006
- Length: 3:40 (radio edit); 3:16 (UK radio edit)
- Label: Border Breakers; Inf:Rec
- Songwriters: Giancarlo Bigazzi; Raffaele Riefoli; Steve Piccolo
- Producer: Infernal

Infernal singles chronology
"Ten Miles" (2006)	"Self Control" (2006)	"I Won't Be Crying" (2007)

Music video
- "Self Control" on YouTube

In 2006, Danish dance group Infernal released a cover of the song on 6 November in the UK. The song debuted in the chart at No. 61 based on downloads only. The track was also released in Australia, as a double A-side with "I Won't Be Crying", though it did not chart there. Their recording reached the top 10 in Finland and their native Denmark.

=== Track listings ===
- CD single
1. "Self Control" (Radio Edit) – 3:40
2. "From Paris to Berlin" (DJ Aligator Remix) – 6:37
- 12-inch single
1. "Self Control" (Soul Seekerz Remix) – 7:41
2. "Self Control" (Extended Version) – 6:00
3. "Self Control" (Robbie Rivera Juicy Mix) – 6:14

=== Charts ===
Weekly chart performance for "Self Control"
Chart (2006)	Peak position
Denmark (Tracklisten)	3
Finland (Suomen virallinen lista)	6
Hungary (Editors' Choice Top 40)	34
Ireland (IRMA)	14
UK Singles (Official Charts)	18

== Kendra Erika version ==
In 2018, American singer Kendra Erika released a cover of "Self Control", reaching number one on Billboard's Dance Club Songs chart.

=== Track listings ===
- The Remixes
1. "Self Control" (Dirty Werk Radio Mix) – 3:14
2. "Self Control" (Moto Blanco Radio Edit) – 3:06
3. "Self Control" (Ralphi Rosario & Erick Ibiza Radio Mix) – 3:56

=== Charts ===
Weekly chart performance for "Self Control"
Chart (2019)	Peak position
US Dance Club Songs (Billboard)	1

== Other versions ==
In 2023 Dutch DJs Eelke Kleijn and Lee Cabrera released a cover of "Self Control", based less on Raf's version and more on Laura Branigan's cover.

In 2024 German duo Fast Boy remade the track for its 40th anniversary, and renamed it "Wave".

== See also ==
- List of European number-one hits of 1984
- List of number-one singles of 1984 (Canada)
- List of number-one hits of 1984 (Germany)
- List of number-one hits of 1984 (Italy)
- List of number-one singles of the 1 980s (Switzerland)
- List of number-one dance singles of 2019 (U.S.)
- List of number-one singles and albums in Sweden
