= Vig Festival =

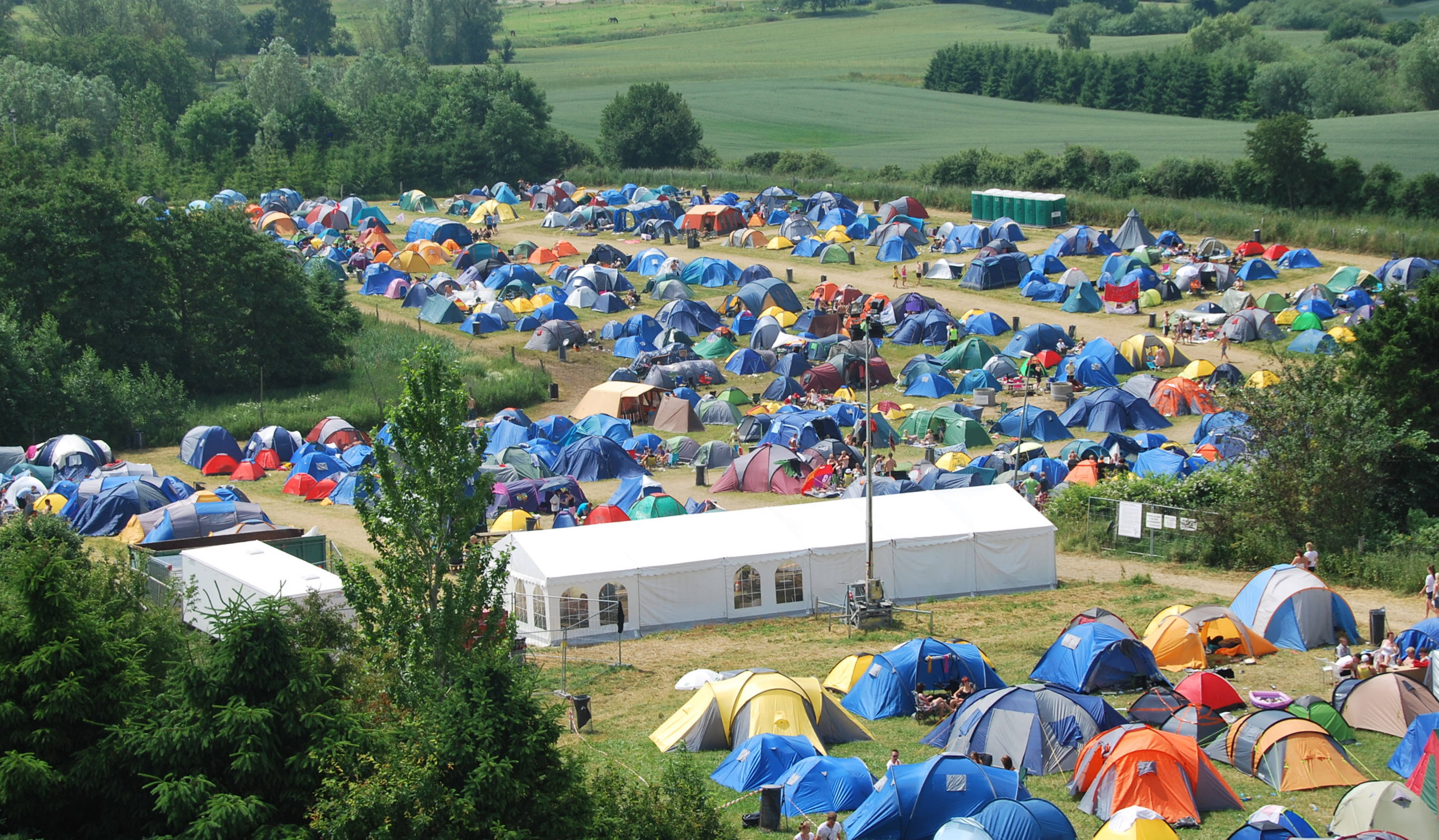
Camping Area at Vig Festival 2010. (Photo: Lars Schmidt)

Vig Festival is an annual Danish music festival.

== History ==
Vig festival has been held in Vig since 1995. As of 2007 it has 4 stages, and the headliners of 2007 was Runrig, and Danish acts including Infernal and Thomas Helmig.
