= Speedtrap (band) =

Finnish heavy metal band

Speedtrap was a Finnish speed and heavy metal band from Lappeenranta. The band issued two albums on Svart Records.

== Discography ==
- Raw Deal EP (2009)
- Split album with Death with a Dagger (2010)
- Powerdose (2013)
- Straight Shooter (2015)
