= I Won't Be Crying =

Single by Infernal

from the album From Paris to Berlin (UK)
- Released: May 21, 2007
- Recorded: 2007
- Genre: Dance-pop, electropop
- Length: 3:02 (radio edit)
- Label: Island
- Songwriters: Lagermann, Rafn, Powers, Martin Gore

Infernal singles chronology
"Self Control" (2006)	"I Won't Be Crying" (2007)	"Ten Miles" (2007)

Alternative cover

"I Won't Be Crying" is the Danish dance band Infernal's 3rd single released in the UK. "I Won't Be Crying" peaked #1 at the TV-channel The Voice TV Danmark. The music video was directed by Loic Maes and shot in Paris. This is their most viewed video on YouTube, 3 million views As of October 2010.

The song heavily samples "Strangelove", a 1987 song by the English band Depeche Mode.

The UK release date was set to be 21 May 2007. According to the band's website it would have guaranteed them a UK tour, if this single reached #1. The CD single release was cancelled in the UK, due to an apparent lack of media support. However, it did reach #123 in the singles chart due to digital download sales.

== Release details ==
Country	Format	Date
United Kingdom	Download	May 7, 2007
United Kingdom	CD	May 21, 2007
Belgium	12"	May 21, 2007
Netherlands	CD/Download	June 4, 2007
Australia	CD	July 14, 2007

== Track listings and formats ==
UK CD single

1. "I Won't Be Crying" [radio edit] – 3:02
2. "I Won't Be Crying" [Beatfreakz club mix] – 6:39

UK Enhanced Maxi single

1. "I Won't Be Crying" [radio edit] – 3:02
2. "I Won't Be Crying" [extended version] – 5:34
3. "I Won't Be Crying" [Beatfreakz club mix] – 6:39
4. "I Won't Be Crying" [Matt Bradshaw extended mix] – 7:09
5. "I Won't Be Crying" [Sleaze Sisters mix] – 7:21
6. "I Won't Be Crying" [Inf: Skru Op! mix] – 7:06
7. "I Won't Be Crying" [video]

Belgian 12" single

Side 1

1. "I Won't Be Crying" [Extended version] – 5:35
2. "I Won't Be Crying" [Beatfreakz club mix] – 7:12

Side

1. "I Won't Be Crying" [Basto re-dub] – 6:00

Dutch CD/download single

1. "I Won't Be Crying" [album version] – 3:27
2. "I Won't Be Crying" [Basto radio dub] – 3:00
3. "I Won't Be Crying" [extended version] – 5:35
4. "I Won't Be Crying" [Beatfreakz club mix] – 7:12
5. "I Won't Be Crying" [Basto re-dub] – 6:00

Australian Maxi single
In Australia, "I Won't Be Crying" was released as a AA side single with "Self Control".

1. "I Won't Be Crying" [radio edit]
2. "Self Control" [original version]
3. "I Won't Be Crying" [extended version]
4. "I Won't Be Crying" [Beatfreakz club mix]
5. "I Won't Be Crying" [Matt Bradshaw extended mix]
6. "Self Control" [Soul Seekerz Remix]
7. "Self Control" [Robbie Rivera Juicy Mix]
8. "I Won't Be Crying" [Weekend Wonderz Club Mix]

=== Other remixes/versions ===
- "I Won't Be Crying" [Beatfreakz dub mix] – 7:10
- "I Won't Be Crying" [Gang Bang DJ's Funky remix] – 4:52

== Charts ==
=== Weekly charts ===
Chart (2007)	Peak position
Belgium (Ultratip Bubbling Under Flanders)	8
Belgian Ultratop 30 Dance Chart	12
CIS Airplay (TopHit)	38
Denmark Airplay Chart	15
Denmark Singles Chart	2
Denmark Download Chart	2
Finland (Suomen virallinen lista)	16
Hungary (Editors' Choice Top 40)	15
Hungary (Single Top 40)	10
Netherlands (Single Top 100)	99
Poland (Polish Airplay Charts)	4

=== Year-end charts ===
Chart (2007)	Position
CIS (Tophit)	199
