= Border Breakers =

Border Breakers is a Danish record company. Acts currently signed to the record label are:

- Infernal
- Anna David
- Bryan Rice
- Hampenberg
- Speedtrap
