= Infernal (Danish band) =

Danish dance-pop group

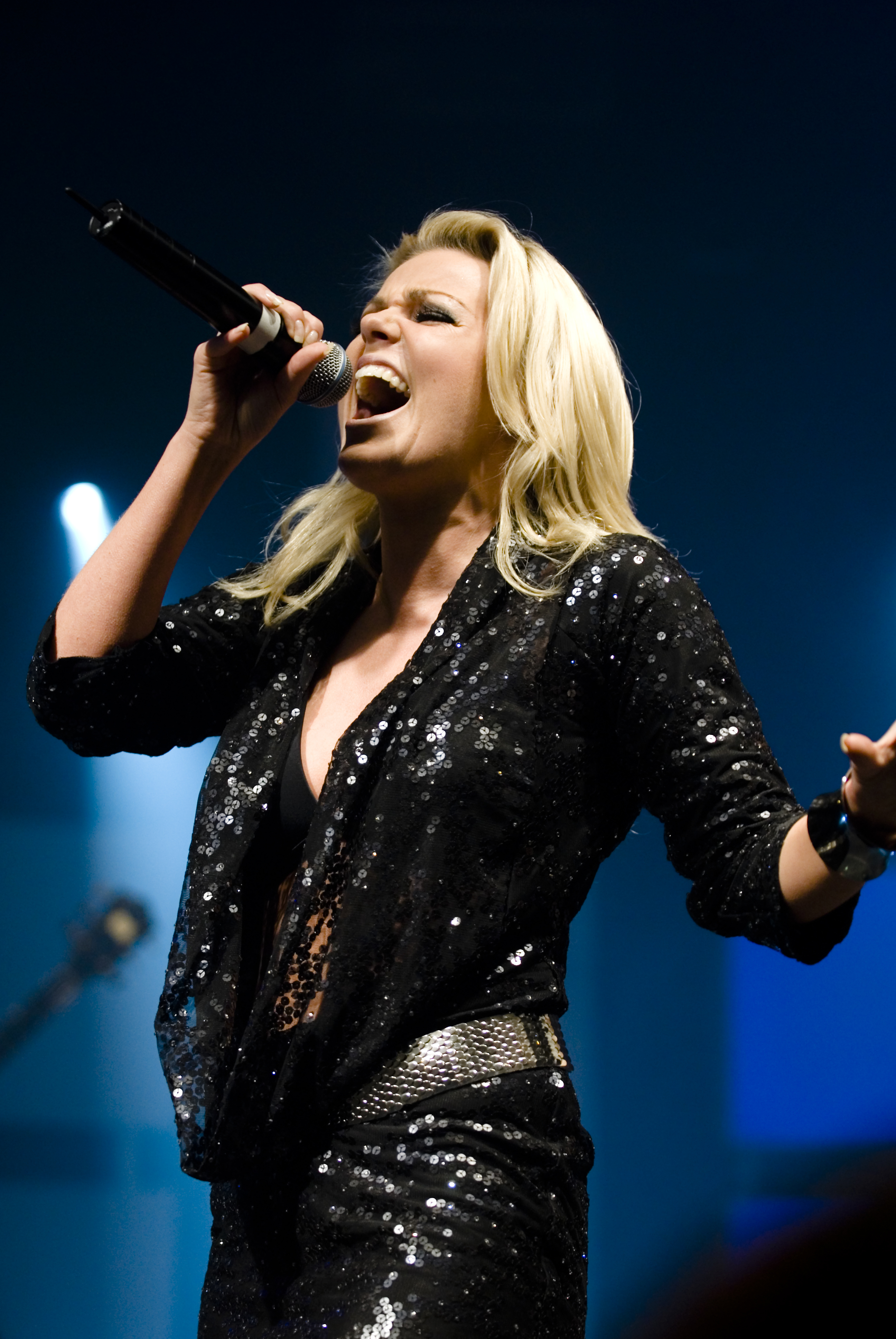
- Lead singer Lina Rafn at the 2007 Danish DJ Awards

Background information
- Origin: Copenhagen, Denmark
- Genres: Electro house, dance-pop, nu-disco, electropop (2004–present); Eurodance, trance (1997–2003)
- Years active: 1997–present
- Labels: FLEX Records (1997–2003); Border Breakers (2004–present)
- Members: Lina Rafn; Paw Lagermann
- Past members: Søren Haahr
- Website: infernal.dk

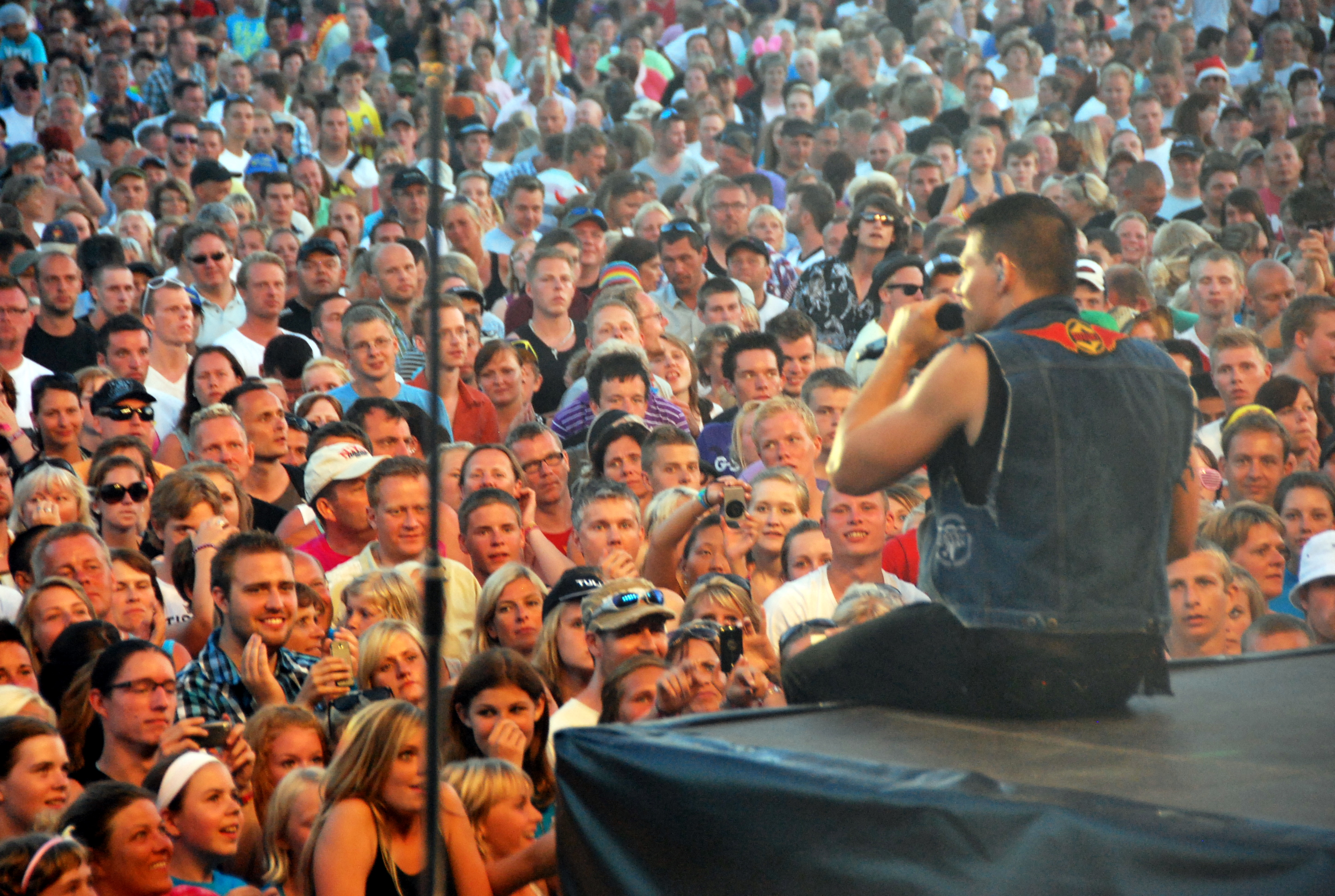
Paw Lagermann during Infernal-concert at Vig Festival 2010. (Photo: Lars Schmidt)

Infernal (occasionally stylized with metal umlaut as Infërnal) is a dance-pop group from Denmark, consisting of members Lina Rafn and Paw Lagermann. They made their Danish debut in 1997 with the release of the track "Sorti de L'enfer", and went on to international chart success in the 2000s. Their most successful single to date has been "From Paris to Berlin", which charted well in many European countries throughout 2006 and 2007. In addition to the original single, an alternate version was released in the UK titled "From London to Berlin", supporting England in the 2006 FIFA World Cup.

Infernal have released six studio albums, with the 1998 debut album Infernal Affairs reaching double platinum sales in Denmark. Their mainstream breakthrough came with From Paris to Berlin from 2004, and the success continued with Electric Cabaret in 2008, certified with double platinum and platinum, respectively.

Paw Lagermann and Lina Rafn have made a comeback in 2012 as a duo called Paw&Lina with the hit single "Stolt af mig selv?"

== History ==
=== 1997–2003: Musical beginnings and early success ===
Infernal started out as a three-piece band in 1997 with Lina, Paw, and Søren Haahr, but Søren left the group in 2000. Initially they were known for their unconventional style of singing as well as their experimental blend of different genres of music. In recent years they have turned towards more songwriting and their sound have gone from a subgenre club-sound to dance-oriented pop-sound aimed at the charts. An example of their early musical experiments is their track "Kalinka" which is based on the Russian Drobushki folk melody. From 1998 to 2004, the band released four albums in their native Denmark, three studio albums, one of them being a re-issue and one remix/live compilation album. All of them spawned Top 10 hits in Denmark, for example "Sunrise", "Muzaik", "Kiss The Sky", "Kalinka" and "You Receive Me", the latter being the theme song for a Danish season of the TV show Big Brother.

=== 2004–2007: International breakthrough ===
In 2004, their third studio album From Paris to Berlin was released. With the release of the title track, "From Paris to Berlin", they went on to major international chart-success. "From Paris to Berlin" became the only song released by a Danish act nominated at the Nordic Music Awards 2005. Ahead of the World Cup 2006, "From Paris to Berlin" was re-recorded for the English market with lyrics celebrating the English football squad, titled "From London to Berlin". However, the song was withdrawn from radio airplay and TV following England's knockout from the World Cup. In July 2006, "From Paris to Berlin" climbed to number 2 on the UK Singles Chart and remained in the top five for seven weeks, becoming the 6th best selling single in the UK in 2006.

The following single released in the UK was "Self Control". It was a cover of a 1984 song by Italian pop singer Raf, which was also covered by Laura Branigan that same year. The Infernal version stalled at number 18 on the UK charts, and number 14 in Ireland. The single was not released in Spain, due to a similar version being released by Spanish singer Soraya Arnelas. Instead, they released "Ten Miles" in Spain, which topped the Spanish singles charts in November 2006. "I Won't Be Crying" served as the third single in Europe but failed to build momentum and gain significant airplay in the UK. It still went on to become a moderate hit in Europe and became the band's most watched video on YouTube, passing 9,000,000 views.

On 28 May 2007, the band released a new version of their From Paris to Berlin album, this time in Europe and Asia. The new album contained two new songs and a bonus DVD on the Japanese edition. Counting sales of both first and second versions, From Paris to Berlin has sold more than one million copies worldwide.
Afterwards, "Ten Miles", was released in Europe. The song became an unexpected hit for the duo, surpassing the peak of "I Won't Be Crying" in Europe and reaching Top 5 in Poland.

=== 2008–2016: Electric Cabaret and Fall from Grace ===
"We are experimenting with the sound and the direction of the album. The only thing we know is that we want it to be a little less feathers&sequins and a bit more jeans&T-shirt’ish. I don’t know how that sounds. We only know what feeling we are trying to create."

— Lina Rafn on the creation of the 2010 album.

The band announced in February 2008 that their next album, Electric Cabaret, would be released worldwide on 11 August 2008. The lead single, "Downtown Boys", was premiered at Boogie Prisen, a Danish award show on national TV. The single was released on 14 April 2008 and peaked at number two on the Danish Singles Chart, surpassing the peaks of "Self Control" and "I Won't Be Crying", and number one for four weeks on the Danish Airplay Chart, being their first single to top the chart. On 13 June 2008, the full track list and album cover were released. The album met positive reviews, stating that stand-out tracks from the album include "Punk Disco" and "Redefinition". Electric Cabaret was Infernal's first album to be released digitally through the band's official website, allowing fans from countries where the band is not signed to buy their music legally.

On 26 June 2009 Lina Rafn announced that Infernal had started working on material for their fifth studio album, which was at that time scheduled to be released "sometime in 2010". The overall sound of the album was described as "less feathers&sequins and a bit more jeans&T-shirt'ish." In November 2009, Paw Lagermann said that they had written three songs with Thomas Troelsen, who had previously co-written "Dead or Alive" from Electric Cabaret, including one outtake from the previous album, which had been reworked. He also revealed that they recorded 16-18 potential songs for the album, some of which would remain instrumental tracks. On 4 April 2010, Lagermann revealed that the album Fall from Grace would be released in late September 2010. He also said that the lead single off the album, "Love Is All...", would be released in early May 2010. On 10 July 2010, the entire Fall from Grace track list was posted by Infernal themselves on their official website.

On 15 September 2010, Infernal released the second single from Fall from Grace, "Alone, Together". The single was released in Scandinavian iTunes Stores and their own Music Store that utilizes the music downloading service Klicktrack. In the first two weeks after its release, Fall from Grace sold only 1,850 copies in Denmark.

On 27 April 2012 Infernal released a different version of "Love Is All..." for the UK audience.

On 10 November 2012 Infernal released the single "Can't Go Back". After its release, Infernal denied it was from an album and announced that Fall from Grace would in fact be their last full album, as the process of creating album became stressful for Rafn, who with Lagermann, create the music as well as write the lyrics for the songs. The band stated that they would focus on releasing songs and touring more.

On 4 January 2013 the record label EMI released a compilation album titled De første fra Infernal, which translates as The first from Infernal.

On 9 September Infernal released the live EP Put Your Fucking Hands Up.

=== 2017–2022: Singles ===
In early 2017 Infernal released the promotional single "Hurricane", which was intended to be from a forthcoming album that did not materialise. The official remix reached number two on the Danish Dance Chart in February 2017 and spent 14 weeks in the Dance Chart top 10.

Two more promotional singles followed in May 2017—"Weightless" and "Holding On".

In December 2017 Infernal released the single "Not Alone (Alo Elo Ele)" through streaming platforms. The song reached number nine on the Danish dance chart in February 2018.

The band released the single "Fist Up" on 16 March 2018, followed by "Made You Love Me" on 18 May 2018, "Don't U Know That I Care" on 12 October 2018, and "WeToo" on 21 December 2018. The band also toured in late 2018.

On 12 July 2019 Infernal released the single, "1000 Colours", a track they wrote for the 25th anniversary of Danish brand REMA 1000. After a positive response to it they decided to release it as a single.

On 15 November 2019 Infernal released the single "Techno Tombola" in promotion of their tour they were on at the time.

On 8 May 2020 Infernal released the single "We Luv", announcing that the song is the official Vi Elsker anthem.

On 7 May 2021 Infernal released the single "Inner Fire".

=== 2017 – present: 25 years of Infernal & HORMESIS & INF:ALBUM ===
On 16 November Infernal posted a countdown clock for a special announcement celebrating 25 years of Infernal's musical career; they also announced their new album. On 17 November Infernal released their new album, titled HORMESIS.

Infernal have also announce their 7th album is in the works.

On 23 October infernal teased a track from ‘I7’.

On 2 November Infernal announced that their new album would be titled 'INF:ALBUM'

the album was put up ontheir website to pre-order the album on vinyl. the album is scheduled for release on 20 December.

== Discography ==
- Infernal Affairs (1998)
- Waiting for Daylight^{[A]} (2000)
- From Paris to Berlin^{[B]} (2004)
- Electric Cabaret (2008)
- Fall from Grace (2010)
- HORMESIS (2022)
- INF:ALBUM (2024)

Notes

A Waiting for Daylight was re-released in 2001 as Muzaik with re-recorded versions and previously unreleased songs.
B From Paris to Berlin was re-released in an international, UK, US and Taiwan editions from 2005 to 2007.

== Awards ==
Year	Award	Category	Nominated work	Result
2002	Danish DeeJay Award	Danish Club Hit of the Year	"Muzaik"	Nominated
2002	Danish DeeJay Award	Danish Artist of the Year		Won
2002	Danish DeeJay Award	Danish Performer of the Year		Won
2002	Danish DeeJay Award	Danish Album of the Year	Muzaik	Nominated
2005	Danish DeeJay Award	Danish Artist of the Year		Won
2005	Danish DeeJay Award	Danish Album of the Year	From Paris to Berlin	Nominated
2005	Danish DeeJay Award	Danish DeeJay Favourite of the Year	"From Paris to Berlin"	Won
2005	Danish DeeJay Award	Danish Club Hit of the Year (The Dancechart.dk Award)	"From Paris to Berlin"	Nominated
2006	Danish DeeJay Award	Danish Artist of the Year		Nominated
2006	Danish DeeJay Award	Danish DeeJay Favourite of the Year	"Keen on Disco"	Nominated
2006	Danish DeeJay Award	Danish Club Hit of the Year (The Dancechart.dk Award)	"Keen on Disco"	Won
2007	Danish DeeJay Award	Danish Artist of the Year		Nominated
2007	Danish DeeJay Award	Danish Club Hit of the Year (The Dancechart.dk Award)	"Ten Miles"	Nominated
2008	Danish DeeJay Award	The Voice Award	"I Won't Be Crying"	Nominated
2008	Danish DeeJay Award	Danish Club Hit of the Year (The Dancechart.dk Award)	"I Won't Be Crying"	Nominated
2009	Danish DeeJay Award	The Voice Award	"Downtown Boys"	Nominated
2009	Danish DeeJay Award	Danish Club Hit of the Year (The Dancechart.dk Award)	"Downtown Boys"	Nominated
2009	Danish DeeJay Award	Danish Album of the Year	Electric Cabaret	Nominated
1999	Danish Grammy Award	Danish Upfront Dance Release of the Year	Infernal Affairs	Won
2002	Danish Music Award	Danish Club Hit of the Year	"Muzaik"	Won
2008	MTV Europe Music Award	Best Danish Act		Nominated
2006	P3 Guld	P3 Lytterhittet (Listener's Award)	"Ten Miles"	Nominated
2006	P3 Guld	P3 Respekten (Respect Award)		Nominated
2009	MTV Europe Music Award	Best Danish Act		Nominated
2010	The Voice Awards	The Best Of Year		Won

== Paw&Lina ==
Paw Lagermann and Lina Rafn of Infernal have also made recordings as a duo under the name Paw&Lina. A version of the Infernal album Electric Cabaret with a commentary track stretching over the entire album done in Danish was released crediting Paw & Lina and was also made available for download

The duo Paw&Lina also had a comeback in 2012 with the hit single "Stolt af mig selv?" that reached number eight on the Danish Singles Chart.

Discography

Year	Single	Peak position
Year	Single	DEN
2012	"Stolt af mig selv?"	8
2014	"Forfra"	30
