= Lina Rafn =

Danish singer and songwriter (born 1976)

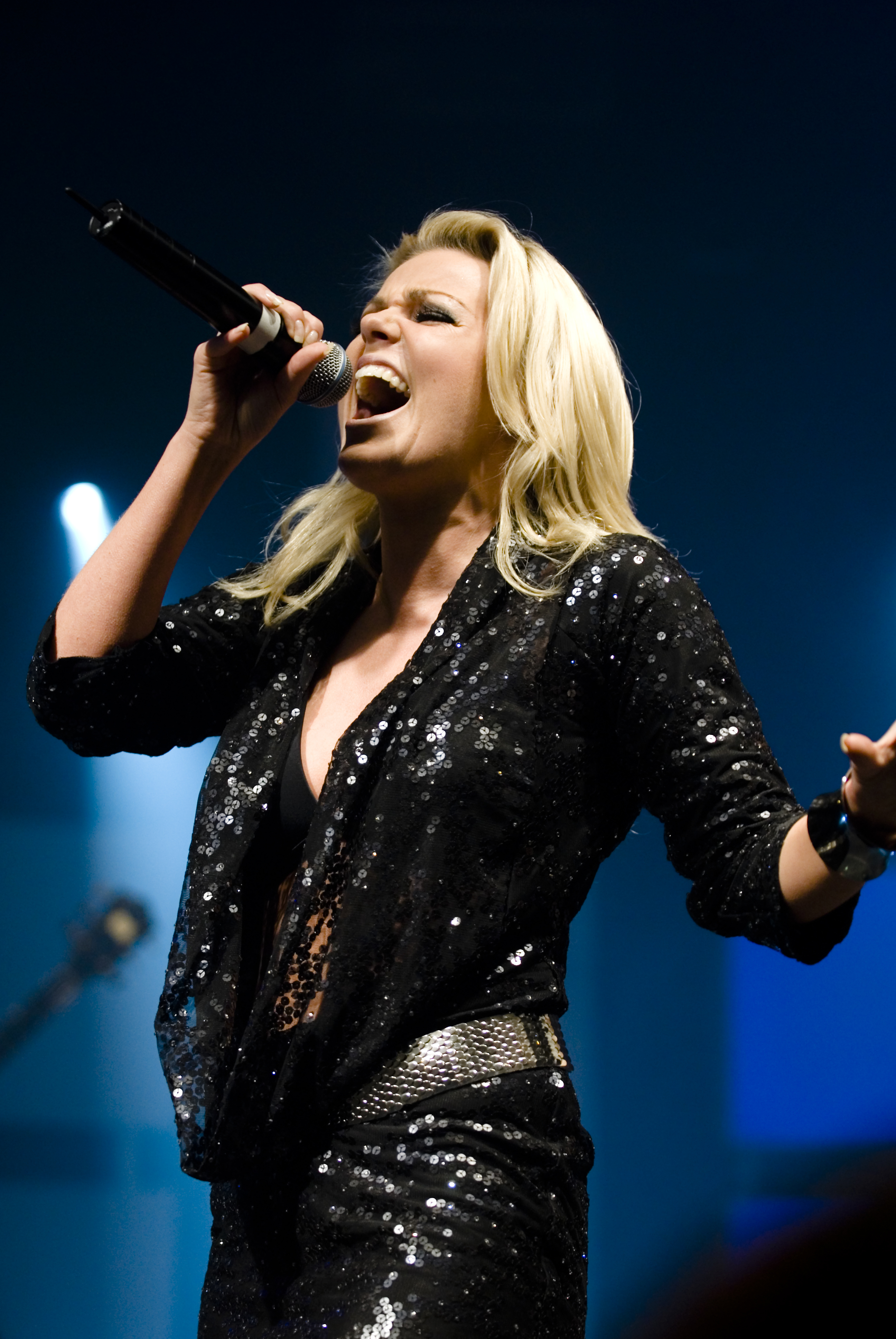
- Lina Rafn at Danish DJ Awards in 2007

Background information
- Also known as: Lina Rafn Sørensen
- Born: 12 August 1976 (age 49); Copenhagen, Denmark
- Origin: Copenhagen, Denmark
- Genres: Dance, trance, house, pop
- Occupation(s): Singer, songwriter, VJ, Model Reality television judge
- Instrument(s): Vocals, keyboard
- Years active: 1997–present
- Labels: Europa Recordings

Lina Rafn Sørensen (born 12 August 1976), known professionally as Lina Rafn is a Danish female singer, songwriter and producer active in the band Infernal. Additionally, she is a former VJ on the Danish music video channel The Voice TV Danmark, presenting various charts.

Lina Rafn was born in Copenhagen, and was a professional dancer from a very early age. She made her professional singing debut in 1997 with the founding of Infernal with Paw Lagermann and Søren Haahr. Infernal's debut single, "Sorti de L'enfer" was an instrumental dance-track.

From there on, she gained worldwide fame and recognition for her work. She is noted for her strong vocals and, along with Paw, created the hit "From Paris to Berlin". With the name of the band Infernal, she has released four albums and has sold millions of copies to date.

Her vocal trademark is a growl before hitting a high note.

Lina has also recordings under the name Paw & Lina with fellow Infernal member Paw Lagermann. Lina also recorded a track with Green Court called "Silent Heart".

Lina was a judge in the first and second season of the Danish X Factor alongside Thomas Blachman and Remee. She did not appear in the third season of the show in 2010 and was replaced by Pernille Rosendahl. She returned for the seventh season in 2014 as Ida Corr's replacement, joining Thomas Blachman and Remee (who replaced Anne Linnet).

Since 2014, Lina has been one of the owners of the nightclub Klosteret in Copenhagen.

== Personal life ==
Lina had her first daughter, Karmen, in the beginning of 2010 with her long-time boyfriend Kasper Pertho.

== Discography ==
=== Singles ===
Solo

Year	Single	Peak position	Certification
Year	Single	DAN	Certification
2011	"Forårsdag"	16	
2011	"Marie Marie"	24	
2011	"Sød musik"	29	

Featured in

Year	Single	Peak position	Certification
Year	Single	DAN	Certification
2009	"Silent Heart" (Green Court feat. Lina Rafn)	–	
2020	"Nytår Igen" (Jesu Brødre feat. Niels Olsen and Lina Rafn	–	

As part of Infernal

Refer to detailed Infernal discography

As duo Paw & Lina

Year	Single	Peak position	Certification
Year	Single	DAN	Certification
2011	"Stolt af mig selv?"	8	
