= Paw Lagermann =

Danish musician

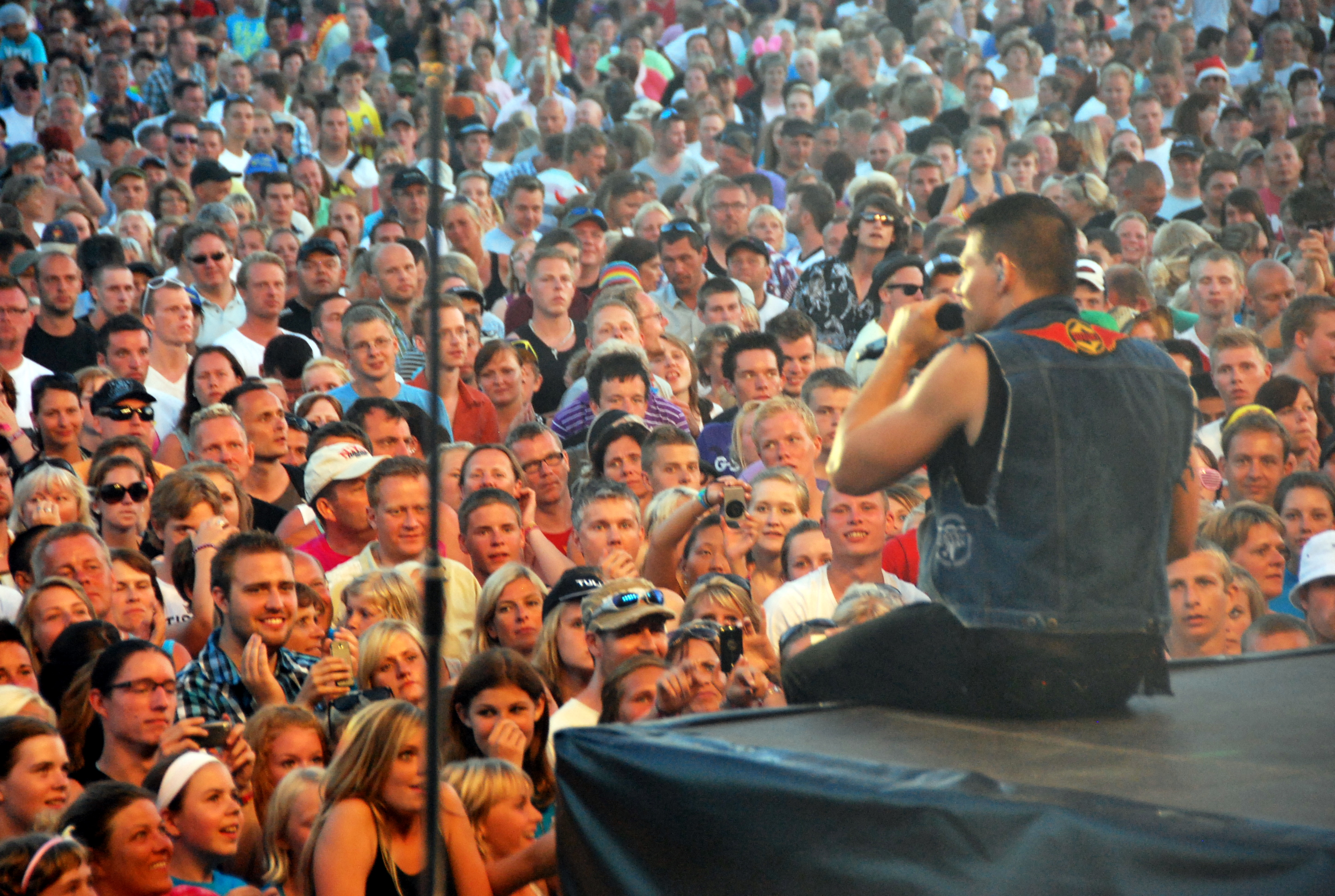
- Paw Lagermann during Infernal concert at Vig Festival 2010. (Photo: Lars Schmidt)

Background information
- Born: 30 July 1977 (age 47); Denmark
- Genres: Dance, trance, house, pop
- Occupation(s): Singer, songwriter
- Instrument(s): Vocals, keyboard
- Years active: 1997–present
- Labels: Europa Recordings

Paw Karl Lagermann (born 30 July 1977 in Vanløse) is a Danish singer, songwriter and record producer.

Paw Lagermann has been a member of the Danish pop duo Infernal since 1997. He also has recordings under the name Paw & Lina with fellow Infernal member Lina Rafn.

== Discography ==
As part of Infernal

Refer to detailed Infernal discography

As Paw & Lina

Year	Single	Peak position	Certification
Year	Single	DAN	Certification
2011	"Stolt af mig selv?"	8	
