= Copenhagen Pride =

Annual LGBT event in Copenhagen

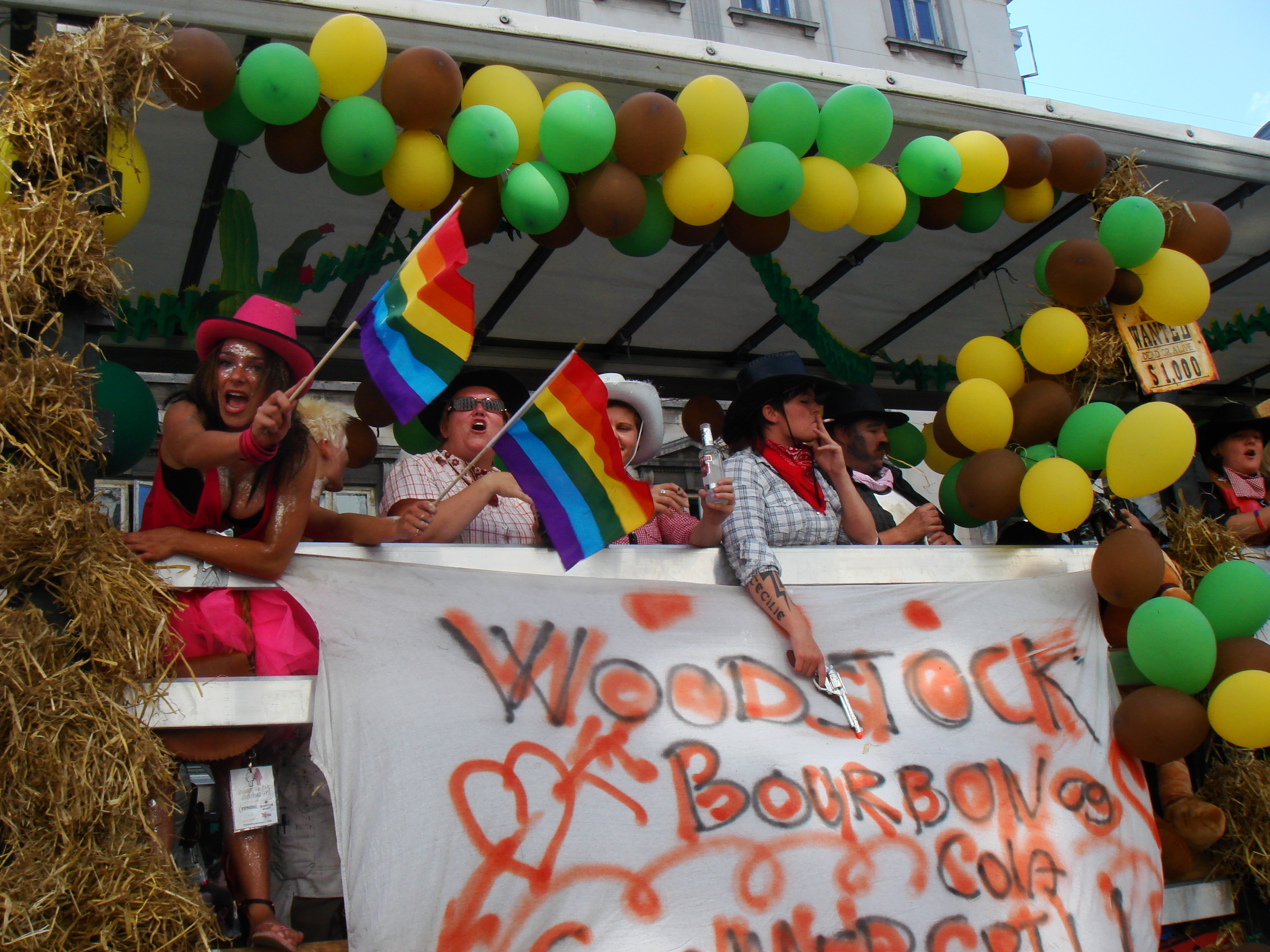
- Copenhagen Pride Parade 2008
- Status: active
- Genre: festival
- Frequency: annually
- Locations: Copenhagen, Denmark
- Years active: 1996-
- Website: www.copenhagenpride.dk

Copenhagen Pride is Denmark's largest annual Human Rights festival, focused on LGBTQ issues. It involves the entire capital Copenhagen and is held in August. A colourful and festive occasion, it combines political issues with concerts, films and a parade. The focal point is the City Hall Square in the city centre. From around 2012 the festival usually opened on the Wednesday of Pride Week, culminating on the Saturday with a parade. In 2017, some 25,000 people took part in the parade with floats and flags, and more than 300,000 people were out in the streets to experience it.

In 2022, Copenhagen Pride takes place over nine days from Saturday 13 August to Sunday 21 August. This is the longest Copenhagen Pride except for when the city hosted EuroPride (1996) and WorldPride (2021).

In addition to the Copenhagen Pride, there is a smaller annual pride in Aarhus and the MIX Copenhagen LGBT film festival.

== History ==
Copenhagen Pride began in 1996 when Copenhagen was the European Capital of Culture and hosted the EuroPride event. From 1998 onwards the festival was called Mermaid Pride and from 2004 onwards Copenhagen Pride. During the first years the festival was held in June, but in 1999 it was moved to August. The city's pride festival has been held every year since 1996, one of the outstanding events being held in connection with the World Outgames in 2009. In addition to the summer festival, the first Copenhagen Winter Pride was held in February 2015. In 2017 Copenhagen Pride won the bid to host WorldPride in 2021 that was an 11-day celebration of love, equality and human rights. WorldPride 2021 was combined with EuroGames hosted by the LGBT sports organisation, Pan Idræt.

== Chairpersons ==
- 1996: Michael Nord
- 1999: Alis Engberg
- 2000: Stine Ringvig
- 2001: Klaus Bondam/Helle Cobold
- 2002: Helle Cobold/John Møgelvang
- 2003 - 2004: John Bertelsen
- 2005 - 2006: Thomas Bilgram
- 2007: Morten Hougaard
- 2008: Martin Fønss Dufke
- 2008 - 2012: Ole Santos
- 2013 - 2021: Lars Henriksen
- 2021 - 2024: Lars Henriksen (Political Chairperson) and Benjamin Hansen (Organisational Chairperson)
- 2024: Benjamin Hansen

The daily management of the organisation is led by a Head of Secretariat, currently Steve Taylor.

== Presenters ==
Presenters for various shows during the Pride week.

- 2001: Ramona Macho
- 2007: Audrey Castañeda
- 2008: Audrey Castañeda
- 2009: Audrey Castañeda, Dan Rachlin, Jim Lyngvild
- 2010: Jim Lyngvild
- 2011: Jim Lyngvild, Julie Berthelsen
- 2012: Jim Lyngvild, Julie Berthelsen
- 2013: Camilla Ottesen, Raz, Michael Carøe, Bill Holmberg
- 2014: Christian Vincent, Glamboy P (Patrick Spiegelberg), Megan Moore, Christina Bjørn
- 2015 Winter Pride: Glamboy P (Patrick Spiegelberg), Megan Moore
- 2015: Patrick Spiegelberg, Megan Moore, Christina Bjørn
- 2016: Ole Henriksen
- 2017: Megan Moore, Karen Sangvin, Sofie Linde
- 2018: Megan Moore, Karen Sangvin, Abdel Aziz Mahmoud, Jakob Steen Olsen
- 2019: Megan Moore, Sara Bro

== Official Pride songs ==
Pride song is a song which since 2009, has been chosen, when relevant, to represent Copenhagen Pride.

- 2009: Arnar Thor Vidarsson – "Pride"
- 2011: Hera Björk – "Feel the Love Tonight"
- 2012: Claus Nors feat. Julie Berthelsen – "Movin' to the Groovin'"
- 2013: Army of Lovers – "Crucified (2013)"
- 2014: Lucaléy – "Dance To The Drum Of Our Hearts"
- 2015: Patrick Spiegelberg – "Dig og mig mod verden"
- 2016: Jonas Hedquist – "Survivors"

== Artists ==
Musicians and other artists who have performed at various shows arranged by Copenhagen Pride.

- 2010: Vengaboys, Patrick Spiegelberg, Ida Corr, Great Garlic Girls, Annikafiore, Matilde, RebeccaMaria, Katrine Brøndsted, Karen, Thomas Holm, Silas & Kat, Camille Jones, Apollo, Rune RK, Dan Rachlin
- 2011: Laust Sonne, Rasmus Walther, Hera Björk, Electric Lady Lab, Erann DD, Joey Moe, Cecilie Fleur, Rune RK, CVlara Sofie, Morten Breum, Xander, Sarah, Nicoline Toft, Rasmus Thude, Alexander Brown, Morten Hampenberg og Yepha
- 2012: Hera Björk, the Infernal duo Paw & Lina, Rune RK, Jean von Baden, Rosa Lux, Alberte og Josefine Winding, George Michael Jam
- 2013: Army of Lovers, Hera Björk, Emmelie de Forest, BLITZKIDS mvt., Le Freak, Zahra, Shila Mariposa + DJ Kelde, Unico feat. Nanamarie, Lynx & Pico feat. Glamboy P (Patrick Spiegelberg), Martin Kundsen, Kat Stephie Holst & DJ Kende, David Jay, 8Ball feat. Gustav, Michael Carøe, Juanna ft. DanyComaro, DeeJay Mikael Costa A Friend in London
- 2014: DJ Tonny Liljenberg, Thomas Buttenschøn, Lucaléy, Sada Vidoo, World of Girls, Garek, Mettro, Silje Svea og Lynx, Our Lady J, Basim, Zindy, Sassa, Holestar, Campari Camping, Luux, Cisilia, Hector Lopez, Sy Lee, Annella Zarina Luckcrown, Scarletta Jackson, Divet, Glamboy P (Patrick Spiegelberg), Megan Moore, Pink Pistols, Hvide Løgne, Chili Goes Chili, Fjer, Amanda Wium, Freja Kirk, Tek Yon, DJ Mai Schaarup, Conchita Wurst
- 2015 Winter Pride: Glamboy P (Patrick Spiegelberg), DJ Tonny Liljenberg, Betty Bronx, Christina Chanée, Harley Queen
- 2015: Thomaz Ransmyr, Rickard Söderberg, Magnus Carlsson, Anna Book, Silje Svea & Lynx, Jonas Hedqvist, Ida Corr, Dj Dragdaddy & The C.U.N.T. Collective, Clara Sofie, Patrick Spiegelberg, Campari Camping, Thomas Madvig & Simon Witzansky, Borneland - live, Megan Moore, Steed Lord, Bronx & Ashibah, MNEK, DJ Robin Skouteris, Lighthouse X, O’HARA feat. Ramona Macho, Danny Polaris, Scarlette, Royal Feet Factory, Vinnie Who, Glitter Boys vs. Witzansky
- 2016: Alex Palmieri, Amanda Wium, David Lavi, Erika, Fallulah, Danny, Jonas, Efterfesten
- 2017: Peaches, Nabiha, Bryan Rice, Sada Vidoo, Katya, Aura
- 2018: Anne Linnet, Sigmund, Ida Corr, Silas Holst, Ivy, Iris Gold, Zebra Katz

== See also ==
- Pride parade
- EuroPride
- Nuuk Pride
- LGBT rights in Denmark
- LGBT rights in the Faroe Islands
- LGBT rights in Greenland
