= Homophile movement =

Collective term for LGBT organisations of the 1950–60s

The homophile movement is a collective term for the main organisations and publications supporting and representing sexual minorities in the 1950s to 1960s around the world. The name comes from the term homophile, which was commonly used by these organisations in an effort to deemphasize the sexual aspect of homosexuality. At least some of these organisations are considered to have been more cautious than both earlier and later LGBT organisations; in the U.S., the nationwide coalition of homophile groups disbanded after older members clashed with younger members who had become more radical after the Stonewall riots of 1969.

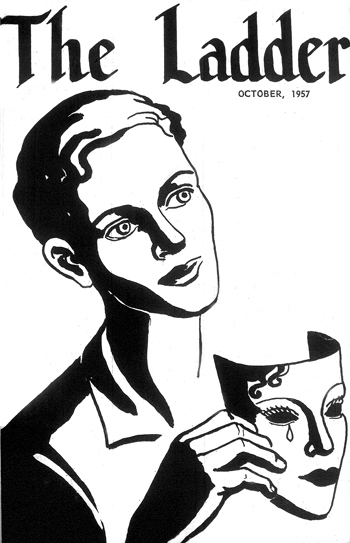
The October 1957 edition of The Ladder, mailed to hundreds of women in the San Francisco area, urged women to take off their masks. The motif of masks and unmasking was prevalent in the homophile era, prefiguring the political strategy of coming out and giving the Mattachine Society its name.

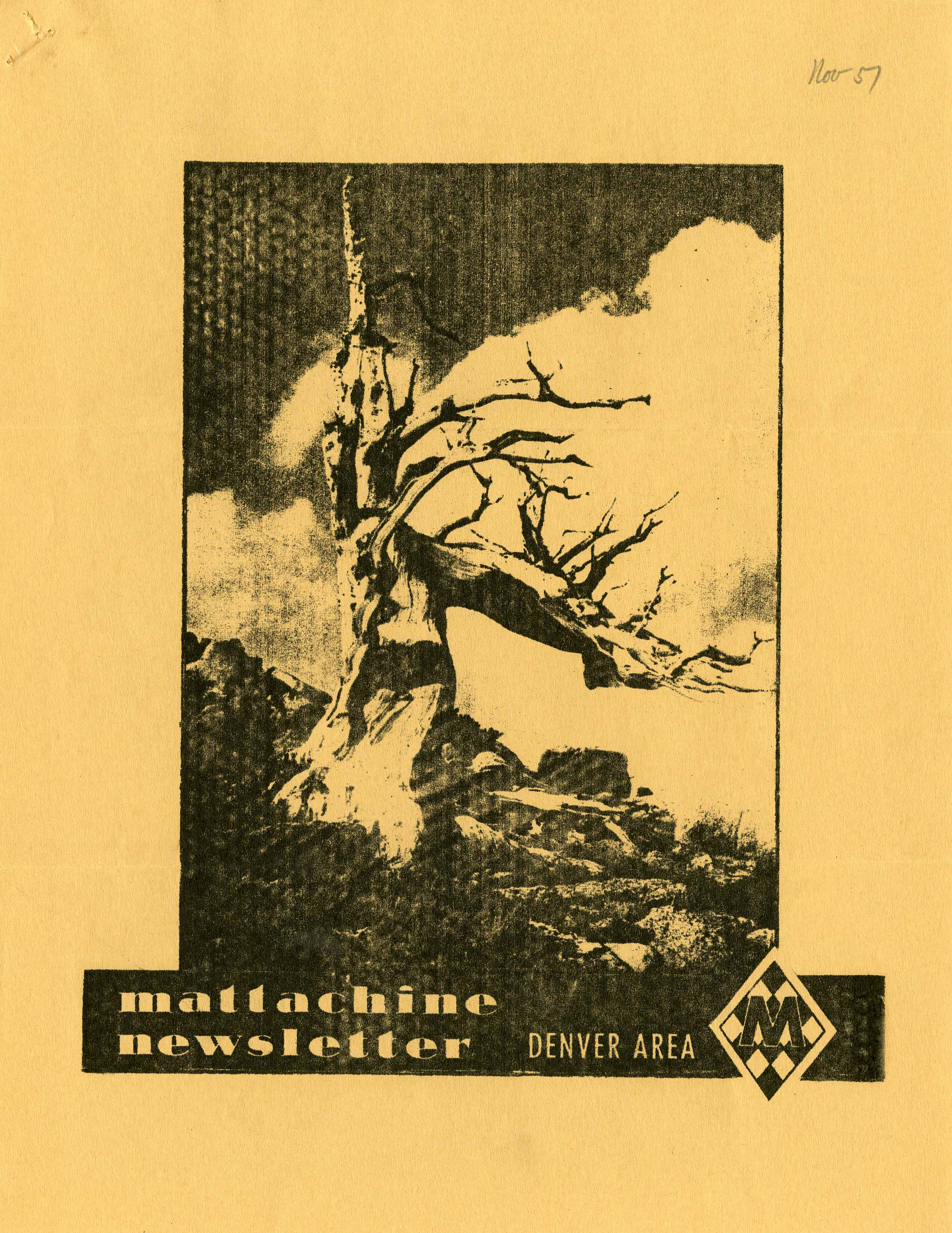
Mattachine Newsletter, Colorado, 1957, Collections of the Smithsonian's National Museum of American History, Archives Center, Collection AC1146, Box 2, folder 10

== History ==
The homosexual organizations and publications of the 1950s and 1960s, which commonly used the term "homophile", are now known collectively as the homophile movement. The term "homophile" was coined by German psychoanalyst Karl-Günther Heimsoth in 1924, before being popularized by the Dutch COC. Proponents of the term hoped to emphasize the romantic rather than sexual aspect of same-sex relationships by replacing the -sexual suffix with the Greek root "philos," meaning love. They hoped to distinguish further by describing people as homophiles, while reserving "homosexual" to describe sexual activity itself.

After the gains made by the first homosexual movement of the late 19th and early 20th centuries, the vibrant homosexual subcultures of the 1920s and 1930s became silent as war engulfed Europe. Germany was the traditional home of such movements and activists, (Note: The world's first gay rights organization, Scientific-Humanitarian Committee, was founded in Germany in 1897 by Magnus Hirschfeld. Ernst Burchard, Karl Heinrich Ulrichs, and Max Spohr were also early gay rights leaders in Germany.) but in Nazi Germany, gay literature was burned, gay organizations were dissolved, and many gay men imprisoned in concentration camps. The Swiss journal Der Kreis ("the circle") was the primary homosexual publication in Europe and the only one to publish during the Nazi era. Der Kreis was edited by Anna Vock, and later Karl Meier; the group gradually shifted from being female-dominated to male-dominated through the 1930s, as the tone of the magazine simultaneously became less militant.

After the war, organizations began to re-form, such as the Dutch COC in 1946. Other, new organizations arose, including Forbundet af 1948 ("League of 1948"), founded by Axel Axgil in Denmark, with Helmer Fogedgaard publishing an associated magazine called Vennen (The Friend) from January 1949 until 1953. Fogedgaard used the pseudonym "Homophilos", introducing the concept of "homophile" in May 1950, unaware that the word had been presented as an alternative term a few months previously by Jaap van Leeuwen, one of the founders of the Dutch COC. The word soon spread among members of the emerging post-war movement who were happy to emphasize the respectable romantic side of their relationships over genital sexuality.

A Swedish branch of Forbundet af 1948 was formed in 1949 and a Norwegian branch in 1950. The Swedish organization became independent under the name Riksförbundet för sexuellt likaberättigande (RFSL, "Federation for Sexual Equality") in 1950, led by Allan Hellman. The same year in the United States, the Mattachine Society was formed, and other organizations such as ONE, Inc. (1952) and the Daughters of Bilitis (1955) soon followed. Daughters of Bilitis was the first lesbian homophile organization in the U.S., and it emerged in the context of alienation felt by women in male-dominated Mattachine Society and ONE. In 1954, nearly 60,000 copies of ONE's magazine were distributed, though its actual readership was likely much higher due to the practice of surreptitiously circulating existing copies. Homophile organizations elsewhere include Arcadie (1954) in France and the British Homosexual Law Reform Society (founded 1958).

These groups are generally considered to have been politically cautious, in comparison to the LGBT movements that both preceded and followed them. Historian Michael Sibalis describes the belief of the French homophile group Arcadie, "that public hostility to homosexuals resulted largely from their outrageous and promiscuous behaviour; homophiles would win the good opinion of the public and the authorities by showing themselves to be discreet, dignified, virtuous and respectable." However, while some were prepared to come out, they did risk severe persecution, and some figures within the Homophile movement such as the American communist Harry Hay were more radical.

In 1951, the president and vice-president of the Dutch COC initiated an International Congress of European homophile groups, which resulted in the formation of the International Committee for Sexual Equality (ICSE). The ICSE brought together, among other groups, the Forbundet of 1948 (Scandinavia), the Riksförbundet för Sexuellt Likaberättigande (Sweden), Arcadie (France), Der Kreis (Swiss), and, later, ONE (U.S.). Historian Leila Rupp describes the ICSE as a classic example of transnational organizing; "It created a network across national borders, nurtured a transnational homophile identity, and engaged in activism designed to change both laws and minds." However, the ICSE failed to last beyond the early 1960s due to poor attendance at meetings, lack of active leaders, and failure of members to pay dues.

By the early-1960s, lesbian, gay, bisexual, and transgender people in the United States were forming more visible communities, and this was reflected in the political strategies of American homophile groups. Frank Kameny, an American astronomer and gay rights activist, had co-founded the Mattachine Society in Washington, D.C., in 1961. While the society did not take much political activism to the streets at first, Kameny and several members attended the 1963 March on Washington, where having seen the methods used by Black civil rights activists, they then applied them to the Homophile movement. Kameny had also been inspired by the black power movements slogan "Black is Beautiful", coining his own term "Gay is Good". From the mid-1960s, they engaged in picketing and sit-ins, identifying themselves in public space for the first time. Kameny further implemented the use of social protest methods of advocating for rights through his timeline as an activist. While earlier in his career as an activist, he as well as other organizers picketed out the White House. Not only did Kameny continue his work with the Mattachine society, but furthered on to work with other notable gay rights groups like ACT UP, where he continued to use civil disobedience in his efforts to "...accord gays and lesbians the same rights and privileges enjoyed by all citizens." Formed in 1964, the San Franciscan Society for Individual Rights (SIR) had a new openness and a more participatory democratic structure. SIR was focused on building community, and sponsored drag shows, dinners, bridge clubs, bowling leagues, softball games, field trips, art classes, and meditation groups. In 1966, SIR opened the nation's first gay and lesbian community center, and by 1968 they had over 1000 members, making them the largest homophile organization in the country. The world's first gay bookstore had opened in New York the year before. A 1965 gay picket held in front of Independence Hall in Philadelphia, according to some historians, marked the beginning of the modern gay rights movement. Meanwhile, in San Francisco in 1966, transgender street prostitutes in the poor neighborhood of Tenderloin rioted against police harassment at a popular all-night restaurant, the Compton Cafeteria. These and other activities of public resistance to oppression led to a feeling of Gay Liberation that was soon to give a name to a new movement.

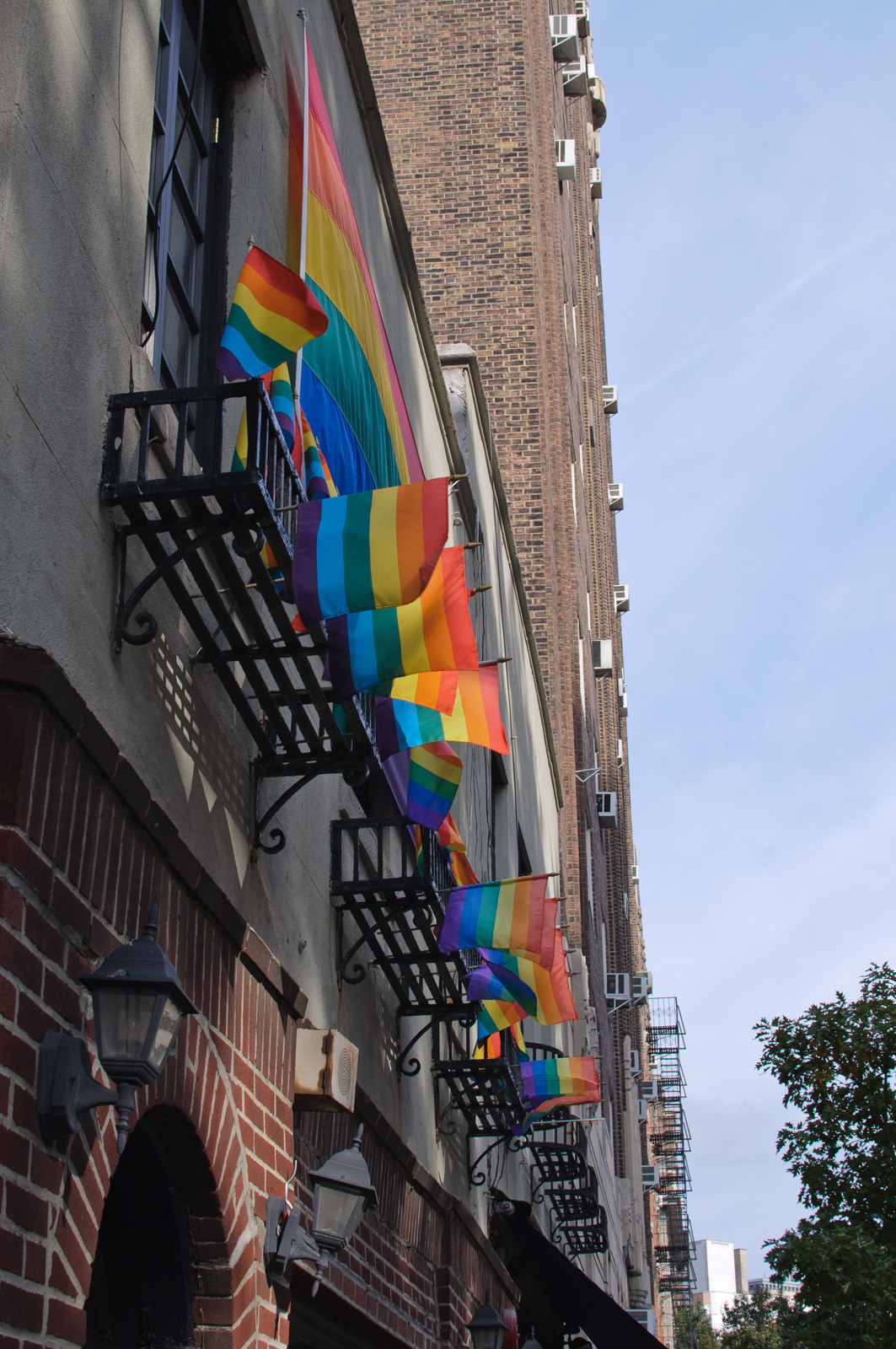
Stonewall Inn, Greenwich Village, is now a National Historical Landmark.

In 1963, homophile organizations in New York City, Philadelphia, and Washington, D.C. joined to form East Coast Homophile Organizations (ECHO) to more closely coordinate their activities. The success of ECHO inspired other homophile groups across the country to explore the idea of forming a national homophile umbrella group. This was done with the formation in 1966 of the North American Conference of Homophile Organizations (NACHO, rhymes with Waco). NACHO held annual conferences, helped start dozens of local gay groups across the country and issued position papers on a variety of LGBT-related issues. It organized national demonstrations, including a May 1966 action against military discrimination that included the country's first gay motorcade. Through its legal defense fund, NACHO challenged anti-gay laws and regulations ranging from immigration issues and military service to the legality of serving alcohol to homosexuals. NACHO disbanded after a contentious 1970 conference at which older members and younger members, radicalized in the wake of the 1969 Stonewall riots, clashed. Gay Sunshine magazine declared the convention "the battle that ended the homophile movement". The gay liberation movement, which emerged around this time, replaced the term "homophile" by a new set of terminology such as gay, lesbian, and bisexual.

== Organisations and publications ==
Denmark

- Forbundet af 1948 (1948–?) and Pan (1954–present)
- International Homosexual World Organisation (IHWO), 1952? – first half of the 1970s, political since second half of the 1960s, founded by Axel and Eigil Axgil, German chapter named: Internationale Homophile Welt-Organisation)

France

- Arcadie (journal, published 1954–1982), and organisation with the same name. Often published with the subtitle "Mouvement homophile de France".

Netherlands

- COC (1946–present) is the earliest homophile organisation. Their first magazine, Vriendschap (Friendship), was published from 1949 to 1964 and digitally available at IHLIA LGBT Heritage. They also produced a number of other publications.

Sweden

- RFSL, Riksförbundet för sexuellt likaberättigande—"Federation for Sexual Equality", known since 2007 as the "Swedish Federation for Lesbian, Gay, Bisexual and Transgender Rights" (1950–present)

United Kingdom

- Homosexual Law Reform Society (1958–1970 when it was renamed as the Sexual Law Reform Society). The HLRS was formed as a response to the 1957 Wolfenden report. Most of the members were heterosexual.
- Campaign for Homosexual Equality (1964–present)

United States

- Vice Versa: America's Gayest Magazine (1947–1948), the first lesbian periodical in the United States, was free. Lisa Ben (an anagram of "lesbian"), the 25-year-old Los Angeles secretary who created Vice Versa, chose the name "because in those days our kind of life was considered a vice".
- Knights of the Clock (c. 1950–?); first interracial gay organization. Focused on social activities but also worked on employment and housing concerns for interracial couples.
- The Mattachine Society (1950–1987) and the Mattachine Review (1955–1966); Homosexual Citizen, (published by the Washington chapter, 1966–?)
- The Daughters of Bilitis (1955–present) and The Ladder (1956–1972); Focus (published by the Boston chapter, 1971–1983); Sisters, (National, published in San Francisco, 1971–1975).
- ONE, Inc. (1952–present) and One magazine (1953–1972); Homophile Studies (1958–1964)
- The League for Civil Education (1960 or 1961–?) and The LCE News (1961–?)
- The Janus Society (1962–1969) and DRUM magazine (1964–1969). A racy gay-male oriented magazine, DRUM reached a circulation of 10,000 by 1966.
- Society for Individual Rights (1964–1976) and Vector (1965–1977)
- The Homosexual Law Reform Society (1965–1969)
- Phoenix Society for Individual Freedom, Kansas City MO, and The Phoenix: Midwest Homophile Voice, (1966–1972)
- Society Advocating Mutual Equality (SAME) (1966–1968), Rock Island IL, "The Challenger" newsletter
- Homophile Action League (Philadelphia) and the HAL Newsletter (1969–1970)

International

- International Committee for Sexual Equality (ICSE) (1951–1963); Formed by the Dutch COC and functioned as an umbrella organization that united many of the above national organizations from Europe and the United States. Published two German language periodicals, ICSE Kurier and ICSE-PRESS.

== See also ==
- LGBTQ history in the United States
- Straight ally
- Terminology of homosexuality
