= LGBTQ rights in Denmark =

- Location of Denmark (dark green) – in Europe (light green & dark grey) – in the European Union (light green) – [Legend]
- Legal status: Legal since 1933, age of consent equalized in 1977
- Gender identity: Transgender persons allowed to change legal gender without a diagnosis, hormone therapy, surgery or sterilization
- Military: LGBT people allowed to openly serve in the Danish military
- Discrimination protections: Sexual orientation and gender identity/expression protections (see below)

Family rights
- Recognition of relationships: Registered partnership 1989-2012; Same-sex marriage since 2012
- Adoption: Full adoption rights since 2010

Danish lesbian, gay, bisexual, transgender, and queer (LGBTQ) rights are some of the most extensive in the world. In 2023, ILGA-Europe ranked Denmark as the third most LGBTQ-supportive country in Europe. Polls consistently show that same-sex marriage support is nearly universal amongst the Danish population.

In Denmark, same-sex sexual activity was legalized in 1933, and since 1977, the age of consent has been equally set to 15, regardless of sexual orientation or gender. Denmark was the first country in the world to grant legal recognition to same-sex unions in the form of registered partnerships in 1989. On 7 June 2012, the law was replaced by a new same-sex marriage law, which came into effect on 15 June 2012.

Discrimination on the grounds of sexual orientation was entirely prohibited in 1996. Denmark has allowed same-sex couples to jointly adopt since 2010, while previously allowing stepchild adoptions and limited co-guardianship rights for non-biological parents. LGBTQ people are also allowed to serve openly in the Danish military. Like its Scandinavian neighbours, Denmark has been described as one of the most LGBTQ-accepting countries in the world, with recent polls indicating that a large majority of Danes support same-sex marriage and adoption for LGBTQ couples. Copenhagen has frequently been referred to by publishers as one of the most gay-friendly cities in the world, famous for its annual Pride parade. Denmark's oldest LGBTQ organization, LGBT+ Danmark, was founded in 1948, under the name Kredsen af 1948 (Circle of 1948).

== Legality of same-sex sexual activity ==
King Christian V's Danish Code from 1683 outlawed crimes against nature (Danish: omgængelse mod naturen), a collective term for a group of sexual acts including sodomy and bestiality; the prescribed punishment was that of burning at the stake. Although the Penal Code of 1866 removed the death penalty, crimes against nature remained illegal and were punishable by imprisonment.

The Penal Code of 1930, which came into effect in 1933, decriminalized same-sex sexual activity between persons over the age of 18. Since 1977 the age of consent has been 15, regardless of sexual orientation or gender.

== Recognition of same-sex relationships ==
Registered partnerships (Danish: registreret partnerskab) were created by a law enacted on 7 June 1989, the world's first such law, and came into force on 1 October 1989. Registered partnerships had almost all the same qualities as marriage; all legal and fiscal rights and obligations were similar to those of opposite-sex marriage, with the major exception being that regulations by international treaties did not apply unless all signatories agree. Since 15 June 2012, entering into registered partnerships is no longer possible.

Same-sex marriage became legal in Denmark on 15 June 2012, after the Danish Parliament voted on 7 June in favour of a gender-neutral marriage law, including marriages in the Church of Denmark. The Danish Government originally proposed a same-sex marriage bill in Parliament on 14 March 2012. Parliament passed the bill by 85 votes to 24 on 7 June, and royal assent by Queen Margrethe II was granted five days later. The law entered into force on 15 June 2012, making Denmark one of the first countries in the world to legalise same-sex marriage.

== Adoption and family planning ==
Since 1999, a person in a same-sex registered partnership has been able to adopt his or her partner's biological children (known as stepchild adoption). Adoption by LGBTQ parents was previously only permitted in certain restricted situations, notably when a previous connection existed between the adopting parent and the child, such as being a family member or a foster child.

On 2 June 2006, the Danish Parliament voted to repeal a law that banned lesbian couples from accessing artificial insemination. In addition, when a lesbian couple has a child via in vitro fertilization, the non-biological parent has been written onto the birth certificate as the other natural parent since 2013.

Since 1 July 2010, same-sex couples may apply jointly for adoption. On 20 July 2014, a gay male couple became the first gay couple to adopt a foreign child, when they adopted a nine-month-old girl from South Africa.

According to statistics released by the Danish Broadcasting Corporation, 84 families had same-sex parents in 2013. That number had increased to 659 by mid-2018. In the Capital Region, the number grew from 42 to 293. According to 2019 statistics, about 27% of same-sex couples in Denmark were raising a child, whereas that figure was 43% for heterosexual couples.

== Military service ==
Openly gay, lesbian, bisexual and transgender soldiers serve without hindrance in all branches of the Danish Defence. Discrimination against gay, lesbian, bisexual and transgender soldiers in recruitment, placement and promotion is prohibited in Denmark. There are prominent openly gay military leaders in the Defence and there are no reported cases of threats to gays, morale, or national security. A 2010 study indicated that gay men in the Danish Defence show strength and are respected.

== Discrimination protections and hate crime laws ==
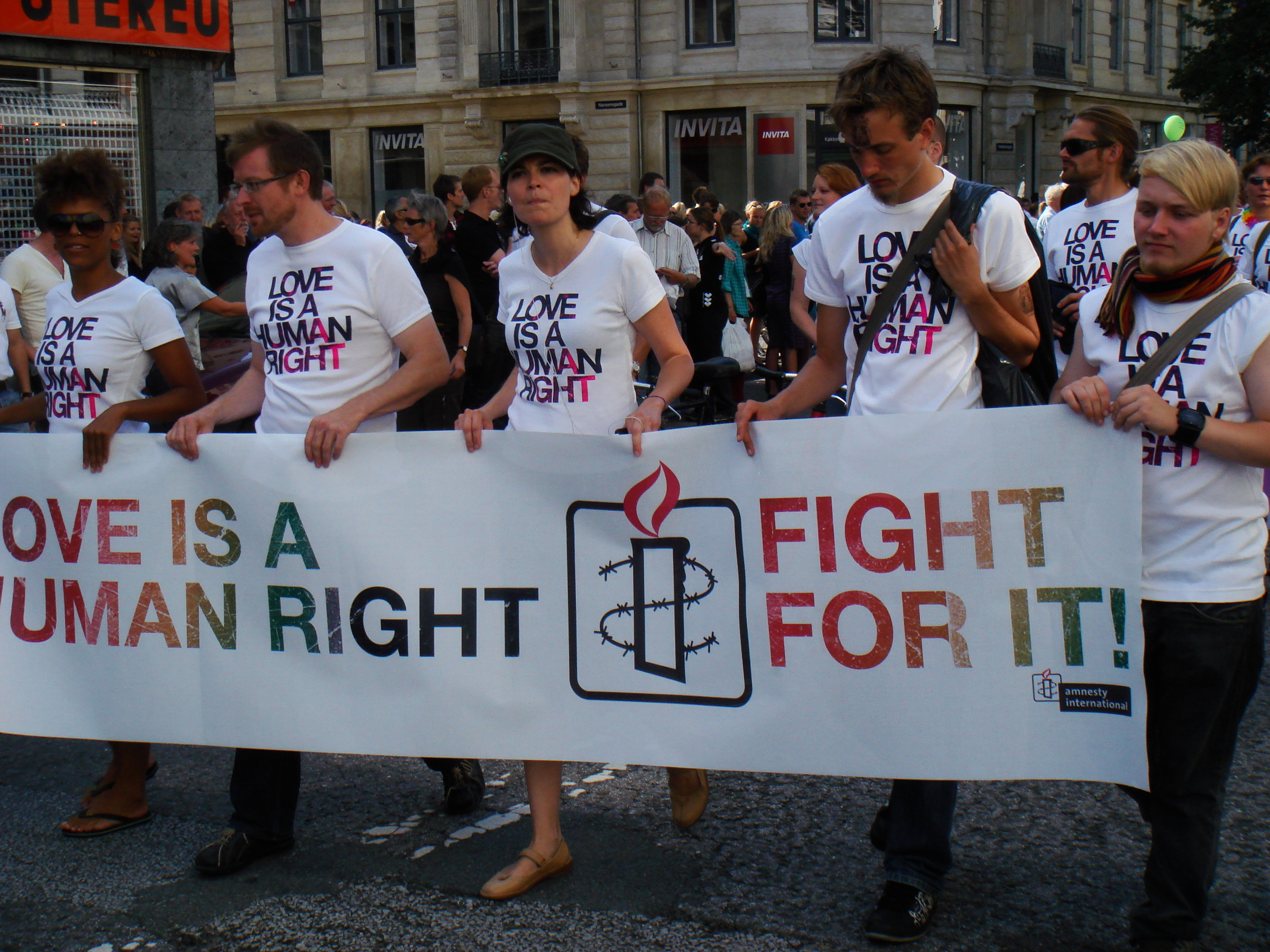

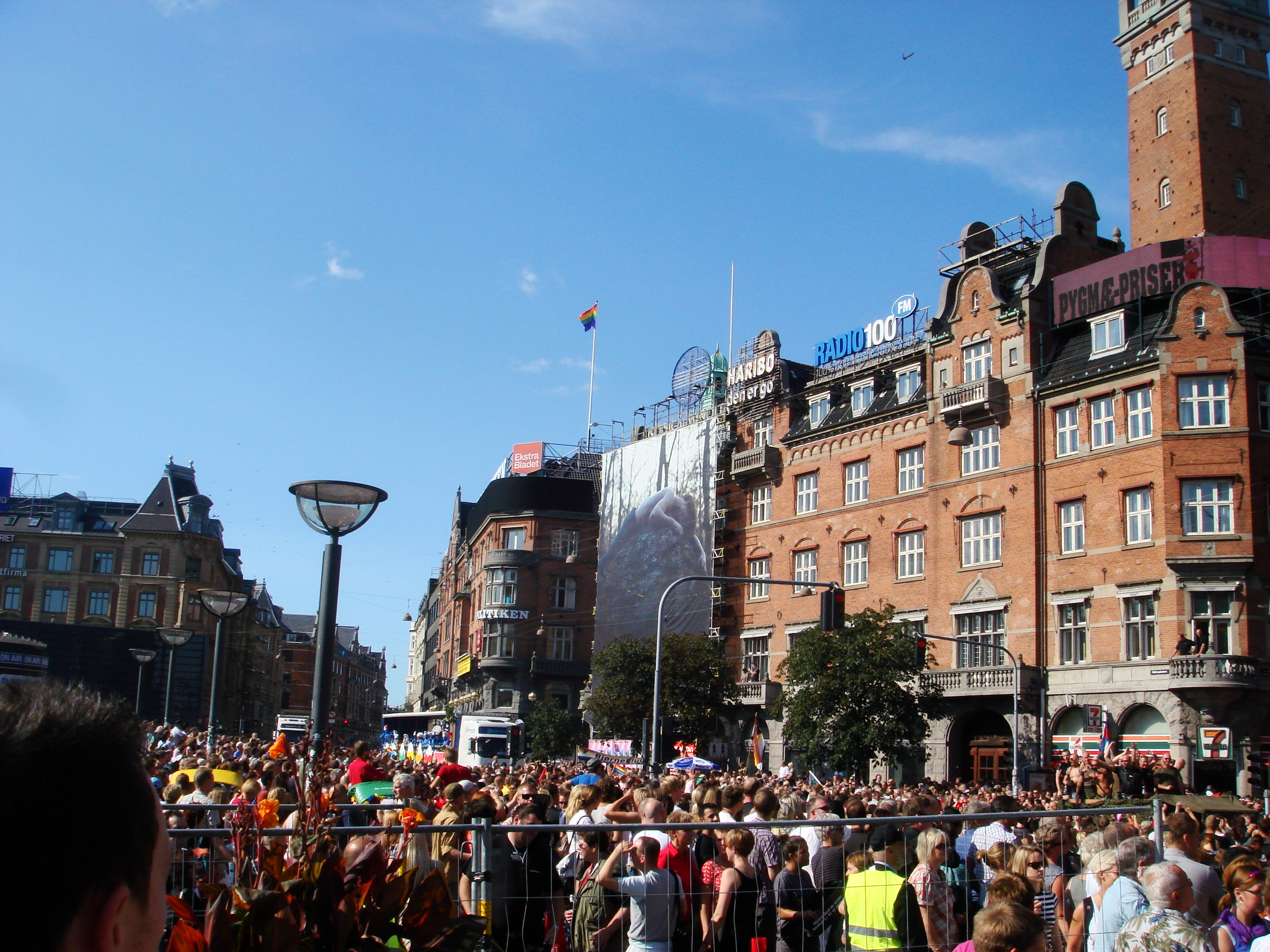
Copenhagen Pride in 2008

Danish law prohibits discrimination based on sexual orientation and gender identity or expression, among other categories. The Act on Prohibition of Unequal Treatment in the Labor Market (Danish: Lov om forbud mod forskelsbehandling på arbejdsmarkedet), adopted in 1996, defines "discrimination" as follows:

discrimination means any direct or indirect discrimination based on race, color, religion, political opinion, sexual orientation or national, social or ethnic origin.

Gender identity or expression is not explicitly listed, but a 2015 court ruling, in which a transgender woman filed suit against her former employer for alleged discrimination, held that gender identity or expression is included in the law.

In 2008, the Act on the Board of Equal Treatment (Danish: Lov om Ligebehandlingsnævnet) was passed, establishing the Board of Equal Treatment. Under the Act, the Board "shall consider complaints of differential treatment on the grounds of gender, race, colour, religion or belief, political opinion, sexual orientation, age, disability, or national, social or ethnic origin".

In addition, Denmark possesses hate crime legislation, following amendments to the Penal Code in 2004, which provides additional penalties for crimes committed against people because of their sexual orientation.

According to a report published in August 2019, 89% of LGBT respondents reported not being discriminated against or harassed in the workplace, 78% were overall satisfied with their jobs and 69% reported being open about their sexual orientation to colleagues. Only 9% felt they could not be open about their sexual orientation, and 8% stated they had been the victim of discrimination and harassment.

== Transgender rights ==
The Act on Sterilisation and Castration (Danish: Lov om sterilisation og kastration), adopted in June 1929, was one of the first gender change laws in the world. Danish transgender woman Lili Elbe, who inspired the 2015 movie The Danish Girl, was one of the first identifiable recipients of sex reassignment surgery. She transitioned in Germany in 1930, and later had her sex and name legally changed on her Danish passport. The first person to successfully undertake a legal gender change in Denmark, which required undergoing sex reassignment surgery, was American Christine Jorgensen in the early 1950s. She underwent an orchiectomy and a penectomy in Copenhagen in 1951 and 1952, respectively.

In February 2013, a Guatemalan woman became the first transgender person to be granted asylum in Denmark because of persecution in her native country. However, she was put in a facility for men, where she had been sexually assaulted several times and was initially refused. Authorities reopened the case when she proved her life would be in danger if she returned to Guatemala.

In June 2014, the Danish Parliament voted 59–52 to remove the requirement of a mental disorder diagnosis and surgery with irreversible sterilization during the process of a legal sex change. Since 1 September 2014, Danes over 18 years of age who wish to apply for a legal sex change can do so by stating that they want to change their documentation, followed by a six-month-long "reflection period" to confirm the request.

Pending a decision by the World Health Organization (WHO) to remove gender identity disorder (GID) from its list of mental illnesses, Denmark initially postponed a unilateral change. Citing a lack of progress at the WHO, the Danish Parliament decided to remove GID from the National Board of Health's list of mental illnesses in 2016. The change came into effect on 1 January 2017. It was the second country to do this, after France which did so in 2010. In June 2018, the WHO replaced the diagnosis of GID with gender incongruence and reclassified it as a sexual health condition.

Besides male and female, Danish passports are available with an "X" sex descriptor.

=== Access to healthcare ===
Access to transgender health care in Denmark has become more restricted since 2023, due to concerns about the increase in number of patients transitioning. Danish guidelines published in 2023 recommend the use of puberty blockers on transgender patients at either Tanner stage two or three, as a means of buying time for patients to consider their gender more fully before making a decision.

==== Children ====
If a child under the age of ten shows adequate signs of gender dysphoria, their parents are given advisory information.

==== Adolescents ====
If a child over the age of ten shows adequate signs of gender dysphoria, they are then required to undergo at least five investigative interviews, along with a psychiatric evaluation, and informational sessions regarding hormone therapy.

As part of the investigation, school and municipal records are pulled.

Patients at tanner stages II and III are allowed to be administered puberty blockers in order to prevent permanent developments while further exploration is undertaken.

Mental illness is not necessarily a barrier to treatment, however if the doctor believes the dysphoria could be an aspect of said mental illness - in particular psychosis and autism, then it can be. Other contraindications that can serve as barriers to treatment include a history of abuse, self harm, and suicidal ideations.

From the age of 15, the patient can consent to hormone treatment without parental involvement. Surgical options are not offered until the age of 18.

==== Adult ====
Wait times for hormone therapy in Denmark are generally around 11-16 months, and wait times for bottom surgery in Denmark last 4-6 years. This leads many trans adults to seek healthcare abroad.

Access to treatment requires several psychological sessions, during which patients report being required to present in a way reflecting stereotypical gender roles (i.e. trans men having to give ‘male’ answers).

== Sex education ==
Denmark has one of the most comprehensive sex education lessons in the world, which includes information on safe sex, prevention against sexually transmitted infections, abortion, contraception, puberty, sexual relationships, family life, gender and sexuality, and diversity. Sex education lessons are mandatory in all primary and secondary public schools, and also deal with other health issues, including drug use and alcohol.

In 1981, Gå-Ud-Gruppen ("The Outreach Group") set up supplementary sex education lessons giving information about same-sex relationships to senior classes in state schools.

In 2008, the Danish Family Planning Association introduced a new online nationwide campaign for sex education. By 2009, 88,300 pupils were participating.

== Blood donation ==
In May 2014, six Danish political parties called on Health Minister Nick Hækkerup to lift a ban on blood donations from men who have sex with men (MSM). In August 2016, it was reported that a majority of MPs in Parliament supported lifting the ban. The Danish People's Party, the Social Democrats and The Alternative all expressed support for a proposal put forward by MP Morten Østergaard to permit blood donations by MSMs. In March 2020, Denmark implemented a policy allowing gay and bisexual men to donate blood provided they have not had sex in four months. The deferral period will be waived if the individual is in a stable monogamous relationship.

In July 2024, the deferral was amended to no longer discriminate between heterosexual and homosexual anal sex.

== LGBTQ rights movement in Denmark ==
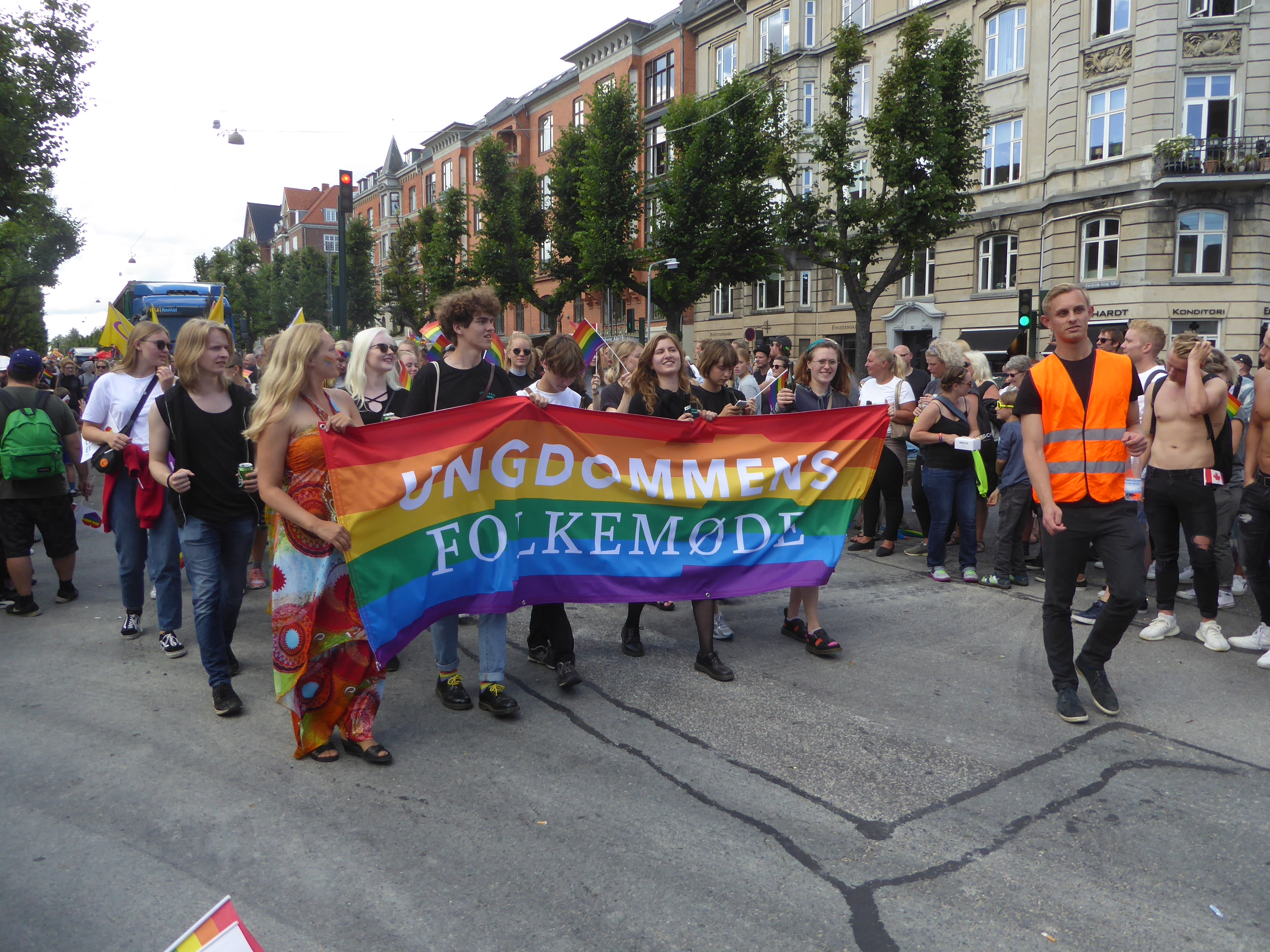
Participants at the 2017 Copenhagen Pride parade

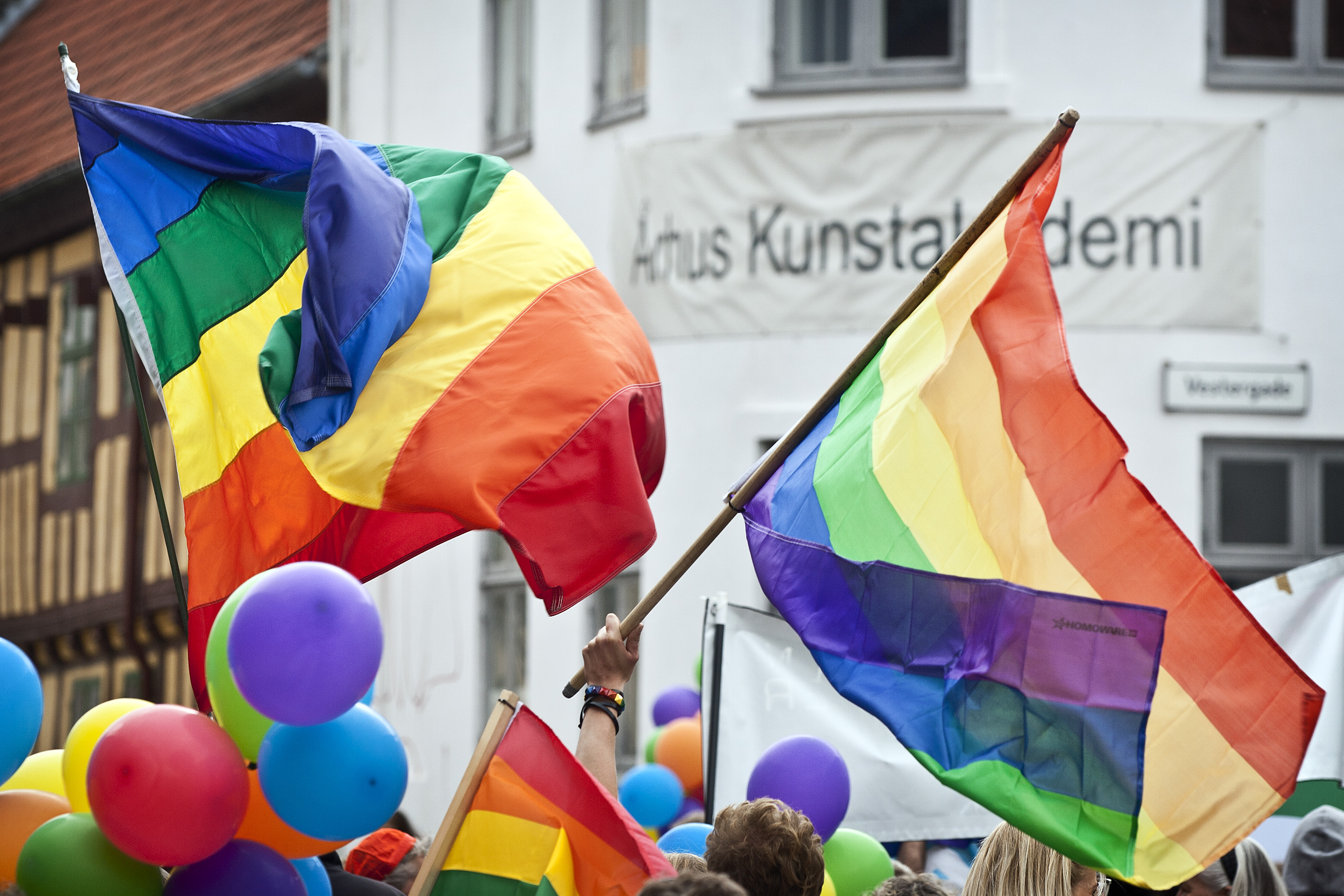
Rainbow flags in Aarhus, 2012

Danish LGBTQ advocacy groups include LGBT+ Danmark, founded in 1948 under the name Kredsen af 1948 (Circle of 1948) and later changing its name to Forbundet af 1948 (Federation of 1948). The group officially registered as an association under the name Landsforeningen for homofile (National Association for Homosexuals) in 1969. The organisation's founder was Axel Axgil. Axel and his partner Eigil Axgil were the first same-sex couple to enter into a registered partnership in Denmark, and therefore the first in the world, in 1989. The first gay demonstration in Denmark occurred in 1971 to mark the second anniversary of the Stonewall riots. From the 1970s onwards, numerous gay bars and clubs opened, and societal acceptance began to grow. In 1974, several members of the Federation of 1948, along with members of the Red Stocking Movement, split to form their own organization, the Lesbian Movement (Lesbisk Bevægelse). Other groups include Lambda, based in Odense, as well as Q-Factor, Bigruppen and Dunst.

Copenhagen Pride is an annual pride event held in August in Copenhagen. It was first held in 1996 under the name Mermaid Pride, in reference to The Little Mermaid. About 25,000 people marched in the 2017 Copenhagen Pride parade, and a further 300,000 people attended and watched the event. In 2018, about 40,000 people took part in the event, with thousands more attending. Among these was Prime Minister Lars Løkke Rasmussen.

Apart from Copenhagen Pride, other LGBTQ events include Aarhus Pride, MIX Copenhagen, a film festival, and the Diversity Party Odense (Mangfoldighedsfest Odense) which was first held in 2017.

== Public opinion ==
A December 2006 European Union member poll by Angus Reid Global Monitor showed Danish support for same-sex marriage at 69%, in third place behind the Netherlands (82%) and Sweden (71%).

According to a 2013 YouGov poll, 59% of respondents thought that same-sex couples should be allowed to adopt children, while 79% believed same-sex couples should be allowed to marry.

The 2015 Eurobarometer found that 87% of Danes thought same-sex marriage should be allowed throughout Europe, 90% thought lesbian, gay and bisexual people should have the same rights as heterosexuals, and 88% agreed that "there is nothing wrong" about a sexual relationship between two people of the same sex. The 2019 Eurobarometer found that 89% of Danes thought same-sex marriage should be allowed throughout Europe, and 90% agreed that "there is nothing wrong in a sexual relationship between two persons of the same sex".

The 2023 Eurobarometer found that 93% of Danes thought same-sex marriage should be allowed throughout Europe, and 93% agreed that "there is nothing wrong in a sexual relationship between two persons of the same sex".

== Timeline ==
=== 17th century ===
- 1668: Nicholas Culpeper and Abdiah Cole publish Thomas Bartholin's Anatomia, a book which briefly mentions lesbianism. Bartholin uses the phrases confricatrices rubster and contemptus vivorum, to describe female homosexuality. He cites historical examples of lesbianism, such as Sappho, Philaenis, and the Book of Romans.
- 1683: The Kingdoms of Denmark and Norway criminalizes "relations against nature", making it punishable by death.

=== 20th century ===
- 1933: Homosexuality in Denmark is decriminalised.
- 1948: Forbundet af 1948 (English: League of 1948), a homosexual group, is formed.
- 1977: Denmark equalizes the age of consent.
- 1985: Forbundet af 1948 becomes the Danish National Association of Gays and Lesbians (Landsforeningen for Bøsser og Lesbiske or LBL).
- 1989: Denmark is the first country in the world to enact registered partnership laws (like a civil union) for same-sex couples, with most of the same rights as marriage (excluding the right of adoption prior to 2010, and the right to marriage in a church); activists Axel and Eigil Axgil and 10 other Danish couples are unofficially married by Tom Ahlberg, the deputy mayor of Copenhagen, in the city hall, accompanied by worldwide media attention.

=== 21st century ===
- 2010: Same-sex couple adoption legislation is passed.
- 2012: Same-sex marriage is passed into law.
- 2014: Denmark becomes the first European country to remove the Gender Identity Disorder diagnosis as a necessary requirement in the gender recognition process.
- 2016: Greenland passes same-sex marriage.
- 2017: Denmark becomes the first country in the world to officially remove transgender identities from its list of mental health disorders. Same-sex marriage is passed in the Faroe Islands.

== Summary table ==
Right	Yes/No	Note
Same-sex sexual activity legal	Yes	Since 1933
Equal age of consent (15)	Yes	Since 1977
Anti-discrimination laws in all areas on sexual orientation and gender identity (including employment, goods and services, etc)	Yes	Since 1996
Laws against hate speech based on sexual orientation	Yes	Since 1987
Laws against hate speech based on gender identity	Yes	Since 2021
Laws against hate crimes based on sexual orientation through an aggravating circumstance	Yes	Since 2004
Laws against hate crimes based on gender identity through an aggravating circumstance	No	
Recognition of same-sex relationships	Yes	Since 1989
Same-sex marriage(s)	Yes	Since 2012
Same-sex civil union(s)	Yes	Since 1989
Stepchild adoption by same-sex couples	Yes	Since 1999
Joint adoption by same-sex couples	Yes	Since 2010
Access to IVF for lesbian couples	Yes	Since 2006
Automatic parenthood for both female spouses	Yes	Since 2013
LGBT people allowed to serve openly in the military	Yes	Since 1978
Right to change legal gender	Yes	Since 1929
Right to change legal gender based on self-determination	Yes	Since 2014
Legal recognition of non-binary gender	Yes	Since 2014
Third gender option	Yes	Since 2014
Transgender identity declassified as an illness	Yes	Since 2017
Conversion therapy banned	No	
Intersex minors protected from invasive surgical procedures	No	
Altruistic surrogacy for same-sex couples	Yes	
MSMs allowed to donate blood	Yes	Since 2024

== See also ==
- Human rights in Denmark
- LGBT Danmark
- LGBT rights in the Faroe Islands
- LGBT rights in Greenland
- LGBT rights in Europe
- LGBT rights in the European Union
- LGBT rights in the Americas
- LGBT rights by country or territory
- Aarhus Pride
- Copenhagen Pride
- Aabenraa Pride
- Nuuk Pride
