= Vennen =

Danish gay men's magazine

- Editor: Helmer Fogedgaard (1949–52); Axel Axgil (1952–55); Martin Elmer (1956–74)
- Categories: homophile, gay men
- Publisher: Forbundet af 1948
- Founded: 1949
- Final issue: 1974
- Country: Denmark
- Language: Danish

Vennen (The Friend) was a Danish magazine for gay men published from 1949 to 1974.

== History ==
In 1948, gay activists Axel and Eigil Axgil founded Denmark's first gay rights organization, Forbundet af 1948 (Association of 1948), now known as LGBT Danmark, in response to the publication of Alfred Kinsey's work Sexual Behavior in the Human Male. Vennen was launched in 1949 as the official magazine for members of the organization; Helmer Fogedgaard was its first editor-in-chief until 1954 when he was replaced by Axel Axgil. Initially, the magazine was available only to members, but in 1951 it became available for sale at newsstands throughout Denmark, Sweden and Norway.

On March 29, 1955, Vennen's Copenhagen offices were raided by police after it became apparent that the magazine was distributing pornographic images of models under the age of 18. Copies of the magazine were seized by police and numerous staff members, including both Axgils and Fogedgaard, were arrested and subsequently sentenced to prison. The event became known as the "Store pornografi-affære" ("Great Porno Affair"). The raid caused a significant loss of credibility to Vennen from within and outside the homophile movement, and was publicly criticized by editors of other European gay men's magazines.

After the 1955 raid, the Forbundet af 1948 disassociated itself from the magazine, but it continued as an independent publication. Journalist Martin Elmer, who had previously written articles and short stories for the magazine, took over the leadership of Vennen in 1956, and was appointed editor-in-chief in 1962. Elmer remained editor-in-chief until the magazine ceased publication in 1974. (Note: Aldrich and Wotherspoon give the year as 1970, but this is likely a misprint.)

== See also ==
- List of magazines in Denmark
- Jens Jersild
