= LGBT Qaamaneq =

LGBT advocacy group in Greenland

LGBT Qaamaneq – Landsforeningen for Bøsser, Lesbiske, Biseksuelle og Transpersoner i Grønland (English: LGBT Qaamaneq – The Greenlandic National Organisation for Gay Men, Lesbians, Bisexuals and Transgender persons) was a lobby group for gay, lesbian, bisexual and transgender people in Greenland.

The association was founded in 2014. It was a revival of an earlier organization, also named Qaamaneq, which had folded due to lack of active participation, resulting from the phenomenon of LGBT Greenlanders often moving to the mainland of Denmark to participate in a larger LGBT community. The original organization, active from 2002 to 2007, had been led by Erik Olsen.

LGBT Qaamaneq's aim is to work for gay, lesbian, bisexual and transgender people's political, social, cultural and workplace equality at every level of society. The association seeks to work against discrimination and to function as a dedicated lobby for the purpose of influencing lawmakers, for example in areas such as marriages, adoption, the artificial insemination of lesbians, and rights for trans people.

The group achieved a notable success when same-sex marriage in Greenland was legalized by the Inatsisartut on May 26, 2015.

== Chairpersons ==
- 2014 – 2015: Tina Egede
- 2015 – 2017: Ivalu Rosing
- 2017 – : Jan Joe Siedsen

== See also ==
- LGBT rights in Greenland
- LGBT rights in Denmark
- LGBT rights in the Americas
- List of LGBT rights organizations
- Nuuk Pride
