= Patrick Spiegelberg =

Danish musical artist

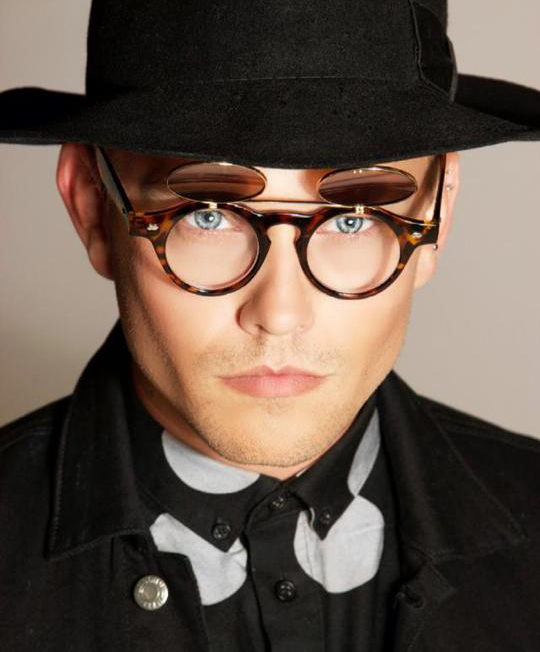
- Photo: Mynte Lagoni

Background information
- Also known as: Glamboy P Patrick Hellegård; Rick Spiegel
- Born: Patrick Bo Spiegelberg Hellegård; 1984 (age 41–42); Copenhagen, Denmark
- Genres: Pop
- Occupations: Singer-songwriter, dancer, choreographer, actor, vocal producer
- Years active: 2003–present
- Label: Slick.Boutique

Patrick Spiegelberg (born in 1984) is a Danish singer, songwriter, dancer, choreographer and vocal producer. He has also performed with the stage name Glamboy P, and has earlier used the names Patrick Hellegård and Rick Spiegel.

== Career ==
During his career, Patrick Spiegelberg has performed in clubs, on TV, in concerts and in musicals, both as a solo singer and for various artists and bands. He started performing at a very young age. In the spring of 2003, he participated in the third season of the Danish reality show Popstars which was sent on TV 2 (Denmark) and TV 2 Zulu. In the competition, he won a place in the new Danish boyband Fu:el which, however, was dissolved the following year.

Patrick Spiegelberg represented Denmark in the Eurovision Dance Contest 2008 in Glasgow, Great Britain, together with Katja Svensson. They ended up as sixth, but won the jury voting. From 2007 to 2010 he worked as a choreographer and dancer for the Danish pop group Infernal during their tours. He has also worked as a dancer and choreograf for Medina (singer) and Alphabeat.

From 2010 to 2012 Patrick was, using the pseudonym Rick Spiegel, one of the front figures of the pop and dance group Fanfare together with Anja Akselbo (artist name Anya Axel). The group released the song "Made in Heaven" and worked as a fixed dance and performance ensemble in Remee's night club ZEN in Copenhagen.

Since 2012 Patrick Spiegelberg has, together with Jonas Worup, arranged the show Kabaret Hemmelig, where many both known and unknown artists have performed, including several Dansk Melodi Grand Prix participants, such as the saxophone player Michael Rune and the singer Danni Elmo.

In 2013 Patrick Spiegelberg co-worked, using his stage name Glamboy P, with the duo Lynx & Pico on their single "Rockin Your Bed", which they also made a music video for.

Patrick Spiegelberg was the assistant judge for the Infernal singer Lina Rafn in the bootcamp of the 7th season of the Danish X Factor. Subsequently, he contributed writing two songs, "Stick Together" and "Lonely Heart", to the Danish X Factor 2014 winners Anthony Jasmin. The group also appears in an advertisement by Telenor, which Patrick has choreographed and directed.

In 2014, Patrick Spiegelberg participated, using the stage name Glamboy P, in Dansk Melodi Grand Prix, shown on DR1. His song "Right By Your Side" was written by the Swedish songwriters Mathias Kallenberger, Andreas Berlin and Jasmine Anderson.

Patrick Spiegelberg has worked as a vocal producer and choreographer for the recording artist Cisilia. He has also worked as a presenter in several events, such as the Danish Pole dance Championships in 2013 and 2014, Copenhagen Pride in 2014 and 2015, Copenhagen Winter Pride in 2015, DM i Strip i 2016, Party like Gatsby in 2016 and the charity event Alle har ret til varmt tøj i 2014. In 2015 Patrick Spiegelberg worked as a creative director at the night club Klosteret in Copenhagen and from 2016 onwards he has worked as a responsible for the event bureau StandOutCrowd, which arranges different show productions.

The song "Dig og mig mod verden", which Patrick Spiegelberg has written with Engelina, was chosen as the Pride song for Copenhagen Pride 2015.

=== Musicals ===
Year	Musical	Theater
2007–2008	Chicago	Det Ny Teater
2008	Matador	Operaen
2012	Stupid man	Bellevue Teatret

=== TV appearances (Denmark) ===
Year	Channel	TV show	Details
2003	TV 2 (Denmark)	Popstars	Fu:el
2003	DR	Junior Eurovision Song Contest	Fu:el as an opening performance
2006	Kanal 5 (Denmark)	Kan du danse?	dancer
2008	DR	Eurovision Dance Contest 2008	participant, representing Denmark
2009	DR1	Dansk Melodi Grand Prix	dancer for Trine Jepsen
2010	TV 2 (Denmark)	De fede trin	dancer
2010	TV 2 (Denmark)	De største øjeblikke	Fanfare
2010	TV 2 (Denmark)	Året der gik	Fanfare
2011	TV3+	Danmark om natten	Fanfare
2014	DR1	X Factor	assistant judge to bootcamp in 2 episodes
2014	DR1	Dansk Melodi Grand Prix	participant
2014	DR2	Søndag live	talk show guest
2014	DR3	Langt ude	talk show guest in 6 episodes
2015	DR1	Aftenshowet	talk show guest
2015	DR3	Pornoquizzen	game show guest

== Discography ==
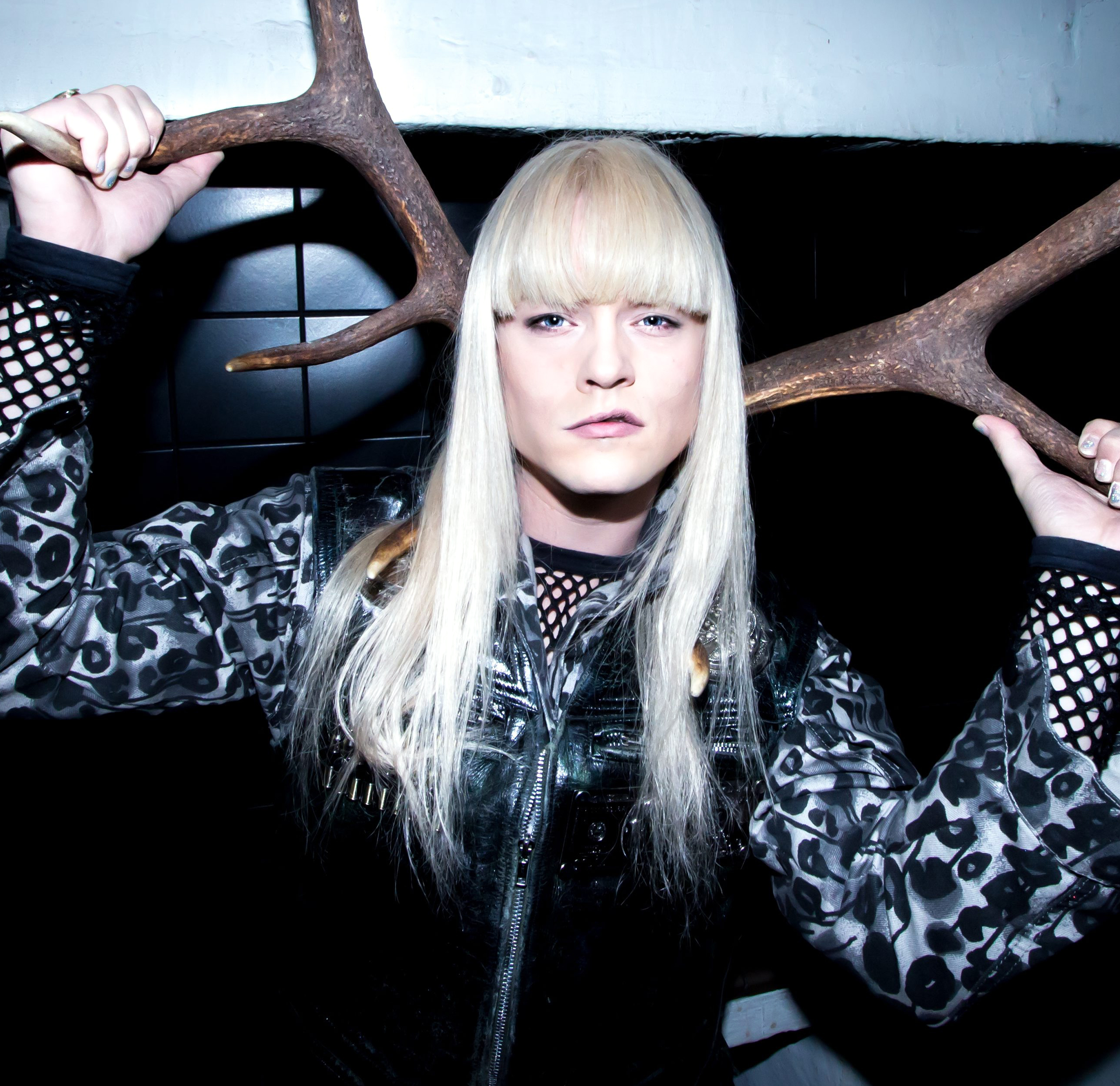
Glamboy P in February 2014. Photo: Martin Dan Olsen

=== Singles ===
- 2003: "Please Please" (Fu:el)
- 2003: "Next Summer" (Fu:el)
- 2008: "That Kind of Punk" (Patrick Spiegelberg)
- 2009: "Jeg Er Også en Perle" (Perlekæden)
- 2010: "Die on the Disco" (Patrick Spiegelberg)
- 2011: "Made in Heaven" (Fanfare)
- 2012: "Whatever It Takes" (Stokk, Preben & Pøllemand feat. Patrick Spiegelberg)
- 2013: "Rockin Your Bed" (Lynx & Pico feat. Glamboy P)
- 2014: "Right By Your Side" (Glamboy P)
- 2015: "Dig Og Mig Mod Verden" (Patrick Spiegelberg)

=== Albums ===
- 2003: "Next, Please" (Fu:el)

=== Other appearances ===
- 2010: "Open Air (Intro Mix)" (Vendelboe feat. Patrick Spiegelberg) – from the compilation album The Sound of IN Volume 9
- 2014: "Right By Your Side (Karaoke Version)" – from the compilation album Dansk Melodi Grand Prix 2014

=== DVDs ===
- 2009: "Electric Cabaret" (Infernal) – dancer and choreographer
