= Jens Jersild =

Danish law-enforcement officer and author (1903–1978)

- Born: 1903
- Died: 1978 (aged 74–75)
- Citizenship: Danish
- Occupations: Police inspector, author
- Years active: 1951–1971
- Organization: Copenhagen Morality Police
- Known for: Anti-homosexual activism
- Notable work: Boy Prostitution (1956) Pedophiles: Child Lovers (1964)

Jens Jersild (1903–1978) was a Danish law-enforcement officer and author who, as the chief of Copenhagen's Morality Police, persecuted homosexuals under his position from 1951 until his retirement in 1971. He was known as one of the most prominent anti-gay figures of his time.

Jersild's raid of gay magazine Vennen in 1955 catalyzed what would later be known as the "pornography affair" (Pornografiaffæren), which culminated with multiple Danish gay men dying by suicide and LGBT+ Danmark losing nearly all of its members.

A prominent voice in Danish popular discourse, Jersild gave lectures and made multiple media appearances as an expert on the topic of sexual crimes across the country. His book Pedophiles: Child Lovers (1964) was an early introducer of the word "pedophile" into Danish public discourse. He is also the author of Boy Prostitution (1956). Jersild was an advisor in the production of crime movie Bundfald (1957), as well as other films.
