= Fu:el =

Danish boy band

- Origin: Copenhagen, Denmark
- Genres: Pop
- Years active: 2003–2004
- Labels: EMI
- Past members: Lars Thomsen; Theis Keller; Patrick Hellegård; Tarik Bakir; Martin Bunk

Fu:el was a Danish boy band consisting of the members Lars Thomsen, Theis Keller, Patrick Hellegård, Tarik Bakir and Martin Bunk. They became known as participants of the third season of the reality show Popstars in the spring of 2003, where the goal was to form a new Danish boyband.

The group had a recording contract with EMI for which they released the single "Please, Please". The single reached number one on the Danish singles charts (Hitlisten). The single was followed by the group's debut album Next, Please in September 2003, but it went on to sell only 5.000 copies and received appalling reviews with only 1 out of 6 stars in the music magazine GAFFA.

== Discography ==
=== Albums ===
- 2003: Next, Please

=== Singles ===
- 2003: "Please Please" (#1 on Hitlisten)
- 2003: "Next Summer"
