= Denmark in the Eurovision Song Contest 2014 =

- Eurovision Song Contest 2014
- Participating broadcaster: Danmarks Radio (DR)
- Country: Denmark
- Selection process: Dansk Melodi Grand Prix 2014
- Selection date: 8 March 2014

Competing entry
- Song: "Cliche Love Song"
- Artist: Basim
- Songwriters: Lasse Lindorff; Kim Nowak-Zorde; Daniel Fält; Basim

Placement
- Final result: 9th, 74 points

Participation chronology

Denmark was represented at the Eurovision Song Contest 2014 with the song "Cliche Love Song", written by Lasse Lindorff, Kim Nowak-Zorde, Daniel Fält, and Basim, and performed by Basim himself. The Danish participating broadcaster, Danmarks Radio (DR), organised the national final Dansk Melodi Grand Prix 2014 in order to select its entry for the contest. In addition, DR was also the host broadcaster and staged the event at B&W Hallerne in Copenhagen, after winning the previous edition with the song "Only Teardrops" by Emmelie de Forest. Ten songs competed in a televised national final where "Cliche Love Song" performed by Basim was the winner as decided upon through the combination of jury voting and public voting over two rounds.

As the host country, Denmark qualified to compete directly in the final of the Eurovision Song Contest. Denmark's running order position was determined by draw. Performing in position 23 during the final, Denmark placed ninth out of the 26 participating countries with 74 points.

== Background ==
Prior to the 2014 contest, Danmarks Radio (DR) had participated in the Eurovision Song Contest representing Denmark forty-two times since its first entry in 1957. It had won the contest, to this point, on three occasions: in 1963 with the song "Dansevise" performed by Grethe and Jørgen Ingmann, in 2000 with the song "Fly on the Wings of Love" performed by Olsen Brothers, and in 2013 with the song "Only Teardrops" performed by Emmelie de Forest.

As part of its duties as participating broadcaster, DR organises the selection of its entry in the Eurovision Song Contest and broadcasts the event in the country. The broadcaster has selected all of its Eurovision entries through the national final Dansk Melodi Grand Prix. DR organised Dansk Melodi Grand Prix 2014 in order to select its entry for the 2014 contest.

== Before Eurovision ==
=== Dansk Melodi Grand Prix 2014 ===
Dansk Melodi Grand Prix 2014 was the 44th edition of Dansk Melodi Grand Prix, the music competition organised by DR to select its entries for the Eurovision Song Contest. The event was held on 8 March 2014 at the Arena Fyn in Odense, hosted by Louise Wolff and Jacob Riising and televised on DR1 as well as streamed online at the official DR website. The national final was watched by 1.785 million viewers in Denmark.

==== Format ====
Ten songs competed in one show where the winner was determined over two rounds of voting. In the first round, the top three songs based on the combination of votes from a public vote and a five-member jury panel qualified to the superfinal. In the superfinal, the winner was determined again by the votes of the jury and public. Viewers were able to vote via SMS. In addition to selecting the Danish Eurovision entry, the songwriters responsible for the winning song were awarded a monetary prize of 100,000 Danish kroner by the Danish songwriting association KODA.

The five-member jury panel was composed of:

- Søs Fenger – singer-songwriter
- Lars Pedersen (Chief 1) – DJ, singer and music producer
- Camille Jones – singer-songwriter and producer
- Jørgen de Mylius – television and radio host, 23-times Danish Eurovision Song Contest commentator
- Mich Hedin Hansen (Cutfather) – songwriter and music producer

==== Competing entries ====
DR opened a submission period between 20 August 2013 and 7 October 2013 for artists and composers to submit their entries. The broadcaster received a record breaking 872 entries during the submission period; the previous record was set in 2013 when the broadcaster received 692 entries. A selection committee selected six songs from the entries submitted to the broadcaster, while four of the participants were invited to compete based on editorial considerations. The competing artists and songs were announced on 28 January 2014, while DR held a press meet and greet on 28 January 2014 where the entries were officially presented.

Artist	Song	Songwriter(s)	Selection
Anna David	"It Hurts"	Anna David, Lasse Lindorff, Kim Nowak-Zorde, Jeremy Huffleman, Marli Harwood, Michael Harwood, Nick Keynes	Invited by DR
Basim	"Cliche Love Song"	Lasse Lindorff, Kim Nowak-Zorde, Daniel Fält, Basim	Open submission
Bryan Rice	"I Choose U"	Bryan Rice, Lars Halvor Jensen, Johannes Jørgensen, Shanna Crooks	Open submission
Danni Elmo	"She's the One"	Engelina, Alexander Brown, Søren Vestergaard, Marcus Linnet	Open submission
Emilie Moldow	"Vi finder hjem"	Engelina, Ole Brodersen, Kasper Larsen, Basim	Open submission
Glamboy P	"Right By Your Side"	Mathias Kallenberger, Andreas Berlin, Jasmine Anderson	Open submission
Michael Rune feat. Natascha Bessez	"Wanna Be Loved"	Lars Halvor Jensen, Martin Michael Larsson, Luke Madden, Lemar Obika	Invited by DR
Nadia Malm	"Before You Forget Me"	Nadia Malm Hansen	Invited by DR
Rebekka Thornbech	"Your Lies"	Danne Attlerud, Gustav Eurén, Niclas Arn	Open submission
Sonny Pedersen	"Feeling the You"	Sonny Fredie-Pedersen, Frederik Tao Nordsøe Schjoldan, Thomas Lumpkins	Invited by DR

==== Final ====
The final took place on 8 March 2014. In the first round of voting the top three advanced to the superfinal based on the votes of a five-member jury (50%) and a public televote (50%). In the superfinal, the winner, "Cliche Love Song" performed by Basim, was selected by the public and jury vote. The viewers and the juries each had a total of 30 points to award in the superfinal. Each juror distributed their points as follows: 1, 2 and 3 points. The viewer vote was based on the percentage of votes each song achieved. For example, if a song gained 10% of the viewer vote, then that entry would be awarded 10% of 30 points rounded to the nearest integer: 3 points.

In addition to the performances of the competing entries, Emmelie de Forest, Kirsten and Søren (who represented Denmark in 1984, 1985, and 1988), Birthe Kjær (who represented Denmark in 1989), and Rollo and King (who represented Denmark in 2001) performed as the interval acts.

Final – 8 March 2014
R/O	Artist	Song	Result
1	Bryan Rice	"I Choose U"	—N/a
2	Rebekka Thornbech	"Your Lies"	Advanced
3	Sonny Pedersen	"Feeling the You"	—N/a
4	Danni Elmo	"She's the One"	—N/a
5	Emilie Moldow	"Vi finder hjem"	—N/a
6	Glamboy P	"Right By Your Side"	—N/a
7	Nadia Malm	"Before You Forget Me"	—N/a
8	Basim	"Cliche Love Song"	Advanced
9	Anna David	"It Hurts"	—N/a
10	Michael Rune feat. Natascha Bessez	"Wanna Be Loved"	Advanced

Superfinal – 8 March 2014
R/O	Artist	Song	Jury	Televote	Total	Place							
R/O	Artist	Song	Jury	Televote	Total	Place	1	Basim	"Cliche Love Song"	15	15	30	1
2	Michael Rune feat. Natascha Bessez	"Wanna Be Loved"	7	8	15	2							
3	Rebekka Thornbech	"Your Lies"	8	7	15	3							

Detailed Jury Votes
R/O	Song	S. Fenger	Chief 1	C. Jones	J. de Mylius	Cutfather	Total
1	"Cliche Love Song"	3	3	3	3	3	15
2	"Wanna Be Loved"	1	1	1	2	2	7
3	"Your Lies"	2	2	2	1	1	8

=== Promotion ===
Basim specifically promoted "Cliche Love Song" as the Danish Eurovision entry on 5 April 2014 by performing during the Eurovision in Concert event which was held at the Melkweg venue in Amsterdam, Netherlands and hosted by Cornald Maas and Sandra Reemer.

== At Eurovision ==
Basim presenting himself and "Cliche Love Song" at the Eurovision Song Contest 2014

All countries except the "Big Five" (France, Germany, Italy, Spain and the United Kingdom) and the host country, are required to qualify from one of two semi-finals in order to compete for the final; the top ten countries from each semi-final progress to the final. As the host country, Denmark automatically qualified to compete in the final on 10 May 2014. In addition to their participation in the final, Denmark is also required to broadcast and vote in one of the two semi-finals. During the semi-final allocation draw on 20 January 2014, Denmark was assigned to broadcast and vote in the first semi-final on 6 May 2014.

The two semi-finals and final were broadcast on DR1 with commentary by Anders Bisgaard, who replaced Ole Tøpholm due to Tøpholm being ill. Bisgaard also commentated the broadcast of the final via radio on DR P4. The final was also broadcast on DR3 with commentary by Peter Falktoft and Esben Bjerre Hansen, and on DR Ramasjang with interpretation in International Sign for the deaf and sign language users. DR appointed Sofie Lassen-Kahlke as its spokesperson to announce the Danish votes during the final.

=== Final ===
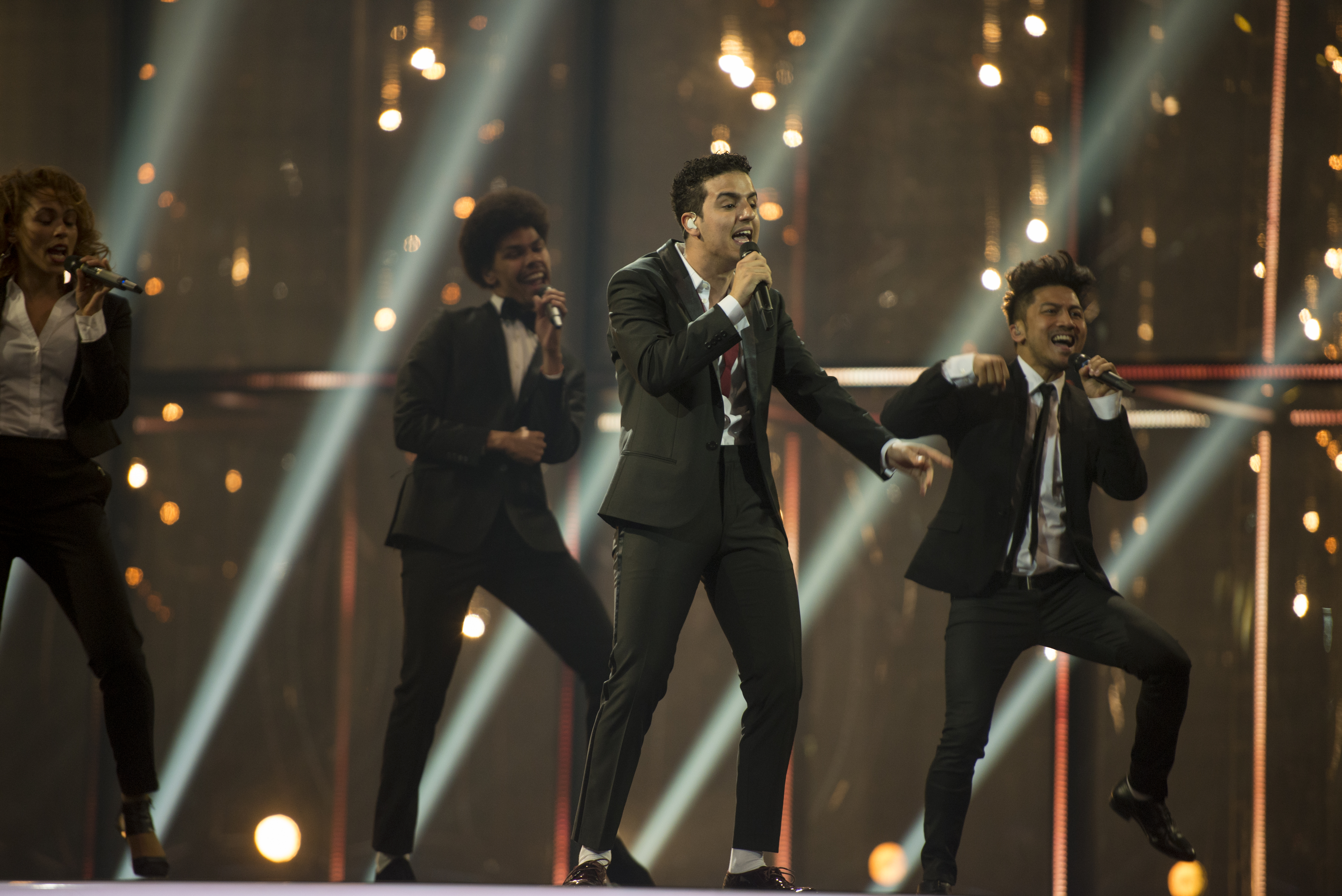
Basim during a rehearsal before the final

Basim took part in technical rehearsals on 4 and 6 May, followed by dress rehearsals on 9 and 10 May. This included the jury final on 9 May where the professional juries of each country watched and voted on the competing entries. As the host nation, Denmark's running order position in the final was decided through a random draw that took place during the Heads of Delegation meeting in Copenhagen on 17 March 2014. Denmark was drawn to perform in position 23. Following the second semi-final, the shows' producers decided upon the running order of the final rather than through another draw, so that similar songs were not placed next to each other. While Denmark had already been drawn to perform in position 23, it was determined that Denmark would perform following Malta and before the entry from the Netherlands.

The Danish performance featured Basim dressed in a black suit and performing a choreographed routine with two dancers and three backing vocalists. The stage colours were predominantly red, orange and white and the LED screens displayed flashing strobe lights. A banner which contained the text "LOVE" was also released at the conclusion of the performance. The two dancers that joined Basim were Tobias Ellehammer and Ivan Spahi, while the three backing vocalists were: Ayoe Angelica, Andy Roda and Marcel Gbekle. Denmark placed ninth in the final, scoring 94 points.

=== Voting ===
Voting during the three shows consisted of 50 percent public televoting and 50 percent from a jury deliberation. The jury consisted of five music industry professionals who were citizens of the country they represent, with their names published before the contest to ensure transparency. This jury was asked to judge each contestant based on: vocal capacity; the stage performance; the song's composition and originality; and the overall impression by the act. In addition, no member of a national jury could be related in any way to any of the competing acts in such a way that they cannot vote impartially and independently. The individual rankings of each jury member were released shortly after the grand final.

Following the release of the full split voting by the EBU after the conclusion of the competition, it was revealed that Denmark had placed thirteenth with the public televote and tenth with the jury vote in the final. In the public vote, Denmark scored 43 points, while with the jury vote, Denmark scored 85 points.

Below is a breakdown of points awarded to Denmark and awarded by Denmark in the first semi-final and grand final of the contest, and the breakdown of the jury voting and televoting conducted during the two shows:

==== Points awarded to Denmark ====
Points awarded to Denmark (Final)
Score	Country
12 points	
10 points	
8 points	Germany; Iceland; Sweden
7 points	
6 points	Belgium; Finland; Poland; Slovenia
5 points	Portugal
4 points	Romania
3 points	France; Spain; Switzerland; United Kingdom
2 points	
1 point	Armenia; Lithuania; Netherlands; Norway; San Marino

==== Points awarded by Denmark ====
Points awarded by Denmark (Semi-final 1)
Score	Country
12 points	Netherlands
10 points	Sweden
8 points	Iceland
7 points	Ukraine
6 points	Hungary
5 points	Armenia
4 points	Russia
3 points	Portugal
2 points	Albania
1 point	Latvia

Points awarded by Denmark (Final)
Score	Country
12 points	Sweden
10 points	Netherlands
8 points	Austria
7 points	United Kingdom
6 points	Norway
5 points	Iceland
4 points	Finland
3 points	Hungary
2 points	Armenia
1 point	Ukraine

==== Detailed voting results ====
The following members comprised the Danish jury:

- Lise Cabble (jury chairperson) – songwriter, singer, composer of the 1995, 2011 and 2013 Danish contest entries "Fra Mols til Skagen", "New Tomorrow" and "Only Teardrops"
- Rune Funch – guitarist, film composer
- Monique Spartalis – singer
- Mich Hedin Hansen (Cutfather) – music producer, songwriter
- Sys Bjerre – singer

Detailed voting results from Denmark (Semi-final 1)
R/O	Country	L. Cabble	R. Funch	M. Spartalis	Cutfather	S. Bjerre	Jury Rank	Televote Rank	Combined Rank	Points
01	Armenia	10	2	9	2	12	5	9	6	5
02	Latvia	15	7	13	13	11	14	7	10	1
03	Estonia	3	16	11	11	15	13	13	13	
04	Sweden	1	1	1	1	1	1	2	2	10
05	Iceland	6	6	12	9	4	6	4	3	8
06	Albania	13	9	7	15	3	9	8	9	2
07	Russia	4	4	4	4	7	3	11	7	4
08	Azerbaijan	12	5	10	3	8	7	14	12	
09	Ukraine	9	12	3	5	5	4	6	4	7
10	Belgium	8	13	5	12	16	12	15	15	
11	Moldova	16	14	16	14	14	16	16	16	
12	San Marino	11	8	14	16	10	15	12	14	
13	Portugal	5	11	15	8	9	10	5	8	3
14	Netherlands	2	3	2	6	6	2	1	1	12
15	Montenegro	14	10	8	7	13	11	10	11	
16	Hungary	7	15	6	10	2	8	3	5	6

Detailed voting results from Denmark (Final)
R/O	Country	L. Cabble	R. Funch	M. Spartalis	Cutfather	S. Bjerre	Jury Rank	Televote Rank	Combined Rank	Points
01	Ukraine	14	12	4	17	7	9	15	10	1
02	Belarus	20	21	18	24	12	21	17	21	
03	Azerbaijan	8	8	17	6	19	10	24	19	
04	Iceland	10	10	24	11	4	11	4	6	5
05	Norway	2	6	9	12	9	6	7	5	6
06	Romania	17	19	14	8	15	14	19	18	
07	Armenia	13	5	7	4	20	8	14	9	2
08	Montenegro	25	17	19	19	14	20	23	23	
09	Poland	15	7	22	15	25	18	10	15	
10	Greece	11	23	16	9	22	16	11	13	
11	Austria	4	1	2	2	2	2	3	3	8
12	Germany	22	16	8	10	11	13	13	12	
13	Sweden	1	2	1	1	1	1	2	1	12
14	France	9	22	12	18	21	17	18	20	
15	Russia	6	3	5	7	6	4	21	11	
16	Italy	21	25	25	22	18	25	25	25	
17	Slovenia	16	24	15	23	23	23	20	22	
18	Finland	7	13	6	16	5	7	8	7	4
19	Spain	18	18	20	13	17	19	12	16	
20	Switzerland	23	15	21	25	16	22	6	14	
21	Hungary	12	20	10	14	8	12	9	8	3
22	Malta	19	14	11	20	13	15	16	17	
23	Denmark									
24	Netherlands	3	4	3	3	10	3	1	2	10
25	San Marino	24	9	23	21	24	24	22	24	
26	United Kingdom	5	11	13	5	3	5	5	4	7
