= Alex Palmieri =

Italian singer-songwriter (born 1991)

- Alex Palmieri in 2026

Background information
- Born: Alessandro Palmieri; 12 January 1991 (age 35); Milan, Italy
- Genre: Pop
- Occupations: Singer-songwriter; pornographic actor
- Years active: 2010–present
- Labels: ItalianWayMusic; Believe Digital
- Website: alexpalmieriofficial.com

Alessandro "Alex" Palmieri (born 12 January 1991) is an Italian singer-songwriter, gay pornographic film actor and Grabby Award winner.

He reached media popularity as a result of his internet presence and television appearances. During his music career, he released 1 Ep, 3 albums and 20 singles. Since 2021 Palmieri has been a content creator on Onlyfans and he took part in several pornographic films produced by Falcon Entertainment, Raging Stallion Studios and Men.com. In 2026 he won a Grabby Award for Scene of the Year.

== Biography ==
Palmieri has studied dance since he was six, and he appeared for the first time on TV in 2010 during Pomeriggio Cinque, a TV show with Barbara D'Urso on Canale 5. In 2011, his first single Move was released. He reached fame and media renown thanks to his performances in several discos, TV appearances (including an interview on La3) TV and online activities. In 2011 he took part in the second edition of the Social King reality show on Rai 2, classifying himself among the four final contenders. During the running period of this TV show, the single Popstar was released thanks to the cooperation with the Swedish DJ Tim Bergholm. Later, during the promotional tour, he also presented the song on Match Music TV.

After having released other singles and after several performances in Italian discos, Palmieri released the single Monster Boy at the end of 2012, produced by Ukrainian Jandy Andrey Prudnikov and in 2013 he performed at gay pride in Milan. This song was also broadcast on the Italian TV network Sky Sport during the program Calcio Mercato presented by Alessandro Bonan. In autumn of that year he signed his first record deal with Believe Digital and he published the album Back Alive, co-produced by Bergholm and Prudnikov and anticipated by the first single Wasted. Later, Palmieri performed on tour around Italy in clubs and as a guest at events related to gay prides. Moreover, he published other singles from the album, always followed by music videos.

In November 2014 he published the first single from his new album, Maniac. This was the video that opened the singer's official Vevo channel and in 2015 he performed during the Verona Pride supporting Ivana Spagna and Power Francers. In November 2015 the album Uncensored was released, it was produced by Believe Digital. The single Nicholas' Got a Secret came out before the album and was produced by Palmieri and Prudnikov with the participation of Luca Sala. The tour that followed was the first one with dates around Europe, for instance during Regenbogenparade in Vienna, at CSD München, at Warsaw Pride and at Copenhagen Pride. Simultaneously to the European tour, two singles were extracted from the album: Single and Save Me.

In September 2016, Palmieri was one of the love interests in the dating game show Uomini e donne on Canale 5 during the first gay edition, where he stayed for one month, in the same period he renewed his contract with Believe Digital and in November he released the single Online. This song was broadcast in preview on Swiss TV RSI La 2. In 2017, the videoclip of ″Online″ was broadcast in airplay on TV channels OutTV in Belgium and in the Netherlands. Afterwards, the national tour aimed at the promotion of the song, starting from Cagliari and continuing in several other Italian cities. In summer 2017 the tour continued in Europe with three dates in Germany (Konstanz, Mannheim e Düsseldorf), followed by Florence, Budapest and London, marking the singer's first time in the UK: the performance in Trafalgar Square was part of the London Pride, supporting Fleur East gig and where the singer was also interviewed by London Live. Concurrently with the live shows, Palmieri confirmed the making of a new album and in October 2017 the first single But Nobody Knows for the forthcoming album was released. The song was produced between Italy and California by the producer Johann Bach and in November the news agency Adnkronos published the videoclip première.

In January 2018, Alex Palmieri released his second album with Believe Digital entitled Reset, an electro-pop work inspired by the sound of the 2000s and for which, once again, Palmieri wrote all the lyrics. The album included the previous single Online and But Nobody Knows and it's been recorded in Italy, Ukraine, Sweden and California, with the help of Alex's fans, who helped to raise money for the production thanks to a Crowdfunding campaign. The release of the album was accompanied by the third single Time Resetted (produced together with Alex Zitelli and Livio Boccioni) and followed by a few TV appearances: the singer presented the album on TG Norba 24, on the Swiss channel RSI La 2 and on Rai 1, on the television programme Unomattina. In March, during an interview on Radio 105 Network, where Palmieri announces the first Italian dates of the Reset Tour. In summer 2018, live shows have been extended in Europe with gigs in Germany, Poland and Spain and in September a 4th single from Reset was released, the song against bullying If That Was You. The ballad gathered a positive media attention: in October it was premiered on the Rai 1 TV programme Storie italiane ("Italian Stories"), hosted by Eleonora Daniele and later on, the channel Rete 4 broadcast a sneak preview of the music video. In January 2019, Palmieri released the last single from Reset, the dance/pop track In the Backstage which he performed on TV, on Rai 1 on the programme Unomattina. and in February he announced a reprise of the Reset Tour with other 7 Italian dates. That summer the Reset Tour went back in Europe, with its conclusive dates in Germany (Munich and Hamburg), Czech Republic (Prague) and Austria where Alex was the only Italian singer to take the stage of EuroPride 2019 in Wien. In the meantime, he confirmed the processing of a new music project and in December, during an interview on TG Norba 24 Palmieri announces the release date of the new album Wrong in 2020.

In January 2020 the new album Wrong came out, it was preceded by the first single Fake News (which had come out the previous October). The album which was worked on in Italy, Ukraine, California and the Philippines, is pop with elements of trap and K-pop. It was described by the singer as "less commercial and more personal than previous discographic work". It was presented on Rai 1 TV programme Storie Italiane (Italian Stories) hosted by Eleonora Daniele, who showed a sneak preview from the videoclip of the second single Room 05. After the music video release, Alex disclosed the Wrong Tour dates starting from Munchen, but after the first one, many stages have been cancelled due to COVID-19 plague. During the quarantine he was interviewed by Radio Rai and Rai 3 and in September the third single, the ballad Beatrice from the album Wrong, was released. This single is dedicated to women and female emancipation and it'll be on radio airplay on BBC Radio in UK in autumn. In October Alex is interviewed by TG3 on Rai 3 and Rai 1 in the program Unomattina, both broadcasting a preview of Beatrice music video, which was released in November for ANSA (Agenzia Nazionale Stampa Associata). In December, Palmieri made his debut in Albania with several television appearances, which included interviews on RTSH and on Televizioni Klan, as well as a 10-minute live performance on Christmas night. In 2021 Palmieri released the 4th single from Wrong called Dangerous Scandalous, which received a positive response in Albania with interviews and previews on Televizioni Klan and MTV Albania. In March 2021, it was selected for the television festival Kënga Magjike, but In May the singer announced a break from music.

In spring of 2021, Palmieri became one of the first Italian television personalities to open an onlyfans page, becoming one of the most paid and followed accounts in his country.

In 2023 he began a contract with Falcon Studios and he took part in his first studio pornographic film - “Global Entry : Sicily”.

In 2024, the movie won at the “Grabby Europe” as best movie of the year, in the same year Alex took part at the movies “Global Entry: Portugual “from Falcon Studios and “Oversized”.

In November 2024, Palmieri was interviewed by Vanity Fair Italy in which he discussed his private life, porn career, and his past life has a singer. The interview resulted in significant media attention within Italy.

In 2025, Palmieri appeared in several productions for NakedSword and Falcon Studios, including The Whole Package and Spain in the Ass. He also appeared in Alpha Builders for Men.com and Ready to Fly for Men At Play Studios.

In January 2026, Palmieri received seven nominations at the Grabby Awards. In April 2026, he won the Grabby Award for Best Scene for Spain in the Ass.

After a five-year hiatus from music, Palmieri released the single Pay to Play in May 2026. During the summer of 2026, he promoted the single through a live tour in Italy.

Later in 2026, two additional productions for Men At Play Studios were released. He also appeared in The Shaft Shack, produced by Raging Stallion Studios.

== Discography ==
=== Albums ===
- Back Alive (EP - 2013, Believe Digital)
- Uncensored (2015, Believe Digital)
- Reset (2018, Believe Digital)
- Wrong (2020, Believe Digital)

=== Singles ===
- "Move" (2011)
- "Popstar" (2011)
- "Touch Me" (2012)
- "Monster Boy" (2012)
- "Wasted" (2013)
- "Back Alive" (2013)
- "Lovekiller" (2014)
- "Maniac" (2014)
- "Nicholas’ Got a Secret" (2015)
- "Single" (2015)
- "Save Me" (2016)
- "Online" (2016)
- "But Nobody Knows" (2017)
- "Time Resetted" (2018)
- "If That Was You" (2018)
- "In the Backstage" (2019)
- "Fake News" (2019)
- "Room 05" (2020)
- "Beatrice" (2020)
- "Dangerous Scandalous" (2021)
- "Pay To Play" (2026)

== Filmography ==
- Global entry: Sicily ( Naked Sword / Falcon studios ) 2023

- Magic Porfume (Real Gay Vr) 2024

- Global Entry: Portugal (Naked sword / Falcon Studios) 2024

- Oversized ( Regin Stallion Studios / Falcon Studios) 2024

- Alpha builders (Men.com) 2025

- Ready To Fly (Men at Play) 2025

- Spain in The *SS (Naked Sword ) 2025

- The Whole Package (Falcon Studios) 2025
