= Natascha Bessez =

American singer

- Born: 20 December 1986 (age 39)
- Genres: Europop; Eurodance; progressive house; dance-pop
- Occupations: Singer; dancer
- Instrument: Vocals
- Years active: 2007–present

Natascha Bessez is an American singer and beauty pageant titleholder. She competed in the Dansk Melodi Grand Prix 2014 and on The Bachelor Presents: Listen to Your Heart in 2020.

== Early life ==
Bessez has a Chilean mother and a father of French descent.

== Career ==
=== Pageantry ===
Natascha Bessez

Bessez was named Miss New York Teen USA 2005.

=== Music career ===
In 2007, Bessez was chosen to compete in the reality music competition on CW 11's Pussycat Dolls Present: The Search for the Next Doll. After making it to the top 18, she then competed in the group audition round, where she performed, "I Don't Need a Man" by The Pussycat Dolls along with Anjelia, Chelsea, Jasmin, Anastacia, and Robyn, but was eliminated.

In 2014, Bessez competed in the Eurovision Song Contest Prelim's, Dansk Melodi Grand Prix 2014 with the song "Wanna Be Loved" along with Danish saxophonist Michael Rune. In the final held on 8 March 2014 in Odense, the duo performed tenth and made it into the superfinal after placing in the top three. In the superfinal, they received 7 points from the jury and 8 from the public vote, ending them up in a dual second place with Rebekka Thornbech and her song "Your Lies", behind the winner Basim and his song "Cliche Love Song". "Wanna Be Loved" represented Denmark in the OGAE Second Chance Contest 2014, a contest where each country's OGAE fanclub selects a song to represent them that didn't win their country's national selection. It placed fifth out of twenty competing songs.

In 2018, she auditioned for The Voice of Holland, performing “Finesse” by Bruno Mars and Cardi B.

In 2020, she competed on The Bachelor Presents: Listen to Your Heart and was eliminated in week five of the competition.

== Personal life ==
In 2018, after meeting a Dutchman while living in New York City, she moved together with him to the town of Vlaardingen.

== Filmography ==
| Year | Title | Role | Notes |
|---|---|---|---|
| 2007 | Pussycat Dolls Present: The Search for the Next Doll | Herself; contestant | |
| 2008 | Lipstick Jungle | Waitress | Episode: "Chapter Six: Take the High Road" |
| 2008 | Gossip Girl | Cocktail Waitress | Episode: "All About My Brother" |
| 2008 | Sex and the City | Patron | Uncredited |
| 2009 | Confessions of a Shopaholic | Wedding Guest | Uncredited |
| 2009 | Royal Pains | Party Guest | Episode: "Nobody's Perfect" |
| 2014 | Dansk Melodi Grand Prix 2014 | Herself; contestant | With Michael Rune |
| 2018–2019 | The Voice of Holland | Herself; contestant | Season 9; eliminated in battle rounds |
| 2020 | The Bachelor Presents: Listen to Your Heart | Herself; contestant | Eliminated in week 5 |
