= The Bachelor Presents: Listen to Your Heart =

American dating reality TV series

- Genre: Dating game show; Reality
- Created by: Mike Fleiss
- Presented by: Chris Harrison
- Country of origin: United States
- Original language: English
- No. of seasons: 1
- No. of episodes: 6

Production
- Executive producers: Mike Fleiss; Martin Hilton; Nicole Woods; Bennett Graebner; Peter Gust; Tim Warner; Louis Caric; Peter Geist
- Running time: 2:00:00
- Production companies: Next Entertainment; Warner Horizon Television

Original release
- Network: ABC
- Release: April 13 – May 18, 2020

Related
- The Bachelor franchise

The Bachelor Presents: Listen to Your Heart is an American dating reality television series created by Mike Fleiss for ABC. It is a spin-off of The Bachelor and is hosted by Chris Harrison. The series is produced by Next Entertainment in association with Warner Horizon Television, with Fleiss, Martin Hilton, Nicole Woods, Bennett Graebner, Peter Gust, Tim Warner, Louis Caric, and Peter Geist serving as executive producers.

== Format ==
The series follows single men and women, who are musicians or work in the music industry, hoping to find love through music. The contestants will sing well-known songs, both individually and as couples, and explore their relationships while living together and going on Bachelor-style dates that focus on music.

== Contestants ==
The 23 contestants were revealed on February 27, 2020.

Color key:

Female contestant
Male contestant

Contestant	Age	Residence	Music genre	Arrival	Status	Ref.
Bri Stauss	28	Provo, Utah	Pop	Week 1	Winners	
Chris Watson	30	Los Angeles, California	Soul	Week 1	Winners	
Jamie Weintraub	21	Nashville, Tennessee	Country	Week 1	Runners-Up	
Trevor Holmes	29	Encino, California	Country pop	Week 1	Runners-Up	
Rudi Gutierrez	24	Los Angeles, California	R&B and pop	Week 1	Quit (Week 6)	
Matt Ranaudo	32	Encino, California	Neo soul	Week 1	Quit (Week 6)	
Natascha Bessez	33	Los Angeles, California	Pop	Week 2	Eliminated (Week 5)	
Ryan Neal	28	Dearborn Heights, Michigan	Jazz, funk, pop and R&B	Week 1	Eliminated (Week 5)	
Julia Rae	27	Wayne, Pennsylvania	Pop	Week 1	Eliminated (Week 4)	
Brandon Mills	34	Nashville, Tennessee	American folk-pop	Week 1	Eliminated (Week 4)	
Savannah McKinley	25	Nashville, Tennessee	Acoustic pop	Week 1	Quit (Week 4)	
Sheridan Reed	27	Austin, Texas	R&B soul pop	Week 1	Quit (Week 4)	
Bekah Purifoy	25	Washington, D.C.	Musical theatre	Week 1	Eliminated (Week 3)	
Danny Padilla	26	Sherman Oaks, California	Singer-songwriter	Week 1	Eliminated (Week 3)	
Ruby Jane Smith	25	Austin, Texas	Indie pop	Week 2	Eliminated (Week 3)	
Gabe Baker	28	Houston, Texas	Soul/folk	Week 1	Quit (Week 3)	
Cheyenne Arnell	23	Lawndale, California	R&B	Week 1	Eliminated (Week 2)	
Mariana Jasel	23	Dallas, Texas	R&B and pop	Week 2	Eliminated (Week 2)	
Mel Taevin	27	Brooklyn, New York	Indie rock	Week 1	Eliminated (Week 2)	
Jack Mason	38	Dallas, Texas	Country	Week 1	Eliminated (Week 1)	
Josh Hester	31	Nashville, Tennessee	Country and pop	Week 1	Eliminated (Week 1)	
Michael Todd	31	Atwater, California	Singer-songwriter	Week 1	Eliminated (Week 1)	
Russell Johnson	26	New York, New York	American folk	Week 1	Eliminated (Week 1)	

=== Future appearances ===
Chris Watson and Bri Stauss made their appearance on one episode in season sixteen of The Bachelorette, while performing on one of the dates to one of the contestants from that season.

Rudi Gutierrez competed on the 24th season of The Voice under the name "Rudi". She was a member of Team Gwen and was eliminated in the Playoffs.

== Production ==
In January 2020, ABC announced a straight-to-series order for a new spin-off of The Bachelor franchise titled The Bachelor Presents: Listen to Your Heart. The series is produced by Next Entertainment in association with Warner Horizon Television, with Mike Fleiss, Martin Hilton, Nicole Woods, Bennett Graebner, Peter Gust, Tim Warner, Louis Caric, and Peter Geist serving as executive producers, and Chris Harrison hosting. Filming had commenced in February 2020 prior to the COVID-19 pandemic.

== Episodes ==
No.	Title	Original release date	Prod. code	U.S. viewers (millions)	Rating/share (18–49)
1	"Week 1: Series Premiere"	April 13, 2020	101	2.95	0.7
Twenty musicians arrive at the mansion. The first date card arrives and it is for Ryan, and he brings Jamie along on a date. Another date card arrives for Matt. Despite the strong connection between him and Rudi, he chooses to bring Mel on the date, which upsets Rudi. Matt and Mel do not develop a deeper connection on the date, leaving Matt nervous about not receiving a rose. Michael, Jack, Josh, and Russell are eliminated.
2	"Week 2"	April 20, 2020	102	2.79	0.6
Three new women arrive in the mansion in this episode: Ruby, Natascha, and Mariana. Jamie receives a date card and brings Trevor with her. Natascha arrives and realizes that she knows Trevor through his ex. When Trevor and Jamie return, she confronts him about it, and he admits to emotional cheating. Jamie is upset but decides to continue her relationship with Trevor. The next date card goes to Bri, and she chooses Chris and they go to Guitar Center. Another date card arrives for Sheridan, and he brings Julia to the iHeartRadio studio. Yet another date card arrives for Savannah, and she brings Brandon. Mel is upset when Savannah chooses Brandon. Mel, Cheyenne, and Mariana are eliminated.
3	"Week 3"	April 27, 2020	103	2.81	0.6
Chris Harrison announces that the couples will begin performing together in front of celebrity judges. Danny and Bekah go on a fashion date, trying on new outfits and having a photoshoot together. Natascha and Ryan go to a Chris Lane concert and sing. First up at the performance are Rudi and Matt, who sing "Fallin All In You" by Shawn Mendes. Next are Bri and Chris, who sing “Beyond” by Leon Bridges. A performance of “Ho Hey” by the Lumineers from Bekah and Danny follows. Brandon and Savannah are next, and they sing “I Want You to Want Me” by Cheap Trick. Julia and Sheridan sing “As Long As You Love Me” by Backstreet Boys. Ryan and Natascha sing “Stay” by Rihanna. Lastly, Jamie and Trevor perform “I Could Use a Love Song” by Maren Morris. Bekah and Danny are eliminated.
4	"Week 4"	May 4, 2020	104	2.74	0.6
5	"Week 5: Semi-Finals"	May 11, 2020	105	2.84	0.6
6	"Finale"	May 18, 2020	TBA	2.96	0.6

== Elimination table ==
Place	Contestant	Week					
Place	Contestant	1 (Note: The women gave out the roses at this week's rose ceremony.)	2 (Note: The men gave out the roses at this week's rose ceremony.)	3 (Note: Neither the men nor the women gave out the roses, instead the couple who the judges felt gave the worst performance did not receive a rose.)	4	5	6
1	Bri	In	Date	In	In	Date	Winners
1	Chris	In	Date	In	Date	Date	Winners
2	Jamie	Date	Date	In	Date	Date	RU
2	Trevor	In	Date	In	In	Date	RU
5	Matt	Date	In	In	In	Date	Quit
6	Rudi	In	In	In	Date	Date	Quit
7–8	Natascha	Wait (Note: The contestant has not yet arrived.)	In	Date	In	Out	
7–8	Ryan	Date	In	Date	Date	Out	
9–10	Brandon	In	Date	In	Out		
9–10	Julia	In	Date	In	Out		
11	Savannah	In	Date	In	Quit		
12	Sheridan	In	Date	In	Quit		
13–14	Bekah	In	In	Out			
13–14	Danny	In	In	Out			
15	Gabe	In	In	Quit			
16	Ruby	Wait	In	Out			
17–19	Mariana	Wait	Out				
17–19	Mel	Date	Out				
17–19	Cheyenne	In	Out				
20–23	Jack	Out					
20–23	Josh	Out					
20–23	Michael	Out					
20–23	Russell	Out					

Winners The contestant won the competition.
RU The contestant was the runner-up of the competition.
In The contestant gave out or received a rose and was safe.
Date The contestant gave out a date card and gave/received a rose.
Date The contestant received a date card and gave/received a rose.
Date The contestant went on a date and received a rose.
Out The contestant did not receive a rose and was eliminated.
Out The contestant was eliminated after their partner quit.
Quit The contestant quit the competition.
Out The contestant went on a date but did not receive a rose and was eliminated.

== Ratings ==
Viewership and ratings per episode of The Bachelor Presents: Listen to Your Heart
No.	Title	Air date	Rating/share (18–49)	Viewers (millions)
1	"Week 1: Series Premiere"	April 13, 2020	0.7	2.95
2	"Week 2"	April 20, 2020	0.6	2.79
3	"Week 3"	April 27, 2020	0.6	2.81
4	"Week 4"	May 4, 2020	0.6	2.74
5	"Week 5"	May 11, 2020	0.6	2.84
6	"Week 6"	May 18, 2020	0.6	2.96
