= Radio Rosa =

Radio station in Copenhagen, Denmark

Radio Rosa was a radio station in Copenhagen, Denmark, during 1983–2010, which broadcast a community radio format for the city's gay, lesbian, bisexual and transgender communities. The station was launched on 22 June 1983 by the Danish National Association of Gays and Lesbians and was one of the world's first gay radio stations.

The programming was varied and included entertainment programs, debates, culture, events, youth and information on HIV/AIDS. It was broadcast on the 98.9 FM frequency, which has been shared with other community radio projects, for the area of the capital, Copenhagen, and for Frederiksberg. The work was carried out completely by volunteers. Since its launch it had been issuing continuously with the exception of the five months that, between 2007 and 2008, during the process of separation of the LBL. It closed on 1 August 2010.
