= Nuuk Pride =

LGBT festival in Greenland

Nuuk Pride is an LGBTQ festival which is held every June in Nuuk, Greenland. A colourful and festive occasion, it combines political issues with concerts, films and a parade and different arrangements. The focal point is Katuaq in the city centre. It usually opens on the day of the Pride arrangement, culminating with a parade. The first time the pride was held, some 1,000 gay, lesbian, transgender and bisexual people and supporters took part in the parade with floats and flags.

== History ==
Nuuk Pride was first organized in 2010 by Inuk woman Nuka Bisgaard.

== See also ==
- Pride parade
- LGBT Qaamaneq
- LGBT rights in Greenland
- LGBT rights in Denmark
- Sipineq+

== Sources ==
- Hensen, Maartje (2023). The pride atlas : 500 iconic destinations for queer travelers. San Francisco: Chronicle Books. ISBN 9781797217550. OCLC 1345217381.
