= LGBTQ rights in Greenland =

- Location of Greenland
- Legal status: Never criminalised in Greenlandic law. Legal since 1933, age of consent equalized in 1977 (Danish law)
- Gender identity: Transgender persons allowed to change legal gender without a diagnosis, hormone therapy, surgery or sterilization
- Military: LGBT people allowed to serve openly
- Discrimination protections: Some sexual orientation protections (see below)

Family rights
- Recognition of relationships: Same-sex marriage since 2016
- Adoption: Full adoption rights since 2016

Lesbian, gay, bisexual, transgender, and queer (LGBTQ) rights in Greenland are some of the most extensive in the Americas and the world, relatively similar to those in Denmark proper in Europe. Same-sex sexual activity is legal, with an equal age of consent, and there are some anti-discrimination laws protecting LGBT people. Same-sex couples had access to registered partnerships, which provided them with nearly all of the rights provided to married opposite-sex couples, from 1996 to 2016. On 1 April 2016, a law repealing the registered partnership act and allowing for same-sex marriages to be performed came into effect.

In 1979, Denmark granted Greenland home rule and in 2009 extended self-government, although it still influences the island's culture and politics. Greenland is considered to be very socially liberal towards LGBT people. Acceptance of homosexuality and same-sex relationships is high, and reports of discrimination against LGBT people are rare. Nonetheless, due to Greenland's small and scattered population, many Greenlandic LGBT people have moved to Copenhagen in Denmark.

== Law regarding same-sex sexual activity ==
As is the case with Denmark, same-sex sexual activity is not a crime. It was legalized by Denmark in 1933, and the age of consent was equalized in 1977 at 15, two years prior to home rule.

== Recognition of same-sex relationships ==
Greenland adopted Denmark's registered partnership law on 1 July 1996. There was some opposition to registered partnerships from clergy and conservative lawmakers, who later chose to abstain from voting. The bill was passed in the Greenlandic Parliament 15–0 with 12 abstentions, and later by the Danish Parliament 104–1. The first same-sex couple to register did so in 2002. Registered partnerships are called nalunaarsukkamik inooqatigiinneq in Greenlandic.

In March 2015, MP Justus Hansen, from the Democrats, introduced a bill to legalise same-sex marriage in Greenland, which also included adoption rights and other changes to Greenlandic family law. The bill was approved unanimously (27–0) by the Parliament of Greenland on 26 May 2015, but required Danish approval before coming into effect. Initially, the bill was to come into effect on 1 October 2015, but lapsed due to the Danish general elections in June 2015. The parliamentary procedure therefore had to start over and the new Venstre Government put an identical bill on the agenda for its first reading on 5 November 2015. On 19 January 2016, the Folketing (Danish Parliament) approved the proposal 108–0 and the bill was given royal assent by Queen Margrethe II on 3 February 2016. The parts of the law relating to marriage went into effect on 1 April 2016.

Same-sex marriage became legal on 1 April 2016. Application in Greenland of the registered partnership law was repealed the day the new marriage law took effect.

== Adoption and family planning ==
Same-sex couples in registered partnerships have been permitted to adopt their stepchildren since 1 June 2009. A law regarding in vitro fertilization (IVF) for female couples was approved in 2006. The parts of the same-sex marriage law allowing same-sex couples to adopt children jointly went into effect on 1 July 2016.

== Discrimination protections ==
Since 2010, Greenland has outlawed hate speech and provided penalty enhancements to hate crimes motivated by sexual orientation. Article 100 of the Criminal Code prohibits speech which may deprive, threaten or demean individuals on the basis of their sexual orientation, among other categories.

Greenland’s parliament passed a Law on Equal Treatment and Anti-Discrimination in May 2024, taking effect on 1 July 2024. The law prohibits all discrimination on the basis of “sexual orientation, gender identity, gender expression, [and] gender characteristics,” among other characteristics. The law also creates an Equal Treatment Board to manage discrimination complaints and an Equality Council to promote non-discrimination.

The Human Rights Council of Greenland, funded by the state budget, promotes and protects human rights in Greenland. It is commissioned to participate in the strengthening and consolidation of human rights, and works closely with the Danish Institute for Human Rights.

== Transgender rights ==
The Act on Sterilisation and Castration (Greenlandic: Kinguaassiorsinnaajunnaarsagaaneq pillugu inatsit; Danish: Lov om sterilisation og kastration) of the Realm of Denmark came into force in Greenland in 1975, allowing sex changes in the country.

Transgender people in Greenland may change the sex designation on their official identity documents. A law passed in 2016 by decree allows legal sex changes based on self-determination. Transgender people can apply to change their legal gender without undergoing sex reassignment surgery, hormone therapy, sterilization or receiving a medical diagnosis.

Since 2016, Greenlanders over 18 years of age who wish to apply for a legal sex change can do so by stating that they want to change their documentation, followed by a six-month-long "reflection period" to confirm the request.

Besides male and female, Greenlandic passports are available with an "X" sex descriptor.

== LGBT rights movement in Greenland ==
Due to the small and scattered population, there is virtually no gay scene in Greenland. Some nightclubs and bars in the capital Nuuk have a mixed gay and straight crowd. Many Greenlandic LGBT people have moved to Nuuk, Sisimiut, Ilulissat or Copenhagen in Denmark. There was an LGBT rights organization called "Qaamaneq" (Light) from 2002 to 2007 which organized social and cultural events. The organization was reestablished in 2014 as LGBT Qaamaneq.

GlobalGayz describes Greenland as a model for LGBT rights; "[a]s for gay marriage ... Greenland was distinct among almost every other country in the world. The issue caused virtually no one's heart to skip a beat. Other countries that now allow gay marriage experienced dramatic demonstrations, resistance and delay, even in Denmark .... In Greenland there were no demands in the streets for marriage equality, no lengthy advocacy, very little governmental debate and virtually no media coverage. Indeed, one native said 'gay rights have come from the work of straight people'." The legalisation of registered partnerships in 1996 and same-sex marriage in 2016 fueled very little opposition and stirred little to no debate.

On 15 May 2010, Greenland held its first pride parade in Nuuk. It was attended by about 1,000 people.

== Summary table ==
Same-sex sexual activity legal	Yes (Since 1933)
Equal age of consent (15)	Yes (Since 1977)
Anti-discrimination laws in employment	Yes (Since 2024)
Anti-discrimination laws in the provision of goods and services	Yes (Since 2024)
Anti-discrimination laws in hate speech	Yes (Since 2010)
Anti-discrimination laws concerning gender identity	Yes (Since 2024)
Same-sex marriage(s)	Yes (Since 2016)
Recognition of same-sex couples	Yes (Since 1996)
Stepchild adoption by same-sex couples	Yes (Since 2009)
Joint adoption by same-sex couples	Yes (Since 2016)
LGBT people allowed to serve in the military	Yes (Since 1978; the Kingdom of Denmark responsible for defence)
Right to change legal gender	Yes (Since 1975)
Access to IVF for lesbian couples	Yes (Since 2006)
Commercial surrogacy for gay male couples	No (Illegal for heterosexual couples also)
MSMs allowed to donate blood	Yes / No (Since March 2020, 4-month deferral period. The deferral period is waived if the individual is in a stable monogamous relationship; Transfusion Medicine Standards published by the Danish Society for Clinical Immunology applies)

== See also ==
- LGBT rights in Denmark
- LGBT rights in the Americas
- LGBT rights by country or territory
- Nuuk Pride
