= Michael Rune =

Danish saxophonist and club act

Michael Rune is a Danish saxophonist and club act.

== Beginnings ==
Michael Rune studied music in Det Fynske Musikkonservatorium music school in 2006. His debut single "Min indre stemme" featuring Nadia Gattas was produced by Darwich and saxophone Aldi melodies by Michael. It became a Danish club hit in 2011. The single was released on 5 August 2011 and reached #6 on the Danish Singles Chart.

He has collaborated with well-known names like Kato, Rune RK and Brian Tappert (from Soulfuric) and played in tens of venues including ABC Beach Party and The Voice in 2010 at Plænen i Tivoli, Roskilde Festival, Samsø, Langeland, Nibe and Midtfyns festivals. A debut album is in preparation.

== Dansk Melodi Grand Prix 2014 ==
Michael Rune took part on March 8, 2014, in the Danish qualification round Dansk Melodi Grand Prix 2014 in a bid to represent Denmark in Eurovision Song Contest 2014. Michael Rune's song "Wanna Be Loved" features the vocals of American singer Natascha Bessez. The song was written by Martin Larsson and Lars Halvor Jensen, also known as part of the production team DeeKay, together with former English soul artist Lemar Obika. DeeKay had written Brinck's song "Believe Again" that represented Denmark in Eurovision Song Contest 2009 as well as Ireland's entry 2011 entry "Lipstick" sung by Jedward.

Michael Rune's song finished joint runner-up with Rebekka Thornbech and "Your Lies" to eventual winner Basim, the Danish singer of Moroccan descent with his winning song "Cliché Love Song". Michael Rune collected 15 of a possible 60, so did Thornbech against 30 points to the winner Basim. "Wanna Be Loved" has proved popular with the Danish public entering at #9 on Tracklisten, the official Danish Singles Chart following the Dansk Melodi Grand Prix finals.

== Discography ==
Year	Title	Peak chart positions	Certifications
Year	Title	DEN	Certifications
2011	"Min indre stemme" (feat. Nadia Gatta)	6	
2012	"Væk i natten" (feat. Cecilie Fleur)	26	
2013	"Et og alt" (feat. Kevin)	–	
2014	"Wanna Be Loved" (feat. Natascha Bessez)	9	
