= Lambda (association) =

Danish LGBTQ organization

Lambda is an association for gay people in Odense, Denmark, founded in 1993. The community wants to strengthen the identities of gays and lesbians, and work with other gay communities for gay rights.

== The name Lambda ==
The organizations name originated from the Greek letter L λ, derived from a mythical regiment of Greek warriors said to have carried a flag with the Lambda sign in front of them on their way to war.

The character was chosen by a group of activists in 1970, as a symbol of the homopolitical movement, and gay associations and projects throughout the world have since added the name Lambda into their name.

== History ==
The Danish National Association of Gays and Lesbians (Landsforeningen for Bøsser og Lesbiske or LBL) originally had a local division in Odense, which between 1991 and 1993 hosted the Discotek club and ran the Café Pan in Sankt Anne Gade in central Odense. When the club was closed down, the whole board resigned in protest, and when the LBL didn't succeed in rebuilding the local division in Odense, a group of people decided to make a new gay community. They founded Lambda on 11 September 1993, after a meeting in Brandts Klædefabrik in Odense. In 1994 Pan Odense had to close again, and a lot of gay people didn't have a place to party. Lambda rented premises in the basement of Vindegade 100, with a café open on every Friday and Saturday, and a big Rainbowparty every other weekend until June 2005. In June 2005, Lambda had to move, as the building was going to be used for apartments. In October 2007 a new location was found in Odense Centrum.

In autumn 2005, Lambda started a collaboration with Studenterhus Odense, which was completed at the end of the year, due to the fact that Student Housing Odense had a mess in the economy, thus creating a residency for the association. Since March 2006 and 2007, Lambda had a party for homoseksuality at Club Retro / Boubous while the board worked to find new premises. From 2008 to 2010, the association has held parties in collaboration with a number of cafés and clubs in the city, including Blomsten and Bien, Mozaik and Globe.

== Brogade ==
At the club's 15th birthday, September 11, 2008, the association opened its doors for its new café in Brogade 3 in Odense . The association had taken over the premises already in November 2007, but the renovation of the premises, taken over after the "Optimist", pulled out. The renovation was largely done using voluntary labor.

The premises in Brogade must be considered a compromise in relation to what the association intended for relocating from Vindegade. The association had wanted premises that were located in street level opposite the premises in Vindegade, which were relatively hidden in the basement level. There was also a desire to be closer to the city center, and there should be room for both association activities and to have a café and disco. Brogade is located not closer to the city and there is also no room for big parties in the premises. On the other hand, the premises are in street level and there is room for both café and association activities.

Lambda's café is relatively well attended and had in 2009 a turnover of 356.000 kr.

== Activities ==
There is ongoing collaboration with the Culture Machine in Odense, where Lambda's monthly parties are held. In addition, the association has cafe operations in Brogade 3, 5000 Odense C every Thursday, Friday and Saturday. In addition, there are several activities during the year. mentioned Copenhagen Pride.

== Lambda's Groups ==
Lambda has from the outset set up different groups aimed at different target groups. The association has among other things had an MC group, film group, youth group.

=== Rainbow Kids ===
Rainbow Kids (formerly Family Group) focus on Rainbow families and have a number of social activities. The group is not so visible in the association itself as they do not meet in the association's premises.

=== Advice ===
Advice is the group's most active group. Advice is offered to people with doubts about sexual orientation and / or gender identity.

=== Info group ===
The Info Group (formerly Go-Out Group) visits schools, associations and other interested in lectures on homosexuality. Among other things, the group is present on behalf of Lambda at the University of Southern Denmark's Studstartsmesse in Odense. The lectures are based on prejudices about homosexuality.

=== Lambda News ===
Lambda News was the association's membership magazine, published six times a year in the even months. In 2006, lambda news was through a crisis, without premises, many of Lambda's members fell off, and not many contributed to the member magazine. At the same time, the magazine was long without editor to collect the articles. This resulted in a fusion with other small local magazines in the province and they started the magazine Fusion . The merger has since been closed, and the association currently has no member magazine. Instead, the magazine is published "Out & About".
