= Aarhus Pride =

Annual LGBT event in Aarhus, Denmark

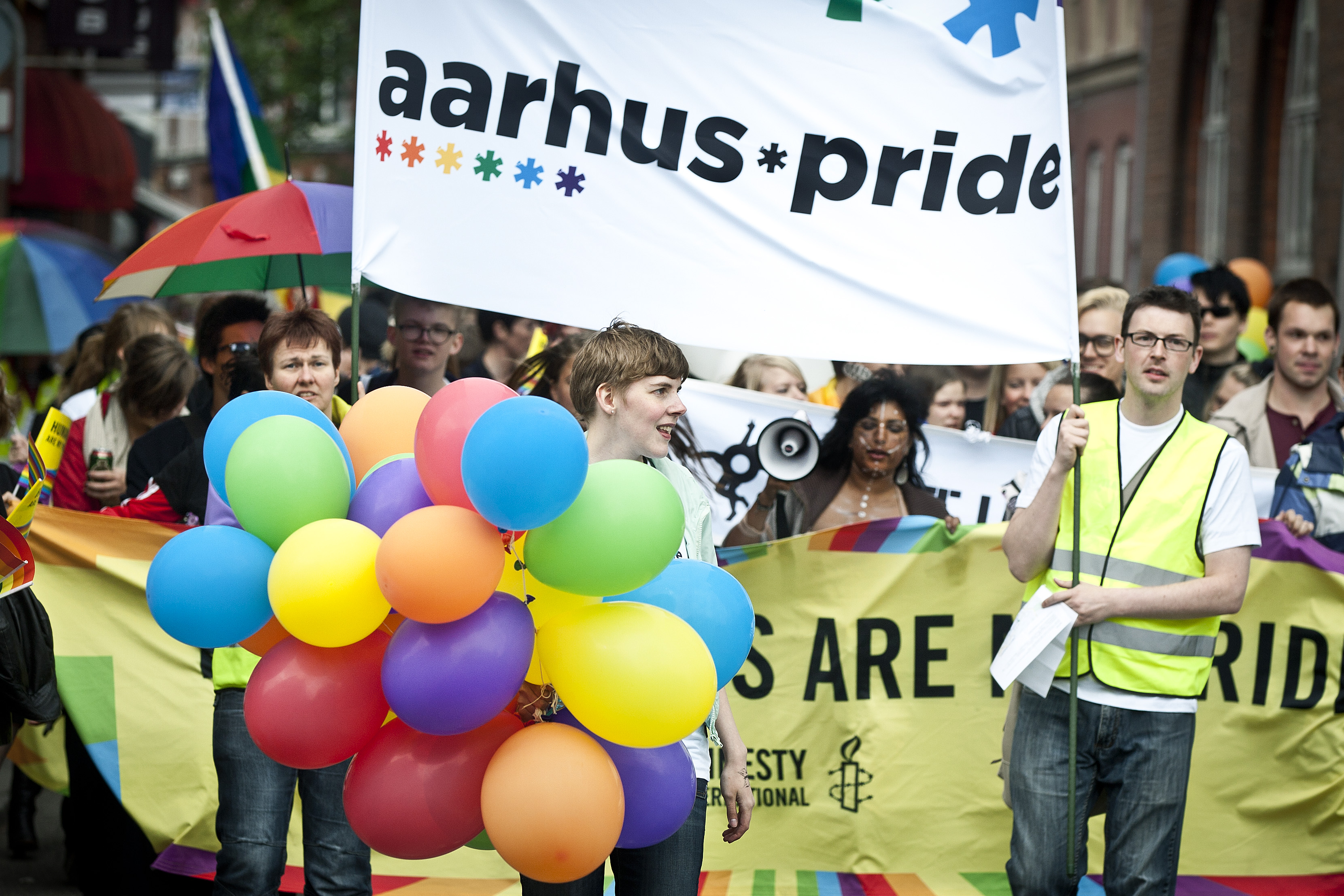
- Aarhus Pride Parade 2015
- Genre: Festival
- Frequency: Annually
- Locations: Aarhus, Denmark
- Years active: 2012-present
- Website: aarhuspride.dk

Aarhus Pride is a pride parade in Aarhus, Denmark and the largest Danish event focused on LGBT issues outside Copenhagen. The first event was held in 2012 and has been repeated every year since. It is managed and controlled by private individuals from the LGBT community and supported with funds from the city of Aarhus. In 2017, about 6,000 people took part in the 3.5-kilometre-long (2.2 mi) parade with floats and flags.

The parade is held every year on the first Saturday of June and lasts from morning to late night. The first event is the parade itself which moves through the historical Latin Quarter before it ends back at Vester Allés Kaserne where a festival is held until evening. The festival includes various sports like volleyball, badminton, foosball etc. on the green areas in front of the Concert Hall next to the Officers Square and a children's area with bouncy castle and playground. Local and national LGBT associations, organizations, companies and political parties man booths with information and food and drink. Various activities take place on the small stage located centrally next to the Aarhus Concert Hall. DJs plays music.
