= Axel and Eigil Axgil =

First gay couple to be legally registered

Axel Axgil
- Eigil and Axel Axgil in 1950
- Born: Axel Lundahl-Madsen; 3 April 1915
- Died: 29 October 2011 (aged 96)

Eigil Axgil
- Born: Eigil Eskildsen; 24 April 1922
- Died: 22 September 1995 (aged 73)

Axel Axgil (3 April 1915 – 29 October 2011) and Eigil Axgil (24 April 1922 – 22 September 1995) were Danish gay activists and a longtime couple. They were the first gay couple in the world to enter into a registered partnership following Denmark's legalisation of same-sex partnership registration in 1989, a landmark legislation which they brought about. They adopted the surname, Axgil, a combination of their given names, as an expression of their commitment.

== Biography ==
Axel, born Axel Lundahl-Madsen, and Eigil, born Eigil Eskildsen, inspired by the 1948 UN Declaration of Human Rights, together with friends, founded F-48 or Forbundet af 1948 (The Association of 1948), Denmark's first gay rights organization. By 1951, membership had grown to 1,339 with branches in Sweden and Norway. In 1985, F-48 became the Danish National Association of Gays and Lesbians (Landsforeningen for Bøsser og Lesbiske, Forbundet af 1948 or LBL). The couple launched a magazine, Vennen (The Friend).

In 1989, Denmark became the first nation to recognize registered partnerships for same-sex couples, nearly equal to opposite-sex marriage. On 1 October 1989, the Axgils and 10 other Danish couples were married by Tom Ahlberg, deputy mayor of Copenhagen, in the city hall. The Axgils had been a couple for 40 years. In 2013, Axel Axgil was named by Equality Forum as one of 31 icons of the LGBT History Month. LGBT Denmark's annual awards show, Danish Rainbow Awards – AXGIL, is named after them.

In 2012, it was revealed that in the midst of Germany's occupation of Denmark during World War II, Eigil had enlisted in the Waffen-SS in 1943 and served with them until the end of the war. Eigil Axgil was subsequently prosecuted for his Waffen-SS membership after the war but managed to keep it mostly to himself until Axel Axgil, rather reluctantly, confirmed it in his biography which was released in 2012. The revelation thus sparked turmoil and controversy because of the Axgils' contribution to the Danish LGBT community, and calls were made for LGBT Denmark to strike their surname from the "Danish Rainbow Awards – AXGIL".

== Deaths ==
Eigil Axgil died on 22 September 1995 at the age of 73. Axel Axgil died on 29 October 2011 at the age of 96.

== See also ==
- Same-sex marriage in Denmark
