= LGBT+ Danmark =

Danish LGBTQ association

Coordinates: 55.6781°N 12.5733°E

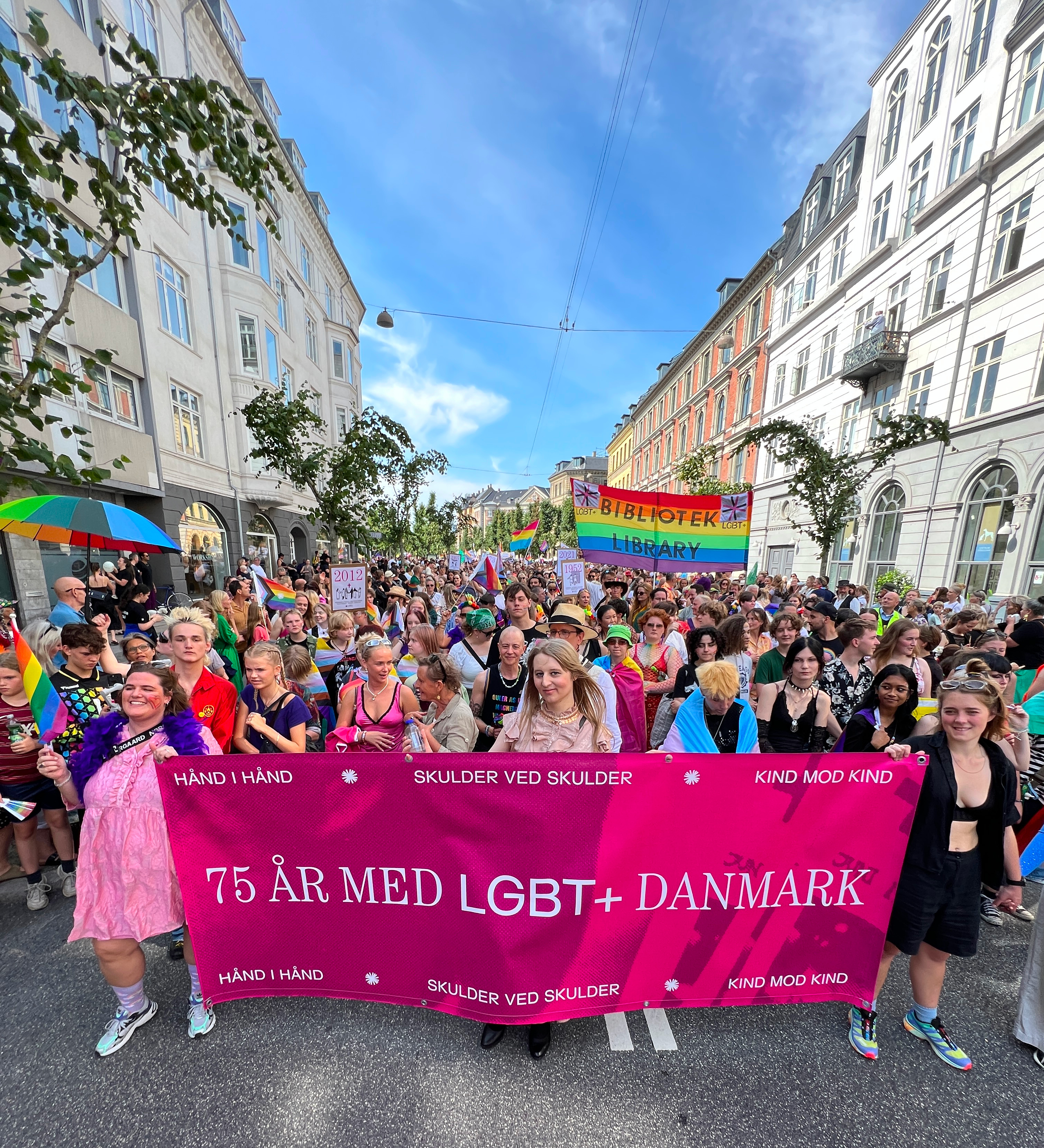
LGBT+ Denmark leads the parade at Copenhagen Pride 2023 on occasion of its 75th anniversary.

LGBT+ Danmark – Landsforeningen for bøsser, lesbiske, biseksuelle og transpersoner (Danish: LGBT+ Denmark – The Danish National Organisation for Gay Men, Lesbians, Bisexuals and Transgender persons) is a social, cultural and political association for gays, lesbians, bisexuals and transgender people.

The association was founded in 1948 as Circle of 1948 (Kredsen af 1948). The Norwegian Organisation for Sexual and Gender Diversity and the Swedish Federation for Lesbian, Gay, Bisexual and Transgender Rights originated as, respectively, the Norwegian and the Swedish branches of the Danish group.

LGBT+ Denmark has played a key role in making Denmark one of the countries in the world with the highest degree of freedoms, rights and protections for sexual and gender minorities.

== History ==
The association's founder and first chairman was Axel Lundahl Madsen, later Axel Axgil, who held the chairman position until 1952. Inspired by the United Nations' Universal Declaration of Human Rights, in Paris on 10 December 1948, he, his partner Eigil Eskildsen (later also Axgil) and other friends founded the association under the name Kredsen af 1948. In 1949 the name became Forbundet af 1948, F-48 for short. By 1951, F-48's membership had grown to 1,339. In 2009 the current name was introduced.

The couple also published the first issue of an illegal paper with homoerotic content, Vennen (The Friend), in 1949, and continued to publish from 1959 until 1970.

== Aims ==
For the majority of its existence, LGBT+ Denmark has been a lobby for gays and lesbians, but since 2002 bisexuals and since 2008 transgender people have also been officially included.

LGBT+ Denmark's aim is to work for gay, lesbian, bisexual and transgender people's political, social, cultural and workplace equality at every level of society. The association seeks to work against discrimination and to function as a dedicated lobby for the purpose of influencing lawmakers, for example in areas such as marriages, adoption, the artificial insemination of lesbians, and rights for transpersons.

From January 1954 onwards the association published a magazine, Panbladet. Since December 2007 the publication has been on temporary hold due to financial problems.

On 22 June 1983, Copenhagen's gay radio station Radio Rosa was founded by the LBL. It later operated independently of the association, but closed down in 2010.

== Chairpersons throughout the years ==
- 1948–1952: Axel Axgil
- 1952–1958: Holger Bramlev
- 1958–1970: Erik Jensen
- 1970–1978: Per Kleis Bønnelycke
- 1978–1986: Henning Jørgensen
- 1986–1989: Bruno Pedersen
- 1989–1994: Else Slange
- 1994: Susan Peters
- 1994: Søren Baatrup
- 1994–1998: Søren Laursen
- 1998–2002: Bent Hansen
- 2002–2005: Peter Andersen
- 2005–2007: Mikael Boe Larsen
- 2007: Patricia Duch
- 2007–2008: Maren Granlien
- 2008: Kristoffer Petterson
- 2008–2011: HC Seidelin
- 2011–2014: Vivi Jelstrup
- 2014–2017: Søren Laursen
- 2017–2019: Peder Holk Svendsen
- 2019–2023: Ask Ulrich Petersen
- 2023–2024: Nanna Sjøgren Wills Hansen
- 2024 – : Morten Grumstrup

== See also ==
- LGBT rights in Denmark
- Lambda
- Norwegian National Association for Lesbian and Gay Liberation
- List of LGBT rights organizations
