= Tim Christensen and The Damn Crystals =

Studio album by Tim Christensen and The Damn Crystals
- Released: 25 November 2011
- Recorded: 28 January – 11 February 2011; STC Studios (Copenhagen); Grapehouse Studio (Copenhagen; track 10)
- Genre: Rock
- Length: 45:49
- Label: Mermaid, Sony Music, Sony Music Japan
- Producer: Tim Christensen, Frank Birch Pontoppidan, The Damn Crystals

Tim Christensen chronology
Superior (2008)	Tim Christensen and The Damn Crystals (2011)	The EP Series, Volume 1: Acoustic Covers (2012)

Singles from Tim Christensen and The Damn Crystals
- 1. "Surprise Me" Released: 21 October 2011; 2. "Happy Ever After" Released: 31 January 2012

Tim Christensen and The Damn Crystals is the fourth studio album by Danish singer-songwriter Tim Christensen, and the eponymous first album of the formation Tim Christensen and The Damn Crystals. The album was released on 25 November 2011 on CD and as music download. The vinyl release was delayed to 20 December 2011 due to printing issues affecting quality. A Japanese bonus edition was released on 23 May 2012.

== Overview ==
In many respects, Christensen's fourth studio album is a clear break with his previous albums. Among others the mixing and mastering are performed by different people than those Christensen usually worked with. This was because he wanted to try something new. He wanted to record in a new manner, with a new co-producer and in a new studio.

Christensen's first three solo albums got progressively quieter and more mature but this trend has come to a halt with this album being "noticeably less quiet than Superior." Christensen also announced well in advance that "the album has a lot of rock elements here and there. In general you can say that it's less acoustic and less traditional singer/songwriter-ish as last time and more outgoing and band-like," He nevertheless had to fight off the expectations he is making music in line with his former band, Dizzy Mizz Lizzy, with whom he had been on a reunion tour prior to recording this album. He claims to have kept Dizzy Mizz Lizzy "extremely separated" from his professional development.

Previously, Christensen used to write the songs and record the bulk of instruments by himself, but this time he chose to compose and record the album with the backing band he has had since 2005, which is now named The Damn Crystals. Christensen felt that working as a team during the Superior tour had turned out very well, which is why he chose to invite the band members to join him throughout the entire creative process. It was described as coming out of his comfort zone, letting go of control, and breaking with his ego-trip. According to Christensen, "I posed myself a bit of a challenge to let others join in, but it has actually been surprisingly easy," and "A totally different energy has come to this plate because we worked with four more on it. On the whole it has become so much better."

== Songs ==
A total of 12 songs were being considered for the new album.

The album opens with the 11-minute progrock title track "The Damn Crystals". This may be a contracted track of "Reach Out" and "Where the Wild Roses Grow", which are two song titles that appear on an alternate track listing from which the title track's name is missing.

"Surprise Me" was the first single off the album, released on 24 October 2011. According to Christensen, "the single might be the most classic rock-track of the bunch."

"Love and Water" was originally written for Honeyburst while "I'll Let You Know" was written for Christensen's first solo album Secrets on Parade but was skipped as it did not fit into that album's context.

The title to "Far Beyond Driven" was borrowed from Pantera's album title Far Beyond Driven, as Christensen used it as a placeholder lyric when playing a song hook on the acoustic guitar, but was unable to find better lyrics to replace it.

It was uncertain whether the ballad "Never Be One Until We're Two" would be released on this album because of the heavier sound Christensen intended to give this album. The song was known to the audience because Christensen had played it on several occasions, including at Lille VEGA in Copenhagen on 16 September 2009 and on a Dutch radio show on 12 November 2009.

"Caught in the Arms of..." (working title: "Caught in the Eye of...") was likely to make its way onto the album. An unfinished acoustic version of this song appears throughout the documentary "Tim Christensen: From Roskilde to Abbey Road", and a studio version was requested by many fans. The song was completed but not included on the album. On 30 November 2011, Christensen played a full version of the song before a webcam as part of his "low key late night sessions".

Christensen had recorded a cover of "Distant Sun" by Crowded House for the Danish radio station DR P3. It was broadcast on 17 June 2011. The song was later released on the Japanese bonus release.

== Reception ==
Professional ratings
Review scores
Source	Rating
B.T.	6/6 stars
Berlingske	4/6 stars
Politiken	4/6 stars
Soundvenue	4/6 stars
Jyllands-Posten	4/6 stars
GAFFA	3/6 stars
Ekstra Bladet	3/6 stars

One reviewer called the album "distinctly warmer, simpler, and much less pompous". The most ecstatic reviewer from the tabloid paper B.T. wrote: "Not just his best album, but one of Danish rock's best (...) with one perfect pop song after the other." The balance between riffs and melodies form "dynamic contrasts that adorn tremendously well, and underline what a tremendously well-playing band Tim Christensen has gathered around him."

More critical review were written among others by GAFFA, who put that "the melodic curve is on a decline throughout the album," and that "Tim Christensen and The Damn Crystals is a very good rock album, but no more than that. There is simply a lack of durable tunes, which is somewhat paradoxical for an otherwise excellent melody maker." The Ekstra Bladet still views Christensen as the frontman of Dizzy Mizz Lizzy and points out in this light that "all in all, it is the young veteran's strongest solo album, but that says more about its predecessors."

== Track listing ==
- All music composed by Tim Christensen. All songs arranged by Tim Christensen and The Damn Crystals, except "Never Be One Until We're Two", arranged by Tim Christensen.

Tim Christen and The Damn Crystals
No.	Title	Writer(s)	Length
1.	"The Damn Crystals"	Tim Christensen, Marcus Winther-John	10:46
2.	"Surprise Me"	Christensen, Winther-John	4:06
3.	"Far Beyond Driven"	Christensen, Winther-John	4:02
4.	"Million Miles Away"	Christensen	3:58
5.	"Happy Ever After"	Christensen, Winther-John	4:44
6.	"I'll Let You Know"	Christensen, Winther-John	3:49
7.	"Love and Water"	Christensen, Winther-John	3:11
8.	"All Them Losers"	Christensen, Winther-John	2:58
9.	"Wiser"	Christensen, Winther-John	4:40
10.	"Never Be One Until We're Two"	Christensen	3:33
Total length:			45:49

Japan release

The Japanese release contains three bonus tracks, and a bonus disc holding 12 songs from the 26 February 2009 show at Store Vega in Copenhagen, before the band was named The Damn Crystals. The original recording lasts 1:23:58 and can and be seen via Vega Player, where it also includes the songs "Isolation Here I Come", "Two is a Crowd", "Hard to Make You Mine", "Waterline" and "Silverflame". All lyrics written by Tim Christensen, except where noted.

Disc 1 bonus tracks
No.	Title	Writer(s)	Length
14.	"Distant Sun" (originally performed by Crowded House)	Neil Finn	3:01
15.	"Mandocello" (originally performed by Cheap Trick)	Rick Nielsen	4:30
16.	"This Will Be Our Year" (originally performed by The Zombies)	Chris White	2:11
Total length:			55:32

Disc 2: Live in Copenhagen 2009
No.	Title	Writer(s)	Length
1.	"Surfing the Surface"	Christensen	5:14
2.	"Tell Me What You Really Want"	Christensen	4:56
3.	"Jump the Gun"	Christensen	3:25
4.	"Superior"	Christensen, Mike Viola	4:00
5.	"Love Rears Its Ugly Head"	Christensen	4:22
6.	"India"	Christensen	4:36
7.	"Don't Leave Me but Leave Me Alone"	Christensen, Winther-John	9:43
8.	"Love Is a Matter of..."	Christensen	2:47
9.	"Get the Fuck Out of My Mind"	Christensen, Winther-John	6:02
10.	"Rotator"	Christensen	3:11
11.	"Wonder of Wonders"	Christensen, Winther-John	4:11
12.	"Whispering at the Top of My Lungs"	Christensen	5:46
Total length:			58:12

== Personnel ==
Tim Christensen and The Damn Crystals

- Tim Christensen – lead vocals, guitars, record producer
- Lars Skjærbæk – guitars, vocals
- Søren Koch – bass guitar, vocals
- Christoffer Møller – keyboards, vocals
- Jesper Lind – drums

Production

- Rune Harder Olesen – additional percussion
- Frank Birch Pontoppidan – engineer and mixer (on tracks 1–9), producer
- Flemming Rasmussen – mixer (on track 2)
- Rune Nissen-Petersen – engineer and mixer (on track 10)
- The Damn Crystals – producer
- Nick Foss – executive producer
- Mads Mølgaard Helbæk – assistant engineer
- George Marino – mastering
- Nikolaj Vinten – additional mastering and editing
- Paul Wilson – art director
- Helene Hasen – photography
- Silke Hansen – model
- Sabrina Szinay – stylist
- Henrik Seifert – manager

== Trivia ==
During the first weekend of recording this album, jazz legends Scott Hamilton and Jesper Thilo decided to record an album together at STC Studios, but since A-Studio was in use by Christensen and band, they had to move out to the B-Studio.
