= Tim Christensen =

Danish singer-songwriter and musician

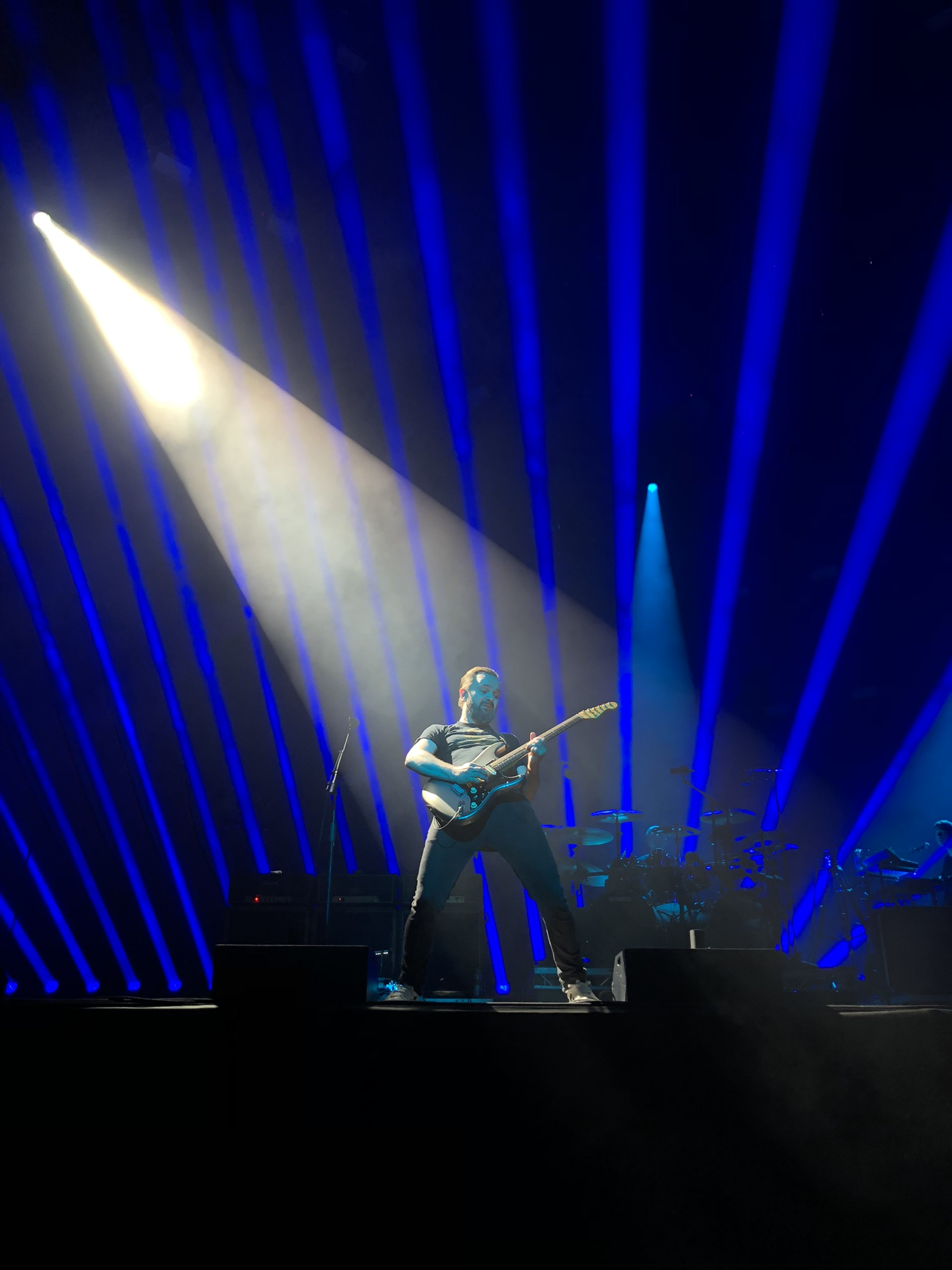
- Tim Christensen performing in 2022

Background information
- Born: 2 July 1974 (age 52)
- Origin: Copenhagen, Denmark
- Genres: Alternative rock, pop rock, power pop, hard rock, folk rock
- Occupations: Singer, songwriter multi-instrumentalist
- Instruments: Vocals, guitar, bass guitar, drums, Mellotron, harmonium, keyboard, piano, organ
- Years active: 1982–current
- Labels: EMI-Medley _{(1993–2005)} Copenhagen _{(2005)} Mermaid/Sony Music _{(2005–current)} PIAS _{(2009)} Parlophone _{(2014)}
- Website: timchristensen.dk

Tim Christensen (born 2 July 1974) is a Danish singer-songwriter and multi-instrumentalist. He is known as the singer, guitarist and songwriter of the Danish alternative rock band Dizzy Mizz Lizzy (1988–1998, 2010, 2014–current) and as a solo artist. Since 2014, he has primarily focused on Dizzy Mizz Lizzy.

Christensen's solo career spans four studio albums, two EPs, and two live DVDs. It is characterized as rock music with pop and folk influences. His biggest musical influences include The Beatles, Led Zeppelin, Nick Drake, Neil Young, Paul McCartney, The Zombies, Cheap Trick, XTC, Crowded House, Jellyfish and Elliott Smith.

== Career ==
=== Early years (1974–1982) ===
Christensen was born in Copenhagen, and became fond of his father's LP records of The Beatles as a small child. He was six years old when John Lennon was murdered, and many documentaries and performances of The Beatles appeared on television. Christensen was impressed by how The Beatles played, which inspired him to start playing on his father's acoustic guitar. He received his first guitar from a distant uncle.

Christensen's parents were divorced, and his half-sister lived up in North Denmark. His family wasn't very wealthy, but when he was eight years old, his father received a one-time sum of money and gave Christensen two choices: either to build a pool in the back yard or to go on vacation to Lennon's hometown of Liverpool and to the legendary Abbey Road Studios in London. Christensen chose the latter, and recalls that this was the only time his family went on a vacation. At that age he also played in a children's rock band that performed at schools and he started writing his own songs.

Playing the guitar felt natural to Christensen, and he did not feel like taking lessons and having to practice "stupid children's songs". However, at the recreation center in Espergærde he met Bent, a musician who practiced there and became a sort of mentor to Christensen. He arranged that Christensen was allowed to play in the basement of the recreation center and start the children's rock band Crep, which he formed with some friends in 1982. They released a three-track recording in 1985 called En aften i fredagscafeen (An evening at Friday Café) and recorded a 4-song demo. Crep disbanded when Christensen's family moved from the village of Espergærde to the Valby district of Copenhagen in 1988. He received his first Fender Stratocaster as a gift.

=== Dizzy Mizz Lizzy (1988–1998) ===
Dizzy Mizz Lizzy was founded in 1988 by Christensen, his classmate Martin Nielsen, whom he had become friends with on the first day of school, and drummer Søren Friis, who was recommended to them by a friend. Nielsen took on the bass guitar because Christensen already played electric guitar. Critics would explain: "From the outset it was clear that Tim Christensen was the group's undisputed center, but the band benefited significantly from the collective dynamics." They initially played glam rock but were inspired by Nirvana's music to switch to power rock. They were signed with EMI-Medley after winning Denmark's largest rock talent contest, DM i Rock, in 1993. Their eponymous debut album, released in 1994, has sold over 250,000 copies in Denmark and 100,000 copies in Japan. The band toured through Denmark, Europe and Japan. They recorded the album Rotator at the Abbey Road Studios and released it in 1996, selling 100,000 copies in Denmark and Japan, followed by another extensive tour.

The band decided to take a year off in 1997, during which time Christensen performed in a television show with B.B. King, and helped with the start-up of Swan Lee, the band of his then-girlfriend Pernille Rosendahl. Rosendahl was a major support for him when recording Dizzy Mizz Lizzy's second album Rotator in London as the other band members did not share Christensen's enthusiasm, nor could they appreciate the unique symbolism recording in these legendary studios as much as Christensen. This meant Christensen had no one to share his palette of emotions with, causing him to turn to Rosendahl in and out of the studio. This further added to the crisis and caused Christensen to become increasingly estranged from the band. Nielsen and Friis even went as far as labeling the couple as "John and Yoko", referring to the supposed detrimental influence of Yoko Ono on John Lennon that contributed to the break-up of the Beatles. Christensen and Rosendahl had formed the band Swan Lee in 1996 with guitarist Jonas Struck and drummer Emil Jorgensen, and entered the Tomorrow Never Dies soundtrack contest by writing a song of the same name. The contest was won by Sheryl Crow. It was around that time Christensen first bought and experimented with a Mellotron, which would continue to feature on many of his songs. Christensen also produced Rosendahl's 1997 demo Dream Away, and wrote arrangements for and played several instruments on some of Swan Lee's earlier songs. When Christensen met with his bandmates from Dizzy Mizz Lizzy on 10 March 1998 at the Rosenborg Castle Gardens, they decided to split up because they were fatigued. Because Christensen was "bitten by a mad Mellotron" and was involved with several music projects, critics speculated he would come up with something before too long.

=== Secrets on Parade (1998–2003) ===
Due to the break-up of Dizzy Mizz Lizzy, Christensen became even more introverted, while his girlfriend could not handle him being in a crisis. Christensen considers the time after his break-up with the band and then Rosendahl to be the deepest low point in his career, which also inevitably led him to step out of Swan Lee in 1999. He had not seen all this coming, as he was living in a dream: "We believed that we were still down to earth, but that was very unrealistic. Only afterwards did we learn we were skating around on a silver platter. Since day one, we had solely tasted success, and it is very unhealthy for such a young band to have so much going for them from the start." Nevertheless, he was deeply grateful about the way his career had evolved, but describes it as "a typical example of how you don't know what you've got till it's gone." Christensen became involved in various projects. He was a stand-in guitarist for the Danish Led Zeppelin cover band Led Zeppelin Jam and co-wrote the Inside the Whale 1998 hit "Hvor Er Tiden Der Ta'r Os" ("Where Is The Time That Takes Us"). This was the start of the ongoing collaboration of Christensen with Inside the Whale singer and guitarist Marcus Winther-John, who contribute to each other's music to date. Christensen furthermore played Mellotron and Wurlitzer electric piano on Kashmir's 1999 album The Good Life, and Mellotron on Mew's 2000 album Half the World Is Watching Me. He performed three songs on Mellotron with Kashmir at the 1998 Roskilde Festival, and would continue to perform there as a solo act in 1999, 2001, 2004 (on his 30th birthday), 2009, and 2016 (on his 42nd birthday). In 2010, he played there again with Dizzy Mizz Lizzy (on his 36th birthday), as he previously had done from 1993 through to 1996. The 1994 performance at Roskilde, which was held shortly after their big breakthrough and on his 20th birthday, is named by Christensen as a special highlight in his career.

Christensen used songwriting as a form of therapy to overcome his break-ups with both Dizzy Mizz Lizzy and Pernille Rosendahl, with whom he was involved for five years. Although he had originally been writing these songs for a possible new band, he ended up starting a solo career, which gave Christensen the added benefit of being fully in control. By this time, Christensen had attained a new outlook on his future. The money he earned with living his boyhood dream was largely spent, causing him to shift his ambitions to starting a stable and ongoing career to earn his living, while being able to develop himself both personally and musically. The circumstances had also changed his approach to songwriting. In 1994 he considered music as having first priority and words coming in second, as he is a composer and not an author or a poet, but by 2003 he put equal emphasis on lyrics and music, where his songwriting borrows from his own experiences, thoughts and feelings, making the lyrics more direct. With his approach being comparable to writing a diary, the title of his first solo album Secrets on Parade was explained by a reviewer as: "instead of lying hidden in a drawer somewhere, his secrets are literally on display."

He gathered musicians to record the album with. Before entering the studio in December for four months, they performed six shows, the first being held on 28 June 1999. The public had to get used to the idea of Christensen no longer heading a power trio combined with him choosing a wider musical horizon. At that time, Christensen described the audience's response as follows: "Many run away screaming when they hear that there are two guitarists in the band. But performing live, we have seen that people really like to hear rock music." He had to challenge the expectations of people that were based on his reputation as the driving force of a successful power rock band, and he had to refuse to let that control him and trust his own gut feeling on what he was doing. Although the majority of the material on the album has been written after Dizzy Mizz Lizzy disbanded, the title track "Secrets on Parade", along with "Prime Time" and "Caterpillar", were originally intended for a third Dizzy Mizz Lizzy album that was never made. The album was launched in the autumn of 2000 and the single "Love is a Matter of...." became a hit single. The song "21st Century High" appeared on the soundtrack of the Danish movie Flickering Lights (2000).

=== Honeyburst and Abbey Road (2003–2008) ===
By the time Secrets on Parade was released, some songs were seven years old, and Christensen was eager to move on from this transition album. A year ahead of the release of his second studio album, in 2002, the song "Right Next to the Right One" became a national hit when it was used as the theme song for the Emmy Award winning DR1 drama series Nikolaj og Julie. Christensen picked this song from the demos he had ready when the producer told him what the series were about. It is a quiet ballad; one Christensen considers a masterpiece of his own, but it far removed from the sound of Dizzy Mizz Lizzy. In 2007, this song was covered by Celine Dion, for which Christensen provided the instrumental tracks.

After his successes with two ballads, the general audience for a time got a rather awkward impression of the music he was making: "I sense that the entire general population knows about Dizzy Mizz Lizzy and about Nikolaj og Julie, but nothing of what's in between. That feels very strange because Secrets on Parade after all did sell nearly 60,000 copies and I even scored several hits." It did help him attract a far wider audience than he had before: "I get stopped on the streets by everything from five-year-old children to 60-year-old ladies." He got another wake-up call when over 60.000 people attended his concert at Tivoli Gardens on 30 May 2003; the only time a greater number of visitors attended one of the amusement park's live shows was when Sting performed there. Christensen also discovered his fame as a solo artist was different from the time he headed Dizzy Mizz Lizzy: "There is obviously much more attention being directed towards me than before. It is not something I have worked towards. I had not experienced it before, not even with Dizzy Mizz Lizzy; we were just a band — we were three long-haired guys who looked like all the others, and it was actually pretty anonymous. Now, 10 years later, there is a face to me, while I am also the face that people associate with the band that was big once, and no longer exists." A downside to his public image was that he received more direct criticism: "Most people that come over say sweet things, and then there is someone who just can't keep his mischief to himself. (...) Annoyingly, after a while it is the negative things that hit the hardest. I don't get why I didn't just push that aside and think of the good, but that one negative thing tends to overshadow everything else." Especially some fans of Dizzy Mizz Lizzy could not appreciate the change in musical style: "[they] do not understand that I sit down with an acoustic guitar and a hat on, and sing love songs; then I am suddenly a faggot and so on." Christensen thinks this can be explained to some extent: "Now that I sing more ballads, more girls are starting to like it, so the boys get extremely envious. Now I'm gay rock or whatever."

The second single, "Whispering At the Top of My Lungs", received heavy airplay on DR P3 in the summer of 2003. Honeyburst was released on 1 September 2003 and sold over 130,000 copies. It was described as being quieter and more mature, sometimes offering an explosion of rock, more folkish and with a little twinge of country. It contains more ballads, because Christensen considers these more timeless. He recorded almost every instrument himself; only several songs feature Nicolai Munch-Hansen on bass, and Olaf Olsen or Laust Sonne on drums. The Honeyburst tour went through Denmark and the Netherlands, with a finale on 3 September 2004 at the famous Abbey Road Studios in London. The concert was released on DVD/2CD and 2LP under the name Live at Abbey Road Studios 2004, and includes the documentary "Tim Christensen: From Roskilde to Abbey Road".

In 2003, several key figures at EMI-Medley departed from the label and started Copenhagen Records to give artists more artistic freedom. Christensen had been signed with this label since the start from his career, but the people he used to work closely with at EMI had been replaced by new people he did not know, so he joined them in 2005 after his contract with EMI expired. When his long-time friend and producer Nick Foss started Mermaid Records together with former EMI-colleague Mik Christensen, he switched to their label prior to the release of his next album, Superior. Sony Music Denmark later bought a part of Mermaid Records.

An unreleased song by Christensen called "Maybe Not Anyhow" has been covered in several versions, all crediting Christensen using the pseudonym Charlie Dinsdale. Danish musician Gunnar Mikkelsen rewrote the lyrics for his 2004 song "Haunted Honeymoon", which Dutch rock band Di-rect later covered as "I Forget Your Name" on their live-cd Live & Acoustic (2008), of which the single release failed to catch on. In 2006, Danish boy band Unite covered the song with even different lyrics under the title "Need to Know". Christensen revealed the original lyrics in 2013, and occasionally plays "Maybe Not Anyhow" in acoustic settings. Charlie Dinsdale is also credited as co-writer on "Lille Søster" (2000) by Søs Fenger. Under the pseudonym C.S. Son, Christensen also co-wrote "Find Her" (1997) by YouKnowWho.

Christensen was officially asked to write the people's gift to the wedding of Crown Prince Frederik and Mary Elizabeth Donaldson on 14 May 2004, but he turned it down: "It was flattering, but I thought it sounded a little too corny. The task was much better placed in the hands of Erann DD." Crown Prince Frederik has attended many shows by Dizzy Mizz Lizzy, and Crown Princess Mary is known to love Christensen's solo work.

On 16 August 2006, Christensen briefly reunited with his Dizzy Mizz Lizzy bandmates for a 5-song performance at the charity event Brandalarm (Fire Alarm).

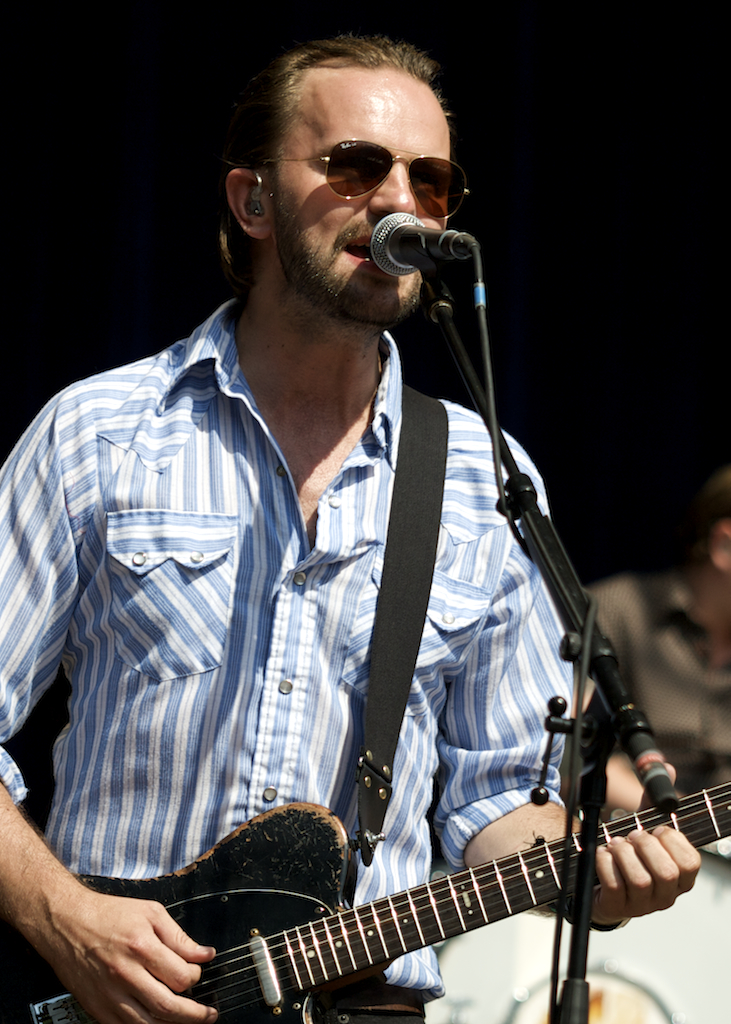
Tim Christensen performing solo at Nibe Festival in 2009.

=== Distributed activities (2008–2014) ===
After Christensen noticed that the cycle of releasing records and going on tours became repetitive, he started diversifying his work. He split his solo career into full-band and acoustic settings, played with the reunited Dizzy Mizz Lizzy, started collaborating with other artists such as Mads Langer, the DR UnderholdningsOrkestret, Gemma Hayes, Mike Viola and Tracy Bonham, and presented a radio show on DR P6 Beat.

==== Solo work ====
During work on his third solo album, entitled Superior, the success of its predecessor Honeyburst and the expectations that followed, laid a burden on his shoulders. It was released on 24 November 2008. He again played almost all instruments himself and experimented with several uncommon instruments such as a baritone guitar and a dulcimer. Olaf Olsen and Laust Sonne played drums on selected songs. Besides touring through Denmark and the Netherlands, he also recorded a show for Rockpalast on 25 March 2009.

On 10 October 2010, Christensen was the closing act at the annual Ken Gudman Prisen award ceremony, where his guitarist Lars Skjærbæk received that year's award. He played the songs "Surfing the Surface", "Tell Me What You Really Want", "Jump The Gun", "Isolation Here I Come", "Superior", and "Whispering at the Top of My Lungs. The only solo performances with a full set Christensen played in 2010 were held in the Netherlands on 4–7 November, for which he received the Inner Ear Media Award for Best Live Show 2010.

On 12 November 2010, EMI released the compilation albums Big-5: Tim Christensen and Big-5: Dizzy Mizz Lizzy as part of their Big-5 series, containing their artists' five best tracks.

Christensen's fourth studio album was released on 25 November 2011. It bears the title Tim Christensen and The Damn Crystals, giving credit to his solo band. The album is a collaborative effort between Christensen and his backing band The Damn Crystals. About the relation of this album to the 2010 reunion and tour of Dizzy Mizz Lizzy, Christensen said: "I have not tried to suck juice from the Dizzy-reunion and use it on my next solo project. To me, Dizzy has been extremely separated from my ongoing development as an artist, musician, or whatever you call it. The reunion was a pit stop to celebrate music. But already one week after the last concert – and I am not lying here – Dizzy was already completely out of my system again. Weird huh?"

The album's first single "Surprise Me" was previewed to the fans for 48 hours on 21 October 2011 and officially released on 24 October 2011. During its first week, DR P3 chose it as "Single of the Week". According to Christensen, "the single might be the most classic rock-track of the bunch." On 14–24 July 2011, they were in the line-up of the Grøn Koncert tour, as in 2002, 2005 and 2009. At the 2011 Danish Music Awards, they performed "Surprise Me" and "Get the Fuck out of My Mind". From 26 January through to 7 April 2012, they held 27 performances throughout Denmark, and performed many more dates on international legs of the tour, including Japan.

In the fall of 2011, In October 2011, Christensen participated as a mentor in the DR project Dr.dk/Sangskriver, which aims to get children and teenagers to sing more. Each week, he would provide feedback to three of the songs that were uploaded to the project's website.

On 17 December 2012, Christensen released The EP Series, Volume 1: Acoustic Covers, a 6-track album with only Christensen singing and playing acoustic guitar, and one duet with Gemma Hayes. Christensen's first two solo albums, Secrets on Parade and Honeyburst, were re-released on vinyl on 19 April 2014 through Parlophone.

From 21 October 2014 onwards, parts of the song "If You Wanna Talk" were revealed as part of the "Knæk Cancer" (Break Cancer) campaign. A short documentary with interviews was released on 27 October via YouTube.

Christensen performed in the tribute concert for the DR UnderholdningsOrkestret (DR Chamber Orchestra) on 26 October 2014. He had played with the orchestra on several occasions and was set to play with them again in 2015 before the announcement of the orchestra's disbanding was made.

On 7 October 2018, Christensen performed the song "Som et strejf af en dråbe" at the memorial concert held for Gasolin' frontman Kim Larsen, who had died of prostate cancer on 30 September 2018. It was attended by around 35,000 people and included performances of several major Danish musicians and groups covering songs of Gasolin' and Larsen.

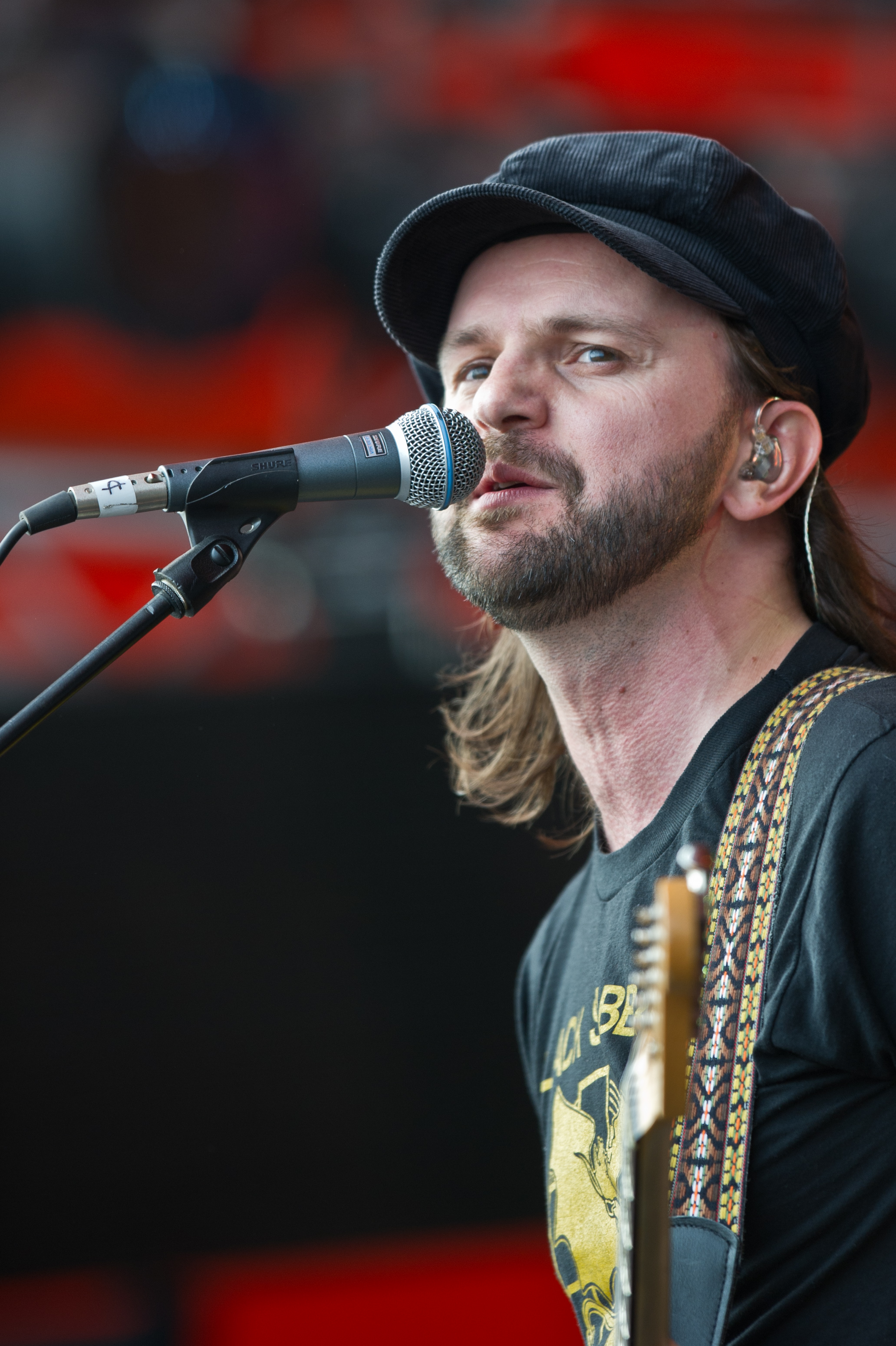
Tim Christensen during Dizzy Mizz Lizzy's performance at Roskilde Festival 2010.

==== Dizzy Mizz Lizzy reunion ====
Between 18 March and 29 September 2010, Christensen went on a reunion tour through Denmark and Japan with Dizzy Mizz Lizzy, playing almost 50 concerts. During the final two concerts in Japan on 28–29 September, Christensen played the solo songs "Love is a Matter Of..." and "Surfing the Surface" acoustically as a precursor to a select few solo shows in Japan later that year. After this, they disbanded amically, though they appeared one more time in public at the film festival CPH:DOX, where a documentary about the band entitled Lost Inside a Dream premiered. Here it received the Politiken Publikumspris (people's choice award).

==== Collaborations with other artists ====
Around the time Christensen worked on the album Superior, he co-wrote the song "Say No More" with Mads Langer, and on 28 February 2009, he performed with Danish indie rock band Figurines on the TV show DR2 Backstage.

Christensen played guitars for Heidi Svelmøe Herløw's second album Talisman (2011, Playground Music), among others on the single "Angerholic" which was released on 29 November 2010, and the song "Shame on Us" on which Christensen features with vocals and guitars. As a contestant for X Factor in 2008, she sang Christensen's song "Whispering at the Top of My Lungs" in the first live show.

Christensen performed a show with Gemma Hayes on 25 August 2011. A year later, she also sang a duet with Christensen on the song "A Way to Say Goodbye", released on The EP Series, Volume 1: Acoustic Covers. On 18 June 2012, Christensen, Mike Viola (with whom Christensen previously co-wrote the songs "One of these Days" and "Superior"), Tracy Bonham, and The Damn Crystals, played a Paul McCartney tribute concert at Vega in Copenhagen, in celebration of McCartney's 70th birthday that same day. The show included the entire album Ram, as well as several post-Beatles songs. The show was recorded and released on 12 February 2013 as Pure McCartney.

On 19 July 2014, the EP Side Effects by Mads Langer and Tim Christensen was released. The first single off the EP, "Bringing Back Tomorrow", was released in June. The duo performed the songs during the 2014 Grøn Koncert tour together with bassist Søren Balsner of Carpark North and drummer Birk Nevel. The collaboration garnered them a GAFFA Award for "Danish rock band of the year", while Side Effects was awarded the "Danish rock album of the year".

=== Dizzy Mizz Lizzy's second era (2014–current) ===
After a four-year hiatus, Christensen wrote the abbreviation "DML2015" on his Facebook wall on 20 October 2014, suggesting another Dizzy Mizz Lizzy reunion. Shortly thereafter, they resumed touring as a band, and revealed new material. At the time, Christensen did not exclude continuing to record and release a new solo album while also fronting Dizzy Mizz Lizzy, because for example his heavy guitar riffs do not fit in his solo work, while Crowded House covers do not fit in with Dizzy Mizz Lizzy. However, except for occasional (acoustic) solo tours, his solo career and his work with The Damn Crystals seems to effectively be put on hold, as he has fully dedicated himself to Dizzy Mizz Lizzy.

On 7 November 2015, the band performed at the Danish Grammy ceremony, where Christensen received the IFPI's Ærespris (Honorary Award), which is considered the most prestigious prize a Danish musician can be awarded.

Dizzy Mizz Lizzy released their third studio album Forward in Reverse on 29 April 2016 to critical acclaim, receiving 2016 GAFFA Awards for both "Danish album of the year" and "Danish rock album of the year". According to critics, it helped the band regain their position as Denmark's most popular rock band. The band's fourth studio album Alter Echo, released on 20 March 2020, was lauded with the GAFFA Award for "Danish rock album of the year", while Christensen received the award for "Songwriter of the year" for the first time in his career. Fans appear to have embraced the new songs as much as the classics.

== Equipment ==
Christensen uses two Vox AC30 amplifiers from the 1960s on top of Marshall 4x12 G1275 cabinets which he got from his parents for his 18th birthday, and plays among others on a 1974 Gibson Hummingbird, an old sunburst Fender Telecaster, a white Fender Stratocaster, a red Gibson ES-330, a deep red Gibson ES-125, and three Rickenbacker 480 guitars from 1973 and 1974 in white or black. He also uses Henning Hansen guitars, and had a worn red Fender Telecaster body revised by them in 2008. In his living room, he keeps a Höfner bass guitar.

== The Damn Crystals ==
The Damn Crystals are Christensen's backing band, both in the studio and on tour. The opening track of the album Tim Christensen and The Damn Crystals is named after them.

=== History ===
Christensen had put together a band to record his first solo album, Secrets on Parade. This was "decidedly a solo album" but the band would support Christensen during nearly every live performance. This is why around this time, Christensen did consider resuming in a band formation like with Dizzy Mizz Lizzy: "We actually spent a lot of time finding a band name, for a band that in reality does not even exist!" It is likely that Secrets on Parade established the name Tim Christensen sufficiently so that there was no longer a need for naming the band. As a result, the band remained nameless until 2011, although fans and Christensen would sometimes refer to it as TeamC as a near-homophone of TimC. The subsequent studio albums Honeyburst and Superior were not recorded in formation, although current and former band members would contribute on select songs. Because the recording sessions for the fourth solo album were done in a band setting and the band members contributed importantly to the album, the band received an official name: The Damn Crystals. This name was introduced on 21 October 2011 with the preview release of the single "Surprise Me".

=== Members ===
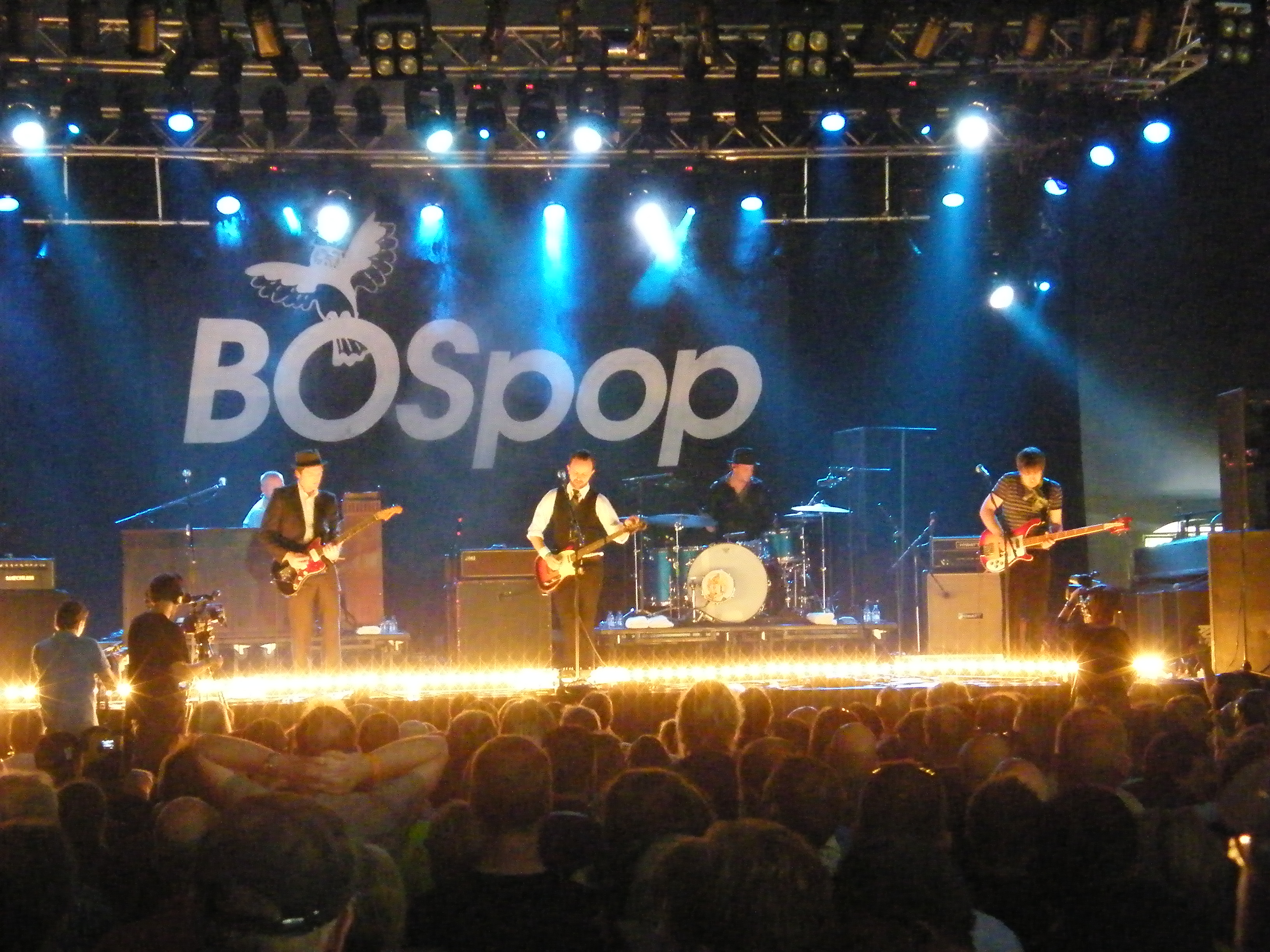
Tim Christensen performing with The Damn Crystals at Bospop 2009.

The band with whom Christensen recorded Secrets on Parade consisted of Lars Skjærbæk from Inside the Whale on guitar, keyboard and Mellotron, Fredrik Damsgård on bass and Laust Sonne on drums. After the completion of the album, Sonne was offered a position as drummer in the hard rock band D-A-D, after which Christensen thought it impossible to find a proper replacement, nor could he find one right away. As a result, his record company EMI-Medley placed an ad in the June issue of GAFFA requesting applications for "a drummer for an established Danish rock artist." Since the album had already been recorded, it asked for an experienced, energetic and technically good drummer between 20 and 30 years old that enjoys both hard and melancholic rock, and is available for a year ahead starting July 2000 for a domestic and international tour and related promotional activities. This call did not remain unanswered, as Christensen explains: "I spent endless difficult nights listening through the applications, but before I had to decide, one of my friends told me about a drummer who had just left his Norwegian band BigBang, which seemed a fantastic opportunity to me. And it went well during a tryout, so we went with him." This was Olaf Olsen, who subsequently moved to Copenhagen for Christensen's cause and Christensen would later admit that "[Olsen] has saved the band" Nicolai Munch-Hansen replaced Damsgård on bass and Skjærbæk stayed. In this setting, the band contributed to Honeyburst, played in the ensuing tour, of which one performance was recorded as Live at Abbey Road Studios 2004. Johan Lei Gellet has stood in for Olsen during the summer of 2002.

Olsen left the band in 2005 to focus on BigBang, to which he had returned in 2001. He was replaced by Jesper Lind, who first performed with the band during the July 2005 Grøn Koncert series. At the time, Lind played on drums in the band Kira and the Kindred Spirits, led by singer Kira Skov who is married to bassist Munch-Hansen. Later in 2005, Munch-Hansen left the band so he and Skov could start a new band, named Kira and the Ghost Riders. He was replaced by Søren Koch, who was a bandmate of Skjærbæk in the band Boat Man Love. Christoffer Møller joined the band on keys, allowing Skjærbæk to focus entirely on playing guitar. This formation has contributed to Superior and its tour, and went into the studio in early 2011 to work with Christensen on his next album. They took on the name The Damn Crystals prior to the release of Tim Christensen and The Damn Crystals.

== Discography ==
=== Studio albums ===
Tim Christensen solo

| Album details | Peak positions | | | |
| Album details | DEN | JPN | NED | NOR |
|---|---|---|---|---|
| Secrets on Parade: Year released: 2000; Record label: EMI | 9 | 82 | – | – |
| Honeyburst: Year released: 2003; Record label: EMI | 1 | 288 | – | 10 |
| Superior: Year released: 2008; Record label: Mermaid Records (Denmark) PIAS Recordings (Netherlands) | 4 | 172 | – | – |

Tim Christensen and The Damn Crystals

| Album details | Peak positions | |
| Album details | DEN | NED |
|---|---|---|
| Tim Christensen and The Damn Crystals: Year released: 2011; Record label: Mermaid Records / Sony Music Denmark | 6 | 69 |

=== Live albums, EPs and compilations ===
Tim Christensen solo

| Album details | Peak positions |
| Album details | DEN |
|---|---|
| Live at Abbey Road Studios 2004: Year released: 2004; Record label: EMI | 30 |
| Big-5: Tim Christensen: Year released: 2010; Record label: EMI | – |
| The EP Series, Volume 1: Acoustic Covers: Year released: 2012; Record label: Mermaid Records Denmark / Sony Music Denmark | – |

Tim Christensen, Mike Viola, Tracy Bonham, with The Damn Crystals

| Album details | Peak positions |
| Album details | DEN |
|---|---|
| Pure McCartney: Year released: 2013; Record label: Mermaid Records | 13 |

Tim Christensen and Mads Langer

| Album details | Peak positions |
| Album details | DEN |
|---|---|
| Side Effects: Year released: 2014; Record label: RCA/Sony Music | – |

=== Singles ===
Tim Christensen solo

| Year | Single | Peak chart positions | | | Album |
| Year | Single | DEN | NED | NOR | Album |
|---|---|---|---|---|---|
| 2008 | "Superior" | 4 | 99 | 3 | Superior |
| 2009 | "Wonder of Wonders" | 15 | — | 11 | Superior |
| 2011 | "Surprise Me" | 38 | — | 25 | Tim Christensen and The Damn Crystals |
| 2012 | "Happy Ever After" | — | — | 15 | Tim Christensen and The Damn Crystals |
| 2012 | "Far Beyond Driven" | — | — | 8 | Tim Christensen and The Damn Crystals |

- 2000: "Get the Fuck Out of My Mind" (promo), EMI
- 2000: "21st Century High" (radio version) / "21st Century High" (album version), EMI
- 2001: "Love Is a Matter of..." (promo), EMI
- 2001: "Love Is a Matter of..." / "Misty Mono" / "Get the Fuck Out of My Mind" (live), EMI
- 2001: "Watery Eyes" (promo), EMI
- 2001: "King's Garden" / "Prime Time", EMI
- 2002: "Right Next To the Right One" (promo), EMI
- 2003: "Whispering at the Top of My Lungs" (promo), EMI
- 2004: "How Far You Go" (promo), EMI
- 2004: "Jump the Gun" (promo), EMI
- 2004: "Surfing the Surface" (promo), EMI
- 2008: "Superior", Mermaid
- 2009: "Hard to Make You Mine", Mermaid
- 2009: "India", Mermaid
- 2009: "Tell Me What You Really Want", Mermaid

Tim Christensen and The Damn Crystals

- 2011: "Surprise Me", Mermaid / Sony Music
- 2012: "Happy Ever After", Mermaid / Sony Music
- 2012: "Far Beyond Driven", Mermaid / Sony Music

Tim Christensen and Mads Langer

| Year | Single | Peak chart positions | Album |
| Year | Single | DEN | Album |
|---|---|---|---|
| 2014 | "Bringing Back Tomorrow" | 3 | Side Effects |
| 2014 | "Fact-Fiction / Silverflame" | 25 | Side Effects |

=== Cover versions by other artists ===
- "Love is a Matter of..." from Secrets on Parade was covered by Will Young on his December 2003 album Friday's Child as "Love is a Matter of Distance".
- Maggie Chiang recorded "Right Next to The Right One" from Honeyburst in Chinese for her 2004 album Beautiful But Lonely. It is titled "Ni Bu Gong Ping" ("Unfair to You").
- Eason Chan had performed the song How far you go and changed it into Chinese version. In that version, the name is adapted as "sonata loneliness" (寂寞奏鳴曲), which was inside one of his albums,Black, white, grey, released in 2003.
- An Italian version of "Right Next to The Right One" titled "Giorni d'estate" ("Summer days") was recorded for Dolcenera's fourth album, Dolcenera nel paese delle meraviglie ("Dolcenera in Wonderland").
- Celine Dion covers "Right Next to The Right One" on her album Taking Chances (2007). Producer Christopher Neil requested the song to be played by Christensen to retain the original feel of the song, and Celine laid down the vocal track later on. Although not released as a single, it entered the Danish Singles Chart on 23 November 2007 at number 13, due to strong digital downloads.
- As a contestant to the first season of X Factor in 2008, Heidi Svelmøe Herløw sang "Whispering at the Top of My Lungs" in the first live show. She would reach third place.
- Auditioning for Voice: Danmarks største stemme on 2 December 2011, Noa Sophie sang "How Far You Go", and was accepted by three jury members.

== Awards ==
Dizzy Mizz Lizzy

- 1994 Danish group of the year (GAFFA Award)
- 1995 Danish group of the year (Danish Grammy)
- 1995 Danish newcomer of the year (Danish Grammy)
- 1995 Danish rock album of the year (Danish Grammy for Dizzy Mizz Lizzy)
- 1995 People's choice award (Danish Grammy)
- 1996 Danish live group of the year (GAFFA Award)
- 1997 Danish live group of the year (GAFFA Award)
- 1997 Danish rock album of the year (Danish Grammy for Rotator)
- 1997 Danish producer of the year (Danish Grammy for Nick Foss for Rotator)
- 2016 Danish album of the year (GAFFA Award for Forward in Reverse)
- 2016 Danish rock album of the year (GAFFA Award for Forward in Reverse)
- 2021 Danish rock album of the year (GAFFA Award for Alter Echo)
- 2021 Songwriter of the year (GAFFA Award)

Tim Christensen solo

- 2000 Singer of the year (GAFFA Award)
- 2000 Newcomer of the year (GAFFA Award)
- 2003 Singer of the year (GAFFA Award)
- 2004 Danish DVD of the year (GAFFA Award for Live at Abbey Road Studios 2004)
- 2004 Danish album of the year (Danish Grammy for Honeyburst)
- 2004 Danish singer of the year (Danish Grammy)
- 2004 Danish producer of the year (Danish Grammy for Honeyburst, shared with Rune Nissen-Petersen)
- 2015 IFPI's Ærespris (Danish Grammy, Honorary Award)

Tim Christensen and Mads Langer

- 2014 Danish band of the year (GAFFA Award)
- 2014 Danish rock album of the year (GAFFA Award for Side Effects)
