= The EP Series, Volume 1: Acoustic Covers =

Studio album by Tim Christensen
- Released: 17 December 2012; 20 February 2013 (Japan)
- Recorded: September 2012; STC Studios (Copenhagen)
- Genre: Acoustic
- Length: 16:51
- Label: Mermaid Records Denmark; Sony Music Denmark Sony Music Japan
- Producer: Tim Christensen, Frank Birch Pontoppidan

Tim Christensen chronology
Tim Christensen and The Damn Crystals (2011)	The EP Series, Volume 1: Acoustic Covers (2012)	Pure McCartney (2013)

The EP Series, Volume 1: Acoustic Covers is an EP by Danish singer-songwriter Tim Christensen, released on 17 December 2012 as a music download and as a numbered 10" vinyl record, limited to 1000 copies. A Japanese CD version with three bonus tracks was released on 20 February 2013.

== Overview ==
In 2011–2013, Christensen recorded himself singing and playing guitar, using the built-in microphone and webcam of his laptop. These are known as the "Low Key/Late Night-sessions", referring to the low audio and video quality of the videos, and the time of recording, which was usually in the small hours of the night. The recordings were predominantly of Christensen's material (released and unreleased), but also included a few cover versions, including "How Am I Supposed to Live Without You".

Inspired by these performances, Christensen recorded six cover songs in a very minimalistic and intimate way, featuring only Christensen singing and playing acoustic guitar. The last song is a duet with Irish singer-songwriter Gemma Hayes.

== Reception ==
Professional ratings
Review scores
Source	Rating
GAFFA	4/6 stars
Lydtapet.net	4/6 stars

The EP received few reviews, but the reviews that were written were moderately positive. One reviewer puts it as, "There is truly a 'campfire-deluxe' atmosphere over these takes on songs, that don't whip the carpet out from under the listener, but that surely do not irritate." Another review concludes with the words: "This EP is not a major release, but it is exactly what the title suggests. A nice little interlude, recorded without the heavy pressure of expectations that usually surrounds a Tim Christensen release."

== Track listing ==
Side one
No.	Title	Writer(s)	Length
1.	"Shot in the Dark"	Ozzy Osbourne, Phil Soussan	2:39
2.	"Enjoy the Silence" (originally performed by Depeche Mode)	Martin Gore	2:32
3.	"Next To Me"	Emeli Sandé, Hugo Chegwin, Harry Craze	3:18

Side two
No.	Title	Writer(s)	Length
4.	"Hunting High and Low" (originally performed by a-ha)	Pål Waaktaar	2:11
5.	"How Am I Supposed to Live Without You"	Michael Bolton, Doug James	3:14
6.	"A Way to Say Goodbye"	Mike Viola	2:57

Japan bonus tracks
No.	Title	Writer(s)	Length
7.	"Oh My Love"	John Lennon, Yoko Ono
8.	"Happy Xmas (War Is Over)"	Lennon, Ono
9.	"Blackbird" (originally performed by The Beatles)	Lennon, Paul McCartney

== Personnel ==
Tim Christensen and The Damn Crystals

- Tim Christensen – lead vocals, guitars, record producer
- Gemma Hayes – vocals (on "A Way to Say Goodbye")

Production

- Frank Birch Pontoppidan – engineer and mixer
- Kaal Odium – additional engineering
- Paul Wilson – artwork
