= Pure McCartney =

Pure McCartney may refer to:

- Pure McCartney (2013 album), a live album by singer-songwriters Tim Christensen, Mike Viola, and Tracy Bonham, with the band The Damn Crystals, recorded for Paul McCartney's 70th birthday
- Pure McCartney (Paul McCartney album), a compilation album released by Paul McCartney in 2016
