= Live at Abbey Road =

Live at Abbey Road may refer to:

- Live at Abbey Road, a 1982 live album by The Shadows
- Live at Abbey Road Studios 2004, a live album by Tim Christensen

== See also ==
- Live from Abbey Road, a British performance/documentary television series
