= Superior (album) =

Studio album by Tim Christensen
- Released: 24 November 2008
- Recorded: 2007/2008; Grapehouse studio (Copenhagen)
- Genre: Rock
- Length: 46:57
- Label: Mermaid, PIAS
- Producer: Tim Christensen; Rune Nissen-Petersen; Nick Foss (executive)

Tim Christensen chronology
Live at Abbey Road Studios 2004 (2004)	Superior (2008)	Tim Christensen and The Damn Crystals (2011)

Superior is the third studio album by Danish singer-songwriter Tim Christensen, released on 24 November 2008 on CD, limited edition Digipak CD/DVD which includes a 30-minute making-of, and a double vinyl box set which also includes the CD and DVD, as well as an outsize poster.

== Overview ==
Superior was the first album to be released on Mermaid Records after Sony Music Entertainment Denmark became the label's main shareholder. To date, it is the only studio album in Christensen's musical career without a separate Japanese bonus release.

The title song "Superior" has Christensen opening up about himself. According to the press release, "The song Superior pins Christensen down on a more personal level: what kind of thoughts are running through his mind? What concerns him? In the revealing lyrics, the popular songwriter stands naked. He’s brutally honest and vulnerable. (...) The song is all about refusing to let yourself be controlled by what people expect of you, but rather trusting your own gut feeling and believing that you’re good enough the way you are. Be it in your career or in love." It also refers to having to deal with the expectations people had of him since his previous album: "[D]uring work on Superior, he’s felt the huge success of Honeyburst as a burden pressing down on his shoulders."

"Wonder of Wonders" is the first song Christensen has written on piano. "India" was written in his sleep; he woke up, recorded a basic version, and was back to sleep in under 20 minutes. The riff of "Follow My Lead" is played on a baritone guitar, which according to Christensen is "probably the most unsexy guitar there is, but it sounds great." "Song for Shelly" was written for his former girlfriend, Michelle Djarling.

A song named "Sooner or Later" did not make it onto the album, but was included on the Japanese edition, to be released on 26 September 2012. On 9 November 2011, Christensen recorded this song as part of his "low key late night sessions".

== Reception ==
It received mixed reviews, but to keep the audience from thinking it largely got bad reviews, Mermaid Records decided to cite all reviews, good and bad. This was even taken further by using some of these phrases on T-shirts, such as ugens flødebolle ("this week's cream puff). It was voted the Melodic.net best album of 2008. It took until 7 December 2009 before it was released in the Netherlands on PIAS Recordings.

Four songs off the album were released as a single: "Superior" (2008), "Hard To Make You Mine" (2009), "India" (2009), and "Tell Me What You Really Want" (2009). The latter video was made by Paul "Yellow1" Wilson, who also did the cover art for this album.

== Track listing ==
All music is composed by Tim Christensen.

Superior
No.	Title	Writer(s)	Length
1.	"One of These Days"	Tim Christensen, Mike Viola	0:49
2.	"Hard to Make You Mine"	Christensen	3:42
3.	"Superior"	Christensen, Viola	3:46
4.	"Wonder of Wonders"	Christensen, Winther-John	4:04
5.	"Two Is a Crowd"	Christensen, Winther-John	3:22
6.	"India"	Christensen	4:35
7.	"As I Let You In"	Christensen	3:45
8.	"Tell Me What You Really Want"	Christensen	3:59
9.	"Love Rears Its Ugly Head"	Christensen	4:07
10.	"Song for Shelly"	Christensen	4:37
11.	"Follow My Lead"	Christensen	6:15
12.	"Maggie My Dear"	Christensen	4:01
Total length:			46:57

Japan bonus track
No.	Title	Length
14.	"Sooner or Later" (The Japanese edition also includes the bonus DVD)

Limited edition bonus DVD

The Making of Superior DVD^{[*]}
No.	Title	Length
1.	"The Making of Superior^{[I]}" (documentary)	29:08

^* The disc itself is named PERFEKTIONIST_DVD, referring to the lyrics "I'm a bit of a perfectionist" in the title track of Superior.

^I Credits: Theis Molin (director, producer), Christoffer Dreyer (editor, producer), Lars Bonde (director of photography), © 2008 tmfilm.dk.

== Personnel ==
- Tim Christensen – vocals, guitars, bass, drums, producer
  Additional instruments: tenor guitar, acoustic baritone guitar, mandolin, piano, Mellotron, Minimoog, Wurlitzer electric piano, Fender Rhodes, Fender Rhodes Piano Bass, keyboards, glockenspiel, vibraphone, dulcimer

Additional musicians

- Olaf Olsen – drums (on tracks 3, 5, 6, 8, 11, and 12)
- Laust Sonne – drums (on track 9)
- Christoffer Møller – string arrangement
- Prague Philharmonic Orchestra – strings
- Jan Chalupecky – conductor

Production

- Nick Foss – executive producer
- Rune Nissen-Petersen – producer, engineer, mixer
- Nikolaj Vinten – mastering
- Paul Wilson – designer, artwork, photography
- Helene Hasen – photography
- Dan Christensen – front cover photo
