= Live at Abbey Road Studios 2004 =

Live album by Tim Christensen
- Released: 4 November 2004
- Recorded: 3 September 2004; Abbey Road Studios, London
- Genre: Rock
- Length: c. 2:50:00
- Label: EMI; TMFilm; K_G

Tim Christensen chronology
Honeyburst (2003)	Live at Abbey Road Studios 2004 (2004)	Superior (2008)

Live at Abbey Road Studios 2004 is a live 2CD and limited edition DVD/2CD and vinyl record by Danish singer-songwriter Tim Christensen, released in 2004. It is the first officially released live solo recording of Christensen. The DVD appeared only in limited numbers and is now a rare item.

== Overview ==
Live at Abbey Road Studios 2004 contains a recording of the final show of the Honeyburst tour, held on 3 September 2004 in Studio 1 of the Abbey Road Studios, marking the 10-year-anniversary of Christensen's professional career as a musician, which was made possible by the success of his 2003 album Honeyburst. Additionally, the band had a really good year and was on a roll, so Christensen was happy to have it documented.

Christensen explains: "Originally we were just supposed to do a few shows in London to a few representatives of the music business. But instead of playing at some kind of boring club, we decided we would play at Abbey Road. Only later did we decide to record it and release it to DVD." By the time the day of the recording had arrived, Christensen found recording the show outweighed impressing the audience with the possibility of being promoted worldwide, although the latter would be nice. Christensen's record label wanted to use the concert to showcase Honeyburst to several of their executives across Europe, although it is not known whether there were any present. Another reason for the concert was that Christensen's contract would be running out half a year later, meaning they were looking for something nice to do before negotiations started. The Abbey Road Studios were chosen was because of Christensen's intense love for The Beatles, and in part was to make up for the disappointment Christensen experienced recording Rotator there in 1995–96, this time making it a proper homage to The Beatles, of whom Christensen has always been a big fan.

The concert was composed of two sets; one with full band, one unplugged. The setlists contained songs from the two solo albums that had been released by then, Secrets on Parade (2000) and Honeyburst (2003), as well as from the eponymous debut album of Christensen's former band, Dizzy Mizz Lizzy (1994). The DVD includes interview and backstage footage, as well as the documentary "Tim Christensen: From Roskilde to Abbey Road" by the Danish film maker Theis Molin, which follows Christensen and band from their 2004 performance on the Green Stage of the Roskilde Festival to the show at the Abbey Road Studios. This music DVD was released in a time when the DVD market in Denmark was just starting to develop, whereas in other countries this was already an established market.

== Track listing ==
All lyrics by Tim Christensen, except where noted.

All tracks are written by Tim Christensen

Disc One: The Concert
No.	Title	Length
1.	"Jump the Gun"	3:16
2.	"Isolation Here I Come"	4:08
3.	"Secrets on Parade" (Lyrics: Christensen / Marcus Winther-John)	4:37
4.	"Let's Face It" (Lyrics: Christensen / Winther-John)	3:54
5.	"Don't Leave Me but Leave Me Alone" (Lyrics: Christensen / Winther-John)	9:55
6.	"Surfing the Surface"	4:36
7.	"Love is a Matter of..."	3:06
8.	"Whispering at the Top of My Lungs"	4:59
9.	"Get the Fuck out of My Mind" (Lyrics: Christensen / Winther-John)	7:53
10.	"Screaming at the Top of My Lungs"	2:12
11.	"Caterpillar"	9:01
12.	"Love is a Loser's Game"	3:06
13.	"Right Next to the Right One"	5:12
14.	"Time is the Space Between Us" (Lyrics: Christensen / Winther-John)	4:47
Total length:		1:10:07

Disc Two: Extra Acoustic Session
No.	Title	Length
1.	"No Easy Key"	4:01
2.	"Lost and Found" (Lyrics: Christensen / Winther-John)	3:03
3.	"King's Garden" (Lyrics: Christensen / Winther-John)	3:35
4.	"Barbedwired Baby's Dream"	2:41
5.	"How Far You Go"	3:08
Total length:		16:28

Limited edition bonus DVD

Tim Christensen
No.	Title	Length
1.	"The Concert" (track listing as disc 1)	1:10:07
2.	"Tim Christensen: From Roskilde to Abbey Road" (documentary)	46:47
3.	"Bonus features" (interview, behind the scenes, Extra Acoustic Session [track listing as disc 2], credits)

== Personnel ==
Band

- Tim Christensen – lead vocals, guitars, graphic design
- Lars Skjærbæk – guitars, Mellotron, backing vocals
- Nicolai Munch-Hansen – bass guitar
- Olaf Olsen – drums

Additional crew

- Dan Christensen – graphic design
- Rune Nissen-Petersen – executive producer
- René Cambony – A&R
- Christian Odd – product manager

Live at Abbey Road post-production

- René Szczyrbak – film producer
- Bente Mikkelsen – production manager
- Jesper Bøjlund (STV Television) – line producer
- Morgens Zender – technical coordinator
- Søren Hansen – technical coordinator
- Sara Bruun – assistant
- Thomas Argiris – assistant
- Uffe Egeberg – editor
- Eystein Jakobsen – editor
- Adam Bendixen – editor, vision mixer
- Jakob Kahlen – graphics
- David Moritz – DVD authoring
- Peter Aagaard – sound mixer bonus material

Live at Abbey Road recording

- Anders-Christian Dahl – camera operator
- Uffe Egeberg – camera operator
- Preben Hjorth – camera operator
- Kim Refslund – camera operator
- Carsten Horsted – camera operator
- Christian Puggaard – steadicam
- Michael Petersen – focus puller
- Gawian Kamelarczyk – camera assistant

Live at Abbey Road crew

- Finn Jansen – live sound engineer
- Mads Nørregaard – monitor sound engineer
- Jonas Jacobsen – backline technician
- John Henry's Ltd – stagehands
- CrewCo – stagehands
- Woodlands (Worchestershire) Ltd – generators
- Kasper Christiansen – lighting designer
- Jacob Bækmand – lighting crew, rigger
- Jonas Ritz – lighting crew, rigger
- Nils Laursen – lighting crew, rigger
- Frans Andersen – lighting crew, rigger
- Stine Hein (PDH) – live production
- Nicci Welsh – make-up artist
- Gitte Gammelgaard – still photographer
- Thomas Holm Jørgensen – journalist bonus material

From Roskilde to Abbey Road crew and post-production

- Theis Molin – director, producer
- Christoffer Dines Dreyer – editor
- Anders Vadgaard Christensen – online/colourist
- Simon Levin – batch
- Niklas Schak (Greatmusic) – sound post-production

From Roskilde to Abbey Road recording

- SR P3-Live (Brodin, Jonsson & Ohde) – concert recording
- Lars Bonde – director of photography
- Thomas Papapetros – concert photographer
- Henrik Bloch – concert photographer
- Troels Kampmann – concert photographer
- Nis Bysted Andersen – concert photographer
- Peter Lassen – concert photographer
- Eline Sørensen – concert photographer
- Theis Molin – concert photographer, still photographer
- Christoffer Dines Dreyer – concert photographer
- Anders Vadgaard Christensen – concert photographer
- Claus Christensen – still photographer
- Gitte Gammelgaard – still photographer
