= Side Effects (EP) =

Danish rock EP by Mads Langer & Tim Christensen

EP by Mads Langer & Tim Christensen
- Released: July 19, 2014
- Recorded: 2014 at Apparat Studio (tracks 1–4) and Medley Studio (track 5) in Copenhagen
- Genre: Pop rock
- Length: 22:09
- Label: RCA, Sony Music
- Producer: Mads Langer, Tim Christensen, Søren Balsner (tracks 1–4); Søren Mikkelsen (track 5)

Mads Langer chronology
In These Waters (2013)	Side Effects (2014)	Reckless Twin (2016)

Tim Christensen chronology
Pure McCartney (2013)	Side Effects (2014)

Singles from Mads Langer & Tim Christensen
- 1. "Bringing Back Tomorrow" Released: June 2, 2014; 2. "Fact-Fiction / Silverflame" Released: 2014

Side Effects is an EP by the Danish singer-songwriters Mads Langer and Tim Christensen, released on July 19, 2014, through RCA and Sony Music Denmark. The EP was awarded the "Danish rock album of the year", while the collaboration garnered the duo a GAFFA Award for "Danish rock band of the year".

== Background ==
Christensen and Langer first met during the 2006 Danish Music Awards. Langer opened for several of Christensen's shows in 2009, and they collaborated on the song "Say No More", which was released on Langer's eponymous album that same year.

In March 2014, it was announced that Langer and Christensen would perform together during the Grøn Koncert tour in July 2014. The EP was created with these performances in mind. After an acoustic set, they were joined on stage by bassist Søren Balsner of Carpark North and drummer Birk Nevel. In addition to the songs from Side Effects, they played songs from the repertoires of both Christensen and Langer.

Langer and Christensen wrote four new songs for the EP, and added a mashup of Langer's 2008 song "Fact-Fiction" and the 1993 hit "Silverflame" by Christensen's band Dizzy Mizz Lizzy, which was first played in the DR3 show DR3 Popper Op on February 16, 2013. "Bringing Back Tomorrow" was released as a single on June 2, followed by "Fact-Fiction / Silverflame".

== Track listing ==
All lyrics are written by Tim Christensen, Mads Langer and Marcus Winther-John (except where noted); all music is composed by Christensen and Langer (except where noted).

Side Effects
No.	Title	Length
1.	"Bringing Back Tomorrow"	3:49
2.	"Chasing Comets"	2:49
3.	"Strangers" (lyrics by Christensen & Langer)	4:21
4.	"Side Effects"	6:51
5.	"Fact-Fiction / Silverflame" (lyrics and music by Langer & Kristian Ottestad / Christensen)	4:17
Total length:		22:09

== Personnel ==
Musicians

- Mads Langer – vocals, guitars, keyboards (on tracks 1–4)
- Tim Christensen – vocals, guitars, Mellotron (on track 2), bass (on track 4)
- Søren Balsner – bass (on tracks 1–3), keyboards (on tracks 1–4), programming (on tracks 1–4)
- Bengt Lagerberg – drums (on track 1)
- Birk Nevel – drums (on tracks 2–4)

Production

- Søren Balsner – Record producer (tracks 1–4), engineer (tracks 1–4), mixer (tracks 1–2)
- Mads Langer & Tim Christensen – co-producer (tracks 1–4)
- Søren Mikkelsen – producer (track 5), engineer (track 5), mixer (tracks 3–5)
- Anders Schumann – mastering (tracks 1, 2 and 4, at Studio C4 in Copenhagen)
- Björn Engelmann – mastering (tracks 3 and 5, at Cutting Room in Stockholm)
- Paul Wilson – artwork
