= Mads Langer =

Danish singer-songwriter (born 1984)

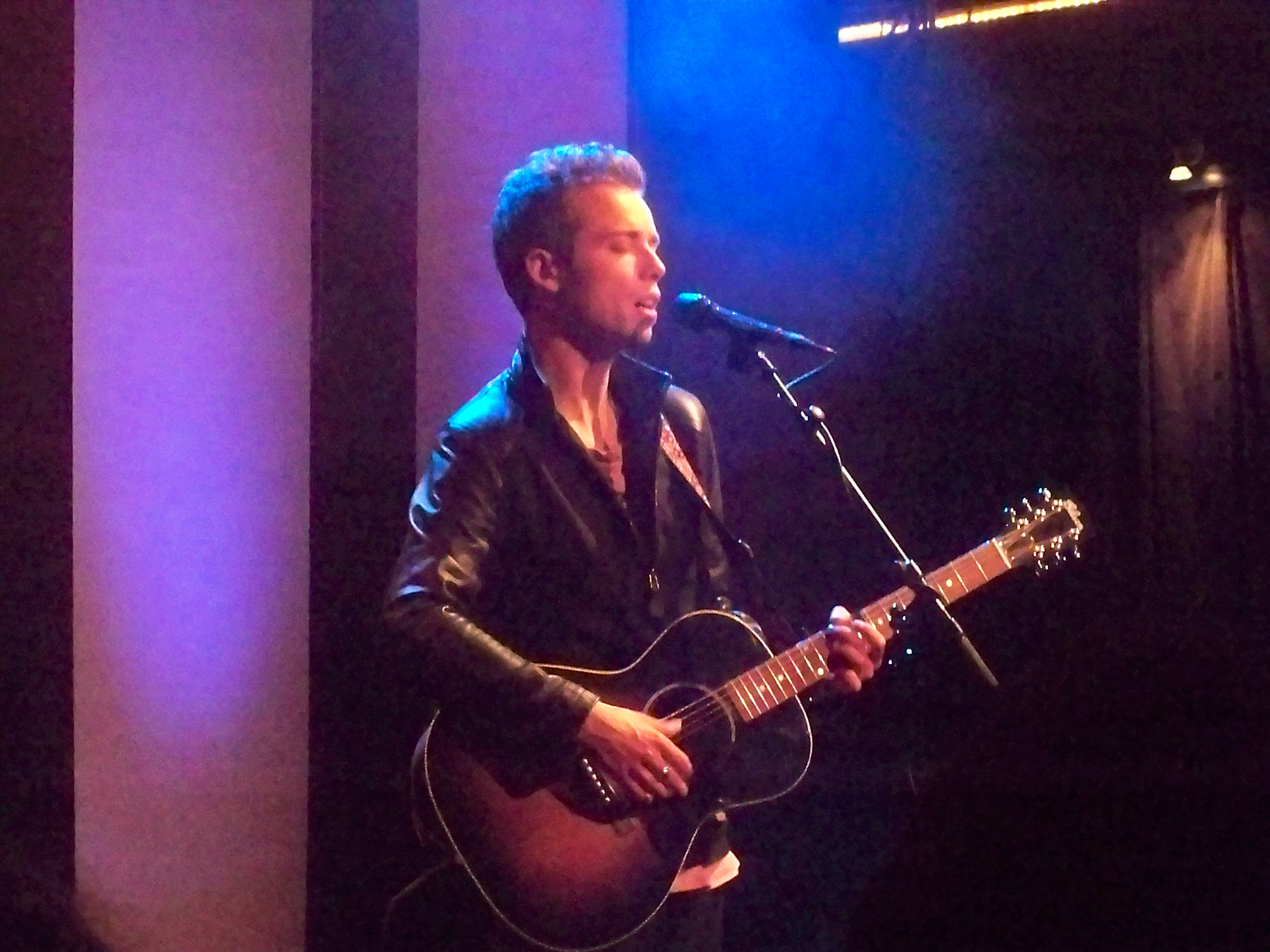
- Mads Langer performing an acoustic set in Amsterdam in 2010

Background information
- Born: 14 January 1984 (age 42); Aabenraa, Denmark
- Origin: Skive, Denmark
- Genres: Pop; rock
- Occupations: Singer; songwriter; multi-instrumentalist
- Instruments: Vocals; guitar; piano; keyboard; Mellotron
- Years active: 2005–current
- Labels: Copenhagen Records (2005–2009); Sony Music (2010–present)
- Website: www.madslanger.com

Mads Lillelund Langer (né Langer Clausen; born 14 January 1984) is a Danish singer-songwriter, who became internationally known for his cover of "You're Not Alone" by the British band Olive. He is a multi platinum artist in his home country of Denmark.

== Early life ==
Mads Lillelund Langer Clausen was born on 14 January 1984 in Aabenraa, but when he was three years old, he and his family moved to Skive where he grew up. Here, he developed an early interest in the piano and drums in his childhood home. He began playing piano at age 3 and writing songs at age 8. He continued his musical interest at Skive Music School, where Dúné and Søren Balsner from Carpark North also studied. He also attended Frijsenborg Efterskole.

After graduating from Skive Gymnasium, Langer moved to Copenhagen in 2003, where he played in jam sessions and got to know many musicians. But his path into the music industry came when he returned home to Skive to be a judge in a local music competition. There, he met the band Kashmir's then manager, Brian Nielsen, and played some of his songs for him. This led to a contract with the record label Copenhagen Records in 2006.

== Career ==
Langer's first single, "Breaking News", was released in October 2005 and became Ugens Uundgåelige (Unavoidable of the Week) on DR P3. In March 2006, his debut album Attention Please was released, produced by Søren Balsner, bassist of Carpark North. That same year, Langer played at the Spot Festival, where a talent scout had flown in to see him. The talent scout was enthusiastic, and at his urging, Langer moved to New York and Los Angeles for a period.

At the end of 2007, Langer moved back to Denmark and became musical director at Nørrebros Theater, which staged the rock odyssey Hedwig and the Angry Inch with Anders W. Berthelsen in the lead role.

While in New York and Los Angeles, he wrote his self-title second album, Mads Langer, which was released in February 2009 and includes the song "Fact-Fiction", which was written by Langer and Norwegian songwriter Boots Ottestad, and the song became a minor hit. During that same period, Langer toured with Tim Christensen, where Langer was the opening act. As of May 2011, Mads Langer has sold close to 20,000 copies.

In early 2009, Langer moved to London, where he began working with manager Sue Whitehouse, who had previously managed British band The Darkness. In December 2009, he released a cover version of British trip hop band Olive's "You're Not Alone". The song went gold in both Denmark and Italy, reached number one on the airplay charts in Italy and Switzerland, was in the top five in the Netherlands for both sales and airplay, and spent five months on the German airplay chart. In Denmark, "You're Not Alone" was the most played song on DR P3 and DR P4 in 2011.

In July 2010, Langer signed an international contract with Sony Music, which included the release of three albums in Europe and the US. His first album with Sony Music was Behold, released in May 2011, produced by Søren Balsner and Martin Terefe, among others. The album went gold in Denmark and includes the singles "Microscope" and "Riding Elevators". The former was played regularly during the breaks at FC Barcelona's home games for a period, along with "You're Not Alone", while the latter became "Song of the Week" on BBC2. The deluxe edition of Behold has been certified double platinum for its sales in Denmark. Following the release of Behold, Langer embarked on an extensive European tour with sold-out concerts in several major cities.

In 2011, Langer sang a duet with Norwegian singer Maria Mena on her song "Habits", featured on her album Viktoria, which was released in September of that year, and the two toured together. Langer also appeared with the British band Kasabian on a German TV show. In November 2011 and January 2012, Langer played two sold-out concerts at the DR Concert Hall.

In the fall of 2012, Langer participated in TV 2's music program Toppen af Poppen alongside Sanne Salomonsen, Nabiha, Johnson, Peter Belli, Kasper Winding and Dicte. Among other songs, he performed "Overgi’r mig langsomt" ("Surrender Me Slowly"), which he originally wrote for Sanne Salomonsen's hit album Unico. Langer's own version reached number one on iTunes and earned him a platinum record.

In March 2013, Langer released his fourth album, In These Waters. Some of the producers involved were the Swedish production team SeventyEight, and the album features the title track, which is a duet with the winner of X Factor Denmark, Ida Østergaard Madsen. The single "Elephant" reached number one on the Danish Bit Track chart. The album was followed by a sold-out tour of Denmark.

In 2013, Langer was the third most played composer in Denmark according to KODA. Langer's songs "The River Has Run Wild" and "Beauty of the Dark" have been used in the American supernatural television series The Vampire Diaries. The song "Fact-fiction" has been used in the American crime mystery television series Castle.

In 2014 and 2015, Mads Langer recorded new songs for his sixth album, Reckless Twin, which was released on 18 March 2016, featuring his hit single "3AM", released as the album's lead single on 28 December 2015, which he co-produced with Jamie Hartman. The album serves as a follow up to In These Waters. Langer said of the album, "I feel like I can learn a lot from my earliest material, because it was so pure. With the new album, I made a point of getting back to what I first loved about music: those moments where a song comes together and you don’t really know how it happened, and it just gives you the chills."

On 1 October 2021, Langer released his seventh album, Where Oceans Meet.

On 4 October 2024, Langer released his eight and first Danish-language album, Kærlighed & Frygt (Love & Fear).

== Personal life ==
On 29 June 2019, Langer married model Julie Lillelund, who is known from the Kanal 4 program Danmarks næste topmodel (Denmark's Next Top Model). The wedding took place at Engelsholm Castle near Vejle. After five years together, the couple divorced in July 2024.

== Discography ==
=== Studio albums ===
List of albums, with selected chart positions
Title	Album details	Peak chart positions	Certifications
Title	Album details	DEN	Certifications
Attention Please	Released: 17 March 2006; Label: Copenhagen Records; Formats: CD, digital download	—	
Mads Langer	Released: 9 February 2009; Label: Copenhagen Records; Formats: CD, digital download	12	DEN: Gold
Behold	Released: 9 May 2011; Label: Sony Music; Formats: CD, digital download	2	
Behold Deluxe	Released: 19 November 2012; Label: Sony Music; Formats: CD, digital download	2	DEN: Gold
In These Waters	Released: 10 May 2013; Label: Sony Music; Formats: CD, digital download	1	DEN: Platinum
Reckless Twin	Released: 18 March 2016; Label: Sony Music; Formats: CD, digital download	1	
Where Oceans Meet	Released: 1 October 2021; Label: Freedom Is a State of Mind; Formats: CD, digital download	24	
Kærlighed & Frygt	Released: 4 October 2024; Label: Freedom Is a State of Mind; Formats: CD, digital download	—	
"—" denotes releases that did not chart.

=== Live albums and EPs ===
- Fact-Fiction. Pop – or ??? (EP, 2008), Copenhagen Records
- Amstrdm EP (EP, 2011), Sony Music
- Side Effects (EP, 2014), Sony Music
- All the Time, Sometimes (EP, 2017)

=== Singles ===
List of singles, with selected chart positions
Year	Single	Peak chart positions		Certifications	Album
Year	Single	DEN	Other charts	Certifications	Album
2009	"Fact-Fiction"	17		Gold	Mads Langer
2009	"You're Not Alone"	17	AUT #41; BEL (Vl) #29 (Ultratip); BEL (Wa) #20 (Ultratip); IT #6; NED #52; SWI #32		Mads Langer
2012	"Microscope"	37	BEL (Vl) #29 (Ultratip)		Behold
2013	"Elephant"	4		Gold	In These Waters
2013	"Heartquake"	17			In These Waters
2013	"I en stjerneregn af sne"	1			TBA
2013	"No Gravity"	35			TBA
2014	"Bringing Back Tomorrow" (with Tim Christensen)	3			Side Effects
2014	"Fact-Fiction / Silverflame" (with Tim Christensen)	25			Side Effects
2015	"3 AM"	5			
2017	"Flawless"	16			All the Time, Sometimes
2018	"Tag mig med"	11			

Other charted or certified songs

List of singles, with selected chart positions
Year	Single	Peak chart positions	Certifications	Album
Year	Single	DEN	Certifications	Album
2012	"Overgir mig langsomt"	1	Platinum	Toppen af Poppen Vol. 3
2012	"Ikk hate"	15		Toppen af Poppen Vol. 3
2012	"København (Fra en DC 9)"	2		Toppen af Poppen Vol. 3
2012	"Deep Sleep"	22		Toppen af Poppen Vol. 3
2012	"Alle har en drøm"	7		Toppen af Poppen Vol. 3

Other singles (non-charting)

- 2005: "Breaking News"
- 2006: "Poem with No Rhyme"
- 2009: "Wake Me Up in Time"
- 2009: "Too Close" (with Mike Sheridan)
- 2009: "Last Flower"
- 2011: "Riding Elevators"
- 2012: "Something New"
