= Pure McCartney (2013 album) =

Live album by Tim Christensen, Mike Viola, Tracy Bonham, with The Damn Crystals
- Released: 12 February 2013
- Recorded: 18 June 2012; Vega, Copenhagen
- Genre: Rock
- Length: 1:25:58
- Label: Mermaid Records
- Producer: Tim Christensen, Frank Birch Pontoppidan

Tim Christensen chronology
The EP Series, Volume 1: Acoustic Covers (2012)	Pure McCartney (2013)	Side Effects (2014)

Mike Viola chronology
Acousto De Perfecto (2012)	Pure McCartney (2013)	GHOUL (2013)

Tracy Bonham chronology
Masts of Manhatta (2010)	Pure McCartney (2013)	Wax & Gold (2015)

Pure McCartney is a live DVD/CD and DVD/2-LP album by singer-songwriters Tim Christensen, Mike Viola, and Tracy Bonham, with the band The Damn Crystals, released in 2013.

== Overview ==
Pure McCartney contains a recording of a one-off tribute concert at Vega in Copenhagen in celebration of Sir Paul McCartney's 70th birthday that day.

Bassist Søren Koch once saw Viola play in New York, and thought that he had a strong musical match with Christensen, so he introduced the two. Christensen and Viola found out that the 1971 McCartney album Ram is their mutual favorite album, and the idea arose to hold a concert in honor of McCartney's 70th birthday on 18 June 2012. The set list consisted of songs from Ram alongside several other post-Beatles songs. Vega's large concert hall, with a capacity of 1,500, was sold out.

The concert was filmed and released eight months after the show on DVD/CD and DVD/2-LP, featuring artwork inspired by Ram by Paul "Yellow1" Wilson, who has previously done work on several other releases of Christensen and his band Dizzy Mizz Lizzy.

Noel Gallagher was planned to become a surprise guest. Christensen and Gallagher appeared on Danish television, where they were competing in a small quiz about The Beatles. They got along well with each other backstage and also talked about the McCartney concert, but they never heard back from Gallagher's manager.

== Track listing ==
All tracks are written by Paul & Linda McCartney, except where noted.

Pure McCartney
No.	Title	Writer(s)	Length
1.	"Too Many People"	Paul McCartney	4:34
2.	"3 Legs"	Paul McCartney	3:03
3.	"Ram On"	Paul McCartney	2:48
4.	"Dear Boy"		2:37
5.	"Uncle Albert/Admiral Halsey"		5:13
6.	"Smile Away"	Paul McCartney	4:09
7.	"Heart of the Country"		2:38
8.	"Monkberry Moon Delight"		4:42
9.	"Eat at Home"		3:37
10.	"Long Haired Lady"		7:07
11.	"The Back Seat of My Car"	Paul McCartney	5:20
12.	"Venus & Mars/Rock Show"		8:03
13.	"Coming Up"	Paul McCartney	4:14
14.	"Live and Let Die"		3:21
15.	"Maybe I'm Amazed"	Paul McCartney	4:44
16.	"Junk"	Paul McCartney	3:41
17.	"Band on the Run"		5:59
Total length:			1:16:31

DVD bonus featurette
No.	Title	Length
1.	"Bonus featurette"	9:27

== Personnel ==
Lead musicians

- Tim Christensen – lead vocals, guitars, producer, executive producer
- Mike Viola – lead vocals, piano, acoustic guitar, bric-à-brac
- Tracy Bonham – lead vocals, violin, percussion

The Damn Crystals

- Lars Skjærbæk – guitars, backing vocals, lead vocal on "Smile Away"
- Søren Koch – bass, backing vocals, additional lead vocal on "Rock Show" and "Coming Up"
- Christoffer Møller – keyboards, backing vocals, percussion, tenor horn
- Jesper Lind – drums

Live crew

- Paul Hammann – FOH engineer
- Daniel Devantier – monitor engineer
- Arild Nordgaard – guitar technician
- Vagn Olsen – drums and bass technician
- Jacob Bækmand – lighting engineer
- Mif Damgaard – head of production, tour manager

Recording, production and post-production

- Frank Birch Pontoppidan – producer, executive producer, mixer (at STC Studios)
- Max Christensen – producer, director
- Morten Fuks – film editor
- Mark Balstrup – color grade
- Paul Wilson – artwork, titles
- Nikolaj Vinten – mastering (at Supersonic Mastering)
- Mads Mølgaard Helbæk – audio engineer
- Sigurd Høyen – photographer
- Jørgen Bo Behrensdorff – photographer
- Mikkel Rise – photographer
- Mads Mølgaard Helbæk – photographer
- Frederik Trampe – photographer
- Morten Fuks – photographer
- Cecilie Bach Pedersen – photographer
- Benni Christiansen – photographer
