= Fault Lines (album) =

Studio album by Turboweekend
- Released: 25 June 2012
- Recorded: 2012
- Genres: Synthpop, pop rock, rock
- Label: EMI

Turboweekend chronology
Ghost of a Chance (2009)	Fault Lines (2012)	Share My Thunder (2015)

Fault Lines is a 2012 English language album by Danish band Turboweekend that was released 25 June 2012 on EMI. It hit #1 on Hitlisten, the official Danish Albums Chart in its first week of release.

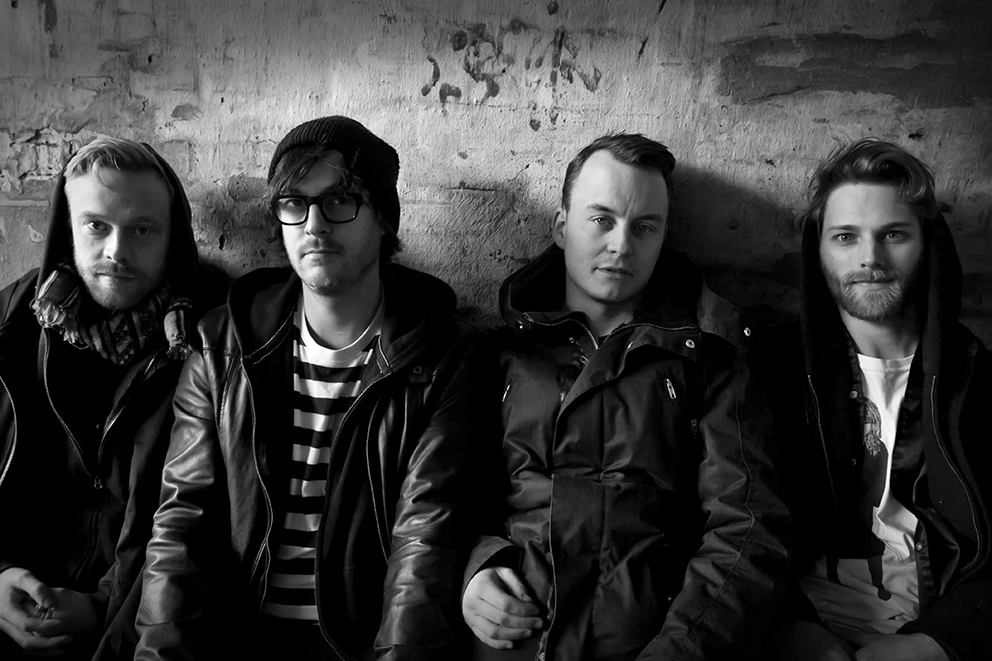
Turboweekend in 2012

On 30 April 2012, the band had pre-released the single "On My Side" in preparation for the release of the album.

== Track listing ==
No.	Title	Length
1.	"Fire of the Stampede"
2.	"Neverending"
3.	"Reflections on Chrome"
4.	"On My Side"
5.	"Boulevard"
6.	"Good Morning, It's Tomorrow"
7.	"You're the Cure"
8.	"Rubicon"
9.	"Drying Out in the Sun"
10.	"Douglas"
11.	"I Forgot"

== Charts ==
Chart (2009)	Peak position
Tracklisten	1
