= Electric Lady Lab =

Danish elektro-pop duo

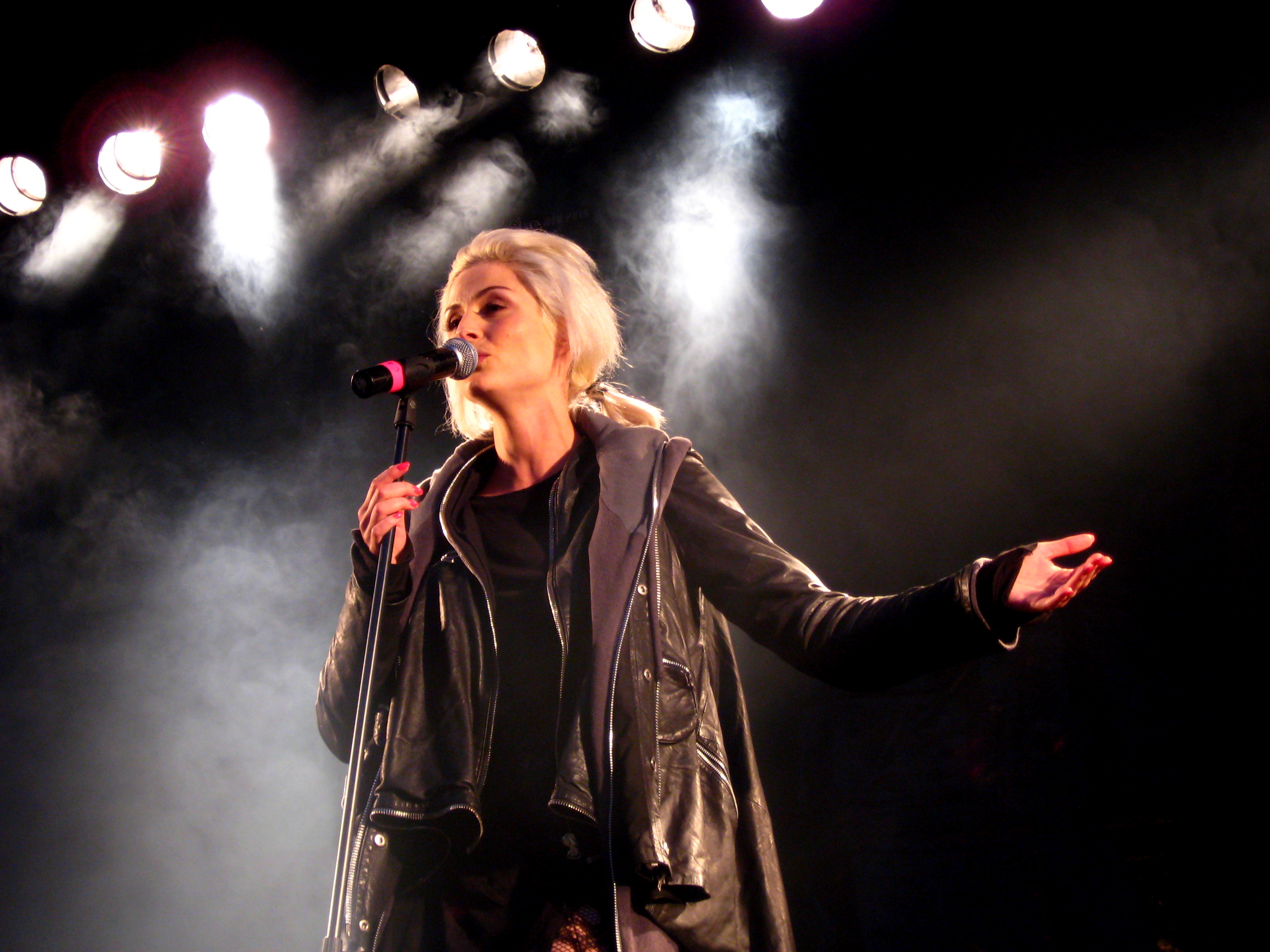
- Stine Hjelm Jacobsen, vocalist of Electric Lady Lab

Background information
- Genre: Electro-pop
- Years active: 2009–2016
- Labels: Mermaid Records, Sony Music
- Members: Martin Bøge Pedersen; Stine Hjelm Jacobsen

Electric Lady Lab was a Danish elektro-pop duo made up of producer and songwriter Martin Bøge Pedersen and vocalist Stine Hjelm Jacobsen. Electric Lady Lab was founded in March 2009. Their debut album Flash! was released on 7 January 2011. The duo is part of the new wave of modern Danish dance music. Electric Lady Lab broke up in March 2016.

== Career ==
The couple knew each other since the 1990s where they were attending the same school in Køge. Prior to Electric Lady Lab, Martin was alongside Jakob Weise Hellumpart part of the Danish pop duo The Loft, whereas Stine was part of the indie pop band NU with other band members being Peter Iversen, Lars Iversen and Morten Krog Helgesen.

Electric Lady Lab debuted with the single "It's Over Now" in November 2009, but got commercial breakthrough with "You & Me" released in June 2010 that sampled on "Rhythm Is a Dancer", a 1992 hit from the German eurodance group Snap!. The single has made it to #2 on the Hitlisten, the official Danish Singles Chart. It was also a hit in Norway, Germany, Switzerland and Austria.

September 2011 saw the release of "Touch Me", with sampling from a-ha's 1985 hit "The Sun Always Shines on TV". The song was composed with Johan Wohlert from The Storm and used the vocals of a-ha lead singer Morten Harket.

== Discography ==
=== Albums ===
Year	Album	Peak chart positions	Certification	Track listing
Year	Album	DEN	Certification	Track listing
2011	Flash!: Date of release: 7 January 2011; Record label: Mermaid Records	11		1. "Last Virgin Alive" (3:32); 2. "You & Me" (3:51); 3. "I Follow You" (3:41); 4. "Dancing with a Ghost" (3:38); 5. "Let Go" (3:17); 6. "Flash!" (3:57); 7. "Wondering" (3:38); 8. "Dangerous" (3:31); 9. "Fascinated" (3:54); 10. "Imagination" (3:25); 11. "It's Over Now" (3:39)

=== Singles ===
Year	Single	Peak chart positions	Certification	Album
Year	Single	DEN	Certification	Album
2009	"It's Over Now"	-		Flash!
2010	"You & Me"	2		Flash!
2010	"Wondering"	-		Flash!
2011	"Touch Me"	19		
2012	"Taking off"	31		
2012	"Alive" (Kato and Electric Lady Lab)	4		
2013	"Broken Mirrors" (featuring Sukker Lyn)	-		
2013	"Open Doors"	-		
2014	"Hurts"	18		
2016	"Love Is War"	-		
