= The Loft (Danish band) =

Danish musical group

- Origin: Copenhagen, Denmark
- Genres: Rock, Pop, Rap
- Years active: 1997 -
- Labels: Soul Music
- Members: Jakob Weise Hellum; Martin Bøge Pedersen
- Website: www.theloft.dk

The Loft is a Danish music and sampling group formed in 1997.

The members are Jakob Weise Hellum and Martin Bøge Pedersen. In Denmark they had a major hit with "City of Dreams" in 2004. The second single "Forever" became a minor hit. The duo's debut album was No Ordinary Man released in August 2004.

Their second album was Little Paul's BLVD in 2008, with single "Kiss You Goodbye" making it to the Top 20. There were two other releases, "Pussycat Lounge" and "Flaming Lips".

== Discography ==
=== Albums ===
All positions in parentheses in the Danish Albums Chart

- 2004: No Ordinary Man (#9)
- 2008: Little Paul's BLVD

=== Singles ===
All positions in parentheses in the Danish Singles Chart

- 2004: "City of Dreams" (#1)
- 2008: "Kiss You Goodbye" (#12)
