= Rasmus Nøhr =

Danish musician, composer, and guitarist (born 1972)

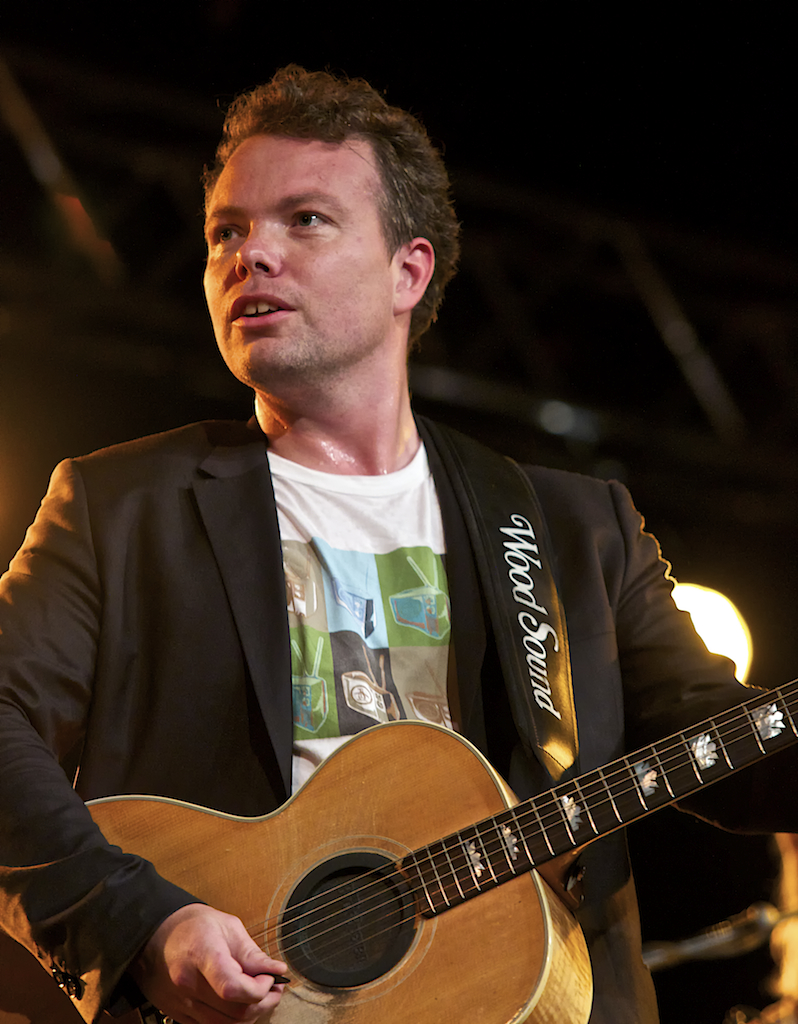
- Rasmus Nøhr performing at Skråen in Aalborg, Denmark. November 12, 2010

Background information
- Birth name: Rasmus Bensby Nøhr
- Born: March 7, 1972 (age 53); Copenhagen, Denmark
- Occupation(s): Singer, songwriter, musician
- Instrument(s): Vocals, guitar
- Years active: 2004–present
- Labels: Copenhagen (2004–2008); Mermaid (2004–present)
- Website: skrapperas.dk

Rasmus Bensby Nøhr (born 7 March 1972 in Copenhagen) is a Danish musician, composer, and guitarist. Nøhr has released six studio albums since his debut in 2004 and is known for having created the Danmark Dejligst festival.

== Career ==
Nøhr had his breakthrough in Denmark with the song Det glade pizzabud, a duet with Ida Corr. In 2004 he released his debut album, Rasmus Nøhr. In 2006 he released his second album, Lykkelig Smutning, which was soon followed by his 2008 album, I stedet for en tatovering (English: Instead of a tattoo).

He featured in Max Kestner's 2006 documentary/docu-comedy, Mig og dig (English: Me and you), about the difficult road to stardom and about the friendship between Rasmus Nøhr and Morten Holm. The film also features Gustav Hansen, Mik Christensen, and Nick Foss. The same year he was featured in an episode of Gennembrud, another TV documentary. On 27 July 2011, he appeared as principal feature in the Danish comedy series Vild med comedy. The show also included Simon Talbot as a comedy coach, Maria Erwolter, Thomas Evers Poulsen, and Jeppe Bruun Wahlstrøm.

In 2012, Nøhr created the festival called Danmark Dejligst, in an effort to perform in smaller places and cities that normally wouldn't have the opportunity to host music events. As part of the festival, he began playing for free in people's backyards across the country. By 2016, the festival had grown to consist of around 30 events from Skagen to Rødby. Each event included Rasmus Nøhr and other well-known musicians playing alongside local performers in addition to different activities arranged by the local communities.

During the COVID-19 pandemic, Nøhr drew controversy for spreading misinformation regarding COVID-19 and its vaccines.

== Discography ==
=== Albums ===
Year	Album	Peak position	Certification
Year	Album	DAN	Certification
2004	Rasmus Nøhr	21	Gold
2006	Lykkelig smutning	4	Platinum
2008	I stedet for en tatovering	7	
2010	Fra kæreste til grin	4	Gold
2011	Samlesæt Vol. 1: bedste sange 2000-2010 (live album)	3	Gold
2013	Retursekund	10	
2018	Monas Butik	16	

=== Singles ===
Year	Single	Peak position
Year	Single	DAN
2013	"Retursekund"	14

== Filmography ==
Documentaries

- 2006: Mig og dig - documentary — as himself
- 2006: Gennembrud in episode "Ataf Khawaja & Rasmus Nøhr" — as himself

Television

- 2011: Vild med comedy — episode "Rasmus Nøhr" as himself
