= Turboweekend =

Danish rock band

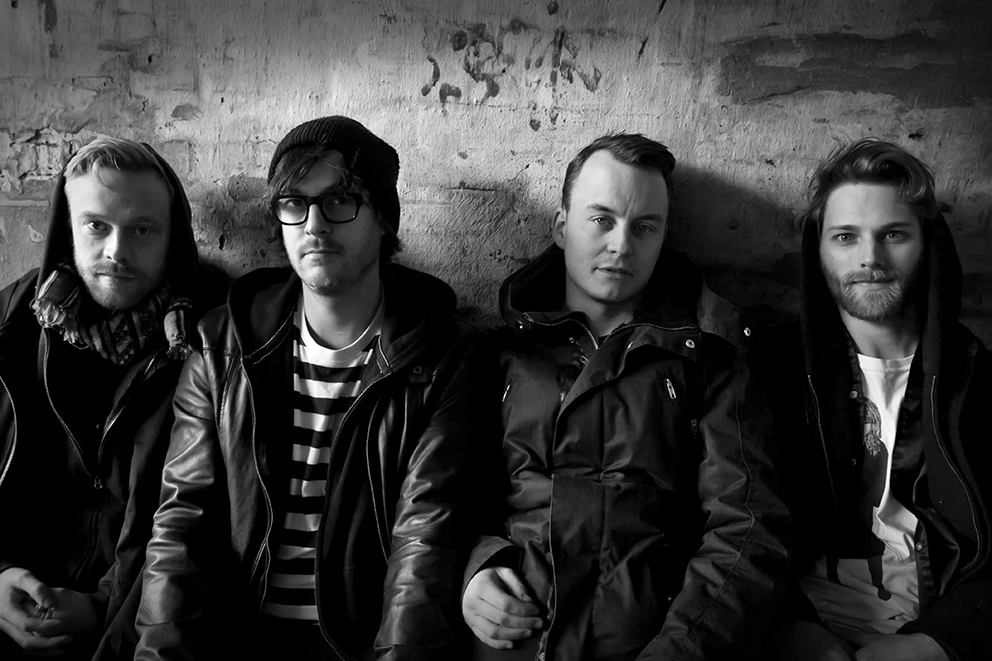
- Turboweekend in 2012. From left: Petersen, Øhlers, Møller and Bjerregaard

Background information
- Origin: Copenhagen, Denmark
- Genres: Alternative rock, synthpop, electronic rock
- Years active: 2006–present
- Labels: EMI Nordic, Mermaid/Sony, Copenhagen
- Members: Silas Bjerregaard; Martin Øhlers Petersen; Morten Køie; Anders Stig Møller
- Website: turboweekend.com

Turboweekend is a Danish synthesizer rock band, formed in 2006 by the three childhood friends Martin Øhlers Petersen, Silas Bjerregaard and Morten Køie. Anders Stig Møller joined the live shows in 2009, and was made official member in 2011 during the recordings of their latest studio album Fault Lines.

== Early achievements and Night Shift (2006–2008) ==
Morten, Martin and Silas formed their first band in 8th grade and in the following years played together in several different constellations before forming Turboweekend in late 2005. "Into You" the band's first radio hit, was recorded in early 2006, and Turboweekend played their debut concert in April that year. During 2006 the band became increasingly popular at the Copenhagen hipster parties, and was eventually booked for Roskilde Festival 2007. The debut album Night Shift was released on 1 October 2007 on Copenhagen Records. In 2008 the band played at Danish radio award show "P3 Guld" and was nominated as Newcomer of the Year at both "P3 Guld" and "Zulu Awards". That summer, their performance at Tivoli Gardens appeared in an episode of Rick Steves' Europe. In mid-2008 the band started working on their second album Ghost Of A Chance.

== Ghost of a Chance and the Bound EP (2009–2011) ==
Turboweekend's second album Ghost of a Chance was released on 23 March 2009 on Mermaid Records/Sony Music. Ghost of a Chance became the band's breakthrough record in their home country and nominated them for the main prize P3 Prisen at P3 Guld 2010. On 16 October 2009 Ghost of a Chance was released in Germany and Switzerland and in 2010 in Poland on Sony Music. The first single "Trouble Is" reached number 1 on the German college radio playlist. In the spring of 2010 Dutch DJ Tiësto's remix of "Trouble Is" was released worldwide.

In July 2010 the band played at Roskilde Festival again. At the same time "Trouble Is" hit number 1 on the Polish radio chart and at the end of the year it was the 8th most played track on the Polish radio station Eska Rock.

On 10 November 2010 the band released the free EP Bound via their webpage. Turboweekend was among the 5 nominees for MTV Europe Music Awards Best Danish Act at the show in Madrid in November 2010.

At P3 Guld on 14 January 2011 the band won the award P3 Breakthrough. The album Ghost of a Chance was certified Gold in January 2011 in Denmark. At the Danish Music Awards in November, Turboweekend won the award for Best Danish Live Act. Keyboard player Anders Stig Møller, who previously only had been hired as a live musician, became a part of the band, as they started working on songs for what would become their 3rd full length studio album Fault Lines.

== Fault Lines and the Shadow Sounds EP (2012–present) ==
In February 2012, Turboweekend signed a deal with EMI Nordic (now Parlophone), for the release of their 3rd full length studio album Fault Lines. In Denmark the album went #1 in the week of its release and first single On My Side was elected Hit Of The Year (shared 1st place) by listener votes on national radio P3. In April the band went on a 24-date European tour through The Netherlands, Germany, Austria, Switzerland and Poland and in March they released the Shadow Sounds ep containing stripped down versions of 6 songs from previous releases, which the band had rearranged for a small mini-tour in February at a handful of intimate venues. The European tour in April was followed up by a couple of festival shows in Switzerland, The Czech Republic, Hungary and Germany, as well as gigs in Denmark at Skive, Nibe, Trailerpark and Skanderborg festivals. The band is currently working on their 4th studio album.

== Festivals ==
- Roskilde Festival 2007, 2010
- Skanderborg Festival 2008, 2009, 2010, 2011, 2012, 2013, 2014, 2015, 2016, 2017, 2018
- NorthSide Festival 2010, 2011, 2012, 2014
- SPOT Festival 2008, 2009, 2010, 2013
- Skive Festival 2010, 2011, 2013
- Nibe Festival 2009, 2010, 2011, 2013, 2018
- By:Larm (Oslo) 2009, 2011, 2012
- Liverpool Soundcity 2009
- Volt Festival 2013
- Brücken Festival 2013
- Odjazdy Festival 2013

== Discography ==
=== Albums ===
Year	Album	Peak position	Certification
Year	Album	DAN	Certification
2007	Night Shift	—	
2009	Ghost of a Chance	19	Gold
2012	Fault Lines	1	
2015	Share My Thunder	7	
"—" denotes a recording that did not chart or was not released in that territory.

Others

- 2010: Ghost of a Chance (Deluxe Edition)

=== EPs ===
- 2010: Bound
- 2013: Shadow Sounds

=== Singles ===
Year	Single	Peak position	Album
Year	Single	DAN	Album
2010	"Trouble Is"	5	Ghost of a Chance
2012	"On My Side"	27	Fault Lines
2014	"Miles and Miles"	33	Share My Thunder

Others

- 2007: "Into You"
- 2007: "Wash Out"
- 2008: "Glowing Vision"
- 2008: "After Hours"
- 2009: "Something or Nothing"
- 2009: "Holiday"
- 2009: "Trouble Is" (Joker Remix)
- 2010: "Trouble Is" (Tiësto Remix)
- 2010: "Now"

== Awards and nominations ==
Year	Award	Category	Result
2011	Danish Music Awards	Best Danish Live Act	winner
2011	Danish Music Awards	Innovator Of The Year	nominee
2011	P3 Guld	P3 Breakthrough	winner
2010	Gaffa Awards	Danish Hit of the Year (Trouble Is)	winner
2010	MTV Europe Music Awards	Best Danish Act	nominee
2010	P3 Guld	P3 Prisen	nominee
2008	Zulu Awards	Newcomer of the Year	nominee
2008	P3 Guld	Newcomer of the Year	nominee
