= Honeyburst =

Studio album by Tim Christensen
- Released: 1 September 2003; 2004 (Netherlands)
- Recorded: 2002/2003; Grapehouse studio (Copenhagen); Lundgaard studios (Vejen)
- Genre: Rock
- Length: 53:31
- Label: EMI
- Producer: Tim Christensen; Rune Nissen-Petersen; Nick Foss (executive)

Tim Christensen chronology
Secrets on Parade (2000)	Honeyburst (2003)	Live at Abbey Road Studios 2004 (2004)

Honeyburst is the second studio album by Danish singer-songwriter Tim Christensen, released on 1 September 2003 on CD and vinyl. The vinyl edition of the album was re-released through the record label Parlophone on April 19, 2014.

== Overview ==
Christensen explains about the album: "It goes in a different direction from the previous albums. The music has gotten quieter as I get older and more mature. Occasionally songs will explode, but overall Honeyburst is more folkish, and has a little twinge of country." It contains quite a few ballads, about which Tim says, "they are far from trendy, and I don't mean that in a negative way. They are more classic and timeless and could just as well have been written 30 years ago, and will certainly also be written again 20 years from now."

All instruments were played by Christensen, except for some drums by Olaf Olsen or Laust Sonne and several bass tracks by Nicolai Munch-Hansen. Nina Forsberg sang backing vocals for Right Next To the Right One.

The cover was designed by Christensen and his father, Dan Christensen. It was based on a collage Dan Christensen made in 1966, before he went to art school, and was intended for a 1968 fashion show in Copenhagen, for which it was never used. He used faces of models from the fashion magazines that belonged to his then-girlfriend, who was a fashion designer. Christensen remembers it well from his childhood, when the collage hung in his father's bedroom. His father gave the collage to Christensen as a gift on 25 July 2012.

== Reception ==
Honeyburst was well received in Denmark, being the best selling album in the Danish Charts for two weeks, and selling over 130,000 copies in total. For the album, Christensen received three ZULU Awards and three Danish Music Awards for Danish album, singer and producer of the year, respectively.

== Songs ==
The song "Right Next To the Right One" was used as the title song for the Emmy Award winning DR1 drama series Nikolaj og Julie that was aired in 2002–2003. It became a national hit in 2002, a year ahead of Honeyburst's release. Christensen explains the match was made quickly: "The producer of the show called me, he said they liked what I was doing and wanted to know if I had a song they could use. At the time we had made demos one of which was "Right Next To the Right One". He told me what the series were about, and I said, 'I believe I have a good bid.' I think it fits well with the series, but it's important for me to tell that it is not their song; it wasn't taken from the series and used on my record, but it was taken from the record and used in the series." It was later also covered by several artists. Maggie Chiang covered it in 2004 as "Ni Bu Gong Ping" (Chinese for "Unfair to you") for her album Beautiful But Lonely (2004). In 2007, Celine Dion recorded it for her album Taking Chances, for which Christensen provided all instrument tracks. It has not been released as a single, but has entered the Danish Singles Chart on 23 November 2007 at number 13, due to strong digital downloads. An Italian version titled "Giorni d'Estate" ("Summer days") was recorded for Dolcenera's fourth album, Dolcenera nel paese delle meraviglie ("Dolcenera in Wonderland"). Although this was a lucrative deal for Christensen, it also gave people the impression that he made soft music. Christensen has also received many invites to play this song at weddings, which Christensen finds ironic because the line he started from was: "A pretty face can take you places you don't want to go." Christensen furthermore explained about the song: "Many believe it is about the only one, but for me, it is about being shy and daring to step out of my shell."

The second single, "Whispering at the Top of my Lungs", received heavy airplay on DR P3 in the summer of 2003. About the genesis of this song, Christensen explains that this was originally written as a heavy song, but it didn't really work. This version is frequently played as the shorter song "Screaming At the Top of My Lungs". The song was then recorded as a quiet ballad, but this too did not feel right. The final result was a bit of both, where quiet verses are dynamically alternated with strong choruses with full band. Live, Christensen plays this song entirely on electric guitar, but he uses an L.R. Baggs X-Bridge that allows him to make his guitar sound like an acoustic guitar.

The third single, "Jump the Gun", is the only song on the album that has no Mellotron on it. It is an older song that Christensen could not fit in anywhere before. "Lay Down Your Arms" is about not living for your own sake. It is written in a tradition taking after Christensen's great example The Beatles, especially the style of Paul McCartney, in such a straight way that it is nearly a nursery rhyme. "Isolation Here I Come" is about Christensen's tendency to flee when things get piles up. The isolation in this song is something negative, describing a state of being unable to deal with reality, even though it doesn't have to be so." "No Easy Key" is one of Christensen's favorites, in which he feels he stepped over his own limits as a songwriter. The lyrics "hint to the whole Popstars thing, or rather the people behind it." "Close the Door" contains guitar parts akin to those of George Harrison. The lyrics to "Don't Leave Me but Leave Me Alone" describe "the somewhat unnecessary distance I involuntarily experience with some of my audience. It is almost like the more established [the artist], the greater the distance. I notice that people are looking at me, but don't dare to come over, and this has gotten worse." "How Far You Go" is the only hidden track ever to appear on an album by Dizzy Mizz Lizzy or Tim Christensen because it was not added out of Christensen's free will: "It was a demo I had made, but I did not want to put it on the record because it was a little too heavy on the sentimental side, but the record company had not forgotten about it." It has a Don McLean like feel to it.

== Track listing ==
All lyrics by Tim Christensen, except where noted.

All tracks are written by Tim Christensen.

Honeyburst
No.	Title	Length
1.	"Intro"	0:48
2.	"Surfing the Surface"	4:14
3.	"Lost and Found" (Lyrics: Christensen / Marcus Winther-John)	3:10
4.	"Jump the Gun"	3:24
5.	"Whispering At the Top of My Lungs"	4:40
6.	"Lay Down Your Arms" (Lyrics: Christensen / Winther-John)	4:02
7.	"Right Next To the Right One"	4:11
8.	"Isolation Here I Come"	4:17
9.	"No Easy Key"	3:51
10.	"Close the Door"	3:21
11.	"Don't Leave Me but Leave Me Alone" (Lyrics: Christensen / Winther-John)	7:42
12.	"Tonight I'm Fine"	5:28
13.	"How Far You Go" (Hidden)	3:22
Total length:		53:31

Japan bonus track
No.	Title	Length
14.	"Fireglow"	2:45

Norway bonus track
No.	Title	Length
14.	"Love Is a Matter of..."	2:55

== Personnel ==
- Tim Christensen – vocals, guitars, bass, drums, Mellotron, producer, graphic design
  Additional instruments: Fender Rhodes Piano Bass, Hohner clavinet, Roland Jupiter-4, Crumar Stringer, Optigan, Drilldo guitar

Additional musicians

- Nicolai Munch-Hansen – bass (on tracks 4, 6, 10, 11, and 12)
- Olaf Olsen – drums (on tracks 4, 5, 6, 10, 11, and 12)
- Laust Sonne – drums (on track 8)
- Nina Forsberg – background vocals (on track 7)

Production

- Rune Nissen-Petersen – producer, engineer, mixer
- Nick Foss – executive producer
- Finn Jansen – basic-track consultancy
- Nikolaj Vinten – mastering
- Dan Christensen – graphic design, collage
- Gitte Gammelgaard – photography
