= Kira Skov =

Danish singer (born 1976)

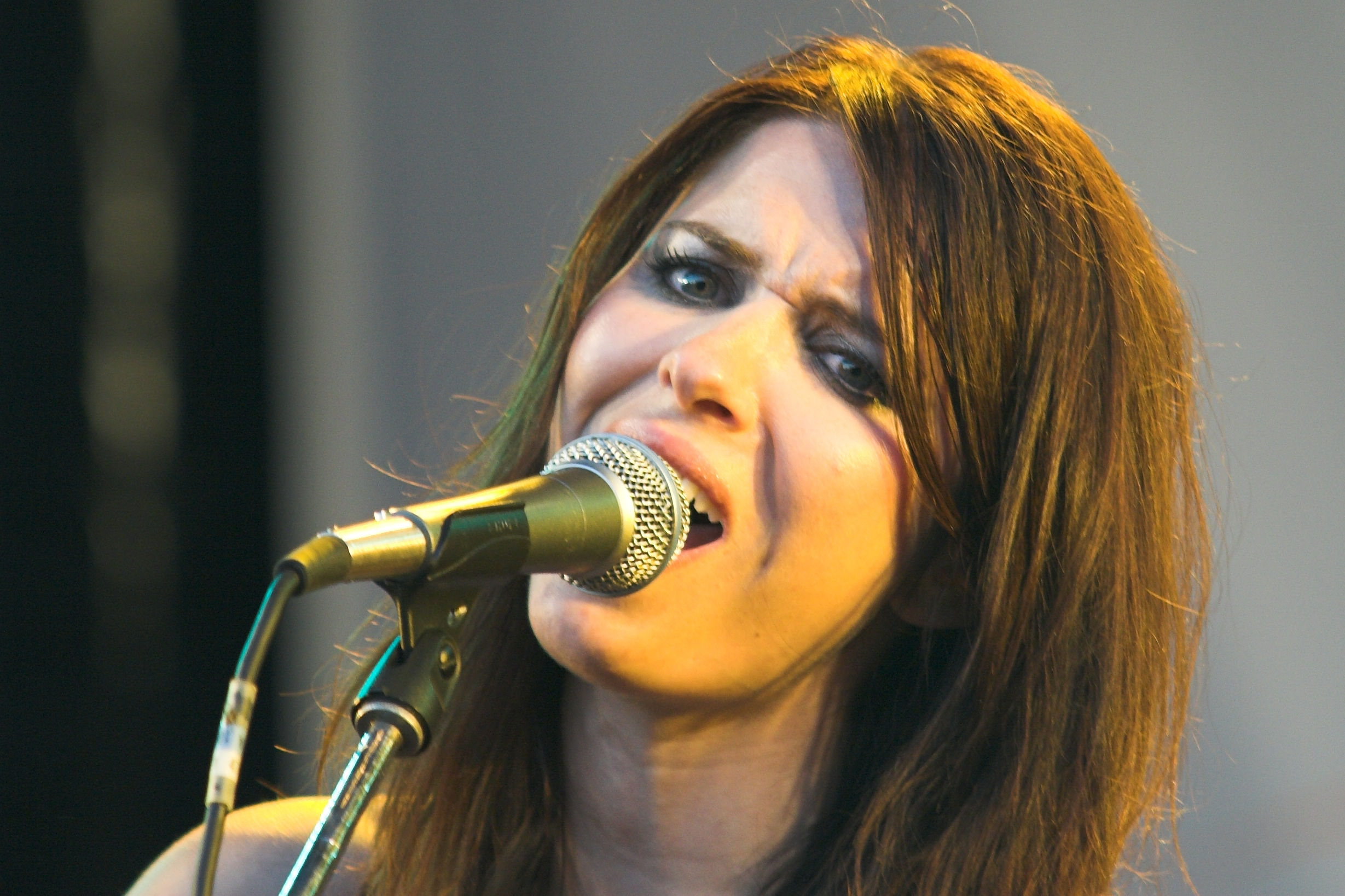

Background information
- Born: 6 June 1976 (age 49); Rødovre, Denmark
- Genres: Pop
- Years active: 1993–present
- Website: www.kiramusic.com

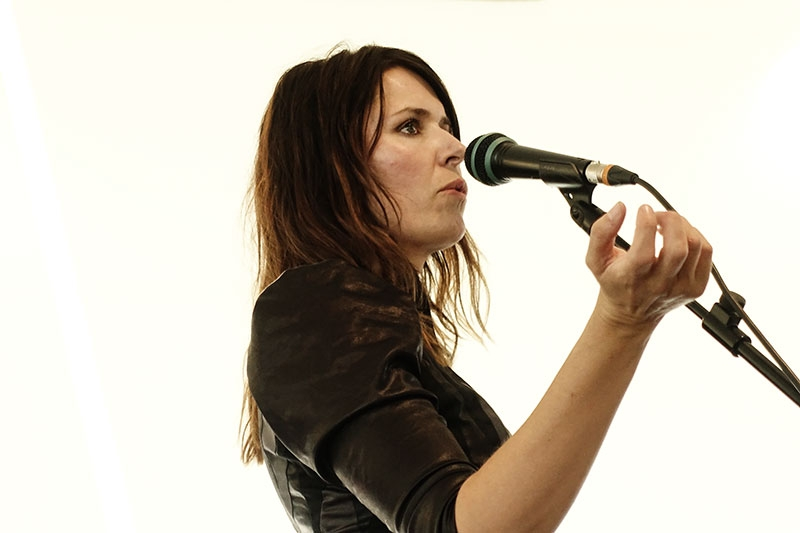
Kira Skov, Aarhus Jazz Festival 2016

Kira Skov (born 6 June 1976) is a Danish singer. She is best known for being the lead singer of rock band Kira & The Kindred Spirits.

== Early life ==
Kira was born in the town of Rødovre, and became interested in classical music through her aunt and uncle, both of whom are musicians.

When she was ten years old, her parents divorced, which was difficult for her. About that time she became interested in rock music, and so she tried to learn to play the guitar. This did not go well, however, as she did not have enough patience for it, and so she began singing instead.

== Career ==
=== Beginnings in Butterfly Species ===
In 1993 she went to London, where she met a guitarist called Eve, whom she followed to the United States. Together with Eve and—amongst others—Laust Sonne, she formed a band called Butterfly Species, which existed until 1999.

=== Kira & The Kindred Spirits ===
When Butterfly Species split, she left Eve and travelled back home to Denmark.

In 2001, she received a scholarship from Denmark's national arts foundation the Statens Kunstfond, which made it possible for her to concentrate on writing songs, and in 2002 she founded the band Kira & The Kindred Spirits. It was made up of:

- Kira Skov - vocals and guitar
- Rune Kjeldsen - guitar
- Orson Wajih and later replaced by *Nicolai Munch Hansen - bass
- Jesper Lind - drums
- Nicolaj Torp and later replaced by Jeppe Juul

Over the course of existence of the band from 2001 to 2007, the group became known as a good live band, with Kira as its dynamic powerhouse. They released three albums in the process. In October 2007 it was announced that Kira & The Kindred Spirits had split up and that Kira would pursue a solo career.

=== Solo ===
While in the band, Kira became well known for singing a duet with Lars H.U.G. at Rock 'N' Royal in 2004 just before the wedding between Crown Prince Frederik and Crown Princess Mary.

Kira Skov continued with a solo musical career in collaboration with Nicolai Munch Hansen from her former band. In 2014, she released a joint studio album with Marie Fisker entitled The Cabin Project.

== Discography ==
=== Kira & The Kindred Spirits ===
Album and details	Peak positions
Album and details	DEN
Happiness Saves Lives: Type: Studio album; Date released: 2002; Record label:	–
This Is Not an Exit: Type: Studio album; Date released: 2005; Record label: Copenhagen Re	7
Kira & The Kindred Spirits: Type: Studio album; Date released: 2006; Record label: Copenhagen Re	5

=== Solo as Kira Skov ===
Album and details	Peak positions
Album and details	DEN
Memories of Days Gone By: Type: Joint studio album; Date released: 2011; Record label: Sundance	–
When We Were Gentle: Type: Joint studio album; Date released: 2013; Record label: Stunt / Sundance	–
I nat blir vi gamle: Date released: 2019; Record label: Stunt / Sundance	33
Spirit Tree: Date released: 2021; Record label: Stunt	10

=== Kira Skov & Marie Fisker ===
Album and details	Peak positions
Album and details	DEN
The Cabin Project: Type: Joint studio album; Date released: 2014; Record label: Stunt Records	2
