= Secrets on Parade =

Studio album by Tim Christensen
- Released: 27 September 2000
- Recorded: December 1999 through March/April 2000; Puk Recording Studios (Gjerlev near Randers); Grapehouse studio (Copenhagen)
- Genre: Rock
- Length: 54:24
- Label: EMI
- Producer: Nick Foss; Tim Christensen

Tim Christensen chronology
Secrets on Parade (2000)	Honeyburst (2003)

Secrets on Parade is the debut solo album by Danish singer-songwriter Tim Christensen, released on 5 October 2000 on CD and vinyl. It is considered the transitional work between the music he made with Dizzy Mizz Lizzy and his solo music. Before its release, Christensen described the album as: "a rock album with material that is more timeless rather than time-typical [as was the case with Dizzy Mizz Lizzy] with room for solid rock, a glittery edge, and some ballads." The vinyl edition of the album was re-released through the record label Parlophone on April 19, 2014.

== Background ==
Christensen went through a difficult time in 1998–99, dealing with the break-ups with Dizzy Mizz Lizzy and with singer Pernille Rosendahl, with whom he had been in a relationship since 1995. He used songwriting as a form of therapy to overcome this, putting his feelings and thoughts to words as one normally would do in a diary, but instead of lying hidden in a drawer somewhere, his secrets are literally on display. Since his songwriting was derived from these personal experiences, the lyrics are rather direct. Christensen says, "I simply think it was written in a simple and straightforward way, almost bordering to banal."

The songs are rather ambiguous as to whether they refer to Dizzy Mizz Lizzy or Pernille Rosendahl. However, the song "King's Garden", after a literal translation of Kongens Have, is known to refer to both as coincidentally both break-ups happened there and he admits to avoid going near the place. "Secrets on Parade", "Prime Time" and "Caterpillar" had already been written for a third album by Dizzy Mizz Lizzy, and are not related to these troubles.

The album was "decidedly a solo record" but the process was also markedly different, explained by Christensen as follows: "This was the first time I was without sparring partners, and I would definitely have bounced some things off of them. At the same time, I went into the studio without completed arrangements, unlike with Dizzy Mizz Lizzy where everything was pre-arranged and there was simply not a single strophe that we did not know of how they should be played." This also meant more time was spent in the studio, in total nearly four months.

== Reception ==
The album was successful in Denmark, selling nearly 60,000 copies and securing a solo career for Christensen. Allegedly, Mary, Queen of Denmark is among the fans.

The singles "Get the Fuck Out of My Mind" and "Love Is a Matter of...." became hits. The latter would be covered by Will Young on for Friday's Child (2003) as "Love Is a Matter of Distance", and this version has appeared on several karaoke albums. The song "21st Century High" appeared on the soundtrack of the 2000 Danish movie Flickering Lights.

Aside from Christensen himself finding solace in his music, the album has had a profound effect on others dealing with grief as well. Christensen says, "There are really many who have responded to Secrets On Parade that it was almost therapeutic for them." He thinks this is because the lyrics cover the topics so explicitly: "When someone finds himself in a depressed state, I think that very direct words penetrate through much easier. One needs something that reaches out. It simply makes it easier to console oneself with."

== Track listing ==
All lyrics by Tim Christensen and Marcus Winther-John, except where noted.

All tracks are written by Tim Christensen.

Secrets on Parade
No.	Title	Length
1.	"Secrets on Parade"	4:40
2.	"Get the Fuck Out of My Mind"	4:24
3.	"Time Is the Space Between Us"	4:41
4.	"Love Is a Matter of..." (Lyrics: Christensen)	2:55
5.	"Watery Eyes" (Lyrics: Christensen)	3:08
6.	"Falling to Pieces" (Lyrics: Christensen / Jonathan Stibbard)	4:55
7.	"Let's Face It"	3:18
8.	"Prime Time" (Lyrics: Christensen)	4:20
9.	"Stranger" (Lyrics: Christensen / Stibbard)	4:31
10.	"21st Century High"	5:21
11.	"Caterpillar" (Lyrics: Christensen)	8:17
12.	"King's Garden"	4:00
Total length:		54:24

Japan bonus track
No.	Title	Length
13.	"Misty Mono" (Lyrics: Christensen)	4:24

== Personnel ==
- Tim Christensen – vocals, acoustic guitar, electric guitar, bass, Mellotron, producer
  Additional instruments: Wurlitzer electric piano, Moog synthesizer, talk box, guitar synthesizer, vocoder, glockenspiel, timpani, piano, baritone guitar, guitar zither, Spanish guitar
- Lars Skjærbæk - guitars (on track 3, 5, 7, 10), slide guitar (on track 12)
- Fredrik Damsgård - bass (on all tracks except 1, 2, 4, and 5)
- Laust Sonne - drums (on all tracks except 4)

Additional musicians

- Jonathan Stibbard - drums (on track 4), percussion (on track 4)
- Rune Olesen - percussion
- Henke Lindstrand - string arrangements, Wurlitzer piano (on track 12)

String section (on track 1, 9, 11)

- Tobias Durholm - violin
- Mikkel Futtrup - violin
- Sune Ranmo - viola
- Ingemar Brantelid - cello

Production

- Rune Nissen-Petersen – recording engineer, mixer (track 4)
- René Cambony - recording engineer
- Lars Overgaard - mixer
- Nick Foss – producer
- Nikolaj Vinten – mastering
- Jakob Tranberg (PowerPlant) – cover art
- Morten Larsen – photography
