= Mermaid Records =

Copenhagen, Denmark based record label

- Founded: 2005
- Founder: Mik Christensen; Nick Foss
- Distributor: The Orchard (company)
- Genre: Pop, rock
- Country of origin: Denmark
- Location: Copenhagen
- Official website: mermaidrecords.dk

Mermaid Records is a Copenhagen, Denmark based independent record label founded by Mik Christensen and Nick Foss in 2005. The label publishes distinguished Danish artists.

== History ==
In 2004, several key figures from EMI-Medley left the label and started Copenhagen Records to give artists more artistic freedom. Among them were Christensen and Foss, who started Mermaid Records in 2005, but remained with Copenhagen Records until 2008. Since 2008, the label is largely owned by Sony Music Entertainment Denmark to create more space for Danish music. The first album released after Sony became the main shareholder was Tim Christensen's third solo album, Superior.

Since 2016 the label have been independent once again

== Artists ==
- Aura Dione
- Big Fat Snake
- Bikstok Røgsystem
- Thomas Blachman
- Black City
- Martin Brygmann
- Tim Christensen
- D-A-D
- Niels Brinck
- Clemens
- Electric Lady Lab
- Go Go Berlin
- Julie
- Mekdes
- Østkyst Hustlers
- Rasmus Nøhr
- Sanne Salomonsen
- Hannah Schneider
- Sko/Torp
- Kira Skov
- Turboweekend
- Kasper Winding

== See also ==
- List of record labels
