= Nicolai Munch-Hansen =

Danish musician

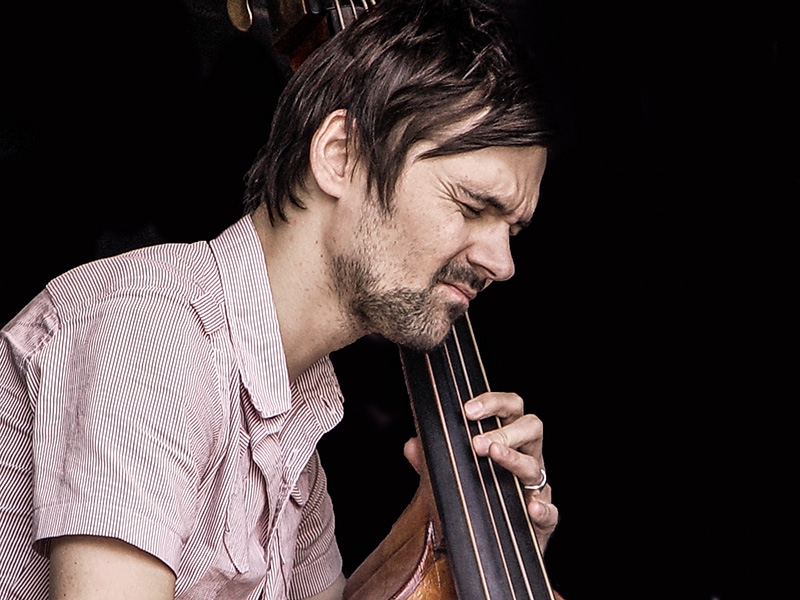
Nicolai Munch-Hansen

Nicolai Munch-Hansen (11 May 1977 – 20 February 2017) was a Danish jazz and rock musician (upright bass, bass guitar, composer).

== Biography ==
From the 1990s Much-Hansen played on the Danish rock and jazz scene among others with John Tchicai, Kresten Osgood, Nikolaj Nørlund, Tim Christensen, Jens Unmack, Caroline Henderson, Steffen Brandt, the Brande International Music Workshop Orchestra with Marilyn Mazur (A Story of Multiplicity, 1997), Rokia Traoré and with Hans Ulrik, in addition he played in the blues band of his wife Kira Skov. In 2010 he released his debut album Chronicles (Stunt Records), with Jakob Bro, Søren Kjærgaard, Ned Ferm and Mads Hyhne. Recently he released another album with the alternative rock singer Peter Laugesen. In the period between 1996 and 2012 he collaborated on eleven jazz recording sessions.

== Discography ==
- Hans Ulrik's Jazz & Mambo: Danish Standards (Stunt Records, 2003)
- John Tchicai / Jonas Müller / Nikolai Munch-Hansen / Kresten Osgood: Coltrane in Spring (ILK Music, 2008)
- Nicolai Munch-Hansen, Peter Laugesen: Det Flimrende Lys Over Brabrand Sø (Stunt, 2016)
