= Dizzy Mizz Lizzy =

Alternative rock band from Denmark

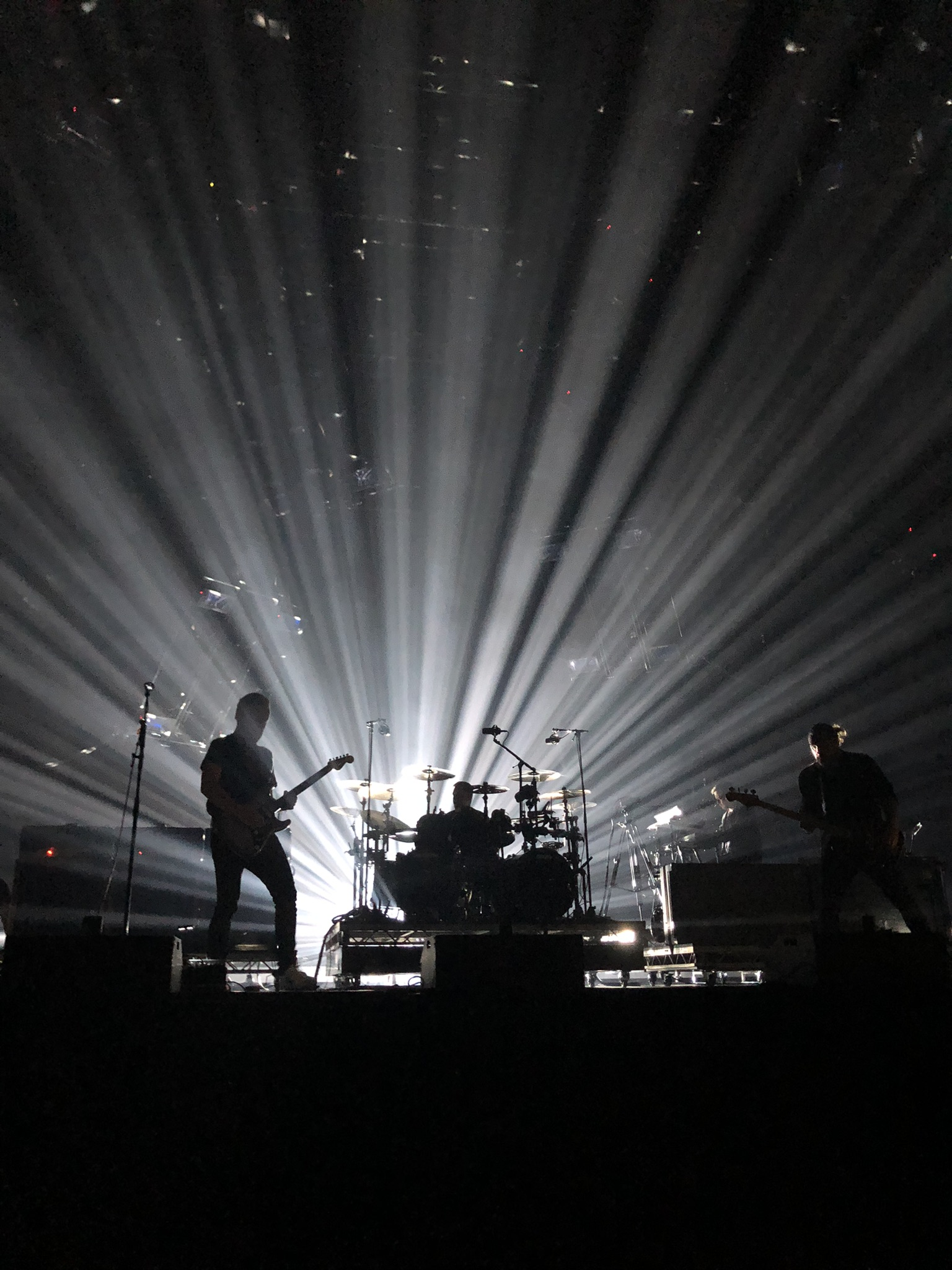
- Dizzy Mizz Lizzy performing in 2022

Background information
- Also known as: Dizzy (abbreviation); DML (abbreviation)
- Origin: Valby, Denmark
- Genres: Alternative rock, arena rock
- Years active: 1988–1998; 2009–2010; 2014–current
- Labels: EMI, ArtPeople, Columbia, Sony Music
- Members: Tim Christensen; Martin Nielsen; Søren Friis

Dizzy Mizz Lizzy is an alternative rock band from Copenhagen formed in October 1988 in Valby. The power trio consists of Tim Christensen (vocals, guitar, songwriter), Martin Nielsen (bass guitar) and Søren Friis (drums). Dizzy Mizz Lizzy have stated that they are influenced by The Beatles, Jimi Hendrix, Led Zeppelin and Nirvana, but are not very fond of the designation grunge, which Dizzy perceived as an overused buzzword in 1994. Between 1994 and 1997, they were highly successful in Denmark and Japan and are credited for heading the 1990s rock revival in Denmark with their studio albums Dizzy Mizz Lizzy (1994) and Rotator (1996). After the group disbanded in 1998, Christensen started a successful solo career.

In 2010, Dizzy Mizz Lizzy undertook a reunion tour in Denmark and Japan in their original line-up. The popularity of Live in Concert 2010, recorded during this reunion, caused the band to consider a more permanent comeback, which they announced in late 2014. Their third studio album Forward in Reverse (2016), and its successor Alter Echo (2020) were both released to critical acclaim and helped regain their position as Denmark's most popular rock band. To date, the band has released four studio albums and three live albums.

== History ==
=== Formation and early years (1988–1994) ===
When Tim Christensen's family moved from Espergærde to Valby, a district of Copenhagen, he started attending the Hanssted Skole, where he became friends with his classmate Martin Nielsen on the first day of school, They already cared more about music than about their school work, and decided to start a band. Nielsen picked up the bass because Christensen already played the guitar, and a friend recommended Søren Friis to them. Prior to choosing "Dizzy Mizz Lizzy", they also considered "Heaven", "King's Cross", "Battlefield", "After the Storm" and "Boyazont" as a band name.

The trio practiced instrumentally in the first year while looking for a fourth member who could sing and play guitar, because Christensen, the band's songwriter, was too shy to sing. This continued until they held an audition with Noller from Hvidovre, who sang so badly that they sent him home after a glass of cola. It was then that Friis and Nielsen convinced Christensen to do the vocals in the absence of a better singer, because they felt that every time he sang to demonstrate how he wanted the melody, it sounded exactly the way it should. Later attempts at expanding to a quartet with an extra guitarist failed, and critics would explain: "From the outset it was clear that Tim Christensen was the group's undisputed center, but the band benefited significantly from the collective dynamics."

Dizzy Mizz Lizzy's debut concert was in Valby on 8 December 1989 for about 75 people. In search of their own musical style, they used a cheap youth club in Hvidovre for a rehearsal room while playing "porn rock with nauseating choruses." Their inspiration came from poodle rock bands such as Europe, Bon Jovi and Def Leppard. They won the competition "Rock Træf" in 1990, using the 5,000 kr (about € 700, or US$ 800) in prize money to record a demo. The band subsequently entered Denmark's largest music championship DM i Rock in 1991 and came in fourth.

Inspired by Nirvana's 1991 album Nevermind and especially the breakthrough hit "Smells Like Teen Spirit", their style became more inspired by grunge. As the band would explain, "Suddenly there was something about playing rock music the old-fashioned way." They would throw themselves into "Hey Joe" by the Jimi Hendrix Experience, "Rock and Roll" by Led Zeppelin, and The Beatles' cover of the Larry Williams song "Dizzy, Miss Lizzy", from which they derived their band's name. They started writing potential song material and decided to dedicate themselves to a career in music.

Christensen received a Marshall 4x12 G1275 amplifier from his parents for his 18th birthday, which helped him write heavier music and would shortly thereafter result in the riff to the hit song "Waterline". Their style would frequently be compared to Led Zeppelin and Pearl Jam, even though critics admitted that "the trio wants—and inexplicably even manages—to create their own musical identity." This style would become known as power rock, which the band would later also use to describe their genre and which they were more comfortable with than the label "grunge", explaining: "We are not so wild about the descriptor grunge, as it has become a predicate for a variety of dimensions. We focus on the music, not the descriptions. What we play is genuine, vivid, and with the energy in high gear." As a reviewer would put it: "[It is] 'Grunge light' perhaps - but well-composed, well-acted, engaging and above all different and personal. Dizzy Mizz Lizzy had the pedal to the metal, and it did something." Christensen explains: "It's like The Police, who came out of the punk-wave without being punk, and still did well. It's the same with us. We came out of the grunge-wave, without being grunge."

Dizzy Mizz Lizzy's new-found sound took them to the DM i Rock semifinals in 1992, where they were beaten by Passion Orange. With Dizzy Mizz Lizzy's third attempt at DM i Rock in Jazzhus Montmartre on 30 April 1993, the trio won because of "their obvious talent and charisma." Part of the grand prize was a recording session for a 4-track demo at Sweet Silence Studios, which spawned the songs "Waterline" and "Silverflame" that became huge hits on DR P3 and DR P4. The grand prize also contained a spot in the travelling Rock Show '93 and performances at the L'Europe d'Art d'Art festival in Niort, France, the Nordic Rock '93 competition that they also won, and all the major Danish summer festivals. A reviewer from that time remarked, "They are not quite as extroverted as one might have expected, but in return they play much better than one might dare hope for. Dense and energetic, making one wonder why there are only three men on stage. One is tempted to look into the back room to see where the rest of the band is hiding." They would also entertain with ironic covers of among others "Stayin' Alive" by the Bee Gees.

Other contestants in the 1993 DM i Rock competition included Kashmir, who came in second, Inside the Whale, and Impotators. These bands have all had a significant place in the 1990s revival and the further development of rock in Denmark, but of which Dizzy Mizz Lizzy has been the most successful. Friendships have grown among this generation of musicians, which can among others be seen in Christensen's contributions to several Kashmir albums, his continued songwriting with Inside the Whale frontman Marcus Winther-John, and with Inside the Whale guitarist Lars Skjærbæk being the lead guitarist in Christensen's solo band since 2000.

=== Dizzy Mizz Lizzy (1994–1996) ===
The high expectations raised by the demo put enormous pressure on the band to deliver, especially because the demo was in limited circulation. The demand grew, but the band took their time to release their debut album. Dizzy Mizz Lizzy had declined various offers from foreign labels, waiting for a Danish label to come forward. They "quite literally felt on home soil" when they were contacted by Nick Foss, head of A&R at EMI-Medley, and known by the band as the producer of several albums by D-A-D and The Sandmen. He signed them to the label and went into the studio with them for three months.

At long last, the eponymous debut album Dizzy Mizz Lizzy was released on 4 March 1994 in Europe and 18 January 1995 in Japan. It was a huge success in Denmark, was on the local record chart for almost two years and sold 220,000 copies, which makes it the best selling debut rock album ever in Denmark. This record still stands, and has sold over 250,000 copies by 2011. One notable fan is King Frederik X, who is an outspoken lover of rock music, and who has attended many of their concerts. By accident, a copy of the CD fell into the hands of someone at EMI's Japanese division, who was excited about the album and had it released in Japan, where it sold about 100,000 copies. Five singles were released from the album and all got much radio play: "Silverflame", "Barbedwired Baby's Dream", "Love Is a Loser's Game", "Glory" and "Waterline". The band is recognized for heading the early 1990s rock revival in Denmark, which Christensen would later explain as follows: "The Dizzy records were a mild version of what took place in Seattle with a delay of two years, and therefore perfect for Denmark," referring to the grunge movement. However, they lacked an entrance to the UK and US like the modern Danish rock bands do.

Interviews paint a picture of rather well-behaved musicians; they kept living with their parents until their debut album and the ensuing tour had earned them enough money to each buy their own homes in Copenhagen. The closest they ever came to rock star misbehavior was a backstage food fight in Aalborg with Inside the Whale, and trashing a disappointing hotel room in Germany at a time they felt depressed and homesick. The band members rehearsed 3–4 times a week but also received choreography lessons since at that time they considered themselves "an incredibly boring band to watch" in terms of their performance.

They were the support act of the Spin Doctors on their October/November 1994 tour through Denmark, Sweden, Norway, Germany, the Netherlands, Belgium, Austria, and Switzerland. before they flew to Japan to play three sold-out shows in the cities Sapporo, Osaka and Tokyo. The performance in Osaka on 16 July 1995 was recorded and released as the Japan-only CD One Guitar, One Bass and a Drummer, That's Really All It Takes — Live in Japan, which was later included in the Dizzcography box set. Dizzy Mizz Lizzy performed for four consecutive years at the Roskilde Festival, from 1993 through to 1996. The 1994 performance was on frontman Christensen's 20th birthday, when sales of their debut album had just crossed the 50,000 mark. In 2003, Christensen considered that particular performance a special highlight in his career. Dizzy Mizz Lizzy won the 1995 Danish Grammys for "Danish group of the year", "Danish newcomer of the year", "Danish rock album of the year", and the "People's choice award" which included a fee of 25,000 kr (about € 3,350, or US$ 3,800) to help cover travel expenses. In the time leading up to the release of the band's sophomore album, it was speculated the band would be changing their name to "Dizzy". Although this abbreviation is in widespread colloquial use among both band members and fans, the band never considered using it as an official name.

=== Rotator (1996–1998) ===
Nick Foss had promised Christensen that if their debut album won gold (equal to 40,000 copies at that time), the next one would be recorded at the Abbey Road Studios in London, which would fulfill a boyhood dream of Christensen, who is a fan of The Beatles. With the album having sold over four times that amount by 1996, Foss kept his promise and saw to it that the follow-up album Rotator was recorded at the studio.

A crisis ensued when Christensen was going through a gamut of emotions while recording at the Abbey Road Studios. Christensen could not share these feelings with the other band members, as they neither shared Christensen's enthusiasm, nor could appreciate the unique symbolism of recording in these legendary studios as much as Christensen did. This caused Christensen to turn to his long-time girlfriend Pernille Rosendahl in and out of the studio, while growing increasingly estranged from the band. Nielsen and Friis even went so far as to call the couple as "John and Yoko", referring to the supposed detrimental influence of Yoko Ono on John Lennon, which is said to have contributed to the break-up of the Beatles. This period also showed the first signs of the band members heading in different musical directions, about which Christensen explained in 2000: "I needed change, while the others wanted to continue in the same style, and that was actually the most important reason we split up." This is especially evident from the final song on the album "Rise and Fall"; although songs were usually a collaborative effort by the band, Christensen requested Nielsen and Friis to allow him to be in full control over this song, and as a result it is distinctly different from all other songs on the album.

The record was less carefree than its predecessor, with a hint of bitterness especially in regard to the state of the music industry. The album reached gold status the very day it went on sale in Europe, 2 April 1996 and 24 May 1996 in Japan, and appeared to live up to the notorious expectations for a worthy sequel to their debut album. Reviews were generally positive and it sold 100,000 copies in Denmark, "which is exceptionally high for a guitar rock album in Denmark," though it fell significantly short of the sales figures for their debut. Another 100,000 copies were sold in Japan. The singles "11:07 PM" and "Rotator" became hits, the album won the 1997 Danish Grammy for "Rock Album of the Year," and Nick Foss received the prize for "Best Producer". They played at festivals in Denmark, Norway and Germany, and went to Japan in September 1996 for shows in Tokyo (2×), Sapporo, Osaka, Nagoya and Fukuoka. In Denmark, they played dozens of shows, which fatigued both the band and the fans, while the problems that arose during the recording of Rotator also pursued the band on tour.

=== Disbandment (1998–2009) ===
After five years of non stop recording and touring and having lost touch with reality, the band decided to take a sabbatical in 1997. They worked on some demos in January 1998, but did not find the band dynamics revitalized, and the trio decided to split up on 10 March 1998 when discussing the future of the band on a bench in the Rosenborg Castle Gardens. A press release was issued the same day that stated the band is dissolved, and has in total won 5 Danish Grammy Awards, as well as Tuborgs Grønne Pris. The split occurred amidst a wave of prominent Danish bands disbanding. Critics would later explain their decision as the band having the courage to stop in time despite enormous success, although it was largely due to fatigue that the trio could not bring themselves to continuing to play. Their tastes in music had become less compatible, with Christensen wanting a more vintage Beatles-like sound and Nielsen and Friis preferring to make heavy metal music.

Eighteen days after the breakup, the Japan-only release The Greatest was released. The song "Waterline" was included on the 1999 charity record Grænseløs Greatest in support of refugees of the Kosovo War. In 2000, the Danish dance-pop duo Infernal used samples of the 1994 song "Silverflame" for the song "Sunrise". It was released as the second single from their album Waiting for Daylight.

Following the breakup, Christensen became more introverted than usual, and his girlfriend could not handle him being in this crisis. He went through a difficult time of coping with both his breakup with the band and with Rosendahl, but he went on to find his musical style, which resulted in the release of his debut solo album Secrets on Parade in 2000, of which some songs were based on the Dizzy Mizz Lizzy demos from 1998. Several songs on the album were rather ambiguous as to whether they referred to Dizzy Mizz Lizzy or Rosendahl. The album was a success, and it allowed him to further pursue a career in music. Nielsen and Friis initially also intended to continue in music, but turned to a normal working-class life. To walk off the extra weight he had gained from being at home for a long time, Nielsen took a job as a postman, while Friis became a truck driver delivering gas containers. Despite their different paths, Christensen explained in a 2000 interview that the trio remained friends: "We meet occasionally and have great fun together. Of course we talk about the old days and amuse ourselves with it, because we experienced a lot of great things together and I simply can not remember anything bad from back then. (...) But we just developed ourselves in three different directions, and we kept growing further apart, so it was simply the time to stop."

On 29 April 2002, the band released a greatest hits collection named The Best of Dizzy Mizz Lizzy + Live in Aarhus '96, which includes a live performance recorded in Aarhus on 11 May 1996. The band's only performance during their 1998–2009 break was a charity concert called Brandalarm (Fire Alarm), held on 16 August 2006 in the Copenhagen venue Vega for musicians whose studio had burned to the ground. Here, they played 5 songs in about 20 minutes ("Thorn in my Pride", "When the River Runs Dry", "Waterline", "Silverflame", and "Glory"). Christensen commented in 2008 that this was a one-off event, but that the band would be open to do a reunion tour at some point in the future for nostalgia's sake, but without the aim to go back into the studio to record a new album. The band would later refer to the charity concert as the first germ towards a reunion.

=== First reunion (2009–2010) ===
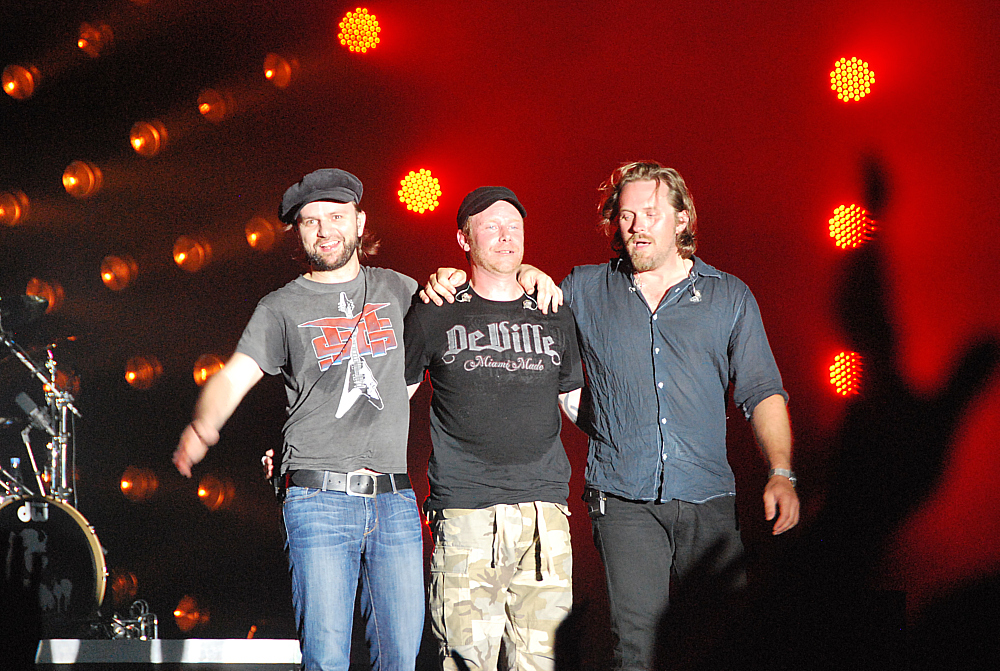
Dizzy Mizz Lizzy at Vig Festival in July 2010.

On 15 September 2009, the band announced they would hold a small reunion tour in Spring 2010, with concerts in Odense, Aarhus (2 shows), Aalborg, Esbjerg (2 shows) and Copenhagen (4 shows). The idea was spawned when Christensen, Nielsen and Friis were bowling, which they often did when meeting up. EMI suggested the reunion to be paired with the release of a box set containing their collected works. Although the band were sceptical about this at first, Dizzcography (a portmanteau of 'Dizzy' and 'discography') was released on 29 March 2010 as a 4-CD or 8-vinyl record box set, containing remasters of all previously released material (the band's two studio albums Dizzy Mizz Lizzy and Rotator and the live album Live in Aarhus '96), and the compilation album The Rest of Dizzy Mizz Lizzy which comprises the original 1993 demo, two B-sides and the tracks from the live album Live in Japan.

Dizzy Mizz Lizzy were overwhelmed when the tour's first show on 9 April at the K.B. Hallen had sold out in less than 15 seconds on 20 September 2009, and the other shows sold out in less than 45 seconds, showing that the demand for their shows was far greater than they expected. The band subsequently expanded the tour that would eventually total 52 dates, including festival headlines and Japanese legs to the tour in May and September, making this one of the most successful comebacks in the history of Danish music. Their performance at the Roskilde Festival coincided with Christensen's 36th birthday. The renewed interest for Dizzy Mizz Lizzy inspired the Danish producer and DJ Morten Breum to release a remix of "Waterline" on 5 April 2010.

After the tour's final show in Tokyo on 29 September 2010, the band returned to hibernation. The documentary Lost Inside a Dream: The Story of Dizzy Mizz Lizzy by the Danish film maker Theis Molin exploring the band's rise, break-up and reunion premiered at the Copenhagen International Documentary Festival on 4 November 2010. The band attended the film's second screening on 8 November 2010, where they answered questions from the audience. On the same day, the 2CD/DVD and 2CD/Blu-ray set Live in Concert 2010 was released, which includes the documentary and features a live recording of two concerts in the K.B. Hallen on 16–17 April 2010, making it the first Danish performance to be released in Full HD. The moment where Dizzy Mizz Lizzy were awarded a platinum record for this live recording would later be considered the turning point towards the band considering a more permanent comeback. Molin received the Politiken Publikumspris (People's choice award) for his documentary. A few days later, on 12 November 2010, EMI released the compilation album Big-5: Dizzy Mizz Lizzy as part of their Big-5 series, containing their artists' five best tracks. In the case of Dizzy Mizz Lizzy, these were all taken from their eponymous debut album.

For the reunion tour, Christensen and Rasmus Meyer of Danish guitar pedal manufacturer Carl Martin designed a signature Dizzy Drive with knobs for level, tone, drive and edge. Its production was limited to 250 pedals, and went on sale on 16 May 2010.

=== Second hiatus (2010–2014) ===
After the reunion, Nielsen and Friis returned to anonymity and resumed their respective jobs as postman and truck driver. while Christensen continued his solo career, with his fourth solo album, Tim Christensen and The Damn Crystals getting released on 25 November 2011. In interviews, he was often asked questions about Dizzy Mizz Lizzy, to which Christensen explained that already a week after the last show, Dizzy Mizz Lizzy was out of his system again. Prior to the reunion, Christensen was often being asked about a Dizzy-reunion. On the question whether people have stopped asking about this now, Christensen answered: "No, they haven't. Except that now, it's no longer: 'Will Dizzy ever reunite?' but instead: 'Will you do it again?' And I won't exclude the possibility, but it won't be any time soon. But I have stopped asking that question to myself." Christensen went on to release The EP Series, Volume 1: Acoustic Covers in 2012, and he performed a Paul McCartney tribute with Mike Viola, Tracy Bonham and his solo band The Damn Crystals in 2012, which was released as the live album Pure McCartney in 2013. Together with Mads Langer, he recorded the EP Side Effects in 2014, of which "Bringing Back Tomorrow" became a hit. He was expected to also be working on his fifth solo album or a second volume of The EP Series, which Christensen still plans in addition to the Dizzy Mizz Lizzy reunion.

=== Second reunion and Forward in Reverse (2014–2017) ===
On 20 October 2014, Christensen wrote the abbreviation "DML2015" on his Facebook wall, indicating a second reunion of his former band Dizzy Mizz Lizzy. Two days later, they revealed that they had written new songs and that six shows in Denmark were booked for April–May 2015, though at that time they indicated it was not yet known if the band would release an LP, an EP, or just one or two singles, as that would depend on the mood and creativity. However, they later revealed that they had worked on the album for several years in secret.

The band explained during a concert on 5 June 2015 that they do not consider themselves a reunited band, but a re-activated band. The band's first new single in 19 years, "I Would If I Could but I Can't", was aired on the Danish radio station DR P3 on 5 January 2015. Their first performance of their second reunion was during "Sport 2014", a Danish sports ceremony, where they also played their single. The second single, "Made to Believe", was released on 10 April 2015 in honor of their tour start. The band among others toured through Denmark, played at Bospop in the Netherlands, and held several concerts in Japan. Before the tour, a secret rehearsal concert was performed in the same small club in Valby where they held their first larger performance in 1989, to which they invited former classmates of the band members.

On 6 November 2015, a biography of the band was released entitled Dizzy Mizz Lizzy: En drengedrøm (which means Dizzy Mizz Lizzy: A Boy's Dream), written by Jan Poulsen. On 7 November 2015, they performed at the Danish Grammy ceremony, where Christensen won the IFPI's Ærespris (Honorary Award), which is considered the most prestigious prize a Danish musician can be awarded. On 12 March 2016, they performed a show for Rockpalast.

The band's third studio album, Forward in Reverse was released on 20 April 2016, which was their first collection of new material in 20 years, after Rotator from 24 May 1996. In anticipation of the album, "Brainless" was released as the third single on 1 April 2016. It received the GAFFA Award for Danish album of the year and Danish rock album of the year for 2016. The album's release was followed by an extensive tour of festivals and clubs in Denmark, and concerts in Japan, the Netherlands and Germany, playing their last show in support of the album on 10 June 2017 in Berlin.

=== Livegasm! and Alter Echo (2017–current) ===
In the second half of 2017, the band started to work on new material in the studio. During this time, the band released the live double-LP Livegasm! on 29 November (Japan) and 8 December 2017 (Denmark). It instantly became the best sold vinyl record in Denmark of 2017. The band occasionally played shows, also trying out new songs such as "In the Blood" and "California Rain". On 25 May 2019, they performed a double headline concert with Lenny Kravitz at Horsens Statsfængsel (Horsens State Prison).

On 20 March 2020, Dizzy Mizz Lizzy released their fourth studio album Alter Echo, which had initially been announced for 2018. The album was lauded with the GAFFA Award for Danish rock album of the year, while Christensen received the award for songwriter of the year for the first time in his career. An instrumental version of the album, Alter Echo Instrumental, was exclusively released on vinyl on 12 February 2021, initially to a limited run of 600 copies, but later receiving a second pressing due to high demand. For this album, the songs were remixed and newly mastered.

Because of the greater infusion of ambient and orchestral elements in the band's newer material, Dizzy Mizz Lizzy asked Anders Stig Møller of Turboweekend to join them on keyboards on tour. With the album's release coinciding with the outbreak of the COVID-19 pandemic, the band was initially able to play only a few smaller shows when restrictions were partially lifted, ultimately performing their widely praised "Arena Tour" at five large arenas across Denmark in April 2022, closing at the Royal Arena.

On 1 September 2021, the music video for the five-piece suite "Amelia", totaling 23 minutes, premiered at the Odense International Film Festival, directed by Marc Louis Sutton and starring Angela Bundalovic. At the same time, the band released "Amelia" as a single in Denmark. As short film, the video among other things won Best rock music video at the Euro Music Video Song Awards (February 2022) and Best music video at the 2022 San Francisco Indie Short Festival.

On 12 March 2022, Dizzy Mizz Lizzy played the song "In the Blood" during the Sammen for Ukraine (Together for Ukraine) charity concert at Copenhagen's City Hall Square to aid victims of the Russo-Ukrainian War, which was streamed live on Danish TV and radio.

== Mascot ==
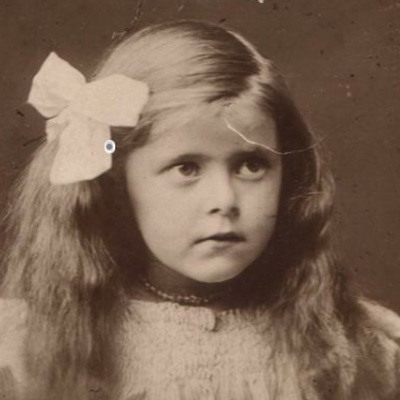
Dizzy Mizz Lizzy's mascot as sepia photograph

Since the band's early days, Dizzy Mizz Lizzy have been using the photo of a young "dizzy" girl as mascot, which has been used in varying ways. Christensen explains: "The photo is from around 1920. It depicts the older sister of my grandmother on mother's side. She died around the age of 12–14 of tuberculosis. Her real name is Vera. There are two or three copies of the photo in my family. I have one hanging in my apartment. The same photo hung in my home, and when we were searching for a cover for our first release (the 1993 promo), we felt it was a great idea to use the picture of her as a sort of mascot or logo." On their demo's cover, the photograph was colored with fluorescent colors. Danish designer MandOverBord subsequently used the picture for the band's eponymous debut album and singles, coloring the girl with more natural colors but also adding red laser beams coming from her eyes. The 2002 compilation album The Best of Dizzy Mizz Lizzy + Live in Aarhus '96 superimposed the mascot over the cover art from the band's second album, Rotator. During the band's 2009 reunion, the mascot was used in promotional material and on stage, and appeared in a duotone black and white portrayal on the front of the 2010 Dizzcography box set. This set included all previous albums, of which the artwork (including the mascot) were completely redrawn because the original designs had not been saved. The live DVD Live in Concert 2010 features a black and white rendering of the original photo amidst text in a theater poster design. After the band reunited in 2014, the mascot was again used, this time in the form of an anaglyph 3D rendering for promotional material, on stage, and the cover art of the 2016 studio album Forward in Reverse and its singles.

== Awards ==
- 1993 Danish rock championship
- 1994 Danish group of the year (GAFFA Award)
- 1995 Danish group of the year (Danish Grammy)
- 1995 Danish newcomer of the year (Danish Grammy)
- 1995 Danish rock album of the year (Danish Grammy for Dizzy Mizz Lizzy)
- 1995 People's choice award / "Green prize" (Danish Grammy)
- 1996 Danish live group of the year (GAFFA Award)
- 1997 Danish live group of the year (GAFFA Award)
- 1997 Danish rock album of the year (Danish Grammy for Rotator)
- 1997 Danish producer of the year (Danish Grammy for Nick Foss for Rotator)
- 2016 Danish album of the year (GAFFA Award for Forward In Reverse)
- 2016 Danish rock album of the year (GAFFA Award for Forward In Reverse)
- 2021 Danish rock album of the year (GAFFA Award for Alter Echo)
- 2021 Songwriter of the year (GAFFA Award)

== Discography ==
=== Studio albums ===
| Year | Album details | Peak chart positions | | Sales | Certifications |
| Year | Album details | DK | JP | Sales | Certifications |
|---|---|---|---|---|---|
| 1994 | Dizzy Mizz Lizzy: Released: 4 March 1994 (Europe), 18 January 1995 (Japan); Label: EMI-Medley; Producer: Nick Foss, Dizzy Mizz Lizzy | 1 | 8 | DK: 250,000; JP: 100,000 | DK: 4 Danish Grammys; DK: 13× Platinum |
| 1996 | Rotator: Released: 2 April 1996 (Europe), 24 May 1996 (Japan); Label: EMI-Casadida; Producer: Nick Foss, Dizzy Mizz Lizzy | 2 | — | DK: 120,000; JP: 100,000 | DK: 2 Danish Grammys; DK: 2× Platinum |
| 2016 | Forward in Reverse: Released: 29 April 2016; Label: Sony Music; Producer: Dizzy Mizz Lizzy | 1 | 16 | | |
| 2020 | Alter Echo: Released: 20 March 2020; Label: Sony Music; Producer: Dizzy Mizz Lizzy | 2 | 35 | JP: 2,001 | |

=== Live albums ===
| Year | Album details | Peak chart positions | |
| Year | Album details | DK | JP |
|---|---|---|---|
| 1995 | One Guitar, One Bass and a Drummer, That's Really All It Takes — Live in Japan: Released: 13 December 1995; Label: EMI; Japan-only | — | — |
| 2010 | Live in Concert 2010: Released: 8 November 2010 (Europe), 27 April 2011 (Japan); Label: EMI; Producer: Theis Molin | 4 | 147 |
| 2017 | Livegasm!: Released: 8 December 2017; Label: Columbia | 4 | — |

=== Compilation albums ===
| Year | Album details | Peak chart positions |
| Year | Album details | DK |
|---|---|---|
| 1998 | The Greatest: Released: 28 March 1998; Label: EMI; Japan-only | — |
| 2002 | The Best of Dizzy Mizz Lizzy + Live in Aarhus '96: Released: 29 April 2002; Label: EMI-Casadida; Producer: Nick Foss, Lars Overgaard | 4 |
| 2010 | Dizzcography: Released: 29 March 2010; Label: EMI; Producer: Dizzy Mizz Lizzy, Nick Foss, Flemming Hansson | 6 |
| 2010 | Big-5: Dizzy Mizz Lizzy: Released: 21 November 2010; Label: EMI | — |

=== Singles ===
| Year | Title | Peak chart positions | Album |
| Year | Title | DK | Album |
|---|---|---|---|
| 1994 | "Waterline" | 24^{[A]} | Dizzy Mizz Lizzy |
| 1994 | "Barbedwired Baby's Dream" | — | Dizzy Mizz Lizzy |
| 1994 | "Love Is a Loser's Game" | 13^{[B]} | Dizzy Mizz Lizzy |
| 1995 | "Silverflame" | 89 | Dizzy Mizz Lizzy |
| 1995 | "Glory" | — | Dizzy Mizz Lizzy |
| 1996 | "Rotator" | — | Rotator |
| 1996 | "Find My Way" (Japanese promo) | — | Rotator |
| 1996 | "11:07 PM" | — | Rotator |
| 1996 | "When the River Runs Dry" | — | Rotator |
| 2015 | "I Would If I Could But I Can't" | 44 | Forward in Reverse |
| 2015 | "Made to Believe" | 6 | Forward in Reverse |
| 2015 | "Brainless" | 20 | Forward in Reverse |

- A. The chart position is a re-entry on April 16. 2010 with the release of the "Morten Breum Remix" of "Waterline".
- B. "Love Is a Loser's Game" charted at number 13 on the Danish Single Chart in week 35, 1994. This might not be its peak position.
