= Livegasm! =

Live album by Dizzy Mizz Lizzy
- Released: November 29, 2017 (Japan); December 8, 2017 (Denmark)
- Recorded: 2016
- Venue: Roskilde Festival, Denmark, July 2, 2016; Tinderbox, Denmark, June 24, 2016; Målrock, Norway, August 11, 2016
- Genre: Grunge, alternative rock
- Length: 78 min
- Label: Columbia / Sony Music

Dizzy Mizz Lizzy chronology
Forward in Reverse (2016)	Livegasm! (2017)	Alter Echo (2020)

Livegasm! is the third live album by the Danish power rock band Dizzy Mizz Lizzy, released on 29 November 2017 in Japan, and on 8 December 2017 in Denmark on double vinyl and as digital album on Columbia Records. It instantly became the best sold vinyl record in Denmark in 2017.

The songs are a compilation of recordings from three festival shows by the band in the summer of 2016, with the tracks predominantly originating from their show at the Roskilde Festival in Roskilde (Denmark). Additional tracks were recorded at Tinderbox in Odense, Denmark and Målrock in Årdal Municipality, Norway. It includes songs that have not been recorded live before.

The album title is derived from the song Mindgasm on the band's 2016 album Forward in Reverse.

== Track listing ==
All tracks written by Tim Christensen and arranged by Dizzy Mizz Lizzy.

Record one

Side one
No.	Title	Original album	Length
1.	"Forward in Reverse"	Forward in Reverse	5:24
2.	"Terrified in Paradise"	Forward in Reverse	3:53
3.	"Brainless"	Forward in Reverse	4:35
4.	"Barbedwired Baby's Dream"	Dizzy Mizz Lizzy	4:55

Side two
No.	Title	Original album	Length
5.	"Glory"	Dizzy Mizz Lizzy	6:19
6.	"Love is a Loser's Game"	Dizzy Mizz Lizzy	4:31
7.	"Love at Second Sight"	Forward in Reverse	4:20
8.	"Made to Believe"	Forward in Reverse	4:45

Record two

Side three
No.	Title	Original album	Length
9.	"Rotator"	Rotator	3:19
10.	"67 Seas in Your Eyes"	Dizzy Mizz Lizzy	8:49
11.	"Say It to Me Anyway"	Forward in Reverse	7:20

Side four
No.	Title	Original album	Length
12.	"Waterline"	Dizzy Mizz Lizzy	5:01
13.	"Mindgasm"	Forward in Reverse	4:00
14.	"Silverflame"	Dizzy Mizz Lizzy	5:24
15.	"I Would If I Could But I Can't"	Forward in Reverse	5:24

== Critical reception ==
Professional ratings
Review scores
Source	Rating
Ekstra Bladet	4/6 stars
GAFFA	4/6 stars

Thomas Treo of Ekstra Bladet says that "the rock band's newfound format is firmly cemented with the concert recording Livegasm!", which "appears to sounds almost unreal" and on which the new songs impress the most.

Jan Opstrup Poulsen of Danish music magazine GAFFA calls Livegasm! "an excellent documentation of a band that has regained energy and can also play on new strings", on which "it is a bit unexpected that the new songs are the strongest", but "that the audience's singing along and cheering is fully mixed into the soundtrack [which] somewhat ruins the pleasure".

== Personnel ==
Dizzy Mizz Lizzy

- Tim Christensen – guitar, vocals, songwriting
- Martin Nielsen – bass
- Søren Friis – drums

Post-production

- Rune Nissen-Petersen – editor (at SortHus Recording Facility, Copenhagen, Denmark)
- Tomas Johansson – mastering (at The Panic Room, Skövde, Sweden)
- Jacob Hansen – mixing (at Hansen Studios, Ribe, Denmark)

Live crew

- Paul Hammann – FOH engineer
- Daniel Devantier – monitor engineer, recording engineer
- Kasper Lange – lighting design
- Robert Roos – production management
- Arild Nordgaard – guitar technician
- Vagn Olsen – technician
- Mif Damgaard – tour manager, production management

Additional crew

- Vibeke Nørskov (Nutwood Nest) – cover art designer
- Michael Boe Laigard – photography
- Henrik Seifert – booking, management

== Charts ==
Chart (2017)	Peak position
Danish Albums (Hitlisten)	4
