= The Best of Dizzy Mizz Lizzy + Live in Aarhus '96 =

Greatest hits album by Dizzy Mizz Lizzy
- Released: 29 April 2002
- Genre: Grunge; Alternative rock
- Length: 1:59:12
- Language: English
- Label: EMI-Casadida
- Producer: Nick Foss, Lars Overgaard

Dizzy Mizz Lizzy chronology
Rotator (1996)	The Best of Dizzy Mizz Lizzy + Live in Aarhus '96 (2002)	Dizzcography (2010)

Additional discs
- Disc Two: Live in Aarhus '96

The Best of Dizzy Mizz Lizzy + Live in Aarhus '96 is a greatest hits album released by the Danish rock band Dizzy Mizz Lizzy in 2002. The first disc contains tracks from the band's two studio albums Dizzy Mizz Lizzy and Rotator, the second disc holds a live registration of a concert held in Aarhus on 11 May 1996. After its release, it immediately reached gold status.

== Track listing ==
All tracks are written by Tim Christensen, except where noted

Disc One
No.	Title	Length
1.	"Waterline"	4:33
2.	"Rotator"	3:11
3.	"Love Is a Loser's Game"	3:49
4.	"Barbedwired Baby's Dream"	3:09
5.	"Run" (lyrics: Tim Christensen / Nic Wastell)	4:04
6.	"Silverflame"	5:14
7.	"Glory"	3:49
8.	"Thorn In My Pride" (written by: Christensen / Martin Nielsen)	3:06
9.	"11:07 PM" (lyrics: Christensen / Wastell)	4:11
10.	"67 Seas In Your Eyes"	4:40
11.	"Love Me a Little" (lyrics: Christensen / Thomas Rockwell)	4:02
12.	"When the River Runs Dry"	3:52
13.	"Rise and Fall" (lyrics: Christensen / Wastell)	3:19
Total length:		50:59

Disc Two: Live In Aarhus '96
No.	Title	Length
1.	"Thorn In My Pride" (written by: Christensen / Nielsen)	3:29
2.	"Rotator"	3:56
3.	"Barbedwired Baby's Dream"	4:35
4.	"Run" (lyrics: Christensen / Wastell)	4:27
5.	"When the River Runs Dry"	4:05
6.	"11:07 PM" (lyrics: Christensen / Wastell)	4:54
7.	"Glory"	4:39
8.	"Find My Way" (lyrics: Christensen / Wastell)	4:42
9.	"Medley: For God's Sake / Mother Nature's Recipe / 67 Seas In Your Eyes"	14:42
10.	"Waterline"	5:17
11.	"Alexander Salamander"	1:32
12.	"Silverflame"	5:27
13.	"Two of You" (lyrics: Christensen / Wastell)	6:28
Total length:		1:08:13

== Personnel ==
Dizzy Mizz Lizzy

- Tim Christensen – guitar, vocals, songwriter, co-producer, cover art
- Martin Nielsen – bass
- Søren Friis – drums

Production

- Dizzy Mizz Lizzy – arranger, compiler
- Nick Foss – producer
- Lars Overgaard – co-producer, mixer (disc 2)
- Rune Nissen-Petersen – engineer (disc 2)
- Nikolaj Vinten – mastering
- Peter Brander – recorded by (disc 2)
- Dan Christensen – cover art
- Martin Dam Kristensen – photography (disc 2)
