= Remixed Affairs =

Remix album by Infernal
- Released: 1998
- Genre: House; Dance
- Length: 66:19
- Label: FLEX Records

Infernal chronology
Infernal Affairs (1998)	Remixed Affairs (1998)	Waiting for Daylight (2000)

Remixed Affairs is the second album and first remix album by the Danish dance/house act Infernal, released in 1998 in Denmark. It contains two complete new tracks aside from six remixes, two live tracks and a megamix.

== Track listing ==
1. "Destruction" (Vocal Version) – 3:30
2. "Du Gamle Måne" – 3:42
3. "Groove Child" – 9:22
4. "Voodoo Cowboy" (Infernal's Radio Club Mix) – 3:45
5. "Sorti De L'enfer" (Harmonika Radio Mix) – 3:49
6. "Your Crown" (Pasta People's Whirl It Up Mix) – 8:37
7. "Highland Fling" (DJ Rainbow Mix) – 7:17
8. "Voodoo Cowboy" (Aliens Ate My C-C-Countryclub Mix) – 6:44
9. "Disk Jockey Polka" (Live) – 6:17
10. "Kalinka" (Live) – 8:15
11. "Re-Tape's Infernal Megamiz (Sorti De L'enferm Voodoo Cowboy, Kalinka, Your Crown)" – 5:06
