= Alter Echo (album) =

Studio album by Dizzy Mizz Lizzy
- Released: 20 March 2020
- Recorded: August 2019 – January 2020
- Studio: The Color Mill Studio (Copenhagen, Denmark)
- Genre: Alternative rock progressive rock
- Length: 46:16
- Label: Sony Music
- Producer: Tim Christensen

Dizzy Mizz Lizzy chronology
Livegasm! (2017)	Alter Echo (2020)

Singles from Alter Echo
- 1. "California Rain" Released: 7 November 2019; 2. "In the Blood" Released: 20 February 2020; 3. "The Middle" Released: 18 September 2020; 4. "Amelia" Released: 27 August 2021

Alter Echo is the fourth studio album by the Danish rock band Dizzy Mizz Lizzy. It was released on 20 March 2020 by Sony Music.

== Background ==
Following the band's 2014 reunion, their third studio album Forward in Reverse in 2016 marked their first original material released in nearly 20 years. The shift from the band's more grunge-oriented music from the 1990s towards hard rock was well-received by both critics and fans, and helped Dizzy Mizz Lizzy regain their position as Denmark's most popular rock band.

After touring Forward in Reverse, the band started to work on new material in the studio in the second half of 2017, and expected to release an album in 2018. However, the band decided to take extra time out to meet their high production quality standard. In 2018 and 2019, they continued to occasionally play shows, also trying out new songs they were working on, such as "In the Blood" and "California Rain". Album recording began in August 2019 at the privately owned Color Mill Studio. It marks the first album entirely self-produced by Tim Christensen.

== Release and reception ==
Professional ratings
Review scores
Source	Rating
Gaffa	5/6 stars
Jyllands-Posten	5/6 stars

Alter Echo was ultimately released on 20 March 2020 to favorable reviews. The album was lauded with the GAFFA Award for "Danish rock album of the year", while it garnered Christensen his first award for "Songwriter of the year". The album's name was inspired by TC Electronic's Alter Ego echo pedal, the meaning of which refers to an altered or alternative sound, particularly marking the band's transition in sound.

Because the album hit the market in the early days of the COVID-19 pandemic, the band had to postpone their "Arena Tour" several times, playing only several smaller shows in between. The tour ultimately commenced April 2022, with the shows being widely praised.

== Musical style ==
Stylistically, Alter Echo continues in a similar heavier vein as Forward in Reverse, with GAFFA describing the songs as "their slowest, longest and also heaviest to date", due to their metal and progressive influences. At the same time, in addition to the instruments of the power trio, orchestral and ambient arrangements play an increasingly dominant role.

== Track listing ==
All lyrics are written by Tim Christensen and Marcus Winther-John; all music is composed by Tim Christensen.

Side one
No.	Title	Length
1.	"The Ricochet"	2:42
2.	"In the Blood"	5:44
3.	"Boy Doom"	5:38
4.	"The Middle"	5:38
5.	"California Rain"	3:46
Total length:		23:18

Side two
No.	Title	Length
1.	"Amelia Part 1: Nothing They Do They Do for You"	4:11
2.	"Amelia Part 2: The Path of Least Existence"	5:06
3.	"Amelia Part 3: Lights Out"	4:07
4.	"Amelia Part 4: All Saints Are Sinners"	4:31
5.	"Amelia Part 5: Alter Echo"	4:47
Total length:		22:42

Japan CD bonus track
No.	Title	Length
15.	"Madness"	3:52

An instrumental version of the album, Alter Echo Instrumental, with remixed and newly mastered instrumentals of all tracks, was exclusively released on vinyl on 12 February 2021, initially to a limited run of 600 copies, but later receiving a second pressing due to high demand. The cover art is a near-inverted version of the album's visuals.

== Singles and music videos ==
- "California Rain"
- "In the Blood"
- "The Middle"
- "Amelia"

"California Rain" and "In the Blood" were released as singles prior to the album's release. The song "The Middle" was released on 18 September 2020 as a single, including music video. By public demand, the five-piece suite "Amelia", totaling 23 minutes, was released as a single on 27 August 2021. The music video premiered on 1 September 2021 at the Odense International Film Festival. It was made as a short film to visually tell the conceptual story told in "Amelia", about a young woman seeking help from the wrong people to get her back on track in life, resulting in a slow descent into a fanatic cult. It was directed by Marc Louis Sutton and starring Angela Bundalovic. It among other things won "Best rock music video" at the Euro Music Video Song Awards (February 2022) and "Best music video" at the 2022 San Francisco Indie Short Festival.

== Personnel ==
Dizzy Mizz Lizzy

- Tim Christensen – guitars, vocals, songwriter, producer, keyboards
- Martin Nielsen – bass
- Søren Friis – drums

Additional musicians

- Rune Olesen – additional percussion

Production

- Rune Nissen-Petersen – recording engineer
- Jacob Hansen – mix engineer (at Hansen Studio, Ribe, Denmark)
- Svante Forsbäck – mastering (at Chartmakers Audio Mastering, Helsinki)
- Paul Wilson – cover art, art director
- Jannick Boerlum – photography

== Charts ==
Chart performance for Alter Echo
Chart (2020)	Peak position
Danish Albums (Hitlisten)	2
Japanese Albums (Oricon)	35
