= Dizzcography =

Box set by Dizzy Mizz Lizzy
- Released: 29 March 2010
- Genre: Grunge; Alternative rock
- Length: 3:52:36
- Language: English
- Label: EMI
- Producer: Dizzy Mizz Lizzy; Malene Garp (production); Nick Foss; Flemming Hansson; Tim Christensen (executive producer & co-producer); Lars Overgaard (co-producer)

Dizzy Mizz Lizzy chronology
The Best of Dizzy Mizz Lizzy (2002)	Dizzcography (2010)	Live in Concert 2010 (2010)

Dizzcography is a box set released in 2010, containing all previously released material by the Danish rock band Dizzy Mizz Lizzy. The name is a portmanteau of "Dizzy" and "discography". The CD version is collected in a black printed cardboard box as four Digipak CDs and a 40-page booklet. The box set was also released in a limited press on 8 double-sided vinyl records, which was a major driver of creating this box set because the albums had not been released on vinyl previously. The box set contains four albums:

- Dizzy Mizz Lizzy (1994), digitally remastered. The cover art was completely redrawn because the original designs had not been saved.
- Rotator (1996), digitally remastered and also with redrawn cover art.
- Live in Aarhus '96, a live album which was released earlier as disc two of The Best of Dizzy Mizz Lizzy.
- The Rest of Dizzy Mizz Lizzy, a compilation album of songs from various releases:
  - Track 1–4: The band's 1993 demo. Recording a demo was part of the grand prize for winning the 1993 DM i Rock contest. Produced, recorded and mixed by Flemming Hansson and Dizzy Mizz Lizzy at Sweet Silence Studios, Copenhagen in June 1993.
  - Track 5–6: Two B-side tracks. "Hurry Hurry" was recorded during the sessions for Dizzy Mizz Lizzy. It appeared as a bonus track on the Japanese release, and as B-side on the "Love is a Loser's Game" single. "Pain Before My Eyes" was previously released as a bonus track on the Japanese edition of Rotator.
  - Track 7–13: The band's first live album One guitar, one bass and a drummer, that's really all it takes - Live in Japan, recorded on 16 July 1995 in Osaka, which was only released on CD in Japan.

Live in Concert 2010 was released several months after Dizzcography and was not included in the box set.

== Track listing ==
All tracks are written by Tim Christensen, except where noted

Disc One: Dizzy Mizz Lizzy
No.	Title	Length
1.	"Waterline"	4:33
2.	"Barbedwired Baby's Dream"	3:09
3.	"Love Is a Loser's Game"	3:48
4.	"Glory"	3:48
5.	"67 Seas In Your Eyes"	4:40
6.	"Silverflame"	5:12
7.	"Love Me a Little" (lyrics: Tim Christensen, Thomas Rockwell)	4:02
8.	"Mother Nature's Recipe"	3:08
9.	"...And So Did I"	4:42
10.	"Wishing Well"	3:36
11.	"Hidden War" (lyrics: Christensen, Rockwell)	4:47
12.	"For God's Sake"	3:57
13.	"Too Close to Stab" (lyrics: Christensen, Rockwell)	5:10
Total length:		54:27

Disc Two: Rotator
No.	Title	Length
1.	"Thorn In My Pride" (written by: Tim Christensen, Martin Nielsen)	3:07
2.	"Run" (lyrics: Christensen, Nic Wastell)	4:06
3.	"Rotator"	3:31
4.	"11:07 PM" (lyrics: Christensen, Wastell)	4:10
5.	"Back-Bone-Beat" (lyrics: Christensen, Wastell, music: Christensen, Nielsen)	4:39
6.	"When the River Runs Dry"	3:52
7.	"Break"	4:05
8.	"I Like Surprises" (lyrics: Christensen, Wastell)	3:14
9.	"Riff Sang"	3:20
10.	"Take It or Leave It" (lyrics: Christensen, Wastell)	4:23
11.	"Find My Way" (lyrics: Christensen, Wastell)	3:06
12.	"Two of You" (lyrics: Christensen, Wastell)	4:41
13.	"Rise and Fall" (lyrics: Christensen, Wastell)	3:24
14.	"Outro (Alexander Salamander)"	1:06
Total length:		50:39

Disc Three: Live In Aarhus '96
No.	Title	Length
1.	"Thorn In My Pride" (written by: Tim Christensen, Martin Nielsen)	3:30
2.	"Rotator"	3:56
3.	"Barbedwired Baby's Dream"	4:36
4.	"Run" (lyrics: Christensen, Nic Wastell)	4:27
5.	"When the River Runs Dry"	4:05
6.	"11:07 PM" (lyrics: Christensen, Wastell)	4:55
7.	"Glory"	4:39
8.	"Find My Way" (lyrics: Christensen, Wastell)	4:42
9.	"Medley: For God's Sake / Mother Nature's Recipe / 67 Seas In Your Eyes"	14:42
10.	"Waterline"	5:18
11.	"Alexander Salamander"	1:32
12.	"Silverflame"	5:28
13.	"Two of You" (lyrics: Christensen, Wastell)	6:28
Total length:		1:08:14

Disc Four: The Rest of Dizzy Mizz Lizzy
No.	Title	Length
1.	"Waterline" (1993 demo)	4:34
2.	"...And So Did I" (1993 demo)	4:09
3.	"Silverflame" (1993 demo)	5:02
4.	"Barbedwired Baby's Dream" (1993 demo)	3:26
5.	"Hurry Hurry" (B-side)	2:36
6.	"Pain Before My Eyes" (B-side, lyrics: Christensen, Wastell)	2:50
7.	"Barbedwired Baby's Dream" (Live in Japan)	4:00
8.	"Mother Nature's Recipe" (Live in Japan)	5:00
9.	"Silverflame" (Live in Japan)	5:09
10.	"Waterline" (Live in Japan)	6:47
11.	"67 Seas in Your Eyes" (Live in Japan)	7:02
12.	"Glory" (Live in Japan)	4:17
13.	"Back-Bone-Beat" (Live in Japan, music: Christensen, Nielsen)	4:31
Total length:		59:16

== Personnel ==
Dizzy Mizz Lizzy

- Tim Christensen – guitar, vocals, songwriter, executive producer, co-producer (disc 2 and 4), compiler (disc 4), original cover art (disc 3)
- Martin Nielsen – bass, compiler (disc 4)
- Søren Friis – drums, compiler (disc 4)

Production

- Dizzy Mizz Lizzy – arranger, compiler, mixer, producer (disc 1, 1993 demo, B-sides)
- Nick Foss – producer (disc 1, 2, B-sides, Live in Japan), mixer (disc 1–3, B-sides, Live in Japan)
- Lars Overgaard – co-producer (disc 2 and 4), engineer (disc 1 and 2), mixer (disc 1–3, B-sides, Live in Japan)
- Rune Nissen-Petersen – engineer (disc 3)
- Flemming Hansson – producer (1993 demo), mixer (1993 demo)
- Nikolaj Vinten – mastering, remastering
- Mads Nilson – recorded by (Live in Japan)
- Peter Brander – recorded by (Live In Aarhus '96)

Post-production

- Jan-Erik Stig – project manager
- Thomas Hemdorff – project manager
- Malene Garp – production
- Jan Poulsen – liner notes
- Paul Wilson – artwork, 2010 cover art
- MandOverBord – original cover art (disc 1 and 2)
- Dan Christensen – original cover art (disc 3)
- Einar vid Neyst – photography (disc 1)
- Martin Dam Kristensen – centerfold photo (disc 3)
