= Muzaik (song) =

2001 single by Infernal

Single by Infernal

from the album Waiting for Daylight
- B-side: "Arabian Sushi"
- Released: 2001
- Recorded: Infernal Studio
- Genre: Trance
- Length: 3:26
- Label: FLEX
- Songwriter(s): Infernal, Oriental Mood
- Producer(s): Infernal

Infernal singles chronology
| "Sunrise" (2000) | "Muzaik" (2001) | "You Receive Me" (2001) |

"Muzaik" is a song by the Danish dance-pop duo Infernal. It was released as the third and final single from their second studio album, Waiting for Daylight, in 2001. It was awarded "Danish Club Hit of the Year" at the 2002 Danish Music Awards.

== Track listings ==
Danish CD single
| No. | Title | Length |
|---|---|---|
| 1. | "Muzaik" (Radio) | 3:26 |
| 2. | "Muzaik" (Extended Version) | 5:06 |
| 3. | "Muzaik" (Album Version) | 7:07 |
| 4. | "Muzaik" (Tandu Remix) | 9:00 |
| 5. | "Arabian Sushi" | 5:52 |

US CD single
| No. | Title | Length |
|---|---|---|
| 1. | "Muzaik" (Radio) | 3:25 |
| 2. | "Muzaik" (Extended Version) | 5:00 |
| 3. | "Muzaik" (Paul Hutsch Remix) | 8:58 |
| 4. | "Muzaik" (Tandu Remix) | 8:58 |
| 5. | "Muzaik" (Album Version) | 7:00 |

== Credits and personnel ==
- Written by Infernal, Oriental Mood
- Produced and arranged by Infernal
- Recorded by Infernal at the Infernal Studio
- Mixed by Infernal
- Instruments by Infernal
- Percussion by Lars Bo Kujahn and Frank Juul
- Vocals by Infernal
- Additional vocals by Oriental Mood
- Additional drum programming by Kjeld Tolstrup
- Mastered by Michael Pfundheller @ Flex Studio
- "Muzaik" (Tandu Remix): remixed by DJ Tandu
- "Arabian Sushi": written by Infernal. Produced and arranged by Infernal. Recorded and mixed by Infernal @ the Infernal Studio. Additional keyboards and percussion by Peter Düring. Kavala by Yasar Tas

== Charts ==
| Chart (2001) | Peak position |
|---|---|
| Danish Singles Chart | 5 |
