= Voodoo Cowboy =

Single by Infernal

from the album Infernal Affairs
- Released: 1998
- Genre: Eurodance
- Length: 3:24
- Label: FLEX
- Songwriter(s): Infernal, Peter Beim
- Producer(s): Infernal, E.T.A.

Infernal singles chronology
"Kalinka" (1998)	"Voodoo Cowboy" (1998)	"Your Crown" (1999)

"Voodoo Cowboy" is a song by the Danish dance-pop duo Infernal. It was released as the fourth single from their debut album, Infernal Affairs, in 1998.

== Track listings ==
Danish CD single
No.	Title	Length
1.	"Voodoo Cowboy" (Radio Mix)	3:24
2.	"Voodoo Cowboy" (Infernal's Radio-Club Mix)	3:45
3.	"Voodoo Cowboy" (Aliens Ate My C-C-Countryclub Mix)	6:44
4.	"Voodoo Cowboy" (Infernal's Club Mix)	5:29
5.	"Voodoo Cowboy" (Original Mix)	4:25

UK promo CD single
No.	Title	Length
1.	"Voodoo Cowboy" (Original Mix)	4:25
2.	"Voodoo Cowboy" (Soul of Man Instrumental Mix)	5:18
3.	"Voodoo Cowboy" (Soul of Man Vocal Mix)	6:10
4.	"Voodoo Cowboy" (Radio Edit)	3:24

UK vinyl single
No.	Title	Length
1.	"Voodoo Cowboy" (Soul of Man Instrumental Mix)
2.	"Voodoo Cowboy" (Soul of Man Vocal Mix)
3.	"Voodoo Cowboy" (Original Mix)

== Credits and personnel ==
- Music and lyrics written by Infernal and Peter Beim
- All tracks produced, mixed and arranged by Infernal and E.T.A.
- Mastered by Michael Pfundheller
- Executive producer: Kenneth Bager
- "Voodoo Cowboy" (Aliens Ate My C-C-Countryclub Mix): additional remix and production by Kjeld Tolstrup and N. Steen

== Charts ==
Chart (1998)	Peak position
Danish Singles Chart	12
