= Dizzy Mizz Lizzy (album) =

Studio album by Dizzy Mizz Lizzy
- Released: 4 March 1994
- Recorded: 1993/1994; Focus studio (Copenhagen); Grapehouse studio (Copenhagen)
- Genres: Grunge; Alternative rock Power rock
- Length: 54:50
- Label: EMI-Medley
- Producers: Nick Foss, Dizzy Mizz Lizzy

Dizzy Mizz Lizzy chronology
Dizzy Mizz Lizzy (1994)	Rotator (1996)

Dizzy Mizz Lizzy is the debut studio album by Danish rock band Dizzy Mizz Lizzy, released on 4 March 1994 by EMI-Medley. The album followed the success of the band's 1993 demo, whose songs "Waterline" and "Silverflame" received substantial Danish radio airplay before the album was recorded.

The album was a major commercial success in Denmark. It sold more than 100,000 copies within six months of its release and had reached 180,000 copies by 1996, when it was described as the fastest-selling Danish debut album. It was also released in Japan, where it sold about 100,000 copies. At the 1995 Danish Grammys, Dizzy Mizz Lizzy received four awards, including Danish group of the year, newcomer of the year and rock album of the year. The album was remastered and reissued in 2010 as part of the Dizzcography box set.

== Reception ==
Before the album was even recorded, the songs "Waterline" and "Silverflame" from the band's 1993 demo received heavy rotation on radio stations, including DR P3 and DR P4. "Waterline" became the banner anthem for the grunge wave that hit Denmark, even though the band thought it was one of the least obvious songs to become a hit. Because the demo was only in limited circulation, the album was pre-ordered by over 7,000 fans. Despite a growing demand, the band took some time in search of the right label to represent them. They rejected several foreign offers before being contracted to EMI-Medley by Nick Foss, whom they knew from his work as producer for D-A-D and The Sandmen. They went into the studio with Foss for three months. Lead singer and guitarist Tim Christensen recalls: "We were very nervous, even when we went into the studio to record. We have continually received positive criticism, so we felt that there was a huge burden on our shoulders."

In two months' time following the 4 March 1994 release, it won a gold record for having sold over 40,000 copies; two months later it won platinum, and another two months later sales had exceeded 100,000 copies. By 1996, sales were up to 180,000 copies, by which time it was the fastest-selling Danish debut ever. To date it has sold over 250,000 copies in Denmark, a sales record that still stands and is good for 5× Platinum. The album was well received and described as "Paul McCartney meeting Led Zeppelin in Seattle", although others were more critical, putting it as "A record and a band that have not added anything new to rock music, but who nevertheless have set completely different standards for Danish rock," especially in terms of the music becoming louder. Its success "only tolerates national comparison with the merits of Gasolin' in the 1970s and the international adoration of Aqua". A review in the Danish music magazine GAFFA described it as:

The eagerly awaited debut is breathtaking, as even the sourest stomach acid will declare. The record is a long display of a genuine joy in playing and an unspoiled love for heavy rock.

It all heavily oozes Led Zeppelin and Seattle, but the trio wants, and inexplicably even manages it, to create their own musical identity. They do it primarily through of a series of bulletproof melodies that are lifting the heavy tones up the heights where trumpet-playing angels usually provide the musical entertainment. It's simply a relief to hear such a young rock band, who both can and dare write pretty banal tunes.

Although the band might run a little generously over the same melodies, Dizzy Mizz Lizzy the most promising rock debut in Denmark in many, many years.

—Jan Poulsen, GAFFA

By accident the CD ended up with Hans Otto Bisgård of EMI's Japanese division, who was excited about the album and had it released in Japan where it became a success and sold about 100,000 copies. Five singles were released from the album and all got much radio play: "Silverflame", "Barbedwired Baby's Dream", "Love Is a Loser's Game", "Glory" and "Waterline". The band went on a tour through much of Western Europe and played 3 sold-out shows in the Japanese cities Sapporo, Osaka and Tokyo. In 1995, the album garnered the band four Danish Grammys for Danish group of the year, Danish newcomer of the year, Danish rock album of the year, and the People's choice award.

== Cover art ==
The cover art was designed by MandOverBord. About the girl, Christensen explains: "The photo is from around 1920. It depicts the older sister of my grandmother on mother's side. She died around the age of 12-14 of tuberculosis. Her real name is Vera. There are two or three copies of the photo in my family. I have one hanging in my apartment. The same photo hung in my home, and when we were searching for a cover for our first release (the 1993 promo), we felt it was a great idea to use the picture of her as a sort of mascot or logo." The picture was reused for the cover of Dizzy Mizz Lizzy and also appears on several of the band's compilation albums and their 2016 studio album Forward in Reverse.

== Remaster ==
The album was re-released on 29 March 2010 as part of the Dizzcography box set. It was digitally remastered by Nikolaj Vinten who had also mastered the album in 1994. A remaster of the Japanese bonus track "Hurry Hurry" was included on another disc in the box set, which also includes the 1993 demos. In the track listing, "Waterline Intro" was merged into "Waterline". The cover art had completely been redrawn by Paul Wilson of Yellow1 because the original designs by MandOverBord had not been saved. The backdrop of the new front cover (shown on the right) shows clear differences, the yellow lettering is brighter, while there are darker shadows in the girl's face. The print on the disc is more modern, and the booklet has been modified and expanded with liner notes by Jan Poulsen, although it was strongly inspired by the original and contains the same photography by Einar vid Neyst. The packaging has changed from jewel case to Digipak.

The remasters of the 2010 reissue sparked a wave of downloads of the album and of individual songs from the iTunes Store and inspired the Danish producer and DJ Morten Breum to release a remix of "Waterline" on 5 April 2010.

== Track listing ==
All tracks are written by Tim Christensen, except where noted.

Dizzy Mizz Lizzy
No.	Title	Length
1.	"Waterline Intro"	0:29
2.	"Waterline"	4:03
3.	"Barbedwired Baby's Dream"	3:07
4.	"Love Is a Loser's Game"	3:47
5.	"Glory"	3:47
6.	"67 Seas in Your Eyes"	4:38
7.	"Silverflame"	5:12
8.	"Love Me a Little" (lyrics: Tim Christensen, Thomas Rockwell)	4:01
9.	"Mother Nature's Recipe"	3:06
10.	"...And So Did I"	4:41
11.	"Wishing Well"	3:34
12.	"Hidden War" (lyrics: Christensen, Rockwell)	4:44
13.	"For God's Sake"	3:55
14.	"Too Close to Stab" (lyrics: Christensen, Rockwell)	5:10
Total length:		54:50

Japan bonus track
No.	Title	Length
15.	"Hurry Hurry"	2:36

== Singles ==
- "Silverflame"
- "Barbedwired Baby's Dream"
- "Love Is a Loser's Game"
- "Glory"
- "Waterline"

== Personnel ==
Dizzy Mizz Lizzy

- Tim Christensen – guitar, vocals, songwriter
- Martin Nielsen – bass
- Søren Friis – drums

Production

- Nick Foss – producer, mixer
- Lars Overgaard – engineer, mastering, mixer
- MandOverBord – cover art
- Einar vid Neyst – photography

== Certifications ==
Region	Certification	Certified units/sales
Denmark (IFPI Danmark)	13× Platinum	260,000^{‡}
^{‡} Sales+streaming figures based on certification alone.
