= Live in Concert 2010 =

Live album by Dizzy Mizz Lizzy
- Released: 8 November 2010
- Recorded: 16–17 April 2010
- Genres: Grunge, alternative rock
- Length: 1:34:18
- Labels: ArtPeople, King Records (Japan)
- Producer: Theis Molin

Dizzy Mizz Lizzy chronology
Dizzcography (2010)	Live in Concert 2010 (2010)	Forward in Reverse (2016)

Live in Concert 2010 is the second live album by the Danish power rock band Dizzy Mizz Lizzy. Recorded at the K.B. Hallen on 16–17 April 2010, it documents the band's finale of their 2010 reunion tour. Performing at this venue has a special connotation to the band members, who grew up nearby and saw concerts of their musical heroes growing up. The original building was destroyed by a fire 1.5 years later. The album was released on 8 November 2010 as 2CD/DVD and 2CD/Blu-ray. In Japan, it was released on 27 April on King Records. and includes a sticker sheet and liner notes by Masa Ito.

Part of the release is the 80-minute documentary Lost Inside a Dream: The Story of Dizzy Mizz Lizzy, which premiered at the Copenhagen International Documentary Festival (CPH:DOX) on 4 November 2010, where it won the Politiken Publikumspris (people's choice award). It features footage from Dizzy Mizz Lizzy shows from the 1980s and 1990s, home videos, events revolving around the band's reunion in 2009 and the ensuing 2010 tour, and individual interviews with the band members. The documentary's title is the first line to the lyrics of the band's song "Barbedwired Baby's Dream". It is dedicated to Lars Overgaard who engineered, mixed and mastered both of Dizzy Mizz Lizzy's studio albums, and co-produced both their compilations. He died on 7 August 2010. Both the concert and the documentary have been directed by the Danish film maker Theis Molin.

== Track listing ==
All tracks are written by Tim Christensen, except where noted.

Disc One
No.	Title	Length
1.	"Intro"	1:11
2.	"Thorn in my Pride" (written by: Tim Christensen, Martin Nielsen)	3:08
3.	"Glory"	5:20
4.	"Find My Way" (lyrics: Christensen, Nic Wastell)	3:07
5.	"Barbedwired Baby's Dream"	3:52
6.	"For God's Sake"	2:41
7.	"Mother Nature's Recipe"	4:26
8.	"Hidden War" (lyrics: Christensen, Thomas Rockwell)	4:56
9.	"When the River Runs Dry"	3:57
10.	"And So Did I"	4:14
11.	"Rotator"	3:27
12.	"Run" (lyrics: Christensen, Wastell)	5:35
13.	"Love Is a Loser's Game"	4:06
Total length:		49:55

Disc Two
No.	Title	Length
1.	"11:07 pm" (lyrics: Christensen, Wastell)	4:50
2.	"Wishing Well"	3:43
3.	"67 Seas in Your Eyes"	11:28
4.	"Waterline"	5:22
5.	"Love Me a Little" (lyrics: Christensen, Rockwell)	4:24
6.	"Silverflame"	6:38
7.	"Two of You" (lyrics: Christensen, Wastell)	8:00
Total length:		44:23

== Personnel ==
Dizzy Mizz Lizzy

- Tim Christensen – guitar, vocals, songwriter
- Martin Nielsen – bass
- Søren Friis – drums

Post-production

- Theis Molin – director, producer
- Jesper Kodahl Andersen – editor, online/grading
- Rune Nissen-Petersen – mixer, live sound mix
- Nikolaj Vinten – mastering
- Peter Schiøtz – audio post production
- Paul Wilson – graphic design, artwork

Recording

- Jan Pallesen – director of photography
- Lars Bonde – photographer
- Martin Top – photographer
- Dror Kasinsky – photographer
- Thomas Gerhardt – photographer
- Christoffer Dines Dreyer – photographer
- Bo Dalum – photographer
- Ian Hansen – photographer
- Claus Mølbæk – teko / Robocam
- Martin Østervang – assistant teko
- Simon Hilden – camera assistant
- Jimmy Leavens – grip
- Jens Olesen – grip assistant
- Henrik Thomsen – grip assistant
- Emil Sauer – sound mix assistant
- Jørgen Bo Behrensdorff – live sound recording

Additional crew

- Claus Christensen – still photographer
- Bo Thornvig – still photographer
- Andreas Molin Nielsen – still photographer
- Anja Wejs Phigalt – production manager
- Lars Moroh – production manager
- Henrik Seifert – management, booking

Live crew

- Mif Damgaard – head of production, tour manager
- Jens Qvistgaard – production manager
- Paul Hammann – FOH engineer
- Daniel Devantier – monitor engineer
- Theis Romme – sound technician
- Michael Madsen – sound technician
- Mads Birkebæk – sound technician
- Arild Nordgaard – guitar technician
- Rasmus Salskov – drum technician
- Kasper Lange – lighting designer
- Karsten Sørensen – lighting technician
- Balder Thorrud – lighting technician
- Jørgen Barfoed – head rigger
