= Sunrise (Infernal song) =

Single by Infernal

from the album Waiting for Daylight
- Released: 2000
- Genre: Eurodance
- Length: 3:30
- Label: FLEX
- Songwriter(s): Tim Christensen, Lagermann, Rafn, De La Ray, Adam Powers
- Producer(s): Infernal, DJ Aligator

Infernal singles chronology
"Serengeti" (2000)	"Sunrise" (2000)	"Muzaik" (2001)

"Sunrise" is a song by the Danish dance-pop duo Infernal. It was released as the second single from their second studio album, Waiting for Daylight, in 2000. The song samples the 1994 song "Silverflame" from the Danish alternative rock band Dizzy Mizz Lizzy.

== Track listings ==
Danish CD single
No.	Title	Length
1.	"Sunrise" (Radio)	3:58
2.	"Sunrise" (Extended)	7:48
3.	"Sunrise" (Club Mix)	7:10
4.	"Sunrise" (Fairlite Rmx)	8:29
5.	"Sunrise" (Krystal Rmx)	7:22
6.	"Sunrise" (Alternative Radio)	3:29

Netherlands vinyl single
No.	Title	Length
1.	"Sunrise" (Krystal Mix)	7:21
2.	"Sunrise" (Fairlite Mix)	8:28
3.	"Sunrise" (Clubmix)	7:09
4.	"Sunrise" (Extended)	7:47

== Credits and personnel ==
- Written by Tim Christensen, Infernal, De La Ray, Adam Powers
- Vocals by Lina Rafn, Moses Malone and Susanne Carstensen
- All instruments by Infernal, except guitar by Steen Grøntved, darbuka by Lars Bo Kujahn
- Additional keyboards by Michael Pfundheller
- Produced by Infernal
- Co-produced by DJ Aligator
- Arranged by Infernal, except track 2 arranged by Infernal and DJ Aligator
- Mixed by Infernal and Mark Hannibal @ Funk Yard Sound Studio
- Mastered by Jan Eliasson @ Tocano
- Executive producer: Kenneth Bager

== Charts ==
Chart (2000)	Peak position
Danish Singles Chart	6
