= Infernal Affairs (album) =

Studio album by Infernal
- Released: 1998
- Recorded: 1997
- Genre: Trance, Eurodance
- Length: 53:33
- Label: FLEX
- Producer: Infernal, Kristian Paulsen, Kenneth Bager (also exec.), Michael Pfundheller, Jesper Christiansen

Infernal chronology
Infernal Affairs (1998)	Remixed Affairs (1998)

Singles from Infernal Affairs
- 1. "Sorti de L'enfer" Released: 1997; 2. "Highland Fling" Released: 1998; 3. "Kalinka" Released: 1998; 4. "Voodoo Cowboy" Released: 1998; 5. "Your Crown" Released: 1999; 6. "Disc Jockey Polka" Released: 1999

Professional ratings
Review scores
Source	Rating
GAFFA	2/6 stars

Infernal Affairs is the debut album by the Danish dance act Infernal, released in 1998 in Denmark. It became an unexpected success, selling more than 80,000 copies (two-times platinum). The album was awarded Danish Upfront Dance Release of the Year at the 1999 Danish Grammy Awards.

== Track listing ==
No.	Title	Writer(s)	Producer(s)	Length
1.	"Sorti de L'enfer"	Infernal, Kristian Paulsen	Infernal, Kristian Paulsen	6:22
2.	"Voodoo Cowboy"	Infernal, Peter Beim	Infernal, ETA	4:25
3.	"Kalinka"	Infernal	Infernal	5:47
4.	"L'amour est Interdit"	Infernal, Al Agami, Jan Langhoff, Peter Hartmann	Infernal	3:23
5.	"Destruction"	Infernal	Infernal	5:14
6.	"Your Crown"	Nosie Katzmann	Infernal, Kenneth Bager, Michael Pfundheller	5:12
7.	"Disc Jockey Polka"	Infernal, Jesper Christiansen	Infernal, Jesper Q.	4:28
8.	"Highland Fling"	Infernal	Infernal	6:10
9.	"Hammond Prince"	Infernal	Infernal	4:52
10.	"Loch Ness"	Infernal, Bernard Bouhadana, Jeffrey D. Jensen	Infernal	4:55

== Charts and certifications ==
=== Album ===
Chart (1998–1999)	Peak position	Certifications (sales thresholds)	Sales
Danish Albums Chart	6	2× Platinum	80,000+
Danish End of Year Albums Chart	53	2× Platinum	80,000+

=== Singles ===
Year	Song	Peak positions
Year	Song	DEN
1997	"Sorti de L'enfer"	20
1998	"Highland Fling"	11
1998	"Kalinka"	19
1998	"Voodoo Cowboy"	12
1999	"Your Crown"	—
1999	"Disc Jockey Polka" (promotional)	—
"—" denotes releases that did not chart.
