= Serengeti (song) =

2000 single by Infernal

Single by Infernal

from the album Waiting for Daylight
- B-side: "Electric Midnight"
- Released: 2000
- Genre: Trance
- Length: 3:30
- Label: FLEX
- Songwriter(s): Lagermann, Rafn, De La Ray, Moses Malone
- Producer(s): Infernal, De La Ray

Infernal singles chronology
"Your Crown" (1999)	"Serengeti" (2000)	"Sunrise" (2000)

"Serengeti" is a song by the Danish dance-pop duo Infernal. It was released as the lead single from their second studio album, Waiting for Daylight, in 2000.

== Track listings ==
Danish CD single
No.	Title	Length
1.	"Serengeti" (Radio Mix)	3:30
2.	"Serengeti" (Club Mix)	8:43
3.	"Serengeti" (Original Mix)	9:00
4.	"Serengeti" (Double T Exotic Club Mix)	8:45
5.	"Serengeti" (Orchestral World Groove Dub)	8:08
6.	"Electric Midnight"	8:16

US vinyl single
No.	Title	Length
1.	"Serengeti" (Original Mix)	9:00
2.	"Serengeti" (Azzido Mix)	9:40
3.	"Serengeti" (Club Mix)	8:43
4.	"Serengeti" (Double T Exotic Club Mix)	8:45
5.	"Serengeti" (Orchestral World Groove Dub)	6:05

== Credits and personnel ==
- Written by Infernal, De La Ray, Moses Malone
- Produced and arranged by Infernal and De La Ray
- Mixed at Infernal Studio
- Vocals by Paw, Moses Malone
- All instruments by Infernal, De La Ray
- Additional vocal production by Michael Pfundheller
- Mastered by Michael Pfundheller at Flex Studio
- Executive producer: Kenneth Bager
- "Electric Midnight": written, produced and arranged by Infernal
- "Serengeti" (Azzido Mix): remixed by Infernal and Kenneth Bager
- "Serengeti" (Double T Exotic Club Mix): remixed by Kjeld Tolstrup and Morten Trøst. Additional keyboards by Sune Kempf. Mixed at Sunzet Studio
- "Serengeti" (Orchestral World Groove Dub): remixed by Pathaan and Gaudi. Mixed at Metatron Studio London
