= Your Crown =

Single by Infernal featuring Xenia

from the album Infernal Affairs
- Released: 1999
- Genre: Trance
- Length: 4:09
- Label: FLEX
- Songwriter(s): Nosie Katzmann
- Producer(s): Infernal, Michael Pfundheller, Kenneth Bager

Infernal singles chronology
"Voodoo Cowboy" (1998)	"Your Crown" (1999)	"Serengeti" (2000)

"Your Crown" is a song by the Danish dance-pop duo Infernal. It features the Danish singer and actress Xenia Lach-Nielsen, and was released as the fifth single from Infernal's debut album, Infernal Affairs, in 1999. The song is written by the German songwriter Nosie Katzmann, and it is the only Infernal single ever to feature a different female lead vocalist than Lina Rafn. It peaked at No. 2 on the Danish Airplay Chart, making it the most successful single from the album in terms of airplay.

== Track listing ==
Danish CD single
No.	Title	Length
1.	"Your Crown" (Radio Mix)	4:09
2.	"Your Crown" (Club Mix)	7:41
3.	"Your Crown" (Pasta People's Whirl It Up Mix)	8:35

Danish promo vinyl
No.	Title	Length
1.	"Your Crown" (Krystal Vocal Remix)
2.	"Your Crown" (Krystal Dub Mix)

== Personnel ==
- Music and lyrics written by Nosie Katzmann
- Lyrics performed by Xenia
- Original production by Infernal, Michael Pfundheller, Kenneth Bager
- "Your Crown" (Radio Mix) and (Club Mix): Remix and additional production by Michael Pfundheller
- "Your Crown" (Pasta People's Whirl It Up Mix): Remix and additional production by Michael Parsberg and Jakob Stavnstrup
- Mastered by Michael Pfundheller
- Executive producer: Kenneth Bager
