= Kalinka (Infernal song) =

Single by Infernal

from the album Infernal Affairs
- Released: 1998
- Genre: Eurodance
- Length: 3:13
- Label: FLEX Club
- Songwriter: Infernal
- Producer: Infernal

Infernal singles chronology
| "Highland Fling" (1998) | "Kalinka" (1998) | "Voodoo Cowboy" (1998) |

"Kalinka" is a song by the Danish dance-pop duo Infernal. It was released as the third single from their debut album, Infernal Affairs, in 1998. The song is based on the Russian Drobushki folk melody, and samples "Kalinka" by the Soviet Army Chorus & Band, directed by Boris Alexandrov and recorded in 1956 and 1963.

It has become Infernal's signature song from their early eurodance period (1997–2003), and when the song is performed at one of their concerts, they encourage the audience to perform the "kosak" dance.

== Track listing ==
| No. | Title | Length |
|---|---|---|
| 1. | "Kalinka" (Kosak Radio Mix) | 3:13 |
| 2. | "Kalinka" (Vodka Ad Libitum Club Mix) | 7:43 |
| 3. | "Kalinka" (Na Storovye Album Mix) | 5:49 |

== Credits and personnel ==
- Music and lyrics written by Infernal
- Lyrics performed by Søren Haahr and Lina Rafn
- Produced, mixed and arranged by Infernal
- Mastered by Michael Pfundheller
- Executive producer: Kenneth Bager

== Charts ==
| Chart (1998) | Peak position |
|---|---|
| Danish Singles Chart | 19 |
