= Waiting for Daylight (Infernal album) =

Studio album by Infernal
- Released: 2000
- Genre: Trance, euro house, downtempo
- Length: 51:54
- Label: FLEX

Infernal chronology
Remixed Affairs (1998)	Waiting for Daylight (2000)	Muzaik (2001)

Singles from Waiting for Daylight
- 1. "Serengeti" Released: 2000; 2. "Sunrise" Released: 2000; 3. "Muzaik" Released: 2001

Waiting for Daylight is the third album and second studio album by the Danish dance/pop act Infernal, released in 2000 in Denmark. It was later released as Muzaik in 2001, with a more pop music-oriented sound and a few bonus tracks.

== Track listing ==
No.	Title	Writer(s)	Producer(s)	Length
1.	"Intro: Serengeti" (Bliss mix)	Paw Lagermann, Lina Rafn, De La Ray, Moses Malone	Infernal	5:05
2.	"Serengeti"	Lagermann, Rafn, De La Ray, Malone	Infernal, De La Ray	3:46
3.	"Sunrise"	Tim Christensen, Lagermann, Rafn, De La Ray, Adam Powers	Infernal, Ali Movasat (co.)	3:34
4.	"Turkish Bizarre"	Lagermann, Rafn, Kawkab Hamza	Infernal	3:55
5.	"Humbled by Nature"	Lagermann, Rafn, Powers, Malone	Infernal	4:39
6.	"Living Under Water"	Lagermann, Rafn, Malone	Infernal	4:33
7.	"Muzaik"	Lagermann, Rafn, Oriental Mood	Infernal	3:37
8.	"Adeel"	Lagermann, Rafn, Malone	Infernal	3:32
9.	"Electric Midnight"	Lagermann, Rafn, Malone	Infernal	3:28
10.	"Desert Poem"	Lagermann, Rafn, Ray, Hamza	Infernal, De La Ray	3:39
11.	"Mizkett"	Lagermann, Rafn	Infernal	4:08

== Singles ==
Name	Released	Writer	Producer	Chart position
"Serengeti"	2000			#? (Denmark)
"Serengeti" is the first single from the album.
"Sunrise"	2000	Tim Christensen, Paw Lagerman, Lina Rafn, Adam Powers, De La Ray		#6 (Denmark)
"Sunrise" is the second single from the album.
"Muzaik"	2001	Paw Lagerman, Lina Rafn, F. Juul, L. Kujahn	Paw Lagerman, Lina Rafn	#5 (Denmark)
"Muzaik" is the third single from the album. It became their most successful single from the album.
"You Receive Me"	2001			#12 (Denmark)
"You Receive Me" is the fourth single from the album.
"Let Me Hear You Say Yeah"	2001			#11 (Denmark)
"Let Me Hear You Say Yeah" is the fifth and final single from the album.
