= Rotator (album) =

Studio album by Dizzy Mizz Lizzy
- Released: 24 May 1996
- Recorded: 1995/1996; Abbey Road Studios (London); Grapehouse studio (Copenhagen)
- Genre: Grunge; Alternative rock Power rock
- Length: 50:30
- Label: EMI-Casadida
- Producer: Nick Foss, Dizzy Mizz Lizzy

Dizzy Mizz Lizzy chronology
Dizzy Mizz Lizzy (1994)	Rotator (1996)	The Best of Dizzy Mizz Lizzy (2002)

Rotator is the second studio album released by the Danish rock band Dizzy Mizz Lizzy. After touring the album, the band broke up, making this their last studio album released until Forward in Reverse in 2016.

== Background ==
Although the record-breaking successes of their eponymous debut album weighed heavy on the still teenage band members, who were not prepared for what comes with the success, the band did not perceive it to pressure them musically. The band did not attempt to create songs that resembled the ones from the former record, and assumed that choice would not be a complete fiasco, given their continued success.

Rotator is heavier and less carefree than its predecessor, with a hint of bitterness especially in regard to the state of the music industry. As lead singer Tim Christensen explains: "There are several songs about the [music] industry. One song for example describes how you should first do well before they take you in from the cold. Nobody makes it from the start; they must smell the money. We are the cause that other bands have had the problem that the record label tells them, 'Now that Dizzy is running so well, we won't be taking in other bands.' It embarrasses us a bit, but cannot do anything about it." Drummer Søren Friis elaborates: "One can actually take ourselves as an example, as we first had to win the Danish Rock Competition before it happened." Bassist Martin Nielsen clarifies, "The songs aren't about how bad we have it, but mostly about how bad the business can be sometimes."

The song "11:07 PM" is about the death of John Lennon, an event which has had a profound impact on Christensen, even though he was only six years old at the time. The title of the song refers to a presumed time of death.

On this album, Nic Wastell, an Englishman, corrected some of the lyrics. "The idea came from both myself and from our label, because I am fairly lazy when it comes to writing lyrics. Since we had recorded all the music, I could see that some of the lyrics weren't entirely complete," says Christensen.

== Studio struggles and the band's demise ==
EMI-Medley head of A&R and producer Nick Foss had made an agreement with lead singer and guitarist Tim Christensen that if their debut album Dizzy Mizz Lizzy sold gold (equal to 40,000 copies at that time), the next would be recorded at the legendary Abbey Road Studios in London, which it did in 2 months' time, and would continue to sell 5× platinum. As a result, Rotator was recorded in the same studios The Beatles had recorded in, which was Christensen's boyhood dream, and which he repeated in 2004 when playing and recording a solo live show there.

While recording at the Abbey Road Studios, it turned out the other band members did not share Christensen's enthusiasm, nor could they appreciate the unique symbolism recording in these legendary studios as much as Christensen, who found he had no one to share his palette of emotions with. It caused him to turn to Pernille Rosendahl, his girlfriend since 1995, in and out of the studio. This further added to the crisis and caused Christensen to become increasingly estranged from the band. Nielsen and Friis even went as far as labeling the couple as "John and Yoko", referring to the supposed detrimental influence of Yoko Ono on John Lennon that contributed to the break-up of the Beatles. This period furthermore showed the first signs of the band members heading in different musical directions, about which Christensen explained in 2000: "I needed change while the others wanted to continue in the same style, and that was actually the most important reason we split up." This can especially be heard in the song "Rise and Fall"; although songs were always a collaborative effort by the band, Christensen requested Nielsen and Friis to allow him to be in full control over this song, and as a result it is distinctly different from all other songs on the album.

In pursuit of the album's release, they played on festivals in Denmark, Norway and Germany, and went to Japan in September 1996 for shows in Tokyo (2×), Sapporo, Osaka, Nagoya and Fukuoka. In Denmark, they played dozens of shows which fatigued both the band and the fans, while the problems that arose during the recording of Rotator also pursued the band on tour. After five years of non stop recording and touring and having lost touch with reality, the band decided to take a sabbatical in 1997. They worked on some demos in January 1998, but did not find the band dynamics revitalized, and the trio decided to split up on 10 March 1998 while discussing their future in the Rosenborg Castle Gardens. The split occurred amidst a wave of prominent Danish bands disbanding. Critics would later explain their decision as the band having the courage to stop in time despite enormous success, although it was largely due to fatigue that the trio could not bring themselves to continuing to play. Their tastes in music had also become less compatible, with Christensen wanting a more vintage Beatles-like sound and Nielsen and Friis preferring to make heavy metal music.

== Reception ==
The album reached gold status the very day it went on sale on 24 May 1996, and they appeared to have lived up to the notorious expectations of creating a worthy sequel to their debut album. It sold 100,000 copies in Denmark, "which is exceptionally high for a guitar rock album in Denmark" and was good for double platinum, but it could not match the commercial success of its predecessor by a long shot. In Japan, another 100,000 copies were sold. Reviews were generally positive; GAFFA described it as "a solid bastion of a publication," with which "Dizzy Mizz Lizzy really set new high standards for trio-rock – both in terms of musicality and finesse." It was however considered a bit too polished, with "rapid tight rhythm shifts, pulsating beats, and tight guitar riffs [so that] one sometimes wonders why the band did not allow themselves a little more room for spontaneity, and just let go in the practice room and in their timing, because although the band has plenty of personality, it lacks an actual outbreak amidst all the rehearsed style exercises." The album won the 1997 Danish Grammy for "Rock Album of the Year" and Nick Foss received the prize for "Best Producer". The singles "11:07 PM" and "Rotator" became hits in Denmark.

== Remastering ==
The album was re-released on 29 March 2010 as part of the Dizzcography box set. It was digitally remastered by Nikolaj Vinten who had also mastered the album in 1996. A remaster of the Japanese bonus track "Pain Before My Eyes" was included on another disc in the box set. The track listing remained unchanged. The cover art had completely been redrawn by Paul Wilson of Yellow1 because the original designs by MandOverBord had not been saved. The booklet was expanded with liner notes by Jan Poulsen. The packaging has changed from jewel case to Digipak.

== Track listing ==
All tracks are written by Tim Christensen, except where noted

Rotator
No.	Title	Length
1.	"Thorn In My Pride" (written by: Tim Christensen / Martin Nielsen)	3:07
2.	"Run" (lyrics: Christensen / Nic Wastell)	4:06
3.	"Rotator"	3:30
4.	"11:07 PM" (lyrics: Christensen / Wastell)	4:09
5.	"Back-Bone-Beat" (lyrics: Christensen / Wastell, music: Christensen / Nielsen)	4:39
6.	"When the River Runs Dry"	3:50
7.	"Break"	4:05
8.	"I Like Surprises" (lyrics: Christensen / Wastell)	3:12
9.	"Riff Sang"	3:20
10.	"Take It or Leave It" (lyrics: Christensen / Wastell)	4:21
11.	"Find My Way" (lyrics: Christensen / Wastell)	3:06
12.	"Two of You" (lyrics: Christensen / Wastell)	4:39
13.	"Rise and Fall" (lyrics: Christensen / Wastell)	3:20
14.	"Outro"	0:57
Total length:		50:30

Japan bonus track
No.	Title	Length
15.	"Pain Before My Eyes"	2:50

== Singles ==
- "Rotator" (1996), EMI-Medley
- "11:07 PM" (1996), EMI-Medley

== Personnel ==
Dizzy Mizz Lizzy

- Tim Christensen – guitar, vocals, songwriter, co-producer
- Martin Nielsen – bass
- Søren Friis – drums

Production

- Nick Foss – producer, mixer
- Lars Overgaard – engineer, mastering, mixer, co-producer
- MandOverBord – cover art
