= The Sandmen =

Danish rock band

- Origin: Copenhagen, Denmark
- Genres: Rock
- Years active: 1985–1995; 2003–present
- Labels: Garden Records, A&M Records, EMI, Universal
- Members: Allan Vegenfeldt; Michael Illo Rasmussen; Stefan Moulvad
- Past members: Ole Wennike (until 2011); Stefan Jensen; Sam Mitchell; Anders Poulsen
- Website: www.thesandmen.dk

The Sandmen is a Danish rock band that was formed in Copenhagen in 1985. The band broke up in 1995, but was reunited in 2003 on the occasion of the release of the compilation album Beauties and Beasts. In 2006 they revived releasing their studio album, the first in over a decade called White Trash Red Front, their biggest success. In 2014, the band has become a trio formation of Allan Vegenfeldt, Michael Illo Rasmussen and Stefan Moulvad with a new release Den Bedste dag and a new departure for the band in its first album in Danish after 8 albums in English. 2019 saw the release of yet another album In danish language: Himmelstormer

== Original phase ==
Originally The Sandmen consisted of Allan Vegenfeldt on vocals, Stefan Jensen, Ole Wennike and Michael Illo Rasmussen. They released their materials on Garden Records. Guitarist Sam Mitchell joined The Sandmen in 1988, before releasing the album Western Blood. In 1989, the group had a hit with the song "House in the Country" from the American version of Western Blood released a year later.

The Sandmen were included in record label A & M Records with a promotional tour in the United States. Gimme Gimme, the band's third album was recorded in place in Malmö, Sweden and shelving of materials recorded earlier in London. The album became one of the first examples of classic rock fused with the twisted late-80s Manchester-wave in the style of Happy Mondays.

Stefan Jensen left the band in 1992 just before signing with EMI and recording of Sleepyhead. The album helped the band to be an established name in Denmark. The 1994 album In The House of Secrets added a "jazzy" side with improvisations. "Slave Song" from that album has become a huge live favourite tune. The band broke up in 1995.

Ole Wennike, Allan Vegenfeldt then formed the band Nerve together with The Law guitarist Stefan Moulvad and Morten Hansen and Alex Puddu (from Puddu Varano). After an EP and an album that band also split up.

== Reunion and revival ==
Release of the compilation album Beauties and Beasts in 2003 was an occasion for reuniting, but without guitar player Sam Mitchell, who had been struck by illness. The band now consisted of : Allan Vegenfeldt, Ole Wennike, Michael Illo Rasmussen and Stefan Moulvad. On 15 June 2006 Sam Mitchell died at the age of 56.

In 2006, White Trash Red Front became their highest charting album and a first album after a break for a full decade. The ballad "Wouldn't Mind at All" became a radio hit. Influences included pop, garage rock and psychedelic / improvisational rock.

In May 2008, the band recorded in Gothenburg the critically acclaimed album Shine. The band toured until mid-2009, when members decided to take time off for personal projects. In 2011, bassist Ole Wennike left the band for unknown reasons. Allan Vegenfeldt, Michael Illo Rasmussen and Stefan Moulvad decided to continue the cooperation. Bass player Jens Hein and keyboard player Palle Hjorth were added subsequently for live gigs and were part of the release, the 2014 album Den bedste dag. In 2016-17 the band worked on material for the 2019 release Himmelstormer again collaborating with Jens Hein and now also guitarist and harpist Jarno Varsted. Both have continued to be close musical partners with the band writing and recording as Well as live on stage

== Members ==
Original line-up (1985)

- Allan Vegenfeldt (born 1964) - vocals
- Stefan Jensen (born 1962) - guitar (left in 1992)
- Ole Wennike (born 1958) - bass, harmonica (left In 2009)
- Michael Illo Rasmussen (born 1959) - drummer

Others

- Sam Mitchell (1950-2006) - guitar (joined in 1988)
- Stefan Moulvad (born 1968) - guitar (joined in 2003)

Present line-up

- Michael Illo Rasmussen
- Allan Vegenfeldt
- Stefan Moulvad

Timeline

== Discography ==
| Album and details | Peak positions | Certification |
| Album and details | DEN | Certification |
|---|---|---|
| The Sandmen: Year released 1987; Record label: Garden Records | – | |
| Western Blood: Year released 1988 (Denmark); Record label: Garden Records; Year rereleased 1989 (United States version); Record label: A&M | – | |
| Gimme Gimme: Year released 1990; Record label: Garden Records | – | |
| Sleepyhead: Year released 1992; Record label: EMI | – | |
| In The House of Secrets: Year released 1994; Record label: EMI | – | |
| White Trash Red Front: Year released 2006; Record label: EMI | 9 | |
| Shine: Year released 2008; Record label: EMI | 15 | |
| Den bedste dag: Year released 2014; Record label: Universal Music | 13 | |
| Himmelstormer: Year released 2019; Record label: 500% Records | | |

Live albums

| Album and details | Peak positions | Certification |
| Album and details | DEN | Certification |
|---|---|---|
| Live: Year released 1993; Record label: EMI | – | |
| Live in Copenhagen: Year released 2012; Record label: The Sandmen / NMS 2012 | – | style |

Compilation albums

| Album and details | Peak positions | Certification |
| Album and details | DEN | Certification |
|---|---|---|
| Beauties and Beasts: Year released 2003; Content: Best of plus rareties; Record label: EMI | 36 | |
