= Forward in Reverse =

Studio album by Dizzy Mizz Lizzy
- Released: 13 April 2016 (Japan); 29 April 2016 (world)
- Recorded: December 2014 – January 2016
- Studio: Hansen Studios (Ribe, Denmark); SortHus (Copenhagen, Denmark); Medley Studios (Copenhagen, Denmark)
- Genre: Rock
- Length: 51:04
- Label: Columbia / Sony Music
- Producer: Jacob Hansen; Tim Christensen; Nick Foss

Dizzy Mizz Lizzy chronology
Live in Concert 2010 (2010)	Forward in Reverse (2016)	Livegasm! (2017)

Singles from Forward in Reverse
- 1. "I Would If I Could but I Can't" Released: 5 January 2015; 2. "Made to Believe" Released: 10 April 2015; 3. "Brainless" Released: 1 April 2016

Forward in Reverse is the third studio album by the Danish rock band Dizzy Mizz Lizzy, released on 13 April 2016 in Japan and on 29 April 2016 worldwide by Columbia Records. It is the band's first studio album with new material in 20 years.

== Background ==
A year after the release of their second studio album Rotator from 1996, Dizzy Mizz Lizzy disbanded. They reunited in 2009–2010 in which they went on an extensive tour and released remasters and live albums. On October 20, 2014, Tim Christensen wrote the abbreviation "DML2015" on his Facebook wall, indicating a second reunion. Two days later, they revealed that they had written new songs, though at that time said that it was not yet known if the band would release an LP, an EP, or just one or two singles, as that would depend on how the mood and creativity are. However, they later revealed that they had worked on the album for several years in secret.

== Theme ==
Singer and songwriter Tim Christensen explained that whereas the band's earlier material was more inspired by grunge, for the new material he was rather inspired by more violent music such as Slayer and Megadeth. Thematically, the songs are also more angry and revolve around Christensen's criticism of our contemporary time. The songs among others deal with how the Internet is both a gift and a curse, increasingly invading our private spheres and Facebook swallowing us, and what the future for the next generation will be like.

== Recording and songs ==
The album was recorded, mixed, and mastered by Jacob Hansen at his studios in Ribe, Denmark over a timespan ranging from December 2014 until January 2016. Additional recordings were made at SortHus and Medley Studios in Copenhagen.

"I Would If I Could but I Can't", was the first single that Dizzy Mizz Lizzy released in 19 years, which aired on the Danish radio station DR P3 on 5 January 2015. The second single, "Made to Believe", was released on 10 April 2015 in honor of their tour start. In anticipation of the album, "Brainless" was released as the third single on 1 April 2016.

The album sports three instrumental tracks: "Phlying Pharaoh", "Frey", and "Mindgasm". "Frey" is named after the nephew of Christensen's girlfriend, a 3-year-old whom Tim frequently takes care of.

== Cover art ==
The cover art contains an anaglyph 3D rendering of the band's mascot, a photograph from circa 1920 of Vera, the older sister of lead singer Tim Christensen's grandmother on his mother's side who died around the age of 12–14 of tuberculosis. The album cover depicts the mascot against a black background while the singles depict portions of the mascot (such as the mouth or an eye) against a white background.

== Track listing ==
All tracks are written by Tim Christensen; except "Fly Above the Radar" composed by Christensen and Martin Nielsen.

No.	Title	Length
1.	"Phlying Pharaoh"	2:15
2.	"Forward in Reverse"	4:42
3.	"Terrified in Paradise"	3:49
4.	"Brainless"	4:23
5.	"Something so Familiar"	4:54
6.	"Love at Second Sight"	4:18
7.	"Made to Believe"	4:48
8.	"Frey"	2:18
9.	"Mindgasm"	3:54
10.	"Fly Above the Radar"	4:07
11.	"I Would If I Could but I Can't"	4:10
12.	"Say It to Me Anyway"	7:30
Total length:		51:04

Japanese CD bonus tracks
No.	Title	Length
13.	"I Would If I Could but I Can't (live)"
14.	"Made to Believe (live)"
15.	"Waterline (live)"

Japanese deluxe edition DVD: Live at Loud Park 2015
No.	Title	Length
1.	"Mindgasm"
2.	"Waterline"
3.	"Barbedwired Baby's Dream"
4.	"Find My Way"
5.	"Rotator"
6.	"I Would If I Could but I Can't"
7.	"Made to Believe"
8.	"Silverflame"
9.	"Thorn in my Pride"
10.	"67 Seas in Your Eyes"
11.	"Glory"

== Personnel ==
Dizzy Mizz Lizzy

- Tim Christensen – guitars, vocals, songwriter, co-producer, Mellotron
- Martin Nielsen – bass
- Søren Friis – drums

Additional musicians

- Rune Olesen – additional percussion

Production

- Jacob Hansen – producer, recording engineer, mix engineer
- Nick Foss – co-producer
- Marcus Winther-John – lyrics consultancy
- Rune Nissen-Petersen – additional recording
- Søren Mikkelsen – additional recording (on track 7)
- Svante Forsbäck – mastering (at Chartmakers Audio Mastering, Helsinki)
- Paul Wilson – cover art, art director
- Søren Solkær – photography
- Michael Boe Laigaard – live photography
- Martin Pagaard Wolff – drum technician (at Hansen Studios)
- Vagn Olsen – drum technician (at Hansen Studios)

== Charts ==
Chart (2016)	Peak position
Danish Albums (Hitlisten)	1
Japanese Albums (Oricon)	16
