= Stefan Forrest =

Danish musician and producer

- Also known as: Don Stefano
- Born: Stefan Forrest; 10 June 1989 (age 37); Denmark
- Occupations: Record producer; singer; songwriter

Stefan Forrest (born 10 June 1989), known professionally as Don Stefano, is a Danish-born producer, singer and songwriter, who currently lives and works in Los Angeles, California, and is signed with Warner Chappell Music. He was one-half of the production duo Future Animals along with Morten Ristorp, until he began using the name as his solo moniker after Ristorp departed the group.

== Career ==
Stefan Forrest is best known for his production and songwriting contributions to the Danish band Lukas Graham, as well as Danish artists Oliver Kesi and Patrick Dorgan. Forrest is also noted for singing the hook on Kesi's "Dumme Penge" as well the multi-platinum selling hit, "Søvnløs".

As one-half of the production duo, Future Animals, Forrest's first notoriety came about through his songwriting and production for Lukas Graham. Lukas Graham's self-titled debut album topped the Danish charts for 15 weeks and, as of December 2015, has remained in the Danish Top 40 for more than 100 weeks. Lukas Graham's sophomore release, their self-titled international album (alternatively known as the Blue Album), was released in Denmark on 16 June 2015, debuting at number one for 15 consecutive weeks, and has since yielded four number-one singles, including "7 Years".

Future Animals produced Lukas Graham's 2016 United States debut album, which was released on 1 April 2016. "7 Years" had topped the iTunes USA Top 100 Most Downloaded Singles Chart and had spent three consecutive weeks at number two on Billboard's Hot 100 singles chart. Forrest has also produced songs for Selena Gomez, Julia Michaels, and Hailee Steinfeld. In 2019, he released the album Last Summer through his Future Animals moniker. Forrest is also the founder of the record company Rocket Science, through which he has released original music.

== Personal life ==
Forrest is co-owner of the burger restaurant chain Sliders, located in the Copenhagen districts of Nørrebro and Vesterbro.

== Discography ==
Year	Artist	Album	Song	Role
2012	Lukas Graham	Lukas Graham	"Ordinary Things"	Songwriter
2012	Lukas Graham	Lukas Graham	"Nice Guy"	Songwriter
2012	Lukas Graham	Lukas Graham	"Drunk in the Morning"	Songwriter
2012	Lukas Graham	Lukas Graham	"When You're With Me"	Songwriter
2012	Lukas Graham	Lukas Graham	"Apologize"	Songwriter
2012	Lukas Graham	Lukas Graham	"Criminal Mind"	Songwriter
2012	Lukas Graham	Lukas Graham	"Don't Hurt Me This Way"	Songwriter
2012	Lukas Graham	Lukas Graham	"Moving Alone"	Songwriter
2012	Lukas Graham	Lukas Graham	"Oohhh (Interlude)"	Songwriter
2012	Lukas Graham	Lukas Graham	"Never Let Me Down"	Songwriter
2012	Lukas Graham	Lukas Graham	"Better Than Yourself (Criminal Mind Pt 2)"	Songwriter
2015	Lukas Graham	Lukas Graham (Blue Album)	"7 Years"	Songwriter (Future Animals)
2015	Lukas Graham	Lukas Graham (Blue Album)	"Take the World by Storm"	Songwriter (Future Animals)
2015	Lukas Graham	Lukas Graham (Blue Album)	"Mama Said"	Songwriter (Future Animals)
2015	Lukas Graham	Lukas Graham (Blue Album)	"Happy Home"	Songwriter (Future Animals)
2015	Lukas Graham	Lukas Graham (Blue Album)	"Hayo"	Songwriter (Future Animals)
2015	Lukas Graham	Lukas Graham (Blue Album)	"When I Woke Up... (Interlude)"	Songwriter
2015	Lukas Graham	Lukas Graham (Blue Album)	"Don't You Worry 'Bout Me"	Songwriter (Future Animals)
2015	Lukas Graham	Lukas Graham (Blue Album)	"What Happened to Perfect"	Songwriter (Future Animals)
2015	Lukas Graham	Lukas Graham (Blue Album)	"Strip No More"	Songwriter (Future Animals)
2015	Lukas Graham	Lukas Graham (Blue Album)	"You're Not There"	Songwriter (Future Animals)
2015	Lukas Graham	Lukas Graham (Blue Album)	"Funeral"	Songwriter (Future Animals)
2015	Patrick Dorgan	Painkillers	"Painkillers"	Songwriter (Future Animals)
2015	Patrick Dorgan	Painkillers	"On The Way Down"	Songwriter (Future Animals)
2015	Patrick Dorgan	Painkillers	"Amazing"	Songwriter (Future Animals)
2015	Patrick Dorgan	Painkillers	"Bitter"	Songwriter (Future Animals)
2015	Patrick Dorgan	Painkillers	"Lullaby"	Songwriter (Future Animals)
2015	Patrick Dorgan	Painkillers	"Marilyn"	Songwriter (Future Animals)
2015	Suspekt	De Bedste Til Smatten	"Hun Er På Mig"	Songwriter
2015	TopGunn	Ingen Andre	"Veninder"	Songwriter
2015	Kesi	Barn Af Byen	"Søvnløs"	Songwriter
2015	Kesi	Barn Af Byen	"Dumme Penge"	Songwriter/Singer
2016	Scarlet Pleasure	Youth Is Wasted on the Young	"Wanna Know"	Songwriter
2017	Future Animals	Ask For It	"Ask For It"	Songwriter/Singer
2017	Kidd	Bedre	"Bedre"	Songwriter/Singer
2017	Lukas Graham	My Little Pony: The Movie	"Off to See the World"	Songwriter
2018	Lukas Graham	3 (The Purple Album)	"Love Someone"	Songwriter
2018	Lukas Graham	3 (The Purple Album)	"Lullaby"	Songwriter
2018	Lukas Graham	3 (The Purple Album)	"You're Not the Only One (Redemption Song)"	Songwriter
2018	Lukas Graham	3 (The Purple Album)	"Not a Damn Thing Changed"	Songwriter
2018	Lukas Graham	3 (The Purple Album)	"Promise"	Songwriter
2018	Lukas Graham	3 (The Purple Album)	"Unhappy"	Songwriter
2018	Future Animals	Single	"Crazy Love"	Songwriter/Singer
2019	Kesi	Single	"Vågn Op"	Songwriter/Singer
2019	Lukas Graham	4 (The Pink Album)	"Lie"	Songwriter

== Awards and nominations ==
Year	Award	Category	Nominee	Result
2012	Danish Music Awards	New Danish Name of the Year	Lukas Graham	Won
2012	Danish Music Awards	Audience Prize of the Year	Lukas Graham	Nominated
2012	Danish Music Awards	Band of the Year	Lukas Graham	Nominated
2012	Danish Music Awards	Male Artist of the Year	Lukas Graham	Nominated
2012	Danish Music Awards	Newcomer of the Year	Lukas Graham	Nominated
2012	Danish Music Awards	Songwriter of the Year	Lukas Graham	Nominated
2012	Danish Music Awards	Best Pop Album	Lukas Graham	Nominated
2013	Carl Prisen	Talent of the Year	Lukas Graham	Won
2015	MTV Europe Music Awards	Best Danish Act	Lukas Graham	Won
2015	MTV Europe Music Awards	Best European Act	Lukas Graham	Nominated
2016	MTV Video Music Awards	Best New Artist	Lukas Graham	Nominated
2016	MTV Europe Music Awards	Best New Act	Lukas Graham	Nominated
2016	MTV Europe Music Awards	Best Push Act	Lukas Graham	Nominated
2016	MTV Europe Music Awards	Best Danish Act	Lukas Graham	Nominated
2016	MTV Europe Music Awards	Best Song	"7 Years"	Nominated
2016	BBC Music Awards	Song of the Year	"7 Years"	Nominated
2016	LOS40 Music Awards	International New Artist of the Year	Themselves	Nominated
2016	Teen Choice Awards	Choice Summer Song	"7 Years"	Nominated
2016	Carl Prisen	Composer of the Year – Pop	Lukas Graham	Won
2016	Carl Prisen	Song of the Year	"7 Years"	Won
2017	Grammy Awards	Record of the Year	"7 Years"	Nominated
2017	Grammy Awards	Song of the Year	"7 Years"	Nominated
2017	Grammy Awards	Best Pop Duo/Group Performance	"7 Years"	Nominated
2017	iHeartRadio Music Awards	Best Lyrics	"7 Years"	Nominated
2017	iHeartRadio Music Awards	Best New Pop Artist	Lukas Graham	Nominated
2017	Kids' Choice Awards	Best New Artist	Lukas Graham	Nominated
2017	Billboard Music Awards	Top New Artist	Lukas Graham	Nominated
2017	ASCAP Pop Awards	Winning Song	"7 Years"	Won
2020	BMI Pop Awards	Winning Song	"Love Someone"	Won

== Certifications ==
=== Studio albums ===
List of albums, with selected chart positions
Title	Details	Peak chart positions										Certifications
Title	Details	DEN	AUS	AUT	GER	NOR	NZ	SWE	SWI	UK	US	Certifications
Lukas Graham	Released: 26 March 2012; Label: Copenhagen; Formats: Digital download, CD	1	—	—	41	—	—	—	—	—	—	DEN: 7× Platinum
Lukas Graham (Blue Album)	Released: 17 June 2015; Label: Copenhagen, Warner; Formats: Digital download, CD	1	1	31	28	15	2	3	34	2	3	DEN: 17× Platinum; GLF: Platinum; MC: Platinum; BPI: Gold; RIAA: Platinum
3 (The Purple Album)	Released: 26 October 2018; Label: Warner; Formats: Digital download, CD	1	— (Note: 3 (The Purple Album) did not enter the ARIA Albums Chart, but peaked at number 31 on the ARIA Digital Albums Chart.)	—	57	2	—	3	85	—	89	DEN: 4× Platinum; GLF: Gold
4 (The Pink Album)	Released: 20 January 2023; Label: Warner; Formats: Digital download, CD, LP	1	—	—	56	—	—	—	—	—	—	IFPI DEN: Platinum
"—" denotes an album that did not chart or was not released in that territory.

=== Singles ===
Title	Year	Peak chart positions										Certifications	Album
Title	Year	DEN	AUS	AUT	GER	NL	NOR	NZ	SWE	UK	US	Certifications	Album
"Ordinary Things"	2011	2	—	—	—	—	—	—	—	—	—	DEN: 3× Platinum	Lukas Graham
"Drunk in the Morning"	2012	1	–	42	30	–	–	–	–	127	—	DEN: 4× Platinum	Lukas Graham
"Criminal Mind"	2012	4	—	—	—	—	—	—	—	—	—	DEN: 2× Platinum	Lukas Graham
"Better Than Yourself (Criminal Mind Pt 2)"	2012	1	—	—	—	—	—	—	—	—	—	DEN: 3× Platinum	Lukas Graham
"Mama Said"	2014	1	42	–	–	–	3	29	13	48	36	DEN: 4× Platinum; GLF: 3× Platinum; BPI: Gold; RIAA: 2× Platinum; MC: Platinum; RMNZ: Gold	Lukas Graham (Blue Album)
"Strip No More"	2015	1	—	—	—	—	—	—	—	—	—	DEN: 3× Platinum	Lukas Graham (Blue Album)
"7 Years"	2015	1	1	1	6	1	4	1	1	1	2	DEN: 8× Platinum; ARIA: 6× Platinum; BPI: 6× Platinum; GLF: 3× Platinum; MC: Diamond; RIAA: 12× Platinum; RMNZ: 3× Platinum; AUT: Gold	Lukas Graham (Blue Album)
"You're Not There"	2016	25	—	—	—	—	—	—	—	—	— (Note: "You're Not There" did not enter the US Billboard Hot 100, but peaked at number 25 on the Bubbling Under Hot 100 Singles chart.)	DEN: 2× Platinum	Lukas Graham (Blue Album)
"Take the World by Storm"	2016	10	—	—	—	—	—	—	—	—	—	DEN: 2× Platinum	Lukas Graham (Blue Album)
"Off to See the World"	2017	9	—	—	—	—	—	—	—	—	—	IFPI DEN: Platinum	My Little Pony: The Movie
"Love Someone"	2018	1	20	29	33	62	5	27	8	—	70	IFPI DEN: 5× Platinum; RIAA: 2× Platinum; ARIA: 3× Platinum; BPI: Gold; RMNZ: Gold	3 (The Purple Album)
"Not a Damn Thing Changed"	2018	2	—	—	—	—	—	—	— (Note: "Not a Damn Thing Changed" did not enter the Swedish Singellista Chart, but peaked at number 16 on the Swedish Heatseeker Chart.)	—	—	DEN: Platinum	3 (The Purple Album)
"Lie"	2019	2	—	—	—	—	—	— (Note: "Lie" did not enter the NZ Top 40 Singles Chart, but peaked at number 22 on the NZ Hot Singles Chart.)	— (Note: "Lie" did not enter the Swedish Singellista Chart, but peaked at number eight on the Swedish Heatseeker Chart.)	—	—	DEN: 2× Platinum	4 (The Pink Album)
"—" denotes an album that did not chart or was not released in that territory.
