= You're Not There =

Single by Lukas Graham

from the album Lukas Graham (Blue Album)
- Released: 13 May 2016
- Genre: Pop
- Length: 3:21
- Label: Copenhagen; Warner Bros.
- Songwriters: Lukas Forchhammer; Morten Ristorp; Stefan Forrest; Morten Pilegaard; James Alan
- Producers: Future Animals; Pilo

Lukas Graham singles chronology
"Golden" (2016)	"You're Not There" (2016)	"Take the World by Storm" (2016)

"You're Not There" is a song by Danish soul-pop band Lukas Graham, released by Copenhagen Records on 13 May 2016 in Scandinavia, Germany, Austria, and Switzerland, as the fourth single from their second studio album, Lukas Graham (Blue Album) (2015).

The song is about frontman Lukas Forchhammer's father, Eugene Graham, who died in 2012.

== Track listing ==
Digital download
No.	Title	Length
1.	"You're Not There"	3:21

Digital download — remix
No.	Title	Length
1.	"You're Not There" (Grey remix)	3:18

== Live performances ==
The song was performed during the 2016 MTV Europe Music Awards in a medley featuring the group's biggest hit "7 Years". On November 9, 2016 they performed the song on the American talk show Late Night with Seth Meyers.

== Chart performance ==
=== Weekly charts ===
Chart (2015–17)	Peak position
Belgium (Ultratip Bubbling Under Flanders)	6
Belgium (Ultratip Bubbling Under Wallonia)	2
Canada CHR/Top 40 (Billboard)	43
Canada Hot AC (Billboard)	31
Denmark (Tracklisten)	25
Hungary (Rádiós Top 40)	29
Scottish Singles Sales (Official Charts)	58
Spain (Promusicae)	48
US Bubbling Under Hot 100 (Billboard)	25
US Adult Pop Airplay (Billboard)	20
US Pop Airplay (Billboard)	25

=== Year-end charts ===
Chart (2016)	Position
Denmark (Tracklisten)	84

== Certifications ==
Region	Certification	Certified units/sales
Denmark (IFPI Danmark)	3× Platinum	270,000^{‡}
^{‡} Sales+streaming figures based on certification alone.

== Release history ==
Region	Date	Format	Label
Finland	18 September 2015	Digital download — promotional single	Copenhagen
Norway	18 September 2015	Digital download — promotional single	Copenhagen
Sweden	18 September 2015	Digital download — promotional single	Copenhagen
Austria	13 May 2016	Digital download	Copenhagen
Denmark	13 May 2016	Digital download	Copenhagen
Germany	13 May 2016	Digital download	Copenhagen
Switzerland	13 May 2016	Digital download	Copenhagen
United States	8 November 2016	Mainstream radio airplay	Warner Bros.
United States	15 February 2017	Digital download — remix	Warner Bros.
Denmark	24 February 2017	Digital download — remix	Copenhagen
