= Take the World by Storm (song) =

"Take the World By Storm"

Single by Lukas Graham

from the album Lukas Graham (Blue Album)
- Released: 16 September 2016
- Genre: Pop
- Length: 3:11
- Label: Copenhagen; Warner Bros.
- Songwriters: Lukas Forchhammer; Morten Ristorp; Stefan Forrest; Morten Pilegaard; Ross Golan
- Producers: Future Animals; Pilo

Lukas Graham singles chronology
"You're Not There" (2016)	"Take the World By Storm" (2016)	"Off to See the World" (2017)

"Take the World by Storm" is a song by Danish soul-pop band Lukas Graham from their second studio album, Lukas Graham (Blue Album). The song was released as a digital download on 16 September 2016 by Copenhagen Records, and served as the album's fifth single in Scandinavia.

== Charts ==
Chart (2015)	Peak position
Denmark (Tracklisten)	10

== Certifications ==
Region	Certification	Certified units/sales
Denmark (IFPI Danmark)	2× Platinum	180,000^{‡}
^{‡} Sales+streaming figures based on certification alone.

== Release history ==
Region	Date	Format	Label
Denmark	16 September 2016	Digital download	Copenhagen; Warner Bros.
Finland	16 September 2016	Digital download	Copenhagen; Warner Bros.
Norway	16 September 2016	Digital download	Copenhagen; Warner Bros.
Sweden	16 September 2016	Digital download	Copenhagen; Warner Bros.
