= Fifty Shades Freed (soundtrack) =

Fifty Shades Freed (Original Motion Picture Soundtrack)

Soundtrack album by various artists
- Released: February 9, 2018
- Recorded: 2017
- Genres: Electro-R&B; alternative R&B; pop; electropop
- Length: 73:16
- Label: Republic
- Producers: Black Atlass; Nasri Atweh; BloodPop; DJ Camper; Rob Cohen; Danny Elfman; Julian Gramma; John Hill; Hybrid; Oliver Kraus; Spencer Lee; Louis the Child; Ryan Marrone; Mattman & Robin; Max Martin; Adam Messinger; Miike Snow; Oligee; Ali Payami; Jordan Palmer; Joe Pringle; Benjamin Rice; Rissi; Shungudzo; Freddy Wexler; Whethan

Singles from Fifty Shades Freed (Original Motion Picture Soundtrack)
- 1. "For You" Released: January 5, 2018; 2. "Capital Letters" Released: January 12, 2018; 3. "Heaven" Released: January 26, 2018

Fifty Shades Freed (Original Motion Picture Soundtrack) is the soundtrack accompanying the 2018 film Fifty Shades Freed. Released on February 9, 2018 alongside the film, it features 19 tracks with three additional songs. The album was led by three singles: "For You", "Capital Letters" and "Heaven", released on January 5, 12 and 26, respectively. Two of the film's score cues composed by Danny Elfman were also included in the standard edition of the album. Jamie Dornan also performed a cover of Paul McCartney's 1970 song "Maybe I'm Amazed", that was released as a bonus track from the album.

== Singles ==
The album's first single "For You", a duet performed by Liam Payne and Rita Ora was released on January 5, 2018, and its music video was unveiled three weeks later. The second single "Capital Letters" performed by Hailee Steinfeld and BloodPop was released on January 12. The third single "Heaven", performed by Julia Michaels was released on January 26.

== Critical reception ==
Jon Pareles of The New York Times wrote "throughout the album, despite skillful songs from Ms. Michaels and Sia, there's a sense of obligations being met, bases being touched. It's the bane of most sequels, and the songs in Fifty Shades Freed can't escape it." The first three singles from the album were selected as one of the best songs from the film's franchise, according to Billboard critic Nina Braca.

== Commercial performance ==
Unlike its predecessors, the soundtrack to Freed was moderately successful; it sold nearly 58,000 units in its debut week where it was charted at number 5 on Billboard 200. The music video for the single "For You", albeit being charted at number 46 on the Billboard Hot 100, had garnered around 50 million views in YouTube within a month.

== Track listing ==
Fifty Shades Freed (Original Motion Picture Soundtrack) standard edition track listing
No.	Title	Writer(s)	Producer(s)	Length
1.	"Capital Letters" (performed by Hailee Steinfeld and BloodPop)	Michael Tucker; Rachel Keen; Hailee Steinfeld; Andrew Jackson; Ellie Goulding; Ely Weisfield	BloodPop; Benjamin Rice	3:39
2.	"For You" (performed by Liam Payne and Rita Ora)	Andrew Watt; Ali Payami; Ali Tamposi	Ali Payami; Watt^{[v]}; Peter Carlsson^{[v]}	4:05
3.	"Sacrifice" (performed by Black Atlass featuring Jessie Reyez)	Alex Fleming; Jessie Reyez; Oliver Goldstein; Marcel Everett; Billy Walsh; Jason Quenneville	Black Atlass; Oligee; XXYYXX^{[c]}	3:29
4.	"High" (performed by Whethan and Dua Lipa)	Ethan Snoreck; Dua Lipa; John Hill; Sarah Aarons	Whethan; Hill; Rob Cohen	3:16
5.	"Heaven" (performed by Julia Michaels)	Julia Michaels; Brian Garcia; Uzoechi Emenike; Morten Ristorp; Tayla Parx	Rissi	3:11
6.	"Big Spender" (performed by Kiana Ledé featuring Prince Charlez)	Kiana Ledé; Jared Cotter; Jeremy Skaller; Charles Hinshaw Jr.; Julian Gramma; Geoffrey Early; Adam Daniel; Andrew Bazzi	Gramma; Early^{[c]}; JRemy^{[a]}; Rice N Peas^{[a]}	3:15
7.	"Never Tear Us Apart" (performed by Bishop Briggs)	Andrew Farriss; Michael Hutchence	Hybrid; Mark Jackson^{[c]}; Ian Scott^{[c]}	3:14
8.	"The Wolf" (performed by the Spencer Lee Band)	Spencer Lee; Freddy Wexler; Eric Valentine	Lee; Joe Pringle; Wexler; Valentine^{[c]}	2:54
9.	"Are You" (performed by Julia Michaels)	Michaels; Mattias Larsson; Robin Fredriksson; Justin Tranter	Mattman & Robin	3:31
10.	"Cross Your Mind" (performed by Sabrina Claudio)	Sabrina Claudio; Adam Messinger; Nasri Atweh; Hayley Penner	Atweh; Messinger	3:38
11.	"Change Your Mind" (performed by Miike Snow)	Andrew Wyatt; Pontus Winnberg; Christian Karlsson	Miike Snow	3:28
12.	"Come On Back" (performed by Shungudzo)	Alexandra Govere; Jordan Palmer; Jennifer Owen Youngs	Shungudzo; Palmer	3:16
13.	"I Got You (I Feel Good)" (performed by Jessie J)	James Brown	DJ Camper	3:16
14.	"(Te Meilleure Ennemie) Pearls" (performed by Samantha Gongol featuring Juliette Armanet)	Samantha Gongol; Ryan Marrone; Juliette Armanet	Marrone	3:29
15.	"Deer In Headlights" (performed by Sia)	Sia Furler; Samuel Dixon	Oliver Kraus	4:25
16.	"Diddy Bop" (performed by Jacob Banks and Louis the Child)	Jacob Banks; Frederic Kennett; Robby Hauldren	Louis the Child	3:39
17.	"Love Me Like You Do" (performed by Ellie Goulding)	Tove Lo; Payami; Ilya Salmanzadeh; Savan Kotecha; Max Martin	Martin; Payami	4:13
18.	"Freed" (performed by Danny Elfman)	Danny Elfman	Elfman	2:12
19.	"Seeing Red" (performed by Danny Elfman)	Elfman	Elfman	2:42
Total length:				64:52

Fifty Shades Freed (Original Motion Picture Soundtrack) bonus tracks
No.	Title	Writer(s)	Producer(s)	Length
20.	"Maybe I'm Amazed" (performed by Jamie Dornan)	Paul McCartney	Harvey Mason Jr.	1:17
21.	"Cross Your Mind" (Spanish version) (performed by Sabrina Claudio)	Claudio; Messinger; Atweh; Penner; Luis Figueroa Riog	Atweh; Messinger	3:38
22.	"Pearls" (performed by Samantha Gongol)	Gongol; Marrone	Marrone	3:29
Total length:				73:16

=== Notes ===
- ^{^[c]} indicates a co-producer
- ^{^[a]} indicates an additional producer
- ^{^[v]} indicates a vocal producer

== Charts ==
=== Weekly charts ===
Weekly chart performance for Fifty Shades Freed (Original Motion Picture Soundtrack)
Chart (2018)	Peak position
Australian Albums (ARIA)	4
Austrian Albums (Ö3 Austria)	1
Belgian Albums (Ultratop Flanders)	5
Belgian Albums (Ultratop Wallonia)	12
Canadian Albums (Billboard)	5
Croatian International Albums (HDU)	16
Danish Albums (Hitlisten)	2
Dutch Albums (Album Top 100)	13
Finnish Albums (Suomen virallinen lista)	5
French Albums (SNEP)	5
German Albums (Offizielle Top 100)	1
New Zealand Albums (RMNZ)	9
Norwegian Albums (VG-lista)	1
Swiss Albums (Schweizer Hitparade)	4
Spanish Albums (Promusicae)	14
UK Compilation Albums (Official Charts)	14
US Billboard 200	5
US Soundtrack Albums (Billboard)	1

=== Year-end charts ===
Year-end chart performance for Fifty Shades Freed (Original Motion Picture Soundtrack)
Chart (2015)	Position
Australian Albums (ARIA)	41
Austrian Albums (Ö3 Austria)	49
Belgian Albums (Ultratop Flanders)	74
Belgian Albums (Ultratop Wallonia)	165
Danish Albums (Hitlisten)	23
German Albums (Offizielle Top 100)	52
US Billboard 200	184
US Soundtrack Albums (Billboard)	17
