= Lukas Graham (disambiguation) =

Lukas Graham are a Danish pop band, formed in 2011.

Lukas Graham may also refer to:

- Lukas Graham (2012 album), their eponymous debut album
- Lukas Graham (2015 album), their eponymous second album, alternatively known as Blue Album
