= Mama Said (Lukas Graham song) =

Single by Lukas Graham

from the album Lukas Graham
- Released: 23 June 2014
- Recorded: 2012
- Genre: Pop; soul
- Length: 3:26 (album version); 3:00 (radio edit)
- Label: Copenhagen (original); Warner Bros. (worldwide)
- Songwriters: Lukas Forchhammer; Morten Ristorp; Stefan Forrest; Morten Pilegaard
- Producers: Future Animals; Pilo

Lukas Graham singles chronology
"Happy Home" (2014)	"Mama Said" (2014)	"Søndagsbarn" (2015)

"Mama Said" is a single by Danish band Lukas Graham. The song was released as a digital download on 23 June 2014 through Copenhagen Records. It achieved success in Denmark, Norway, Finland and Sweden. The song was written by Lukas Forchhammer, Morten Ristorp, Stefan Forrest, and Morten "Pilo" Pilegaard, and it was produced by Forrest and Ristorp under their stage name Future Animals, and Pilegaard. It interpolates the song "It's the Hard Knock Life" from the musical Annie.

== Charts ==
=== Weekly charts ===
Chart (2014–2017)	Peak position
Australia (ARIA)	42
Belgium (Ultratop 50 Flanders)	22
Belgium (Ultratop 50 Wallonia)	44
Canada Hot 100 (Billboard)	48
Canada CHR/Top 40 (Billboard)	36
Canada Hot AC (Billboard)	26
Czech Republic Airplay (ČNS IFPI)	96
Czech Republic Singles Digital (ČNS IFPI)	44
Denmark (Tracklisten)	1
Hungary (Rádiós Top 40)	14
Hungary (Single Top 40)	38
Ireland (IRMA)	72
Italy (FIMI)	37
New Zealand (Recorded Music NZ)	29
Norway (VG-lista)	3
Poland Airplay (ZPAV)	5
Portugal (AFP)	58
Scottish Singles Sales (Official Charts)	20
Slovakia Airplay (ČNS IFPI)	64
Slovakia Singles Digital (ČNS IFPI)	56
Spain (Promusicae)	56
Sweden (Sverigetopplistan)	13
UK Singles (Official Charts)	48
US Billboard Hot 100	36
US Adult Pop Airplay (Billboard)	12
US Pop Airplay (Billboard)	20

=== Year-end charts ===
Chart (2014)	Position
Denmark (Tracklisten)	12
Chart (2015)	Position
Denmark (Tracklisten)	75
Chart (2016)	Position
Belgium (Ultratop Flanders)	83
Hungary (Rádiós Top 40)	82
Sweden (Sverigetopplistan)	74
US Adult Top 40 (Billboard)	50
Chart (2017)	Position
Hungary (Rádiós Top 40)	59

== Certifications ==
Region	Certification	Certified units/sales
Canada (Music Canada)	Platinum	80,000^{‡}
Denmark (IFPI Danmark)	4× Platinum	360,000^{‡}
Italy (FIMI)	Platinum	50,000^{‡}
New Zealand (RMNZ)	Platinum	30,000^{‡}
Poland (ZPAV)	Gold	10,000^{‡}
Spain (Promusicae)	Gold	20,000^{‡}
Sweden (GLF)	3× Platinum	120,000^{‡}
United Kingdom (BPI)	Gold	400,000^{‡}
United States (RIAA)	2× Platinum	2,000,000^{‡}
^{‡} Sales+streaming figures based on certification alone.

== Release history ==
Region	Date	Format	Label
Denmark	23 June 2014	Digital download	Copenhagen
Austria	22 May 2015	Digital download	Island
Germany	22 May 2015	Digital download	Island
Switzerland	22 May 2015	Digital download	Island
United States	22 October 2015	Digital download	Warner Bros.
United States	28 June 2016	Mainstream radio airplay	Warner Bros.
