= Morten Ristorp =

Danish producer, composer, songwriter and musician (born 1986)

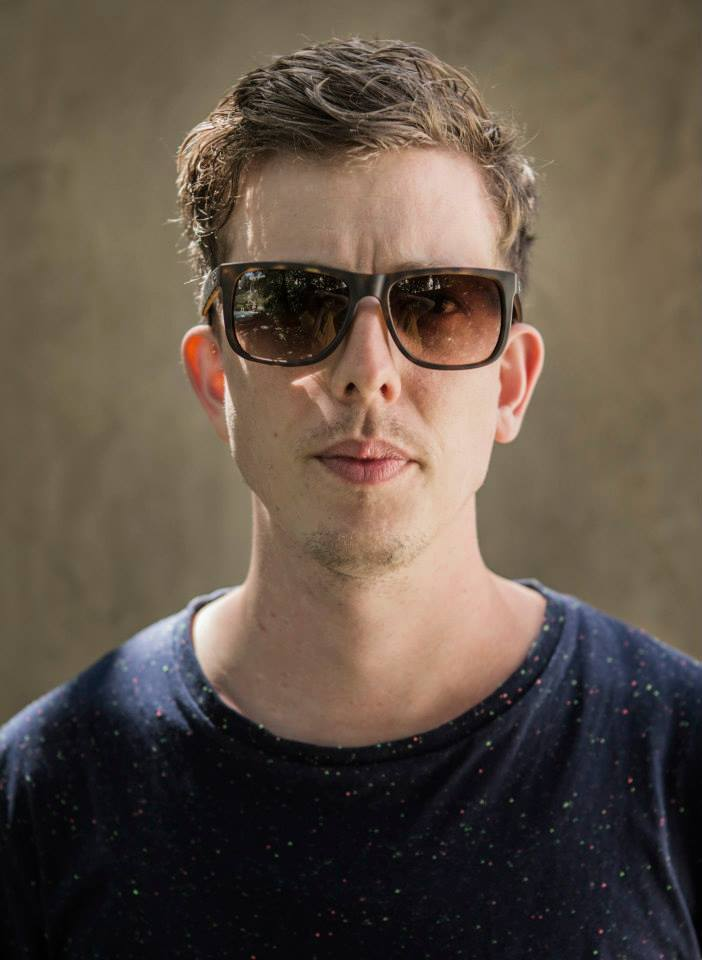
- Ristorp in 2014

Background information
- Also known as: Rissi
- Born: Morten Ristorp Jensen; 3 April 1986 (age 40); Copenhagen, Denmark
- Occupations: Musician; record producer; songwriter; composer

Morten Ristorp Jensen (born 3 April 1986), known professionally as Rissi, is a Danish producer, composer, songwriter and musician. Ristorp is, along with Stefan Forrest, co-founder, as well as a previous member, of Future Animals.

== Personal life ==
Morten Ristorp Jensen was born on 3 April 1986 at Rigshospitalet, in Copenhagen, Denmark. He grew up in the town of Tårnby on the island of Amager with his parents and two older siblings. He attended elementary school at Løjtegårdsskolen and graduated in 2002 and went to Sankt Annæ Gymnasium on its special Basic Course for Musicians (Musikalsk Grundkursus – MGK). When he was not attending school, he played saxophone in The Tivoli Guard from 1997 to 2002. After graduating from Sankt Annæ Gymnasium in 2006, he was accepted into the Rhythmic Music Conservatory in Copenhagen in 2007, where he played saxophone. In 2010, he graduated from the Rhythmic Music Conservatory with a BA in music.

== Career ==
Ristorp is a songwriter, musician, and co-producer of BackBone Studio and, formerly, Future Animals. He is best known for international hits like "7 Years" by Lukas Graham. He also works with artists such as Kygo and Julia Michaels, among others.

Besides being one of Lukas Graham's executive producers, Ristorp also temporarily played keyboard for the band from 2011 to 2012 due to the previous pianist, Anders Kirk, leaving the band. Ristorp filled the role until Kasper Daugaard joined the band. When Daugaard left the band in June 2016, Ristorp took the role of keyboardist again.

Ristorp won his first Award, Carl Prisen, in 2013, as Talent of the Year, along with Lukas Graham, alongside his co-songwriters Stefan Forrest, Sebastian Fogh and Lukas Forchhammer.

Ristorp was the third most-played Danish musician in 2015. In 2018, he was a producer on Lukas Graham's album 3 (The Purple Album), including the single "Love Someone". His music has appeared in major motion pictures including 2011's The Reunion and 2018's Fifty Shades Freed, as well as television programs including The Greatest Dancer and The Voice. In 2020, he produced the song "Lose Somebody" by Kygo and OneRepublic, which reached number five on the Billboard Hot Dance/Electronic Charts.

== Discography ==
Year	Artist	Album	Song	Role
2012	Lukas Graham	Lukas Graham	"Ordinary Things"	Producer (BackBone)
2012	Lukas Graham	Lukas Graham	"Nice Guy"	Producer (BackBone), songwriter
2012	Lukas Graham	Lukas Graham	"Drunk in the Morning"	Producer (BackBone), songwriter
2012	Lukas Graham	Lukas Graham	"When You're with Me (Interlude)"	Producer (BackBone), songwriter
2012	Lukas Graham	Lukas Graham	"Apologize"	Producer (BackBone)
2012	Lukas Graham	Lukas Graham	"Criminal Mind"	Producer (BackBone), songwriter
2012	Lukas Graham	Lukas Graham	"Don't Hurt Me This Way"	Producer (BackBone), songwriter
2012	Lukas Graham	Lukas Graham	"Moving Alone"	Producer (BackBone)
2012	Lukas Graham	Lukas Graham	"Oohhh (Interlude)"	Producer (BackBone)
2012	Lukas Graham	Lukas Graham	"Never Let Me Down"	Producer (BackBone)
2012	Lukas Graham	Lukas Graham	"Before The Morning Sun"	Producer (BackBone)
2012	Lukas Graham	Lukas Graham	"Better Than Yourself (Criminal Mind Pt 2)"	Executive producer (BackBone)
2015	TopGunn	Ingen Andre	"Veninder"	Producer (Future Animals), songwriter
2015	Lukas Graham	Lukas Graham (Blue Album)	"7 Years"	Producer (Future Animals), songwriter
2015	Lukas Graham	Lukas Graham (Blue Album)	"Take the World by Storm"	Producer (Future Animals), songwriter
2015	Lukas Graham	Lukas Graham (Blue Album)	"Mama Said"	Producer (Future Animals), songwriter
2015	Lukas Graham	Lukas Graham (Blue Album)	"Happy Home"	Producer (Future Animals), songwriter
2015	Lukas Graham	Lukas Graham (Blue Album)	"Hayo"	Producer (Future Animals), songwriter
2015	Lukas Graham	Lukas Graham (Blue Album)	"When I Woke Up… (Interlude)"	Songwriter
2015	Lukas Graham	Lukas Graham (Blue Album)	"Don't You Worry 'Bout Me"	Producer (Future Animals), songwriter
2015	Lukas Graham	Lukas Graham (Blue Album)	"What Happened to Perfect"	Producer (Future Animals), songwriter
2015	Lukas Graham	Lukas Graham (Blue Album)	"Playtime"	Producer (Future Animals), songwriter
2015	Lukas Graham	Lukas Graham (Blue Album)	"Strip No More"	Producer (Future Animals), songwriter
2015	Lukas Graham	Lukas Graham (Blue Album)	"You're Not There"	Producer (Future Animals), songwriter
2015	Lukas Graham	Lukas Graham (Blue Album)	Funeral	Producer (Future Animals), songwriter
2015	Patrick Dorgan	Painkillers	"Painkillers"	Producer (Future Animals), composer
2015	Patrick Dorgan	Painkillers	"On The Way Down"	Producer (Future Animals), composer
2015	Patrick Dorgan	Painkillers	"Amazing"	Producer (Future Animals), composer
2015	Patrick Dorgan	Painkillers	"Bitter"	Producer (Future Animals)
2015	Patrick Dorgan	Painkillers	"I Would If I Could"	Producer (Future Animals)
2015	Patrick Dorgan	Painkillers	"Risky Business"	Producer (Future Animals), composer
2015	Patrick Dorgan	Painkillers	"Hollywood"	Producer (Future Animals)
2015	Patrick Dorgan	Painkillers	"Lullaby"	Producer (Future Animals), composer
2015	Patrick Dorgan	Painkillers	"Marilyn"	Producer (Future Animals), composer
2015	Patrick Dorgan	Painkillers	"Amy"	Producer (Future Animals)
2017	Future Animals	Ask For It	"Ask For It"	Producer (Future Animals), songwriter
2017	Lukas Graham	My Little Pony: The Movie	"Off to See the World"	Producer (Future Animals), songwriter
2018	Julia Michaels	Fifty Shades Freed	"Heaven"	Producer (Future Animals), songwriter
2018	Patrick Dorgan	Coming Home	"Coming Home"	Producer (Future Animals), songwriter
2018	Lukas Graham	3 (The Purple Album)	"Love Someone"	Producer/Songwriter
2018	Lukas Graham	3 (The Purple Album)	"Lullaby"	Producer/Songwriter
2018	Lukas Graham	3 (The Purple Album)	"You're Not the Only One (Redemption Song)"	Producer/Songwriter
2018	Lukas Graham	3 (The Purple Album)	"Not a Damn Thing Changed"	Producer/Songwriter
2018	Lukas Graham	3 (The Purple Album)	"Promise"	Producer/Songwriter
2018	Lukas Graham	3 (The Purple Album)	"Stick Around"	Producer/Songwriter
2018	Lukas Graham	3 (The Purple Album)	"Unhappy"	Producer/Songwriter
2018	Lukas Graham	3 (The Purple Album)	"Everything That Isn't Me"	Producer/Songwriter
2018	Lukas Graham	3 (The Purple Album)	"Hold My Hand"	Producer/Songwriter
2018	Lukas Graham	3 (The Purple Album)	"Say Yes (Church Ballad)"	Producer/Songwriter
2020	Kygo and OneRepublic	Golden Hour	"Lose Somebody"	Songwriter
2020	Little Mix	Confetti	"Sweet Melody"	Producer/Songwriter
2021	JoJo	Non-album single	"Creature of Habit"	Producer/Songwriter
2022	Beyoncé	Renaissance	"Cuff It"	Producer/Songwriter
2022	Mimi Webb	Amelia	"Ghost of You"	Songwriter
2023	Jorja Smith	The Color Purple (Music From and Inspired by the Motion Picture)	"Finally"	Songwriter
2023	Halle and Phylicia Pearl Mpasi	The Color Purple (Music From and Inspired by the Motion Picture)	Keep It Movin'	Songwriter
2024	¥$ (Kanye West & Ty Dolla Sign)	Vultures 1	"Burn"	Songwriter
2024	Benson Boone	Twisters: The Album	"Death Wish Love"	Producer/Songwriter

== Awards and nominations ==
Year	Award	Category	Nominee	Result	Ref
2012	Danish Music Awards	New Danish Name of the Year	Lukas Graham	Won	
2012	Danish Music Awards	Audience Prize of the Year	Lukas Graham	Nominated	
2012	Danish Music Awards	Band of the Year	Lukas Graham	Nominated	
2012	Danish Music Awards	Male Artist of the Year	Lukas Graham	Nominated	
2012	Danish Music Awards	Newcomer of the Year	Lukas Graham	Nominated	
2012	Danish Music Awards	Songwriter of the Year	Lukas Graham	Nominated	
2012	Danish Music Awards	Best Pop Album	Lukas Graham	Nominated	
2013	Carl Prisen	Talent of the Year	Lukas Graham	Won	
2015	MTV Europe Music Awards	Best Danish Act	Lukas Graham	Won	
2015	MTV Europe Music Awards	Best European Act	Lukas Graham	Nominated	
2016	MTV Video Music Awards	Best New Artist	Lukas Graham	Nominated	
2016	MTV Europe Music Awards	Best New Act	Lukas Graham	Nominated	
2016	MTV Europe Music Awards	Best Push Act	Lukas Graham	Nominated	
2016	MTV Europe Music Awards	Best Danish Act	Lukas Graham	Nominated	
2016	MTV Europe Music Awards	Best Song	"7 Years"	Nominated	
2016	BBC Music Awards	Song of the Year	"7 Years"	Nominated	
2016	LOS40 Music Awards	International New Artist of the Year	Themselves	Nominated	
2016	Teen Choice Awards	Choice Summer Song	"7 Years"	Nominated	
2016	Carl Prisen	Composer of the Year – Pop	Lukas Graham	Won	
2016	Carl Prisen	Song of the Year	"7 Years"	Won	
2017	Grammy Awards	Record of the Year	"7 Years"	Nominated	
2017	Grammy Awards	Song of the Year	"7 Years"	Nominated	
2017	Grammy Awards	Best Pop Duo/Group Performance	"7 Years"	Nominated	
2017	iHeartRadio Music Awards	Best Lyrics	"7 Years"	Nominated	
2017	iHeartRadio Music Awards	Best New Pop Artist	Lukas Graham	Nominated	
2017	Kids' Choice Awards	Best New Artist	Lukas Graham	Nominated	
2017	Billboard Music Awards	Top New Artist	Lukas Graham	Nominated	
2017	ASCAP Pop Awards	Winning Song	"7 Years"	Won	
2020	BMI Pop Awards	Winning Song	"Love Someone"	Won	
2022	BMI Pop Awards	Winning Song	"Lose Somebody"	Won	
2023	BMI R&B/Hip-Hop Awards	Most Performed Songs of the Year	"Cuff It"	Won	
2023	ASCAP Rhythm & Soul	Most Performed R&B/Hip-Hop & Rap Songs	"Cuff It"	Won	
2023	Grammy Awards	Best R&B Song	"Cuff It"	Won	

Ristorp was nominated at the Danish Music Awards as Danish Songwriter of the Year – Koda-Prisen in 2015 for Lukas Graham (Blue Album).
