= Criminal Mind (song) =

Single by Lukas Graham

from the album Lukas Graham
- Released: 19 March 2012
- Recorded: 2011
- Genre: Pop
- Length: 3:05
- Label: Copenhagen
- Songwriters: Lukas Forchhammer; Sebastian Fogh; Stefan Forrest; Morten Ristorp; Mark Falgren
- Producer: Backbone

Lukas Graham singles chronology
"Drunk in the Morning" (2012)	"Criminal Mind" (2012)	"Better Than Yourself (Criminal Mind Pt 2)" (2012)

"Criminal Mind" is a single by Danish band Lukas Graham. The song was released in Denmark as a digital download in March 2012. It was released as the third single from their self-titled debut studio album. The song peaked at number four on the Danish Singles Chart. The song was written by Lukas Forchhammer, Sebastian Fogh, Stefan Forrest, Morten Ristorp and Mark Falgren.

== Chart performance ==
Chart (2012)	Peak position
Denmark (Tracklisten)	4

== Release history ==
Region	Date	Format	Label
Denmark	March 2012	Digital download; CD	Copenhagen Records
