= 7 Years (Lukas Graham song) =

2015 single by Lukas Graham

Single by Lukas Graham

from the album Lukas Graham
- Released: 18 September 2015
- Genre: Soul-pop
- Length: 3:59
- Label: Copenhagen; Warner Bros.
- Songwriters: Lukas Forchhammer; Stefan Forrest; Morten Ristorp; Morten Pilegaard
- Producers: Future Animals; Pilo

Lukas Graham singles chronology
"Strip No More" (2015)	"7 Years" (2015)	"Golden" (2016)

Music video
- "7 Years" on YouTube

"7 Years" is a song by Danish soul-pop band Lukas Graham from their second studio album, Lukas Graham. The song was released as a digital download on Lukas Forchhammer's 27th birthday (18 September 2015) by Copenhagen Records. The lyric video was uploaded to YouTube on 17 November 2015, and the music video was uploaded on 15 December 2015.

Despite receiving mixed reviews from music critics, "7 Years" topped the Danish Singles Chart. Outside Denmark, the singles topped the charts in Australia, Austria, Canada, Italy, New Zealand, the Republic of Ireland, Sweden, and the United Kingdom, while peaking within the top ten of the charts in many other European countries and the United States. The song was written by Lukas Forchhammer, Stefan Forrest, Morten Ristorp, and Morten "Pilo" Pilegaard. The song was produced by Forrest and Ristorp under their stage name Future Animals, and Pilegaard. The song was mixed by Delbert Bowers and Pilegaard.

On 12 February 2017, "7 Years" was nominated for three Grammy Awards: Record of the Year, Song of the Year, and Best Pop Duo/Group Performance. According to the International Federation of the Phonographic Industry (IFPI), "7 Years" was the seventh best-selling song of 2016 worldwide with 10.4 million digital downloads and track-equivalent streams.

== Background ==
In the interviews with Jeep, Lukas Graham mentioned that the song does not have a hook or a fixed structure and that the song simply has a vibe that progresses through the ages, allowing listeners to grow with it.

Frontman Lukas Forchhammer described "7 Years" as a song that summarises his life so far and what he hopes to achieve in the future. He continued: "It's a song about growing older. I'm also coming to a realisation that being a father is the most important thing. My biggest dream is not to be some negative old dude, but to have my kids' friends say, 'You're going to visit your dad? Say hi! He's awesome.' I had a perfect father."

Regarding the band's prior failure to break into the international market, Forchhammer stated, "It's like my father died at exactly the right moment – and I know that's something I shouldn't say, but I just did! If my dad hadn't died in 2012 I wouldn't have written our song 'Happy Home', which catapulted us into a Scandinavian success story. I wouldn't have written '7 Years', which got us signed to a publisher in America and ultimately signed to Warner Bros."

== Composition ==
"7 Years" is a soul-pop song with hip hop influences, written in the key of G minor with a chord progression of Gm-Bb-Eb-F. It runs at 120 bpm. It is accompanied by a mid-tempo piano line, a percussion backbeat, slideshow projector incorporations, and a synthesized string section.

== Critical reception ==
"7 Years" received mixed reviews from critics. Danish newspaper Jyllands-Posten critic Anders Houmøller Thomsen compared the song to the Beatles' "When I'm Sixty-Four": "'7 Years' bubbles with ignited storytelling about life's fast speed, when the daydreams of childhood and youth suddenly becomes replaced by retirement-melancholia. Graham finds his own path between sweet sentimentality and heartbreaking empathy, and like a young McCartney, Graham also has a similar instinctive ability to craft superglue-sticking choruses."

However, Time magazine named "7 Years" one of the Top 10 Worst Songs of 2016, saying, "Good luck explaining the meteoric popularity of this (yes, catchy) chewy contemporary pop-rock ballad, which makes a listener yearn for the artistic integrity of a band like Maroon 5."

== Chart performance ==
For the issue dated 6 February 2016, "7 Years" debuted at number 96 on the US Billboard Hot 100 chart. It became Lukas Graham's first single on the Hot 100. The song peaked at number two on the chart dated 9 April 2016, and became the highest-charting Danish act since "Apache" (1961) by Jørgen Ingmann. The song stayed there for four non-consecutive weeks, being held off of the top spot by Rihanna and Drake's "Work" (the reverse happened in the UK) and Desiigner's "Panda". "7 Years" also debuted at number 28 on the US Digital Songs chart with 26,000 digital copies sold. During 2016, the song sold 2.089 million copies in the US, making it the fourth best-selling song of the year. "7 Years" was the biggest hit in the US by a foreign-born act since Gotye's "Somebody That I Used to Know" in 2012.

On 12 February 2016, "7 Years" peaked at number one on the UK Singles Chart, with combined weekly sales of 105,000 units (including 3.65 million streams). The song became the first number-one single by a Danish act since Aqua's "Turn Back Time" (1998). On 11 March 2016, "7 Years" spent its fifth consecutive week at number one, becoming the longest-running number-one single by a Danish act. On 18 March 2016, "7 Years" was replaced by Mike Posner's "I Took a Pill in Ibiza" at number one, selling 261 copies fewer than Posner. It was the best-selling song in the UK in 2016 with 856,559 copies sold that year, although as it had fewer streams than Drake's "One Dance", which gave "7 Years" a combined total 1.49 million units against "One Dance"'s 1.95 million, it was ranked number 2 on the chart.

"7 Years" peaked at number one on the Australian Singles Chart, which makes Lukas Graham only the third Danish act to chart at number one (since Cut 'N' Move's "Give It Up", and Aqua's "Barbie Girl" and "Doctor Jones"). On the chart issue dated 11 April 2016, "7 Years" spent its eighth consecutive week at number one, becoming the longest-running number-one single by a Danish act. It overtook the previous record set by Aqua's "Doctor Jones", which spent seven consecutive weeks at number one in 1997–98.

== Music video and lyrics ==
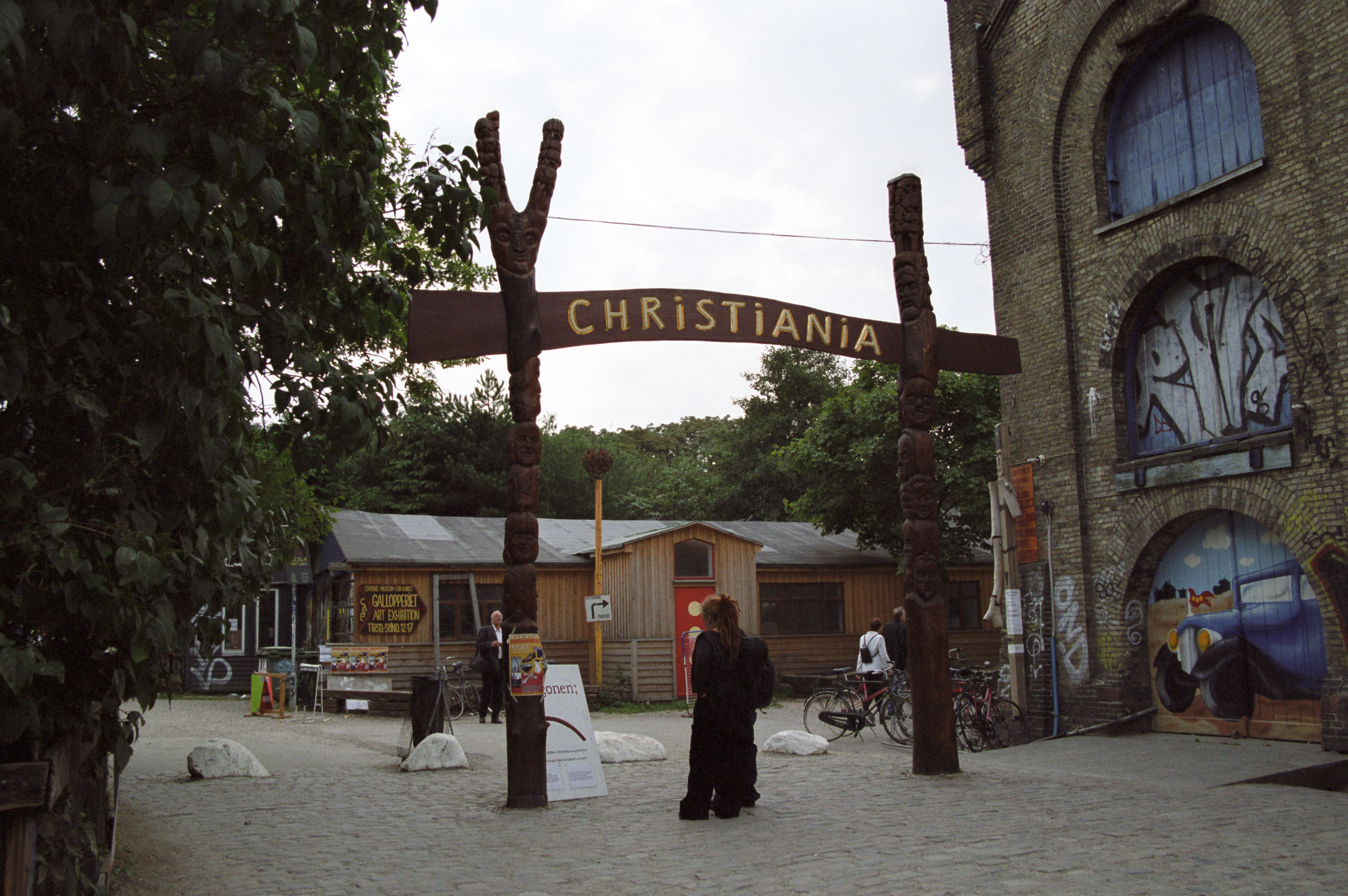
The video was shot partially in Christiania, Copenhagen, the birthplace of Lukas Forchhammer.

The official music video for "7 Years" was first released on YouTube on 15 December 2015 at a total length of four minutes. Filmed in Copenhagen and Los Angeles, the video was written, directed, and edited by Danish film director René Sascha Johannsen.

In the interviews with Billboard, Lukas Forchhammer shared that "7 Years" was composed quite swiftly, coming together in just a few hours. He described the process as capturing a raw and spontaneous emotional flow, mentioning on Billboard that it took three and a half hours to write the entire song.

The line "By 11, smoking herb and drinking burning liquor" is sometimes censored or skipped by radio stations, due to regulations to avoid references to drugs in airplay.

== Cover versions ==
British singer Jasmine Thompson released a cover version of the song on 22 April 2016 through Atlantic Records.

On 24 April 2016, Dutch singer Jan Versteegh released a cover version of the song through 8Ball Music, which was later included on his debut album, It Takes Swing, which was released on 13 May 2016.

British singer Conor Maynard covered the song on the album Covers, which was released on 5 August 2016 by Parlophone.

Linkin' Bridge, an American musical group from Louisville, Kentucky, covered the song during the semi-finals of NBC's America's Got Talent season 11 on 14 September 2016.

== Track listing ==
Digital download
No.	Title	Length
1.	"7 Years"	3:59

12" vinyl
No.	Title	Length
1.	"7 Years" (album version)	3:57
2.	"7 Years" (live from Denmark)	4:07

== Charts ==
=== Weekly charts ===
Chart (2015–2016)	Peak position
Argentina (Monitor Latino)	6
Australia (ARIA)	1
Austria (Ö3 Austria Top 40)	1
Belgium (Ultratop 50 Flanders)	1
Belgium (Ultratop 50 Wallonia)	4
Brazil (Billboard Hot 100)	4
Canada Hot 100 (Billboard)	1
Canada AC (Billboard)	1
Canada CHR/Top 40 (Billboard)	3
Canada Hot AC (Billboard)	1
Czech Republic Airplay (ČNS IFPI)	2
Czech Republic Singles Digital (ČNS IFPI)	1
Denmark (Tracklisten)	1
Ecuador (National-Report)	19
Europe (Euro Digital Songs)	1
Finland (Suomen virallinen lista)	5
France (SNEP)	5
Germany (GfK)	6
Hungary (Rádiós Top 40)	6
Hungary (Stream Top 40)	3
Hungary (Single Top 40)	3
Iceland (Tónlistinn)	1
Ireland (IRMA)	1
Israel International Airplay (Media Forest)	2
Italy (FIMI)	1
Latvia (Latvijas Top 40)	2
Luxembourg Digital Songs (Billboard)	2
Netherlands (Dutch Top 40)	1
Netherlands (Single Top 100)	3
New Zealand (Recorded Music NZ)	1
Norway (VG-lista)	4
Poland Airplay (ZPAV)	2
Portugal (AFP)	2
Scottish Singles Sales (Official Charts)	1
Serbia (Radiomonitor)	5
Slovakia Airplay (ČNS IFPI)	3
Slovakia Singles Digital (ČNS IFPI)	2
Slovenia (SloTop50)	1
South Africa Airplay (EMA)	6
South Korea International Chart (Gaon)	13
Spain (PROMUSICAE)	3
Sweden (Sverigetopplistan)	1
Switzerland (Schweizer Hitparade)	3
UK Singles (Official Charts)	1
US Billboard Hot 100	2
US Adult Contemporary (Billboard)	2
US Adult Pop Airplay (Billboard)	1
US Pop Airplay (Billboard)	1
US Rhythmic Airplay (Billboard)	33
US Rock & Alternative Airplay (Billboard)	24

=== Year-end charts ===
Chart (2015)	Position
Sweden (Sverigetopplistan)	21
Chart (2016)	Position
Argentina (Monitor Latino)	84
Australia (ARIA)	3
Austria (Ö3 Austria Top 40)	16
Belgium (Ultratop Flanders)	4
Belgium (Ultratop Wallonia)	40
Brazil (Brasil Hot 100)	40
Canada (Canadian Hot 100)	7
Denmark (Tracklisten)	8
Germany (Official German Charts)	22
Hungary (Single Top 40)	19
Iceland (Plötutíóindi)	47
Israel (Media Forest)	9
Italy (FIMI)	9
Netherlands (Dutch Top 40)	13
Netherlands (Single Top 100)	10
New Zealand (Recorded Music NZ)	2
Poland (ZPAV)	20
Slovenia (SloTop50)	12
Spain (PROMUSICAE)	21
Sweden (Sverigetopplistan)	26
Switzerland (Schweizer Hitparade)	6
UK Singles (Official Charts Company)	2
US Billboard Hot 100	12
US Adult Contemporary (Billboard)	10
US Adult Top 40 (Billboard)	10
US Mainstream Top 40 (Billboard)	22
Chart (2017)	Position
Hungary (Rádiós Top 40)	31
Chart (2024)	Position
Hungary (Rádiós Top 40)	90
Chart (2025)	Position
Hungary (Rádiós Top 40)	76

=== Decade-end charts ===
Chart (2010–2019)	Position
Australia (ARIA)	65
UK Singles (Official Charts Company)	30

== Certifications ==
Region	Certification	Certified units/sales
Australia (ARIA)	6× Platinum	420,000^{‡}
Austria (IFPI Austria)	Gold	15,000^{‡}
Belgium (BRMA)	2× Platinum	40,000^{‡}
Canada (Music Canada)	Diamond	800,000^{‡}
Denmark (IFPI Danmark)	8× Platinum	720,000^{‡}
France (SNEP)	Diamond	233,333^{‡}
Germany (BVMI)	3× Gold	600,000^{‡}
Italy (FIMI)	5× Platinum	250,000^{‡}
Netherlands (NVPI)	Platinum	30,000^{‡}
New Zealand (RMNZ)	8× Platinum	240,000^{‡}
Poland (ZPAV)	4× Platinum	80,000^{‡}
Portugal (AFP)	3× Platinum	30,000^{‡}
Spain (Promusicae)	3× Platinum	180,000^{‡}
Sweden (GLF)	8× Platinum	320,000^{‡}
Switzerland (IFPI Switzerland)	Gold	15,000^{‡}
United Kingdom (BPI)	6× Platinum	3,600,000^{‡}
United States (RIAA)	12× Platinum	12,000,000^{‡}
^{*} Sales figures based on certification alone.^{‡} Sales+streaming figures based on certification alone.

== Release history ==
Region	Date	Format	Label
Denmark	18 September 2015	Digital download	Copenhagen
Worldwide	22 October 2015	Digital download	Warner Bros.
