= Capital Letters (song) =

2018 single by Hailee Steinfeld and BloodPop

Single by Hailee Steinfeld and BloodPop

from the album Fifty Shades Freed: Original Motion Picture Soundtrack
- Released: January 12, 2018
- Genre: Pop
- Length: 3:39
- Label: Universal Studios; Republic
- Songwriters: Rachel Keen; Andrew Jackson; Ellie Goulding; Ely Weisfeld; Hailee Steinfeld; Michael Tucker
- Producers: Benjamin Rice; BloodPop

Hailee Steinfeld singles chronology
| "Let Me Go" (2017) | "Capital Letters" (2018) | "Colour" (2018) |

BloodPop singles chronology
| "Friends" (2017) | "Capital Letters" (2018) | "A Good Night" (2018) |

Music video
- "Capital Letters" on YouTube

"Capital Letters" is a song by American singer Hailee Steinfeld and American record producer BloodPop. It was written by Steinfeld, BloodPop, Raye, Andrew Jackson, Ellie Goulding and Ely Weisfeld, with production handled by BloodPop and Benjamin Rice. The song was released via Universal Studios and Republic Records on January 12, 2018, as the second single from the soundtrack to the film Fifty Shades Freed (2018).

== Background ==
The song was first revealed when the track list of the soundtrack was released. On January 10, 2018, Steinfeld teased the song via Twitter with an audio preview.

== Critical reception ==
Madeline Roth of MTV News wrote that the song features a "synthy dance beat" and felt it "lacks in raunchiness" and instead "makes up for with pure, high-flying emotion". Sam Damshenas of Gay Times opined that the song is "very romantic", calling it "a total banger". Monica Sisavat of PopSugar wrote that the song is "extremely sexy" and "will have you on your feet in a matter of seconds". Shaun Kitchener of Daily Express was disappointed as "it's not the much-hyped sing-song from Jamie Dornan", but still regarded the song as "a great pop nugget". Mike Wass of Idolator described the first two songs from the soundtrack album as "plodding bedroom anthems", deeming this song "a raunchy, club-ready anthem".

== Credits and personnel ==
Credits adapted from Tidal.

- Hailee Steinfeld – vocals, songwriting
- BloodPop – songwriting, production
- Ben Rice – production, record engineering
- Andrew Jackson – songwriting
- Ellie Goulding – songwriting
- Ely Weisfeld – songwriting
- Raye – songwriting
- Pete Anthony – orchestra conducting
- David Buckley – orchestra conducting
- Serban Ghenea – mixing

== Charts ==
Chart performance for "Capital Letters"
| Chart (2018) | Peak position |
|---|---|
| Australia (ARIA) | 32 |
| Austria (Ö3 Austria Top 40) | 24 |
| Belgium (Ultratop 50 Flanders) | 27 |
| Belgium (Ultratip Bubbling Under Wallonia) | 4 |
| Canada Hot 100 (Billboard) | 69 |
| Czech Republic Airplay (ČNS IFPI) | 50 |
| Czech Republic Singles Digital (ČNS IFPI) | 11 |
| Denmark (Tracklisten) | 34 |
| France (SNEP) | 21 |
| Germany (GfK) | 32 |
| Hungary (Single Top 40) | 9 |
| Hungary (Stream Top 40) | 19 |
| Ireland (IRMA) | 38 |
| Netherlands (Single Top 100) | 72 |
| New Zealand Heatseekers (RMNZ) | 8 |
| Norway (VG-lista) | 17 |
| Poland Airplay (ZPAV) | 6 |
| Portugal (AFP) | 31 |
| Scottish Singles Sales (Official Charts) | 33 |
| Slovakia Singles Digital (ČNS IFPI) | 15 |
| Spain (Promusicae) | 95 |
| Sweden (Sverigetopplistan) | 42 |
| Switzerland (Schweizer Hitparade) | 31 |
| UK Singles (Official Charts) | 39 |
| US Bubbling Under Hot 100 (Billboard) | 12 |

== Certifications ==
Certifications for "Capital Letters"
| Region | Certification | Certified units/sales |
|---|---|---|
| Australia (ARIA) | 2× Platinum | 140,000^{‡} |
| Brazil (Pro-Música Brasil) | 2× Platinum | 80,000^{‡} |
| Canada (Music Canada) | Platinum | 80,000^{‡} |
| Denmark (IFPI Danmark) | Gold | 45,000^{‡} |
| Germany (BVMI) | Gold | 200,000^{‡} |
| Italy (FIMI) | Gold | 25,000^{‡} |
| New Zealand (RMNZ) | Platinum | 30,000^{‡} |
| Poland (ZPAV) | Gold | 25,000^{‡} |
| Spain (Promusicae) | Gold | 30,000^{‡} |
| United Kingdom (BPI) | Silver | 200,000^{‡} |
^{‡} Sales+streaming figures based on certification alone.
