= Heat (Scarlet Pleasure song) =

Single by Scarlet Pleasure

from the album Youth is Wasted on the Young
- Released: March 15, 2015
- Recorded: 2015
- Genre: Pop
- Length: 3:15
- Label: Copenhagen Records
- Songwriter(s): Emil Goll, Alexander Malone, Joachim Dencker, David Mørup, Niclas Petersen, Jannik Thomsen
- Producer(s): David Mørup

Scarlet Pleasure singles chronology
"The Strip" (2014)	"Heat" (2015)	"Wanna Know" (2015)

"Heat" is a song recorded by the Danish band Scarlet Pleasure. This song is the most selling of Scarlet Pleasure and is produced by David Mørup and mixed by Jean-Marie Horvat, who also mixed for stars like Michael Jackson, Rihanna, Chris Brown and Jessie J.

== Charts ==
The song reached No. 14 in the Tracklisten, the Danish Singles Chart, after release on Copenhagen Records / Universal Music.

Chart (2015)	Peak position
Denmark (Tracklisten)	14
