= Rock Hard Power Spray =

Danish rock band

- Origin: Copenhagen / Odense, Denmark
- Genres: Hard rock Alternative metal Garage rock Punk rock
- Label: Copenhagen Records
- Members: Matt; Fred; Ask Fxxx; Simon
- Website: http://www.rockhardpowerspray.com

Rock Hard Power Spray was a Danish rock band from Odense, that was founded in 2004 and consisted of Frederik Valentin, Mattias Hundebøll, Ask Fogh, and Simon Andersen. They have made three albums: Commercial Suicide in 2006, Trigger Nation in 2008, and If You Think Our Last Two Records Sucked You're Gonna Love This One in 2010. The group disbanded in 2014. They did a single reunion concert in 2021.

In 2005, the band won the international edition of the music competition Emergenza in Germany, earning them a fully paid promotional tour in the United States (the Warped Tour). In 2006, the band went on a European tour with the Bloodhound Gang. Rock Hard Power Spray have performed almost 500 concerts internationally.

== Lineup ==
- Matt - Vocals, guitar (2004 -)
- Fred - Guitar, Vocals (2004 -)
- Ask Fxxx - Bass (2004 -)
- Simon - Drums (2004 -)

== Discography ==
=== Albums ===
- Commercial Suicide (2006)
- Trigger Nation (2008)
- If You Think Our Last Two Records Sucked You're Gonna Love This One! (2010)

=== DVDs ===
- Rock'n'Fuck
