= Silja =

Silja is a feminine given name used in the Nordic countries and Germany. The Danish/Norwegian equivalent is Silje.

In Finnish, it is a derived from the name Cecilia (of Saint Cecilia).

== People ==
- Silja Walter (1919–2011), Swiss author
- Silja Vöneky (born 1969), German jurist
- Anja Silja (born 1940), German soprano
- Silja Känsäkoski (born 1997), Finnish swimmer
- Silja Lehtinen (born 1985), Finnish sailor
- Silja Suija (born 1974), Estonian cross-country skier
- Silja Kanerva (born 1985), Finnish sailor
- Silja Ekeland Bjørkly (born 1976), Norwegian politician
- Silja Kosonen (born 2002), Finnish hammer thrower
- Silja Tarvonen (born 1985), Finnish orienteering competitor
- Silja Dögg Gunnarsdóttir (born 1973), Icelandic politician

== Companies ==
- Silja Line (originally just Silja), Finnish cruise shipping brand
  - MS Silja Europa
  - MS Silja Serenade
  - MS Silja Symphony
