= Celina Ree =

Danish pop rock singer and songwriter (born 1990)

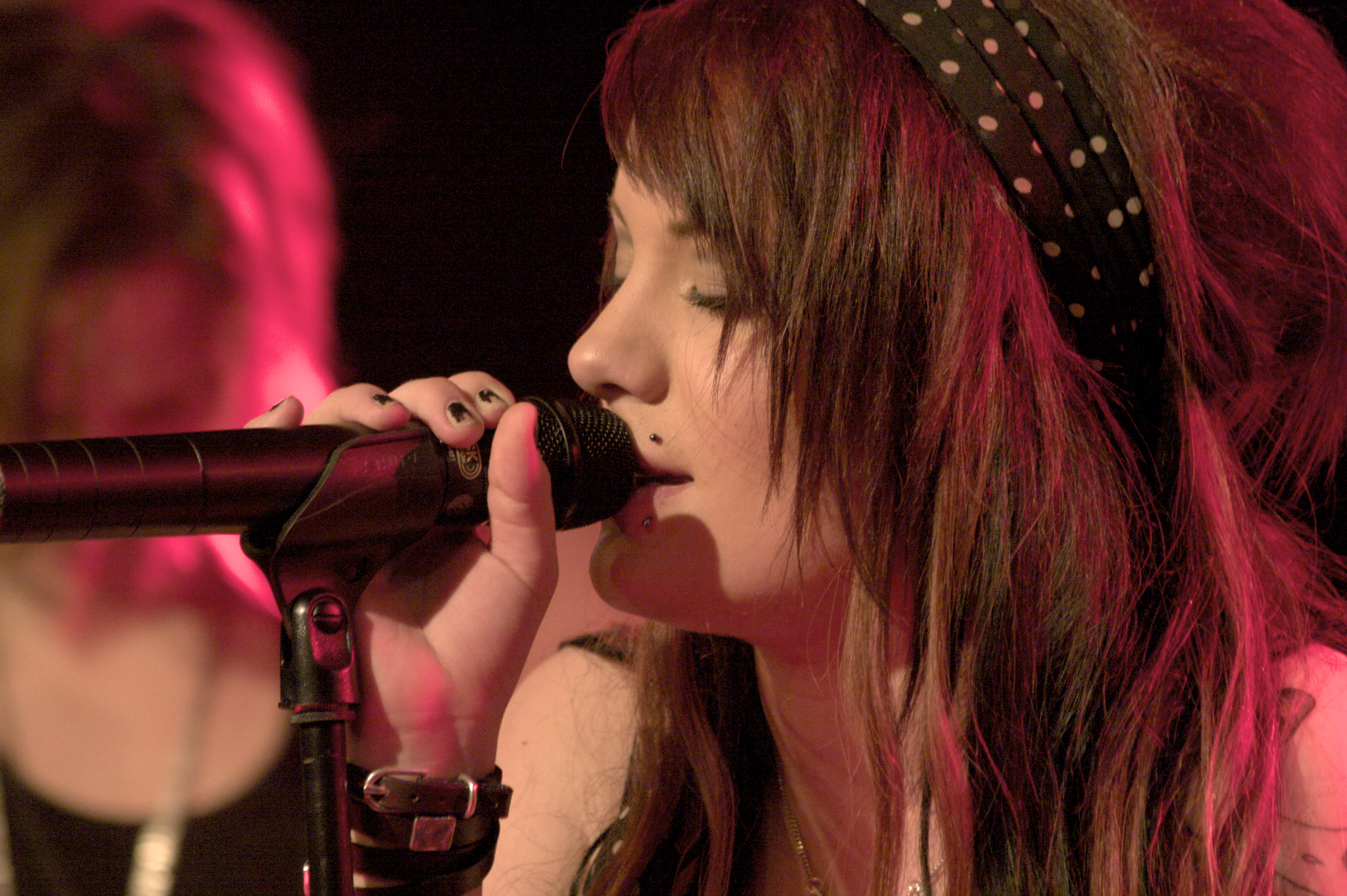
- Celina Ree in Aalborg

Background information
- Born: 3 March 1990 (age 35)
- Origin: Denmark
- Genres: Pop rock
- Instrument(s): Vocal, Piano
- Years active: 2008 – present
- Labels: Copenhagen Records, RB Sound

Celina Ree (born 3 March 1990) is a Danish pop rock singer and songwriter.

Her first single "Kortslutning" (Short circuits) was released in the summer of 2008 and enjoyed frequent airplay on several Danish radio stations. Her debut album "Kortslutning" was released on 6 October 2008. She is also featured in the song "Land's End" by the band Star*Rats (released 2010), and in the song "Stranded" by the band "The Army" (released 2013), where she sang both songs in English.

Aside from a few gigs with various artists, she has since been running an online business called Wild & Feather (formerly Celina Home Decor). In March 2018, she released her first single in almost a decade entitled "Aldrig Alene" (Never Alone).

== Discography ==
=== Albums ===
- 2008: Kortslutning

=== Singles ===
- 2008: "12. time" (12th hour)
- 2008: "Kortslutning" (Short circuits)
- 2009: "Når Du Rør Ved Mig" (When you touch me)
- 2009: "Se Dig Selv i Mig" (See yourself in me)
- 2010: "Neverland" (Promo)
- 2018: "Aldrig Alene" (Never Alone)

=== Singles (as a featured artist) ===
- 2010: "Land's End" (Star*Rats Ft. Celina Ree)
- 2013: "Stranded" (The Army Ft. Celina Ree)
- 2016: "Cherry Trees" (ABO Ft. Celina Ree)
