= Youth Is Wasted on the Young (Scarlet Pleasure album) =

Studio album by Scarlet Pleasure
- Released: May 13, 2016
- Recorded: 2014–2016
- Genre: Pop
- Label: Copenhagen; Universal
- Producer: Om'Mas Keith, David Mørup, Ronni Vindahl

Scarlet Pleasure chronology
Mirage (2014)	Youth Is Wasted on the Young (2016)

Singles from Youth Is Wasted on the Young
- 1. "Heat" Released: 16 March 2015; 2. "Wanna Know" Released: 2 October 2015; 3. "Casual" Released: 4 March 2016; 4. "Fade In" Released: 22 April 2016; 5. "Moments" Released: 4 May 2016

Youth Is Wasted on the Young is the first studio album by the Danish band Scarlet Pleasure. It was released on May 13, 2016, approximately two years after their debut EP Mirage. It consists of 13 tracks recorded over two years. The songs "Sometimes", "Moments", and "Midnight Soldier" on the album were produced by Om'Mas Keith, who has also produced for Jay Z, John Legend, and Frank Ocean. The song "Blow" was produced by Ronni Vindahl. The rest of the album is produced by David Mørup.

== Track listing ==
No.	Title	Length
1.	"Fade In"	2:28
2.	"Wanna Know"	3:22
3.	"Windy"	3:26
4.	"Casual"	3:33
5.	"Blow"	3:17
6.	"Inferno"	1:17
7.	"Moments"	4:19
8.	"Heat"	3:13
9.	"Midnight Soldier"	3:32
10.	"Sometimes"	3:38
11.	"Club Life"	3:17
12.	"Youth Is Wasted on the Young"	3:03
13.	"Venus" (bonus)	3:42

== Charts ==
Chart (2016)	Peak position
Danish Albums (Hitlisten)	16
