= A Good Night =

Single by John Legend featuring BloodPop
- Released: April 6, 2018
- Recorded: 2018
- Length: 3:23
- Label: John Legend Music; Columbia
- Songwriter(s): John Stephens; Rachel Keen; Alexandra Yatchenko; Michael Tucker
- Producer(s): BloodPop

John Legend singles chronology
"Surefire" (2017)	"A Good Night" (2018)	"Preach" (2019)

BloodPop singles chronology
"Capital Letters" (2017)	"A Good Night" (2018)	"Newman" (2019)

"A Good Night" is a song by American singer-songwriter John Legend. It was written by Raye, Sasha Sloan, and BloodPop and produced by BloodPop. Released as a single by John Legend Music and Columbia Records on April 6, 2018, it reached number seven on the US Billboard Adult R&B Songs.

== Music video ==
An accompanying music video was directed by Mishka Kornai. Produced by Ryan Huffman for Whitelist.tv in conjunction with Google, it was captured entirely on 23 Google Pixel 2 smartphones. Legend commented that "the song and the video are about a magical night where you meet someone you immediately connect with and can envision a future together [...] You’re single, dating, probably using all the apps people use now (I haven’t dated since the advent of Tinder, etc, but it’s a fascinating era in romance), and not finding someone special. But one night – maybe caught up in the music or the drinks or whatever – you meet someone that changes everything."

== Personnel ==
Credits adapted from the liner notes of "A Good Night".

- Backing vocals – Raye, Sasha Sloan
- Engineer – Mark "Exit" Goodchild
- Guitar – Johnny Natural
- Keyboards, bass – Ely Rise
- Mastering – Chris Gehringer
- Mixing – John Hanes, Serban Ghenea
- Production, drums – BloodPop
- Writing – John Stephens, Michael Diamond, Rachel Keen, Sasha Sloan

== Charts ==
=== Weekly charts ===
Weekly chart performance for "A Good Night"
Chart (2018)	Peak position
Hungary (Rádiós Top 40)	34
Sweden (Sverigetopplistan)	87
US Adult R&B Songs (Billboard)	7

=== Year-end charts ===
Year-end chart performance for "A Good Night"
Chart (2018)	Position
US Adult R&B Songs (Billboard)	24
