= Lukas Graham (2015 album) =

Studio album by Lukas Graham
- Released: 17 June 2015
- Genres: Pop; soul
- Length: 40:02 (standard version); 39:59 (2016 international version)
- Labels: Copenhagen; Then We Take The World; Warner Bros.
- Producers: Future Animals; Hedegaard; Pilo

Lukas Graham chronology
Lukas Graham (2012)	Lukas Graham (2015)	3 (The Purple Album) (2018)

Singles from Lukas Graham
- 1. "Mama Said" Released: 23 June 2014; 2. "Strip No More" Released: 16 June 2015; 3. "7 Years" Released: 18 September 2015; 4. "You're Not There" Released: 13 May 2016; 5. "Take the World by Storm" Released: 16 September 2016

Alternative cover
- 2016 international version cover

Lukas Graham (also known as Blue Album) is the second studio album by Danish band Lukas Graham. It was released in Denmark on 17 June 2015 through Copenhagen Records. The album includes the singles "Mama Said", "Strip No More" and "7 Years". A version of the album incorporating "Drunk in the Morning" and "Better Than Yourself (Criminal Mind Pt 2)" from the band's debut (while removing "Hayo", the interlude and "Playtime") was released internationally on 1 April 2016, serving as the band's debut album in the United States and United Kingdom.

== Artwork ==
The original Danish cover of the album takes its artwork from The Lady with the Bottles, a 1992 painting by Danish artist Lars Helweg that is based on a nude picture of the Swedish actress Anita Ekberg that appeared in the magazine Playboy during the 1950s. The American cover was designed to be less risqué; it shows a boy looking at Helweg's painting, with his arm bent in a way that covers up the woman's breasts.

== Reception ==
=== Critical reception ===
Professional ratings
Aggregate scores
Source	Rating
Metacritic	75/100
Review scores
Source	Rating
AllMusic	3.5/5 stars
Boston Globe	(favourable)
The Guardian	3/5 stars
The New York Times	(favourable)
Rolling Stone	3.5/5 stars

Lukas Graham received generally positive reviews from music critics. At Metacritic, which assigns a normalized rating out of 100 to reviews from mainstream critics, the album received an average score of 75, based on 5 reviews, which indicates "generally favorable reviews".

=== Commercial performance ===
In Denmark, Lukas Graham was released on 16 June 2015 without any promotion. The album entered the Danish Albums Chart at number one and spent 22 non-consecutive weeks at the top of the chart. It has spent 517 weeks on the whole chart, including 110 weeks in the top 10, with the last one being in its 371th charting week. In the United Kingdom, the album debuted at number two on the UK Albums Chart, with first-week sales of 24,093 copies, becoming the highest-charting album by a Danish act. Lukas Graham debuted at number one on the Australian Albums Chart, becoming the first number-one album by a Danish act since Aqua's Aquarium peaked at number one in 1998.

The album debuted at number three on the Billboard 200 in the United States, selling 34,000 copies. It is the highest-charting album by a Danish act. Danish singer Coco O previously charted at number two with the soundtrack to The Great Gatsby (2013).

In Canada, the album debuted at number one on the Canadian Albums Chart, selling 5,300 copies.

== Track listing ==
Standard version
No.	Title	Writer(s)	Producer(s)	Length
1.	"7 Years"	Lukas Forchhammer; Morten Ristorp; Stefan Forrest; Morten Pilegaard	Future Animals; Pilo	3:57
2.	"Take the World by Storm"	Forchhammer; Ristorp; Forrest; Pilegaard; Ross Golan	Future Animals; Pilo	3:11
3.	"Mama Said"	Forchhammer; Ristorp; Forrest; Pilegaard	Future Animals; Pilo	3:26
4.	"Happy Home"	Forchhammer; Ristorp; Forrest; Pilegaard; Rasmus Hedegaard; Christian Bach Worsøe	Future Animals; Pilo; Hedegaard; Worsø^{[a]}	3:37
5.	"Hayo"	Forchhammer; Ristorp; Forrest; Pilegaard; Magnus Larsson; Christopher Steven Brown	Future Animals; Pilo; Brown^{[b]}	2:52
6.	"When I Woke Up… (Interlude)"	Forchhammer; Ristorp; Forrest; Pilegaard; David Greenbaum	Future Animals; Pilo	0:49
7.	"Don't You Worry 'Bout Me"	Forchhammer; Ristorp; Forrest; Pilegaard; Brandon Beal	Future Animals; Pilo	3:10
8.	"What Happened to Perfect"	Forchhammer; Ristorp; Forrest; Pilegaard; Steven Brown; Golan	Future Animals; Pilo; Brown^{[b]}	3:56
9.	"Playtime"	Forchhammer; Ristorp; Pilegaard; Jim Duguid	Future Animals; Pilo	4:12
10.	"Strip No More"	Forchhammer; Ristorp; Forrest; Sebastian Fogh; Pilegaard; Larsson; Brandon Beal; Steven Brown; Mark Falgren	Future Animals; Pilo; Brown^{[b]}	3:27
11.	"You're Not There"	Forchhammer; Ristorp; Forrest; Pilegaard; James Alan	Future Animals; Pilo	3:21
12.	"Funeral"	Forchhammer; Ristorp; Forrest; Pilegaard; Steven Brown; Golan	Future Animals; Pilo; Brown^{[b]}	4:04

2016 international version
No.	Title	Writer(s)	Producer(s)	Length
1.	"7 Years"	Forchhammer; Ristorp; Forrest; Pilegaard	Future Animals; Pilo	3:57
2.	"Take the World by Storm"	Forchhammer; Ristorp; Forrest; Pilegaard; Golan	Future Animals; Pilo	3:11
3.	"Mama Said"	Forchhammer; Ristorp; Forrest; Pilegaard	Future Animals; Pilo	3:26
4.	"Happy Home"	Forchhammer; Ristorp; Forrest; Pilegaard; Hedegaard; Worsøe	Future Animals; Pilo; Hedegaard; Worsø^{[a]}	3:38
5.	"Drunk in the Morning"	Forchhammer; Fogh; Ristorp; Forrest; Larsson; Falgren	Future Animals; Pilo; Brown^{[b]}	3:23
6.	"Better Than Yourself (Criminal Mind Pt. 2)"	Forchhammer; Hedegaard; Brandon Beal	Future Animals; Pilo; Hedegaard	4:26
7.	"Don't You Worry 'Bout Me"	Forchhammer; Ristorp; Forrest; Pilegaard; Brandon Beal	Future Animals; Pilo	3:10
8.	"What Happened to Perfect"	Forchhammer; Ristorp; Forrest; Pilegaard; Steven Brown; Golan	Future Animals; Pilo; Brown^{[b]}	3:56
9.	"Strip No More"	Forchhammer; Ristorp; Forrest; Pilegaard; Larsson; Brandon Beal; Steven Brown; Mark Falgren	Future Animals; Pilo; Brown^{[b]}	3:26
10.	"You're Not There"	Forchhammer; Ristorp; Forrest; Pilegaard; James Alan	Future Animals; Pilo	3:22
11.	"Funeral"	Forchhammer; Ristorp; Forrest; Pilegaard; Steven Brown; Golan	Future Animals; Pilo; Brown^{[b]}	4:04

Notes

- ^{^[a]} signifies an additional producer
- ^{^[b]} signifies a co-producer

== Charts ==
=== Weekly charts ===
Chart (2015–16)	Peak position
Australian Albums (ARIA)	1
Austrian Albums (Ö3 Austria)	31
Belgian Albums (Ultratop Flanders)	18
Belgian Albums (Ultratop Wallonia)	82
Canadian Albums (Billboard)	1
Czech Albums (ČNS IFPI)	42
Danish Albums (Hitlisten)	1
Dutch Albums (Album Top 100)	23
Finnish Albums (Suomen virallinen lista)	10
French Albums (SNEP)	59
German Albums (Offizielle Top 100)	28
Irish Albums (IRMA)	5
Italian Albums (FIMI)	28
New Zealand Albums (RMNZ)	2
Norwegian Albums (VG-lista)	10
Scottish Albums (Official Charts)	2
Spanish Albums (Promusicae)	50
Swedish Albums (Sverigetopplistan)	3
Swiss Albums (Schweizer Hitparade)	34
UK Albums (Official Charts)	2
UK Independent Albums (Official Charts)	45
US Billboard 200	3

=== Year-end charts ===
Chart (2015)	Position
Danish Albums (Hitlisten)	2
Swedish Albums (Sverigetopplistan)	79
Chart (2016)	Position
Australian Albums (ARIA)	94
Belgian Albums (Ultratop Flanders)	136
Canadian Albums (Billboard)	38
Danish Albums (Hitlisten)	2
French Albums (SNEP)	171
Icelandic Albums (Plötutíóindi)	94
New Zealand Albums (RMNZ)	48
Swedish Albums (Sverigetopplistan)	7
UK Albums (OCC)	70
US Billboard 200	60
Chart (2017)	Position
Danish Albums (Hitlisten)	11
Swedish Albums (Sverigetopplistan)	76
Chart (2018)	Position
Danish Albums (Hitlisten)	8
Chart (2019)	Position
Danish Albums (Hitlisten)	15
Chart (2020)	Position
Danish Albums (Hitlisten)	13
Chart (2021)	Position
Danish Albums (Hitlisten)	13
Chart (2022)	Position
Danish Albums (Hitlisten)	15
Chart (2023)	Position
Danish Albums (Hitlisten)	17
Chart (2024)	Position
Danish Albums (Hitlisten)	19

== Certifications ==
Region	Certification	Certified units/sales
Canada (Music Canada)	Platinum	80,000^{‡}
Denmark (IFPI Danmark)	18× Platinum	360,000^{‡}
France (SNEP)	Gold	50,000^{‡}
Poland (ZPAV)	Gold	10,000^{‡}
Sweden (GLF)	Platinum	40,000^{‡}
United Kingdom (BPI)	Gold	100,000^{‡}
United States (RIAA)	Platinum	1,000,000^{‡}
^{‡} Sales+streaming figures based on certification alone.

== Release history ==
Region	Release date	Format	Label	Ref.
Denmark	17 June 2015	CD; LP; Digital download; streaming	Copenhagen	
United Kingdom	1 April 2016	CD; LP; Digital download; streaming	Warner Bros.	
United States	1 April 2016	CD; LP; Digital download; streaming	Warner Bros.	
Australia	1 April 2016	CD; LP; Digital download; streaming	Warner Bros.	
