= Strip No More =

Single by Lukas Graham

from the album Lukas Graham
- Released: 16 June 2015
- Recorded: 2014
- Genre: Pop
- Length: 3:26
- Label: Then We Take the World
- Songwriters: Lukas Forchhammer; Christopher Steven Brown; Sebastian Fogh; Stefan Forrest; Morten Ristorp; Morten Pilegaard; Magnus Larsson; Brandon O'Bryant Beal; Mark Falgren

Lukas Graham singles chronology
"Søndagsbarn" (2015)	"Strip No More" (2015)	"7 Years" (2015)

"Strip No More" is a single by Danish band Lukas Graham, about a stripper who has stopped stripping. The song was released as a digital download on 16 June 2015 through Then We Take the World. The song peaked at number one on the Danish Singles Chart. The song was written by Lukas Forchhammer, Christopher Steven Brown, Sebastian Fogh, Stefan Forrest, Morten Ristorp, Morten Pilegaard, Magnus Larsson, Brandon O'Bryant Beal and Mark Falgren.

== Chart performance ==
Chart (2015–16)	Peak position
Denmark (Tracklisten)	1

== Certifications ==
Region	Certification	Certified units/sales
Denmark (IFPI Danmark)	3× Platinum	270,000^{‡}
^{‡} Sales+streaming figures based on certification alone.

== Release history ==
Region	Date	Format	Label
Denmark	16 June 2015	Digital download	Then We Take the World
