= Ordinary Things (song) =

Single by Lukas Graham

from the album Lukas Graham
- Released: 17 October 2011
- Recorded: 2011
- Genre: Pop
- Length: 3:27
- Label: Copenhagen
- Songwriters: Lukas Forchhammer; Sebastian Fogh; Emil Nielsen; Stefan Forrest
- Producer: Backbone

Lukas Graham singles chronology
"Ordinary Things" (2011)	"Drunk in the Morning" (2012)

"Ordinary Things" is the debut single by Danish band Lukas Graham. The song was released in Denmark as a digital download on 17 October 2011 as the lead single from their self-titled debut studio album. It peaked at number two on the Danish Singles Chart. The song was written by Lukas Forchhammer, Sebastian Fogh, Emil Nielsen and Stefan Forrest.

== Charts ==
Chart (2011–12)	Peak position
Denmark (Tracklisten)	2

== Certifications ==
Region	Certification	Certified units/sales
Denmark (IFPI Danmark)	Platinum	30,000^{^}
Streaming
Denmark (IFPI Danmark)	3× Platinum	5,400,000^{†}
^{^} Shipments figures based on certification alone.^{†} Streaming-only figures based on certification alone.

== Release history ==
Region	Date	Format	Label
Denmark	17 October 2011	Digital download; CD	Copenhagen Records
