= Drunk in the Morning =

Single by Lukas Graham

from the album Lukas Graham
- Released: 13 February 2012
- Recorded: 2011
- Genre: Pop
- Length: 3:30
- Label: Copenhagen
- Songwriters: Lukas Forchhammer; Sebastian Fogh; Stefan Forrest; Morten Ristorp; Magnus Larsson; Mark Falgren
- Producer: Backbone

Lukas Graham singles chronology
"Ordinary Things" (2011)	"Drunk in the Morning" (2012)	"Criminal Mind" (2012)

"Drunk in the Morning" is a single by Danish band Lukas Graham. The song was released in Denmark as a digital download on 13 February 2012. It was released as the second single from their self-titled debut studio album. The song peaked at number one on the Danish Singles Chart. The song was written by Lukas Forchhammer, Sebastian Fogh, Stefan Forrest, Morten Ristorp, Magnus Larsson and Mark Falgren.

== Chart performance ==
Chart (2012–16)	Peak position
Austria (Ö3 Austria Top 40)	42
Denmark (Tracklisten)	1
Germany (GfK)	30
UK Singles (Official Charts Company)	127

== Certifications ==
Region	Certification	Certified units/sales
Denmark (IFPI Danmark)	4× Platinum	360,000^{‡}
^{‡} Sales+streaming figures based on certification alone.

== Release history ==
Region	Date	Format	Label
Denmark	13 February 2012	Digital download; CD	Copenhagen Records
