= Heaven (Julia Michaels song) =

Single by Julia Michaels

from the album Fifty Shades Freed: Original Motion Picture Soundtrack
- Released: January 26, 2018
- Recorded: 2017
- Genre: Pop
- Length: 3:11
- Label: Universal Studios; Republic
- Songwriters: Julia Michaels; Uzoechi Emenike; Taylor Parks; Morten Ristorp Jensen; Brian Garcia
- Producer: Morten Ristorp

Julia Michaels singles chronology
"Hurt Somebody" (2018)	"Heaven" (2018)	"Coming Home" (2018)

Music video
- "Heaven" on YouTube

"Heaven" is a song by American singer Julia Michaels. It was written by Michaels, Taylor Parks, Brian Garcia, Uzoechi Emenike and Morten Ristorp Jensen, with production handled by Morten Ristorp. The song was released via Universal Studios and Republic Records on January 26, 2018, as the third and final single from the soundtrack to the film Fifty Shades Freed (2018).

== Composition ==
"Heaven" is a mid-tempo pop song that runs for three minutes and eleven seconds. Its instrumentation consists of a "syncopated synth beat", "layers of 'ooh' vocals in the background" sung by Uzoechi Emenike and Tayla Parx, and a chord progression of Gm–D/F♯–Dm–C/E-Cm/E♭-B♭-D/F♯. Written in the key of G minor, it has a tempo of 66 beats per minute with a slowly feeling in compound duple (6/8) time.

== Critical reception ==
Christina Lee of Uproxx wrote that Michaels "manages to summarize the entire Fifty Shades franchise in just two lines: 'They say all good boys go to heaven / but bad boys bring heaven to you'". Sam Damshenas of Gay Times described it as a "hauntingly addictive track" in which "Julia reminisce on a past lover". Mike Nied of Idolator regarded the song as "a sparse and sexy ode to bad boys", writing that "it offers the budding superstar an opportunity to explore a moodier aesthetic". He felt the song of being a bit risky "considering her tendency toward contemplative bops like 'Issues,' but it more than pays off". He also found the song "dangerously addictive" and opined that it is "a little more in line with the brooding material from the franchise's earlier albums". He concluded his review by calling it "a bit of a sonic switch-up" from previous materials released from the soundtrack.

== Music video ==
The song's music video was released on February 6, 2018, and directed by Sophie Muller. In the visual, Michaels wanders around a kitchen inside an apartment, wearing a tailored suit, intercut with scenes of Michaels daydreaming half-dressed men dancing around and circle the room, and tasting ice cream from the fridge. By the end of the video, all of those men display their anger issues, echoing the "bad boys" mentioned in the song.

== Live performances ==
Michaels made a live performance debut of the track when the she performed a medley of "Heaven" and her previous single "Issues" on The Late Show with Stephen Colbert.

== Credits and personnel ==
Recording and management

- Mastered at Sterling Sound (New York City)
- Published by Warner/Chappell Music Ltd (PRS), administered by WB Music Corp., Taylor Monet Music (BMI) & Warner-Tamerlane Publishing Corp. (BMI), HALLA! HALLA! Publishing (ASCAP) & WB Music Corp. (ASCAP), Brian Garcia Pub Designee (BMI) & Warner-Tamerlane Publishing Corp. (BMI), Thanks for the Songs Richard (BMI) & Warner-Tamerlane Publishing Corp. (BMI), Universal Pictures Music (ASCAP), UPG Music Publishing (BMI)

Personnel

- Julia Michaels – vocals, songwriting
- Uzoechi Emenike – songwriting, background vocals
- Tayla Parx – songwriting, background vocals
- Morten Ristorp Jensen – songwriting
- Brian Garcia – songwriting
- Morten Ristorp Jensen – production, all instruments performing
- Serban Ghenea – mixing
- Randy Merrill – mastering

Credits adapted from Fifty Shades Freed: Original Motion Picture Soundtrack liner notes.

== Charts ==
=== Weekly charts ===
Chart (2018)	Peak position
Austria (Ö3 Austria Top 40)	62
Belgium (Ultratip Bubbling Under Flanders)	7
Canada Hot 100 (Billboard)	65
Czech Republic Singles Digital (ČNS IFPI)	20
Denmark (Tracklisten)	24
Finland (Suomen virallinen lista)	17
France (SNEP)	83
Germany (GfK)	71
Hungary (Single Top 40)	20
Hungary (Stream Top 40)	21
Ireland (IRMA)	48
Netherlands (Single Top 100)	58
New Zealand Heatseekers (RMNZ)	6
Norway (VG-lista)	4
Portugal (AFP)	43
Scottish Singles Sales (Official Charts)	56
Slovakia Singles Digital (ČNS IFPI)	23
Sweden (Sverigetopplistan)	23
Switzerland (Schweizer Hitparade)	69
UK Singles (Official Charts)	77
US Bubbling Under Hot 100 (Billboard)	8

=== Year-end charts ===
Chart (2018)	Position
Denmark (Tracklisten)	97

== Certifications ==
Region	Certification	Certified units/sales
Brazil (Pro-Música Brasil)	3× Platinum	120,000^{‡}
Canada (Music Canada)	Platinum	80,000^{‡}
Denmark (IFPI Danmark)	Platinum	90,000^{‡}
New Zealand (RMNZ)	Platinum	30,000^{‡}
Norway (IFPI Norway)	Platinum	60,000^{‡}
Poland (ZPAV)	Platinum	20,000^{‡}
Spain (Promusicae)	Gold	30,000^{‡}
United Kingdom (BPI)	Gold	400,000^{‡}
United States (RIAA)	Platinum	1,000,000^{‡}
^{‡} Sales+streaming figures based on certification alone.
