= Søndagsbarn =

Single by Suspekt featuring Lukas Graham
- Released: 22 May 2015
- Recorded: 2014
- Genre: Hip hop
- Length: 3:47
- Label: Tabu Records

Suspekt singles chronology
"S.U.S.P.E.K.T." (2014)	"Søndagsbarn" (2015)

Lukas Graham singles chronology
"Mama Said" (2014)	"Søndagsbarn" (2015)	"Strip No More" (2015)

"Søndagsbarn" is a single by Danish hip hop group Suspekt featuring vocals from Danish band Lukas Graham. The song was released as a digital download in Denmark on 22 May 2015 through Tabu Records. The song peaked at number three on the Danish Singles Chart.

== Track listing ==
Digital download
No.	Title	Length
1.	"Søndagsbarn" (feat. Lukas Graham)	3:47

== Chart performance ==
Chart (2015)	Peak position
Denmark (Tracklisten)	3

== Release history ==
Region	Date	Format	Label
Denmark	22 May 2015	Digital download	Tabu Records
