= Silje =

Silje is a Norwegian given female name. It is a short form of the Latin female name Caecilia / Cecilie from the family name Caecilius which is formed from the Latin adjective Caecus, "blind". Notable people with the name include:

- Silje Bolset, Norwegian handball player
- Silje Ekroll Jahren (born 1988), Norwegian orienteering competitor and junior world champion
- Silje Jørgensen (born 1975), former Norwegian footballer and Olympic champion
- Silje Lundberg (born 1988), Norwegian environmentalist and leader of Nature and Youth
- Silje Nergaard (born 1966), Norwegian jazz vocalist and songwriter
- Silje Nes (born 1980), Norwegian multi-instrumentalist and singer-songwriter
- Silje Norendal (born 1993), Norwegian snowboarder
- Silje Redergård (1989-1994), Norwegian murder victim
- Silje Reinåmo (born 1982), Norwegian actress, dancer and musical performer
- Silje Solberg (born 1990), Norwegian handball goalkeeper
- Silje Schei Tveitdal (born 1974), Norwegian environmentalist and politician for the Socialist Left Party
- Silje Vesterbekkmo (born 1983), Norwegian footballer
- Silje Vige (born 1976), Norwegian singer
- Silje Wergeland (born 1974), Norwegian singer-songwriter.
