= Lukas Graham (2012 album) =

- Original cover; later censored with a cropped version

Studio album by Lukas Graham
- Released: 26 March 2012
- Recorded: 2011
- Genre: Pop
- Length: 39:11 (original version); 48:16 (re-release)
- Label: Copenhagen
- Producer: Backbone

Lukas Graham chronology
Lukas Graham (2012)	Lukas Graham (2015)

Singles from Lukas Graham
- 1. "Ordinary Things" Released: 17 October 2011; 2. "Drunk in the Morning" Released: 13 February 2012; 3. "Criminal Mind" Released: 19 March 2012; 4. "Better Than Yourself (Criminal Mind Pt 2)" Released: 22 October 2012

Lukas Graham is the debut album by Danish band Lukas Graham. It was released on 26 March 2012 through Copenhagen Records, and was released internationally on 12 November 2012 by Copenhagen, and on 23 November that same year in Germany, Switzerland, and Austria by Island Records. The album entered the Danish Albums Chart at number one on and stayed on top of the chart for 15 weeks and was certified six-times platinum. It is the only album by the band to not have received a release outside of Europe.

The album includes the singles "Ordinary Things", "Drunk in the Morning", and "Criminal Mind"; the international reissue added "Better Than Yourself (Criminal Mind Pt 2)". Re-recorded versions of two songs from this album were added to the band's international version of their second album released by Warner Bros. Records in 2016.

== Track listing ==
Original Danish edition
No.	Title	Writer(s)	Producer(s)	Length
1.	"Ordinary Things"	Lukas Forchhammer; Sebastian Fogh Mads; Emil Nielsen; Stefan Forrest	Backbone	3:27
2.	"Nice Guy"	Forchhammer; Fogh; Morten Ristorp; Forrest	Backbone	3:35
3.	"Drunk in the Morning"	Forchhammer; Fogh; Morten Ristorp; Forrest; Magnús Larsson; Mark Falgren	Backbone	3:30
4.	"When You're with Me (Interlude)"	Forchhammer; Fogh; Morten Ristorp; Forrest	Backbone	1:07
5.	"Red Wine"	Forchhammer; Brandon Beal; Mauro Verdi	Brandon Beal	5:24
6.	"Apologize"	Forchhammer; Fogh; Forrest	Backbone	3:21
7.	"Criminal Mind"	Forchhammer; Fogh; Morten Ristorp; Falgren; Forrest	Backbone	3:05
8.	"Don't Hurt Me This Way"	Forchhammer; Fogh; Morten Ristorp; Forrest	Backbone	2:59
9.	"Moving Alone"	Forchhammer; Fogh; Forrest	Backbone	4:22
10.	"Oohhh (Interlude)"	Forchhammer; Fogh; Forrest	Backbone	0:37
11.	"Never Let Me Down"	Forchhammer; Fogh; Beal; Forrest	Backbone	3:26
12.	"Before the Morning Sun"	Forchhammer; Verdi	Backbone	4:18
Total length:				39:11

Re-release and German edition
No.	Title	Writer(s)	Producer(s)	Length
1.	"Ordinary Things"	Lukas Forchhammer; Sebastian Fogh Mads; Emil Nielsen; Stefan Forrest	Backbone	3:27
2.	"Nice Guy"	Forchhammer; Fogh; Morten Ristorp; Forrest	Backbone	3:35
3.	"Drunk in the Morning"	Forchhammer; Fogh; Morten Ristorp; Forrest; Magnús Larsson; Mark Falgren	Backbone	3:30
4.	"When You're with Me (Interlude)"	Forchhammer; Fogh; Morten Ristorp; Forrest	Backbone	1:07
5.	"Red Wine"	Forchhammer; Brandon Beal; Mauro Verdi	Brandon Beal	5:24
6.	"Apologize" (not on some digital releases)	Forchhammer; Fogh; Forrest	Backbone	3:21
7.	"Daddy, Now That You're Gone (Ain't No Love)"	Dan Walsh; Michael Alan Price	Backbone	4:43
8.	"Criminal Mind"	Forchhammer; Fogh; Morten Ristorp; Falgren; Forrest	Backbone	3:05
9.	"Better Than Yourself (Criminal Mind Pt 2)"	Forchhammer; Rasmus Hedegaard; Beal	Hedegaard	4:22
10.	"Don't Hurt Me This Way"	Forchhammer; Fogh; Morten Ristorp; Forrest	Backbone	2:59
11.	"Moving Alone"	Forchhammer; Fogh; Forrest	Backbone	4:22
12.	"Oohhh (Interlude)"	Forchhammer; Fogh; Forrest	Backbone	0:37
13.	"Never Let Me Down"	Forchhammer; Fogh; Beal; Forrest	Backbone	3:26
14.	"Before the Morning Sun"	Forchhammer; Verdi	Backbone	4:18
Total length:				48:16

== Chart performance ==
=== Weekly charts ===
Chart (2012)	Peak position
Danish Albums (Hitlisten)	1

=== Year-end charts ===
Chart (2016)	Position
Danish Albums (Hitlisten)	30
Chart (2017)	Position
Danish Albums (Hitlisten)	62
Chart (2018)	Position
Danish Albums (Hitlisten)	62

== Certifications ==
Region	Certification	Certified units/sales
Denmark (IFPI Danmark)	7× Platinum	140,000^{‡}
Netherlands (NVPI)	Gold	25,000^{‡}
Poland (ZPAV)	Gold	10,000^{‡}
^{‡} Sales+streaming figures based on certification alone.

== Release history ==
Region	Release date	Format	Label
Denmark	26 March 2012	Digital download; CD; LP	Copenhagen Records
