= Le Kid =

Swedish pop band

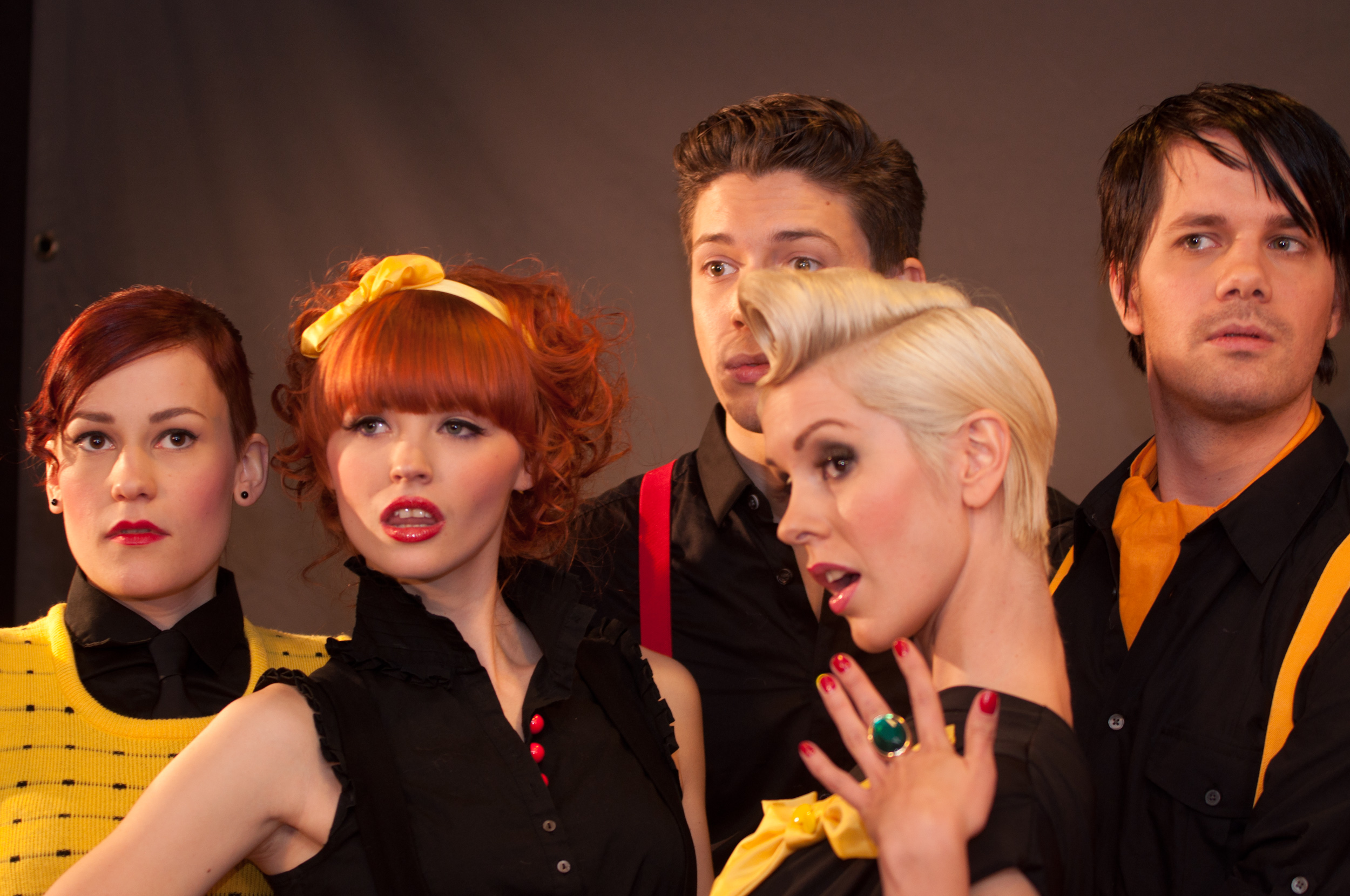
- Le Kid at Melodifestivalen 2011 press conference.

Background information
- Origin: Sweden
- Genres: Pop
- Years active: 2008–present
- Members: Johanna Berglund (singer); Helena Lillberg (singer); Märta Grauers (Drumpad & Synthesizers); Felix Persson (Keyboards & Synthesizers)
- Past members: Anton Malmberg Hård af Segerstad
- Website: Le-kid.com

Le Kid is a Swedish pop band formed in 2008 consisting of Johanna Berglund, Helena Lillberg, Märta Grauers & Felix Persson. In 2010 they had their biggest hit with their first single "Mercy Mercy". They took part in the 2011 Melodifestivalen with the song “Oh My God” and later that year they released their first studio album called “Oh Alright!”.

== Career ==
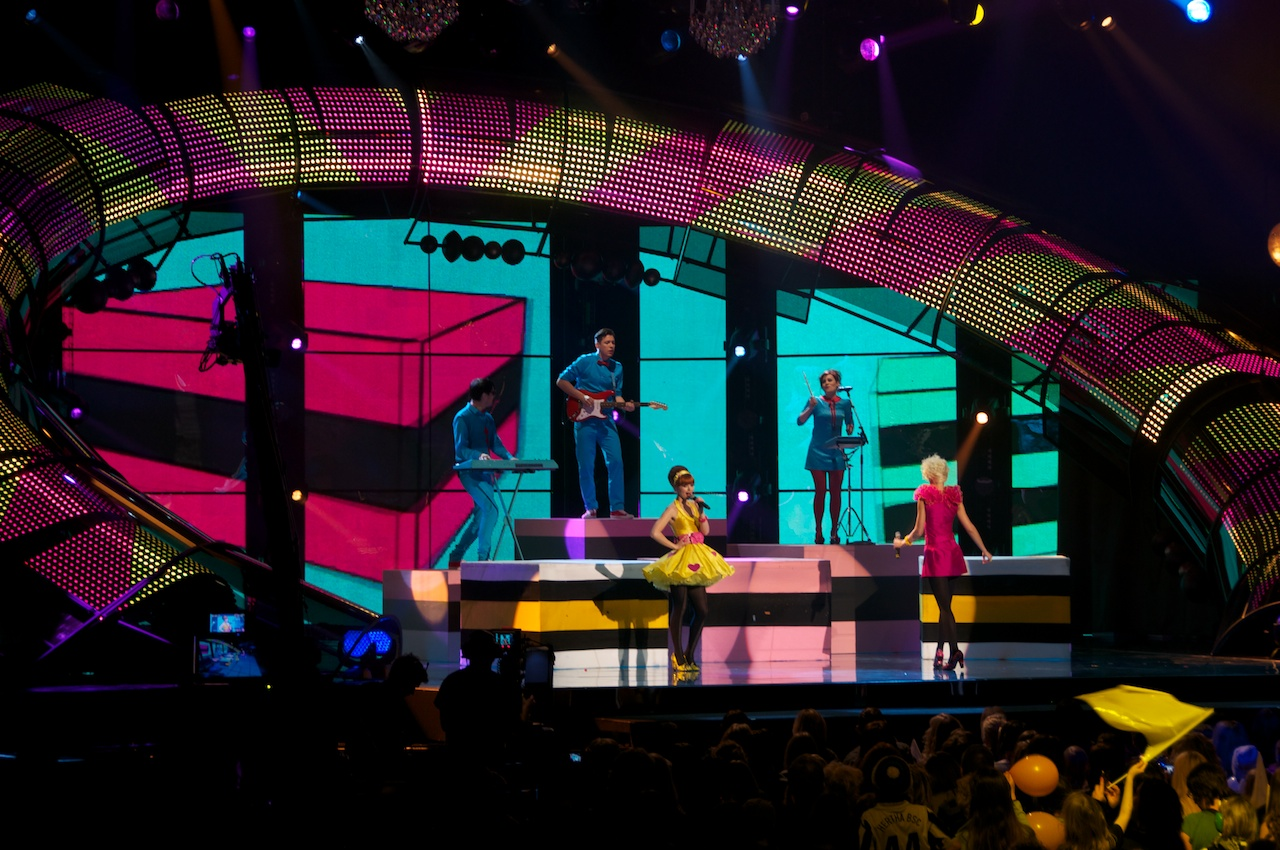
Le Kid performing at Melodifestivalen 2011

Le Kid is a Swedish pop band that was formed in 2008. In 2010 they released their first single "Mercy Mercy" achieving success in Sweden, where it was the eighth most played song on Swedish radio P3 during that year. In September 2010 they released their second single "We Should Go Home Together".

On 5 February 2011, Le Kid took part in Melodifestivalen with the song "Oh My God", written by band members Märta Grauers, Anton Malmberg Hård af Segerstad and Felix Persson. They obtained the fifth place at the first semifinal and failed to qualify to the final. The song reached number one on iTunes two days after its release.

In May 2011, they released a new single called “America” and on August of the same year they released another single called “We Are The Drums”.

In September 2011, they finally released their debut album, Oh Alright!, to positive reviews. Popjustice called it “inmense”. Scandipop wrote that it is “Easily one of the best albums of the year and also one of the, perhaps, pop albums of our generation”, and music blog Swedish Stereo described it as “one of undoubtfully best Swedish albums of 2011, pure pop with a solid production and holistic concept”.

In January 2012, Le Kid released a new single on Denmark called “Human Behaviour”; the song was used on Danish TV series, Paradise Hotel.

In June 2012, the band released a new version of “Mercy Mercy” as well as a new video to it as part of the promotion for the German release of Oh Alright!. The German version of the album is expected to include “Human Behaviour” as well as other new songs. In April 2013, the German edition of Oh Alright! having as yet been unreleased, the band released a new single, "We Are Young".

== Discography ==
=== Studio albums ===
List of studio albums, with selected chart positions and certifications
Title	Album details	Peak chart positions
Title	Album details	SWE
Oh Alright	Released 06 September 2011; Label: King Island Roxystars Recordings; Formats: CD, digital download	43
"—" denotes items which were not released in that country or failed to chart.

=== Singles ===
List of singles, with selected chart positions and certifications
Title	Year	Peak chart positions	Album
Title	Year	SWE	Album
"Mercy Mercy"	2010	—	Oh Alright
"We Should Go Home Together"	2010	—	Oh Alright
"Mr. Brightside"	2011	—	Oh Alright
"Oh My God"	2011	31	Oh Alright
"America"	2011	—	Oh Alright
"We Are the Drums"	2011	—	Oh Alright
"Human Behaviour"	2012	—	—N/a
"We Are Young"	2013	—	—N/a
"Physical"	2013	—	—N/a
"—" denotes items which were not released in that country or failed to chart.
