= Scarlet Pleasure =

Danish musical trio

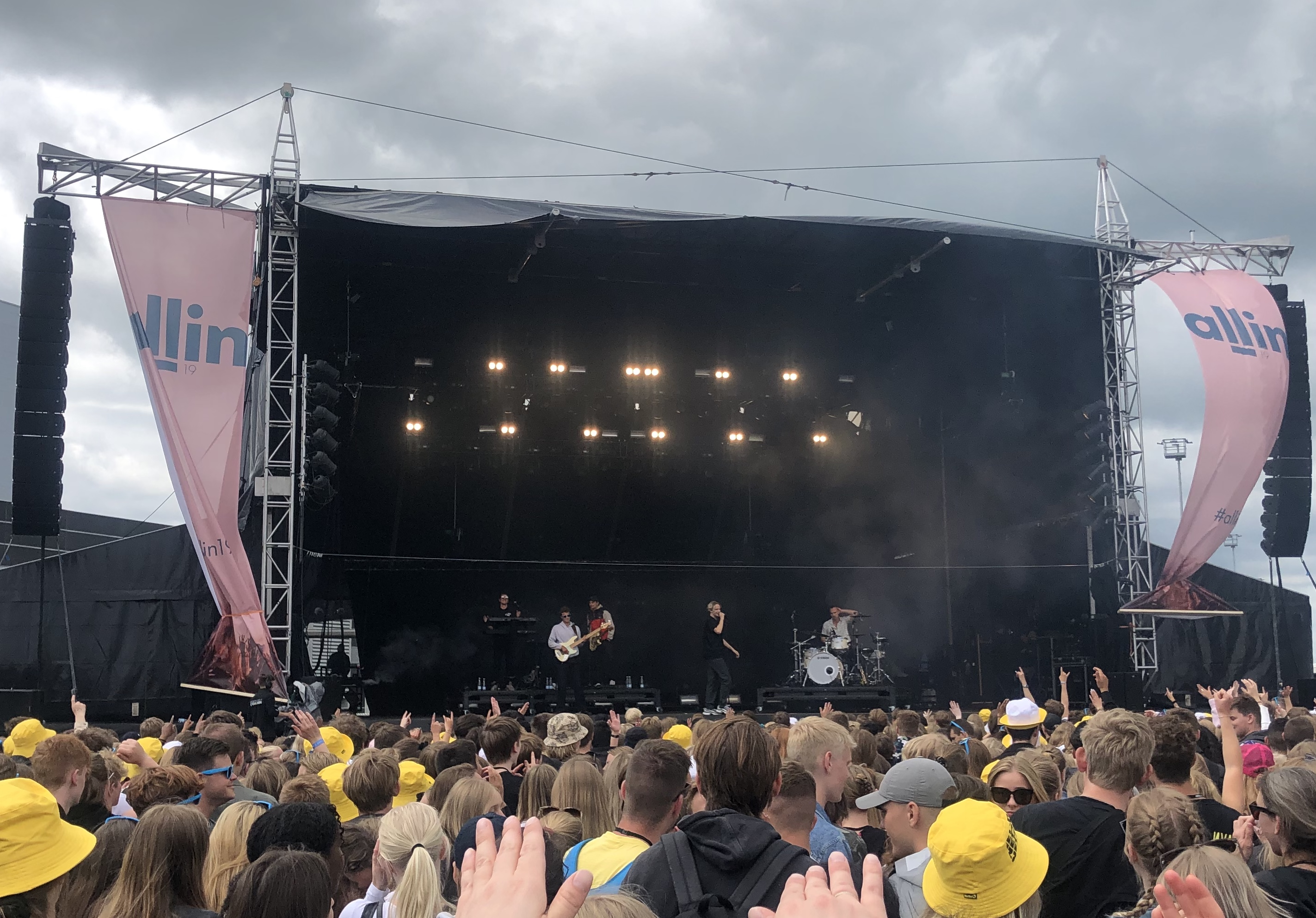
- Scarlet Pleasure live at Allin 2019 in Brabrand

Background information
- Origin: Denmark
- Genres: R&B, soul, funk, pop
- Years active: 2013–present
- Label: Copenhagen
- Members: Emil Goll; Alexander Malone; Joachim Dencker
- Website: www.scarletpleasure.dk

Scarlet Pleasure is a Danish R&B, soul, funk and pop musical trio made up of Emil Goll as lead vocals, Alexander Malone on bass and Joachim Dencker on drums. The formative years of the all-Danish trio was in New York City. They released their 2014 EP Mirage, 2016 album Youth Is Wasted on the Young and 2017 EP Limbo all charting on Tracklisten, the official Danish Albums Chart. The band is signed to Copenhagen Records.

== Discography ==
=== Studio albums ===
Year	Album	Peak positions
Year	Album	DEN
2016	Youth Is Wasted on the Young	16
2020	Garden	6
2023	Pompeii	6

=== EPs ===
Year	EP	Peak positions
Year	EP	DEN
2014	Mirage	6
2017	Limbo	2
2017	Lagune	5
2018	Let Go / Mind	—

=== Singles ===
==== As lead artist ====
Year	Single	Peak positions	Certifications	Album / EP
Year	Single	DEN	Certifications	Album / EP
2014	"Windy"	26		Mirage
2014	"Under the Palm Trees"	—		Mirage
2014	"The Strip"	—		Mirage
2015	"Heat"	14	IFPI DEN: Platinum	Youth is Wasted on the Young
2015	"Wanna Know"	—	IFPI DEN: Gold	Youth is Wasted on the Young
2016	"Casual"	—		Youth is Wasted on the Young
2016	"Fade In"	—		Youth is Wasted on the Young
2016	"Moments"	—		Youth is Wasted on the Young
2017	"Deja Vu"	4		Limbo
2017	"Limbo"	3		Limbo
2017	"Good Together"	5		Lagune
2017	"Unreliable"	17		Lagune
2018	"Let Go"	21		
2018	"Superpower"	—		
2019	"What a Life"	5		
2019	"24/7"	11		
2026	"Wide Awake" (featuring Sharma)	31		

==== As featured artist ====
Year	Single	Album / EP
2014	"Billede Af Hende (Part 2)" (Nik & Jay featuring Scarlet Pleasure)	Remix promo release
