= Better Than Yourself (Criminal Mind Pt 2) =

Single by Lukas Graham

from the album Lukas Graham
- Released: 22 October 2012
- Recorded: 2011
- Genre: Pop
- Length: 4:22
- Label: Copenhagen
- Songwriters: Lukas Forchhammer; Rasmus Hedegaard; Brandon Beal
- Producer: Rasmus Hedegaard

Lukas Graham singles chronology
"Criminal Mind" (2012)	"Better Than Yourself (Criminal Mind Pt 2)" (2012)	"Happy Home" (2014)

"Better Than Yourself (Criminal Mind Pt 2)" is a single by Danish band Lukas Graham. The song was released in Denmark as a digital download on 22 October 2012. The song peaked at number one on the Danish Singles Chart. The song was written by Lukas Forchhammer, Rasmus Hedegaard and Brandon Beal. The song's opening piano accompaniment is a direct quote from Beethoven's Moonlight Sonata.

== Chart performance ==
Chart (2012)	Peak position
Denmark (Tracklisten)	1

== Certifications ==
Region	Certification	Certified units/sales
Denmark (IFPI Danmark)	3× Platinum	5,400,000^{†}
^{^} Shipments figures based on certification alone.^{‡} Sales+streaming figures based on certification alone.^{†} Streaming-only figures based on certification alone.

== Release history ==
Region	Date	Format	Label
Denmark	22 October 2012	Digital download; CD	Copenhagen Records
