= Patrick Dorgan =

Danish singer

- Dorgan in Tivoli, Copenhagen, 2021

Background information
- Origin: Copenhagen, Denmark
- Genres: Soul, R&B
- Years active: 2014–present
- Label: Copenhagen Records
- Website: https://musik.dk/patrickdorgan

Patrick Dorgan is a Danish soul and R&B singer signed to Copenhagen Records. His debut single "On the Way Down" charted among the top three on Hitlisten. His song was also chosen as "Song of the Week" on Denmark's DR P3 Radio.

Dorgan's second single is "Marilyn". Both singles were included on his debut album Painkillers, released in January 2016.

In 2022, he was one of the finalists of the Dansk Melodi Grand Prix 2022 with the song "Vinden suser ind".

== Discography ==
=== Albums and EP ===
Year	Title	Peak positions
Year	Title	DEN
2016	Painkillers	29
2018	03:17 (EP)	
2018	Coming Home	

Year	Title	Peak positions	Album
Year	Title	DEN	Album
2014	"On The Way Down"	11	Painkillers
2015	"Marylin"		Painkillers
2015	"Painkillers"		Painkillers
2015	"Amazing"		Painkillers
2015	"Bitter"		Painkillers
2015	"I Would If I Could"		Painkillers
2015	"Risky Business"		Painkillers
2015	"Hollywood"		Painkillers
2015	"Lullaby"		Painkillers
2015	"Amy"		Painkillers
2022	"Vinden suser ind"		Melodi Grand Prix 2022

Year	Title	Peak positions	EP
2018	"No No No"		03:17 (EP)
2018	"Michelle"		03:17 (EP)
2018	"Safe Here"		03:17 (EP)
2018	"Amen"		03:17 (EP)

Year	Title	Peak positions	EP
2018	"Coming Home"		Coming Home
2018	"Vito"		Coming Home
2018	"In My Life"		Coming Home
2018	"Sally (Hold On)"		Coming Home

=== Other songs ===
- 2016: "Going Home" HEDEGAARD ft. Nabiha & Patrick Dorgan

== Awards and nominations ==
Year	Award	Category	Nominee	Result
2015	P3 Guld	P3 Guld for P3 Talentet	Patrick Dorgan	Nominated
2015	GAFFA-Prisen	GAFFA-Prisen for New Danish Name of the Year	Patrick Dorgan	Nominated
2016	Zulu Awards	Zulu Awards for New Name of the Year	Patrick Dorgan	Nominated
