= Ben Rice (producer) =

American record producer

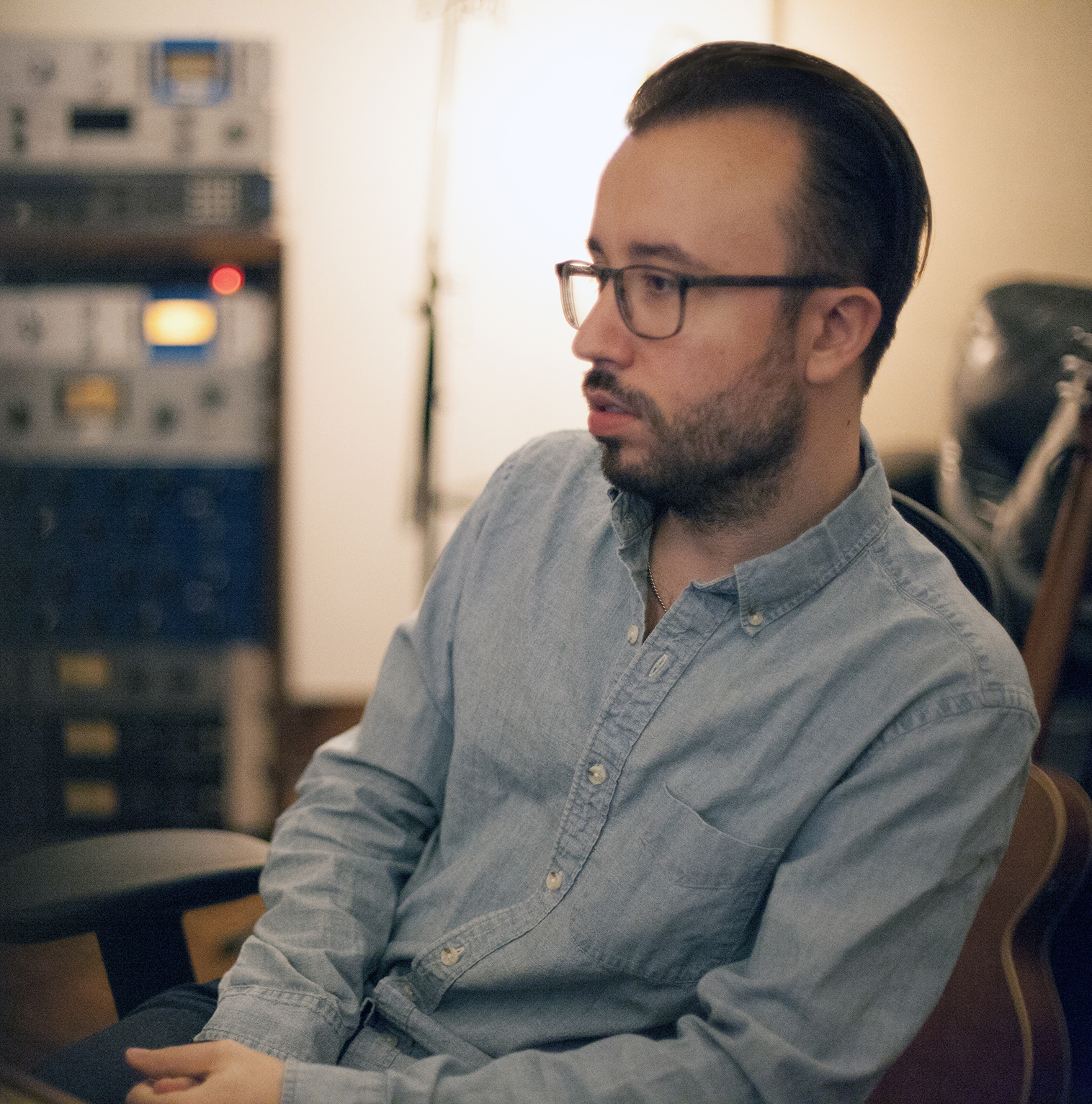
- Rice at Degraw Sound, Brooklyn, NY 2016

Background information
- Born: Brooklyn, New York, United States
- Genres: Rock; indie rock; americana; country; pop; indie pop
- Occupations: Record producer; engineer; mixer; session musician; multi-instrumentalist; guitarist; songwriter
- Instruments: Guitar; bass; vocals
- Years active: 2006–present
- Labels: Lizard King Records; Warner Music Group
- Website: Ben Rice Productions; Ben Rice Music; Degraw Sound

Ben Rice is an American record producer, sound engineer, mixer, songwriter, and musician. He is best known for his work with musical artists Valerie June, Norah Jones, The Candles, Jonas Brothers, James Bay, and The Skins, as well as record producers Eddie Kramer, Gus van Go, and Youth. In 2021 Rice received a nomination for Producer of the Year at the Americana Awards for his work on Valerie June's album “The Moon and Stars: Prescriptions For Dreamers”, which was nominated for Album of the Year.

Rice owns Degraw Sound, a recording studio in Brooklyn, New York.

== Early years ==
Fascinated by recording and songwriting, Rice began making 4-track recordings when he was twelve and landed his first studio job at the age of sixteen.

== Musical career ==
=== 2003–2009: Surefire ===
Rice formed the band Surefire with his childhood friends: Nicolas Panken (guitar), Jacob Sloan (bass), and Justin Aaronson (drums); he served as the band's lead vocalist, guitarist, and songwriter from 2003 to 2009.

==== Early success ====
Fueled by their live shows, Rice's band built a cult-following on Myspace.

This led to notable press in publications, including the New York magazine. Rice leveraged this publicity to secure a series of gigs with the Arctic Monkeys, The Bravery, Brendan Benson, Mando Diao, The Shore, The Sights, and The Subways.

Surefire's sound was often compared to the music of Tom Petty; however, Rice fused contemporary indie rock, 1960's blues rock, and 1970s psychedelic rock to produce his own unique, style of music. One music-critic noted that Rice's compositions were "quite distinctive...a purely personal musical reflection" of the eras,; this musical review was echoed by other media outlets that often compared his musical-style to Petty, Coldplay, and even Cream.

Rice's creative songwriting and compositions helped establish Surefire in the New York City music scene; before they were signed, the band was regularly selling-out shows at concert venues – including the Bowery Ballroom.

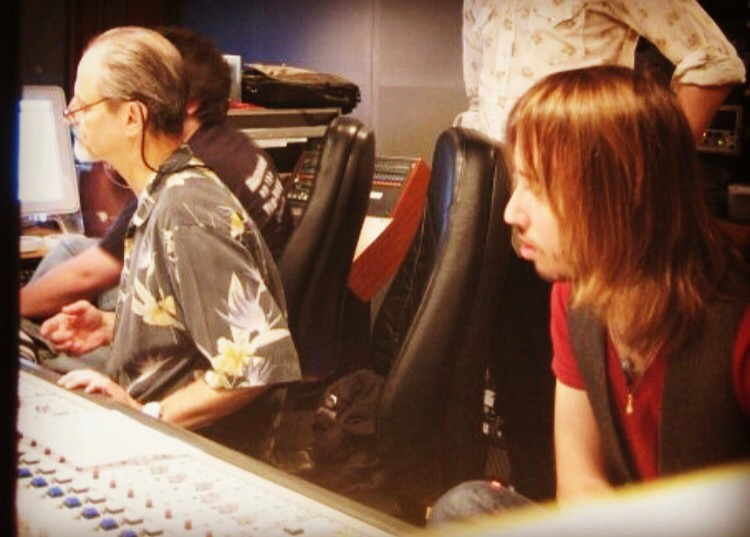
Rice in studio with Eddie Kramer

==== Lizard King Records / Warner Music Group ====
Surefire's early success afforded them an opportunity to record a series of demos with renown, record producers Gus van Go and Werner F.

Impressed by these demos, Surefire's growing fandom, and their ability to sell-out venues, Lizard King Records founder and CEO Martin Heath signed Rice and the band to his label in early 2006, which already represented artists like The Killers, The Pierces, and Santigold.

Shortly thereafter, the band again had the opportunity to record with the Gus Van Go / Werner F. team – creating an untitled EP for Lizard King Records / Warner Music Group. Unfortunately, this EP was shelved by the record label and ultimately never released.

Led by Rice, Surefire later recorded the track "Surrender" for the 2005 War Child compilation album Help!: A Day in the Life. Other artists featured on this album included Coldplay, Gorillaz, Radiohead, Keane, and Damien Rice.

==== Surefire LP and later years ====
Citing a difference in musical vision, Surefire left Lizard King Records in 2007 to independently record and release their first, full-length album. Rice co-produced this self-titled album with legendary, record producer Eddie Kramer. With the release of the record: Surefire, the band continued to tour until their disbandment in late 2009.

=== 2009–2011: Blackbells ===
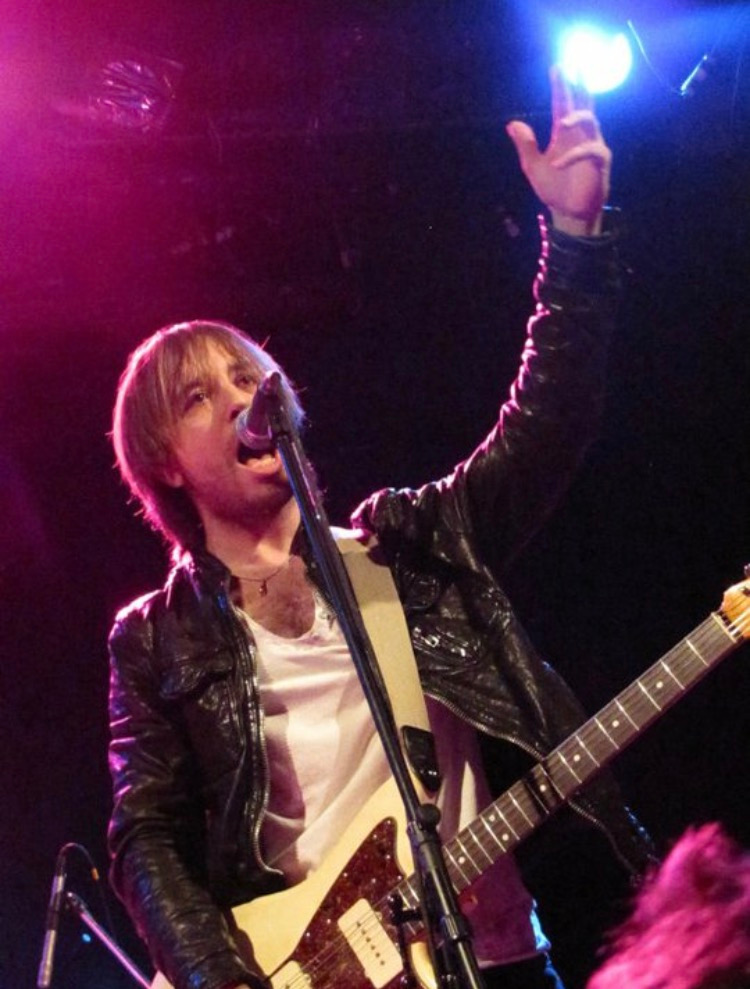
Rice live with Blackbells

After Surefire, Rice fronted the indie rock band: Blackbells, whose sound was compared to British artists: The Verve and Oasis. Rice produced two EPs with this group, and witnessed commercial success with musical features on CMJ College Radio, HBO TV, and the USA Network.

==== Blackbells EP ====
Rice produced the 2010 self-titled Blackbells EP. This album quickly climbed the charts to reach No. 18 on the CMJ College Radio chart.

During this time, Blackbells toured the United States and Canada and performed with artists Alberta Cross, Band of Skulls, The Crash Kings, The Greenhornes, J Mascis, and Marcy Playground. With the band, Rice made appearances at the 2010/2011 SXSW music festival, showcased at Brooklyn-Vegan's 2010 "CMJ Showcase" (a music festival), and played at the John Varvatos store in New York City.

==== IxI EP ====
Later in 2011, Rice also produced Blackbells sophomore release: IxI EP.

Like Blackbells first release, this EP was a commercial success with musical features in USA Network's Necessary Roughness television drama (episode #308) and in the premier season of HBO's 24/7 sports show (episodes #1–2). Blackbells songs "Bad Bones" and "Testify" were featured in theses HBO and USA Network TV shows. Later, Rice and his other Blackbells bandmates appeared at the DeLuna Music Festival.

Throughout the years with Blackbells and Surefire, Rice was often the front-man featured in news and entertainment media, including interviews with Quiksilver, a retail sporting company, and Last Call with Carson Daly – a late-night talk show. Rice established Degraw Sound, a recording studio, following Blackbells disbandment in 2011.

=== 2018–present: Solo career ===
As a solo artist, Rice has released three singles - "The Getaway", "Autumn Days", and "I Think We Got It Right" - to favorable reviews, drawing musical comparisons to Tom Petty, Ray LaMontagne, Bon Iver, and Iron & Wine.

In 2021, Rice released the full-length solo album Future Pretend.

== Professional work, notable collaborations, and select discography ==
=== Degraw Sound ===
Rice owns Degraw Sound – a recording studio in Brooklyn, NY.

According to an interview by Mix magazine, Rice credits the success of his business to hard-work, long-hours, and advice given by his former-producer and manager Gus van Go, who encouraged Rice to pursue a professional career in sound-production and studio-recording.

At Degraw Sound, Rice is known to produce unique compositions by collaborating with the artist, rather than directing their musical-style.

"Every artist and band is different. I don't come at anything from a ‘This is my production style’ approach. That only makes things boring, and even though it may save some time, it can actually sabotage a project," says Rice. "Because every project has its own quirks, you have to be willing to change accordingly and pick up on what the artist or band needs. Some will come into the studio with very specific ideas, and some will say they know what they want to make a record but don't know the extent of what they need in order to reach their goals. It's my job to get to know the client, figure out what's needed, and be willing to jump in and offer creative input to benefit the project."

— Ben Rice, Mix magazine (interview)

His professional credits include record production, engineering, and mixing sessions for a variety of artists – with a focus on indie rock, indie pop, and Americana. Some of his most notable work includes collaborations with artists The Candles (feat. Norah Jones), Aoife O'Donovan, The Districts, the Skins, Silya & The Sailors, Goldkey, Reckless Sons, and The Jezabels.

=== Degraw Fest ===
Rice founded Degraw Fest in 2017 - a music festival which features artists who record at his studio: Degraw Sound. The 2018 festival was featured in The New York Times - as a must-see event. Building on its prior success, the 2019 festival featured a series of performances at the Brooklyn Bridge Park (BBP) - hosted in partnership with the BBP Conservancy and Degraw Sound. Degraw Fest 2019 coincided with the park's 20th anniversary of hosting free programs. Over the years, Degraw Fest has featured artists including: AMFM, Bell the Band, Ben Rice, Common Jack, Eighty Ninety, Elliot and The Ghost, Fiama, Goldkey, GRITS, Kevin Daniel, Pearla, Queue, Sophie Colette, and Yella Belly.

=== Notable collaborations and appearances ===
After producing Reno Bo's album Happenings and Other Things (2009), Rice briefly toured with the Nashville-based rocker to promote the new record; this collaboration marked the first time that Rice produced an album, where he was not the primary artist.

Rice also produced, engineered, and mixed The Skins debut EP. Later, he engineered The Skins' single "Rude Girl", which was produced by Michael Einziger and Chad Hugo, as part of an album distributed by Republic Records. In 2014: Rice produced, engineered, and mixed the full-length album Unanchored' (Sony/RCA) for Norwegian artist: Silya & the Sailors. Silya's single, Sucka, charted at #1 on iTunes in Norway.

Later, Rice produced The Candles' 2016 Matter + Spirit album, which featured the guest vocals of singer/songwriter Norah Jones.

Rice played guitar and engineered on the Jonas Brothers 2019 Billboard #1 song “Like It’s Christmas”

In 2021 Rice received a nomination for Producer of the Year at the Americana Awards for his work on Valerie June’s album “The Moon and Stars: Prescriptions For Dreamers”, which was nominated for Album of the Year and reached #1 on the Americana Radio Airplay Albums Chart.

=== Select discography ===
Artist	Album	Credit	Label	Year
Valerie June	The Moon And Stars: Prescriptions For Dreamers	Producer, Engineer, (Mixer Deluxe Edition)	Concord/Fantasy	2021
Ben Platt	Reverie	Engineer, Guitar	Atlantic	2021
Jamie Miller	Here's Your Perfect	Engineer, Guitar	Atlantic	2021
Ben Rice	Future Pretend	Writer, Producer, Engineer, Mixer, Guitar, Bass, Mellotron, Programming		2021
Valerie June + Various Artists	Broken Hearts & Dirty Windows: Songs of John Prine Vol. 2	Engineer, Mixer	Oh Boy Records	2021
Jim Sclavunos	Holiday Song	Engineer, Mixer	Lowe Amusements	2021
Forever Honey	Pre-Mortem High	Producer, Engineer, Mixer		2020
Fletcher	Forever	Engineer, Guitar	Capitol Records	2020
Olivia Holt	Talk Me Out Of It	Engineer, Guitar	Hollywood Records	2020
Jonas Brothers	Like It's Christmas	Engineer, Guitar	Republic	2019
Valerie June	Little Wing	Engineer, Mixer	Fantasy/Concord	2019
Valerie June	Cosmic Dancer	Engineer, Mixer	Fantasy/Concord	2019
Kevin Daniel	Myself Through You	Writer, Producer, Engineer, Mixer	CEN	2018
GRITS.	Darlin’	Writer, Producer, Engineer, Mixer		2018
The Candles feat. Norah Jones	Move Along	Producer, Engineer, Mixer	The End	2016
The Candles	Matter + Spirit	Producer, Engineer, Mixer	The End	2016
Silya & The Sailors	Unanchored	Producer, Engineer, Mixer	Sony	2014
The Skins	The Skins EP	Producer, Engineer, Mixer		2012
Blackbells	IxI EP	Writer, Producer, Engineer, Mixer, Guitar, Vocals, Primary Artist		2011
Blackbells	Blackbells EP	Writer, Producer, Engineer, Mixer, Guitar, Vocals, Primary Artist		2010
Reno Bo	Happenings & Other Things	Producer, Engineer, Mixer, Guitar, Backing Vocals	Electric Western Records	2010
Surefire	Surefire	Writer, Producer, Engineer, Guitar, Vocals, Primary Artist	Newkirk Records	2009
Surefire	Love's On The Inside EP	Writer, Guitars, Vocals, Primary Artist	Lizard King Records	2006
Surefire + Various Artists	Help! A Day In The Life	Writer, Guitar, Vocals, Engineer, Primary Artist	Independiente	2005
