= Future Animals =

Danish musical group

- Origin: Copenhagen, Denmark
- Genres: R&B; soul
- Years active: 2011–2019
- Labels: Universal; Rocket Science
- Members: Stefan Forrest
- Past members: Morten Ristorp

Future Animals is a Danish group outfit comprising collaborating music producers Stefan Forrest ("Don Stefano") (songwriter/producer) and Morten Ristorp ("Rissi") (producer/songwriter). After break-up in 2019, Stefan Forrest continues to use the name in his solo releases.

== Career ==
They composed and produced songs for Lukas Graham's debut album, the self titled Lukas Graham, the follow-up Lukas Graham (Blue Album) and 3 (The Purple Album). They took part in writing hits for various artist like Aloe Blacc, Selena Gomez Hailee Steinfeld and Julia Michaels. They released their music through the label Rocket Science, a Universal Music Denmark imprint.

Their first single, "Ask For It", hit the Danish singles chart and earned acclaim for its music production. The follow-up "Crazy Love" charted on Hitlisten, the official Danish Singles Chart.

== Solo act after break-up ==
The duo broke up in 2019 and Stefan Forrest (a.k.a. Don Stefan) continues to use the name. He released the song "Last Summer" in 2019 credited to Future Animals.

== Discography ==
Year	Artist	Song	Video	Notes
2017	Future Animals	"Ask For It"		
2018	Future Animals	"Crazy Love"		Peaked at #30 in the Danish Hitlisten charts
2018	Future Animals (Stefan Forrest)	"Last Summer"		Stefan Forrest (solo) credited as Future Animals
