= Copenhagen Records =

- Parent company: Universal Music Group
- Founded: 5 January 2004
- Founder: Jakob Sørensen; Nick Foss; Mik Christensen; Christian Backman
- Genre: Various
- Country of origin: Denmark
- Location: Copenhagen
- Official website: copenhagenrecords.dk

Copenhagen Records is a Danish record label formed on 5 January 2004 by former EMI Recorded Music Denmark staff members to give artists more artistic autonomy. It houses artists spread over a wide range of genres, from rock to rap, and from pop artists to comedians.

In September 2011, Universal Music Group acquired Copenhagen Records, and the rest of MBO Group. The label operates as one of UMG's standalone labels.

== History ==
In 2003, EMI-Medley had a 40% share of the Danish music market. Days after Medley-founder Michael Ritto announced he would depart in February 2004, other senior staff members also left. Among them were former EMI Denmark head of A&R Nick Foss and former Capitol/Medley GM Mik Christensen, who had both worked at EMI for 19 years and long wanted to start a company of their own, but who had been persuaded by Ritto to hold off those plans. Former Medley marketing manager Jakob Sørensen and former A&R manager Christian Backman set up operations; Foss and Christensen joined on 1 April 2004. Christensen explained that Copenhagen Records had the aim "to recruit and develop quality Danish musicians. Sales of Danish artists have not dipped nearly as much as international acts [in Denmark]." The label also had the direct intention to create a strong local competitor against the established multinational labels.

In 2008, Christensen and Foss left Copenhagen Records and started Mermaid Records, which is largely owned by Sony Music Entertainment Denmark. After Sørensen and Backman left the company in 2013, the position of CEO was taken over by Torben Ravn, who was a product manager at Copenhagen Records since 2007.

Copenhagen Records is the market leader in Denmark on local repertoire and runs as a 360 label. Copenhagen Records also includes Copenhagen Music, a booking agency which primarily facilitates bookings for the artists on the label, and Copenhagen Publishing.

== Artists ==
- Agnes
- Alex Vargas
- Alexander Brown
- Alphabeat
- Apollo
- BOY
- Burhan G
- Caroline Henderson
- Carpark North
- Celina Ree
- De Eneste To (D.E.T.)
- Eivør
- Eric Gadd
- Hedegaard
- Fabian Mazur
- Freddy Wexler
- Jasmin
- Joey Moe
- Le Kid
- Lightwave Empire
- Lukas Graham
- Nephew
- Nexus Music
- Nik & Jay
- Noah
- Patrick Dorgan
- Rune Klan
- Saveus
- Selvmord
- Scarlet Pleasure
- Sebastian Øberg
- Spleen United
- Stine Bramsen
- Studio Killers
- Thanks
- Veronica Maggio
- Years & Years

== Former artists ==
- Cæcilie Nordby
- Flødeklinikken
- Hanne Boel
- Jinks
- Johnny Deluxe
- Laust Sonne
- Mads Langer
- Niarn
- Rock Hard Power Spray
- Sarah Hepburn
- Sanne Salomonsen
- Silja
- Siná
- Thomas Dybdahl
- Thomas Holm
- Tim Christensen
- Turboweekend
