= List of number-one hits of 2014 (Denmark) =

Tracklisten is a chart that ranks the best-performing singles and tracks of the Denmark. Its data, published by IFPI Denmark and compiled by Nielsen Music Control, is based collectively on each single's weekly digital sales.

== Chart history ==
Issue date	Song	Artist(s)	Ref.
3 January	"Sandstorm"	Rasmus Seebach	
10 January	"Timber"	Pitbull featuring Ke$ha	
17 January	"Marquis"	L.O.C.	
24 January	"Happy"	Pharrell Williams	
31 January	"Happy"	Pharrell Williams	
7 February	"Happy"	Pharrell Williams	
14 February	"Jalousi"	Medina	
21 February	"Jalousi"	Medina	
28 February	"Jalousi"	Medina	
7 March	"Happy"	Pharrell Williams	
14 March	"Happy"	Pharrell Williams	
21 March	"Happy Home"	Hedegaard	
28 March	"Happy Home"	Hedegaard	
4 April	"Do Ya"	Anthony Jasmin	
11 April	"Jalousi"	Medina	
18 April	"Happy Home"	Hedegaard	
25 April	"Happy Home"	Hedegaard	
2 May	"Happy Home"	Hedegaard	
9 May	"Love Never Felt So Good"	Michael Jackson featuring Justin Timberlake	
16 May	"Twerk It Like Miley"	Brandon Beal featuring Christopher	
23 May	"Rainmaker"	Emmelie de Forest	
30 May	"Million"	Joey Moe	
6 June	"Million"	Joey Moe	
13 June	"Million"	Joey Moe	
20 June	"Million"	Joey Moe	
27 June	"Karma"	Burhan G featuring L.O.C.	
4 July	"Mama Said"	Lukas Graham	
11 July	"Mama Said"	Lukas Graham	
18 July	"Mama Said"	Lukas Graham	
25 July	"Mama Said"	Lukas Graham	
2 August	"Mama Said"	Lukas Graham	
9 August	"Mama Said"	Lukas Graham	
16 August	"Prayer in C"	Lilly Wood and the Prick and Robin Schulz	
23 August	"Prayer in C"	Lilly Wood and the Prick and Robin Schulz	
30 August	"All About That Bass"	Meghan Trainor	
6 September	"Giv Slip"	Medina	
13 September	"Indianer"	Barbara Moleko	
20 September	"All About That Bass"	Meghan Trainor	
27 September	"All About That Bass"	Meghan Trainor	
4 October	"All About That Bass"	Meghan Trainor	
11 October	"Steal My Girl"	One Direction	
18 October	"I'm an Albatraoz"	AronChupa	
25 October	"All About That Bass"	Meghan Trainor	
1 November	"CPH Girls"	Christopher featuring Brandon Beal	
8 November	"Søvnløs"	KESI	
15 November	"Når intet er godt nok"	Medina	
22 November	"CPH Girls"	Christopher featuring Brandon Beal	
29 November	"CPH Girls"	Christopher featuring Brandon Beal	
6 December	"Thinking Out Loud"	Ed Sheeran	
13 December	"Cheerleader"	OMI	
20 December	"Cheerleader"	OMI	
27 December	"Cheerleader"	OMI	

== See also ==
- List of number-one albums from the 2010s (Denmark)
- 2014 in music
