= A Beautiful Real Life =

2025 documentary film

- Netflix promo
- Directed by: Nynne Duvaa Hall
- Starring: Christopher Lund Nissen; Cecilie Haugaard
- Distributed by: Netflix
- Release date: 27 August 2025 (Netflix)
- Running time: 131 minutes
- Country: Denmark
- Languages: English, Danish

A Beautiful Real Life is a 2025 Danish documentary film about the life of pop star Christopher Lund Nissen. It was released on 27 August 2025 by Netflix.

== Critical reception ==
Jose Solís from Common Sense Media rated the film 2/5 saying "It plays like a 90-minute promo reel designed to hype fans about his tour."

Alice Lange from Martin CID called it a "controlled, observational study" saying "Rather than building toward a sensational reveal, the film catalogues the mechanics of contemporary music work—rehearsals, studio refinement, media blocks, travel routines—and juxtaposes them with the ordinary tempo of home life."

Anjali Sharma from Midgard Times gave the film 7/10 and said "Christopher: A Beautiful Real Life is like a slow melody that builds into something quietly memorable. It's sincere, grounded, and avoids dramatising for effect."

== Soundtrack ==
A Beautiful Real Life

Soundtrack album by Christopher
- Released: 27 August 2025
- Labels: Parlophone, Warner

Christopher chronology
Fools Gold (2025)	A Beautiful Real Life (2025)

Singles from A Beautiful Real Life
- 1. "When We Were Young" Released: 27 August 2025

A soundtrack, compiling music from Christopher's four previous albums and three new tracks. It was released on 27 August 2025, .

=== Track listing ===
A Beautiful Real Life
No.	Title	Writer(s)	original album	Length
1.	"Orbit"	Nissen, Salem Al Fakir, Elias Kapari, Frederik Tao Nordsø, Fridolin Tai Nordsø, Vincent Pontare	Fools Gold	3:12
2.	"Leap of Faith"	Nissen, Alex Hauer, Thuy My Pham	My Blood	3:37
3.	"A Beautiful Life"	Nissen, Petter Tarland, Pär Westerlund	A Beautiful Life	3:38
4.	"When We Were Young"		new recording	2:55
5.	"Honey, I'm So High"	Nissen, Nordsø, Nordsø	A Beautiful Life	2:57
6.	"Trouble" (with Lee Young Ji)	Nissen, Lee Young Ji, Theis Andersen, Kapari, Gustav Wolter	Fools Gold	2:35
7.	"Stubborn Heart"		new recording	4:18
8.	"Fools Gold Pt.1"	Nissen, Kapari	Fools Gold	2:13
9.	"One"	Nissen, Al-Fakir, Kapari, Pontare	Fools Gold	2:59
10.	"Bad"	Nissen, Aron Blom, Lenno Linjama, Alexander Tidebrink	Under the Surface	3:11
11.	"Lose a You"	Nissan, Nathan Chapman	Fools Gold	3:09
12.	"Just Kiss Me"	Nissen, Jamie Scott	Under the Surface	3:27
13.	"Ready to Go"	Nissen, Daniel Schulz, Thomas Drachmann	A Beautiful Life	2:03
14.	"It Could Have Been Us" (featuring Griff)	Nissen, Sarah Griffiths, Kapari, Jeppe London, Celine Svanbäck	Fools Gold	2:50
15.	"Permanent Scars"	Nissen, London, Svanbäck	Fools Gold	3:35
16.	"Daddy Don't Go"		new recording	3:15
17.	"Evidence of Us" (featuring Svea)	Nissen, Christiansen, London	Fools Gold	3:22
18.	"Fools Gold Pt.2"	Nissen, Kapari, Kerstin Ljungström	Fools Gold	2:21

=== Weekly charts ===
Chart performance for A Beautiful Real Life
Chart (2025)	Peak position
Danish Albums (Hitlisten)	18
