= X Factor (Danish TV series) season 7 =

X Factor
- Season 7
- Hosted by: Eva Harlou
- Judges: Thomas Blachman; Lina Rafn; Remee
- Winner: Anthony Jasmin
- Winning mentor: Thomas Blachman
- Runner-up: Lucy Mardou
- Finals venue: DR Byen

Release
- Original network: DR1
- Original release: January 3 – March 28, 2014

Season chronology
- ← Previous; Season 6 Next → Season 8

X Factor is a Danish television music competition to find new singing talent. The seventh season premiered on January 3, 2014, on DR1 and ended on March 28. Eva Harlou replaced Signe Molde as host. Thomas Blachman returned for his sixth season as judge and was rejoined by Lina Rafn and Remee, reinstating the original judging panel from seasons 1 and 2. Rafn and Remee rejoined the judging panel as replacements for former judges, Ida Corr and Anne Linnet. Spin-off show Xtra Factor did not return.

== Judges and hosts ==
Season 7 judges

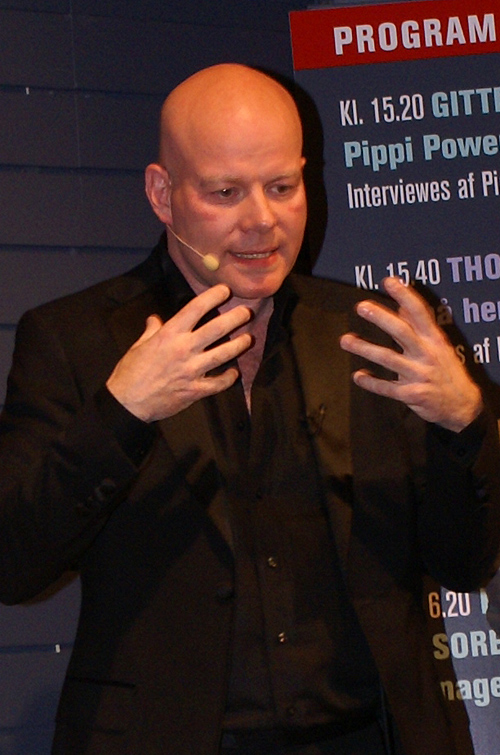
Thomas Blachman

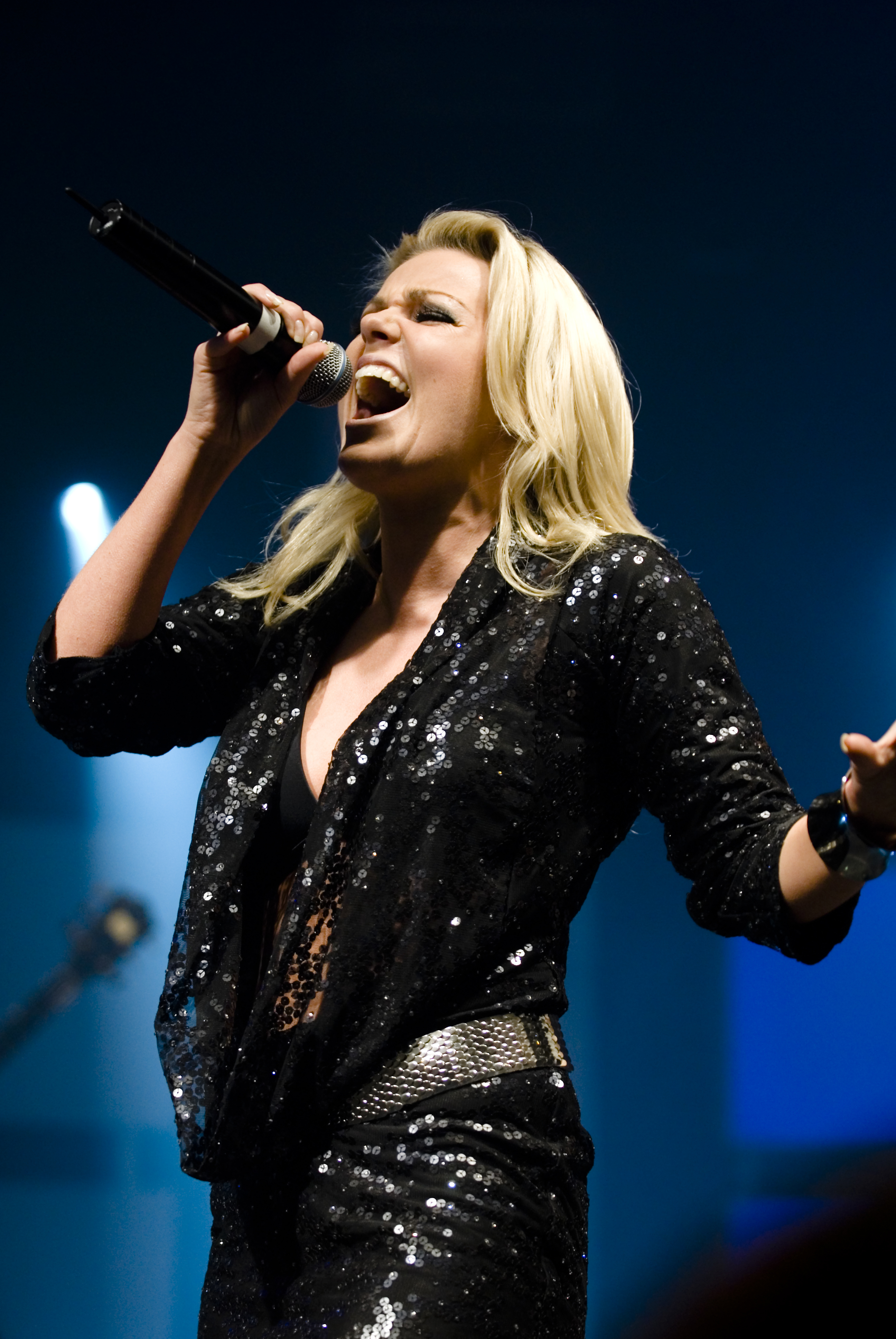
Lina Rafn

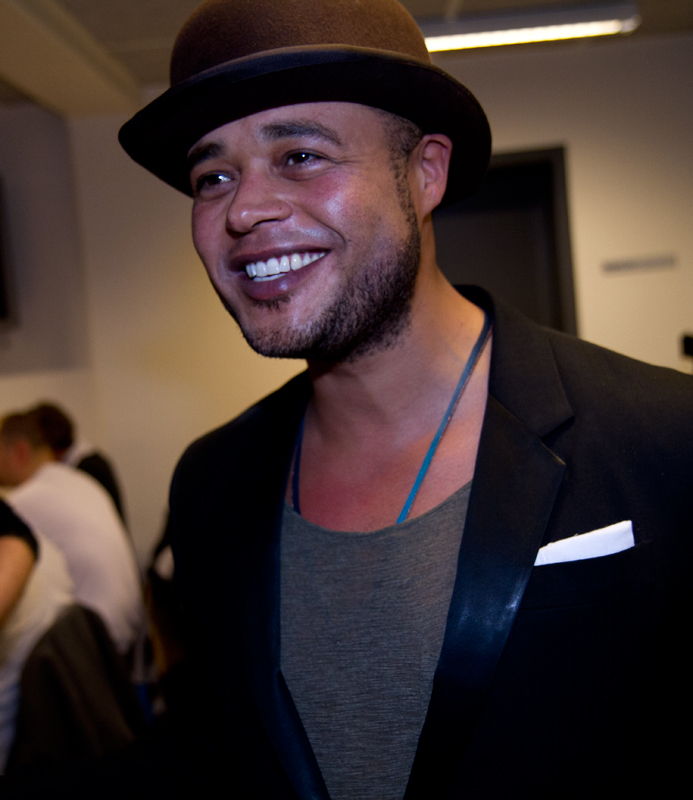
Remee

After the sixth live show of the sixth season on March 15, 2013, Ida Corr was asked if she would return as a judge for another season and said that she did not know. On 17 June, it was reported that former judge Remee, who appeared in the first three seasons, was in talks with DR1 to return as a judge for season 7. On August 16, it was announced that Eva Harlou would replace Signe Molde as host for the seventh season. On 17 September, judge Anne Linnet revealed that Lina Rafn, who appeared in the first two seasons, and Remee would be re-joining Thomas Blachman for season 7. The following day, the judging panel was officially confirmed as Blachman, Rafn and Remee.

== Selection process ==
=== Auditions ===
The live auditions were dropped and replaced by the room auditions last used in season 3. The auditions took place in Århus from September 24–26, 2013, and at DR Byen in Copenhagen from September 30 – October 2, 2013.

Judges' auditions
City	Dates	Venue
Århus	September 24–26, 2013	
Copenhagen	September 30 – October 2, 2013	DR Byen

=== Superbootcamp ===
Superbootcamp took place at Vega. The 15-23s and Over 24s categories were changed to 15-22s and Over 23s. Remee received the Over 23s category, Rafn received the 14-23s and Blachman received the Groups.

=== Bootcamp ===
Remee took the Over 23s to his home and was assisted by Chief 1; Rafn took the 15-23s to Kødbyen with Glamboy P and Jonas Worup; and Blachman took the Groups to Rundetårn, with assistance from Lennart Ginman and Carsten Dahl.

The 6 eliminated acts were:

- 14-22s: Dannie, Hadiel
- Over 23s: Chaimae, Tommy
- Groups: Anne Sophie & Ida, Ása & Carsten

== Contestants ==
Key:

– Winner
– Runner-up

Act	Age(s)	Hometown	Category (mentor)	Result
Anthony Jasmin	15-19	Høje Gladsaxe & Albertslund	Groups (Blachman)	Winner
Lucy Mardou	23	Thy-lejren	Over 23s (Remee)	Runner-up
Henriette Haubjerg	16	Brande	14-22s (Rafn)	3rd place
Pernille Nordtorp	27	Copenhagen	Over 23s (Remee)	4th place
ManBand	31-44	Vesterbro, Valby & Herlev	Groups (Blachman)	5th place
Steffen Gilmartin	50	Vesterbro	Over 23s (Remee)	6th place
Fie Winther	16	Helsingør	14-22s (Rafn)	7th place
Mathias Chrøis	17	Taastrup	14-22s (Rafn)	8th place
lickety-split	15-19	Aarhus & Hadsten	Groups (Blachman)	9th place

== Live shows ==
The live shows started on February 14, 2014, at DR Byen. The season 7 final was the first since season 2 to be held at DR Byen after being held in Parken from seasons 3-4 and Jyske Bank Boxen from seasons 5–6.

=== Results summary ===
Contestants' colour key:

– Remee's contestants (Over 23s)
– Rafn's contestants (14-22s)
– Blachman's contestants (Groups)

Contestant	Week 1	Week 2	Week 3	Week 4	Week 5	Week 6	Week 7	
Contestant	Week 1	Week 2	Week 3	Week 4	Week 5	Week 6	1st round	2nd round
Anthony Jasmin	6th 9.13%	5th 10.42%	1st 22.65%	1st 21.81%	2nd 21.71%	2nd 26.93%	2nd 37.46%	Winner; 54.40%
Lucy Mardou	1st 24.02%	1st 26.90%	2nd 20.01%	3rd 17.60%	1st 25.68%	1st 33.23%	1st 38.51%	Runner-Up; 45.60%
Henriette Haubjerg	4th 12.59%	4th 11.04%	6th 10.24%	2nd 20.22%	5th 17.01%	3rd 20.45%	3rd 24.03%	Eliminated (Week 7)
Pernille Nordtorp	9th 4.68%	2nd 15.04%	4th 11.85%	5th 14.69%	3rd 18.06%	4th 19.39%	Eliminated (Week 6)	
ManBand	2nd 14.29%	3rd 14.26%	3rd 17.85%	4th 15.90%	4th 17.53%	Eliminated (Week 5)		
Steffen Gilmartin	3rd 13.64%	6th 8.82%	5th 10.42%	6th 9.79%	Eliminated (Week 4)			
Fie Winther	5th 9.49%	8th 6.58%	7th 6.97%	Eliminated (Week 3)				
Mathias Chrøis	7th 7.46%	7th 6.94%	Eliminated (Week 2)					
lickety-split	8th 4.71%	Eliminated (Week 1)						
Fewest votes	lickety-split, Pernille Nordtorp	Fie Winther, Mathias Chrøis	Fie Winther, Henriette Haubjerg	Pernille Nordtorp, Steffen Gilmartin	Henriette Haubjerg, ManBand	The act that received the fewest public votes was automatically eliminated.		
Remee voted to eliminate	lickety-split	Fie Winther	Fie Winther	Steffen Gilmartin	ManBand	The act that received the fewest public votes was automatically eliminated.		
Rafn voted to eliminate	lickety-split	Mathias Chrøis	Fie Winther	Pernille Nordtorp	ManBand	The act that received the fewest public votes was automatically eliminated.		
Blachman voted to eliminate	Pernille Nordtorp	Mathias Chrøis	Henriette Haubjerg	Steffen Gilmartin	Henriette Haubjerg	The act that received the fewest public votes was automatically eliminated.		
Eliminated	lickety-split 9th	Mathias Chrøis; 8th	Fie Winther; 7th	Steffen Gilmartin; 6th	ManBand; 5th	Pernille Nordtorp; 4th	Henriette Haubjerg; 3rd	Lucy Mardou; Runner-Up
Eliminated	lickety-split 9th	Mathias Chrøis; 8th	Fie Winther; 7th	Steffen Gilmartin; 6th	ManBand; 5th	Pernille Nordtorp; 4th	Henriette Haubjerg; 3rd	Anthony Jasmin; Winner

=== Live show details ===
==== Week 1 (February 14) ====
- Theme: Signature

Contestants' performances on the first live show
Act	Order	Song	Result
Pernille Nordtorp	1	"Blue Jeans"	Bottom two
lickety-split	2	"La La La"	Eliminated
Mathias Chrøis	3	"Sig det"	Safe
ManBand	4	"Do You Realize??"	Safe
Fie Winther	5	"Nightcall"	Safe
Lucy Mardou	6	"Colors"	Safe (Highest votes)
Anthony Jasmin	7	"Brother Where Are You"	Safe
Steffen Gilmartin	8	"Fred"	Safe
Henriette Haubjerg	9	"Running to the Sea"	Safe

Judges' votes to eliminate

- Blachman: Pernille Nordtorp
- Remee: lickety-split
- Rafn: lickety-split

==== Week 2 (February 21) ====
- Theme: Danish hits
- Musical guest: Shaka Loveless ("Dengang du græd" og "2 mod verden")

Contestants' performances on the second live show
Act	Order	Song	Result
Fie Winther	1	"Landet"	Bottom two
Steffen Gilmartin	2	"Pandora"	Safe
Anthony Jasmin	3	"Hos mig igen"	Safe
Mathias Chrøis	4	"Veninder"	Eliminated
Pernille Nordtorp	5	"Ridset i panden"	Safe
Henriette Haubjerg	6	"Du og jeg"	Safe
ManBand	7	"Snehvidekys"	Safe
Lucy Mardou	8	"Kringsat af fjender"	Safe (Highest votes)

Judges' votes to eliminate

- Blachman: Mathias Chrøis
- Remee: Fie Winther
- Rafn: Mathias Chrøis

==== Week 3 (February 28) ====
- Theme: Top 40 Hits

Contestants' performances on the third live show
Act	Order	Song	Result
Steffen Gilmartin	1	"Ho Hey"	Safe
Henriette Haubjerg	2	"Wrecking Ball"	Bottom two
ManBand	3	"Hey Brother"	Safe
Lucy Mardou	4	"Somewhere Only We Know"	Safe
Fie Winther	5	"Burn"	Eliminated
Pernille Nordtorp	6	"Holy Grail"	Safe
Anthony Jasmin	7	"Happy"	Safe (Highest votes)

Judges' votes to eliminate

- Blachman: Henriette Haubjerg
- Remee: Fie Winther
- Rafn: Fie Winther

==== Week 4 (March 7) ====
- Theme: Eurovision hits

Contestants' performances on the fourth live show
Act	Order	Song	Result
Lucy Mardou	1	"Nocturne"/"Satellite"	Safe
Steffen Gilmartin	2	"What's Another Year"	Eliminated
Henriette Haubjerg	3	"Danse i måneskin"	Safe
Anthony Jasmin	4	"To lys på et bord"	Safe (Highest votes)
Pernille Nordtorp	5	"Divine"	Bottom two
ManBand	6	"Save Your Kisses for Me"	Safe

Judges' votes to eliminate

- Rafn: Pernille Nordtorp
- Blachman: Steffen Gilmartin
- Remee: Steffen Gilmartin

==== Week 5 (March 14) ====
- Theme: British beats
- Musical guest: John Newman ("Losing Sleep")
- Group performance: John Newman & The Top 5: ("Love Me Again")

Contestants' performances on the fifth live show
Act	Order	Song	Result
ManBand	1	"Don't Talk Just Kiss"	Eliminated
Henriette Haubjerg	2	"Wonderful Life"	Bottom two
Lucy Mardou	3	"Bohemian Rhapsody"/"Black Skinhead"/"London Calling"/"Eleanor Rigby"/"Chase the Devil"	Safe (Highest votes)
Anthony Jasmin	4	"Latch"	Safe
Pernille Nordtorp	5	"Smooth Operator"	Safe

Judges' votes to eliminate

- Rafn: ManBand
- Blachman: Henriette Haubjerg
- Remee: ManBand

==== Week 6: Semi-final (March 21) ====
- Theme: Songs from the contestants birth years; winner song
- Musical guest: Chresten ("Hanging My Youth Out")

Contestants' performances on the sixth live show
Act	Order	First song	Order	Second song	Result
Henriette Haubjerg	1	"Free"	5	"I Follow Rivers"	Safe
Pernille Nordtorp	2	"Take My Breath Away"	6	"Habits"	Eliminated
Lucy Mardou	3	"Dub Be Good to Me"	7	"Soon We'll Be Found"	Safe (Highest votes)
Anthony Jasmin	4	"Broken Homes"	8	"Hey Love"	Safe

The semi-final did not feature a final showdown and instead the act with the fewest public votes, Pernille Nordtorp, was automatically eliminated.

==== Week 7 (28 March): Final ====
- Theme: Free choice; duet with guest artists; winner's single
- Group performances: "All Night" (all contestants) and "You're the Voice" (auditionees)
- Musical guests: Carpark North ("Renegade"), Medina ("Jalousi"), Christopher ("Crazy"), Quadron ("Favorite Star") and Kim Cesarion ("I Love This Life")

Contestants' performances on the seventh live show
Act	Order	First song	Order	Duet	Order	Winner's single	Result
Lucy Mardou	1	"Team"	4	"32" (with Carpark North)	8	"The Switch"	Runner-up
Anthony Jasmin	2	"Time to Pretend"	5	"Told You So" (with Christopher)	7	"Do Ya"	Winner
Henriette Haubjerg	3	"Tomorrow"	6	"Kun for mig" (with Medina)		N/A	3rd Place
