= List of number-one hits of 2016 (Denmark) =

Tracklisten is a chart that ranks the best-performing singles and tracks of the Denmark. Its data, published by IFPI Denmark and compiled by Nielsen Music Control, is based collectively on each single's weekly digital sales.

== Chart history ==
Week	Issue date	Song	Artist(s)	Ref.
53	6 January	"Love Yourself"	Justin Bieber	
1	13 January	"Love Yourself"	Justin Bieber	
2	20 January	"Love Yourself"	Justin Bieber	
3	27 January	"Tidligt Op"	Gilli featuring Branco	
4	3 February	"Tidligt Op"	Gilli featuring Branco	
5	10 February	"Tidligt Op"	Gilli featuring Branco	
6	17 February	"Tidligt Op"	Gilli featuring Branco	
7	24 February	"Golden"	Brandon Beal featuring Lukas Graham	
8	2 March	"Work"	Rihanna featuring Drake	
9	9 March	"Work"	Rihanna featuring Drake	
10	16 March	"Golden"	Brandon Beal featuring Lukas Graham	
11	23 March	"Golden"	Brandon Beal featuring Lukas Graham	
12	30 March	"Bomaye"	Sleiman featuring Livid and MellemFingaMuzik	
13	6 April	"Bomaye"	Sleiman featuring Livid and MellemFingaMuzik	
14	13 April	"Bomaye"	Sleiman featuring Livid and MellemFingaMuzik	
15	20 April	"I Won't Let You Down"	Christopher featuring Bekuh BOOM	
16	27 April	"I Won't Let You Down"	Christopher featuring Bekuh BOOM	
17	4 May	"Nede Mette"	Blak	
18	11 May	"Nede Mette"	Blak	
19	18 May	"Nede Mette"	Blak	
20	25 May	"Nede Mette"	Blak	
21	1 June	"Nede Mette"	Blak	
22	8 June	"Nede Mette"	Blak	
23	15 June	"Nede Mette"	Blak	
24	22 June	"Nede Mette"	Blak	
25	29 June	"Nede Mette"	Blak	
26	6 July	"Model"	Gulddreng	
27	13 July	"Model"	Gulddreng	
28	20 July	"Model"	Gulddreng	
29	27 July	"Model"	Gulddreng	
30	3 August	"Se Mig Nu"	Gulddreng	
31	10 August	"Se Mig Nu"	Gulddreng	
32	17 August	"Se Mig Nu"	Gulddreng	
33	24 August	"Se Mig Nu"	Gulddreng	
34	31 August	"Se Mig Nu"	Gulddreng	
35	7 September	"Hva' Så"	Gulddreng	
36	14 September	"Hva' Så"	Gulddreng	
37	21 September	"Closer"	The Chainsmokers featuring Halsey	
38	28 September	"Closer"	The Chainsmokers featuring Halsey	
39	5 October	"Closer"	The Chainsmokers featuring Halsey	
40	12 October	"Closer"	The Chainsmokers featuring Halsey	
41	19 October	"Starboy"	The Weeknd featuring Daft Punk	
42	26 October	"Starboy"	The Weeknd featuring Daft Punk	
43	2 November	"Drikker for lidt"	Gulddreng	
44	9 November	"Drikker for lidt"	Gulddreng	
45	16 November	"Starboy"	The Weeknd featuring Daft Punk	
46	23 November	"Starboy"	The Weeknd featuring Daft Punk	
47	30 November	"Nemt"	Gulddreng	
48	7 December	"Guld jul"	Gulddreng	
49	14 December	"Guld jul"	Gulddreng	
50	21 December	"Guld jul"	Gulddreng	
51	28 December	"Ked af det"	Gulddreng	
52	4 January 2017	"Guld jul"	Gulddreng	
