= I Won't Let You Down (Christopher song) =

2016 single by Danish singer Christopher

Single by Christopher featuring Bekuh Boom

from the album Closer
- Released: April 2016
- Length: 3:40
- Label: EMI Denmark
- Songwriters: CChristopher Lund Nissen, Brandon Beal, Rebecca Johnson, Henrik Wolsing
- Producer: Hennedub

Christopher singles chronology
"Limousine" (2016)	"I Won't Let You Down" (2016)	"Take Me Back" (2016)

"I Won't Let You Down" is a song by Danish singer Christopher featuring American singer Bekuh Boom. The single was released in April 2016 as the third single from his third studio album, Closer. The song topped Tracklisten, the official Danish Singles Chart, becoming Christopher's third number one on the chart after "Twerk It Like Miley" and "CPH Girls".

== Track listing ==
digital download

1. "I Won't Let You Down" - 3:40

== Charts ==
=== Weekly charts ===
Chart (2016)	Peak position
Denmark (Tracklisten)	1

=== Year-end charts ===
Chart (2016)	Position
Denmark (Tracklisten)	36

== Certifications ==
Region	Certification	Certified units/sales
Denmark (IFPI Danmark)	2× Platinum	180,000^{‡}
^{‡} Sales+streaming figures based on certification alone.

== See also ==
- List of number-one hits of 2016 (Denmark)
