= Next Star =

Next Star may refer to:

== Music competition series ==
- Next Star (Romanian TV series), a Romanian youth musical reality competition television series that debuted in 2013
- Next Star (Swedish TV series), a 2008–2010 Swedish youth musical reality competition television series
- Next Persian Star, an Iranian television show that aired on TV Persia
- The Next Star, a 2008–2014 Canadian youth musical reality competition television series that aired on YTV
- HaKokhav HaBa or The Next Star (Israel), an Israeli interactive reality singing competition, broadcast on Israeli Channel 2
- Are You The Next Big Star?, reality music competition by GMA New Media, Inc.

== Sports competition series ==
- Football's Next Star, a 2010 British reality competition television series that aired on Sky 1
- Football's Next Star (Irish TV series), a 2012 Irish reality competition television series that aired on RTÉ Two
- Skating's Next Star, a 2006 American reality competition television series that aired on WE tv

== Others ==
- Next Action Star, a 2004 American reality television program
- Next Star, a player development initiative of Australia's National Basketball League

== See also ==
- Nexstar Media Group
- NexStar, a lines of telescopes from Celestron
