= Told You So (Christopher album) =

Studio album by Christopher
- Released: March 2014
- Recorded: 2013–14
- Genre: Pop
- Label: Parlophone

Christopher chronology
Colours (2012)	Told You So (2014)	Closer (2016)

Singles from Told You So
- 1. "Told You So" Released: September 2013; 2. "Crazy" Released: January 2014; 3. "Mama" Released: March 2014; 4. "Waterfall" Released: April 2014

Singles from Told You So (Deluxe)
- 1. "CPH Girls" Released: October 2014

Told You So is the second studio album by the Danish singer Christopher, released by Parlophone Denmark in March 2014. The album peaked at number 2 on the Danish Albums Chart. Four singles were released from the album: "Told You So", "Crazy", "Mama" and "Waterfall".

A deluxe edition of the album was released in November 2014.

== Track listing ==
Told You So track listing
No.	Title	Writer(s)	Length
1.	"Told You So"	Christopher Nissen, Brandon Beal, Frederik Nordsø, Fridolin Nordsø	3:30
2.	"Crazy"	Nissen, Beal, Fridolin Nordsø, Mads Reinholdt, Fredrik Tao	3:20
3.	"Doctor"	Nissen, Beal, Fridolin Nordsø, Tao	3:17
4.	"Remind You"	Nissen, Fridolin Nordsø, Tao	4:31
5.	"Nympho"	Nissen, Beal, Frederik Nordsø, Fridolin Nordsø, Tao	3:48
6.	"Go Find a Man"	Nissen, Julia Jakobsen, Fridolin Nordsø, Tao	3:29
7.	"Mama"	Nissen, Beal, Fridolin Nordsø, Tao	3:23
8.	"High On Life"	Nissen, Beal, Fridolin Nordsø, Tao	3:27
9.	"Little Sunshine"	Nissen, Fridolin Nordsø, Tao	3:36
10.	"Waterfall"	Nissen, Jakobsen, Fridolin Nordsø, Tao	3:08
11.	"We Should Be" (bonus track)	Nissen, Beal	3:26

Told You So (Deluxe) track listing
No.	Title	Writer(s)	Length
1.	"Told You So"		3:30
2.	"CPH Girls" (featuring Brandon Beal)	Christopher Lund Nissen, Brandon Beal, Frederik Nordsø, Fridolin Nordsø, Grace Tither	3:31
3.	"Crazy"		3:20
4.	"Doctor"		3:17
5.	"Remind You"		4:31
6.	"Nympho"		3:48
7.	"Go Find a Man"		3:29
8.	"Mama"		3:23
9.	"High On Life"		3:27
10.	"Little Sunshine"		3:36
11.	"Waterfall"		3:08
12.	"We Should Be"		3:26
13.	"First Like" (live)	Nissen, Theis Andersen	3:40
14.	"Twerk It Like Miley" (featuring Brandon Beal)	Nissen, Beal, Rasmus Hedegaard	3:21

== Charts ==
=== Weekly charts ===
Weekly chart performance for Told You So
Chart (2014–15)	Peak position
Danish Albums (Hitlisten)	2

=== Year-end charts ===
Year-end chart performance for Told You So
Chart (2014)	Position
Danish Albums (Hitlisten)	8
Chart (2015)	Position
Danish Albums (Hitlisten)	34

== Certifications ==
Region	Certification	Certified units/sales
Denmark (IFPI Danmark)	2× Platinum	40,000^{‡}
^{‡} Sales+streaming figures based on certification alone.
