= Told =

Told may refer to:

- Told (village), in eastern Hungary
- Shane Told (born 1981), Canadian musician
- "Told", song from the album Quality Time
- "Told", song from the mixtape, Gang
- "Told", episode of the TV series Band of Gold

== See also ==
- Tolled (disambiguation)
- I Told You So (disambiguation)
- Truth Be Told (disambiguation)
