= Closer (Christopher album) =

Studio album by Christopher
- Released: 15 April 2016
- Recorded: 2015–16
- Label: Parlophone

Christopher chronology
Told You So (2014)	Closer (2016)	Under the Surface (2019)

Singles from Closer
- 1. "Tulips" Released: 7 August 2015; 2. "Limousine" Released: 29 January 2016; 3. "I Won't Let You Down" Released: 1 April 2016; 4. "Heartbeat" Released: 16 September 2016

Singles from Closer (2017 version)
- 1. "Free Fall" Released: 30 December 2016; 2. "Naked" Released: March 2017

Closer is the third studio album by Danish singer Christopher. It was released on 15 April 2016, by Parlophone Records. The album was preceded by the singles "Tulips", "Limousine" featuring Madcon and "I Won't Let You Down" featuring Bekuh Boom, which was released on 1 April 2016.

The album was re-released in May 2017 with six extra tracks.

== Title and music ==
According to Christopher, the album is titled Closer because he has made a record that represents the place he wants to go with his music. He also considers it his most honest and personal album to date. Christopher also emphasized that with the album there is a close connection between himself and listeners, as well as an opportunity for listeners to understand the personal development he has undergone through the last three years.

== Production ==
Many of the songs began as ideas Christopher played on acoustic guitar in his living room. Others are the result of work in Denmark, Sweden and the United States. Christopher intended to musically challenge himself by collaborating with various producers and songwriters. "Limousine" was written with songwriter Clarence Coffee Jr., who has previously worked with Rihanna and Maroon 5.

Christopher also collaborated with some of his core musical friends; Brandon Beal is again involved. The pair previously collaborated on single "Twerk It Like Miley", which has reached 100 million views on YouTube. Closer features Beal on "Don't Let the Door Hit Ya".

== Track listing ==
Closer track listing
No.	Title	Length
1.	"Tulips"	3:26
2.	"Limousine" (featuring Madcon)	3:34
3.	"I Won't Let You Down" (featuring Bekuh Boom)	3:40
4.	"Famous"	2:50
5.	"Bitter War" (featuring Ericka Jane)	3:15
6.	"Don't Let the Door Hit Ya" (featuring Brandon Beal)	4:06
7.	"Reasons"	3:41
8.	"Hungover"	3:49
9.	"Baby Making (Interlude)"	2:27
10.	"First Time"	3:36
11.	"All About Sex"	3:32
12.	"Heartbeat"	3:20

Closer (2017 version)
No.	Title	Length
1.	"Naked"	3:07
2.	"I Won't Let You Down" (featuring Bekuh Boom)	3:40
3.	"Tulips"	3:26
4.	"Limousine" (featuring Madcon)	3:34
5.	"Take Me Back" (with Matoma)	2:58
6.	"Free Fall"	3:10
7.	"Famous"	2:50
8.	"Bitter War" (featuring Ericka Jane)	3:15
9.	"Don't Let the Door Hit Ya" (featuring Brandon Beal)	4:06
10.	"Reasons"	3:41
11.	"Hungover"	3:49
12.	"Baby Making (Interlude)"	2:27
13.	"First Time"	3:36
14.	"All About Sex"	3:32
15.	"Heartbeat"	3:20
16.	"Heartbeat" (acoustic)	3:31
17.	"Free Fall" (unplugged)	2:46
18.	"Naked" (unplugged)	3:01

== Charts ==
=== Weekly charts ===
Weekly chart performance for Closer
Chart (2016)	Peak position
Danish Albums (Hitlisten)	1

=== Year-end charts ===
Year-end chart performance for Closer
Chart (2016)	Position
Danish Albums (Hitlisten)	29

== Certifications ==
Region	Certification	Certified units/sales
Denmark (IFPI Danmark)	Platinum	20,000^{‡}
^{‡} Sales+streaming figures based on certification alone.
