= Fools Gold (Christopher album) =

Studio album by Christopher
- Released: 2 May 2025
- Labels: Christopher, Warner Music Denmark

Christopher chronology
A Beautiful Life (2023)	Fools Gold (2025)	A Beautiful Real Life (2025)

Singles from Fools Gold
- 1. "One" Released: 26 April 2024; 2. "It Could Have Been Us" Released: 23 August 2024; 3. "Trouble" Released: 20 September 2024; 4. "Lose a You" Released: 16 January 2025; 5. "Permanent Scars" Released: 9 March 2025; 6. "Orbit" Released: 2 May 2025

Fools Gold is the sixth studio album by Danish singer Christopher. The album was announced in February 2025. It was released on 2 May 2025 and peaked at number 6 on the Danish charts. It was certified gold in Denmark in July 2026.

== Track listing ==
Fools Gold track listing
No.	Title	Writer(s)	Length
1.	"Fools Gold Pt. I"	Christopher Nissen, Elias Kapari	2:13
2.	"One"	Nissen, Salem Al-Fakir, Kapari, Vincent Pontare	2:59
3.	"It Could Have Been Us" (featuring Griff)	Nissen, Sarah Griffiths, Kapari, Jeppe London, Celine Svanbäck	2:50
4.	"Lose a You"	Nissen, Nathan Chapman	3:09
5.	"Orbit"	Nissen, Al Fakir, Kapari, Frederik Tao Nordsø, Fridolin Tai Nordsø, Pontare	3:12
6.	"Fields of Marigold"	Nissen, Svanbäck, London	3:01
7.	"Trouble" (with Lee Young Ji)	Nissen, Lee Young Ji, Theis Andersen, Kapari, Gustav Wolter	2:35
8.	"Evidence of Us" (featuring Svea)	Nissen, Christiansen, London	3:22
9.	"Madness of Two"	Nissen, Kapari, Daniel Ledinsky	2:31
10.	"Permanent Scars"	Nissen, London, Svanbäck	3:35
11.	"Fools Gold Pt. II"	Nissen, Kapari, Kerstin Ljungström	2:21
12.	"Be Home Soon (Alberte's Song)"	Nissen, Christiansen, Haugaard, Kapari, London	2:12

== Charts ==
Chart performance for Fools Gold
Chart (2025)	Peak position
Danish Albums (Hitlisten)	6

== Certifications ==
Region	Certification	Certified units/sales
Denmark (IFPI Danmark)	Gold	10,000^{‡}
^{‡} Sales+streaming figures based on certification alone.
