= Nothing in Common (disambiguation) =

Nothing in Common is a 1986 comedy-drama film by Garry Marshall.

Nothing in Common may also refer to:

- Nothing in Common (TV series), a TV series based on the film
- "Nothing in Common" (Christopher song) (2012)
- "Nothing in Common" (Thompson Twins song), a 1986 song from the film
- "Nothing in Common", a song by H-Town from Imitations of Life

== See also ==
- "Nothing in Common But Love", a song by Twister Alley from Twister Alley
