= Told You So =

Told You So may refer to:

- Told You So (Sparkle album), 2000 album by singer Sparkle
- Told You So (Christopher album), 2014 album by Danish singer Christopher
  - "Told You So" (Christopher song), title track from album above by Danish singer Christopher
- "Told You So" (Miguel song), from his 2017 album War & Leisure
- "Told You So" (Paramore song), from their 2017 album After Laughter
- "Told You So" (Nathan Evans song), 2021 song by Scottish singer Nathan Evans
- "Told You So" (Martin Garrix and Jex song), 2024 song by Dutch DJ Martin Garrix and American singer Jex
- "Told You So", Joe Walsh song featuring Don Felder, from his 1983 album You Bought It – You Name It
- "Told You So", Colette Carr song featuring Porcelain Black from Colette Carr 2013 album Skitszo
- "Told You So", Depeche Mode song, from their 1983 album Construction Time Again
- "Told You So", Drowning Pool song from their 2001 album Sinner
- "Told You So", T.I. song from their 2006 album King
- "Told You So", Little Mix song from their 2018 album LM5
