= Do Ya =

Do Ya may refer to:

- Do Ya (album), by the Screaming Jets, or the title song, 2008
- "Do Ya" (Anthony Jasmin song), 2014
- "Do Ya" (The Move song), 1972; covered by Electric Light Orchestra, 1976
- "Do Ya" / "Stay with Me", a single by McFly, 2008
- "Do Ya'", a song by K. T. Oslin, 1987
- "Do Ya", a song by Barney Bentall and the Legendary Hearts, 1995
- "Do Ya", a song by Inner City, 1994
- "Do Ya", a song by Jump5 from Accelerate, 2003
- "Do Ya?", a song by Nick Mason from Nick Mason's Fictitious Sports, 1981
- "Do Ya", a song by Peaches from Impeach My Bush, 2006

== See also ==
- Do You (disambiguation)
