= Do You =

Do You may refer to:

- Do You (album), an album by Sheena Easton
- "Do You..." (Miguel song), a song by Miguel
- "Do You (Bro'Sis song), a song by Bro'Sis
- "Do You" (Ne-Yo song), a song by Ne-Yo
- "Do You", a song by Jay Sean from All or Nothing
- "Do You", a song by Spoon from They Want My Soul
- "Do You?", a song by Rebecca Black
- "Do You?", a song by Naaz
- Do You!: 12 Laws to Access the Power in You to Achieve Happiness and Success, (2007) a book by Russell Simmons and Chris Morrow

== See also ==
- Do Ya (disambiguation)
