= CPH Girls =

2014 single by Danish singer Christopher

Single by Christopher featuring Brandon Beal

from the album Told You So (Deluxe)
- Released: October 2014
- Length: 3:31
- Label: Parlophone, Warner Music Denmark
- Songwriters: Christopher Lund Nissen, Brandon Beal, Frederik Nordsø, Fridolin Nordsø, Grace Tither

Christopher singles chronology
"Twerk It Like Miley" (2014)	"CPH Girls" (2014)	"Tulips" (2015)

"CPH Girls" is a song by Danish singer Christopher featuring American singer Brandon Beal. The single was released in October 2014 lifted from the deluxe edition Christopher's second studio album, Told You So. The song topped Tracklisten, the official Danish Singles Chart, becoming Christopher and Beal's second collaborative number one on the chart after "Twerk It Like Miley" released in May 2014.

== Reception ==
Scandipop said "It's an urban jam with a great deal of sax. Down-tempo and beat driven, but we still get to hear Christopher let rip vocally."

== Track listings ==
digital download/ streaming

1. "CPH Girls" - 3:31

digital download/ streaming

1. "CPH Girls" (Hedegaard remix) - 4:45

digital download/ streaming

1. "CPH Girls" (Kongstead remix) - 5:03

== Charts ==
=== Weekly charts ===
Chart (2014)	Peak position
Denmark (Tracklisten)	1

=== Year-end charts ===
Chart (2014)	Position
Denmark (Tracklisten)	44
Chart (2015)	Position
Denmark (Tracklisten)	73

== Certifications ==
Region	Certification	Certified units/sales
Denmark (IFPI Danmark)	2× Platinum	180,000^{‡}
^{‡} Sales+streaming figures based on certification alone.

== See also ==
- List of number-one hits of 2014 (Denmark)
