= Anthony Jasmin =

Danish pop duo

- Origin: Denmark
- Genres: Pop
- Years active: 2014
- Members: Anthony Lopez; Jasmin Dahl

Anthony Jasmin sometimes Anthony & Jasmin is a Danish pop duo who on 28 March 2014 won season 7 of the Danish version of X Factor in 2014. After Anthony Lopez and Jasmin Dahl were eliminated as solo artists at bootcamp, the duo was formed and mentored by Thomas Blachman. They reached the final and won against Lucy, mentored by Remee, becoming the first ever duo or group formation to win the Danish title.

Their debut single "Do Ya" topped Tracklisten, the official Danish Singles Chart immediately following their win. They were the first duo or group formation that won the Danish title. In June 2014, the duo released their EP Stick Together through Sony with tracks including the winning song "Do Ya" and the new title track single "Stick Together".

One of the duo, Anthony, competed in the Dansk Melodi Grand Prix 2017 with the song "Smoke In My Eyes," but did not advance to the superfinal.

== Members ==
Anthony Jasmin is a duo named after the first names of its members. They are:

- Anthony Lopez, from Valby, 19 at time of application, student at CPH West school. Before X Factor, he had appeared with several smaller groups and released materials online through his YouTube channel.
- Jasmin Dahl, from Høje Gladsaxe, 15 at time of application, student, mixed Faroe Islands / Sudanese origin

== Performances during X Factor ==
| Episode | Theme | Song | Artist | Result |
|---|---|---|---|---|
| Live show 1 | Signature | "Brother Where Are You" | Oscar Brown Jr. | Safe (6th) |
| Live show 2 | Danish Hits | "Hos Mig Igen" | Xander | Safe (5th) |
| Live show 3 | Top 40 Hits | "Happy" | Pharrell Williams | Safe (1st) |
| Live show 4 | Eurovision Hits | "To Lys På Et Bord" | Otto Brandenburg | Safe (1st) |
| Live show 5 | British Beats | Latch | Disclosure featuring Sam Smith | Safe (2nd) |
| Live show 6 - Semi-final | Songs from the contestants birth years | "Broken Homes" | Tricky featuring PJ Harvey | Safe (2nd) |
| Live show 6 - Semi-final | winner song | "Hey Love" | Quadron | Safe (2nd) |
| Live show 7 - Final | Free choice | "Time to Pretend" | MGMT | Safe (2nd) |
| Live show 7 - Final | Duet with guest artist | "Told You So" with Christopher | Christopher | Safe (2nd) |
| Live show 7 - Final | Winner's single | "Do Ya" | Anthony Jasmin | Winners |

== Discography ==
=== EPs ===
- 2014: Stick Together

=== Singles ===
| Year | Single | Peak positions | Certification | Album |
| Year | Single | DEN | Certification | Album |
|---|---|---|---|---|
| 2014 | "Do Ya" | 1 | Gold (streaming) | Stick Together EP |
| 2014 | "Stick Together" | – | | Stick Together EP |
| 2017 | "Smoke In My Eyes" | – | N/A | Dansk Melodi Grand Prix 2017 |

| Preceded by Chresten Falck Damborg | X Factor (Denmark); Winner; 2014 | Succeeded by Emilie Esther |
