= Crazy (Christopher song) =

2014 single by Danish singer Christopher

Single by Christopher

from the album Told You So
- Released: 31 January 2014
- Length: 3:20
- Label: Parlophone, Warner Music Denmark
- Songwriters: Christopher Lund Nissen, Fridolin Nordsø, Mads Reinholdt, Fredrik Tao

Christopher singles chronology
"Told You So" (2013)	"Crazy" (2014)	"Mama" (2014)

"Crazy" is a song by Danish singer Christopher. It was released in January 2014 as the second single from Christopher's second studio album, Told You So. The song peaked at number 2 on the Danish charts.

== Reception ==
Scandipop called it "a catchy little pop song that manages to end up sounding like a cross between first-album-era-Christopher (bright and breezy guitar pop) and the first taste from his second album that we got at the end of last year, 'Told You So' (r&b pop). And actually – this amalgamation of the two ends up suiting him even more than either of them did on their own."

== Track listings ==
digital download/ streaming

1. "Crazy" - 3:20

digital download/ streaming

1. "Crazy" (acoustic) - 4:01

== Charts ==
=== Weekly charts ===
Chart (2014)	Peak position
Denmark (Tracklisten)	2

=== Year-end charts ===
Chart (2014)	Position
Denmark (Tracklisten)	34

== Certifications ==
Region	Certification	Certified units/sales
Denmark (IFPI Danmark)	Platinum	90,000^{‡}
^{‡} Sales+streaming figures based on certification alone.
