= I Told You So =

I Told You So may refer to:

== Songs ==
- "I Told You So" (Randy Travis song), a 1988 single, covered by Carrie Underwood in 2007
- "I Told You So" (Keith Urban song), a 2007 single
- "I Told You So" (Ocean Colour Scene song), a 2007 single
- "I Told You So" (Karmin song), a 2012 single
- "I Told You So", a 2018 single by Lady Kash
- "I Told You So", by Aretha Franklin from her 1962 album The Electrifying Aretha Franklin
- "I Told You So", by New Order from their 2005 album Waiting for the Sirens' Call and 2013 album Lost Sirens
- "I Told You So, by LVLY featuring Willow Smith from her 2019 album "Things I Love"

== Albums ==
- I Told You So (Count Basie album), a 1976 album
- I Told You So (Chino XL album), a 2001 album
- I Told You So: The Ultimate Hits of Randy Travis, a 2009 compilation album

== Other ==
- I Told You So (1970 film), a Ghanaian film directed by Egbert Adjesu
- I Told You So (2023 film), an Italian film directed by Ginevra Elkann

== See also ==
- Told You So (disambiguation)
