= Clara Mae =

Swedish singer-songwriter (born 1991)

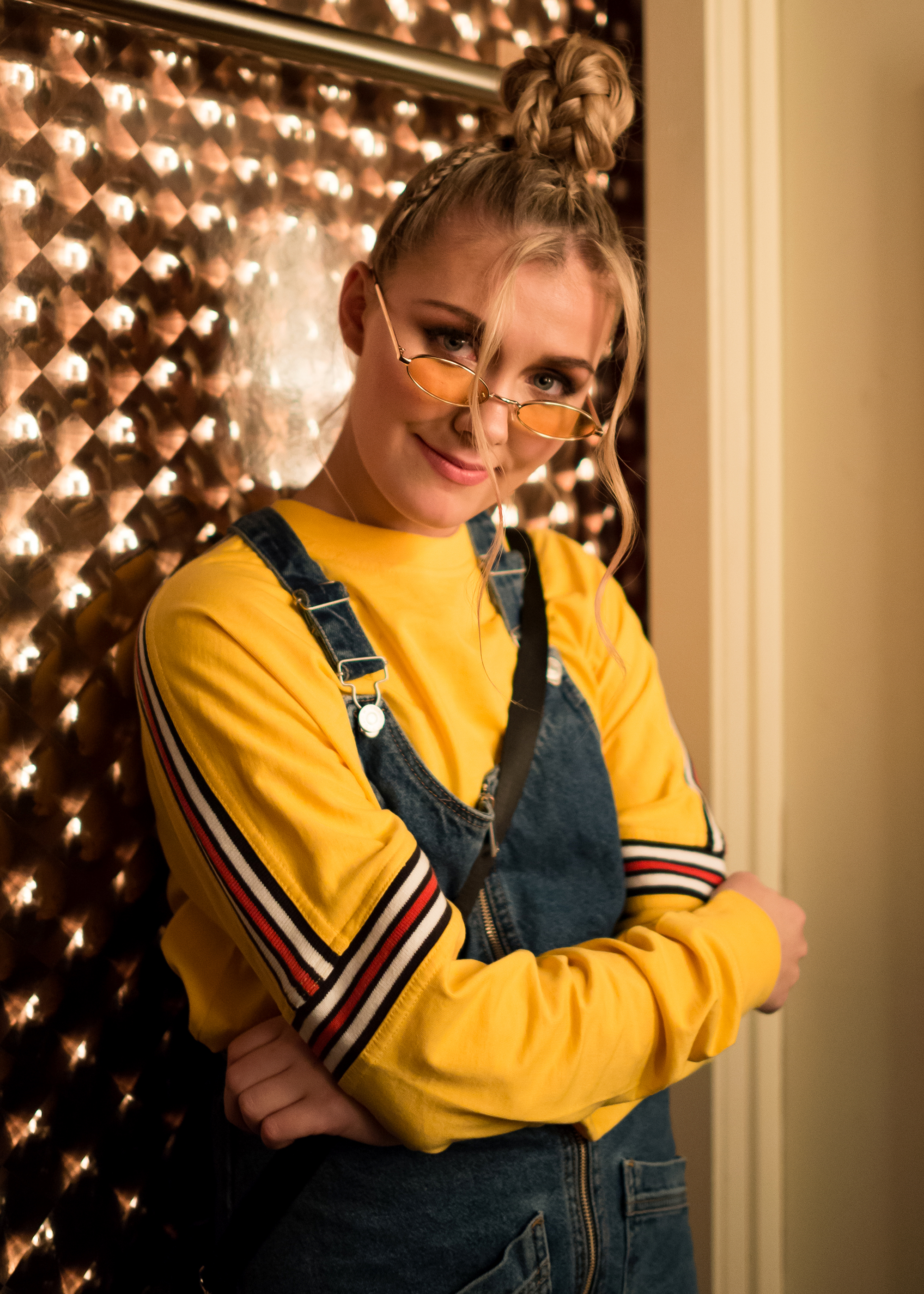
- Mae in 2018

Background information
- Born: Clara Fredrika Hagman; 9 July 1991 (age 35); Gävle, Sweden
- Genre: Pop
- Occupation: Singer
- Years active: 2002–present
- Labels: Big Beat; Atlantic
- Website: echomgmt.com/copy-of-clara-mae-1

Clara Fredrika Hagman (born 9 July 1991), known professionally as Clara Mae, is a Swedish singer and songwriter currently signed to Big Beat and Atlantic Records. She has released two major label singles: "I'm Not Her" and "I Forgot". From 2009 to 2012, Mae was a member of the Swedish pop group Ace of Base. In 2016, she was featured on and co-wrote the Kream song "Taped Up Heart", which peaked at number 21 on the Billboard Hot Dance/Electronic Songs chart.

== Early life ==
Clara Mae was born on 9 July 1991 in Gävle, Sweden. In 2002, she participated in the Lilla Melodifestivalen songwriting competition, performing an original song, "Hej, vem är du", and placing fourth. She also studied jazz vocals and piano for three years. She moved to Stockholm to pursue a career in music.

== Career ==
Early in her career, Clara Mae worked with producers David Guetta and Tiësto. In 2008, she appeared on the singing competition program Next Star where she performed Whitney Houston's "I Will Always Love You" and placed second. The following year, she competed on another singing competition program, Idol 2009. She performed Duffy's "Warwick Avenue" for her audition and Oh Laura's "Release Me" during the semi-final round, but failed to advance to the finals. Also in 2009, Clara Mae was recruited by Ulf Ekberg and Jonas Berggren to join Ace of Base. She and fellow new member Julia Williamson replaced former members Jenny and Linn Berggren and began recording a new album with the band in September 2009. The band released The Golden Ratio in September 2010, and Mae officially left Ace of Base in 2012.

In 2014, she officially adopted "Clara Mae" as her stage name and released her first song as a solo artist, "Changing Faces." She had been going by her birth name, Clara Hagman, prior to that. In 2015, she released a new single, "Avalon". In 2016, she was featured on the Steve Void & No Mondays song "Chemistry", and also released another solo single, "Strip".

That same year, she co-wrote and was featured on the Kream song "Taped Up Heart", which would go on to peak at number 21 on the Billboard Hot Dance/Electronic Songs chart and number 70 on the Swedish chart. She also performed at the Eurovision Song Contest 2016 as a backing vocalist for Gabriela Gunčíková, who represented the Czech Republic that year with "I Stand". Mae signed to Big Beat Records (an imprint of Atlantic Records) in 2017. She released her first major label single, "I'm Not Her", in November of that year. She released an acoustic version of the song in January 2018. Clara Mae was a featured artist on the Felix Jaehn song "Better", which was released in February 2018. Her second single on Big Beat, "I Forgot", was released in March 2018.

== Discography ==
=== Studio albums ===
Title	Album details
Drunk on Emotions	Released: 28 August 2020; Label: Big Beat; Formats: digital download

=== Extended plays ===
Title	EP details
Sorry for Writing All the Songs About You	Released: 14 September 2018; Label: Big Beat; Formats: digital download
Learning Experience	Released: 8 April 2022; Label: Universal; Formats: digital download

=== Singles ===
==== As lead artist ====
List of singles as lead artist, with selected chart positions, showing year released and album name
Title	Year	Peak chart positions	Album
Title	Year	US Elec.	Album
"I'm Not Her"	2017	—	Sorry for Writing All the Songs About You
"I Forgot"	2018	—	Sorry for Writing All the Songs About You
"Better Me Better You" (with Jake Miller)	2018	—	Sorry for Writing All the Songs About You
"Rooftop"	2018	—	Sorry for Writing All the Songs About You
"Call Your Girlfriend"	2018	—	Non-album single
"Lost"	2019	—	Drunk on Emotions
"Loved You Once"	2019	—	Drunk on Emotions
"Unmiss You"	2019	—	Drunk on Emotions
"More than OK" (with R3hab and Frank Walker)	2020	22	Non-album single
"Run Into You"	2020	—	Drunk on Emotions
"Overused" (featuring gnash)	2020	—	Drunk on Emotions
"Drunk on Emotions"	2020	—	Drunk on Emotions
"Alright" (featuring Russell Dickerson)	2020	—	Drunk on Emotions
"Någon annan"	2021	—	Non-album single
"Not Sad Anymore"	2021	—	Learning Experience
"Crash"	2021	—	Learning Experience
"Missing You Sucks"	2021	—	Learning Experience
"Miss the Party" (with Maximillian)	2022	—	Learning Experience
"Take Me Home" (with VAVO)	2022	—	Non-album singles
"When You're Young"	2023	—	Non-album singles
"Can't Do Both" (with Jonasu)	2023	—	Non-album singles
"Thank God These Walls Can't Talk"	2023	—	Non-album singles
"In The End" (with Dabin and Said The Sky)	2024	—	Non-album singles
"Wild Enough" (with Andreas Moe)	2024	—	Non-album singles
"The Player"	2024	—	Non-album singles
"Growing Pains"	2024	—	Non-album singles
"Once In A While" (with Josh Breaks)	2025	—	Non-album singles
"Tennessee"	2025	—	Non-album singles
"No Jolene"	2025	—	Non-album singles
"—" denotes a recording that did not chart or was not released in that territory.

==== As featured artist ====
List of singles as featured artist, with selected chart positions, showing year released and album name
Title	Year	Peak chart positions			Album
Title	Year	SWE	DEN	US Elec.	Album
"Taped Up Heart" (Kream featuring Clara Mae)	2016	70	—	21	Non-album single
"Good to Goodbye" (Christopher featuring Clara Mae)	2021	—	39	—	My Blood
"Hurricane" (Frank Walker featuring Clara Mae)	2025	—	—	—	Non-album single
"—" denotes a recording that did not chart or was not released in that territory.
