= Against the Odds (song) =

Single by Christopher

from the album Colours
- Released: 16 September 2011
- Recorded: 2011
- Genre: Pop
- Label: EMI Denmark
- Songwriters: Kasper Larsen; Ole Brodersen; Curtis Richa; Johan Wetterberg
- Producers: Kay & Ndustry; Lasse Lindorff

Christopher singles chronology
"Against the Odds" (2011)	"Nothing in Common" (2012)

Music video
- "Against the Odds" on YouTube

"Against the Odds" is the debut single by Danish singer Christopher released on EMI Denmark. It was co-written by Kay & Ndustry, Kasper Larsen, Ole Brodersen, Curtis Richa and Johan Wetterberg and produced by Kay & Ndustry and GL Music's Lasse Lindorff.

== Music video ==
The accompanying music video was directed by Nicolas Tobias Følsgaard and Jonas Lodahl Andersen showing Christopher and his friends in an outing.

== Charts ==
Weekly chart performance for "Against the Odds"
Chart (2011)	Peak position
Denmark (Tracklisten)	23

== Certifications ==
Region	Certification	Certified units/sales
Denmark (IFPI Danmark)	Gold	45,000^{‡}
^{‡} Sales+streaming figures based on certification alone.
