= With You (De Fam song) =

Single by De Fam featuring Brandon Beal
- Released: December 18, 2015
- Recorded: 2015
- Genre: Pop
- Length: 4:30
- Label: Tune Group Sdn Bhd Universal Music Group
- Songwriter(s): De Fam; Brandon Eujim O'Bryant Beal

"With You" is a song by Malaysian girl group De Fam featuring American singer and songwriter Brandon Beal. It was released on December 18, 2015 in iTunes.

== Music video ==
The song's accompanying music video was released on January 14, 2016 on De Fam's official YouTube channel. As of September 16, 2019, it has garnered more than 2.1 million views. The video was directed by Edmund Anand and featured 2 different locations which are the Banjaran Hot Springs in Ipoh and the Semenyih dam in Semenyih.
