= Frida Amundsen =

Norwegian singer and songwriter

Frida Waage Amundsen (born 9 September 1992) is a Norwegian singer and songwriter from Vaksdal Municipality.

In autumn 2009, she signed a recording contract with EMI, the debut album September Blue was released in 2012. The debut single "Closer" was released 20 May 2011. with considerable airplay on Norwegian radio stations. The song was written and produced by Lars K. Hustoft of Crystal Air Music and by Yngve Highland. Frida Amundsen has since climbed the charts in Germany, Italy, Austria, Switzerland, Sweden, Finland and Denmark.

== Discography ==
=== Albums ===
Year	Single	Peak chart positions
Year	Single	NOR
2012	September Blue	10
2015	What You Asked For	—

=== Singles ===
Year	Title	Album
2011	"Closer"	September Blue
2012	"Rush"	September Blue
2014	"What If"	What You Asked For
2015	"Told You So"	What You Asked For

Featured in

Year	Title	Album
2012	"Colours" (Christopher feat. Frida Amundsen)	Christopher album Colours
2018	"One More Day" (Afrojack, Jewelz & Sparks) (Uncredited)	Non-album single
2026	"Another World" (Frida Amundsen, SAKIMA)	Control Resonant soundtrack album Zoe's Mixtape
2026	"A World I'm Ready To Live And Die For" (costee, Frida Amundsen)	Control Resonant soundtrack album Zoe's Mixtape
