= Colours (Christopher album) =

Studio album by Christopher
- Released: 23 March 2012
- Recorded: 2011–2012
- Genre: Pop
- Label: EMI Denmark
- Producers: Kay & Ndustry, Lasse Lindorff, GL Music

Christopher chronology
Colours (2012)	Told You So (2014)

Singles from Colours
- 1. "Against the Odds" Released: September 2011; 2. "Nothing in Common" Released: January 2012; 3. "Mine, Mine, Mine" Released: April 2012; 4. "Colours" Released: October 2012

Colours is the debut studio album of Danish singer Christopher released on EMI Denmark. Two singles were released from the album prior. They are "Against the Odds" and "Nothing in Common".

A special edition was released on 19 March 2012.

== Track listing ==
No.	Title	Writer(s)	Producer(s)	Length
1.	"Mine, Mine, Mine"	Boe Larsen, Marcus Winther-John	Kay & Ndustry, Lasse Lindorff	3:15
2.	"Nothing in Common"	C. Nissen, Kasper Larsen, Kim Nowak-Zorde, L. Lindorff, Ole Brodersen	Kay & Ndustry, L. Lindorff	3:39
3.	"Avalanche"	C. Nissen, D'Cruz, Jakob Glæsner	Kay & Ndustry, L. Lindorff	3:50
4.	"Set The Record Straight"	C. Nissen, Daniel Fält, M. Winther-John	GL Music	3:48
5.	"Against the Odds"	C. Richa, Johan "Jones" Wetterberg, K. Larsen, Ole Brodersen	Kay & Ndustry, L. Lindorff	3:42
6.	"Morning Light"	C. Nissen, Frederik Nordsø, L. Lindorff	Kay & Ndustry, L. Lindorff	4:02
7.	"Unbreakable"	C. Nissen, D. Fält, Julia Fabrin	GL Music	3:34
8.	"Big Mistake"	C. Nissen, D. Fält, J. Fabrin	GL Music, Kay & Ndustry	3:14
9.	"Colours" (featuring Frida Amundsen)	C. Nissen, K. Larsen, O. Brodersen, Victoria Hansen	Kay & Ndustry, L. Lindorff	3:42
10.	"Still in Love"	C. Nissen, K. Larsen, L. Lindorff, O. Brodersen	Kay & Ndustry, L. Lindorff	3:56
11.	"Lots of Downs"	C. Nissen, D. Fält, Winther-John	GL Music	3:30

Special edition
No.	Title	Length
12.	"Avalanche" (acoustic)	3:20
13.	"Set the Record Straight" (acoustic)	4:06
14.	"Nothing in Common" (piano version)	4:18
15.	"Call Your Girlfriend"	2:32
16.	"Colours" (with Frida Amundsen)	3:17
17.	"A Little Forgiveness" (Molly Sandén featuring Christopher)	3:47

== Charts ==
Weekly chart performance for Colours
Chart (2012)	Peak position
Danish Albums (Hitlisten)	4

== Certifications ==
Region	Certification	Certified units/sales
Denmark (IFPI Danmark)	Platinum	20,000^{‡}
^{‡} Sales+streaming figures based on certification alone.
