= Hope This Song Is for You =

Single by Christopher

from the album A Beautiful Life
- Released: 28 April 2023
- Length: 2:35
- Label: Parlophone, Warner Music Denmark
- Songwriters: C. Nissen, Jeppe London, Daniel Schulz Jeppe London
- Producer: Jeppe London

Christopher singles chronology
"My Only Hope" (2022)	"Hope This Song Is for You" (2023)	"Valdes jul" (2023)

Music video
- Christopher - Hope This Song Is For You (From the Netflix Film 'A Beautiful Life') [Official Audio] on YouTube

"Hope This Song Is for You" is a song by Danish singer, Christopher. It was released in April 2023 as the lead and only single from the soundtrack A Beautiful Life. It peaked at number 5 on the Danish charts and was certified gold.

== Charts ==
Weekly chart performance for "Hope This Song Is for You"
Chart (2023)	Peak position
Denmark (Tracklisten)	5

== Certifications ==
Region	Certification	Certified units/sales
Denmark (IFPI Danmark)	Gold	45,000^{‡}
^{‡} Sales+streaming figures based on certification alone.
