= Under the Surface (Christopher album) =

Studio album by Christopher
- Released: 22 February 2019
- Label: Parlophone

Christopher chronology
Closer (2016)	Under the Surface (2019)	My Blood (2021)

Singles from Under the Surface
- 1. "Bad" Released: 13 April 2018; 2. "Monogamy" Released: 29 June 2018; 3. "Irony" Released: 5 October 2018; 4. "My Heart" Released: 22 February 2019; 5. "Real Life" Released: 19 July 2019

Under the Surface is the fourth studio album by Danish singer Christopher. It was released on 22 February 2019 and peaked at number 5 on the Danish charts.

== Track listing ==
Under the Surface track listing
No.	Title	Writer(s)	Length
1.	"My Heart"	Christopher Nissen, Jamie Scott	3:16
2.	"Real Life" (only included on the physical issue)		3:18
3.	"The Chancer"	Nissen, Scott	3:42
4.	"Irony"	Nissen, Petter Tarland, Pär Westerlund	3:28
5.	"High"	Nissen, Joakim Olovsson, Alexander Tidebrink, Westerlund	3:05
6.	"Grow Up"	Nissen, Emil Sebastian Albæk Falk, Anders Stig Gehrt-Bendixen, Andreas Krueger	3:04
7.	"Just Kiss Me"	Nissen, Scott	3:27
8.	"Bad"	Nissen, Aron Blom, Lenno Linjama, Tidebrink	3:11
9.	"Monogamy"	Nissen, Engelina Andrina, Brandon Beal, Chester Joseph Henderson, Jens Høy, Maria Smith, Victor Thell	3:04

== Charts ==
=== Weekly charts ===
Weekly chart performance for Under the Surface
Chart (2016)	Peak position
Danish Albums (Hitlisten)	5

=== Year-end charts ===
Year-end chart performance for Under the Surface
Chart (2019)	Position
Danish Albums (Hitlisten)	45

== Certifications ==
Region	Certification	Certified units/sales
Denmark (IFPI Danmark)	Platinum	20,000^{‡}
^{‡} Sales+streaming figures based on certification alone.
