= Bad Boy (Chung Ha and Christopher song) =

2020 single by Chung Ha and Christopher

Single by Chung Ha and Christopher
- Released: September 23, 2020
- Recorded: 2020
- Genre: Pop
- Length: 3:03
- Label: MNH; Parlophone Denmark; Warner Music Korea
- Songwriters: Park Sung-jin; Kim Jae-woong; Park Ki-hyun; Anna Timgren

Chung Ha singles chronology
"Play" (2020)	"Bad Boy" (2020)	"Dream of You" (2020)

Christopher singles chronology
"Leap of Faith" (2020)	"Bad Boy" (2020)	"Good to Goodbye" (2021)

Music video
- "Bad Boy (MNH)" on YouTube "Bad Boy (Warner Music Korea)" on YouTube

"Bad Boy" is a song by South Korean singer Chung Ha and Danish singer Christopher. It was released on September 23, 2020, by MNH Entertainment, Parlophone Denmark and Warner Music Korea.

== Background ==
The artists' first collaboration work was originally planned to showcase during Christopher's concert in Korea this year, which was canceled due to the coronavirus pandemic.

Christopher, known for his love for Korea and K-pop, brought up the idea of working with a K-pop star for his concert.

MNH Entertainment said that Warner Music Korea offered Chung Ha the idea, and she gladly accepted it because she had been a fan of Christopher's music.

== Composition and lyrics ==
"Bad Boy" was written by Park Sung-jin, Kim Jae-woong, Park Ki-hyun and Anna Timgren. It runs for three minutes and three seconds. The upbeat track talks about a man who would want to be a "bad boy" to win her back ― is woven through with the artists' smooth vocals.

== Commercial performance ==
The song topped the chart on Bugs music, and was second on Genie Music's chart, one day after the release.

== Music video ==
The music video was released on September 28, 2020.

== Awards and nominations ==
Year	Award	Category	Result	Ref.
2021	10th Gaon Chart Music Awards	Artist of the Year – Digital Music (September 2020)	Won	

== Charts ==
Chart performance for "Bad Boy"
Chart (2020)	Peak position
South Korea (Gaon)	31

== Release history ==
Release formats for "Bad Boy"
Region	Date	Format	Label	Ref.
Various	September 23, 2020	CD; download; streaming	MNH; Parlophone Denmark; Warner Music	
