= Let the Truth Be Told =

Let the Truth Be Told may refer to:

- Let the Truth Be Told (Z-Ro album), a 2005 album by Z-Ro
- Let the Truth Be Told (Laura Izibor album), a 2009 album by Laura Izibor

== See also ==
- Truth Be Told (disambiguation)
