= Golden (Brandon Beal song) =

Single by Brandon Beal featuring Lukas Graham

from the album Truth
- Released: 5 February 2016
- Genre: Pop
- Length: 3:26
- Label: Then We Take the World; Universal Denmark
- Songwriters: B. Beal; Lukas Forchhammer; R. Johnson; R. Hedegaard
- Producer: Hennedub

Brandon Beal singles chronology
"Smile & Wave" (2015)	"Golden" (2016)	"Paradise" (2017)

Lukas Graham singles chronology
"7 Years" (2015)	"Golden" (2016)	"You're Not There" (2016)

"Golden" is a single by American singer and songwriter Brandon Beal, featuring vocals from Danish band Lukas Graham. The song was released as a digital download in Denmark on 5 February 2016 through Then We Take the World and Universal Music Denmark. The song peaked at number one on the Danish Singles Chart. The song also charted in Norway, Germany and Sweden.

== Music video ==
A music video to accompany the release of "Golden" was first released onto YouTube on 11 February 2016. The video is based on a true story of Brandon's life leading up to his music career.

== Charts ==
=== Weekly charts ===
Chart (2016)	Peak position
Austria (Ö3 Austria Top 40)	64
Denmark (Tracklisten)	1
Germany (GfK)	46
Norway (VG-lista)	27
Sweden (Sverigetopplistan)	55

=== Year-end charts ===
Chart (2016)	Position
Denmark (Tracklisten)	19

== Certifications ==
Region	Certification	Certified units/sales
Denmark (IFPI Danmark)	3× Platinum	270,000^{‡}
Norway (IFPI Norway)	Platinum	40,000^{‡}
Sweden (GLF)	Gold	20,000^{‡}
^{‡} Sales+streaming figures based on certification alone.

== Release history ==
Region	Date	Format	Label
Denmark	5 February 2016	Digital download	Then We Take the World; Universal Denmark
