= Next Persian Star =

Next Persian Star is an Iranian TV show produced and broadcast by TV Persia [1] channel. It's a talent finding show like American Idol or America's got talent.
