= Next Star (Swedish TV series) =

- Country of origin: Sweden
- No. of seasons: 3

Original release
- Release: 2008 – 2010

Next Star is a Swedish singing reality competition television series for youths between the age of 13–19. The series was developed in 2007 by ICA Maxi in cooperation with Diggiloo, and aired between 2008 and 2010. The winner of the contest would perform at the Diggiloo summer tour all over Sweden. The winner is decided by a jury and also by votes from the Swedish people. The surplus of the voting would go to the World Childhood Foundation. Next Star has brought in 1.2 million (SEK) to the foundation.

== Winners ==
Year	Winner	Age	City
2008	Vendela Palmgren	13	Saltsjöbaden
2009	Alexandra Liljekvist	19	Malmö
2010	Madeleine Liljestam	19	Asmundtorp

== Next Star 2008 ==
=== Finalists & result ===
Nr:	Name	Age	City	Song	Place
1	Vendela Palmgren	13	Saltsjöbaden	"Här står jag"	1
2	Jessica Taylor	15	Vetlanda	"I Turn To You"	4*
3	Clara Hagman	17	Gävle	"I Will Always Love You"	2
4	Robin Blom	18	Alingsås	"This Love"	4*
5	Ellen Jonsson	13	Eskilstuna	"If You Can Dream"	3
6	Mikaela Samuelsson	14	Tollered	"I'm Blessed"	4*
7	Alexandra Liljekvist	17	Limhamn	"Barfotavisan"	4*
8	Amanda Björneskog	13	Höllviken	"Gå din egen väg"	4*
9	Andréas Johansson	17	Piteå	"Starkare"	4*
10	Luciano Axelsson	14	Spånga	"My Girl"	4*
11	Stephanie Bonelli	15	Tumba	"Home (song)"	4*
12	Lina Hansson	18	Vansbro	"Go On"	4*

(*) The 9 remaining finalists shares the fourth place.

== Next Star 2009 ==
=== Finalists & result ===
Nr:	Name	Age	City	Song	Place
1	Amanda Zälle	19	Stockholm	"At Last (My love has come along)"	3
2	Marcus Sjöstrand	16	Gothenburg	"If You're Not The One"	4*
3	Rebecka Norman	13	Norrköping	"Only Hope"	4*
4	Hanna Olsson	14	Umeå	"This Is Me"	4*
5	Alexandra Liljekvist	19	Malmö	"Somliga går med trasiga skor"	1
6	Anton Hildorsson	17	Vetlanda	"Last Request"	4*
7	Julia Ingvarsson	16	Huskvarna	"Mio My Mio"	2
8	Mimmi Sandén	13	Stockholm	"Didn't We Almost Have It All"	4*
9	Emil Ehnberg	18	Halmstad	"Nu är det drömmar"	4*
10	Julia Forssell	15	Växjö	"The Story"	4*

(*) The 7 remaining finalists shares the fourth place.

== Next Star 2010 ==
=== Finalists ===
Nr:	Name	Age	City	Song	Place
1	Hedvig Becke	17	Trelleborg	"Tro och hopp"	3
2	Rebecka Laakso	17	Uppsala	"Not That Kinda Girl"	2
3	Victor Fritz-Crone	18	Häggvik	?	4*
4	Sofie Bergman	19	Råå	"When You Believe"	4*
5	Sofia Olsson	15	Kristinehamn	"I'd Rather Go Blind"	4*
6	Jonna Falk	14	Växjö	"Our Song"	4*
7	Jim Stefánsson	19	Valbo	"I'll Stand By You"	4*
8	Madeleine Liljestam	19	Asmundtorp	"Hurt"	1
9	Jonna Torstensson	15	Högsäter	"First Time"	4*
10	Michaela Hanzén	17	Jönköping	"The Climb"	4*

(*) The 7 remaining finalists shares the fourth place.
