= Truth Be Told =

Truth Be Told may refer to:

== Books ==
- Truth Be Told (novel) or Are You Sleeping, a 2017 novel by Kathleen Barber; basis for the 2019 TV series (see below)
- Truth Be Told: My Journey Through Life and the Law, a 2019 book by Beverley McLachlin

== Film and television ==
- Truth Be Told, a 2002 film starring Blair Underwood
- Truth Be Told (2007 film), a Singaporean drama film
- Truth Be Told (2012 film), a documentary about growing up in the Jehovah's Witnesses denomination
- Truth Be Told (2015 TV series), an American sitcom
- Truth Be Told (2019 TV series), an American drama series

=== Television episodes ===
- "The Truth Be Told", an episode of Roseanne
- "Truth Be Told" (Alias)
- "Truth Be Told" (Boston Legal)
- "Truth Be Told" (Dexter)
- "Truth Be Told" (Modern Family)
- "Truth Be Told" (The Night Agent)

== Music ==
- Truth Be Told (Blues Traveler album), 2003
- Truth Be Told (Shed Seven album), 2001
- Truth Be Told, Part 1, an EP by Greyson Chance, 2012
- "Truth Be Told", a song by Architects from Daybreaker
- "Truth Be Told", a song by Megadeth from The System Has Failed
- "Truth Be Told", a song by Phinehas from Till the End

== See also ==
- Let the Truth Be Told (disambiguation)
