= My Blood (Christopher album) =

Studio album by Christopher
- Released: 26 March 2021
- Length: 27:51
- Label: Parlophone

Christopher chronology
| Under the Surface (2019) | My Blood (2021) | A Beautiful Life (2023) |

Singles from My Blood
- 1. "Ghost" Released: 17 January 2020; 2. "Leap of Faith" Released: 22 May 2020; 3. "Good to Goodbye" Released: 8 January 2021; 4. "Fall So Hard" Released: 12 March 2021

My Blood is the fifth studio album by Danish singer Christopher. It was released on 26 March 2021 and peaked at number 20 on the Danish charts.

== Track listing ==
My Blood track listing
| No. | Title | Writer(s) | Length |
|---|---|---|---|
| 1. | "Fall So Hard" | Christopher Nissen, Jeppe London Bilsby, Mads Lundengaard, Celine Svanbäck | 3:34 |
| 2. | "Ghost" | Nissen, Dave Gibson, Neil Ormandy, Martin Wave | 3:13 |
| 3. | "Good to Goodbye" (featuring Clara Mae) | Nissen, Mae | 3:04 |
| 4. | "My Blood" | Nissen, Kris Eriksson, Lina Hansson | 2:42 |
| 5. | "Lovechild" | Nissen, Bilsby, Lundengaard, Svanbäck | 2:41 |
| 6. | "Leap of Faith" | Nissen, Alex Hauer, Thuy My Pham | 3:37 |
| 7. | "Just So You Know" | Nissen, Bilsby, Lundengaard, David Sneddon, Svanbäck, Pär Westerlund | 3:15 |
| 8. | "Aiming" | Nissen, Petter Tarland, Westerlund | 2:47 |
| 9. | "Stones" (featuring Daniel Schultz) | Nissen, Lasse Baunkilde, Schultz | 2:55 |

== Charts ==
Weekly chart performance for My Blood
| Chart (2021) | Peak position |
|---|---|
| Danish Albums (Hitlisten) | 20 |

== Certifications ==
| Region | Certification | Certified units/sales |
|---|---|---|
| Denmark (IFPI Danmark) | Gold | 10,000^{‡} |
^{‡} Sales+streaming figures based on certification alone.
