= Nothing in Common (Christopher song) =

Single by Christopher

from the album Colours
- Released: January 2012
- Recorded: 2011
- Genre: Pop
- Label: EMI Denmark
- Songwriters: C. Nissen, Kasper Larsen, Kim Nowak-Zorde, L. Lindorff, Ole Brodersen
- Producers: Kay & Ndustry; Lasse Lindorff

Christopher singles chronology
"Against the Odds" (2011)	"Nothing in Common" (2012)	"Mine, Mine, Mine" (2012)

Music video
- "Nothing in Common" on YouTube

"Nothing in Common" is a song by Christopher, released in January 2012 as the second single from his debut album Colours.

== Charts ==
Weekly chart performance for "Nothing in Common"
Chart (2012)	Peak position
Denmark (Tracklisten)	5

== Certifications ==
Region	Certification	Certified units/sales
Denmark (IFPI Danmark)	Platinum	90,000^{‡}
^{‡} Sales+streaming figures based on certification alone.
