= Told You So (Christopher song) =

Single by Christopher

from the album Told You So
- Released: September 2013
- Recorded: 2013
- Genre: Pop
- Length: 3:30
- Label: Warner Music Denmark / Parlophone Denmark
- Songwriters: Christopher Nissen, Brandon Beal, Frederik Nordsø, Fridolin Nordsø
- Producers: Frederik Nordsø, Fridolin Nordsø

Christopher singles chronology
"We Should Be" (2013)	"Told You So" (2013)	"Crazy" (2014)

Music video
- "Told You So" on YouTube

"Told You So" is a song by the Danish singer Christopher. It was released in September 2013 as the lead single from his second studio album of the same name. The song peaked at number 4 on the Danish chart

== Track listings ==
digital download

1. "Told You So" - 3:30

digital download

1. "Told You So" (Daxter remix) - 4:37
2. "Told You So" (Oscar Bandersen remix) - 4:20

== Charts ==
Weekly chart performance for "Told You So"
Chart (2013–2014)	Peak position
Denmark (Tracklisten)	5

== Certifications ==
Region	Certification	Certified units/sales
Denmark (IFPI Danmark)	2× Platinum	180,000^{‡}
^{‡} Sales+streaming figures based on certification alone.
