= A Beautiful Life (2023 film) =

2023 film by Mehdi Avaz

- Directed by: Mehdi Avaz
- Written by: Stefan Jaworski
- Produced by: Anna Malmkjær Willumsen; Julie Rix Bomholt
- Starring: Christopher Lund Nissen; Inga Ibsdotter Lilleaas; Christine Albeck Borge; Ardalan Esmaili; Sebastian Jessen; Rasmus Skrettingland Heidelbach
- Music by: Thomas Volmer Schulz
- Production company: SF Studios
- Distributed by: Netflix
- Release date: 1 June 2023 (Netflix)
- Running time: 99 minutes
- Country: Denmark
- Language: Danish

A Beautiful Life is a 2023 Danish drama romance music film directed by Mehdi Avaz and starring Christopher Lund Nissen. It was released on 1 June 2023 by Netflix.

== Plot ==
Elliott is a young Danish fisherman who lost his family in an accident and was orphaned as a child. With little money in his pocket, his luck is an extraordinary voice. One night, while performing at a club to do his friend Oliver a favor, he is noticed by the successful music manager, Suzanne. Soon, Suzanne pairs Elliott with her estranged daughter and music producer, Lilly. Elliott accepts their help and tries to write and record a song. Success comes quickly, almost overwhelmingly. On his way to becoming a star, the young man must deal with unexpected popularity, growing feelings for Lilly, and unresolved issues from the past.

== Critical reception ==
On review aggregator Rotten Tomatoes, the film has an approval rating of 50% based on 6 reviews, with an average rating of 5.2/10.

== Soundtrack ==
A Beautiful Life

Soundtrack album by Christopher
- Released: 1 June 2023
- Length: 30:34
- Labels: Parlophone, Warner

Christopher chronology
My Blood (2021)	A Beautiful Life (2023)	Fools Gold (2025)

Singles from A Beautiful Life
- 1. "Hope This Song Is for You" Released: 28 April 2023

A soundtrack was released on 2 June 2023.

=== Track listing ===
A Beautiful Life
No.	Title	Writer(s)	Length
1.	"A Beautiful Life"	Christopher Lund Nissen; Petter Tarland; Pär Westerlund	3:38
2.	"Hope This Song Is for You"	Christopher Lund Nissen; Daniel Schulz; Jeppe London	2:35
3.	"Would Ya"	Christopher Lund Nissen; Fredrik Tao Nordsø Schjoldan	3:37
4.	"Honey, I'm So High"	Christopher Lund Nissen; Fredrik Tao Nordsø Schjoldan; Fridolin Nordsø Schjoldan	2:57
5.	"Ready to Go"	Christopher Lund Nissen; Daniel Schulz; Thomas Drachmann	2:03
6.	"Led Me to You"	Christopher Lund Nissen; Jeppe London	3:29
7.	"Book of Me"	Christopher Lund Nissen; Daniel Schulz; Elias Kapari; Gustav Wolter	3:23
8.	"Hey Love"	Christopher Lund Nissen	2:46
9.	"Hope This Song Is for You" (John Alto remix)	Christopher Lund Nissen; Daniel Schulz; Jeppe London	2:41

=== Weekly charts ===
Chart performance for A Beautiful Life
Chart (2023)	Peak position
Austrian Albums (Ö3 Austria)	51
Belgian Albums (Ultratop Flanders)	171
Danish Albums (Hitlisten)	1
Swiss Albums (Schweizer Hitparade)	26

=== Certifications ===
Region	Certification	Certified units/sales
Denmark (IFPI Danmark)	Platinum	20,000^{‡}
^{‡} Sales+streaming figures based on certification alone.
