= Happy Home (song) =

Single by Hedegaard featuring Lukas Graham
- Released: 10 March 2014
- Recorded: 2013
- Genre: Electropop, pop
- Length: 3:37
- Label: Copenhagen; Universal Denmark
- Songwriters: Rasmus Hedegaard; Lukas Forchhammer
- Producer: Hedegaard

Lukas Graham singles chronology
"Better Than Yourself (Criminal Mind Pt 2)" (2012)	"Happy Home" (2014)	"Mama Said" (2014)

"Happy Home" is a song by Danish DJ Hedegaard featuring Danish band Lukas Graham. The song was co-written by Hedegaard himself and Lukas Graham's frontman Lukas Forchhammer. Released on Copenhagen Records in association with Universal Music Denmark, it reached number one on Hitlisten, the Danish Official Singles Chart.

The song received heavy play on the Danish radio station P3 and was put in heavy rotation on several other Danish radio stations. On streaming and sale, it was number one for several weeks in Denmark and now has accumulated more than 31 million streams total (until February 2015).

After a performance of the song on the Norwegian talk show Senkveld med Thomas og Harald, it became number one on the Norwegian iTunes and was certified 3× Platinum on streaming in Norway. and peaked at number four on VG-lista, the official Norwegian Singles Chart. It also cracked the top 40 on Sverigetopplistan, the official Swedish Singles Chart.

== Awards ==
In 2014, Hedegaard won a Danish Grammy as "Producer of the Year" for the hit "Happy Home" during the Danish Music Awards 2014.

== Charts ==
Chart (2015)	Peak position
Denmark (Tracklisten)	1
Norway (VG-lista)	4
Sweden (Sverigetopplistan)	40

== Certifications ==
Region	Certification	Certified units/sales
Denmark (IFPI Danmark)	Gold	15,000^{^}
Denmark (IFPI Danmark) Lukas Graham version	Platinum	90,000^{‡}
Sweden (GLF)	Platinum	40,000^{‡}
Streaming
Denmark (IFPI Danmark)	3× Platinum	7,800,000^{†}
^{^} Shipments figures based on certification alone.^{‡} Sales+streaming figures based on certification alone.^{†} Streaming-only figures based on certification alone.
