= Hedegaard (DJ) =

Danish DJ and record producer

- Born: Rasmus Hedegård Sørensen; 25 July 1988 (age 38)
- Origin: Randers, Denmark
- Genres: EDM; house; G-house; dance-pop; future bass; tropical house
- Occupations: DJ; producer
- Years active: 2009–present
- Label: Copenhagen Records
- Website: hedegaardmusic.com

Rasmus Hedegård Sørensen (born 25 July 1988), known professionally as Hedegaard (sometimes stylized as HEDEGAARD), is a Danish DJ, music producer, and the founder of the record label OneHundred, in partnership with Spinnin' Records.

He is signed to Copenhagen Records, and is managed by Daylight Agency. His official 2011 remix of Snoop Dogg and Dr. Dre's "The Next Episode" made him breakthrough internationally and was streamed more than 235 million times on YouTube.

Hedegaard is known for songs such as "Happy Home" feat. Lukas Graham, "Twerk It Like Miley" with Brandon Beal and Christopher, as well as "Jumanji" and "Beijing Baby" created in collaboration with Cancun. As of 2022, his tracks streaming count on the Spotify platform is over 54 million.

== Career ==
Hedegaard is a musician and songwriter, and his music is a fusion of rap, hip-hop, and club music. He started his career remixing tracks for Danish nightclubs and uploading them to YouTube, including his unofficial remix of Snoop Dogg and Dr. Dre's hit "The Next Episode", which made Hedegaard well known across Europe. The song had been streamed more than 235 million times on YouTube. He has also remixed 50 Cent, Macklemore, Basto, Ludacris, Stromae, Ed Sheeran, Snoop Dogg, Eminem and Rihanna. Remixes like "The Next Episode", "Thrift Shop", "Move Bitch", "In Da Club", and "P.I.M.P" formed the basis for the sound that became characteristic of Hedegaard as a DJ and placed him on the charts in several countries.

In 2012, Hedegaard helped produce and write the hit single "Better Than Yourself" for Danish band Lukas Graham. In 2014, Hedegaard collaborated again with Lukas Graham on the single "Happy Home", which later went platinum in several Scandinavian countries. The song was played heavily on the Danish radio station P3 and was put in a rotation on several other radio stations. On streaming and sales charts, it was number 1 for several weeks in Denmark and has now accumulated more than 38 million streams in total as of July 2017. After performing on the Norwegian talk show Senkveld med Thomas og Harald, the song became number 1 on the Norwegian iTunes and was certified three-times platinum on streaming in Norway. Hedegaard won the "Producer of the Year" award for "Happy Home" at the 2014 Danish Music Awards, and won another award for "Most Played Song Of The Year" at the 2015 Carl Prisen.

Later in 2014, Hedegaard released "Twerk It Like Miley" featuring Brandon Beal and Christopher. Upon release, the song had more than 56 million streams on Spotify and 158 million views on YouTube, and reached number 1 in some Asian countries. "Twerk It Like Miley" won three awards at the 2015 Danish DeeJay Awards and is certified three-times platinum in Denmark, platinum in Philippines, and gold in Indonesia, Taiwan and Thailand. In 2016, "Twerk It Like Miley" had been streamed more than 147 million times on Spotify (including remix versions), and played more than 400 million times on YouTube.

Hedegaard won the "Producer of the Year" award at the 2016 Club Awards as well as the "Audience Award" at the 2016 Danish DeeJay Awards. Subsequently, he won the prize for "Remix of the Year" at the 2017 Danish DeeJay Awards for the remix of "Slem Igen".

In 2017, Hedegaard's single "That's Me" was released and has since gained 40 million streams on Spotify. The song includes vocals from Australian singer and songwriter Hayley Warner, and in the spring of 2017, Hedegaard and Warner met up in Los Angeles and wrote the single "Go Back".

In 2019, Hedegaard released the single "Ready to Love You", which culminated over 42 million streams on Spotify. On the singles "Jumanji", a collaboration with Danish-based rapper Cancun, and "SA-MY-D", a collaboration with Danish DJ Matt Hawk, Hedegaard returned to the rap-club fusion sound he was known for years ago, under the genre "car music" – music particularly suited for a large car stereo system.

Hedegaard released the single "All Designer" in 2021, resulting in number 1 rankings in Southern Europe, the Baltics, and China - followed by the hit single "Jeep", another collaboration with Cancun, which entered the top 20 on QQ Music's EDM Chart in China.

In 2023, Hedegaard, in partnership with Dutch record label Spinnin' Records, founded the sublabel OneHundred.

At the end of 2023, he went on his biggest tour to date, stretching from Jakarta and Bali in Indonesia, to the Creamfields festival in Guangzhou, China, and then onto Hawaii, where he began his first tour of the United States, which took him through cities including San Diego, Boston, Denver, and Sacramento.

Hedegaard was formerly managed by Then We Take The World with Lasse Siegismund and Kasper Færk, before his current management became Daylight Agency.

== Discography ==
=== Singles ===
Year	Title	Peak chart positions			Certification
Year	Title	DEN	SWE	NOR	Certification
2010	"Money" (feat. Brandon Beal)	—	—	—	
2012	"Scary Christmas"	—	—	—	
2013	"Too Drunk"	—	—	—	
2013	"Busy"	—	—	—	
2013	"Kysset Med Medina" (feat. Oliver Kesi)	25	—	—	Gold (streaming)
2013	"The Blow Anthem"	—	—	—	
2014	"Happy Home" (feat. Lukas Graham)	1	40	4	3× Platinum (streaming DK); 3× Platinum (streaming NZ); 1× Platinum (streaming SE); 3× Platinum (streaming NOR); Gold (download DK)
2014	"Twerk It Like Miley" (Brandon Beal feat. Christopher)	1	—	—	3× Platinum (streaming DK); 1× Platinum (streaming PH); 1× Gold (streaming ID); 1× Gold (streaming TW); 1× Gold (streaming TH); 1× Gold (streaming K); Gold (download)
2014	"Make You Proud"	21	—	—	
2015	"Shake The Ground" (feat. Brandon Beal & Bekuh Boom)	—	—	—	
2015	"Smile & Wave" (feat. Brandon Beal)	12	—	—	Platinum (streaming)
2015	"Happy Home (feat. Lukas Graham) [Sam Feldt Remix]	—	—	—	
2016	"Going Home" (feat. Patrick Dorgan & Nabiha)	—	—	—	
2016	"Keep Dreaming" (feat. Stine Bramsen)	—	—	—	
2016	"Keep Dreaming (Club Edit)" (feat. Stine Bramsen)	—	—	—	
2017	"That's Me"	34	—	—	
2017	"Ready to Love You"	—	— (Note: "Ready to Love You" did not enter the Sverigetopplistan singles chart, but peaked at number 13 on the Sverigetopplistan Heatseekers chart.)	—	
2018	"Salvation" (feat. JRM & Katie Pearlman)	—	—	—	
2018	"Need You Right Now" (feat. Hayley Warner)	—	—	—	
2021	"Du gør det godt" (Basim feat. Johnson and Hedegaard)	22	—	—	
"—" denotes a recording that did not chart or was not released in that territory.

=== Production credits ===
Year	Artist	Album	Song	Role
2018	Lukas Graham	3 (The Purple Album)	Not A Damn Thing Changed	Producer/Writer
2022	NCT 127	2 Baddies	Faster	Producer

=== Remixes ===
- 50 Cent – P.I.M.P. (Hedegaard Remix)
- Jimilian feat. Ceci Luca – Slem Igen (Hedegaard Remix)
- 50 Cent – Disco Inferno (Hedegaard Remix)
- Brandon Beal ft. Christopher – Twerk It Like Miley (Hedegaard Remix)
- Christopher ft. Brandon Beal – CPH Girls (Hedegaard Remix)
- Kesi – Søvnløs (Hedegaard Remix)
- Hedegaard ft. Lukas Graham – Happy Home (Club Edit)
- Eminem ft. Rihanna – The Monster (Hedegaard Remix)
- Eminem ft. Nate Dogg – Shake That (Hedegaard & Matt Hawk Remix)
- Macklemore – Thrift Shop (Hedegaard Remix)
- Ludacris – Move Bitch (Hedegaard Remix)
- Lukas Graham – Ordinary Things (Hedegaard Remix)
- Dr. Dre – The Next Episode ft. Snoop Dogg, Kurupt, Nate Dogg (Hedegaard Remix)
- 50 Cent – In Da Club (Hedegaard Remix)

== Awards and nominations ==
Year	Award	Category	Nominee	Result
2014	Danish Music Awards	Danish Producer of the Year	Hedegaard	Won
2014	Danish Music Awards	Clubhit of the Year	"Twerk It Like Miley"	Won
2014	Danish Music Awards	Hit of the Year	"Happy Home"	Nominated
2015	Carl Prisen	Most Played Song of the Year	"Happy Home"	Won
2015	Danish DeeJay Awards	Danish Urban Release of the Year	"Twerk It Like Miley"	Won
2015	Danish DeeJay Awards	Dancechart.dk Award	"Twerk It Like Miley"	Won
2015	Danish DeeJay Awards	Remix of the Year	"Frk. Escobar (Flamboyant Remix"	Won
2015	Danish DeeJay Awards	Danish DeeJay Favourite of the Year	"Twerk It Like Miley"	Won
2015	Danish DeeJay Awards	Producer of the Year	Hedegaard	Nominated
2015	Zulu Awards	Hit of the Year	"Happy Home"	Nominated
2016	Danish DeeJay Awards	People's Choice Award	Hedegaard	Won
2016	Club Awards	Danish Producer of the Year	Hedegaard	Won
2016	Danish Music Awards	Hit of the Year	"Golden"	Nominated
2017	Danish DeeJay Awards	Remix of the Year	"Slem Igen (Hedegaard Remix)"	Won
