= Do Ya (Anthony Jasmin song) =

Single by Anthony Jasmin
- Released: 29 March 2014
- Genre: Pop
- Length: 3:13
- Label: Sony Music Denmark
- Songwriter(s): Engelina Larsen, Ilanguaq Lumholt, Mads Møller, Thor Nørgaard

Anthony Jasmin singles chronology
"Do Ya" (2014)	"Stick Together" (2014)

"Do Ya" is the debut single of the Danish pop duo Anthony Jasmin, winners of the seventh season of the Danish version of X Factor. The English language song was their winners song in the finale of the show on 28 March 2014. The song, immediately released after the results were announced, peaked on the Tracklisten the official Danish Singles Chart at number 1.

== Charts ==
Chart (2014)	Peak position
Denmark (Tracklisten)	1
