= Twerk It Like Miley =

2014 song by Brandon Beal

Single by Brandon Beal featuring Christopher

from the album Truth
- Released: May 5, 2014
- Recorded: 2013
- Genre: EDM
- Length: 3:28
- Label: Universal Music; Then We Take The World
- Songwriters: Brandon Beal; Rasmus Hedegaard; Christopher Nissen
- Producer: Hedegaard

Brandon Beal singles chronology
"Single for the Night" (2014)	"Twerk It Like Miley" (2014)	"Side Bitch Issues" (2014)

Christopher singles chronology
"Waterfall" (2014)	"Twerk It Like Miley" (2014)	"CPH Girls" (2014)

Music video
- "Twerk It Like Miley" on YouTube

"Twerk It Like Miley" (officially on cover as #TwerkItLikeMiley) is a song by American singer Brandon Beal featuring Danish singer Christopher. The song produced by Danish DJ Hedegaard was released on May 5, 2014 on Universal Music Denmark and Then We Take the World, reaching number one on Tracklisten, the official Danish Singles Chart on its first week of release staying there for just one week. The music video directed by Morten Winther also became popular with many references to Miley Cyrus.

== Background ==
The title refers to American singer Miley Cyrus and her twerking incident when in March 2013, she posted a video on Facebook which featured her performing a twerking routine while wearing a unicorn suit, to the 2011 single "Wop" by J. Dash. Her "Wop" video would go to become viral and create a lot of controversy and parodies.

The song lyrics refers to this actual video as Brandon Beal asks from his girl to behave like Miley in that video: "I know, you wore them jeans so I can see that thong [repeat] / So pop it like Miley / and don't forget that tongue [repeat] / So when the beat beat beat beat drop, get your ass on the floor / Start twerking like Miley".

== Charts ==
=== Weekly charts ===
Chart (2014)	Peak position
Denmark (Tracklisten)	1
Germany (GfK)	95

=== Year-end charts ===
Chart (2014)	Position
Denmark (Tracklisten)	9

== Certifications ==
Region	Certification	Certified units/sales
Germany (BVMI)	Gold	150,000^{‡}
Streaming
Denmark (IFPI Danmark)	3× Platinum	7,800,000^{†}
^{^} Shipments figures based on certification alone.^{‡} Sales+streaming figures based on certification alone.^{†} Streaming-only figures based on certification alone.
