= Christopher (singer) =

Danish singer

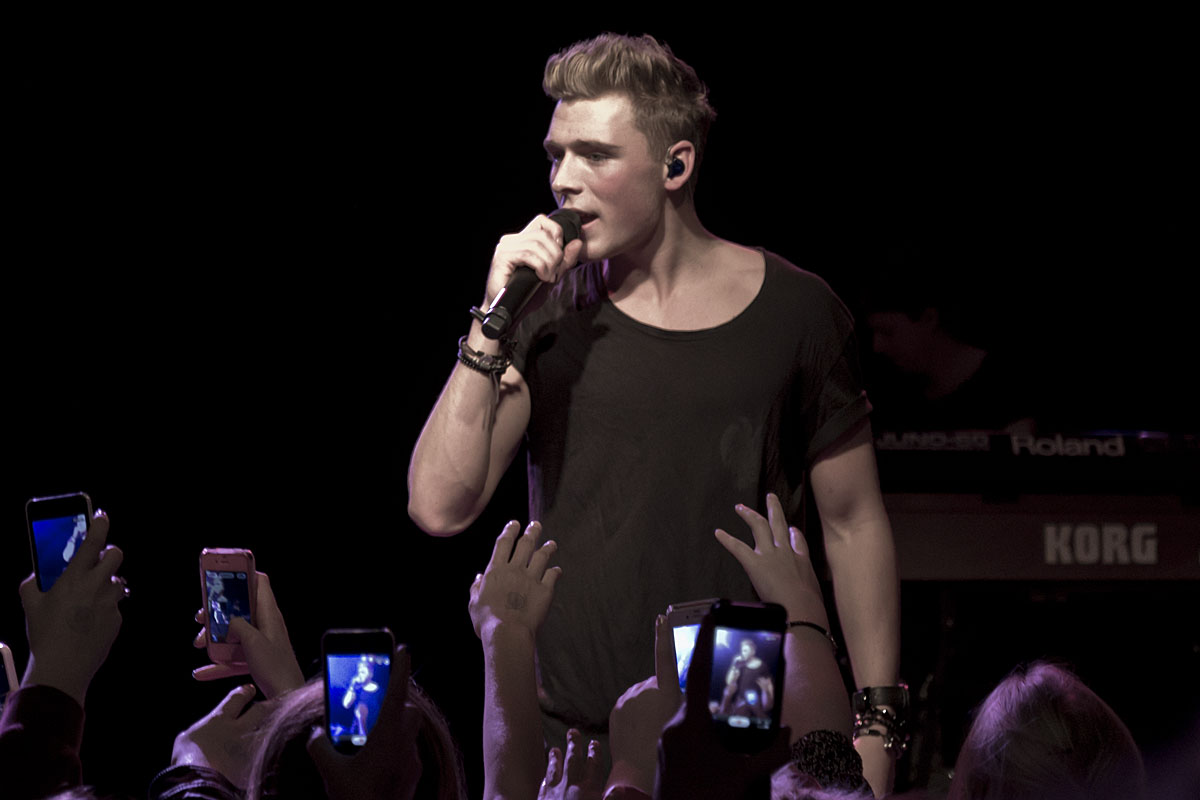
- Christopher performing in 2012

Background information
- Born: Christopher Lund Nissen; 31 January 1992 (age 34); Frederiksberg, Capital Region, Denmark
- Genre: Pop
- Occupations: Singer, songwriter
- Instruments: Vocals, guitar, piano
- Years active: 2011 – present
- Labels: EMI Denmark, Parlophone, Warner Music Denmark
- Website: christophermusic.dk

Christopher Lund Nissen (Danish pronunciation: [kʰʁiˈstʌfɐ ˈlɔnˀ ˈne̝sn̩]; born 31 January 1992) is a Danish singer from Copenhagen, signed to EMI Denmark. In November 2012, he won an award at the Danish Music Awards 2012. He was awarded New Thinker of the Year (Årets nytænker), given by Spotify as an innovation prize. Christopher has released five albums, the debut Colours (2012), followed by Told You So (2014), Closer (2016), Under the Surface (2019) and My Blood (2021). Christopher's songs include "Against the Odds", "Nothing in Common", "Told You So", "CPH Girls" and "I Won't Let You Down".

== Career ==
Christopher started singing covers of other singers' songs. His debut single was "Against the Odds", co-written by Kay & Ndustry, Kasper Larsen, Ole Brodersen, Curtis Richa and Johan Wetterberg, and produced by Kay & Ndustry and GL Music's Lasse Lindorff. It was released in September 2011, reaching number 23 on the Danish Singles Chart. The accompanying music video is directed by Nicolas Tobias Følsgaard and Jonas Lodahl Andersen. His follow-up single "Nothing in Common" entered the Danish Singles Chart at number 5 in 2012. His debut album Colours was released in 2013. Christopher's third studio album Closer was released on 15 April 2016. "I Won't Let You Down" featuring Bekuh Boom become a number 1 in Denmark and the track "Limousine" with the artist Madcon.

== Personal life ==
He was born in Frederiksberg, but later moved to Amager, Denmark with his parents and younger brother Oliver. In 2012 Christopher moved in with his girlfriend, Danish singer Medina. The couple later split up. In 2014, he began a relationship with Danish model Cecilie Haugaard. The couple married in June 2019. The pair welcomed their first child, a daughter named Noelle, in 2021. In 2023, Haugaard gave birth to the couple's second child, a daughter.

== Discography ==
=== Albums ===
==== Studio albums ====
| Title | Details | Peak chart positions | | Certifications |
| Title | Details | DEN | KOR | Certifications |
|---|---|---|---|---|
| Colours | Released: 19 March 2012; Label: EMI; Format: CD, digital download | 4 | — | IFPI DEN: Platinum |
| Told You So | Released: 24 March 2014; Label: Parlophone; Format: CD, digital download | 2 | — | IFPI: 2× Platinum |
| Closer | Released: 15 April 2016; Label: Parlophone; Format: CD, digital download | 1 | 74 | IFPI: Platinum |
| Under the Surface | Released: 22 February 2019; Label: Parlophone; Format: CD, digital download | 5 | — | IFPI: Platinum |
| My Blood | Released: 26 March 2021; Label: Parlophone; Format: CD, digital download | 20 | — | IFPI: Gold |
| Fools Gold | Released: 2 May 2025; Label: Warner Music Denmark; Format: CD, digital download | 6 | — | IFPI: Gold |

==== Soundtrack albums ====
| Title | Details | Peak chart positions | Certifications |
| Title | Details | DEN | Certifications |
|---|---|---|---|
| A Beautiful Life | Released: 2 June 2023; Label: Parlophone, Warner Music Denmark; Format: digital download | 1 | IFPI: Platinum |
| A Beautiful Real Life | Released: 29 August 2025; Label: Christopher, Warner Music Denmark; Format: digital download | 18 | |

=== Singles ===
==== As lead artist ====
| Title | Year | Peak chart positions | | | Certifications | Album |
| Title | Year | DEN | KOR | SWE | Certifications | Album |
|---|---|---|---|---|---|---|
| "Against the Odds" | 2011 | 23 | — | — | IFPI: Gold | Colours |
| "Nothing in Common" | 2012 | 5 | — | — | IFPI: Platinum | Colours |
| "Mine, Mine, Mine" | 2012 | — | — | — | IFPI: Platinum | Colours |
| "Colours" (featuring Frida Amundsen) | 2012 | 19 | — | — | IFPI: Gold | Colours |
| "We Should Be" (demo) | 2013 | 15 | — | — | | Told You So (bonus track) |
| "Told You So" | 2013 | 4 | — | — | IFPI: 2× Platinum | Told You So |
| "Crazy" | 2014 | 2 | — | — | IFPI: Platinum | Told You So |
| "Mama" | 2014 | 9 | — | — | IFPI: Gold | Told You So |
| "Waterfall" | 2014 | 13 | — | — | | Told You So |
| "CPH Girls" (featuring Brandon Beal) | 2014 | 1 | — | — | IFPI: 2× Platinum | Told You So (Deluxe) |
| "Tulips" | 2015 | 4 | — | — | IFPI: Platinum | Closer |
| "Christopher" | 2015 | 39 | — | — | | Non-album single |
| "Limousine" (featuring Madcon) | 2016 | — | — | 69 | IFPI: Gold | Closer |
| "I Won't Let You Down" (featuring Bekuh Boom) | 2016 | 1 | — | — | IFPI: 2× Platinum | Closer |
| "Take Me Back" (with Matoma) | 2016 | 16 | — | — | IFPI: Gold | Closer (2017 version) |
| "Heartbeat" | 2016 | 26 | — | — | IFPI: Platinum | Closer |
| "Free Fall" | 2016 | 13 | — | — | IFPI: Gold | Closer (2017 version) |
| "Naked" | 2017 | 35 | — | — | IFPI: Gold | Closer (2017 version) |
| "Bad" | 2018 | 10 | 118 | — (Note: "Bad" did not enter the Swedish Singellista Chart, but peaked at number 18 on the Swedish Heatseeker Chart.) | IFPI: Platinum; KMCA: Platinum | Under the Surface |
| "Monogamy" | 2018 | 33 | — | — | IFPI: Gold | Under the Surface |
| "Irony" | 2018 | 7 | — | — | IFPI: 2× Platinum | Under the Surface |
| "My Heart" | 2019 | 18 | — | — | IFPI: Platinum | Under the Surface |
| "Real Life" | 2019 | 30 | — | — | IFPI: Gold | Under the Surface (physical edition) |
| "Ghost" | 2020 | 17 | — | — | IFPI: 2× Platinum | My Blood |
| "Leap of Faith" | 2020 | 15 | — | — | IFPI: Platinum | My Blood |
| "Bad Boy" (with Chungha) | 2020 | — | 31 | — | | Non-album single |
| "Good to Goodbye" (featuring Clara Mae) | 2021 | 39 | — | — | IFPI: Platinum | My Blood |
| "Fall So Hard" | 2021 | 31 | — | — | IFPI: Platinum | My Blood |
| "If It Weren't for You" | 2021 | 30 | — | — | IFPI: Gold | Non-album singles |
| "When I Get Old" (with Chungha) | 2022 | — | — | — | IFPI: Gold | Non-album singles |
| "Hope This Song Is for You" | 2023 | 5 | — | — | IFPI: Gold | A Beautiful Life |
| "Valdes jul" | 2023 | 6 | — | — | IFPI: Platinium | Non-album single |
| "One" | 2024 | — | — | — | | Fools Gold |
| "It Could Have Been Us" (featuring Griff) | 2024 | — | — | — | | Fools Gold |
| "Trouble" (with Lee Young Ji) | 2024 | — | — | — | | Fools Gold |
| "Lose a You" | 2025 | — | — | — | | Fools Gold |
| "Permanent Scars" | 2025 | — | — | — | | Fools Gold |
| "Hvor var jeg endt" (with Thor Farlov) | 2025 | 7 | — | — | IFPI: Platinum | Non-album single |
| "Orbit" | 2025 | 23 | — | — | IFPI: Platinum | Fools Gold |
| "When We Were Young" | 2025 | — | — | — | | A Beautiful Real Life |
| "Ham med guitaren" | 2026 | 2 | — | — | IFPI: Platinum | Non-album singles |
| "Ringer om natten" | 2026 | 1 | — | — | IFPI: Gold | Non-album singles |
| "Jeg ka' ik' mærke noget" (featuring Thomas Helmig) | 2026 | 5 | — | — | | Non-album singles |
| "Elsker dig så meget jeg ku' gå i stykke" | 2026 | 1 | — | — | | Non-album singles |
| "Larger Than Life" (featuring Benjamin Hav) | 2026 | 3 | — | — | | Non-album singles |
| "Aldrig Igen" | 2026 | — | — | — | | Non-album singles |

==== As a featured artist ====
| Title | Year | Peak chart positions | | Certifications | Album |
| Title | Year | DEN | GER | Certifications | Album |
|---|---|---|---|---|---|
| "Where Do We Go from Here" (Svenstrup & Vendelboe featuring Christopher) | 2012 | 2 | — | IFPI: 2× Platinum | Svenstrup & Vendelboe |
| "Twerk It Like Miley" (Brandon Beal featuring Christopher) | 2014 | 1 | 95 | IFPI: 3× Platinum | Truth |
| "Tror Kun På Én Hjulemand" (Natholdet featuring Christopher) | 2022 | — | — | | Non-album single |
| "My Only Hope" (Jubël featuring Christopher) | 2022 | — | — | | Non-album single |
| "Tell My Friends" (Kita Alexander featuring Christopher) | 2026 | — | — | | Rage |

=== Other charted songs ===
| Title | Year | Peak chart positions | Certifications | Album |
| Title | Year | DEN | Certifications | Album |
|---|---|---|---|---|
| "Nympho" | 2014 | — | IFPI: Gold | Told You So |
| "First Like" (live) | 2014 | 34 | IFPI: Platinum | Told You So (Deluxe) |
| "A Beautiful Life" | 2023 | 10 | IFPI:Platinum | A Beautiful Life |
| "Honey, I'm So High" | 2023 | 22 | IFPI:Gold | A Beautiful Life |
| "Led Me to You" | 2023 | 27 | IFPI:Gold | A Beautiful Life |

=== Guest appearances ===
| Title | Year | Other artist | Album |
|---|---|---|---|
| "A Little Forgiveness" | 2012 | Molly Sandén | Unchained |
| "Horizon" | 2014 | Anna Abreu | V |
| "Moments" | 2019 | - | At Eighteen |

== Filmography ==
- Haps du er fanget (2012)
- GO' Morgen Danmark (2012, 2013, 2014, 2015, 2016)
- Danish Music Awards (2012, 2013, 2014, 2015)
- X Factor (2014, 2016)
- Jeg er Christopher (2014)
- Natholdet (2014, 2015)
- Aftenshowet (2014)
- Danmarksindsamling (2016)
- Vi ses hos Celment (2016)
- Akademi Fantasia (2016) – Malaysia Guest artist (Week 5)
- Toscana
- A Beautiful Life (2023)

== Awards ==
- Danish Music Awards Årets Nytænker 2012
- The voice Årets Flirt 2012
- The voice The Body Art 2012
- The voice Årets Instagrammer 2013
- Gaffa-prisen Årets Mandlige Kunstner 2014
- Danish Music Awards Publikumsprisen 2014
- Danish Music Awards Årets Danske popudgivelsen 2014
- MTV Europe Music Awards for årets danske band 2014
- The voice Årets Trendsætter 2014
- The Voice Årets Idol 2014
- Danish Music Awards Årets Danske Club Navn 2014
- Zulu Awards Årets Mandlige Kunstner 2015
- The voice-pris 2015
- 2 The voice prize 2017

== Tours ==
- Colours Tour 2012–2013
- Christopher Tour 2013
- Told you So Tour 2014–2015
- Tulips Tour 2015
- Closer Tour 2016
- Europe Tour 2020
- Korea Tour 2022
