= The Mountains =

Danish electronic music trio

- Origin: Denmark
- Genres: Synth-pop
- Years active: 2013–present
- Labels: Warner Music Denmark
- Members: Michael Møller; Fridolin Nordsø; Frederik Nordsø

The Mountains are a Danish electronic trio made up of Michael Møller and the twins Fridolin and Frederik Nordsø, who joined forces to form a synth-pop and electronic music band. The band is signed to Warner Music Denmark and their debut album, titled The Mountains, the Valleys, the Lakes, was released on 10 March 2014. Two singles were released from the album: "The Mountains" and "The Valleys".

"The Valleys" was featured on the FIFA 15 soundtrack.

== Members ==
The trio have had earlier musical success. The twin brothers Fridolin and Frederik Nordsø were members of the William Blakes, a Danish pop/rock group formed in 2006 that also included Kristian Leth and Bo Rande. They are also record producers who have worked with many artists, including Burhan G, Brandy, and Fallulah.

Michael Møller was part of moi Caprice, a Danish indie rock group that also included David Brunsgaard, Jakob Millung, Casper Henning Hansen, and earlier Christian Hillesø.

== Discography ==
- The Mountains, the Valleys, the Lakes (2014)
- When We Were Kings (2016)
- Before and After Hollywood (2020)
