= Brandon Beal =

Danish-American singer, songwriter and producer

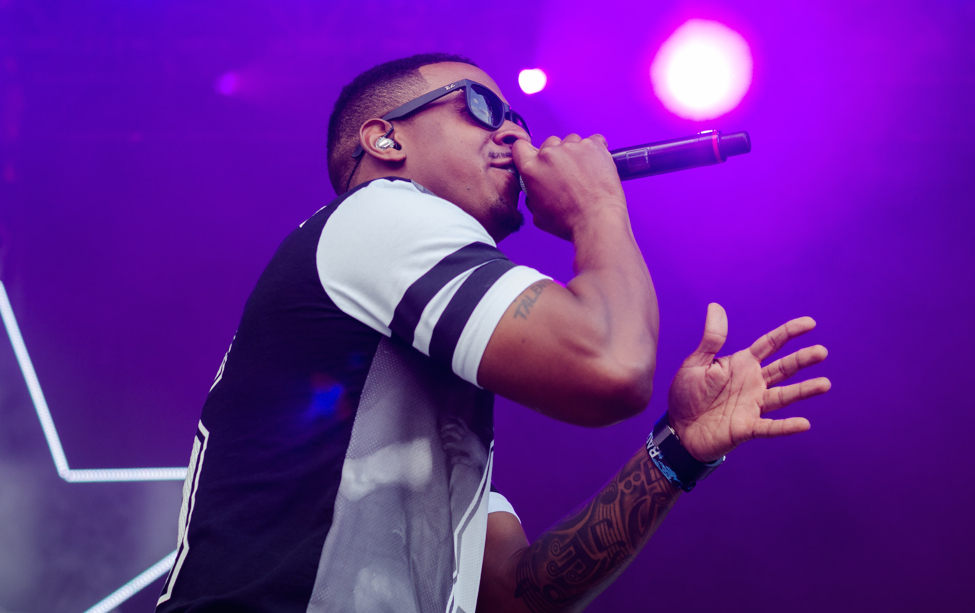
- Beal performing at Smukfest Copenhagen 2014

Background information
- Born: December 16, 1983 (age 42); Tyler, Texas, U.S.
- Genres: R&B; pop; hip hop
- Occupations: Singer; songwriter; record producer
- Years active: 2004–present
- Labels: Universal Music, Then We Take The World
- Website: brandonbeal.net

Brandon O'Bryant Beal (born December 16, 1983) is an American singer, songwriter, and record producer based in Denmark. He is best known for his 2014 single Twerk It Like Miley (featuring Christopher), which topped the Danish Singles Chart and went viral internationally through the app Dubsmash. Beal also reached number 1 in Denmark with "Golden" (featuring Lukas Graham) in 2016, and was featured on Christopher's chart-topping single CPH Girls.

As a songwriter, Beal has contributed to all of Lukas Graham’s albums and co-wrote their 2012 hit Better Than Yourself (Criminal Mind Pt. 2) which debuted at number 1 in Denmark. He has also worked with international artists including Snoop Dogg, Flo Rida, and 6ix9ine, in addition to frequent collaborations with DJ Hedegaard.

== Career ==
Beal released his first album, Comfortable, in 2006, a collaboration with Danish-American producer Multiman. He gained wider recognition in Denmark after teaming up with Rasmus Hedegaard as the duo Beal & Ras, who toured with Kato and Ida Corr in 2011. Their debut single, "Money," spent 14 weeks on the Danish Dance Chart and peaked at number 13.

He appeared on Kato’s "My House 2.0," which reached number 40 in Denmark, and was also featured on Kato’s single "Never Let U Go" alongside Snoop Dogg, which entered Hitlisten at number 2.

As a songwriter, Beal earned his first Danish chart-topper in 2012 with "Better Than Yourself (Criminal Mind Pt. 2)", co-written for Lukas Graham, which debuted at number 1 on Hitlisten.

Two years later, Beal achieved international attention with Twerk It Like Miley, produced by Hedegaard and featuring Christopher. The single went to number 1 in Denmark and later won the Danish Music Award for "Club Hit of the Year". He also appeared on Christopher’s hit "CPH Girls," which reached number 1 on Hitlisten.

Beal scored another number 1 in 2016 with "Golden", a collaboration with Lukas Graham. That same year he co-wrote Christopher’s "I Won’t Let You Down," which also reached number 1, and contributed to Lukas Graham’s "Strip No More," another Danish number 1 single.

His writing credits also include Christopher’s "Free Fall," which peaked at number 13, Lukas Graham’s "Lullaby," which reached number 3 in 2018, and Jimilian's "Kick" (featuring 6ix9ine), which peaked at number 2.

In 2021, Beal co-wrote "No Evil" by Branco featuring Lukas Graham, which debuted at number 1 in Denmark. More recently, he co-wrote "Beijing Baby", released in 2023 by Hedegaard & CANCUN?, which went to number 1 on the QQ Music Chart in China.

== Albums ==
Year	Title	Peak position (DEN)	Ref
2008	Comfortable	—	—
2016	Truth	34	
2022	Pink Café	55	

== Singles ==
Year	Single	Peak positions				Album	Certification
Year	Single	BEL (Fl)	AUT	DEN	SWE	Album	Certification
2014	"Single for the Night"	45 (Ultratip)	—	13 (Dance)	—	Non-album single	
2014	"Twerk It Like Miley" (featuring Christopher)	—	—	1	—	Truth	* IFPI: 3× Platinum
2014	"Side Bitch Issues"	—	—	21	—	Truth	Gold
2016	"Golden" (featuring Lukas Graham)	—	64	1	55	Truth	* DEN: 3× Platinum
2017	"Paradise" (with Olivia Holt)	—	—	39	—	—	
2018	"EX" (featuring Jimilian)	—	—	—	—	—	

== Songs as a featured artist ==
Year	Single	Peak positions	Album	Certification
Year	Single	DEN	Album	Certification
2011	"My House 2.0" (Kato featuring Brandon Beal & Negash Ali)	40	Kato album Discolized 2.0	—
2012	"Never Let U Go" (Kato featuring Snoop Dogg & Brandon Beal)	2	Kato album Behind Closed Doors	—
2014	"CPH Girls" (Christopher featuring Brandon jr)	1	Christopher album Told You So	* IFPI: 2× Platinum
2015	"Smile & Wave" (Hedegaard featuring Brandon Beal)	12	—	Platinum
2015	"With You" (De Fam featuring Brandon Beal)	—	—	—
2017	"Bad Attitude" (Lågsus P3 featuring Brandon Beal)	—	—	—

== Charting songs written and produced by Brandon Beal ==
Year	Single	Artist	Peak position (DK)	Album	Ref
2012	"Better Than Yourself (Criminal Mind Pt. 2)"	Lukas Graham	1	Lukas Graham	
2013	"Stop! Dans!"	Nik & Jay	35	United	
2014	"Told You So"	Christopher	2	Told You So	
2014	"Crazy"	Christopher	2	Told You So	
2014	"Now"	Kato & Mads Langer	33	Now	
2015	"Strip No More"	Lukas Graham	1	Lukas Graham (Blue Album)	
2015	"Hayo"	Lukas Graham	17	Lukas Graham (Blue Album)	
2016	"I Won’t Let You Down" (feat. Bekuh BOOM)	Christopher	1	Closer	
2016	"Free Fall"	Christopher	13	Closer	
2016	"Giv Mig Noget"	Jimilian	11	—	
2016	Painkillers (album)	Patrick Dorgan	29	Painkillers	
2016	"Going Home" (feat. Nabiha & Patrick Dorgan)	Hedegaard	28	—	
2018	"Monogamy"	Christopher	14	Under the Surface	
2018	"Kick" (feat. 6ix9ine)	Jimilian	2	—	
2018	"Lullaby"	Lukas Graham	3	3 (The Purple Album)	
2020	"Where I’m From" (feat. Wiz Khalifa)	Lukas Graham	24	—	
2021	"Call My Name"	Lukas Graham	33	—	
2021	"No Evil" (feat. Lukas Graham)	Branco	1	—	
2022	"All of It All"	Lukas Graham	29	4 (The Pink Album)	
2023	"Beijing Baby"	Hedegaard & CANCUN?	—	1 (QQ Music EDM)	—

== Awards and nominations ==
Year	Award	Category	Nominee	Result
2016	Zulu Awards	New Artist of the Year	Brandon Beal	Nominated
2016	Danish Deejay Awards	Peoples Choice Award	"Smile And Wave	Won
2016	Danish Deejay Awards	Hit of the Year	"Golden"	Nominated
2015	Danish Deejay Awards	Danish Deejay Favorite	"Twerk It Like Miley"	Won
2015	Danish Deejay Awards	Danish Urban Release of the Year	"Twerk It Like Miley"	Won
2015	Danish Deejay Awards	Dancechart.dk Award	"Twerk It Like Miley"	Won
2015	Danish Music Awards	Hit of the Year	"CPH Girls"	Nominated
2014	Danish Music Awards	Pop Release of the Year	"Told You So"	Nominated
2014	Danish Music Awards	Writer of the Year	"Told You So"	Nominated
2014	Danish Music Awards	Album Release of the Year	"Told You So"	Nominated
2014	Danish Music Awards	Hit of the Year	"Twerk It Like Miley"	Nominated
2014	Danish Music Awards	Producer of the Year	"Happy Home"	Won
2014	Danish Music Awards	Clubhit of the Year	"Twerk It Like Miley"	Won
2013	Danish Music Awards	Hit of the Year	"Better Than Yourself (Criminal Mind pt. 2)	Nominated
