= Lukas Graham discography =

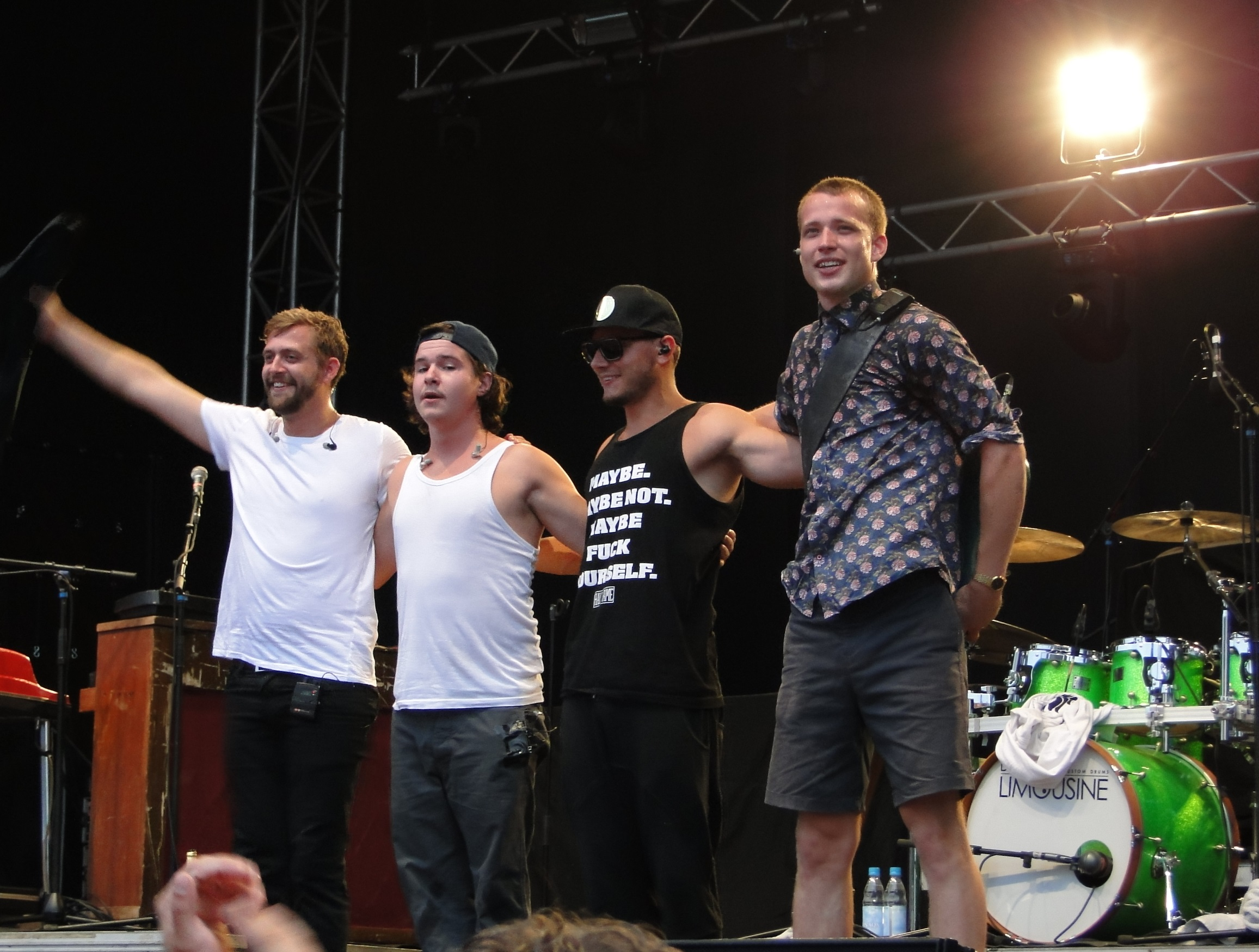
- Lukas Graham in Dresden in 2013
- Studio albums: 5
- EPs: 2
- Singles: 31
- Promotional singles: 4
- Music videos: 12

The discography of Lukas Graham, a Danish soul pop band, consists of five studio albums, two extended plays, thirty-one singles, four promotional singles, twelve music videos and other album appearances. Releasing their debut album in 2012 with Copenhagen Records, which includes charting songs such as "Drunk in the Morning" and "Criminal Mind", Lukas Graham quickly became the most popular live act in Denmark. That success translated to the rest of Europe and caught the attention of Warner Bros. Records who co-signed them in 2013. The band's music was first introduced worldwide with the release of their second album in 2015, along with the release of two of its singles, "7 Years" and "Mama Said", with the former becoming their biggest hit single to date.

In 2018, Lukas Graham released their third album 3 (The Purple Album), featuring the singles "Love Someone" and "Not a Damn Thing Changed", with the former debuting at number 1 on the Danish charts and being certified platinum multiple times in Denmark, the United States, and Australia. In 2023, the band released their fourth album, 4 (The Pink Album), with two of its singles, "Lie" and "Share That Love", both being certified two-times platinum in Denmark. In 2026, the band released their fifth album, Good Times, which debuted at number 1 on the Danish album charts.

== Studio albums ==
List of studio albums, with selected chart positions and certifications
Title	Details	Peak chart positions										Certifications
Title	Details	DEN	AUS	AUT	GER	NOR	NZ	SWE	SWI	UK	US	Certifications
Lukas Graham	Released: 26 March 2012; Label: Copenhagen; Formats: CD, LP, digital download	1	—	—	41	—	—	—	—	—	—	DEN: 7× Platinum
Lukas Graham (Blue Album)	Released: 17 June 2015; Label: Copenhagen, Then We Take The World, Warner; Formats: CD, LP, digital download, streaming	1	1	31	28	15	2	3	34	2	3	DEN: 18× Platinum; GLF: Platinum; MC: Platinum; BPI: Gold; RIAA: Platinum
3 (The Purple Album)	Released: 26 October 2018; Label: Copenhagen, Then We Take The World, Warner; Formats: CD, LP, digital download, streaming	1	— (Note: 3 (The Purple Album) did not enter the ARIA Albums Chart, but peaked at number 31 on the ARIA Digital Albums Chart.)	—	57	2	—	3	85	—	89	DEN: 4× Platinum; GLF: Gold
4 (The Pink Album)	Released: 20 January 2023; Label: Copenhagen, Then We Take The World, Warner; Formats: CD, LP, digital download, streaming	1	—	—	56	—	—	—	—	—	—	IFPI DEN: Platinum
Good Times	Released: 14 August 2026; Label: Universal; Formats: CD, LP, digital download, streaming	1	—	—	—	—	—	—	—	—	—	
"—" denotes a recording that did not chart or was not released in that territory.

== Extended plays ==
List of extended plays
Title	Details
Spotify Sessions	Released: 27 May 2016; Label: Copenhagen, Then We Take The World, Warner; Formats: Digital download, streaming
Apple Music Home Session: Lukas Graham	Released: 6 January 2023; Label: Copenhagen, Then We Take The World, Warner; Formats: Digital download, streaming

== Singles ==
=== As lead artist ===
List of singles as lead artist, with selected chart positions and certifications, showing year released and album name
Title	Year	Peak chart positions										Certifications	Album
Title	Year	DEN	AUS	AUT	GER	NL	NOR	NZ	SWE	UK	US	Certifications	Album
"Ordinary Things"	2011	2	—	—	—	—	—	—	—	—	—	DEN: 3× Platinum	Lukas Graham
"Drunk in the Morning"	2012	1	—	42	30	—	—	—	—	127	—	DEN: 4× Platinum	Lukas Graham
"Criminal Mind"	2012	4	—	—	—	—	—	—	—	—	—	DEN: 2× Platinum	Lukas Graham
"Better Than Yourself (Criminal Mind Pt 2)"	2012	1	—	—	—	—	—	—	—	—	—	DEN: 3× Platinum	Lukas Graham
"Mama Said"	2014	1	42	—	—	—	3	29	13	48	36	DEN: 4× Platinum; GLF: 3× Platinum; BPI: Gold; RIAA: 2× Platinum; MC: Platinum; RMNZ: Platinum	Lukas Graham (Blue Album)
"Strip No More"	2015	1	—	—	—	—	—	—	—	—	—	DEN: 3× Platinum	Lukas Graham (Blue Album)
"7 Years"	2015	1	1	1	6	1	4	1	1	1	2	DEN: 8× Platinum; ARIA: 6× Platinum; BPI: 6× Platinum; GLF: 3× Platinum; MC: Diamond; RIAA: 12× Platinum; RMNZ: 8× Platinum; IFPI AUT: Gold	Lukas Graham (Blue Album)
"You're Not There"	2016	25	—	—	—	—	—	—	—	—	— (Note: "You're Not There" did not enter the US Billboard Hot 100, but peaked at number 25 on the Bubbling Under Hot 100 chart.)	DEN: 3× Platinum	Lukas Graham (Blue Album)
"Take the World by Storm"	2016	10	—	—	—	—	—	—	—	—	—	DEN: 2× Platinum	Lukas Graham (Blue Album)
"Off to See the World"	2017	9	—	—	—	—	—	—	—	—	—	IFPI DEN: Platinum	My Little Pony: The Movie
"Love Someone"	2018	1	20	29	33	62	5	27	8	—	70	IFPI DEN: 5× Platinum; RIAA: 2× Platinum; ARIA: 3× Platinum; BPI: Gold; RMNZ: 3× Platinum	3 (The Purple Album)
"Not a Damn Thing Changed"	2018	2	—	—	—	—	—	—	— (Note: "Not a Damn Thing Changed" did not enter the Swedish Singellista Chart, but peaked at number 16 on the Swedish Heatseeker Chart.)	—	—	IFPI DEN: Platinum	3 (The Purple Album)
"Lie"	2019	2	—	—	—	—	—	— (Note: "Lie" did not enter the NZ Top 40 Singles Chart, but peaked at number 22 on the NZ Hot Singles Chart.)	— (Note: "Lie" did not enter the Swedish Singellista Chart, but peaked at number eight on the Swedish Heatseeker Chart.)	—	—	IFPI DEN: 2× Platinum	4 (The Pink Album)
"Here (For Christmas)"	2019	23	—	66	63	—	—	—	— (Note: "Here (For Christmas)" did not enter the Swedish Singellista Chart, but peaked at number three on the Swedish Heatseeker Chart.)	—	—	IFPI DEN: Platinum	Non-album singles
"Scars"	2020	9	—	—	—	—	—	— (Note: "Scars" did not enter the NZ Top 40 Singles Chart, but peaked at number 26 on the NZ Hot Singles Chart.)	— (Note: "Scars" did not enter the Swedish Singellista Chart, but peaked at number three on the Swedish Heatseeker Chart.)	—	—	IFPI DEN: Gold	Non-album singles
"Love Songs"	2020	—	—	—	—	—	—	—	—	—	—		Non-album singles
"Share That Love" (featuring G-Eazy)	2020	14	—	—	—	—	—	— (Note: "Share That Love" did not enter the NZ Top 40 Singles Chart, but peaked at number 23 on the NZ Hot Singles Chart.)	32	—	—	IFPI DEN: 2× Platinum; RMNZ: Gold	4 (The Pink Album)
"Where I'm From" (featuring Wiz Khalifa)	2020	24	—	—	—	—	—	—	84	—	—		Non-album single
"No Evil" (with Branco)	2021	1	—	—	—	—	—	—	—	—	—	IFPI DEN: Gold	Baba Business
"Happy for You"	2021	30	—	—	—	—	—	— (Note: "Happy for You" did not enter the NZ Top 40 Singles Chart, but peaked at number 36 on the NZ Hot Singles Chart.)	— (Note: "Happy for You" did not enter the Swedish Singellista Chart, but peaked at number 13 on the Swedish Heatseeker Chart.)	—	—	IFPI DEN: Gold	Non-album singles
"Call My Name"	2021	33	—	—	—	—	—	—	— (Note: "Call My Name" did not enter the Swedish Singellista Chart, but peaked at number six on the Swedish Heatseeker Chart.)	—	—	IFPI DEN: Gold	Non-album singles
"Most People" (with R3hab)	2021	—	—	—	—	—	—	— (Note: "Most People" did not enter the NZ Top 40 Singles Chart, but peaked at number 38 on the NZ Hot Singles Chart.)	— (Note: "Most People" did not enter the Swedish Singellista Chart, but peaked at number six on the Swedish Heatseeker Chart.)	—	—		Non-album singles
"All of It All"	2022	29	—	—	—	—	—	— (Note: "All of It All" did not enter the NZ Top 40 Singles Chart, but peaked at number 28 on the NZ Hot Singles Chart.)	—	—	—		4 (The Pink Album)
"Wish You Were Here" (with Khalid)	2022	10	—	—	—	—	—	— (Note: "Wish You Were Here" did not enter the NZ Top 40 Singles Chart, but peaked at number seven on the NZ Hot Singles Chart.)	27	—	—	IFPI DEN: Platinum	4 (The Pink Album)
"Home Movies" (with Mickey Guyton)	2023	37	—	—	—	—	—	—	—	—	—	IFPI DEN: Gold	4 (The Pink Album)
"Cheat Code"	2024	—	—	—	—	—	—	—	—	—	— (Note: "Cheat Code" did not enter the US Billboard Hot 100, but peaked at number 23 on the Adult Pop Airplay chart.)		Non-album singles
"You You You"	2025	—	—	—	—	—	—	—	—	—	—		Non-album singles
"To Know a Girl"	2026	— (Note: "To Know a Girl" did not enter the Track Top-40 chart, but peaked at number 19 on the Airplay Top-20 chart.)	—	—	—	—	—	—	—	—	—		Good Times
"Second Chance"	2026	—	—	—	—	—	—	—	—	—	—		Good Times
"Good Times"	2026	—	—	—	—	—	—	—	—	—	—		Good Times
"Before You Go"	2026	28	—	—	—	—	—	—	—	—	—		Good Times
"—" denotes a single that did not chart or was not released in that territory.

=== As featured artist ===
List of singles as featured artist, with selected chart positions and certifications, showing year released and album name
Title	Year	Peak chart positions					Certifications	Album
Title	Year	DEN	AUT	GER	NOR	SWE	Certifications	Album
"Happy Home" (Hedegaard featuring Lukas Graham)	2014	1	—	—	4	40	DEN: 3× Platinum; GLF: Platinum	Non-album singles
"Søndagsbarn" (Suspekt featuring Lukas Graham)	2015	3	—	—	—	—	DEN: Platinum	Non-album singles
"Golden" (Brandon Beal featuring Lukas Graham)	2016	1	64	46	27	55	DEN: 3× Platinum; NOR: Platinum; GLF: Gold	Truth
"Holder Fast" (Hennedub featuring Gilli and Lukas Graham)	2018	1	—	—	—	—	DEN: 2× Platinum	Non-album singles
"Tættere end vi tror" (P3 featuring Tessa, Lukas Graham, Mads Langer, Jada, Benjamin Hav, Clara and Don Stefano)	2020	1	—	—	—	—	DEN: Platinum	Non-album singles
"Too Late" (Cash Cash featuring Wiz Khalifa and Lukas Graham)	2021	—	—	—	—	—		Say It Like You Feel It
"Love You Right" (Walk off the Earth featuring Lukas Graham)	2021	—	—	—	—	—		Meet You There
"Du ligner din mor" (Benjamin Hav featuring Lukas Graham)	2024	1	—	—	—	—	DEN: 3× Platinum	Non-album single
"—" denotes a single that did not chart or was not released in that territory.

=== Promotional singles ===
List of promotional singles, with selected chart positions and certifications, showing year released and album name
Title	Year	Certifications	Album
"Don't Hurt Me This Way"	2013	DEN: Platinum	Lukas Graham
"Love Someone" (featuring Sabina Ddumba)	2019		Non-album promotional singles
"Last Christmas"	2022		Non-album promotional singles
"Fever" (Kygo featuring Lukas Graham)	2022		Thrill of the Chase

== Other charted songs ==
List of songs, with selected chart positions, showing year released and album name
Title	Year	Peak chart positions	Album
Title	Year	DEN	Album
"What Happened to Perfect"	2015	14	Lukas Graham (Blue Album)
"Hayo"	2015	17	Lukas Graham (Blue Album)
"Don't You Worry 'bout Me"	2015	24	Lukas Graham (Blue Album)
"Funeral"	2015	29	Lukas Graham (Blue Album)
"When I Woke Up..."	2015	30	Lukas Graham (Blue Album)
"Happy Home"	2015	31	Lukas Graham (Blue Album)
"Playtime"	2015	33	Lukas Graham (Blue Album)
"Lullaby"	2018	3	3 (The Purple Album)
"You're Not the Only One (Redemption Song)"	2018	6	3 (The Purple Album)
"Promise"	2018	9	3 (The Purple Album)
"Stick Around"	2018	12	3 (The Purple Album)
"Unhappy"	2018	18	3 (The Purple Album)
"Everything That Isn't Me"	2018	14	3 (The Purple Album)
"Hold My Hand"	2018	21	3 (The Purple Album)
"Say Yes (Church Ballad)"	2018	22	3 (The Purple Album)
