= Good Times (disambiguation) =

Good Times is a 1970s American sitcom.

Good Times or Goodtimes may also refer to:

== Film and television ==
=== Film ===
- Good Times (film), a 1967 film starring Sonny & Cher
- Goodtimes Enterprises, a British film production company
- GoodTimes Entertainment, a home video distributor

=== Television ===
- Good Times (TV channel), an Indian lifestyle channel
- Good Times, a 2015 Chinese television series starring Hu Ge
- Justin Lee Collins: Good Times, a British television chat show

== Literature ==
- The Good Times (short story collection), a 1998 book by James Kelman
- Good Times, a 1969 poetry collection by Lucille Clifton
- Good Times!, a 2009 autobiography by Justin Lee Collins

== Music ==
- Good Times (musical), a 1920 Broadway musical
- Good Times, a sound system founded by DJ Norman Jay

=== Albums ===
- Good Times (Adam Rickitt album) or the title song, 1999
- Good Times (Bagdad Cafe the Trench Town album), 2006
- Good Times (Charlie Robison album) or the title song, 2004
- Good Times (Elvis Presley album), 1974
- Good Times (Kim Dotcom album) or the title song, 2014
- Good Times (Kool & the Gang album) or the title song, 1972
- Good Times (Lukas Graham album), 2026
- Good Times (Shakey Jake album) or the title song, 1960
- Good Times (Shocking Blue album), 1974
- Good Times (Subway album) or the title song, 1995
- Good Times (Willie Nelson album) or the title song, 1968
- Good Times (soundtrack), by Sonny & Cher, or the title song, from the 1967 film
- Good Times!, by the Monkees, 2016
- Good Times: The Very Best of the Hits & the Remixes, by Chic and Sister Sledge, or the title song by Chic (see below), 2005
- The Good Times, by Afroman, 2001
- The Good Times (Neil Sedaka album) or the title song, 1986
- Good Times, by Mando Diao, 2017
- Good Times, by Wanda Jackson, 1980
- The Good Times, by José Hoebee, or the title song, 1982
- Goodtimes, an EP by the Beautiful Girls, 2002

=== Songs ===
==== Singles ====
- "Good Times" (All Time Low song), 2017
- "Good Times" (CDB song), 1997
- "Good Times" (Chic song), 1979
- "Good Times" (Easybeats song), 1968; covered by Jimmy Barnes and INXS (1986) and others
- "Good Times", by Ed Case featuring Skin, 2002
- "Good Times" (Ella Eyre song), 2015
- "Good Times" (Eric Burdon and the Animals song), 1967
- "Good Times" (Finger Eleven song), 2003
- "Good Times", by Ghali, 2020
- "Good Times" (Hoodoo Gurus song), 1987
- "Good Times", by Jerry Butler, 1965
- "Good Times", by Marcy Playground, 2009
- "Good Times" (Roll Deep song), 2010
- "Good Times" (Sam Cooke song), 1964; covered by Dan Seals (1990) and others
- "Good Times" (Styles P song), 2002
- "Good Times" (Tommy Lee song), 2005
- "Good Times (Better Times)", by Cliff Richard, 1969
- "(Gonna Be) Good Times", by Gene Chandler, 1965
- "I Know There's Gonna Be (Good Times)", by Jamie xx, 2015

==== From albums ====
- "Good Times", by Dannii Minogue from Club Disco, 2007
- "Good Times", by Edie Brickell from Picture Perfect Morning, 1994
- "Good Times", by Ex Hex from It's Real, 2019
- "Good Times", by Harry Nilsson from Spotlight on Nilsson, 1966
- "Good Times", by the Jacksons from The Jacksons, 1976
- "Good Times", by Krokus from Stampede, 1990
- "Good Times", by Mario from Dancing Shadows, 2018
- "Good Times", by Matt Bianco from Indigo, 1988
- "Good Times", by Michael Fall from Turn On Your Radio, 2013
- "Good Times", by S Club 7 from Sunshine, 2001
- "Good Times", by September from In Orbit, 2005
- "Good Times", by the Stone Roses from Second Coming, 1994
- "Good Times", by Tom Cochrane & Red Rider from Victory Day, 1988
- "Good Times", by Wall of Voodoo from Dark Continent, 1981
- "Good Times", the theme song from the American sitcom, performed by Jim Gilstrap and Blinky, 1974

== Periodicals ==
- Good Times (magazine), a music and entertainment newspaper in Long Island, New York
- Good Times (newspaper), a free-circulation weekly published in Santa Cruz, California
- San Francisco Express Times, published as Good Times from 1969 to 1972, a counterculture tabloid underground newspaper

== Other uses ==
- Goodtimes virus, also referred to as Good Times, an emailed virus hoax
- Good Times Burgers & Frozen Custard, a fast-food chain based in Colorado, US

== See also ==
- Good Time (disambiguation)
- Good Times Bad Times (disambiguation)
- Good Times, Wonderful Times, a 1965 film
