= Where I'm From =

Where I'm From may refer to:

- Where I'm From (Jay-Z song), 1996
- "Where I'm From" (Passion song), 1996
- "Where I'm From" (Jason Michael Carroll song), 2008
- "Where I'm From" (The Reklaws song), 2020
- "Where I'm From" (Lukas Graham song), 2020
- Where I'm From (film), a 2014 National Film Board of Canada documentary by Claude Demers
