= Happy for You =

Single by Lukas Graham
- Released: 14 May 2021
- Length: 3:46
- Label: Warner
- Songwriters: Lukas Forchhammer; Tom Barnes; Pete Kelleher; Ben Kohn; Sam Wish; Sam DeRosa; Morten Ristorp; JP Clark; Joe Kirkland; David LaBrel
- Producer: TMS

Lukas Graham singles chronology
"No Evil" (2021)	"Happy for You" (2021)	"Call My Name" (2021)

"Happy for You" is a song by Danish pop band Lukas Graham. It was released on 14 May 2021 by Warner Records. The song was written by Lukas Forchhammer, TMS, Sam Wish, Sam DeRosa, Morten Ristorp, JP Clark, Joe Kirkland, and David LaBrel. The song peaked at number 30 on the Danish Singles Chart.

== Background ==
In a statement, Lukas Forchhammer says the song is "about the terrible 'what if the worst came to pass', and we weren't together. I'd want you to be happy whatever that entails, and if I didn't want you to be happy, then was it ever real love? Or, was it just infatuation and desire? 'Happy For You' attempts to narrate the broken-heartedness of the breakup, acknowledging the difficulties and the struggle of the one 'left behind'."

== Charts ==
Chart (2021)	Peak position
Denmark (Tracklisten)	30

== Certifications ==
Region	Certification	Certified units/sales
Denmark (IFPI Danmark)	Platinum	90,000^{‡}
^{‡} Sales+streaming figures based on certification alone.

== Release history ==
Release history for "Happy for You"
Region	Date	Format	Label
Denmark	14 May 2021	Digital download; streaming	Warner Records
