= Holder Fast =

Single by Hennedub featuring Gilli & Lukas Graham
- Released: 27 April 2018
- Recorded: 2017
- Genre: R&B; Soul
- Length: 3:12
- Label: Then We Take The World; Universal Denmark
- Songwriter(s): Henrik Bryld Wolsing; Lukas Forchhammer; Kian Rosenberg Larsson
- Producer(s): Hennedub

Hennedub featuring Gilli & Lukas Graham singles chronology
"Holder Fast" (2018)	"Umage" (2018)

Gilli singles chronology
"Colombiana" (2018)	"Holder Fast" (2018)	"Mon p'tit loup" (2018)

Lukas Graham singles chronology
"Off to See the World" (2017)	"Holder Fast" (2018)	"Love Someone" (2018)

"Holder Fast" (English: "Holding On") is a single by Danish Los Angeles–based music producer Hennedub, featuring vocals from Danish rapper Gilli and Danish band Lukas Graham. The song was released as a digital download on 27 April, 2018 through Then We Take the World and Universal Music Denmark. The song peaked at number one on the Danish Singles Chart.

== Track listing ==
Digital download
No.	Title	Length
1.	"Holder Fast" (feat. Gilli & Lukas Graham)	3:12

== Charts ==
Chart (2018)	Peak position
Denmark (Tracklisten)	1

== Release history ==
Region	Date	Format	Label
Denmark	27 April 2018	Digital download	Then We Take The World; Universal Denmark
