= Love Someone (Lukas Graham song) =

Single by Lukas Graham

from the album 3 (The Purple Album)
- Released: 7 September 2018
- Length: 3:25
- Label: Then We Take the World; Copenhagen (Scandinavia excl. Iceland); Warner Bros. (other territories)
- Songwriters: James Alan; Stefan Forrest; Morten Ristorp; Lukas Forchhammer; Jaramye Daniels; Morten Pilegaard; David Labrel
- Producers: Pilo; Rissi

Lukas Graham singles chronology
"Holder Fast" (2018)	"Love Someone" (2018)	"Not a Damn Thing Changed" (2018)

"Love Someone" is a song by Danish pop and soul band Lukas Graham. It was released on 7 September 2018 as the lead single from their third studio album, 3 (The Purple Album). The song was written by James Alan, Stefan Forrest, Morten Ristorp, Lukas Forchhammer, Jaramye Daniels, Morten Pilegaard and David Labrel. The song debuted at number one on the Danish Singles Chart.

The song was featured on the third episode of season 15 of The Bachelorette and the Hallmark Channel film, Love on the Menu.

== Charts ==
=== Weekly charts ===
Weekly chart performance for "Love Someone"
Chart (2018–2019)	Peak position
Australia (ARIA)	20
Austria (Ö3 Austria Top 40)	29
Belgium (Ultratop 50 Flanders)	27
Belgium (Ultratip Bubbling Under Wallonia)	3
Canada Hot 100 (Billboard)	80
Canada AC (Billboard)	25
Canada Hot AC (Billboard)	27
Czech Republic Airplay (ČNS IFPI)	90
Czech Republic Singles Digital (ČNS IFPI)	65
Denmark (Tracklisten)	1
Germany (GfK)	33
Hungary (Rádiós Top 40)	23
Hungary (Single Top 40)	28
Ireland (IRMA)	56
Lithuania (AGATA)	77
Malaysia (RIM)	7
Netherlands (Single Top 100)	62
New Zealand (Recorded Music NZ)	27
Norway (VG-lista)	5
Portugal (AFP)	21
Romania (Airplay 100)	6
Singapore (RIAS)	4
Slovakia Airplay (ČNS IFPI)	9
Slovakia Singles Digital (ČNS IFPI)	50
Slovenia (SloTop50)	19
Spain (PROMUSICAE)	99
Sweden (Sverigetopplistan)	8
Switzerland (Schweizer Hitparade)	18
US Billboard Hot 100	70
US Adult Contemporary (Billboard)	6
US Adult Pop Airplay (Billboard)	9
US Pop Airplay (Billboard)	28

=== Year-end charts ===
2018 year-end chart performance for "Love Someone"
Chart (2018)	Position
Denmark (Tracklisten)	14
Portugal Full Track Download (AFP)	117
Sweden (Sverigetopplistan)	84

2019 year-end chart performance for "Love Someone"
Chart (2019)	Position
Australia (ARIA)	84
Denmark (Tracklisten)	18
Iceland (Tónlistinn)	50
Portugal (AFP)	108
Romania (Airplay 100)	3
Slovenia (SloTop50)	33
Sweden (Sverigetopplistan)	73
Switzerland (Schweizer Hitparade)	78
US Adult Contemporary (Billboard)	11
US Adult Top 40 (Billboard)	25

2020 year-end chart performance for "Love Someone"
Chart (2020)	Position
Denmark (Tracklisten)	93

== Certifications ==
Certifications for "Love Someone"
Region	Certification	Certified units/sales
Australia (ARIA)	3× Platinum	210,000^{‡}
Canada (Music Canada)	2× Platinum	160,000^{‡}
Denmark (IFPI Danmark)	5× Platinum	450,000^{‡}
Germany (BVMI)	Gold	200,000^{‡}
Italy (FIMI)	Gold	25,000^{‡}
Netherlands (NVPI)	Gold	40,000^{‡}
New Zealand (RMNZ)	3× Platinum	90,000^{‡}
Poland (ZPAV)	Gold	25,000^{‡}
Portugal (AFP)	2× Platinum	20,000^{‡}
Spain (Promusicae)	Platinum	60,000^{‡}
United Kingdom (BPI)	Gold	400,000^{‡}
United States (RIAA)	Platinum	1,000,000^{‡}
Streaming
Sweden (GLF)	2× Platinum	16,000,000^{†}
^{‡} Sales+streaming figures based on certification alone.^{†} Streaming-only figures based on certification alone.

== Release history ==
Region	Date	Format	Label
Denmark	7 September 2018	Digital download	Copenhagen; Then We Take the World
