= All of It All =

Single by Lukas Graham

from the album 4 (The Pink Album)
- Released: 18 February 2022
- Length: 2:58
- Label: Warner
- Songwriters: Lukas Forchhammer; Jake Torrey; Nolan Sipe; Brandon Beal
- Producers: Markus Artved; Jeff Gitelman

Lukas Graham singles chronology
"Most People" (2021)	"All of It All" (2022)	"Wish You Were Here" (2022)

"All of It All" is a song by Danish pop band Lukas Graham. It was released on 18 February 2022 by Warner Records. The song was written by Lukas Forchhammer, Jake Torrey, Nolan Sipe, and Brandon Beal. The song peaked at number 29 on the Danish Singles Chart.

== Background ==
In a statement about the song, Lukas Forchhammer says, "I want all of my wife. The good, the bad, & the ugly. I know the ups and downs of life go hand in hand and I wouldn't wanna share it with anyone else. I want all of it all of it all. The philosophy [of] if you can't handle me at my worst, you don't deserve me at my best."

== Critical reception ==
Justus Ortmann of the Nordic music magazine Gaffa describes the song as "funky, upbeat, and heartfelt", saying, "The funky bassline and driving drums, complemented by soft synths and acoustic guitar, really get your hips moving in the chorus, accompanied by 70s-style disco strings and Lukas Forchhammer's resonant vocals." Mike DeWald of Riff Magazine says the song "rises and falls from sparse to expansive and back again" and that Forchhammer delivers one of his "cleanest vocal takes".

On one hand, Rasmus Steffensen of Information dubs "All of It All" as "clearly the album's best track", saying that it "really grooves with its cool breaks and a vocal flow that lets his (Forchhamer's) boyish charm shine through." On the other hand, Sune Anderberg of Soundvenue says "All of It All" has "the rushed, formulaic structure of a hit-driven song", saying that even with "sexy electric bass and retro strings", the song "makes Forchhammer sound breathless and a bit rhythmically clumsy."

== Charts ==
Chart (2022)	Peak position
Denmark (Tracklisten)	29

== Release history ==
Release history for "All of It All"
Region	Date	Format	Label
Denmark	18 February 2022	Digital download; streaming	Warner Records
