= Lie (Lukas Graham song) =

Single by Lukas Graham

from the album 4 (The Pink Album)
- Released: 27 September 2019
- Length: 2:59
- Label: Copenhagen Records; Then We Take the World
- Songwriters: David LaBrel; George Tizzard; Jaramye Daniels; Lukas Forchhammer; Rick Parkhouse; Stefan Forrest
- Producers: Jussifer; Red Triangle

Lukas Graham singles chronology
"Not a Damn Thing Changed" (2018)	"Lie" (2019)	"Here (For Christmas)" (2019)

"Lie" is a song by Danish pop and soul band Lukas Graham. It was released on 27 September 2019 by Copenhagen Records and Then We Take the World. The song peaked at number two on the Danish Singles Chart. The song was written by David LaBrel, George Tizzard, Jaramye Daniels, Lukas Forchhammer, Rick Parkhouse and Stefan Forrest.

== Music video ==
A music video to accompany the release of "Lie" was first released on YouTube on 27 September 2019. In the video, two young actors portray an on-and-off-again couple. The boy watches as his ex-girlfriend moves on with a different guy, pining for the days when they were happy. Memories of fights and makeouts feature during the video in between scenes of their current reality. By the end of the video, they are back together.

== Charts ==
=== Weekly charts ===
Chart (2019)	Peak position
Denmark (Tracklisten)	2
New Zealand Hot Singles (RMNZ)	22
Sweden Heatseeker (Sverigetopplistan)	8
US Adult Pop Airplay (Billboard)	31

=== Year-end charts ===
Chart (2019)	Position
Denmark (Tracklisten)	74
Chart (2020)	Position
Denmark (Tracklisten)	78

== Certifications ==
Region	Certification	Certified units/sales
Denmark (IFPI Danmark)	2× Platinum	180,000^{‡}
^{‡} Sales+streaming figures based on certification alone.

== Release history ==
Region	Date	Format	Label
Denmark	27 September 2019	Digital download	Copenhagen Records; Then We Take the World
