= Here (For Christmas) =

Single by Lukas Graham
- Released: 8 November 2019
- Length: 4:00
- Label: Copenhagen; Then We Take the World
- Songwriters: David LaBrel; Jake Torrey; Lukas Forchhammer; Zach Skelton
- Producer: Zach Skelton

Lukas Graham singles chronology
| "Lie" (2019) | "Here (For Christmas)" (2019) | "Scars" (2020) |

"Here (For Christmas)" is a song by Danish pop and soul band Lukas Graham. It was released on 8 November 2019 by Copenhagen Records and Then We Take the World. The song peaked at number twenty-three on the Danish Singles Chart.

== Background ==
Talking about the song, Lukas Forchhammer said, "'Here (For Christmas)' is about William, my childhood friend, who is no longer with us. He was renovating this beautiful old boat, but he never got to put it in the water. That boat is a metaphor for all the things I wish I could do with Willy, my dad and all the others that are here no more."

== Lyric video ==
A lyric video to accompany the release of "Here (For Christmas)" was first released on YouTube on 7 November 2019. The video shows photos from Forchhammer's childhood with William and other loved ones.

== Credits and personnel ==
Credits adapted from Tidal.

- Zach Skelton – production, bass guitar, drums, guitar, keyboard, programmer, songwriting
- David LaBrel – glockenspiel, songwriting
- Jake Torrey – guitar, keyboard, songwriting
- Randy Merrill – masterer
- Mark "Spike" Stent – mixer
- Lukas Forchhammer – songwriting

== Charts ==
| Chart (2019–2022) | Peak position |
|---|---|
| Denmark (Tracklisten) | 23 |
| Germany (GfK) | 63 |
| New Zealand Hot Singles (RMNZ) | 37 |
| South Korea (Gaon) | 167 |
| Sweden Heatseeker (Sverigetopplistan) | 3 |

== Certifications ==
| Region | Certification | Certified units/sales |
|---|---|---|
| Denmark (IFPI Danmark) | Platinum | 90,000^{‡} |
^{‡} Sales+streaming figures based on certification alone.

== Release history ==
| Region | Date | Format | Label |
|---|---|---|---|
| Denmark | 8 November 2019 | Digital download; streaming | Copenhagen; Then We Take the World |
