= Not a Damn Thing Changed =

Single by Lukas Graham

from the album 3 (The Purple Album)
- Released: 12 October 2018
- Genre: Pop
- Length: 3:13
- Label: Copenhagen; Then We Take the World
- Songwriters: Lukas Forchhammer; Stefan Forrest; Morten Ristorp; David LaBrel; Henrik Bryld Wolsing; Rasmus Hedegaard
- Producers: Hennedub; Rissi; Bart Schoudel

Lukas Graham singles chronology
"Love Someone" (2018)	"Not a Damn Thing Changed" (2018)	"Lie" (2019)

"Not a Damn Thing Changed" is a song by Danish pop and soul band Lukas Graham. It was released on 12 October 2018 as the second single from their third studio album, 3 (The Purple Album). The song was written by Lukas Forchhammer, Stefan Forrest, Morten Ristorp, David LaBrel, Henrik Bryld Wolsing and Rasmus Hedegaard. The song peaked at number two on the Danish Singles Chart.

== Background ==
Talking about the song, Forchhammer said, "I still live two blocks away from where I grew up. I still hang out with the same guys. The song is a tribute to one of the guys I grew up with who hung himself in January. He was three months older than me and we walked through life together."

== Music video ==
A music video to accompany the release of "Not a Damn Thing Changed" was first released on YouTube on 11 October 2018 at a total length of three minutes and forty-nine seconds. The video was directed by René Sascha Johannsen. Forchhammer's real-life childhood friends appear in the video, which they filmed in Copenhagen and their hometown, Christiania.

== Charts ==
Chart (2018)	Peak position
Denmark (Tracklisten)	2
Sweden Heatseeker Songs (Sverigetopplistan)	16

== Certifications ==
Region	Certification	Certified units/sales
Denmark (IFPI Danmark)	Platinum	90,000^{‡}
^{‡} Sales+streaming figures based on certification alone.

== Release history ==
Region	Date	Format	Label
Denmark	12 October 2018	Digital download	Copenhagen Records; Then We Take the World
