= 3 (The Purple Album) =

Studio album by Lukas Graham
- Released: 26 October 2018
- Length: 33:11
- Labels: Copenhagen; Then We Take the World; Warner Bros.
- Producers: Hennedub; Rissi; Pilo; Nova Wav

Lukas Graham chronology
Lukas Graham (2015)	3 (The Purple Album) (2018)	4 (The Pink Album) (2023)

Singles from 3 (The Purple Album)
- 1. "Love Someone" Released: 7 September 2018; 2. "Not a Damn Thing Changed" Released: 12 October 2018

3 (The Purple Album) is the third studio album by Danish band Lukas Graham. It was released on 26 October 2018 by Copenhagen Records, Then We Take the World and Warner Bros. Records. The album features songs about "growing up and moving on". The band toured in support of the album in 2019. The album debuted at number one in Denmark while on the singles chart, "Love Someone" stayed atop for an eighth week, "Not a Damn Thing Changed" rose back up to number two and the other eight album tracks also entered.

== Background ==
Events in the lives of the band post the Blue Album in 2015 such as funerals, suicide, birth, marriage and awards influenced the Purple Album. The album opens with "Not a Damn Thing Changed", which a dedication at the end of the song in memory of a lost friend. "Lullaby" was influenced by the birth of his daughter.

A conversation between Forchhammer and Dan Wilson in relation to political songs sparked the idea for a redemption song. Amy Wadge and Forchhammer were working on Lullaby when Wadge was inspired to come out with lyrics used in the redemption song. The opening of the song references Bob Marley and Lennon. Forchhammer has stated that Marley was one of the biggest inspirations for him; Marley's Redemption Song, a reminder of war and the direct impact it had on his childhood.

"Love Someone" and "Promise" is dedicated to Forchhammer's wife while "Unhappy" is about sorting out disagreements between the two.

== Critical reception ==
Mark Kennedy of the Fort Wayne Journal Gazette called the album full of "regret and moodiness" and noted that it is "also largely shorn of the upbeat tempos and hip-hop elements that made his [Graham's] last album so successful. This is a truly melancholy Dane." Kennedy ultimately felt that the album leaves the listener feeling "bummed out".

== Track listing ==
No.	Title	Writer(s)	Producer(s)	Length
1.	"Not a Damn Thing Changed"	Lukas Forchhammer; Morten Ristorp; Stefan Forrest; Rasmus Hedegaard; David LaBrel; Henrik Bryld Wolsing	Hennedub; Rissi; Bart Schoudel^{[v]}	3:13
2.	"Lullaby"	Forchhammer; Ristorp; Morten Pilegaard; Forrest; Brandon Beal	Rissi; Pilo; Schoudel^{[v]}	3:11
3.	"You're Not the Only One (Redemption Song)"	Forchhammer; Forrest; Ristorp; Pilegaard; Amy Wadge; Dan Wilson	Rissi; Pilo; William Robert Washington^{[a]}; Schoudel^{[v]}	3:03
4.	"Love Someone"	Forchhammer; Forrest; Ristorp; Pilegaard; Jaramye Daniels; LaBrel; James Alan	Rissi; Pilo; David LaBrel^{[c]}; Schoudel^{[v]}	3:25
5.	"Promise"	Forchhammer; Ristorp; Pilegaard; Forrest; Brittany Coney; LaBrel; Blu June	Rissi; Pilo; Nova Wav; Washington^{[a]}; Schoudel^{[v]}	3:14
6.	"Stick Around"	Forchhammer; Ristorp; Pilegaard; Coney; LaBrel; June	Rissi; Pilo; Schoudel^{[v]}	3:12
7.	"Unhappy"	Forchhammer; Ristorp; Pilegaard; Forrest; Kennedi Lykken; Daniels; LaBrel	Rissi; Pilo; Don Stefano^{[c]}; Schoudel^{[v]}	3:16
8.	"Everything That Isn't Me"	Forchhammer; Ristorp; Pilegaard; George Taylor	Rissi; Pilo; Schoudel^{[v]}	3:17
9.	"Hold My Hand"	Forchhammer; Ristorp; Pilegaard; Taylor	Rissi; Pilo; Washington^{[a]}; Schoudel^{[v]}	3:47
10.	"Say Yes (Church Ballad)"	Forchhammer; Ristorp; Pilegaard	Rissi; Pilo; Washington^{[a]}; Schoudel^{[v]}	3:33
Total length:				33:11

Digital deluxe edition bonus tracks
No.	Title	Length
11.	"Love Someone" (live in Paris)
12.	"7 Years" (live in Paris)
13.	"You're Not the Only One (Redemption Song)" (live in Paris)

Notes

- ^{^[c]} signifies a co-producer
- ^{^[a]} signifies an additional producer
- ^{^[v]} signifies a vocal producer

== Personnel ==
Lukas Graham

- Lukas Forchhammer – vocals
- Mark "Lovestick" Falgren – drums (track 10)
- Magnus Larsson – bass guitar (5, 7, 10)

Additional musicians

- Rissi – piano (all tracks), synthesizer (3), percussion (4), programming (4–6, 9), bass guitar (5); additional vocals, guitar, Wurlitzer (7); organ (9)
- Hennedub – drums (1), additional drums (3)
- Don Stefano – strings (1), additional vocals (7)
- Rasmus Hedegaard – synthesizer (1)
- Pilo – drums (2–4, 6, 8–10), programming (2–10), bass guitar (3), organ (4, 8, 9), percussion (5, 7)
- Armen Ksajikian – cello (2, 4, 6, 8)
- Cecilia Tsan – cello (2, 4, 6, 8)
- Charlie Tyler – cello (2, 4, 6, 8)
- David Low – cello (2, 4, 6, 8)
- Elizabeth Wright – cello (2, 4, 6, 8)
- Giovanna Clayton – cello (2, 4, 6, 8)
- Alyssa Park – concertmaster, violin (2, 4, 6, 8)
- Timothy Loo – conductor, orchestral arrangement (2, 4, 6, 8)
- Niall Ferguson – orchestral arrangement (2, 4, 6, 8)
- Caroline Buckman – viola (2, 4, 6, 8)
- Diana Wade – viola (2, 4, 6, 8)
- Erik Rynearson – viola (2, 4, 6, 8)
- Luke Maurer – viola (2, 4, 6, 8)
- Michelle Gasworth – viola (2, 4, 6, 8)
- Stefan Smith – viola (2, 4, 6, 8)
- Alwyn Wright – violin (2, 4, 6, 8)
- Charlie Bisharat – violin (2, 4, 6, 8)
- Christian Hebel – violin (2, 4, 6, 8)
- Kevin Kumar – violin (2, 4, 6, 8)
- Mark Robertson – violin (2, 4, 6, 8)
- Sarah Thornblade – violin (2, 4, 6, 8)
- Tami Hatwan – violin (2, 4, 6, 8)
- Viola Schwartz Forchhammer – samples (2)
- David LaBrel – guitar (4, 6, 8, 10)
- Wade Jones – guitar (4)
- Brittany "Chi" Coney – additional vocals, drums (5)
- Denisia "Blu June" Andrews – additional vocals (5–7)
- Morgan Price – baritone saxophone, tenor saxophone (5)
- Nicolaic Wendelboe – organ (5)
- Will Herrington – organ (5)
- Raymond Mason – trombone (5)
- William Aukstik – trumpet (5)
- Jacques Loui Bruun – percussion (9)
- Katie Pearlman – additional vocals (10)

Technical

- Randy Merrill – mastering
- Serban Ghenea – mixing (1)
- John Hanes – mixing (1)
- Delbert Bowers – mixing (2–4, 6–8, 10)
- Vivid – mixing (5)
- Mark "Spike" Stent – mixing (9)
- David LaBrel – audio engineering, recording
- Vince Chiarito – engineering (5)
- Nick Mac – engineering assistance (1–3, 5–10)

== Charts ==
=== Weekly charts ===
Chart (2018)	Peak position
Australian Digital Albums (ARIA)	31
Belgian Albums (Ultratop Flanders)	62
Canadian Albums (Billboard)	68
Czech Albums (ČNS IFPI)	68
Danish Albums (Hitlisten)	1
Finnish Albums (Suomen virallinen lista)	29
German Albums (Offizielle Top 100)	57
Norwegian Albums (VG-lista)	2
South Korean Albums (Gaon)	93
Spanish Albums (PROMUSICAE)	62
Swedish Albums (Sverigetopplistan)	3
Swiss Albums (Schweizer Hitparade)	85
US Billboard 200	89

=== Year-end charts ===
Chart (2018)	Position
Danish Albums (Hitlisten)	6
Chart (2019)	Position
Danish Albums (Hitlisten)	9
Chart (2020)	Position
Danish Albums (Hitlisten)	39
Chart (2021)	Position
Danish Albums (Hitlisten)	68

== Certifications ==
Region	Certification	Certified units/sales
Denmark (IFPI Danmark)	4× Platinum	80,000^{‡}
Sweden (GLF)	Gold	15,000^{‡}
^{‡} Sales+streaming figures based on certification alone.
