= Good Times Bad Times (disambiguation) =

"Good Times Bad Times" is a song by Led Zeppelin.

Good Times Bad Times or GTBT may also refer to:

- Good Times, Bad Times... Ten Years of Godsmack, an album by Godsmack
- Good Times, Bad Times (TV series) (Goede Tijden, Slechte Tijden), a Dutch soap opera
- Gute Zeiten, schlechte Zeiten, a similar German soap opera
- Good Times, Bad Times (book), written by Harold Evans
- Good Times Bad Times (film), a 1969 Canadian TV film directed by Donald Shebib
- Good Times, Bad Times, an EP by Nuclear Assault
- Good Times/Bad Times, a novel by James Kirkwood, Jr.
- "Good Times, Bad Times", a song by The Rolling Stones from 12 X 5
- GTBT (album), album by Japanese band Chicago Poodle
- Good Times, Bad Times, a 2023 movie by Croatian director Nevio Marasović
