= Share That Love =

Single by Lukas Graham featuring G-Eazy

from the album 4 (The Pink Album)
- Released: 21 August 2020
- Length: 2:52
- Label: Warner
- Songwriters: Dave Gibson; Digital Farm Animals; Gerald Earl Gillum; Lukas Forchhammer; Morten Ristorp; Neil Ormandy
- Producer: Rissi

Lukas Graham singles chronology
"Love Songs" (2020)	"Share That Love" (2020)	"Where I'm From" (2020)

G-Eazy singles chronology
"Bounce Back" (2020)	"Share That Love" (2020)	"Down" (2020)

"Share That Love" is a song by Danish pop and soul band Lukas Graham, featuring American rapper G-Eazy. It was released on 21 August 2020 by Warner Records. The song was written by Dave Gibson, Digital Farm Animals, Gerald Earl Gillum, Lukas Forchhammer, Morten Ristorp and Neil Ormandy.

== Background ==
In a statement, Lukas Forchhammer said, "I grew up in a neighbourhood where if you had something, you shared it. The place is called Christiania. It's an old army base that got squatted in 1971. The community operates from the concept that nobody owns their house and that you can do what you want, as long as you don't inhibit others from doing what they want. For all the upsides to living in Christiania, there was also trouble with the police, or issues with gangs in the city. I've tried to embody all of that in this song, and when I listen to it I'm reminded of some of the ways our community has really come together, like all the great parties we've thrown, or the huge protests where we've marched against the government threatening to evict us from Christiania. In these troubling times, I guess it is more important than ever to share what we have, especially your love."

== Lyric video ==
A lyric video to accompany the release of "Share That Love" was first released onto YouTube on 20 August 2020. The video shows the band painting a massive 'Share That Love' mural on a landmark music venue in Lukas' hometown of Christiania in Copenhagen, Denmark. The mural was created by acclaimed Copenhagen street artist Rasmus Balstrøm.

== Music video ==
A music video to accompany the release of "Share That Love" was first released onto YouTube on 30 September 2020. The video was directed by Marc Klasfeld.

== Live performances ==
The song was performed on the American morning television show Good Morning America.

== Credits and personnel ==
Credits adapted from Tidal.

- Morten Ristorp – producer, background vocals, drums, guitar, percussion, piano, writer
- Dave Gibson – background vocals, writer
- Jyvonne Haskin – choir
- Lydia René – choir
- Ronnie OHannon – choir
- William "B.A." Washington – choir, vocal production
- Gerald Earl Gillum – vocals, writer
- Randy Merrill – masterer
- Mark "Spike" Stent – mixer
- David LaBrel – recording engineer
- Emil Falk – recording engineer
- Lukas Forchhammer – vocals, guitar, writer
- Magnus Larsson – bass
- Mark Falgren – drums
- Digital Farm Animals – writer
- Neil Ormandy – writer

== Charts ==
=== Weekly charts ===
Weekly chart performance for "Share That Love"
Chart (2020–2021)	Peak position
Denmark (Tracklisten)	14
Hungary (Rádiós Top 40)	29
Iceland (Tónlistinn)	19
New Zealand Hot Singles (RMNZ)	23
Sweden (Sverigetopplistan)	32
US Adult Pop Airplay (Billboard)	27

=== Year-end charts ===
Year-end chart performance for "Share That Love"
Chart (2021)	Position
Denmark (Tracklisten)	50

== Certifications ==
Certifications for "Share That Love"
Region	Certification	Certified units/sales
Denmark (IFPI Danmark)	2× Platinum	180,000^{‡}
New Zealand (RMNZ)	Gold	15,000^{‡}
^{‡} Sales+streaming figures based on certification alone.

== Release history ==
Release history for "Share That Love"
Region	Date	Format	Label
Denmark	21 August 2020	Digital download; streaming	Warner Records
