= Scars (Lukas Graham song) =

2020 single by Lukas Graham

Single by Lukas Graham
- Released: 20 March 2020
- Length: 2:52
- Label: Copenhagen; Then We Take the World
- Songwriters: Gregory Hein; James Nicholas Bailey; Jimmie Gutch; Lukas Forchhammer; Morten Ristorp
- Producers: Jimmie Gutch; Rissi

Lukas Graham singles chronology
"Here (For Christmas)" (2019)	"Scars" (2020)	"Tættere End Vi Tror" (2020)

"Scars" is a song by Danish pop and soul band Lukas Graham. It was released on 20 March 2020 by Copenhagen Records and Then We Take the World. The song was written by Gregory Hein, James Nicholas Bailey, Jimmie Gutch, Lukas Forchhammer and Morten Ristorp.

== Background ==
In a press release, the band's lead singer Lukas Forchhammer said, "Scars come in many shapes and forms. The physical ones are often the easiest to deal with, while psychological scars can be very hard to cope with because no one can see them so we have to actively share them. We need to talk about these things in order to heal."

== Credits and personnel ==
Credits adapted from Tidal.

- Jimmie Gutch – producer, writer
- Rissi – producer
- Aldae and Nick Bailey – co-producer
- Bart Schoudel – engineer
- Rasmus Hedegaard – engineer
- Lukas Forchhammer – gang Vocals, vocals, writer
- Morten Ristorp – gang vocals, guitar, piano, strings, vocal production, writer
- Randy Merrill – waterer
- Tony Maserati – mixer
- Gregory Hein – writer
- James Nicholas Bailey – writer

== Charts ==
Chart (2020)	Peak position
Belgium (Ultratip Bubbling Under Wallonia)	36
Denmark (Tracklisten)	9
New Zealand Hot Singles (RMNZ)	26
Sweden Heatseeker (Sverigetopplistan)	3

== Certifications ==
Region	Certification	Certified units/sales
Denmark (IFPI Danmark)	Gold	45,000^{‡}
^{‡} Sales+streaming figures based on certification alone.

== Release history ==
Region	Date	Format	Label
Denmark	20 March 2020	Digital download	Copenhagen Records; Then We Take the World
