= Wish You Were Here (Lukas Graham song) =

Single by Lukas Graham featuring Khalid

from the album 4 (The Pink Album)
- Released: 19 August 2022
- Length: 2:55
- Label: Warner
- Songwriters: Lukas Forchhammer; Andrew DeRoberts; Gregory Hein; Khalid Robinson; Ryan Tedder
- Producers: Andrew DeRoberts; Ryan Tedder

Lukas Graham singles chronology
| "All of It All" (2022) | "Wish You Were Here" (2022) | "Home Movies" (2023) |

Khalid singles chronology
| "Numb" (2022) | "Wish You Were Here" (2022) | "Satellite" (2022) |

"Wish You Were Here" is a song by Danish pop band Lukas Graham, featuring American singer-songwriter Khalid. It was released on 19 August 2022 by Warner Records. The song was written by Lukas Forchhammer, Khalid, Andrew DeRoberts, Gregory Hein, and Ryan Tedder. The song peaked at number 10 on the Danish Singles Chart.

== Background ==
In a statement, Lukas Forchhammer said, "'Wish You Were Here' is an anthem to the best friends. We all know the feeling of standing on the edge or the top of the world and missing someone special. It's always at big events and special occasions that I miss those unique people in my life that made me who I am today."

== Charts ==
| Chart (2022) | Peak position |
|---|---|
| Denmark (Tracklisten) | 10 |
| New Zealand Hot Singles (RMNZ) | 7 |
| Sweden (Sverigetopplistan) | 27 |

== Certifications ==
| Region | Certification | Certified units/sales |
|---|---|---|
| Denmark (IFPI Danmark) | Platinum | 90,000^{‡} |
^{‡} Sales+streaming figures based on certification alone.

== Release history ==
Release history for "Wish You Were Here"
| Region | Date | Format | Label |
|---|---|---|---|
| Denmark | 19 August 2022 | Digital download; streaming | Warner Records |
