= 4 (The Pink Album) =

Studio album by Lukas Graham
- Released: 20 January 2023
- Length: 33:40
- Label: Warner
- Producers: Rory Andrew; Markus Artved; Noah Conrad; Phil Cook; Andrew DeRoberts; Jeff Gitelman; Jussifer; Joe Kearns; David LaBrel; Red Triangle; Rissi; Ryan Tedder; Wynne

Lukas Graham chronology
3 (The Purple Album) (2018)	4 (The Pink Album) (2023)	Good Times (2026)

Singles from 4 (The Pink Album)
- 1. "Lie" Released: 27 September 2019; 2. "Share That Love" Released: 21 August 2020; 3. "All of It All" Released: 18 February 2022; 4. "Wish You Were Here" Released: 19 August 2022; 5. "Home Movies" Released: 13 January 2023

4 (The Pink Album) is the fourth studio album by Danish band Lukas Graham, released on 20 January 2023, through Warner Records. The album is supported by five singles: "Lie", "Share That Love", "All of It All", "Wish You Were Here" and "Home Movies". It is their first studio album in five years following the release of their third studio album 3 (The Purple Album) (2018).

== Background ==
During the COVID-19 pandemic in 2020, the band's frontman Lukas Forchhammer decided to get sober to focus on family and music, after self-medicating and being stuck in a creative rut after the events of his father's death, as well as marriage and experiencing fatherhood himself.

In the album's announcement, Forchhammer states, "4 (The Pink Album) is pure self-reflection. I'm not saying I'll never have a drink ever again, but I went clean. It had gotten to the point of self-medicating, so I stopped. Over the past couple of years, it became fun to write songs again, go to rehearsal, and work with music. I embraced the art of it. I'm not trying to be a professional anymore, because all I want to do is be a happy amateur."

== Track listing ==
4 (The Pink Album) track listing
No.	Title	Writer(s)	Producer(s)	Length
1.	"Stay Above"	Lukas Forchhammer; Brandon Beal; Nina Nesbitt; Joe Kearns; Phil Cook	Kearns; Cook	2:29
2.	"Wish You Were Here" (featuring Khalid)	Forchhammer; Andrew DeRoberts; Gregory Hein; Khalid Robinson; Ryan Tedder	DeRoberts; Tedder	2:55
3.	"This Is Me Letting You Go"	Forchhammer; Beal; Jake Torrey; Jeff Gitelman	Gitelman	2:50
4.	"Share That Love" (featuring G-Eazy)	Dave Gibson; Forchhammer; Digital Farm Animals; Neil Ormandy; Morten Ristorp; Gerald Gillum	Rissi; William "B.A." Washington^{[v]}	2:52
5.	"Home Movies" (with Mickey Guyton)	David LaBrel; Jaramye Daniels; Nicolle Galyon; Rory Andrew	Markus Artved; Andrew; Beal^{[v]}; Karen Kosowski^{[v]}	3:16
6.	"All of It All"	Forchhammer; Torrey; Nolan Sipe; Beal	Gitelman; Artved^{[a]}	2:58
7.	"By the Way"	Forchhammer; Beal; Daniella Binyamin; Artved; Rasmus Hedegaard	Artved	2:49
8.	"Lie"	Forchhammer; Stefan Forrest; Rick Parkhouse; Daniels; George Tizzard; LaBrel	Jussifer; Red Triangle	2:59
9.	"Never Change"	Forchhammer; mayak; Daniels; Andrew	Andrew; Beal^{[v]}	3:20
10.	"Say Forever"	Forchhammer; Philip Plested; Gibson; Noah Conrad	Conrad	4:08
11.	"One by One"	Forchhammer; Beal; LaBrel; James Norton; Gitelman	LaBrel; Gitelman	3:04
Total length:				33:40

Notes

- ^{^[a]} signifies an additional producer.
- ^{^[v]} signifies a vocal producer.

== Personnel ==
Lukas Graham

- Mark Falgren – additional drums (track 7), drums (10)
- Lukas Forchhammer – lead vocals (all tracks), background vocals (tracks 2, 5), choir (11)

Additional musicians

- Joe Kearns – all instruments, programming (track 1)
- Phil Cook – all instruments, programming (track 1)
- Michael Duce – background vocals (track 1)
- Nina Nesbitt – background vocals (track 1)
- Andrew DeRoberts – background vocals, bass guitar, electric guitar, programming (track 2)
- Khalid – background vocals, vocals (track 2)
- Ryan Tedder – background vocals, programming (track 2)
- Jeff Gitelman – programming (tracks 3, 6), electric guitar (3, 11), keyboards (3, 11), bass guitar (3), all instruments (6); drum programming, drums, strings arrangement (11)
- Cody Sommer – drums (track 3)
- Lars Vissing – horns (track 3)
- Nikolai Bøgeland – horns (track 3)
- The Rusty Trombones – horns (track 3)
- Thomas Edinger – horns (track 3)
- Morten Ristorp – background vocals, drums, electric guitar, percussion, piano (track 4)
- Dave Gibson – background vocals (track 4)
- Sean Hurley – bass guitar (track 4)
- Jyvonne Haskin – choir (track 4)
- Lydia René – choir (track 4)
- Ronnie OHannon – choir (track 4)
- William "B.A." Washington – choir (track 4)
- G-Eazy – vocals (track 4)
- Andreas Lund – electric guitar (tracks 5, 7, 10), banjo (5)
- Markus Artved – Hammond B3 organ, strings (track 5); drum programming, drums, percussion, piano, samples, synthesizer, trumpet (7)
- Henrik Møller – bass guitar (tracks 5, 7)
- Jaramye Daniels – background vocals (tracks 5, 8, 9); electric guitar, percussion (8)
- Rory Andrew – background vocals (tracks 5, 9); programming, strings, synthesizer (5); instruments, strings arrangement (9)
- Mickey Guyton – background vocals, vocals (track 5)
- Scott Seiver – drums (track 5)
- David Maemone – Wurlitzer (track 5)
- Brandon Beal – background vocals (tracks 6), choir (11)
- Daniella Binyamin – background vocals (track 7)
- Jacob Artved – electric guitar (track 7)
- George Tizzard – background vocals, drum programming, percussion, programming (track 8)
- Rick Parkhouse – bass guitar, drum programming, electric guitar, programming (track 8)
- Stefan Forrest – piano (track 8)
- Jussifer – programming (track 8)
- Edgard Sandoval – viola, violin (track 9)
- Noah Conrad – acoustic guitar, drum programming, drums, electric guitar, keyboards, piano (track 10)
- David LaBrel – bass guitar, drums, piano, sound effects (track 11)
- James Norton – choir (track 11)

Technical

- Randy Merrill – mastering (tracks 1–5, 7–9, 11)
- Dale Becker – mastering (tracks 6, 10)
- Tony Maserati – mixing (tracks 1, 3, 5–)
- Serban Ghenea – mixing (track 2)
- Mark "Spike" Stent – mixing (track 4)
- Joe Kearns – engineering (track 1)
- Phil Cook – engineering (track 1)
- Denis Kosiak – engineering (track 2)
- Rich Rich – engineering (track 2)
- Jeff Gitelman – engineering (tracks 3, 11)
- RJ Cardenas – engineering (tracks 3, 11)
- David LaBrel – engineering (track 4)
- Emil Falk – engineering (track 4)
- Markus Artved – engineering (tracks 5, 7)
- Rory Andrew – engineering (tracks 5, 9)
- Scott Seiver – engineering (track 5)
- Rasmus Juncker – engineering (track 7)
- Red Triangle – engineering (track 8)
- Austen Healey – engineering (track 10)
- Noah Conrad – engineering (track 10)
- Brandon Beal – vocal engineering (tracks 1, 3, 6, 7, 10, 11)
- Frank Grønbæk – drums engineering (track 7)
- Julia Norelli – mixing assistance (tracks 1, 3, 5, 7, 9–11)
- Gabriella Wayne – mixing assistance (tracks 1, 3, 7, 9–11)
- Najeeb Jones – mixing assistance (tracks 1, 3, 7, 9–11)
- Bryce Bordone – mixing assistance (track 2)

== Charts ==
=== Weekly charts ===
Weekly chart performance for 4 (The Pink Album)
Chart (2023)	Peak position
Danish Albums (Hitlisten)	1
German Albums (Offizielle Top 100)	56

=== Year-end charts ===
Year-end chart performance for 4 (The Pink Album)
Chart (2023)	Position
Danish Albums (Hitlisten)	45

== Certifications ==
Certifications for 4 (The Pink Album)
Region	Certification	Certified units/sales
Denmark (IFPI Danmark)	Platinum	20,000^{‡}
^{‡} Sales+streaming figures based on certification alone.

== Release history ==
Release history and formats for 4 (The Pink Album)
Region	Release date	Format	Label
Denmark	20 January 2023	CD; LP; Digital download; streaming	Universal
