= Good Time =

Good Time may refer to:

- Good Time (film), a 2017 American crime film by the Safdie brothers
- Good conduct time, a sentence reduction for good behavior in prison

== Music ==
=== Albums ===
- Good Time (Alan Jackson album), 2008, or the title song (see below)
- Good Time (Niko Moon album), 2021
- Good Time (soundtrack), by Oneohtrix Point Never from the 2017 film, or the title song (see below)
- A Good Time, by Davido, 2019
- Good Time, by Ranky Tanky, 2019
- Good Time, an EP by Niko Moon, 2020, or the title song (see below)

=== Songs ===
- "Good Time" (Alan Jackson song), 2008
- "Good Time" (American Spring song), 1972
- "Good Time" (Inna song), 2014
- "Good Time" (Jin Akanishi song), 2014
- "Good Time" (Justice Crew song), 2015
- "Good Time" (Luca Hänni and Christopher S song), 2014
- "Good Time" (Niko Moon song), 2020
- "Good Time" (Owl City and Carly Rae Jepsen song), 2012
- "Good Time" (Paris Hilton song), 2013
- "Good Time" (Polish Club song), 2023
- "Good Time" (Sheppard song), 2023
- "Good Time", by A, 2003
- "Good Time", by Alex Lahey from The Answer Is Always Yes, 2023
- "Good Time", by Brazilian Girls from New York City, 2008
- "Good Time", by Crystal Castles from Crystal Castles, 2008
- "Good Time", by J Hus from Common Sense, 2017
- "Good Time", by Jodie Harsh as a non-album single, 2022
- "Good Time", by Leroy from Music from Scrubs, 2002
- "Good Time", by MC Cheung from Have A Good Time, 2021
- "Good Time", by Oneohtrix Point Never from Good Time, 2017
- "Good Time", by Sistar from Shake It, 2015
- "Good Time", by the Dare from What's Wrong with New York?, 2024

== See also ==
- Good Times (disambiguation)
