= Call My Name (Lukas Graham song) =

Single by Lukas Graham
- Released: 17 September 2021
- Length: 3:21
- Label: Warner
- Songwriters: Lukas Forchhammer; Brandon Beal; Fraser Churchill
- Producers: Tyler Spry; Fraser Churchill

Lukas Graham singles chronology
"Happy for You" (2021)	"Call My Name" (2021)	"Most People" (2021)

"Call My Name" is a song by Danish pop band Lukas Graham. It was released as a single on 17 September 2021 by Warner Records. The song was written by Lukas Forchhammer, Brandon Beal, and Fraser Churchill, and peaked at number 33 on the Danish Singles Chart.

== Background ==
In a statement, Lukas Forchhammer said, "I wish more people had said that to me when I was younger. 'Call My Name'. Cause sometimes that's all that's needed, just [a] person to talk to, a hand to hold or someone who'll simply listen." About the song, he says, "'Call My Name' is a reminder to everyone, but mostly to myself I guess, to ask for help and support when I need it. We all need a helping hand sometimes, but if we don't let our loved ones know, how can they help?"

== Charts ==
Chart (2021)	Peak position
Denmark (Tracklisten)	33

== Certifications ==
Region	Certification	Certified units/sales
Denmark (IFPI Danmark)	Gold	45,000^{‡}
^{‡} Sales+streaming figures based on certification alone.

== Release history ==
Release history for "Call My Name"
Region	Date	Format	Label
Denmark	17 September 2021	Digital download; streaming	Warner Records
