= Good Times (Lukas Graham album) =

Studio album by Lukas Graham
- Released: 14 August 2026
- Length: 32:38
- Label: Universal
- Producers: William Frederik Asingh; Don Stefano; Roger Kleinman; Marty Maro; John Mark Nelson; Benjamin Pinkus; Rissi; Zach Seman

Lukas Graham chronology
4 (The Pink Album) (2023)	Good Times (2026)

Singles from Good Times
- 1. "To Know a Girl" Released: 24 April 2026; 2. "Second Chance" Released: 22 May 2026; 3. "Good Times" Released: 17 July 2026; 4. "Before You Go" Released: 14 August 2026

Professional ratings
Review scores
Source	Rating
Ekstra Bladet	3.5/6 stars
Politiken	3/6 hearts
Soundvenue	2/6 stars

Good Times is the fifth studio album by Danish band Lukas Graham, released on 14 August 2026, through Universal. The album is supported by four singles: "To Know a Girl", "Second Chance", the title track "Good Times", and "Before You Go". It serves as the follow-up to their fourth studio album 4 (The Pink Album) (2023). It is their first album not to re-use the cover from their debut.

== Background ==
Good Times differentiates from Lukas Graham's usual music style, switching out their well-known pop-soul music for folk-pop music, with lead singer Lukas Forchhammer wanting to reconnect with his Irish roots he took after his late father, Eugene Graham, who was born in the town of Donegal. Forchhammer said he recorded the album with "people my dad knew. People who had slept on a couch in my mom and dad's living room. It was very important to me that we got a hold of some of these musicians and got that cultural connection."

== Track listing ==
Credits are adapted from Tidal.

Good Times track listing
No.	Title	Lyrics	Music	Producer(s)	Length
1.	"Good Times"	Lukas Forchhammer; Stefan Forrest; Tyler Spry; Ryan Tedder; Josh Varnadore	Roger Kleinman; John Mark Nelson; Zachary Seman	Don Stefano; Kleinman; Seman; Nelson^{[c]}	3:04
2.	"Second Chance"	Forchhammer; Leonard Caspersen; Bonnie Dymond; Margrethe Frich; Nelson; Zaccaria Massagrande	Forchhammer; Benjamin Pinkus; Forrest	Don Stefano; Kleinman; Pinkus; Seman	3:07
3.	"Before You Go"	Forchhammer; Scott Harris	Morten Ristorp	Rissi	3:37
4.	"To Know a Girl"	Forchhammer; Dymond; Marty Maro	Forchhammer; Dymond; Maro	Don Stefano; Kleinman; Maro; Seman	1:59
5.	"Freetown Road"	Forchhammer; Nirob Islam	William Frederik Asingh; Søren Breum Skovsted	Asingh	2:11
6.	"River Run"	Forchhammer; Cameron Bartolini; Liam Kevany; Nelson	Forrest; Kleinman; Seman	Don Stefano; Kleinman; Seman	2:07
7.	"Falling"	Forchhammer; Dymond; Forrest; Kevany; Nelson; Maro	Kleinman; Seman	Don Stefano; Kleinman; Seman	2:55
8.	"Carry Me Home"	Forchhammer	Kleinman; Seman	Don Stefano; Kleinman; Seman	1:01
9.	"Days Like These"	Forchhammer; Forrest; Sean Kennedy; Nelson	Kleinman; Nelson; Seman	Don Stefano; Kleinman; Nelson; Seman	2:15
10.	"Rich Man"	Forchhammer; Dan Caplen; Forrest; Nelson; Varnadore	Forrest; Kleinman; Seman	Don Stefano; Kleinman; Seman	2:30
11.	"Nights I Won't Forget"	Forchhammer; Ruthy Raba; Jenson Vaughan	Markus Artved	Don Stefano; Kleinman; Seman	0:39
12.	"Last Mile"	Forchhammer; Isa Azier; Remy Gautreau; Remme ter Haar	Forrest; Kleinman; Seman	Don Stefano; Kleinman; Nelson; Seman	3:09
13.	"Loved You Better"	Forchhammer; Nelson; Simon Oscroft; Varnadore	Forrest; Kleinman; Seman	Don Stefano; Nelson; Kleinman; Seman	4:04
Total length:					32:38

=== Note ===
- ^{^[c]} signifies a co-producer

== Personnel ==
Credits are adapted from Tidal.

=== Musicians ===
- Lukas Forchhammer – vocals (all tracks), background vocals (tracks 5, 9, 10)
- Zachary Seman – synthesizer (1, 2, 4, 6–13), organ (1, 9, 10), strings (2), piano (6, 12, 13)
- Roger Kleinman – background vocals (1, 2, 4, 6, 7, 9, 10, 12, 13), guitar (1, 6, 9, 12, 13), piano (1), acoustic guitar (2, 8, 11)
- Tim O'Brien – mandolin (1, 2, 4, 6, 7, 9, 10, 12, 13), background vocals (1, 2, 4, 12, 13)
- Bryan Sutton – acoustic guitar (1, 2, 6, 7, 9, 10, 12, 13), guitar (4)
- Sam Grisman – bass guitar (1, 2, 4, 6, 7, 13), upright bass (9, 10)
- Greg Liszt – banjo (1, 2, 4, 6, 7, 9, 10, 12)
- Lindsay Lou – background vocals (1, 2, 4, 7, 12, 13)
- Phoebe Hunt – background vocals (1, 2, 4, 7, 12, 13)
- Bonnie Dymond – background vocals (1, 2, 4, 7), guitar (4)
- Stuart Duncan – fiddle (1, 2, 6, 7, 9, 12, 13)
- Jamie Dick – drums (1, 6, 7, 9, 10, 12, 13)
- Michael McGoldrick – uilleann pipes (1, 6, 7, 13); bodhrán, whistle (1, 6); Irish low whistle (1, 7), tin whistle (7)
- Alan Doherty – flute, whistle (1, 6, 7, 13)
- John Mark Nelson – background vocals (1), acoustic guitar (6, 9, 10, 12), drums (9, 10)
- Mike Merenda – background vocals (1, 9, 10)
- Opal Merenda – background vocals (1, 9, 10)
- Ruth Ungar – background vocals (1, 9, 10)
- Will Merenda – background vocals (1, 9, 10)
- Josh Varnadore – acoustic guitar (1)
- Elliot Scheiner – acoustic guiutar (2)
- Margrethe Frich – background vocals (2)
- Benjamin Pinkus – harmonica (2)
- David Seman – harmonica (2)
- Andreas Lund – guitar (3, 7), acoustic guitar (6)
- Morten Ristorp – additional vocals, percussion, programming, synthesizer (3)
- Marty Maro – bass, guitar, percussion, programming (4)
- Søren Breum Skovsted – background vocals, guitar, keyboards (5)
- Nirob Islam – background vocals (5)
- William Frederik Asingh – drums (5)
- Luke Hamel – bass guitar (9, 10)
- Sean Hurley – bass guitar (9, 10)
- Dan MacDonald – drums (9, 10)
- Remy Gautreau – background vocals (12)
- Rushad Eggleston – cello (13)

=== Technical ===
- Morten Ristorp – vocal production
- Cameron Solon – engineering (1–4, 6–9, 12, 13)
- Marty Maro – engineering (4)
- Maguire Fraatz – additional engineering (1–4, 6, 9, 12, 13)
- Rob Kinelski – mixing
- Eli Heisler – additional mixing (1–3, 6, 9, 10)
- Randy Merrill – mastering

== Charts ==
Chart performance for Good Times
Chart (2026)	Peak position
Danish Albums (Hitlisten)	1

== Release history ==
Release history and formats for Good Times
Region	Release date	Format	Label
Denmark	14 August 2026	CD; LP; digital download; streaming	Universal
