= Home Movies (song) =

Single by Lukas Graham and Mickey Guyton

from the album 4 (The Pink Album)
- Released: 13 January 2023
- Length: 3:16
- Label: Warner
- Songwriters: David LaBrel; Jaramye Daniels; Nicolle Galyon; Rory Andrew
- Producers: Markus Artved; Rory Andrew; Brandon Beal; Karen Kosowski

Lukas Graham singles chronology
| "Wish You Were Here" (2022) | "Home Movies" (2023) | "Cheat Code" (2024) |

Mickey Guyton singles chronology
| "Cross Country" (2021) | "Home Movies" (2023) | "Nothing Compares to You" (2023) |

"Home Movies" is a song by Danish pop band Lukas Graham and American country singer Mickey Guyton. It was released on 13 January 2023 by Warner Records. The song was written by David LaBrel, Jaramye Daniels, Nicolle Galyon, and Rory Andrew. The song peaked at number 37 on the Danish Singles Chart.

== Background ==
In a statement, Lukas Forchhammer said, "'Home Movies' is a ballad, a duet that looks at life rather than love. The coincidence of boy meets girl and the retrospective understanding that life is lived in the present but understood backwards." He added, "We all have our inglorious moments and obscure pasts to deal with and that's what makes life so beautiful; when we manage to rise above the prejudice and make something unique of ourselves."

== Charts ==
| Chart (2023) | Peak position |
|---|---|
| Denmark (Tracklisten) | 37 |

== Certifications ==
| Region | Certification | Certified units/sales |
|---|---|---|
| Denmark (IFPI Danmark) | Gold | 45,000^{‡} |
^{‡} Sales+streaming figures based on certification alone.

== Release history ==
Release history for "Home Movies"
| Region | Date | Format | Label |
|---|---|---|---|
| Denmark | 13 January 2023 | Digital download; streaming | Warner |
