= Good Times, Bad Times (book) =

1983 book by Harold Evans

- Author: Harold Evans
- Language: English
- Publisher: Weidenfeld and Nicolson
- Publication date: 1983

Good Times, Bad Times is a book, published in 1983, that details Harold Evans' editorship of The Sunday Times and his short-lived editorship of The Times. Written shortly after his departure from The Times, it is particularly critical of the newspaper's owner, Rupert Murdoch. The allegations contained within the book resulted in questions being asked in Parliament. Critics regarded the book as well-written but partisan and were divided as to how convincing they found the arguments it contained. The book was re-issued in 2011 with an updated preface in the wake of the News International phone hacking scandal.

== Contents ==
Good Times, Bad Times can be thought of as divided into two sections, the good and bad times of the title. For Evans, the good times happened during his editorship of the Sunday Times under The Thomson Corporation. The bad times started in 1981 when News International purchased both the Sunday Times and The Times and Evans was persuaded to leave the Sunday Times in favour of editing The Times. The move was not a happy one and Evans left the paper in 1982. Evans combines a personal record of his editorship of both papers with his philosophy of journalism and a scathing attack on News International, Rupert Murdoch and the Conservative government.

The book details the Sunday Times campaign to ensure that the British victims of thalidomide were properly compensated. It also covers the paper's publication of uncensored portions of the diaries of Richard Crossman, a former Labour minister. The paper's reporting of the crash of Turkish Airlines Flight 981 outside Paris in 1974 and the subsequent investigations into its cause are covered, as are the investigations into Kim Philby's spying on his own government as part of the Cambridge Five.

Evans also relates his memories of the last days of the Sunday Times under the control of the Thomson Corporation. The book makes a number of accusations against Rupert Murdoch, News International and the Conservative government.

Evans suggests that Murdoch disliked him and wished to dispose of his services. Evans as editor of the Sunday Times was in a powerful position. According to Evans, Murdoch offered him the editorship of The Times, a more prestigious position but one where he was unfamiliar with the staff, making him vulnerable and easier to remove from the organisation altogether.

== Response ==
=== Politicians ===
Evans' accusations that John Biffen had misled Parliament concerning the financial position of The Sunday Times immediately before Rupert Murdoch's purchase of the paper led to questions being asked on the floor of the House of Commons. Biffen strongly denied partiality adding, in a written answer to the House, that "I do not consider that the material in Mr. Harold Evans' recent book "Good Times, Bad Times" adds significantly to the information available to me or my advisers at the time of the decision".

=== News International ===
News International stated that it had not been involved with either the preparation or interpretation of figures concerning the financial position of either The Times or the Sunday Times. Both News International and Times Newspapers rejected Evans' allegations that they had attempted to procure government employment for him from the Prime Minister. Times Newspapers also rejected the allegations that minutes from an important board meeting had been falsified.

=== Critics ===
Arnold Kemp of the Glasgow Herald called Good Times, Bad Times, "an honest and passionate book, written in anger, as readable as a thriller". Writing in the Pittsburgh Post-Gazette, Wil Haygood called the book "emotional, yet solid". He described it as "a telling inside look at Rupert Murdoch's style of publishing and...worthwhile reading". R. W. Apple Jr., writing in the New York Times, called it "an engrossing and cautionary tale". Christopher Lehmann-Haupt, also of the New York Times, found the book strongly reminiscent of Indecent Exposure, an account of power struggles within the film company Columbia Pictures Industries. However, unlike Indecent Exposure, which was written by an outsider, the journalist David McClintick, Good Times, Bad Times was written by an insider. Lehmann-Haupt felt that "For all the integrity it manifests...it leaves one with the sense that Mr. Evans is serving his own cause even more fervently than that of honest journalism." Also writing in the New York Times, R. W. Apple Jr. called the book "unapologetically one-sided, a cry of pain from a proud man who thinks he was conned and is still too wounded to see the other side of the story".

Reviewers found Evans' argument that Murdoch had forced him out because he did not support Margaret Thatcher enough to be unconvincing. Lehmann-Haupt called it not "fully satisfying" and suggested that Evans had portrayed Murdoch as Iago, "a character of motiveless malignity". Critics were divided on whether or not they believed Evans' allegations that Murdoch had interfered with the editorial line of The Times. R. W. Apple Jr. regarded Evans' position as "seem[ingly] unassailable", however, writing in Time, Paul Gray said that Evans' case against Murdoch was "not wholly convincing", citing a lack of evidence.
