= Good Times: The Very Best of the Hits & the Remixes =

Compilation album by Chic & Sister Sledge
- Released: August 2, 2005
- Recorded: Compilation
- Genre: Disco / funk / R&B / jazz / samba
- Label: Warner Music
- Producer: Various

Good Times: The Very Best of the Hits & the Remixes is a two-disc compilation album, of recordings by American R&B bands Chic and Sister Sledge, released by Warner Music in 2005, an expanded re-release of 1999's single-disc compilation The Very Best of Chic & Sister Sledge. Disc one contains the original recordings made between the years 1973 and 1982, disc two extended versions and remixes dating from 1982 to 2005. (Note: track 1, disc 2.)

== Track listing ==
All tracks written by Bernard Edwards and Nile Rodgers unless otherwise noted.
Disc one:

1. "We Are Family" (7" Edit) - 3:24
  - Sister Sledge
2. "Le Freak" (7" Edit) - 3:31
  - Chic
3. "Good Times" (7" Edit) - 3:36
  - Chic
4. "Lost in Music" (7" Edit) - 3:19
  - Sister Sledge
5. "Everybody Dance" (7" Edit) - 4:08
  - Chic
6. "I Want Your Love" (7" Edit) - 3:21
  - Chic
7. "He's the Greatest Dancer" - 6:09
  - Sister Sledge
8. "Chic Cheer" - 4:36
  - Chic
9. "Dance, Dance, Dance (Yowsah, Yowsah, Yowsah)" (7" Edit) - 3:38
  - Chic
10. "My Forbidden Lover" - 4:34
  - Chic
11. "Thinking of You" - 4:26
  - Sister Sledge
12. "Hangin'" (7" Edit) - 3:34
  - Chic
13. "All American Girls" (Sledge, Walden, Willis) - 3:52
  - Sister Sledge
14. "Mama Never Told Me" (Bell, Hurtt) - 3:17
  - Sister Sledge
15. "My Feet Keep Dancing" (7" Edit) - 3:44
  - Chic
16. "Dancing on the Jagged Edge" (Bryant, Herring, McBroom) - 3:33
  - Sister Sledge
17. "Got to Love Somebody" (7" Edit) - 3:33
  - Sister Sledge
18. "Frankie" (Denny) - 3:52
  - Sister Sledge

Disc two:

1. "We Are Family" (N.B. Album version - listed as Sure Is Pure Remix) - 8:21
  - Sister Sledge
2. "I Want Your Love" (Stonebridge Remix) - 8:42
  - Chic
3. "Thinking of You" (Ramp Remix) - 7:25
  - Sister Sledge
4. "Hangin'" (Album version) - 5:12
  - Chic
5. "We Are Family" (Steve Anderson DMC Remix) - 8:09
  - Sister Sledge
6. "Lost in Music" (Sure Is Pure Remix) - 8:33
  - Sister Sledge
7. "He's the Greatest Dancer" (Brutal Bill Remix) - 5:29
  - Sister Sledge
8. "Good Times" (A Touch of Jazz Remix) - 5:15
  - Chic
9. "Jack le Freak" ("Le Freak", 1987 Remix, 12" Mix) - 8:22
  - Chic
10. "Megachic Medley: Le Freak/Everybody Dance/Good Times/I Want Your Love" - 7:27
  - Chic
