= Lukas Graham =

Danish pop band

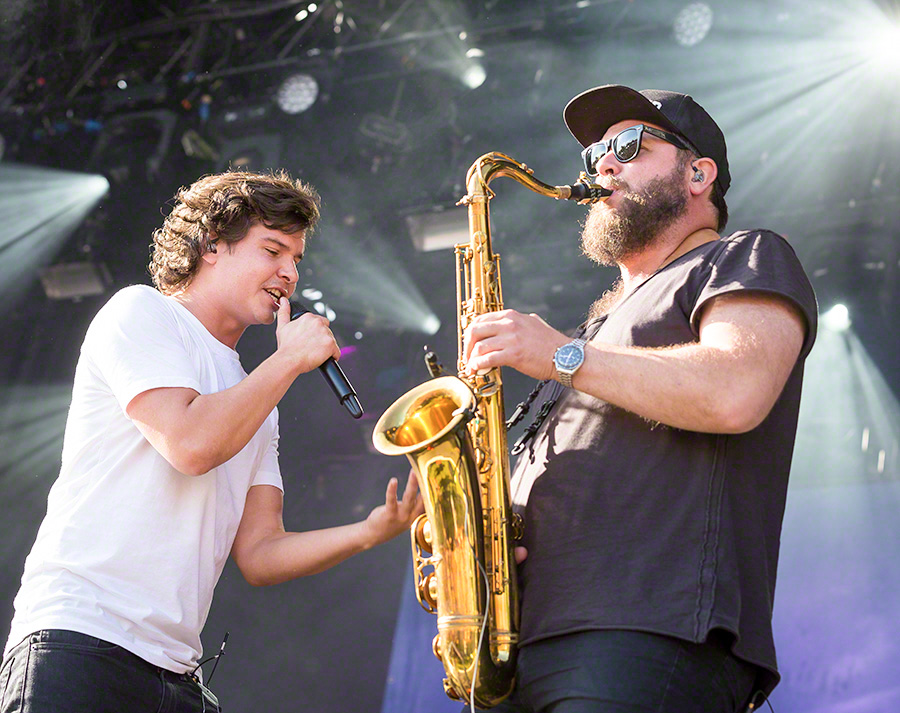
- Lukas Forchhammer (left) and Thomas Edinger (right) at the minor stage during Stavernfestivalen in July 2016

Background information
- Origin: Freetown Christiania, Copenhagen, Denmark
- Genres: Pop; soul; blue-eyed soul
- Years active: 2011–present
- Labels: Copenhagen; Warner; Then We Take the World; Universal
- Members: Lukas Forchhammer; Mark Falgren
- Past members: Anders Kirk; Kasper Daugaard; Magnus Larsson; Morten Ristorp
- Website: lukasgraham.com

Lukas Graham is a Danish pop band consisting of lead vocalist Lukas Forchhammer and drummer Mark Falgren. The band released their self-titled debut album, Lukas Graham, with record labels Copenhagen Records and Then We Take the World in 2012. The album peaked at number one on the Danish charts. Their self-titled second album was released in 2015 and earned international attention with singles like "Mama Said" and "7 Years", the latter of which topped the singles charts in many major music markets. The band's self-titled international debut album was released in the United States by Warner Bros. Records on 1 April 2016.

The band's third album, 3 (The Purple Album), was released in 2018. The album's lead single, "Love Someone", topped the Danish singles chart, while the second single, "Not a Damn Thing Changed", rose to number two. Their fourth album, 4 (The Pink Album), was released in 2023. Two of its singles, "Lie" and "Share That Love", ended up being certified two-times platinum in Denmark. Their fifth and most recent album, Good Times, was released in 2026. All three albums, like their self-titled predecessors, debuted at number one in Denmark.

== Career ==
=== 2011–2012: Career beginnings ===
The band formed in Denmark in 2011. and initially uploaded homemade videos of the songs "Drunk in the Morning" and "Criminal Mind". The songs were also shared on Facebook and accrued several hundred thousand views. The band signed a record deal in late 2011 with the Danish record label Copenhagen Records which is owned by Universal Music Denmark. In a later interview, Graham revealed that the band already had a contract with Copenhagen Records and the self-made videos were the label's idea to create an underground buzz.

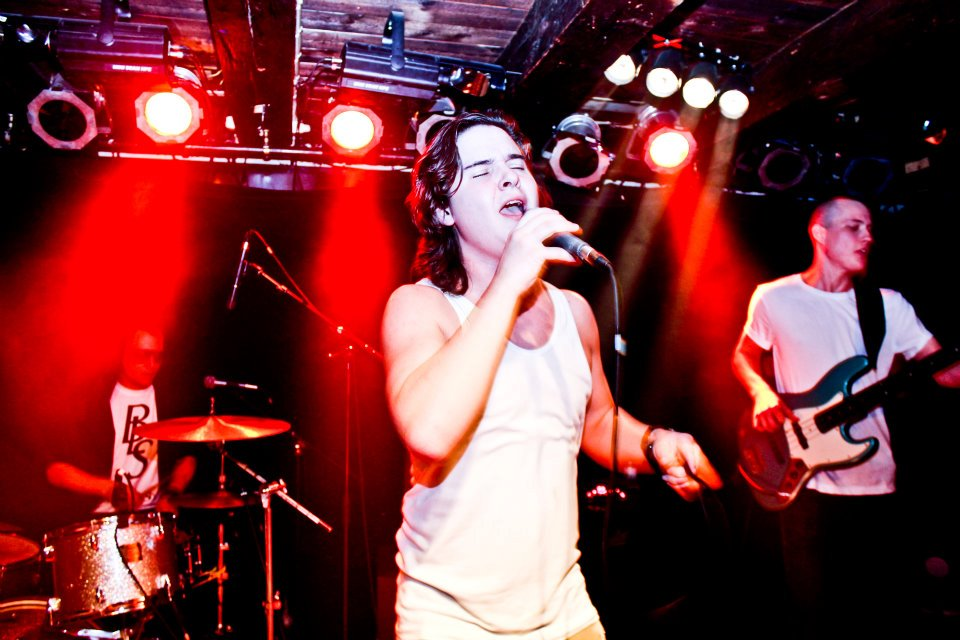
Lukas Graham performing in Copenhagen, 2011

Prior to officially releasing any music, the band had sold 17,000 tickets for an upcoming tour.

Their first release, Lukas Graham, which is available only in Europe and selected other nations, became certified seven-times platinum in Denmark. Their first release also featured four Danish charting songs: "Drunk in the Morning", "Criminal Mind", "Better Than Yourself (Criminal Mind Pt 2)" and "Ordinary Things". Over the course of 2012, Lukas Graham played 107 concerts throughout Europe, selling 40,000 tickets in Denmark alone. They sold 80,000 albums and 150,000 singles while also earning 5 million YouTube views and 27 million streams. Their tour took them across Europe to England, Netherlands, Norway, Sweden, Germany, Austria, France, and Spain.

=== 2013–2014: Continued touring and Warner Bros. Records deal ===
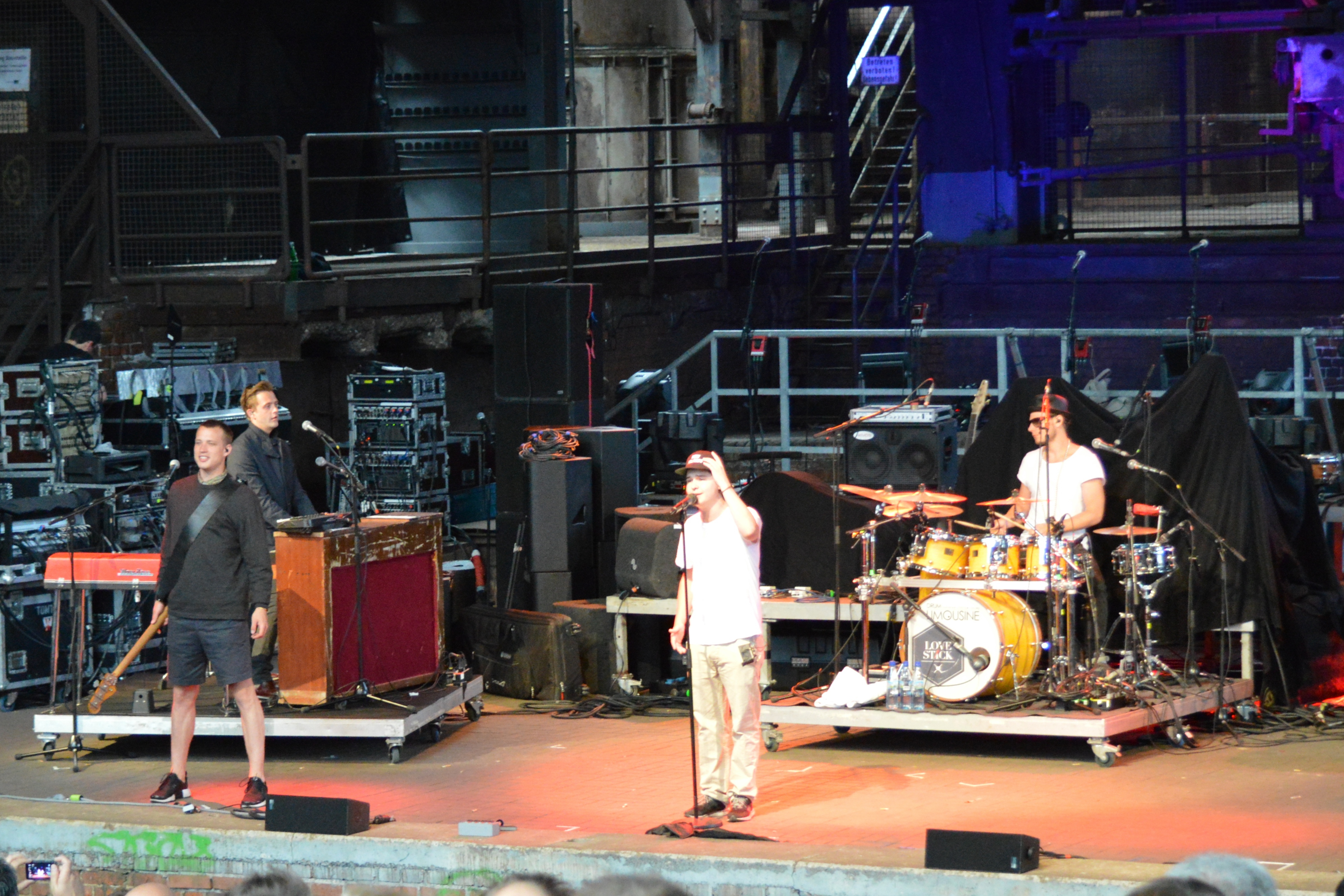
Lukas Graham performing at Traumzeit-Festival in 2013

In 2013, the band continued to tour throughout Europe. In the summer of 2013, the band was added to the bill of the Grøn Koncert (Green Concert) tour which is held in support of muscular dystrophy research. In October 2013, Lukas Graham won the European Border Breakers Award (EBBA) for their international tours in Europe.

In the fall of 2013, the band signed to Warner Bros. Records. The record company signed them with the intent of bringing their music to the United States. Starting in early 2014, the band spent extended periods of time in Los Angeles writing and recording what would become their U.S. debut. The band is still represented by Copenhagen Records in the Nordics, Germany, Switzerland, Austria, and France and is managed by Then We Take the World. In March 2014, Forchhammer himself contributed vocals to Hedegaard's Danish number-one single "Happy Home". Later in 2014, the band released their first single "Mama Said" off their upcoming album.

=== 2015–present: Worldwide debut, "7 Years" and international success ===
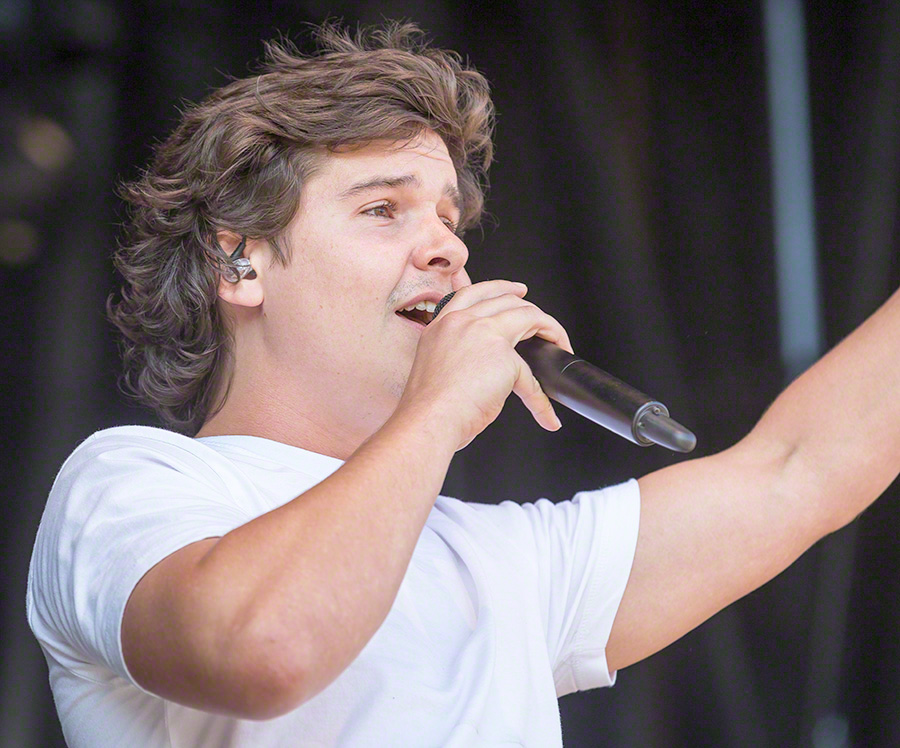
Forchhammer performing at Stavernfestivalen 2016

The band released their next record (often referred to as the "Blue Album") with Copenhagen Records and Then We Take The World solely in Denmark and several other mostly European nations in 2015. It peaked at number one in Denmark and made it onto several other Euro charts. It featured the singles "Mama Said", "Strip No More" and "7 Years", the last of which peaked at number one on the charts for Denmark, Italy, Austria, Belgium, and Sweden. The band made their United States television debut performing "7 Years" on a 10 December 2015 episode of Conan and the song peaked at number two on the Billboard Hot 100 list. In March 2016, Lukas Graham performed "7 Years" on Jimmy Kimmel Live!. The band has also performed the song on Late Night with Seth Meyers, The Ellen DeGeneres Show, The Late Late Show with James Corden, and Good Morning America.

By the end of March 2016, "7 Years" had achieved around 225 million total listens on Spotify worldwide with 17.2 million listeners per month, making the band the 20th most popular artist on the service. On 1 April 2016, the self-titled international debut was released in the United States by Warner Records|Warner Bros. Records. The US release of the album received new artwork, a reworked track listing, and a wider worldwide audience in countries including, Canada, Australia, the United Kingdom, and New Zealand. The album reached No. 3 on the Billboard 200, No. 2 in the UK and New Zealand, No. 1 in Australia and Canada, and No. 5 in Ireland. The band also embarked on a two-month long tour throughout the United States and Canada at the end of March 2016. Most dates on the tour sold out. As of December 2023, "7 Years" has over 1.74 billion Spotify streams.

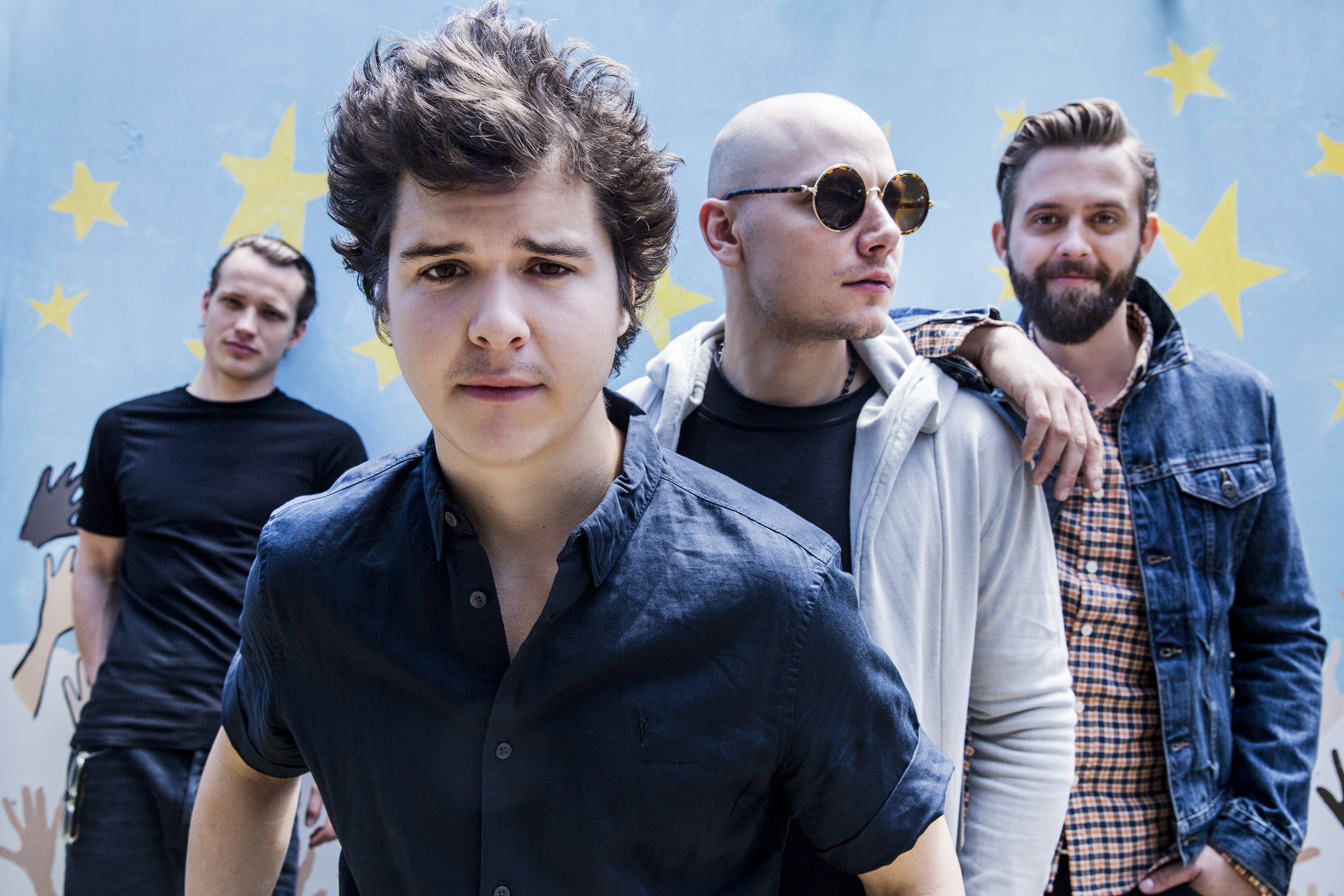
Lukas Graham in 2016. Kasper Daugaard (far right) left the band in June of that year.

In May 2016, the fourth single from the Blue Album, "You're Not There", was released. A month later, in June 2016, keyboardist Kasper Daugaard left the band. He was temporarily replaced by the band's producer and former keyboardist Morten Ristorp. In September 2016, the fifth and final single from the album, "Take the World by Storm", was released.

In December 2016, Lukas Graham was nominated for three Grammy Awards including Record of the Year and Song of the Year for "7 Years" and Best Pop Duo/Group Performance. "7 Years" was also nominated for Song of the Year at the 2016 BBC Music Awards where the band performed the song live on 12 December 2016.

In 2017, Graham performed the song "Off to See the World", featured on the soundtrack of My Little Pony: The Movie.

In September 2018, the band announced their third album 3 (The Purple Album), which was released on 26 October 2018 through Warner Bros. Records, and includes two singles: "Love Someone" and "Not a Damn Thing Changed". To promote the album, at the start of 2019, the band went on the Purple Tour, which included shows in Copenhagen and Herning. The two Copenhagen shows on the tour sold out in just nine minutes, after which the band added a third show in Copenhagen due to high demand.

On 20 February 2019, Lukas Graham performed as a guest artist on the third season of I Can See Your Voice Thailand. On 8 April 2019, Lukas Graham performed as a guest artist on the seventeenth season of American Idol during the second night of the "Top 20 Duets" episode. Forchhammer sang with contestants Eddie Island and Dimitrius Graham; both of which moved forward to the Top 14. In August 2019, Lukas Graham joined Spotify's Billions Club, after "7 Years" had reached one billion streams on the platform.

On 8 November 2019, Graham released an original Christmas song for the holidays, titled "Here (For Christmas)", which is about Forchhammer's late childhood friend, William. In January 2020, the band announced that bassist Magnus Larsson had left the band to focus on family, during which time he was also getting ready to welcome his first child.

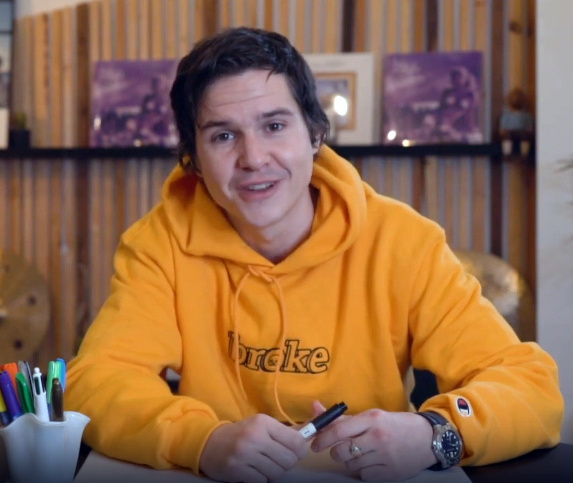
Forchhammer in 2020

In November 2020, a documentary film about the band, titled 7 Years of Lukas Graham, was released in Denmark. Directed by Danish filmmaker René Sascha Johannsen, the documentary follows frontman Forchhammer and the band's journey through the course of seven years, and events including their rise to national and international fame, as well as juggling the pressure of fame, the creative burden stemming from the death of Forchhammer's father, and Forchhammer becoming a father himself.

Throughout the courses of 2020 and 2021, the band collaborated with many artists including Wiz Khalifa, Branco, and R3hab, and released many standalone singles. One of those singles included "Scars", which was released at the start of the COVID-19 pandemic in March 2020. Forchhammer said of the single, "Scars come in many shapes and forms. The physical ones are often the easiest to deal with, while psychological scars can be very hard to cope with because no one can see them so we have to actively share them. We need to talk about these things in order to heal." "Scars", along with the band's 2021 singles "Happy for You" and "Call My Name", were certified gold in Denmark.

In 2022, Lukas Graham went on their In the Round Tour in Denmark, in partnership with renewable-technology company Vestas. The stage design was a 360-degree amphitheater-like stage, placed in the center of the venue, creating a more immersive and intimate experience. The tour was powered entirely by transportable batteries containing green electricity, in contrast to carbon-emitting diesel generators. The band played six shows on the tour, with shows in Copenhagen, Aalborg, Sønderborg, Odense, and Aarhus.

In November 2022, the band announced their fourth album 4 (The Pink Album), which was released on 20 January 2023 through Warner Bros. Records, which marked their first album since 2018's 3 (The Purple Album). The album was preceded by five singles: "Lie", "Share That Love", "All of It All", "Wish You Were Here", and "Home Movies". To promote the album, the band went on the Pink Tour, where they played 32 venues across Europe, including in Denmark, as well as festivals during the summer.

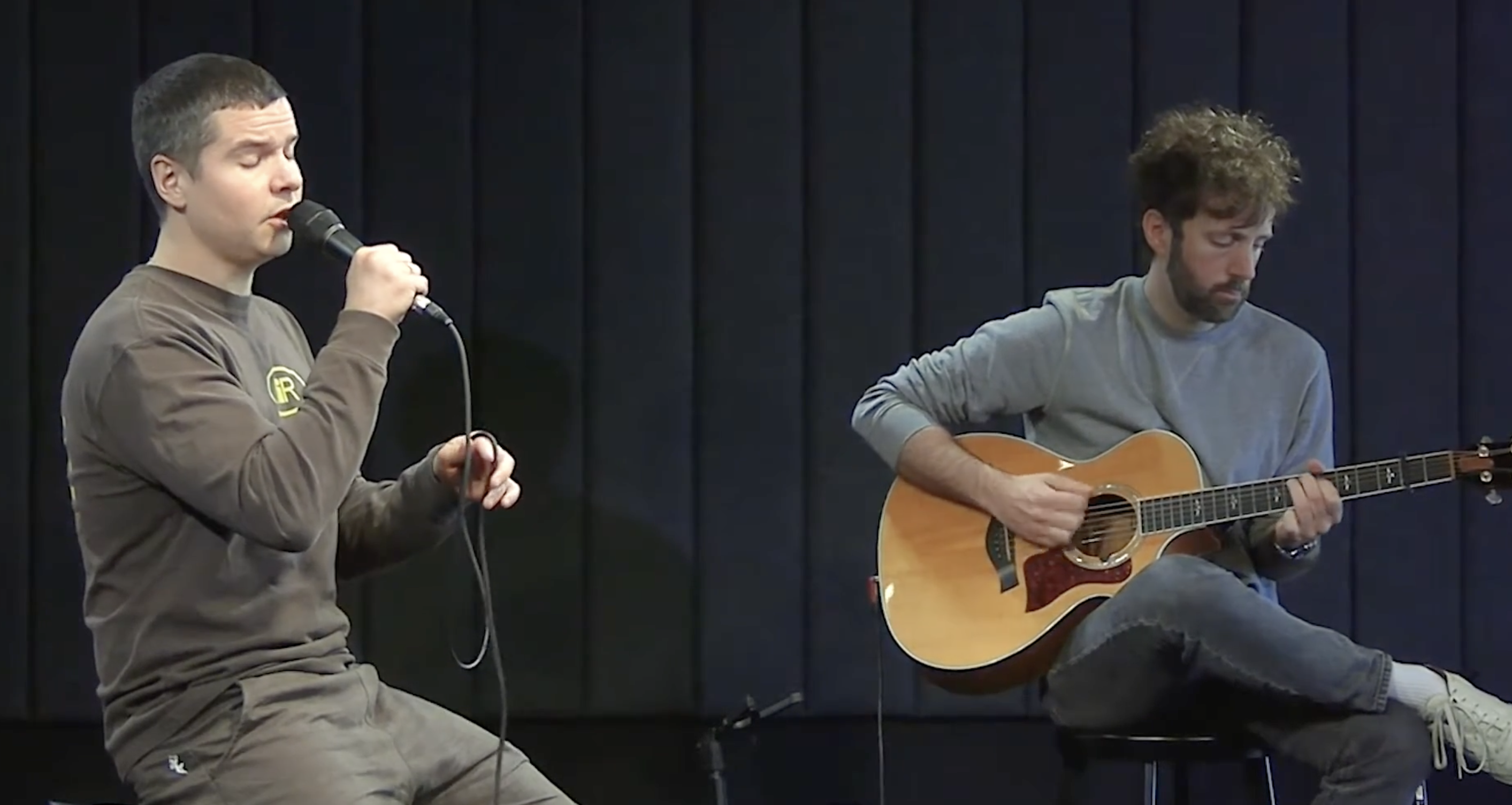
Lukas Graham performing in 2024

In 2025, Graham was revealed to be one of the opening acts on the North American leg of English singer-songwriter Ed Sheeran's Loop Tour, after frontman Forchhammer and Sheeran performed "7 Years" together, during one of Sheeran's four-night concerts in Copenhagen. On September 15, 2026, amidst the Macklemore–Ed Sheeran tour controversy, the band announced that they were withdrawing from the tour after American rapper Macklemore was removed from the tour due to his support of Palestine in the Israel-Palestine conflict.

In May 2026, Lukas Graham announced their fifth album Good Times, which was released on 14 August 2026. Good Times differentiates from the band's usual music style, switching out the pop-soul genre for folk-pop, with Forchhammer wanting to reconnect with his Irish roots he took after his late father, Eugene Graham, who was born in the town of Donegal. Forchhammer said he recorded the album with "people my dad knew. People who had slept on a couch in my mom and dad's living room. It was very important to me that we got a hold of some of these musicians and got that cultural connection." The album was preceded by four singles: "To Know a Girl", "Second Chance", the title track "Good Times", and "Before You Go".

== Musical style ==
Lukas Graham's music has been described as a pop-soul hybrid. In a review of the band's new album, journalist Jon Pareles of The New York Times described their sound as the place "where pop meets R&B". Patrick Ryan of USA Today wrote that the band's songs "effortlessly blend elements of hip hop and folk". Lyrically, the songs often deal with relatable experiences like growing up poor ("Mama Said") or drinking ("Drunk in the Morning"). The band's most popular song, "7 Years", describes growing up and aging at specific points in life (from seven years old to 60).

Forchhammer grew up in the self-governing anarchist community of Christiania in Denmark. The area is known for its creative atmosphere, relative poverty and crime. His experiences growing up in the community have shaped both the sound of his music and the lyrics he writes.

During live performances, Graham is joined by a horn section named The Rusty Trombones.

== Band members ==
Current

- Lukas Forchhammer – lead vocals (2011–present)
- Mark "Lovestick" Falgren – drums, percussion, backing vocals (2011–present)

Former

- Anders Kirk – piano, keyboards (2011)
- Morten Ristorp – piano, keyboards (2011–12, 2016, studio 2012–present)
- Kasper Daugaard – piano, keyboards, backing vocals (2012–16, touring 2021–2022)
- Magnus Larsson – bass, backing vocals (2011–2019)

Touring

- Lars Vissing – trumpet (2012–present)
- Nikolai Bøgelund – trombone (2012–present)
- Thomas Edinger – saxophone (2012–present)
- Will Herrington – piano, keyboards, backing vocals (2016–2020)
- Jon Sosin – guitar (2018–2020)
- Emil Falk – guitar (2020)
- Henrik Møller – bass (2020–present)
- Andreas Lund – guitar (2021–present)
- David Maemone – piano, keyboards (2022–2023)
- Andreas Stigkær – piano, keyboards (2023–present)

Timeline

== Discography ==
- Lukas Graham (2012)
- Lukas Graham (2015)
- 3 (The Purple Album) (2018)
- 4 (The Pink Album) (2023)
- Good Times (2026)

== Awards and nominations ==
Year	Award	Category	Nominee	Result
2012	Danish Music Awards	New Danish Name of the Year	Lukas Graham	Won
2012	Danish Music Awards	Audience Prize of the Year	Lukas Graham	Nominated
2012	Danish Music Awards	Band of the Year	Lukas Graham	Nominated
2012	Danish Music Awards	Male Artist of the Year	Lukas Graham	Nominated
2012	Danish Music Awards	Newcomer of the Year	Lukas Graham	Nominated
2012	Danish Music Awards	Songwriter of the Year	Lukas Graham	Nominated
2012	Danish Music Awards	Best Pop Album	Lukas Graham	Nominated
2014	Music Moves Europe Award	European Border Breakers Awards	Lukas Graham	Won
2015	MTV Europe Music Awards	Best Danish Act	Lukas Graham	Won
2015	MTV Europe Music Awards	Best European Act	Lukas Graham	Nominated
2016	MTV Video Music Awards	Best New Artist	Lukas Graham	Nominated
2016	MTV Europe Music Awards	Best New Act	Lukas Graham	Nominated
2016	MTV Europe Music Awards	Best Push Act	Lukas Graham	Nominated
2016	MTV Europe Music Awards	Best Danish Act	Lukas Graham	Nominated
2016	MTV Europe Music Awards	Best Song	"7 Years"	Nominated
2016	BBC Music Awards	Song of the Year	"7 Years"	Nominated
2016	LOS40 Music Awards	International New Artist of the Year	Lukas Graham	Nominated
2016	Teen Choice Awards	Choice Summer Song	"7 Years"	Nominated
2017	Grammy Awards	Record of the Year	"7 Years"	Nominated
2017	Grammy Awards	Song of the Year	"7 Years"	Nominated
2017	Grammy Awards	Best Pop Duo/Group Performance	"7 Years"	Nominated
2017	iHeartRadio Music Awards	Best Lyrics	"7 Years"	Nominated
2017	iHeartRadio Music Awards	Best New Pop Artist	Lukas Graham	Nominated
2017	Kids' Choice Awards	Best New Artist	Lukas Graham	Nominated
2017	Billboard Music Awards	Top New Artist	Lukas Graham	Nominated
2017	ASCAP Pop Awards	Winning Song	"7 Years"	Won
2020	BMI Pop Awards	Winning Song	"Love Someone"	Won
