= Lukas Forchhammer =

Danish musician

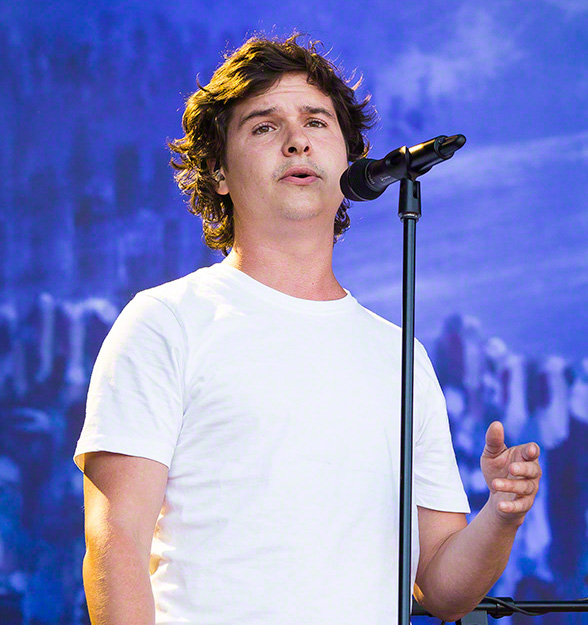
- Forchhammer performing in 2016
- Born: 18 September 1988 (age 38); Christiania, Denmark
- Occupations: Singer; songwriter; actor (formerly)
- Years active: 1991–1996; 2011–present
- Spouse: Marie-Louise Schwartz (m. 2021)
- Children: 3
- Musical career
- Genres: Pop; soul; blue-eyed soul; funk
- Labels: Copenhagen; Warner Bros.; Then We Take The World
- Website: lukasgraham.com

Lukas Forchhammer (born 18 September 1988) is a Danish singer, songwriter, and former actor. He is best known as the lead singer for the Danish band Lukas Graham. As a child, Forchhammer starred in the Danish family movie series Krummerne.

== Early life and career ==
Forchhammer was born on 18 September 1988, to Eva Forchhammer and Eugene Graham, and grew up in Freetown Christiania, a self-governing anarchist community in Denmark. His father, Eugene, was Irish, and he spent half of his childhood in Ireland in Donegal and Dublin. His grandfather, Jimmy Graham, was from Wicklow in Ireland. In September 2012, Eugene died of a heart attack at the age of 61.

At age 8, Forchhammer joined the Copenhagen Boys Choir and then developed an appreciation for classical music and a trained voice. He became fascinated with his father's Irish roots, the country's folk music, as well as hip-hop, saying "Dr. Dre's 2001 changed my life." He related to rap lyrics as he grew up surrounded by a lot of crime and drugs in his neighborhood. After spending six months in Buenos Aires, Forchhammer returned to Christiania in 2010, where he joined the writing team Future Animals – Don Stefano and Morten Ristorp – and formed the band Lukas Graham with friends from high school in 2011. He and Lukas Graham performed at the 59th Annual Grammy Awards on 12 February 2017.

As a child, he also starred in the first three of the popular Danish movies Krummerne, where he played Grunk. In addition to acting, he has provided Danish voice dubbing for a number of animated films, including Andy in Toy Story 2 and Toy Story 3, and Christopher Robin in Piglet's Big Movie (Danish: Grislings Store Eventyr).

== Personal life ==
In September 2016, Forchhammer and his then-girlfriend Marie-Louise “Rillo” Schwartz had their first child, a daughter. On 16 January 2019, Forchhammer and Schwartz publicly announced their engagement. In April 2020, their second daughter was born. A year later, Forchhammer and Schwartz secretly got married in a private wedding on 15 July 2021. In September 2024, their third daughter was born.

== Filmography ==
=== Film ===
- Krummerne (1991)
- Krummerne 2: Stakkels Krumme (1992)
- Krummerne 3 - fars gode idé (1994)
- Toy Story 2 (1999)
- Toy Story 3 (2010)
- 7 Years of Lukas Graham (2020)

=== Television ===
- Krummernes Jul (1996)
