= Jon Nørgaard discography =

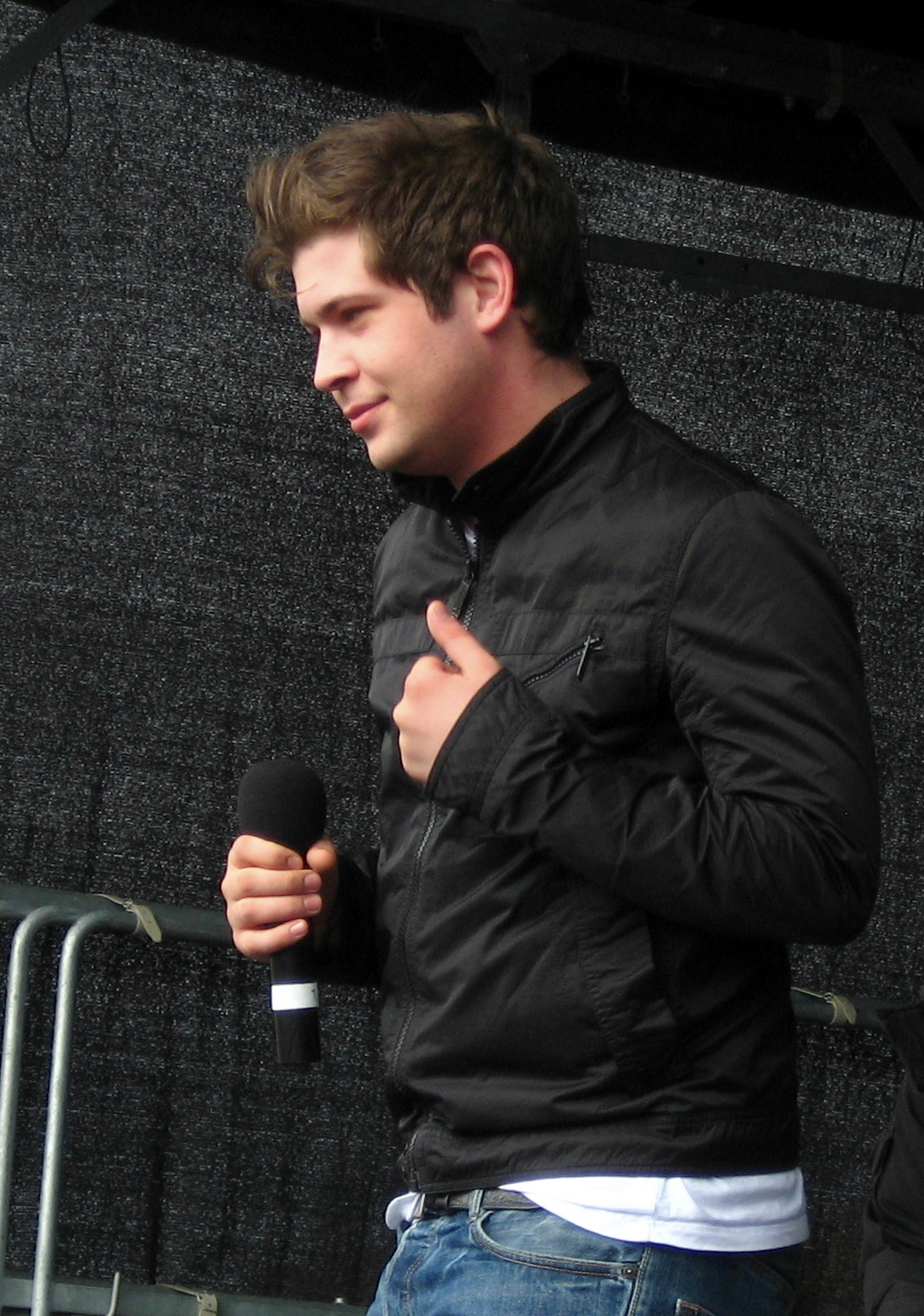
- Studio albums: 2
- Singles: 8

The discography of Danish singer Jon Nørgaard comprises two studio albums and eight singles.

In 2003, he released his debut album This Side Up, written by Søren Rasted. The album sold 135,000 copies and resulted in two successful singles, "Right Here Next to You" and "This Side Up". The album was also reissued in an international edition in 2003. In 2004, under the alias John Rock, he began a successful collaboration with house duo Musikk with a number of #1 singles on the Danish Dance Chart. Among the hits was a cover version of the Climie Fisher song "Love Changes (Everything)"; it peaked to #2 on the Danish Singles Chart. In 2005, Nørgaard returned as a solo artist with the single "Popstar", which was written by Swedish singer Robyn. That same year he released his second solo studio album Today is a Good Day (To Fall in Love). He released his solo Danish language single in May 2007, entitled "Lidt endnu" (meaning Just yet). In August 2007 landed a job as a radio host on commercial station Radio ABC in the program Mads og Jon. In 2010, Nørgaard appeared on Kato's hit single "Turn the Lights Off" from the album Discolized. He also collaborated with Clemens in the hit "Champion", reaching the top of the Danish Singles Chart. In March 2011, Nørgaard released "Dine Øjne", reaching number 14 on the Danish Singles Chart. In June 2011, he released "Fester Kun Med Mig Selv", reaching number 39 on the Danish Singles Chart. He features in the single "Vi Ejer Natten" with Clemens and Hedegaard, which was released in December 2011; it entered the Danish Singles Chart at number 14. His third solo album, Ved Siden Af Dig, will be released on 12 February 2012.

== Albums ==
Title	Album Details	Peak chart positions
Title	Album Details	DEN
This Side Up	Released: 2003; Label: EMI; Format: CD	1
Today Is a Good Day (To Fall in Love)	Released: 2005; Label: Transistor Music; Format: CD	—
Uden dig	Released: 21 February 2012; Label: Transistor Music; Format: CD	—

== Singles ==
=== As lead artist ===
Year	Single	Peak chart positions	Album
Year	Single	DEN	Album
2002	"Right Here Next to You"	1	This Side Up
2003	"This Side Up"	11	This Side Up
2003	"Endlessly"	—	This Side Up
2005	"Popstar"	8	Today Is a Good Day (To Fall in Love)
2006	"Hurry Up Live"	—	Today Is a Good Day (To Fall in Love)
2008	"Every Girl I've Wanted"	—	Today Is a Good Day (To Fall in Love)
2011	"Dine Øjne"	14	Uden dig
2011	"Fester Kun Med Mig Selv"	39	Uden dig
2012	"Mød Mig I Mørket"	—	Single

=== As featured artist ===
Year	Single	Peak chart positions		Album
Year	Single	DEN	SWE	Album
2004	"Summer Lovin'" (Musikk feat. John Rock)	7	—	
2004	"Love Changes (Everything)" (Musikk feat. John Rock)	2	—	
2009	"The Way You Kiss" (Remedy feat. Jon)	—	—	
2009	"Honestly" (Remedy feat. Jon)	—	—	
2010	"Turn the Lights Off" (Kato feat. Jon)	4	6	Discolized
2010	"Champion" (Clemens feat. Jon Nørgaard)	1	—	
2011	"Vi Ejer Natten" (Clemens, Hedegaard & Jon Nørgaard)	14	—	

=== Other songs ===
Year	Single	Album
2007	"Lidt Endnu"	Non-album single
