= Alexander Perls =

American composer and music producer

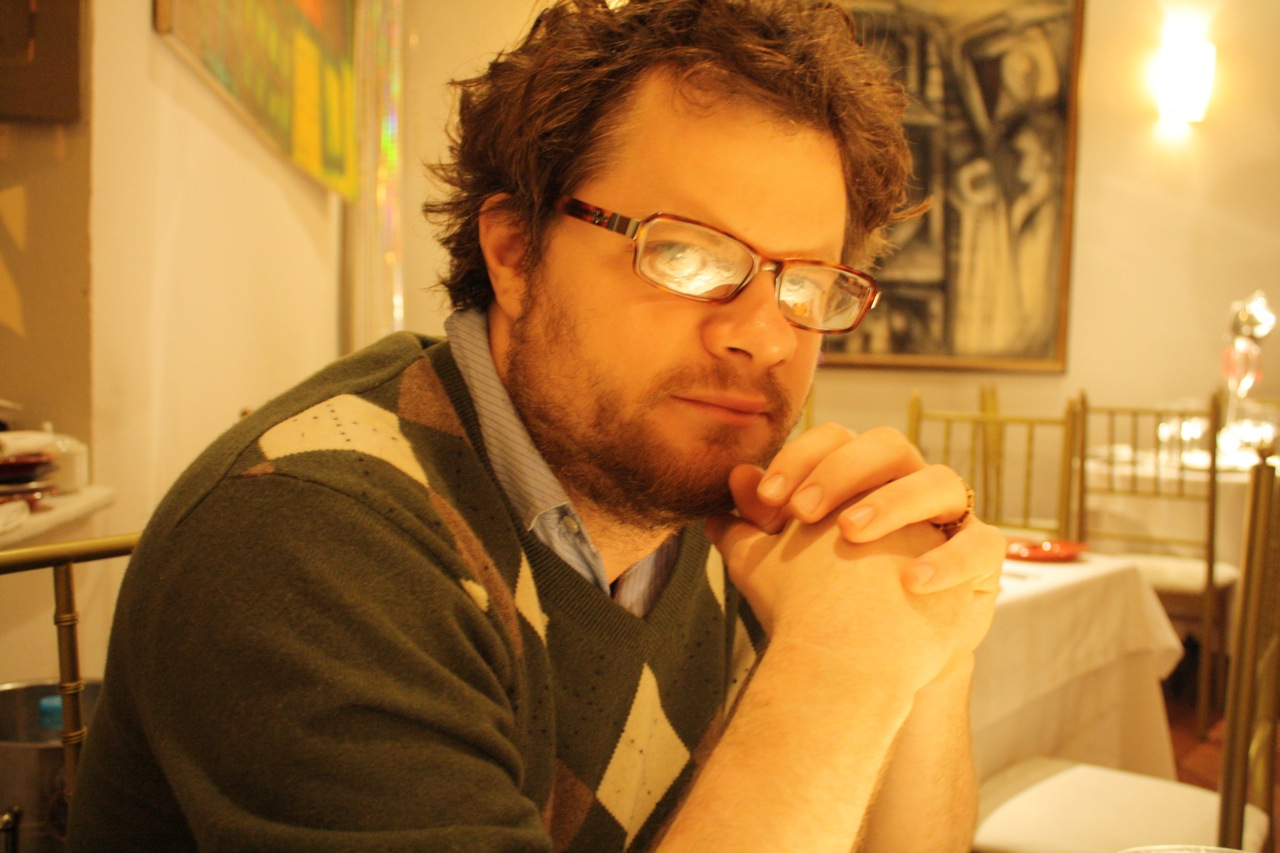
- Perls in 2008
- Born: Alexander Perls Rousmaniere; May 11, 1976 (age 50)
- Education: Concord Academy (1990–94); Oberlin College (B.A. History, 1994–98)
- Occupations: DJ; Musician/songwriter; music producer
- Notable work: 009 Sound System; Aalborg Soundtracks
- Spouse: Sonia Boyajian (married 2008)
- Children: 2
- Musical career
- Origin: Boston, Massachusetts
- Genres: Electronica; electronic rock; house; trance
- Years active: 1998–2012 (as a musician)
- Label: Track One Recordings (defunct c.2013)
- Formerly of: Circ; Piano Magic; Icebreaker International
- Website: www.alexanderperls.com

Alexander Perls Rousmaniere (born May 11, 1976) is an American former musician, DJ, entrepreneur, and record producer. His songs are known for their mix of electronic, trance, and religiously themed lyrics and are entirely written, performed, and produced by Perls; notable projects include 009 Sound System and Aalborg Soundtracks.

== Early life and education ==
Perls grew up in Boston, Massachusetts, culminating in an education at Concord Academy. While studying at University College London in 1997, Perls worked with the post-rock collective Piano Magic.

Following Perls' graduation from Oberlin College in 1998, he began working for the Barbara Gladstone Gallery, a leading contemporary art dealership in New York. The following year he co-founded NATOarts, which (according to its charter) sought to "promote global security and stability through the exhibition of works of conceptual art." The government support for the organization was terminated in the early days of the George W. Bush administration, ultimately leading to a decision to focus on a career as a songwriter.

== Music career ==
Between 1999 and 2004, Perls collaborated with producer Simon Break in an electro-acoustic duo called Icebreaker International. They released 3 albums together, as part of their NATOarts project, which sought to "promote economic globalisation and free international trade".

Between 2000 and 2008, Perls primarily composed music for European dance music artists, including David Guetta, Paul van Dyk, Ian Carey, ATB, and Robert M. He also provided vocals for Cosmic Gate on their album Earth Mover. first in New York City, and after 2006, in Los Angeles. From 2000 to 2003, he was one of the members of the electronic music duo Circ, which released one album, Love Electric, and several singles and remixes.

Between 2002 and 2004, Perls' music publishing catalog was represented by Bug Music. Beginning in 2004, his catalog was represented outside the United States by the Independent Music Group, and since 2011 has been represented internationally by Kobalt Music Group.

In 2011, Track One Recordings opened a remix competition for Perls' productions "Dreamscape" and "Born to Be Wasted".

Perls' song "Wings" was commissioned to be the theme song for the "Wings Flying Hoodie," a sweatshirt with a built in inflatable travel pillow and eye mask.

=== YouTube ===
As a consequence of YouTube introducing a system called AudioSwap on February 22, 2007, which replaces the audio of copyrighted soundtracks with a different, Creative Commons licensed song, several songs from Perls under his 009 Sound System project, particularly "Dreamscape", "With a Spirit", "Space and Time", "Born to Be Wasted", "Holy Ghost", and "Trinity," became widely prominent on many YouTube videos. Because the artists were alphabetically sorted, 009 Sound System songs were placed at the top of the AudioSwap list, leading them to be chosen by many users.

In 2025, a 2010 song that Perls wrote, "Turn the Lights Off" performed by Danish DJ Kato and singer Jon Nørgaard, went viral due to a meme of Jon Hamm's character in Your Friends & Neighbors dancing in a club. This resulted in the song charting globally.

== Personal life ==
Perls is married to Los Angeles jewelry designer Sonia Boyajian.

Perls is CEO of the Los Angeles software company Ezvid. Its eponymous flagship product, a freeware video maker for Windows, includes several of Perls' songs under the artist names "009 Sound System" and "Aalborg Soundtracks" as free soundtracks for users' projects.

== Discography ==
Albums

- 009 Sound System (2009)
- Annex Trax, Vol. 1 (2008)
- The Hits (2010)

Singles

- "Maximalist" (2002)
- "Storm" (2003)
- "Dreamscape" (2008)
- "Space and Time" (2009)
- "Born to Be Wasted" (2009)
- "Music and You" (2007)
- "Trinity" (2009)
- "Beat of the Moment" (2008)
- "Holy Ghost" (2008)
- "Shine Down" (2008)
- "Sweet Mary" (2008)
- "The Dark Empire" (2008)
- "The Hero Waits" (2008)
- "With a Spirit" (2009)
- "Speak to Angels" (2009)
- "Killer With a Thousand Faces" (2009)
- "Shine Down" (2009)
- "High All Day" (2010)
- "Violate" (2010)
- “When You’re Young” (2011)
- "Dream We Knew" (2011)
- "Powerstation" (2011)
- "Wings" (2011)
- "Holiday" (2011)
- "Sweet Mary" (2011)

== Movies ==
- Sky Fighters (2005) French: Les Chevaliers du ciel (original title)
- Return2Sender (2005) - composer
- Suicide Room (2011) Polish: Sala samobójców (original title) - soundtrack lyricist
