= This Side Up =

This Side Up may refer to:

- This Side Up (Scream album), 1985
- This Side Up (David Benoit album), 1986
- This Side Up (Jon album), 2002
- "This Side Up" (song), a 2003 single by Danish singer Jon Nørgaard

== See also ==
- This Way Up (disambiguation)
