= In Control (EliZe album) =

Studio album by EliZe
- Released: October 6, 2006
- Recorded: Denmark; 2004-2006
- Genres: Pop, dance, Europop
- Label: CMM
- Producers: Peter Hartmann, Jan Langhoff, Ahmad Darwich, RedOne

EliZe chronology
In Control (2006)	More Than Meets the Eye (2009)

Singles from In Control
- 1. "Shake" Released: October 18, 2004; 2. "Automatic (I'm Talking to You)" Released: March 7, 2005; 3. "I'm No Latino" Released: August 22, 2005; 4. "Into Your System" Released: June 2, 2006; 5. "Itsy Bitsy Spider" Released: October 5, 2006

In Control is the first full-length studio album by the Dutch pop and dance singer EliZe, released on October 6, 2006, in the Netherlands. In 2007, it was released in Japan as a special edition with bonus tracks.

== Track listing ==
1. "Shake"
2. "Itsy Bitsy Spider"
3. "Let's Dance"
4. "I'm No Latino"
5. "Bodytalk"
6. "Automatic (I'm Talking to You)"
7. "Rhythm of Love"
8. "Come Along"
9. "Into Your System"
10. "Sexually Healing"
11. "100%"

== Japanese edition ==
1. "Automatic (DJ Uto Remix)"
2. "Into Your System (Shiny☆Mix)"
3. "100%"
4. "Let's Dance"
5. "Shake"
6. "Automatic"
7. "Into Your System"
8. "Itsy Bitsy Spider"
9. "I'm No Latino"
10. "Come Along"
11. "Bodytalk"
12. "Rhythm Of Love"
13. "Sexually Healing"

== Singles ==
- "Shake" was the first single of In Control. When released on October 18, 2004, the single entered the Dutch Top 40 at #36 and peaked at number #32.
- "Automatic (I'm Talking To You)" was the second single to be released, on March 7, 2005. It is EliZe's most successful song to date. It spent a total of 13 weeks in the Dutch chart and peaked at #7.
- "I'm No Latino" was the third single from In Control, released on August 22, 2005. It reached number #14 in the Dutch Top 40.
- "Into Your System" was the fourth single, released on June 2, 2006. The single entered the Dutch Top 40 at #33 and peaked at number #18.
- "Itsy Bitsy Spider" was the final single from this album. It failed to enter the Dutch Top 40 chart and peaked at #5 in the Tipparade.

== Chart performance ==
Peak
position
66
