= More Than Meets the Eye =

More Than Meets the Eye may refer to:

== Literature ==
- More Than Meets the Eye, a 1980 novel by Jeanne Betancourt
- More Than Meets the Eye, a 2002 novel by Carla Cassidy
- Transformers: More Than Meets the Eye, a 2003 Transformers comic book series published by Dreamwave Productions
- The Transformers: More Than Meets the Eye, a 2012 Transformers comic book series published by IDW Publishing

== Music ==
- More Than Meets the Eye (album), an album by EliZe
- More Than Meets the Eye (EP), an EP by Napalm Death, or the title song
- "More Than Meets the Eye" (song), a song by Europe
- "More Than Meets the Eye", a song by Testament from The Formation of Damnation

== Television ==
- "More Than Meets the Eye", the 1984 three-part series premiere of the American animated television series The Transformers
