= Lovesick (EliZe song) =

Single by EliZe

from the album More Than Meets the Eye
- Released: May 26, 2008
- Recorded: 2008
- Genre: Electronic, pop
- Length: 3:15
- Label: Spinnin' Records
- Songwriters: Nanna Martorell; Tony Cornelissen
- Producer: Beatfreakz

EliZe singles chronology
"Itsy Bitsy Spider" (2006)	"Lovesick" (2008)	"Hot Stuff" (2008)

"Lovesick" is the sixth single by Dutch singer EliZe. The song is taken from her second album entitled More Than Meets the Eye. The single reached number #31 in the Dutch Top 40 and peaked at #15 in the Dutch Single Top 100. The single had its most success in Bulgaria, where it reached the #1 position in the national Top 40 and stayed there for six weeks.

== Track listing ==
1. "Lovesick" [Beatfreakz radio edit] – 3:13
2. "Lovesick" [Beatfreakz club mix] – 5:29
3. "Lovesick" [8Ball radio edit] – 3:08
4. "Lovesick" [8Ball club mix] – 5:56

== Charts ==
Chart (2008)	Peak position
Dutch Top 40	31
Dutch Single Top 100	15
Bulgarian Top 40	1

== Personnel ==
- Written by Nanna Martorell and Tony Cornelissen
- Produced by Beatfreakz
- Mixed by Robin M
- Backing Vocals by EliZe and Nienke van den Berg
- Photography by Mike van den Toorn
- Artwork by Red Melon
- Video directed by Jonathan Weyland
