= EliZe =

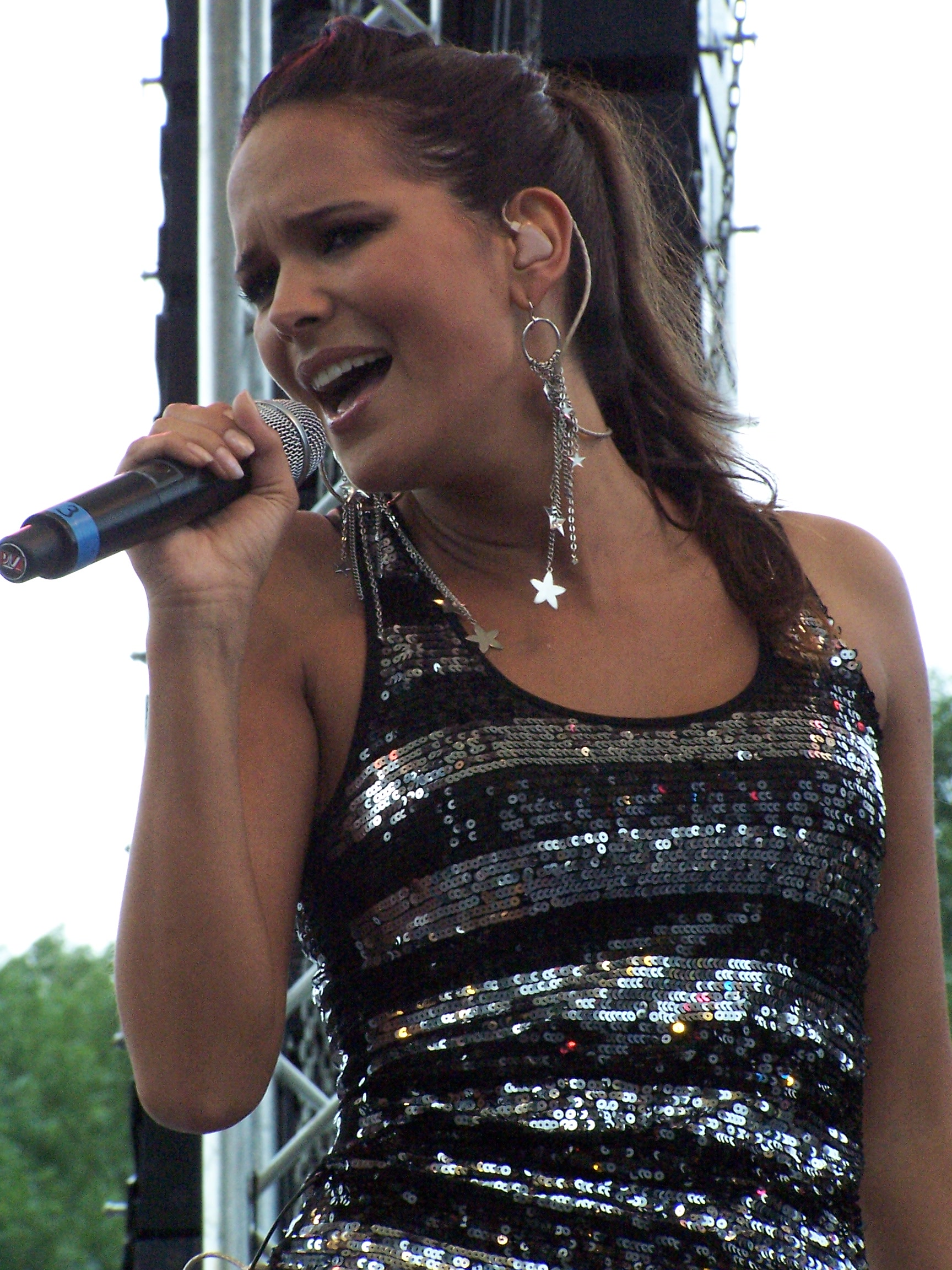
- EliZe (2007)

Background information
- Born: Elise van der Horst; 22 July 1982 (age 44); Utrecht, Netherlands
- Genres: Pop, dance, Europop, urban pop, Latin pop
- Occupation: Singer
- Years active: 1991–present
- Label: Spinnin' Records

Elise van der Horst (born 22 July 1982), better known as EliZe, is a Dutch singer. In 2010 she moved to Los Angeles, California.

== Career ==
As an eight-year-old she was selected to sing in a children's television show, Kinderen voor Kinderen ("Children for Children"), in which she performed for six years. Her last performance on Kinderen voor Kinderen was the famous tietenlied ("tits song"). After that she joined "Non Stop", a teenage choir, and participated in two amateur productions of the musicals Chicago and Les Misérables.

In 2004, EliZe recorded an album in Denmark. The songs were written and produced by Peter Hartmann and Jan Langhoff, who also worked with Aqua. The first single, "Shake", was released in 2004 in the Netherlands. Though the song received the title "Dancesmash!" by Radio 538, the single was a modest hit by peaking at number 32 on the Dutch Top 40. "Automatic (I'm Talking to You)", the second single, was released in 2005 in the Netherlands and also earned the title "Dancesmash!" shortly after its release. The song became her signature song, peaking at number 7 there and becoming her best-selling single to date. It is also the first song that has ever charted outside the Netherlands, charting in Finland and Belgium amongst others in the top 20. Her third single, "I'm No Latino", was released in August 2005, and became a TMF Superclip shortly after its introduction. The song did not perform as well as "Automatic" did, but still managed to peak at number 14 on the Dutch Top 40 and to remain in the chart for 6 weeks.

In 2006 her single "Into Your System" peaked at number 18 in the Dutch Top 40. Following the success of its singles, EliZe released her long-awaited debut album In Control on 29 September 2006 in the Netherlands. The album peaked at number 66 in the Dutch Mega Album Top 100. It was followed by the single "Itsy Bitsy Spider", featuring rapper Jay Colin. It did not perform well in the charts.

In May 2008, she released the first single of her second album, "Lovesick." In Bulgaria she scored a No. 1 hit with it and kept the top position for 6 weeks. This marked her second No. 1 hit in that country. The following singles were "Hot Stuff", a cover version from Donna Summer's song, and "Can't You Feel It?". Her second album More Than Meets the Eye was released on 26 June 2009 in the Netherlands.

In 2007, EliZe hosted the Dutch version of the TV show "Kids Top 20" and won a Nickelodeon Kids' Choice Award for Best Singer while up against Netherlands' No. 1 singer Marco Borsato and Hilary Duff. In 2008 EliZe hosted the first season of the Dutch version of the internationally acclaimed TV show "So You Think You Can Dance".

In 2009, EliZe was voted Holland's Most desirable single woman by winning the Single & Famous Award.

== Discography ==
=== Albums ===
In Control

- Released: 6 October 2006 (Netherlands)
- Label: CMM
- Producer: Peter Hartmann, Jan Langhoff, Ahmad Darwich, RedOne
- Chart position: #66 NL
- Singles: "Shake", "Automatic", "I'm No Latino", "Into Your System", "Itsy Bitsy Spider"

More Than Meets the Eye

- Released: 26 June 2009 (Netherlands)
- Label: Spinnin' Records
- Producer: Sir Harry, Stuart Anning, Ben Robbins, Right Bank, Hi tack, Beatfreakz, Future presidents, Bas van den Heuvel
- Singles: "Lovesick", "Hot Stuff", "Can't You Feel It?", "I Can Be A Bitch"

=== Singles ===
Year	Title	Chart positions							Album
Year	Title	NL 40	NL 100	GER	BEL	FRA	FIN	BUL	Album
2004	"Shake"	32	32	-	-	-	-	-	In Control
2005	"Automatic (I'm Talking to You)"	7	8	63	18	67	11	7	In Control
2005	"I'm No Latino"	14	11	-	39	-	-	1	In Control
2006	"Into Your System"	18	15	-	-	-	-	2	In Control
2006	"Itsy Bitsy Spider"	-	54	-	-	-	-	-	In Control
2008	"Lovesick"	31	15	-	-	-	-	1	More Than Meets the Eye
2008	"Hot Stuff"	27	11	-	-	-	-	19	More Than Meets the Eye
2009	"Can't You Feel It"	-	65	-	-	-	-	-	More Than Meets the Eye
2009	"I Can Be a Bitch"	-	-	-	-	-	-	-	More Than Meets the Eye

=== Non-album appearances ===
Other songs by or with EliZe:

Year	Song	Alternate artist	Album
2005	"We've Got Tonight"	Jim & EliZe	Dance With Me
2006	"No Good to Me"		Itsy Bitsy Spider (Single)
2007	"Voor Mij"	The Opposites	Begin Twintig
2010	"No Time to Waste"	Seymour Bits feat. EliZe	Seymour Bits
2010	"Loving Hands"	Seymour Bits feat. Wiwalean & EliZe	Seymour Bits
2012	"Beautiful Day"		Superpop (Party Hard) (Compilation)
2012	"Missing Me Now"		Superpop (Girls Rule) (Compilation)
2012	"Rise to the Top"		Superpop (Girls Rule) (Compilation)
2013	"I Just Wanna Have Fun"		Superpop (Girls Rule 2) (Compilation)
