= Itsy Bitsy Spider (EliZe song) =

Single by EliZe featuring Jay Colin

from the album In Control
- B-side: "No Good to Me"
- Released: (Netherlands) October 27, 2006
- Recorded: June 24, 2006
- Genre: Pop
- Length: 3:12
- Label: CMM
- Songwriter(s): RedOne; Novel Jannusi; A. Bergstrom; Johan W
- Producer(s): RedOne; Novel Jannusi

EliZe featuring Jay Colin singles chronology
"Into Your System" (2006)	"Itsy Bitsy Spider" (2006)	"Lovesick" (2008)

"Itsy Bitsy Spider" is a pop song recorded by the Dutch singer EliZe. It features rapper Jay Colin. The song was released as the fifth single from EliZe's 2006 debut album In Control.

== Track listing ==
CD single

1. "Itsy Bitsy Spider" (featuring Jay Colin) – 3:13
2. "Itsy Bitsy Spider" [album version] – 3:12
3. "No Good to Me" – 3:35 ^{1}

^{1} "No Good to Me" was written by EliZe, Peter Hartmann, Jan Langhoff and Linda Holmberg.

== Charts ==
Chart (2006)	Peak position
Dutch Single Top 100	54
Dutch Top 40	tip5
