= Icebreaker International =

Icebreaker International is an Electronic band formed by musicians Alexander Perls and Simon Break. They have released three albums.

== History ==
New Yorker Alexander Perls and Londoner Simon Break met each other while Perls was attending school in London, eventually joining up with Glen Johnson in the musical collective, Piano Magic. After leaving the Piano Magic stable, Perls and Break formed the highly conceptual electro-acoustic duo Icebreaker. With funding provided by NATOarts, Distant Early Warning was released in September 1999 through Aesthetics. Like the Rush song of the same name, the record took its name from, and was inspired by, the radar stations located at the edges of Canada and Alaska that warned NATO member states of possible Soviet nuclear strikes.

Continuing their alliance with NATOarts — an organization that "seeks to promote global security and stability through the exhibition of works of conceptual art" — the duo claimed to have boarded a container ship named Trein Maersk in early 2000, spending two months on the ship during its journey from Japan to Canada recording an audio document promoting free international trade. With the help of portable digital audio equipment, Break and Perls were able to make their report possible. Released just over half a year after their return to terra firma, Trein Maersk: A Report to the NATOarts Board of Directors made their extensive report public.

== Discography ==
=== Albums ===
- Distant Early Warning (1999)
- Trein Maersk: A Report to the NATOarts Board of Directors (2000)
- Into Forever (2003) (collaboration with Manual)

=== Singles ===
- "Icebreaker*" / "Piano Magic - #1" (1998)
- "Port Of Yokohama" (2000)
