= Vi Ejer Natten =

Single by Clemens, Hedegaard & Jon Nørgaard
- Released: 27 December 2011
- Recorded: 2011
- Genre: Dance
- Length: 3:33
- Label: U&!

Clemens singles chronology
"Fuck hvor er det fedt (at være hip hop'er)" (2011)	"Vi Ejer Natten" (2011)

Jon Nørgaard singles chronology
"Fester Kun Med Mig Selv" (2011)	"Champion" (2011)	"Mød Mig I Mørket" (2012)

"Vi Ejer Natten" is a single by Danish rapper, singer, music writer, actor Clemens, Hedegaard and Jon Nørgaard. It was released in Denmark as a digital download on 27 December 2011. The song has so far peaked to number 14 on the Danish Singles Chart.

== Track listing ==
Digital download

1. "Vi Ejer Natten" - 3:33

== Chart performance ==
Chart (2012)	Peak position
Denmark (Tracklisten)	14

== Release history ==
Region	Date	Format	Label
Denmark	27 December 2011	Digital Download	U&!
