= This Way Up =

This Way Up may refer to:

== Film and television ==
- Brian Conley: This Way Up, a 1989-1990 UK sketch comedy TV show
- This Way Up (film), a 2008 short film
- This Way Up (TV series), a British comedy-drama TV series

== Music ==
- This Way Up (album), an album by Chris de Burgh
- This Way Up (band), a band formed by Culture Club member Roy Hay in 1987
- This Way Up Tour, a 1987 concert tour by Peter Gabriel

== See also ==
- This Way Upp, a 1976 album by Upp
- This Way Up, a 2025 book by the creators of Map Men, Jay Foreman and Mark Cooper-Jones.
- This Side Up (disambiguation)
