= Circ (duo) =

American music duo

Circ was an American music duo consisting of Alexander Perls and Madelin Zero, releasing only one album, Love Electric, in 2004. They are best known for their single "Destroy She Said", which spent seven weeks in the German Media Control charts, peaking at No. 53. The duo disbanded in 2005.

== Discography ==
=== Album ===
- Love Electric (2004)

=== Singles ===
- "Destroy She Said" (2002)
- "Close Your Eyes" (2003)
- "Love Electric" (2004)
