= Ahmad Darwich =

Ahmad Darwich (Darwich)
- Also known as: Darwich, N'Joy
- Born: Ahmad Darwich; Lebanon
- Origin: Lebanese-Danish
- Genres: Dance music, house
- Occupations: DJ, Producer, Songwriter
- Years active: 1999–present
- Label: Kashcow (founder)

Ahmad Darwich (in Arabic أحمد درويش) (born in Lebanon on 15 May 1977) also known as Darwich, is a Lebanese-Danish DJ, songwriter and record producer. He is co-founder of the Danish Kashcow record label.

== Darwich & Garcia ==
Darwich closely collaborated with Thomas Høgsted between 1999 and 2004 as a dance music producing duo Darwich & Garcia producing various successful acts like Danish girl duo Creamy (whose debut album was certified four times platinum), Catch, Das Saint, Mardia, Mirah, Smile.dk, Tiggy, B Sides, JJ Spencer, Ivy D., Covergirl, Ice, Sisse, and Razz, the 2002 winner of Junior Melodi Grand Prix with the song "Kickflipper".

Under the name B-Sides, a trio collaboration with Thomas Høgsted and Lasse Thomsen, he released the single "Respect Your DJ"

== Pad ==
During the same period, he was part of Pad (Panman, Ace45 and Darwich) with Ace 45 being Morten Erikson and Panman being Jeppe Budolfsen. In 2001 Pad produced Mardia's "Knock Knock Knocking".

== Other production and songwriting works ==
In 2008 he collaborated with DJ Kato in "Copa Cabana (Whine Your Body)" featuring Mission. He went on to produce and co-write Kato's Discolized that reached number 6 in Tracklisten the Danish Albums Chart and follow-up Discolized 2.0 that topped the chart. Darwich and Kato also cooperated with Jeremy Carr.

Under the alias N'Joy, he has appeared in a number of compilation albums like Giga Hits Summer Lato 2002, Giga Hits Zima 2003, Millenium Disco 2010 and as N'Joy was featured in Aycan track "Devil in Disguise" in the compilation album DJ Sampler Denmark from TMC - The Music Company.

"I'm No Latino" a hit for Dutch pop and dance singer EliZe.

== Kashcow ==
Co-founding Kashcow, he signed many artists to the label including Chrelle, Chriz, JesperZar, Kelde, Ridser I Lakken, Jack Rowan, Michael Rune and groups Daze, Aycan. The label has also released works for Nadia Gattas, Cecilie Fleur and Tønnov.

has released a number of singles featuring artists like Kato, Linda Andrews, Inez, Anna David, Nile and Lyck. He has also written and produced songs for Michael Rune, and groups Daze amongst others.

== Awards and nominations ==
- In 2011, he was nominated for Best Danish DJ and nine other categories during the Danish DeeJay Awards.

== Discography ==
Charting

Year	Single	Peak positions	Album
Year	Single	DEN	Album
2012	"Go! (Ba Ba Ba)" (feat. Niel)	25	

=== Other releases ===
Darwich

- 2010: Kato - Discolized (album production)
- 2011: Kato - Discolized 2.0 (album production)

Darwich & Garcia

(production and songwriting duo Ahmad Darwich and Thomas Høgsted)

- 1999: Creamy Den Bedste Jul I 2000 År (EP single)
- 1999: Creamy - Creamy
- 2000: Creamy - "Little Kitty" (single)
- 2000: Smile.dk – Future Girls (album)
- 2002: Razz - "Kickflipper" (single)
- 2002: Razz - Kickflipper (album)
- 2003: Ivy D. – "Stop That Time" (single)
- 2003: Covergirl - "Believe" (single)
- 2004: JJ Spencer – "Better Safe Than Sorry" (single)
- 2004: Ice – "Singin' Dam Di Da Doo" (single)

B-Sides

(production trio Ahmad Darwich, Thomas Høgsted and Lasse Thomsen)

- 2001: "Respect Your DJ"

Kashcow

- as Darwich (DJ)
  - 2008: Kato & Darwich feat. Mission - "Copa Cabana (Whine Your Body)"
  - 2010: Darwich feat. Linda Andrews - "Det bedste til sidst"
  - 2011: Darwich feat. Inez - "Puls"
  - 2012: Darwich feat. Anna David - "Solstorm"
  - 2013: Darwich feat. Niel - "Go! (Ba Ba Ba)"
  - 2013: Darwich feat Lyck - "Tusind År"
- Others
  - 2011: Aycan - "Easy Come Easy Go"
  - 2011: Michael Rune feat. Nadia Gattas - "Min indre stemme"
  - 2012: Michael Rune feat. Cecilie Fleur - "Væk i natten"
  - 2012: Daze - "Fool Me!"
  - 2012: Kelde - "One More Night"
  - 2013: Jack Rowan feat Sam Gray - "Invincible"
  - 2013: Kelde feat. Mona Lisa - "Get on the Floor"
  - 2013: Tönnov - "We Are Always Looking Hot"
  - 2013: Tönnov - "Turn It Up!"
  - 2013: No Requests - "I'm a DJ Not a Jukebox"

featured in as N'Joy

- 2010: "Devil in Disguise" (Aycan featuring N'Joy)
