= Discolized =

2010 studio album by Kato

Studio album by Kato
- Released: 1 March 2010
- Recorded: 2009–2010
- Genre: House; dance-pop
- Label: Disco:wax; Sony
- Producer: Kato; Darwich

Singles from Discolized
- 1. "Turn the Lights Off" Released: 1 January 2010; 2. "Hey Shorty (Yeah Yeah Pt. II)" Released: 26 April 2010; 3. "Desert Walk" Released: 13 September 2010

Discolized is the debut album from the Danish house DJ and producer Kato in collaboration with a number of DJs and vocal artists. The album was co-produced by Kato and Ahmad Darwich. Discolized was released on 1 March 2010 reaching No. 6 on the Danish Albums Chart. The album was reissued on 4 April 2011 under the title Discolized 2.0 that includes new versions, remixes and singles "Sjus" and "Speakers On" on two CDs.

== Track listings ==
=== Discolized (2010) ===
1. "My House (2010)" (4:19)
2. "Turn the Lights Off" (featuring Jon) (2:57)
3. "Desert Walk" (featuring Outlandish) (3:31)
4. "Makka" (5:07)
5. "Discolized" (Kato and Terri B.) (3:21)
6. "Alive" (5:50)
7. "It's My Life" (featuring Dr. Alban, Tony T and Carl Pritt) (3:21)
8. "Opa" (4:23)
9. "Remember My Name" (featuring Jon) (3:37)
10. "Crowd Control" (6:10)
11. "Runnin' Away" (featuring Estella) (4:09)
12. "P.Y.H.I.T.A.R.N" (3:59)
13. "Crossed the Line" (featuring Morten Luco) (3:41)
14. "Hey Shorty (Yeah Yeah Pt. II)" (featuring U$O and Johnson) (3:15)
15. "Lullaby" (3:45)

Discolized 2.0

Studio album by Kato
- Released: 4 April 2011
- Recorded: 2009–2011
- Genre: House; dance-pop
- Label: Disco:wax; Sony
- Producer: Kato; Darwich

Singles from Discolized 2.0
- 1. "Sjus" Released: 27 December 2010; 2. "Speakers On" Released: 18 March 2011; 3. "Celebrate Life" Released: 15 April 2011

=== Discolized 2.0 (2011) ===
CD1

1. "Discolized 2.0" (Kato and Terri B)
2. "Sjus" (featuring Ida Corr, Camille Jones and Johnson) (Kato edit)
3. "Speakers On" (Kato and Infernal)
4. "Fuck hvor er det fedt (at være hip hop'er)" (featuring Clemens)
5. "Turn the Lights Off" (featuring Jon)
6. "Celebrate Life" (featuring Jeremy Carr)
7. "Desert Walk" (featuring Outlandish)
8. "Hey Shorty (Yeah Yeah Pt. II)" (featuring U$O and Johnson)
9. "Remember My Name 2.0" (featuring Jon)
10. "Happiness" (featuring Jeremy Carr)
11. "My House 2.0" (featuring Brandon Beal and Negash Ali)
12. "Champion Part II" (Clemens and Jon)

CD2

1. "Helele" (Velile and Safri Duo) (Kato remix)
2. "Desert Walk" (featuring Outlandish) (Kato remix)
3. "Kato på maskinerne" (Hej Matematik) (extended)
4. "Velkommen til Medina" (Medina) (Kato remix)
5. "Turn the Lights Off" (featuring Jon) (Dave Darell remix)
6. "Har det hele" (Rune RK featuring Karen and Jooks) (Kato remix)
7. "You & Me" (Electric Lady Lab) (Kato remix)
8. "Are You Gonna Go My Way" (featuring Ian Dawn) (Jack Rowan Midnight Bomb mix)
9. "Burn It" (Carpark North) (Kato remix)
10. "Sjus" (featuring Ida Corr, Camille Jones and Johnson) (Hedegaard remix)
11. "Seek Bromance" (Tim Berg) (Kato remix)
12. "Hey Shorty (Yeah Yeah Pt. II)" (featuring U$O and Johnson) (Jack Rowan remix)
13. "I nat" (Svenstrup & Vendelboe featuring Karen) (Kato remix)

== Charts ==
=== Weekly charts ===
Weekly chart performance
Chart (2010–2011)	Peak position
Danish Albums (Hitlisten) Discolized	6
Danish Albums (Hitlisten) Discolized 2.0	1

=== Year-end charts ===
Year-end chart performance
Chart (2011)	Position
Danish Albums (Hitlisten) Discolized 2.0	24

== Certifications ==
Certifications
Region	Certification	Certified units/sales
Denmark (IFPI Danmark) Discolized	Platinum	20,000^{‡}
Denmark (IFPI Danmark) Discolized 2.0	Platinum	20,000^{‡}
^{‡} Sales+streaming figures based on certification alone.
