= Into Your System =

Single by EliZe

from the album In Control
- Released: (Netherlands) June 2, 2006
- Recorded: 2006
- Genre: Dance-pop
- Length: 3:05
- Label: CMM
- Songwriter(s): Peter Hartmann; Jan Langhoff
- Producer(s): Peter Hartmann; Jan Langhoff

EliZe singles chronology
"I'm No Latino" (2005)	"Into Your System" (2006)	"Itsy Bitsy Spider" (2006)

"Into Your System" is a song written and produced by Peter Hartmann and Jan Langhoff and recorded by the Dutch singer EliZe. The song was the fourth single released from EliZe's first album, In Control (2006). The single entered the Dutch Top 40 at number 33 and peaked at number 18 in its fourth week.

== Track listing ==
CD single

1. "Into Your System" [radio version] – 3:05
2. "Into Your System" [extended version] – 6:14
3. "Into Your System" [enhanced video] – 3:05

== Music video ==
The music video of "Into Your System" is directed by Peter van Eyndt and features EliZe in several settings, amongst which a scene with diamonds all over her body and a scene with a yellow python.

== Charts ==
Chart (2006)	Peak position
Dutch Top 40	18
Dutch Single Top 100	15
