= Automatic (I'm Talking to You) =

Single by EliZe

from the album In Control
- Released: (Netherlands) March 7, 2005
- Recorded: 2005; H&L Studio Copenhagen, DK
- Genre: Pop, dance
- Length: 3:12
- Label: Spinnin' Records
- Songwriters: Torsten Stenzel; Adrian Zagoritis
- Producers: Peter Hartmann; Jan Langhoff

EliZe singles chronology
"Shake" (2004)	"Automatic (I'm Talking to You)" (2005)	"I'm No Latino" (2005)

"Automatic (I'm Talking to You)" is a dance/pop song written by Torsten Stenzel & Adrian Zagoritis and recorded by the Dutch singer EliZe. She recorded the song in early 2005 and released it on March 7, 2005 as the second single from her debut album In Control, which was released in October 2006. The song was produced, mixed and arranged by Peter Hartmann and Jan Langhoff at the H&L Studio Copenhagen for TG Production Denmark. It was EliZe's second single to be given the title "Dancesmash" by Radio 538. It reached the top ten and peaked at number 7 in the Dutch Top 40. The song also charted in Bulgaria, Finland, Belgium, Germany and France.

== Review ==
Review by Dirrrty Pop:

This is quite possibly the best pop single of the year so far. If it's not the biggest dance hit of the year I shall be not only shocked but horrified - it deserves nothing less. If "Call on Me" can get to number 1 for 7 weeks or however ridicuously long it was, then this should be number 1 for at least a year. It's a good video in that Elize looks good and it fits the song, but I would have preferred it to be more of a girls going out having fun video than this almost desperately sexy one. This should be a song for girls (and boys) to dance their socks off to, not just for pervy men to ogle. It's just too good to fall to that level.

== Track listings and formats ==
CD single

1. "Automatic" [radio edit] – 3:12
2. "Automatic" [extended edit] – 5:49
3. "Automatic" [remix] – 3:49
4. "Automatic" [Kaner remix] – 6:57
5. "Automatic" [karaoke version] – 3:15
6. "Automatic" [enhanced video] – 3:11

Digital download

1. "Automatic" [radio edit] – 3:14

== Charts ==
=== Weekly charts ===
Chart (2005)	Peak position
Belgium (Ultratop 50 Flanders)	18
Finland (Suomen virallinen lista)	11
France (SNEP)	67
Germany (GfK)	63
Netherlands (Dutch Top 40)	7
Netherlands (Single Top 100)	8

=== Year-end charts ===
Chart (2005)	Position
Belgium (Ultratop Flanders)	92
Netherlands (Dutch Top 40)	35
Netherlands (Single Top 100)	48

== Personnel ==
=== Production ===
- Track 3 remix & additional production by Mike van der Ark and Remco Sablerolle for Attic Productions.
- Track 4 remix & additional production by Kaner for Maratone Music, Hamburg.
- Additional keyboards by Weiland/Sikorski.
- Mastering by Arjan Rietvink.
- Published by Casablanca/EMI Music Publ/Pigfactory Music Publishing/MusicAllStars/MundoMusic.

=== Single Photography ===
- Photos by Ray Christian.
- Styling by Moon V. (Kim Siderius, Samantha Richardson, Wings Byoux, Gimmicks Amsterdam, Next Issue (Uomo) Amstelveen).
- Hairstyling & make-up by Jedidjah Kuijten.
- Coverdesign by Marc Schilkowski.

=== Music video ===
- Video Director: Jonathan Weyland
- Choreography: Eleanor Lejarde
