= Champion (Clemens song) =

Single by Clemens featuring Jon Nørgaard
- Released: 10 October 2010
- Recorded: 2010
- Genre: Hip-Hop/Rap
- Length: 4:38
- Label: Universal Music
- Songwriters: Bjoern Mats Johan Djupstroem, Thomas Holm Hinz, Jon Nørgaard, Clenes Legolas Telling, Thomas Kato Vittrup

Clemens singles chronology
"La' dem hænge" (2007)	"Champion" (2010)	"Byen Sover" (2011)

Jon Nørgaard singles chronology
"Turn the Lights Off" (2010)	"Champion" (2010)	"Dine Øjne" (2011)

"Champion" is a single by Danish rapper, singer, music writer, actor Clemens. It was released in Denmark as a digital download on 10 October 2010. The song peaked at number 1 on the Danish Singles Chart. The song features vocals from Danish singer Jon Nørgaard.

== Track listing ==
Digital download

1. "Champion" (feat. Jon Nørgaard) - 4:38
2. "Champion" (feat. Jon Nørgaard) [Radio Edit] - 4:05

== Chart performance ==
Chart (2010)	Peak position
Denmark (Tracklisten)	1

== Certifications ==
Region	Certification	Certified units/sales
Denmark (IFPI Danmark)	Platinum	90,000^{‡}
Streaming
Denmark (IFPI Danmark)	Gold	50,000^{†}
^{‡} Sales+streaming figures based on certification alone.^{†} Streaming-only figures based on certification alone.

== Release history ==
Region	Date	Format	Label
Denmark	10 October 2010	Digital Download	Universal Music
