= Shake (EliZe song) =

Single by EliZe

from the album In Control
- Released: (Netherlands) October 18, 2004
- Recorded: 2004; H&L Studio, Copenhagen, DK
- Genre: Europop
- Length: 3:15
- Label: Spinnin' Records
- Songwriter(s): Peter Hartmann; Jan Langhoff; Linda Holmberg
- Producer(s): Peter Hartmann; Jan Langhoff

EliZe singles chronology
"Shake" (2004)	"Automatic (I'm Talking to You)" (2005)

"Shake" is a Europop song written by the Peter Hartmann, Jan Langhoff and Linda Holmberg and recorded by the Dutch singer EliZe. The song was released as EliZe's first single from her debut album In Control, which was released in October 2006 in the Benelux. It was produced by Peter Hartmann and Jan Langhoff and was made "Dancesmash" by Radio 538. The single spent 5 weeks in the Dutch Top 40 and peaked at number 32.

== Music video ==
Directed by Robert Brouwers, the music video for "Shake" was released prior to the single's commercial release. Shot in a discotheek in her home country The Netherlands, EliZe appears dancing with her background dancers, performing a sensual choreography. EliZe is sexy in the style of Britney Spears, while she keeps on dancing and singing throughout the video.

== Review ==
Review by Artistopia Music:

If you're familiar with the song "Put the Needle on It" by Dannii Minogue, you are going to be shocked by the ripped off rhythm, bass, melody, vocal quality, and even lyrical concept of this song! It's unbelievable. But it's a good funky dance tune, and the remix is a heavy and melodic trance track that doesn't focus so much on the vocal. You get an edit and extended version of the original mix, and edit and extended version of the trance mix, and an instrumental karaoke mix.

== Formats and track listings ==
"Shake" was released on October 18, 2004 in the Netherlands. On May 17, 2005, the CD single was released in the U.S. with the vinyl single appearing on May 23, 2005.

Dutch CD single

1. "Shake" [radio edit] – 3:15
2. "Shake" [extended edit] – 6:31
3. "Shake" [remix] – 3:55
4. "Shake" [club mix] – 7:43
5. "Shake" [karaoke version] - 3:30
6. "Shake" [enhanced video] – 3:13

US CD single

1. "Shake" [radio edit] – 3:14
2. "Shake" [remix] – 3:52
3. "Shake" [extended edit] – 6:29
4. "Shake" [club mix] – 7:42
5. "Shake" [karaoke version] – 3:28

US (promo) vinyl single

Side 1

1. "Shake" [extended edit] – 6:29
2. "Shake" [radio edit] – 3:14

Side 2

1. "Shake" [club mix] – 7:42
2. "Shake" [remix] – 3:52

== Charts ==
Chart (2004)	Peak position
Dutch Top 40	32

== Personnel ==
- Track 3 & 4 (CD single) produced by Matina Productions.
- Published by: T.G. Publishing/Mundo Music/Music Allstars.
- Styling: Moon V., Paul Warmer, Tov Jewels, It Store (Laren), The Factory, Kiki Riki, Next Issue (Amstelveen), Hip (Amsterdam) & DS Fashion
- Hairstyling & make-up: Jedidjah Kuijten.
- Photos: Priscilla Laurens.
- Video director: Robert Brouwers.
- Video location: PV Showservice.
- Choreography: Angelique Versnel (who is best known for her role in Alice Deejay).
- Mastering by: AR Digital Mastering.
- Distributed in the Netherlands by BMG.
