= I'm No Latino =

Single by EliZe

from the album In Control
- Released: (Netherlands) August 22, 2005
- Recorded: 2005
- Genre: Pop, Latin pop
- Length: 3:06
- Label: Spinnin' Records
- Songwriters: Ahmad Darwich; Dorthe Hansen
- Producer: Ahmad Darwich

EliZe singles chronology
"Automatic (I'm Talking to You)" (2005)	"I'm No Latino" (2005)	"Into Your System" (2006)

"I'm No Latino" is a dance-pop song written by Ahmad Darwich and Dorthe Hansen and produced by Darwich at the Panic Studio in Aalborg for TG Production Denmark. Recorded by the Dutch singer EliZe in 2005, she released the song as the third single from her 2006 debut album In Control. Released on August 22, 2005 in the Netherlands, this single reached the number 14 position, spending 6 weeks in the Dutch Top 40 chart. The music video, directed by Jonathan Weyland, became the 'TMF SuperClip' for the week after its introduction.

== Review ==
A review in Artistopia.com says:

I was pleasantly surprised when I listened to EliZe's "I'm No Latino." This is her first track where she branches away from the club/trance she was doing, and moves into a more Latin influenced pop genre. This song could easily be sung by Jennifer Lopez, and has great lyrics, a killer chorus, and an awesome video!

== Track listings and formats ==
CD single

1. "I'm No Latino" [radio edit] – 3:05
2. "I'm No Latino" [extended edit] – 3:58
3. "I'm No Latino" [karaoke version] – 3:03
4. "I'm No Latino" [enhanced video] – 03:02

Digital download

1. "I'm No Latino" [radio edit] – 3:05
2. "I'm No Latino" [extended edit] – 3:58
3. "I'm No Latino" [karaoke version] – 3:03

== Charts ==
Chart (2005)	Peak position
Dutch Top 40	14
Dutch Single Top 100	11
Belgian Ultratop 50	39

== Personnel ==
=== Production ===
- Vocal production by Hartmann & Langhoff for TG Production Denmark.
- Lyrics co-ordination by Chris Willemsen.
- Mastering by AR Digital Mastering.
- Published by T.G. Publishing/MundoMusic/MusicAllStars.

=== Single Photography ===
- Photography: William Rutten
- Styling: Moon V. (New Impulse Fashion, Rosa Cha, Mippies, Icoon Amstelveen, Colours of Asia, Ottitude)
- Hairstyling & Make-up: Jedidjah Kuijten
- Design: René van der Weijde - TFX

=== Music video ===
- Directed by Jonathan Weyland.
