= Independent Music Group =

- Company type: Private
- Industry: Music publishing
- Founded: 1989
- Headquarters: 3 York House, Langston Road, Loughton, Essex, IG10 3TQ
- Area served: UK and worldwide
- Key people: Ellis Rich (Chief Executive); Andy Bailey (Director of A&R)
- Products: Music publishing
- Website: IMG

The Independent Music Group or IMG is one of the UK's larger independent publishers.

== History ==
It was founded in 1989 by Ellis Rich, who had worked in the international division of EMI Music Publishing (managing EMI's UK catalogue overseas and international catalogues in the UK from 1975 to 81). It acquired publishing catalogues and small publishers. The company deals with smaller publishers and artists to get their work to a larger international network and market.

The internet has since helped smaller music publishers to affordably reach a global market, at the same time as helping many people to illegally share (distribute) copyrighted music, to the chagrin of the mainstream music industry.

== Structure ==
Ellis Rich, the Chief Executive, was Chairman of PRS He was also a director of the Music Publishers Association and the Mechanical-Copyright Protection Society (MCPS). He had formed E&S Music with Simon Cowell in the 1980s - Cowell's first commercial venture.
