= Dine Øjne =

Single by Jon Nørgaard

from the album Uden dig
- Released: 7 March 2011
- Recorded: 2010–11
- Genre: Pop/Electronic
- Length: 4:27
- Label: Universal Music
- Songwriter(s): Michael Kastrup Jensen, Jon Nørgaard

Jon Nørgaard singles chronology
| "Clemens" (2010) | "Dine Øjne" (2011) | "Fester Kun Med Mig Selv" (2011) |

"Dine Øjne" is a single by Danish singer Jon Nørgaard, from his third studio album Uden dig. It was released in Denmark as a digital download on 7 March 2011. The song peaked at number 14 on the Danish Singles Chart.

== Track listing ==
Digital download

1. "Dine Øjne" - 5:23
2. "Dine Øjne" (Radio Edit) - 4:27

== Chart performance ==
| Chart (2011) | Peak position |
|---|---|
| Denmark (Tracklisten) | 14 |

== Release history ==
| Region | Date | Format | Label |
|---|---|---|---|
| Denmark | 7 March 2011 | Digital Download | Universal Music |
