= Popstar (Jon Nørgaard song) =

Single by Jon Nørgaard
- Released: 26 August 2005
- Recorded: 2005
- Genre: Hip-Hop/Rap
- Length: 3:26
- Label: Transistor Music
- Songwriter(s): Johan Ekhé, Ulf Lindström, Remee, Robyn
- Producer(s): Oli Poulsen

Jon Nørgaard singles chronology
"Love Changes (Everything)" (2004)	"Popstar" (2005)	"Hurry Up Live" (2006)

"Popstar" is a single by Danish singer Jon Nørgaard, from his second studio album Today Is a Good Day (To Fall in Love). It was released in Denmark as a digital download on 26 August 2005. The song peaked at number 8 on the Danish Singles Chart.

== Track listing ==
Digital download

1. "Popstar" - 3:26

== Chart performance ==
Chart (2005)	Peak position
Denmark (Tracklisten)	8

== Release history ==
Region	Date	Format	Label
Denmark	26 August 2005	Digital Download	Transistor Music
