= Fester Kun Med Mig Selv =

Single by Jon Nørgaard

from the album Uden dig
- Released: 27 June 2011
- Recorded: 2011
- Genre: Pop/Electronic
- Length: 3:37
- Label: Universal Music
- Songwriter(s): Jeppe Federspeil, Jon Nørgaard, Rasmus Stabell

Jon Nørgaard singles chronology
| "Dine Øjne" (2011) | "Fester Kun Med Mig Selv" (2011) | "Vi Ejer Natten" (2011) |

"Fester Kun Med Mig Selv" is a single by Danish singer Jon Nørgaard, from his third studio album Uden dig. It was released in Denmark as a digital download on 27 June 2011. The song peaked at number 39 on the Danish Singles Chart.

== Track listing ==
Digital download

1. "Fester Kun Med Mig Selv" - 3:37

== Chart performance ==
| Chart (2011) | Peak position |
|---|---|
| Denmark (Tracklisten) | 39 |

== Release history ==
| Region | Date | Format | Label |
|---|---|---|---|
| Denmark | 27 June 2011 | Digital Download | Universal Music |
