= Turn the Lights Off =

2007 single by DJ Jose

Single by DJ Jose
- Released: 9 March 2007
- Genre: House
- Length: 2:59
- Label: Zzap
- Songwriters: L.T.R. van Schooneveld; Jos Klaster; Alexander Perls

DJ Jose singles chronology
"Dedication" (2006)	"Turn the Lights Off" (2007)	"Physical Attraction" (2007)

"Turn the Lights Off" is a single by Dutch disc jockey and music producer DJ Jose. It was released as a digital download on 9 March 2007. The song was written by L.T.R. van Schooneveld, Jos Klaster, and Alexander Perls, and vocals were performed by Jeremy Carr.

"Turn the Lights Off" was covered by Danish disc jockey Kato in 2010. Kato's version found viral success in 2025 after being featured in a meme with actor Jon Hamm in a club dancing scene from the American television series Your Friends & Neighbors.

In 2026, Kato revealed to Headliner magazine that the viral success initially started from social media accounts in Ukraine, before the Jon Hamm meme took over. He also reacted to the unexpected success of his 2010 track: "Whenever I was on TikTok or Instagram, every time I swiped to the next video, it was my song again and again."

== Track listing ==
CD single

1. "Turn the Lights Off" (single) – 3:00
2. "Turn the Lights Off" (DJ Milo.nl vs CJ Stone rmx) – 7:11

Digital download

1. "Turn the Lights Off" (single mix) – 2:59
2. "Turn the Lights Off" (Original Mix) – 4:59
3. "Turn the Lights Off" (DJ Milo.nl vs CJ Stone remix) – 7:12
4. "Turn the Lights Off" (2 Nefuse remix) – 5:29
5. "Turn the Lights Off" (Sebastian Davidson & Licious K remix) – 6:09
6. "Turn the Lights Off" (Veron & Praia Del Sol remix) – 6:26

== Charts ==
Chart (2007)	Peak position
Netherlands (Single Top 100)	17

== Kato version ==
"Turn the Lights Off"

Single by Kato featuring Jon

from the album Discolized
- Released: 1 January 2010
- Recorded: 2009
- Genre: EDM
- Length: 2:58
- Label: disco:wax
- Songwriters: L.T.R. van Schooneveld; Jos Klaster; Alexander Perls
- Producers: Kato; Darwich

Kato singles chronology
"Yeah Yeah" (2008)	"Turn the Lights Off" (2010)	"Hey Shorty (Yeah Yeah Pt. 2)" (2010)

Jon singles chronology
"Honestly" (2009)	"Turn the Lights Off" (2010)	"Champion" (2010)

"Turn the Lights Off" is a single by Danish disc jockey and music producer Kato, from his debut album Discolized. The song features vocals from Danish singer Jon Nørgaard. It was released in Denmark as a digital download on 1 January 2010. The song peaked at number 4 on the Danish Singles Chart.

=== Track listing ===
Digital download

1. "Turn the Lights Off" (radio edit) – 2:58
2. "Turn the Lights Off" (extended version) – 5:02

=== Charts ===
==== Weekly charts ====
Weekly chart performance
Chart (2010)	Peak position
CIS Airplay (TopHit)	5
Denmark (Tracklisten)	4
Russia Airplay (TopHit)	5
Sweden (Sverigetopplistan)	6
Ukraine Airplay (TopHit)	22

Weekly chart performance
Chart (2011)	Peak position
CIS Airplay (TopHit)	62
Russia Airplay (TopHit)	57
Ukraine Airplay (TopHit)	25

Weekly chart performance
Chart (2012)	Peak position
CIS Airplay (TopHit)	45
Russia Airplay (TopHit)	37

Weekly chart performance
Chart (2025–2026)	Peak position
Australia Airplay (RCS Media Monitors)	1
Austria (Ö3 Austria Top 40)	32
Belarus Airplay (TopHit)	106
Bulgaria Airplay (PROPHON)	1
Canada (Canadian Hot 100)	33
CIS Airplay (TopHit)	79
Croatia International Airplay (Top lista)	32
Czech Republic Airplay (ČNS IFPI)	5
Denmark (Tracklisten)	9
Finland (Suomen virallinen lista)	23
Finland Airplay (Radiosoittolista)	8
France (SNEP)	167
Germany (GfK)	24
Germany Airplay (BVMI)	16
Germany Dance (GfK)	2
Global 200 (Billboard)	60
Greece International (IFPI)	41
Greece International Airplay (IFPI)	9
Hungary (Dance Top 40)	15
Hungary (Rádiós Top 40)	12
Ireland (IRMA)	40
Israel International Airplay (Media Forest)	7
Italy (FIMI)	74
Latvia Airplay (LaIPA)	7
Lithuania (AGATA)	45
Moldova Airplay (TopHit)	3
Netherlands (Single Tip)	6
North Macedonia Airplay (Radiomonitor)	3
Norway (VG-lista)	19
Poland Streaming (OLiS)	21
Portugal (AFP)	147
Romania Airplay (UPFR)	1
Romania Airplay (Media Forest)	2
Romania TV Airplay (Media Forest)	13
Russia Streaming (TopHit)	65
Slovakia Airplay (ČNS IFPI)	22
Sweden (Sverigetopplistan)	30
Switzerland (Schweizer Hitparade)	28
UK Singles (Official Charts)	33
UK Dance (Official Charts)	3
UK Indie (Official Charts)	23
US Billboard Hot 100	82
US Hot Dance/Electronic Songs (Billboard)	3

==== Monthly charts ====
2010 monthly chart performance
Chart (2010)	Peak position
CIS Airplay (TopHit)	7
Russia Airplay (TopHit)	6
Ukraine Airplay (TopHit)	23

2011 monthly chart performance
Chart (2011)	Peak position
CIS Airplay (TopHit)	95
Ukraine Airplay (TopHit)	24

2026 monthly chart performance
Chart (2026)	Peak position
Moldova Airplay (TopHit)	3
Romania Airplay (TopHit)	2

==== Year-end charts ====
Year-end chart performance
Chart (2010)	Position
CIS Airplay (TopHit)	11
Denmark (Tracklisten)	12
Sweden (Sverigetopplistan)	73
Russia Airplay (TopHit)	9
Ukraine Airplay (TopHit)	93

Year-end chart performance
Chart (2011)	Position
CIS Airplay (TopHit)	150
Russia Airplay (TopHit)	149

=== Certifications ===
Region	Certification	Certified units/sales
Denmark (IFPI Danmark)	2× Platinum	180,000^{‡}
Hungary (MAHASZ)	Platinum	3,000^{‡}
Norway (IFPI Norway)	Gold	30,000^{‡}
Sweden (GLF)	2× Platinum	80,000^{‡}
United Kingdom (BPI)	Silver	200,000^{‡}
^{‡} Sales+streaming figures based on certification alone.

=== Release history ===
Region	Date	Format	Label
Denmark	1 January 2010	Digital download	disco:wax

== Justė version ==
"Turn the Lights Off"

Single by Justė, Jaxstyle, Jon
- Released: 7 November 2025
- Genre: Speed garage
- Length: 2:42
- Label: Spinnin'
- Songwriters: L.T.R. van Schooneveld; Jos Klaster; Alexander Perls
- Producers: Jaxstyle; Jon; Justė; Mischa Lugthart; Peter Bjørnskov; Timmo Hendriks

Justė singles chronology
"World of Wonders" (2025)	"Turn the Lights Off" (2025)	"Just a Little" (2026)

Jaxstyle singles chronology
"Adam" (2024)	"Turn the Lights Off" (2025)	"What Are We Gonna Do" (2026)

Jon singles chronology
"Postcard" (2020)	"Turn the Lights Off" (2025)	"What Are We Gonna Do" (2026)

In 2025, the song was covered by Lithuanian DJ Justė and Danish Twitch streamer and DJ Jaxstyle. The song contains re-recorded vocals by Danish singer Jon, who also featured on the 2010 cover version by Kato. It was released as a digital download on 7 November 2025 through Spinnin' Records.

=== Charts ===
==== Weekly charts ====
Weekly chart performance
Chart (2025–2026)	Peak position
Belgium (Ultratop 50 Flanders)	15
CIS Airplay (TopHit)	31
Czech Republic Airplay (ČNS IFPI)	3
Estonia Airplay (TopHit)	2
Finland Airplay (Radiosoittolista)	27
France Airplay (SNEP)	13
Germany Airplay (BVMI)	19
Germany Dance (DDC)	11
Germany Dance (GfK)	11
Italy Airplay (EarOne)	64
Latvia Airplay (LaIPA)	5
Lithuania Airplay (TopHit)	25
Moldova Airplay (TopHit)	96
Netherlands (Dutch Top 40)	4
Netherlands (Single Top 100)	43
Netherlands Airplay (Radiomonitor)	2
Norway Airplay (IFPI Norge)	16
Paraguay Anglo Airplay (Monitor Latino)	7
Poland Airplay (OLiS)	1
Poland Streaming (OLiS)	56
Romania Airplay (TopHit)	30
Russia Airplay (TopHit)	175
Slovakia Airplay (ČNS IFPI)	4
Sweden Airplay (Radiomonitor)	5
Turkey International Airplay (Radiomonitor Türkiye)	3
Ukraine Airplay (TopHit)	2

==== Monthly charts ====
Monthly chart performance
Chart (2025–2026)	Peak position
CIS Airplay (TopHit)	35
Estonia Airplay (TopHit)	3
Latvia Airplay (TopHit)	8
Lithuania Airplay (TopHit)	30
Romania Airplay (TopHit)	32
Ukraine Airplay (TopHit)	2
