= Right Here Next to You =

Single by Jon Nørgaard

from the album This Side Up
- Released: 2002; 15 September, 2003
- Recorded: 2002
- Genre: Pop
- Length: 3:41
- Label: EMI Music

Jon Nørgaard singles chronology
"Right Here Next to You" (2002)	"This Side Up" (2003)

"Right Here Next to You" is the debut single by Danish singer Jon Nørgaard, from his debut album This Side Up. It came out on CD in 2002 and as a digital download on 15 September 2003. The song peaked at number 1 on the Danish Singles Chart.

== Track listing ==
Digital download

1. "Right Here Next to You" - 3:41
2. "Right Here Next to You" (Jon & Jules Remix) - 3:42

== Chart performance ==
Chart (2002/03)	Peak position
Denmark (Tracklisten)	1

== Release history ==
Region	Date	Format
Denmark	2002	CD
Denmark	15 September 2003	Digital download
United Kingdom	15 September 2003	Digital download
