= More Than Meets the Eye (album) =

Studio album by eliZe
- Released: June 26, 2009
- Recorded: 2007–2009
- Genre: Pop, dance, dance-pop
- Label: Spinnin' Records
- Producer: Sir Harry, Stuart Anning, Ben Robbins, Right Bank, Hi tack, Beatfreakz, Future Presidents, Bas van den Heuvel

EliZe chronology
In Control (2006)	More Than Meets the Eye (2009)

Singles from More Than Meets the Eye
- 1. "Lovesick" Released: May 26, 2008; 2. "Hot Stuff" Released: September 15, 2008; 3. "Can't You Feel It?" Released: March 2, 2009; 4. "I Can Be a Bitch" Released: August 14, 2009 (promo only)

More Than Meets the Eye is the second full-length studio album by the Dutch pop and dance singer eliZe, released on June 26, 2009, in the Netherlands.

== Track listing ==
1. "Can't You Feel It?" 3:22
2. "Get Up (Do It Now)" 3:03
3. "Lovesick" 3:15
4. "I Can Be a Bitch" 3:20
5. "Mr. Know It All" 3:21
6. "Hot Stuff" 2:56
7. "Shine Like a Superstar" 3:16
8. "Favourite Rebound" 3:46
9. "Let's Give Love a Try" 3:06
10. "So Funkable" 3:35
11. "Hook You Up" 3:44
12. "First Class Liar" 3:20
13. "Automatic" (Acoustic Version) 4:14

== Singles ==
- "Lovesick" was the first single from the album, released on May 26, 2008. It entered the Dutch Top 40 at #33 and peaked at number #31. In the Dutch Single Top 100 it reached #15. In Bulgaria the single debuted at #28 and finished on the top position (#1) in its sixth week charting.
- "Hot Stuff" was released on September 15, 2008 and became eliZe's most successful song from this album in the Netherlands, spending six weeks in the Single Top 100, reaching the #11 position. In the Dutch Top 40 it peaked at #27. In Bulgaria the single reached its peak position at #19.
- "Can't You Feel It?" was the third single released from the album, on March 2, 2009. This single was her least successful of all time, whereas it only managed to chart in the Dutch Single Top 100, peaking at #65.
- "I Can Be a Bitch" was the fourth single from the album, released on August 14, 2009, as a promotional single.
