= Jon Nørgaard =

Danish singer (born 1985)

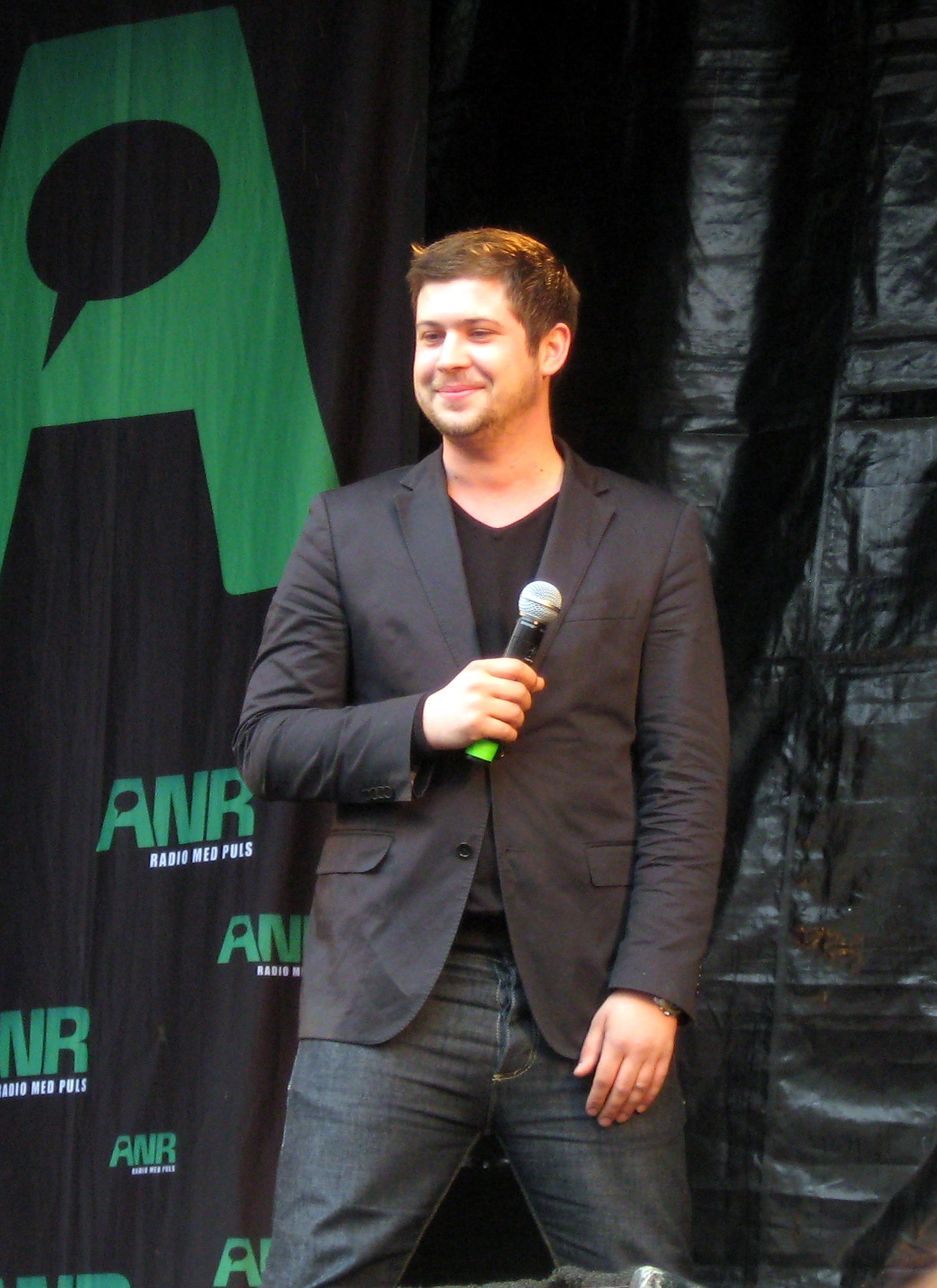
- Jon Nørgaard in Hjørring, May 2011

Background information
- Also known as: Jon; John Rock
- Born: Jon Gade Nørgaard; 9 June 1985 (age 41)
- Origin: Grenå, Denmark
- Genre: Pop
- Occupations: Singer; songwriter
- Instrument: Vocals
- Years active: 2002–present
- Labels: EMI (2003–2004); Transistor Music (2005–2006); Universal Music (2011)

Jon Gade Nørgaard (born 9 June 1985) is a Danish singer who took part in Danish TV 2's musical competition Popstars in 2002 and won the title. He is also known as Jon and took the alias John Rock while collaborating with house music duo Musikk.

== Music career ==
In 2003, Nørgaard released his debut album This Side Up written by Søren Rasted. The album sold 135,000 copies and resulted in two successful singles "Right Here Next to You" and "This Side Up". The album was also reissued in an international edition in 2003.

In 2004, under the alias John Rock, he began in 2004 in a successful collaboration with house duo Musikk with a number of No. 1 singles on the Danish Dance Chart. Among the hits was a cover version of Climie Fishers "Love Changes (Everything)". The singles went to No. 1 in 13 countries (including Mexico, Greece and Bulgaria). In 2005, he took part in Musikk's album When the Musikk Starts to Play

In 2005, Jon returned as a solo artist with the single "Popstar" which was written by Swedish singer Robyn. That same year he released his second solo studio album Today is a Good Day (To Fall in Love).

He released his solo Danish language single in May 2007, entitled "Lidt endnu" (meaning Just yet) In August 2007 landed a job as a radio host on commercial station Radio ABC in the program Mads og Jon

In 2009, his management company IDOLINC released Remady P&R's "No Superstar" throughout Scandinavia.

In 2010 Jon returned to the scene appearing in Kato's hit single "Turn the Lights Off" as one of two tracks from Kato's album Discolized. He also collaborated with Clemens in the hit "Champion" reaching the top of the Danish Singles Chart.

In March 2011 Jon released "Dine Øjne" reaching number 14 on the Danish Singles Chart. In June 2011 he released "Fester Kun Med Mig Selv" reaching number 39 on the Danish Singles Chart. He features in the single "Vi Ejer Natten" with Clemens and Hedegaard, which was released in December 2011. He released his third studio album Uden dig on 21 February 2012.

== In popular culture ==
Solo (2007)

16 April 2007 saw the premiere of the documentary Solo, directed by Kasper Torsting dealing with Jon's story after winning Popstars. The documentary gives an insight into Jon's lonely world where all odds are against him, and the music is his only resort. Kasper Torsting won two awards during the Odense International Film Festival in 2007: Audience Award and Youth Jury Prize as well as earning a Special Mention during the festival.

Remix (2008)

On 25 January 2008, yet another Danish feature film was released titled Remix directed by Martin Hagbjer. It starred Micky Skeel Hansen as a 16-year-old pop singer Ruben. Remix was inspired by the true story of Jon Gade Nørgaard.

== Discography ==
- 2003: This Side Up
- 2005: Today Is a Good Day (To Fall in Love)
- 2012: Uden dig
