= This Side Up (Jon album) =

Studio album by Jon Nørgaard
- Released: 2002; 29 September 2003 (Reissued)
- Recorded: 2002
- Genre: Pop
- Label: EMI Music

Jon Nørgaard chronology
| This Side Up (2002) | Today Is a Good Day (To Fall in Love) (2005) |

This Side Up is the first studio album by Danish singer Jon Nørgaard under the name Jon. The album was released in 2002 and reissued in an international edition in 2003. It entered the Norwegian Albums Chart at number 1. The album sold 135,000 copies and resulted in two successful singles "Right Here Next to You" and "This Side Up".

== Track listing ==
| No. | Title | Length |
|---|---|---|
| 1. | "This Side Up" | 3:49 |
| 2. | "Right Here Next to You" | 3:40 |
| 3. | "Typical Me" | 3:39 |
| 4. | "(I Will Miss You) Endlessly" | 3:53 |
| 5. | "Will and a Way" | 3:40 |
| 6. | "One Woman Man" | 4:06 |
| 7. | "I was Asleep" | 3:12 |
| 8. | "I'll Be the Party" | 3:10 |
| 9. | "Give Me a Hope" | 3:26 |
| 10. | "Sometimes A Dream Comes True" | 3:58 |

== Charts and sales ==
=== Charts ===
| Chart (2002) | Peak position |
|---|---|
| Danish Albums Chart | 1 |

=== Sales ===
| Region | Sales/Shipments |
|---|---|
| Norway | 135,000 |

== Release history ==
| Region | Date | Format |
|---|---|---|
| Denmark | 2002 | CD |
| Denmark | 29 September 2003 | Digital download |
