= This Side Up (song) =

Single by Jon Nørgaard

from the album This Side Up
- Released: 2003
- Recorded: 2002
- Genre: Pop
- Length: 3:26
- Label: EMI Music

Jon Nørgaard singles chronology
"Right Here Next to You" (2002)	"This Side Up" (2003)	"Endlessly" (2003)

"This Side Up" is a single by Danish singer Jon Nørgaard, from his debut album This Side Up. It was released in 2003. The song peaked at number 11 on the Danish Singles Chart.

== Track listing ==
Album version

1. "This Side Up" - 3:26

== Chart performance ==
Chart (2003)	Peak position
Denmark (Tracklisten)	11

== Release history ==
Region	Date	Format
Denmark	2003	CD, Digital download
