= Kato (DJ) =

Danish DJ (born 1981)

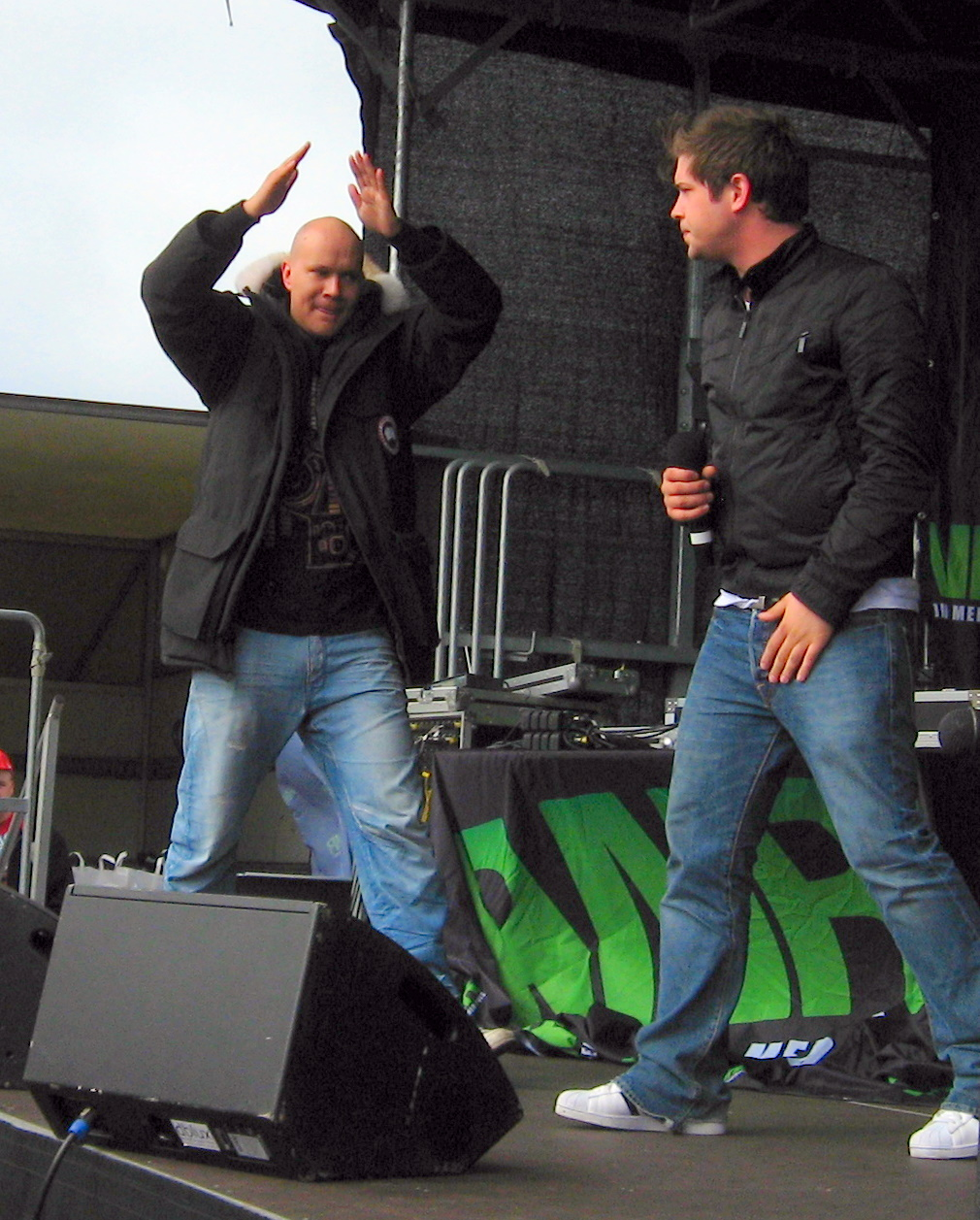
- Kato (left) and Jon Nørgaard in April 2010

Background information
- Born: Thomas Kato Vittrup; 13 September 1981 (age 45); Thisted, Denmark
- Genres: House; dance; hip-hop
- Occupations: DJ; record producer
- Years active: 2005–present

Thomas Kato Vittrup, better known as Kato (born 13 September 1981), is a Danish DJ and record producer mostly in the house genre.

== Musical career ==
Kato started DJing at nightclubs in 2005 remixing for other artists and independently since 2008, a time he also started writing and producing his own music. His breakthrough came with the commercial success of the single "Turn the Lights Off", released on 1 January 2010, receiving platinum status for selling 30,000 copies in early August 2010. The track, is a cover version of an earlier hit by DJ Jose from 2007. The track contains the vocals of Jon (full name Jon Nørgaard), a Danish Popstars contestant.

Kato released his first album, Discolized, on 1 March 2010 on the Danish label Disco:Wax that includes collaborations with Jon (Jon Nørgaard), Outlandish, Dr. Alban, Terri B, U$O and Johnson (Marc Johnson). The album reached number six on the official Danish Albums Chart.

The second single from the album, "Hey Shorty (Yeah Yeah Pt. II)", featuring rappers U$O and Johnson was released on 26 April. It was a big hit for Kato reaching number two on Tracklisten, the official Danish Singles Chart. It sold over 30,000 copies. The album's third single, "Desert Walk", a collaboration with rap group Outlandish sold 15,000 copies making it to number four in Denmark.

On 15 July 2010 it was announced that Kato had signed a contract with Universal Music in Germany including possible release of singles and albums in Germany and promotional appearances on German TV.

On 27 December Kato released the single "Sjus" featuring Ida Corr, Camille Jones and Johnson. It is a precursor to Kato's second album Discolized 2.0 due to be released in Spring 2011.

Kato won in 2007 and 2009 award for "Best Danish mainstream DJ" at the Danish DeeJay Awards.

In 2017, he released the song "Show You Love" with Sigala and Hailee Steinfeld.

In 2025, "Turn the Lights Off" found viral success after being featured in a meme with actor Jon Hamm in a club dancing scene from the American TV show Your Friends and Neighbours, with the song reaching number one on Spotify's Viral 50 - Global.

== Discography ==
=== Albums ===
| Album | Year | Peak chart position | Certifications |
| Album | Year | DAN | Certifications |
|---|---|---|---|
| Discolized | 2010 | 6 | IFPI DEN: Platinum |
| Discolized 2.0 | 2011 | 1 | IFPI DEN: Platinum |
| Behind Closed Doors | 2013 | 4 | |
| Now | 2015 | 5 | |

=== Singles ===
==== As lead artist ====
| Title | Year | Peak chart positions | | | | | | Certifications | Album |
| Title | Year | DEN | NOR | RUS | SWE | UK | US | Certifications | Album |
|---|---|---|---|---|---|---|---|---|---|
| "Hang On Sloopy" | 2001 | — | — | — | — | — | — | | Non-album singles |
| "My House" | 2007 | — | — | — | — | — | — | | Non-album singles |
| "Are You Gonna Go My Way" | 2008 | — | — | — | — | — | — | | Non-album singles |
| "Copa Cabana (Whine Your Body)" (with Darwich featuring Mission) | 2008 | — | — | — | — | — | — | | Non-album singles |
| "Yeah Yeah" | 2009 | — | — | — | — | — | — | | Non-album singles |
| "Soundscape" (featuring Michael Rune) | 2009 | — | — | — | — | — | — | | Non-album singles |
| "Turn the Lights Off" (featuring Jon) | 2010 | 4 | 19 | 7 | 6 | 33 | 82 | IFPI DEN: 2× Platinum; BPI: Silver; GLF: 2× Platinum; IFPI NOR: Gold | Discolized |
| "Hey Shorty (Yeah Yeah Pt. II)" (featuring U$O and Johnson) | 2010 | 2 | — | — | — | — | — | IFPI DEN: 3× Platinum | Discolized |
| "Desert Walk" (featuring Outlandish) | 2010 | 4 | — | — | — | — | — | IFPI DEN: Platinum | Discolized |
| "Sjus" (featuring Ida Corr, Camille Jones and Johnson) | 2010 | 1 | 2 | — | — | — | — | IFPI DEN: Platinum | Discolized 2.0 |
| "Speakers On" (with Infernal) | 2011 | 2 | 5 | — | — | — | — | IFPI DEN: Gold | Discolized 2.0 |
| "Fuck hvor er det fedt (at være hip hop'er)" (featuring Clemens) | 2011 | 3 | — | — | — | — | — | IFPI DEN: Platinum | Discolized 2.0 |
| "Never Let U Go" (featuring Snoop Dogg and Brandon Beal) | 2012 | 2 | — | — | — | — | — | IFPI DEN: 2× Platinum | Behind Closed Doors |
| "Celebrate Life" (featuring Jeremy Carr) | 2012 | — | — | — | — | — | — | | Discolized 2.0 |
| "Alive" (Kato and Electric Lady Lab) | 2012 | 4 | — | — | — | — | — | IFPI DEN: Platinum | Behind Closed Doors |
| "Danmark" (featuring Kidd) | 2013 | — | — | — | — | — | — | IFPI DEN: Gold | Non-album singles |
| "I'm in Love" (featuring Shontelle) | 2013 | — | — | — | — | — | — | IFPI DEN: Gold | Non-album singles |
| "Dimitto (Let Go)" (Kato and Safri Duo featuring Bjørnskov) | 2013 | 1 | 2 | — | — | — | — | IFPI DEN: Platinum | Non-album singles |
| "Ejer det" (Kato featuring Specktors and Djämes Braun) | 2013 | 4 | — | — | — | — | — | IFPI DEN: Platinum | Non-album singles |
| "Dumt på dig" (featuring TopGunn) | 2014 | 4 | — | — | — | — | — | IFPI DEN: 2× Platinum | Non-album singles |
| "Show You Love" (with Sigala featuring Hailee Steinfeld) | 2017 | — | — | — | — | 91 | — | IFPI DEN: Gold; BPI: Silver | Non-album singles |
| "Odyssey" (with Spyker and TOBSIK) | 2022 | — | — | — | — | — | — | | Non-album singles |

==== As featured artist ====
| Title | Year | Peak position | Certifications |
| Title | Year | DEN | Certifications |
|---|---|---|---|
| "Klapper af den" (U$O featuring Kato) | 2012 | 3 | IFPI DEN: 2× Platinum |

==== As Vittrup ====
| Title | Year | Peak position |
| Title | Year | DEN |
|---|---|---|
| "Live Forever" (Vittrup and Jeremy Carr) | 2012 | — |
| "Without You" (Vittrup) | 2014 | 12 |

== Cultural influence ==
Kato was the main inspiration for the POPDRENGENE hit "Bawler Ligesom Kato", and has been reported as being the inventor of the dab.
