= Clemens (rapper) =

Danish rapper and singer

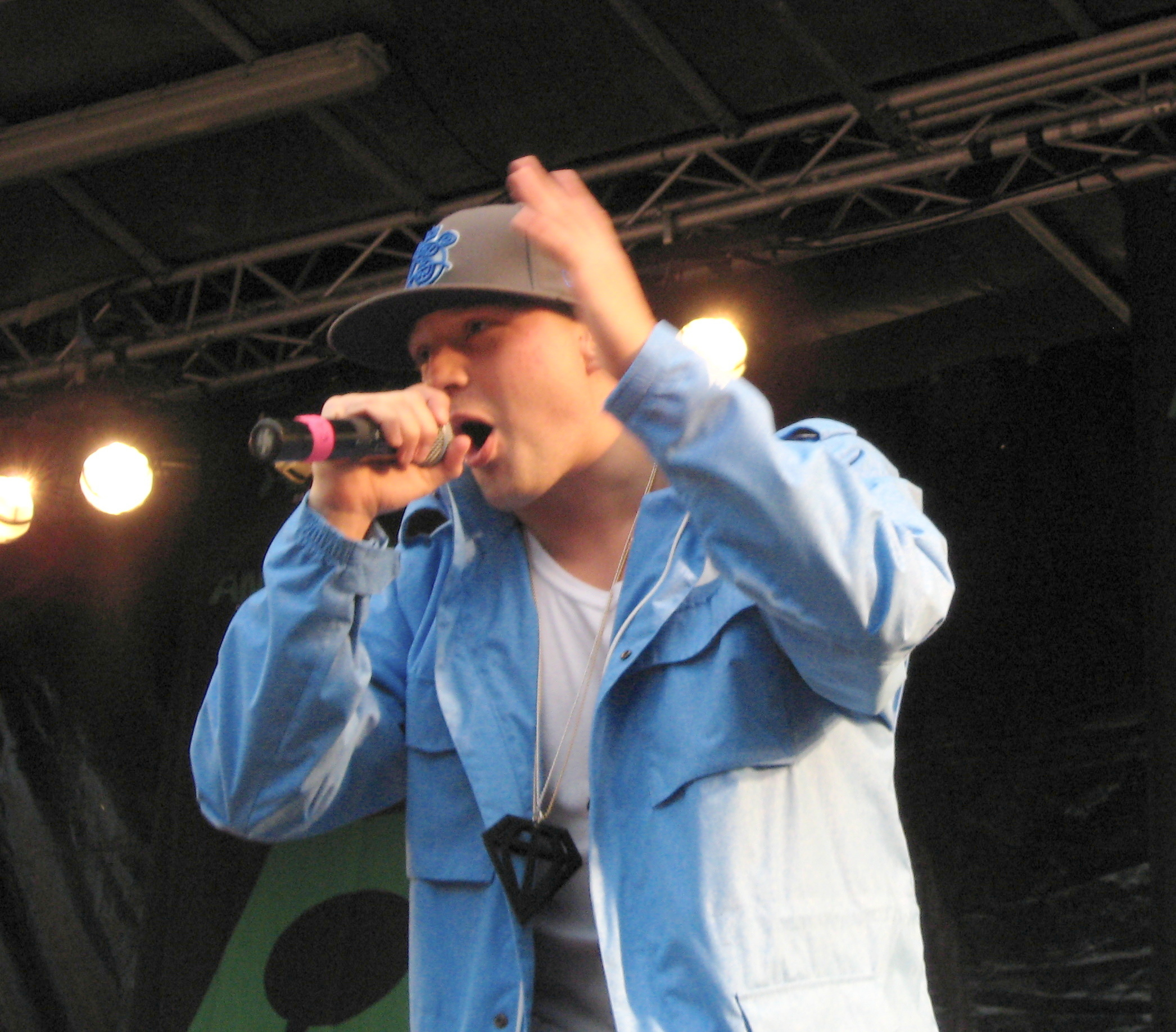
- Clemens performing in Hjørring in 2011

Background information
- Born: Clemens Legolas Telling; 8 October 1979 (age 47); Roskilde, Denmark
- Genre: Rap
- Years active: 1989 – present
- Label: Copenhagen Records
- Website: www.myspace.com/ClemensTelling

Clemens Legolas Telling better known as Clemens and MC Clemens (born 8 October 1979 in Roskilde, Denmark) is a Danish rapper, singer, music writer, actor.

Clemens started as a DJ in 1989 and was known as MC Clemens, winning many freestyle prizes in Denmark. In 1997 he had his debut album release Regnskabets Time with commercial success followed up in 1999 with Den Anden Verden. This album won him a Grammy for Best Hip Hop Album and a grant from the Arts Foundation. The same year he collaborated with Swedish rapper Petter and they both toured Denmark, Sweden, Finland and Norway. In 2001, he released Professionel Bla Bla that won him Best Hip Hop Hit by the P3 station. In 2006 he toured Japan with over 40 shows. He enjoyed a comeback in 2010 with a #1 hit "Champion" on the Tracklisten, the official Danish Singles Chart.

Clemens has also written the lyrics of many theatrical acts, including a breakdance version of Nøddeknækkeren (The Nutcracker) that was played every year from 2004 to 2008. Clemens also wrote all the lyrics for the musical Matador in 2007, an opera directed by Peter Langdal and most of the lyrics for the piece 69 in 2008 directed by Niclas Bendixen. Matador musical was released on DVD in late 2008 and Nøddeknækkeren (The Nutcracker) in late 2009.

Clemens has also appeared as a supporting character in the television series Anna Pihl.

Clemens also collaborated with rock / rap band Die Dumme Dänen on Sony BMG

== Awards ==
- Three times - 1999, 2007, 2009:Arts Foundation Prize
- 2000: Grammy of the Year - Best Hip Hop Album
- 2001: P3 Award of the Year - Best Hip Hop radio hit
- 2002: Wilhelm Hansen Foundation Prize

== Discography ==
=== Albums ===
in Die Dumme Dänen

- 2006: Spænd hjelmen

Solo charting album

Year	Album	Peak chart positions	Certifications
Year	Album	DK	Certifications
2012	Ingen kender dagen	17	

Other albums

- 1997: Regnskabets Time
- 1999: Den Anden Verden
- 2001: Professionel Bla Bla
- 2004: Dans Med Døden
- 2007: Nye tider

=== Mixtapes ===
- 2008: Det Fortabte (mixtape)

=== Singles ===
Year	Single	Peak chart positions	Album
Year	Single	DK	Album
2004	"Bang Bang"; Clemens feat. Stick	17	
2007	"La' dem hænge"	27	
2010	"Champion" (feat. Jon Nørgaard)	1	
2011	"Byen Sover"	3	
2012	"Vi ejer natten" (Jon Nørgaard, Hedegaard, Clemens)	14	
2012	"Ingen kender dagen"	12	
2012	"Tog det som en mand" (feat. Nastasia)	12	
2013	"Har du noget at sige"	21	
2013	"Tik Tik"	38	
2014	"Stjerner & hvidt lys" (Talbot, Clemens & Nøhr)	15	
2014	"Øjenåbner" (feat. Maia)	9	

=== Featured singles ===
Year	Single	Peak chart positions	Certifications	Album
Year	Single	DK	Certifications	Album
2011	"Fuck hvor er det fedt (at være hip hop'er)" (Kato feat. Clemens)	3		
